= India at the 2010 Commonwealth Games =

- CG code: IND
- CGA: Indian Olympic Association
- Website: olympic.ind.in

in Delhi, India
- Competitors: 495
- Flag bearers: Opening: Abhinav Bindra; Closing: Gagan Narang
- Medals Ranked 2nd: Gold 38 Silver 27 Bronze 36 Total 101

Commonwealth Games appearances (overview)
- 1934; 1938; 1950; 1954; 1958; 1962; 1966; 1970; 1974; 1978; 1982; 1986; 1990; 1994; 1998; 2002; 2006; 2010; 2014; 2018; 2022; 2026; 2030

India hosted the 2010 Commonwealth Games which were held in Delhi from 3 to 14 October 2010. India won 101 medals in total, including 38 Gold medals, enabling it to finish the Games at second position behind Australia. For the first time in the history of the Games India won over 100 medals in total. For the first time in the history of the Games, India won a medal in Gymnastics, where Ashish Kumar won a Silver and a Bronze. And it was after a gap of 52 years that India won a Gold in Athletics when Krishna Poonia won Gold in Women's discus throw and when Geeta Phogat won India's first ever gold medal in women's wrestling.

== Medalists ==
India won the most medals in their home games. India won 30 medals in shooting including 14 Gold medals and won 19 medals (10 are Gold medals) from wrestling out of all 21 participants.

Medals by sport
Sport	gold	silver	bronze	Total
Shooting	14	11	5	30
Wrestling	10	5	4	19
Archery	3	1	4	8
Boxing	3	0	4	7
Athletics	2	3	7	12
Weightlifting	2	2	4	8
Badminton	2	1	1	4
Table tennis	1	1	3	5
Tennis	1	1	2	4
Gymnastics	0	1	1	2
Hockey	0	1	0	1
Aquatics	0	0	1	1
Cycling	0	0	0	0
Lawn bowls	0	0	0	0
Netball	0	0	0	0
Rugby sevens	0	0	0	0
Squash	0	0	0	0
Total	38	27	36	101

Medal	Name	Sport	Event	Date
Gold	Abhinav Bindra; Gagan Narang	Shooting	Men's 10m Air rifle pairs	5 October
Gold	Anisa Sayyed; Rahi Sarnobat	Shooting	Women's 25m pistol pairs	5 October
Gold	Ravinder Singh	Wrestling	Men's Greco-Roman 60 kg	5 October
Gold	Anil Kumar	Wrestling	Men's Greco-Roman 96 kg	5 October
Gold	Sanjay Kumar	Wrestling	Men's Greco-Roman 74 kg	5 October
Gold	Yumnam Chanu	Weightlifting	Women's 58kg	6 October
Gold	Katulu Ravi Kumar	Weightlifting	Men's 69kg	6 October
Gold	Anisa Sayyed	Shooting	Women's 25m pistol individual	6 October
Gold	Omkar Singh	Shooting	Men's 50m pistol individual	6 October
Gold	Rajender Kumar	Wrestling	Men's Greco-Roman 55 kg	6 October
Gold	Gagan Narang	Shooting	Men's 10m air rifle individual	6 October
Gold	Vijay Kumar; Gurpreet Singh	Shooting	Men's 25m rapid fire pistol pairs	7 October
Gold	Omkar Singh; Gurpreet Singh	Shooting	Men's 10m air pistol pairs	7 October
Gold	Geeta Phogat	Wrestling	Women's freestyle 55 kg	7 October
Gold	Alka Tomar	Wrestling	Women's freestyle 59 kg	8 October
Gold	Anita Sheoran	Wrestling	Women's freestyle 67 kg	8 October
Gold	Deepika Kumari; Dola Banerjee; Bombayala Devi	Archery	Women's recurve team	8 October
Gold	Omkar Singh	Shooting	Men's 10m air pistol individual	8 October
Gold	Gagan Narang; Imran Hassan Khan	Shooting	Men's 50m air rifle three positions pairs	8 October
Gold	Vijay Kumar	Shooting	Men's 25m rapid fire pistol individual	8 October
Gold	Vijay Kumar; Harpreet Singh	Shooting	Men's 25m centre fire pistol pairs	9 October
Gold	Gagan Narang	Shooting	Men's 50m rifle three positions individual	9 October
Gold	Narsingh Pancham Yadav	Wrestling	Men's freestyle 74 kg	9 October
Gold	Yogeshwar Dutt	Wrestling	Men's freestyle 60 kg	9 October
Gold	Deepika Kumari	Archery	Women's recurve individual	10 October
Gold	Harpreet Singh	Shooting	Men's 25m centre fire pistol individual	10 October
Gold	Rahul Banerjee	Archery	Men's recurve individual	10 October
Gold	Sushil Kumar	Wrestling	Men's freestyle 66 kg	10 October
Gold	Somdev Devvarman	Tennis	Men's singles	10 October
Gold	Krishna Poonia	Athletics	Women's discus throw	11 October
Gold	Heena Sidhu; Annu Raj Singh	Shooting	Women's 10m air pistol pairs	12 October
Gold	Manjeet Kaur; Sini Jose; Ashwini Akkunji; Mandeep Kaur	Athletics	Women's 4 × 400 m relay	12 October
Gold	Subhajit Saha; Sharath Kamal	Table tennis	Men's doubles	13 October
Gold	Manoj Kumar	Boxing	Men's light welterweight	13 October
Gold	Suranjoy Singh	Boxing	Men's flyweight	13 October
Gold	Paramjeet Samota	Boxing	Men's super heavyweight	13 October
Gold	Ashwini Ponnappa; Jwala Gutta	Badminton	Women's doubles	14 October
Gold	Saina Nehwal	Badminton	Women's singles	14 October
Silver	Ngangbam Soniya Chanu	Weightlifting	Women's 48kg	4 October
Silver	Sukhen Dey	Weightlifting	Men's 56kg	4 October
Silver	Omkar Singh; Deepak Sharma	Shooting	Men's 50m pistol pairs	5 October
Silver	Tejaswini Sawant; Lajjakumari Gauswami	Shooting	Women's 50m rifle three positions pairs	5 October
Silver	Nishan Singh Gill	Shooting	Women's 25m pistol singles	6 October
Silver	Abhinav Bindra	Shooting	Men's 10m air rifle singles	6 October
Silver	Asher Noria; Ronjan Sodhi	Shooting	Men's double trap pairs	6 October
Silver	Manoj Kumar	Wrestling	Men's Greco-Roman 84 kg	6 October
Silver	Ritul Chatterjee; Jignas Chittibomma; Chinna Raju Srither	Archery	Men's compound team	7 October
Silver	Ronjan Sodhi	Shooting	Men's double trap singles	7 October
Silver	Nirmala Devi	Wrestling	Women's freestyle 48 kg	7 October
Silver	Ashish Kumar	Gymnastics	Men's vault	8 October
Silver	Manavjit Singh Sandhu; Mansher Singh	Shooting	Men's trap pairs	8 October
Silver	Babita Kumari	Wrestling	Women's freestyle 51 kg	8 October
Silver	Mouma Das; Poulomi Ghatak; Shamini Kumaresan	Table tennis	Women's team	8 October
Silver	Badminton Mixed Team	Badminton	Mixed team	8 October
Silver	Sania Mirza	Tennis	Women's singles	9 October
Silver	Vijay Kumar	Shooting	Men's 25m centre fire pistol individual	10 October
Silver	Anuj Kumar	Wrestling	Men's freestyle 84 kg	10 October
Silver	Joginder Kumar	Wrestling	Men's freestyle 120 kg	10 October
Silver	Vikas Shive Gowda	Athletics	Men's discus throw	10 October
Silver	Prajusha Maliakkal	Athletics	Women's long jump	10 October
Silver	Harwant Kaur	Athletics	Women's discus throw	11 October
Silver	Tejaswini Sawant	Shooting	Women's 50m rifle prone singles	12 October
Silver	Samresh Jung; Chandrasekhar Chaudhary	Shooting	Men's 25m standard pistol pairs	12 October
Silver	Heena Sidhu	Shooting	Women's 10m air pistol singles	13 October
Silver	Men's hockey team	Hockey	Men's team	14 October
Bronze	Atom Sandhya Rani Devi	Weightlifting	Women's 48kg	4 October
Bronze	Valluri Srinivasa Rao	Weightlifting	Men's 56kg	4 October
Bronze	Sunil Kumar	Wrestling	Men's Greco-Roman 66 kg	6 October
Bronze	Dharmender Dalal	Wrestling	Men's Greco-Roman 120 kg	6 October
Bronze	Prasanta Karmakar	Swimming	Men's 50m freestyle S9	6 October
Bronze	Bheigyabati Chanu; Jhano Hansdah; Gagandeep Kaur	Archery	Women's compound team	7 October
Bronze	Ashish Kumar	Gymnastics	Men's floor	7 October
Bronze	Sudhir Kumar	Weightlifting	Men's 77kg	7 October
Bronze	Suman Kundu	Wrestling	Women's freestyle 63kg	7 October
Bronze	Rahul Banerjee; Tarundeep Rai; Jayanta Talukdar	Archery	Men's recurve team	8 October
Bronze	Gurpreet Singh	Shooting	Men's 25m rapid fire pistol individual	8 October
Bronze	Kavita Raut	Athletics	Women's 10,000m	8 October
Bronze	Harminder Singh	Athletics	Men's 20 kilometres walk	9 October
Bronze	Suma Shirur; Kavita Yadav	Shooting	Women's 10 m air rifle pairs	9 October
Bronze	Sharath Kamal; Anthony Amalraj; Abhishek Ravichandran	Table tennis	Men's team	9 October
Bronze	Laishram Monika Devi	Weightlifting	Women's 75kg	9 October
Bronze	Leander Paes; Mahesh Bhupati	Tennis	Men's doubles	9 October
Bronze	Dola Banerjee	Archery	Women's recurve individual	10 October
Bronze	Jayanta Talukdar	Archery	Men's recurve individual	10 October
Bronze	Manavjit Singh Sandhu	Shooting	Men's trap Individual	10 October
Bronze	Sheetal Chandra	Wrestling	Men's freestyle 55 kg	10 October
Bronze	Sania Mirza; Rushmi Chakravarthi	Tennis	Women's doubles	10 October
Bronze	Tejaswini Sawant; Meena Kumari	Shooting	Women's 50 metre rifle prone pairs	11 October
Bronze	Seema Antil	Athletics	Women's discus throw	11 October
Bronze	Amandeep Singh	Boxing	Men's light flyweight	11 October
Bronze	Jai Bhagwan	Boxing	Men's lightweight	11 October
Bronze	Dilbagh Singh	Boxing	Men's welterweight	11 October
Bronze	Vijender Singh	Boxing	Men's welterweight	11 October
Bronze	Sathi Geetha; Hiriyur Jyothi; Srabani Nanda; P. K. Priya	Athletics	Women's 4 × 100 m relay	12 October
Bronze	Rahamatulla Molla; Suresh Sathya; Shameer Manzile; Abdul Najeeb Qureshi	Athletics	Men's 4 × 100 m relay	12 October
Bronze	Renjith Maheswary	Athletics	Men's triple jump	12 October
Bronze	Kashinath Naik	Athletics	Men's javelin throw	12 October
Bronze	Samresh Jung	Shooting	Men's 25m standard pistol singles	13 October
Bronze	Parupalli Kashyap	Badminton	Men's singles	13 October
Bronze	Mouma Das; Poulomi Ghatak	Table tennis	Women's doubles	14 October
Bronze	Sharath Kamal	Table tennis	Men's singles	14 October

== Archery ==
India sent 12 archers to the 2010 commonwealth games Delhi.

=== Men ===
Archer(s)	Event	Qualification		Round of 64	Round of 32	Round of 16	Quarterfinal	Semifinal	Final / BM	
Archer(s)	Event	Score	Seed	Opposition Score	Opposition Score	Opposition Score	Opposition Score	Opposition Score	Opposition Score	Rank
Rahul Banerjee	Recurve individual	679	1	—N/a	Coward (JER); W 4-0	Sojeb (BAN); W 4-0	Masonwells (AUS); W 6-5	Gray (AUS); W 6-5	Lyon (CAN); W 6-5	1st place, gold medalist(s)
Tarundeep Rai	Recurve individual	647	13	—N/a	Watson (NIR); W 4-0	Cheng (MAS); L 0-4	did not advance			
Jayanta Talukdar	Recurve individual	676	2	—N/a	Loizou (CYP); W 4-0	Christodoulou (CYP); W 5-1	Terry (ENG); W 6-2	Lyon (CAN); L 0=6	Gray (AUS); W 6-4	3rd place, bronze medalist(s)
Ritul Chatterjee	Compound individual	685	21	Cornet (MRI); L	did not advance					
Jignas Chittibomma	Compound individual	693	17	Uddin (BAN); W	Whittingham (SCO); W	Cilliers (RSA); L	did not advance			
Chinna Srither	Compound individual	691	18	Vasileiou (CYP); W	Waddick (NZL); L	did not advance				
Jayanta Talukdar; Rahul Banerjee; Tarundeep Rai	Team recurve	—N/a	6	—N/a			Sri Lanka; W 213 - 205	Australia; L 211 - 216	England; W 221:218	3rd place, bronze medalist(s)
Chinna Srither; C H Jignas; Ritul Chatterjee	Team compound	—N/a	6	—N/a		Trinidad and Tobago; W 224:219	New Zealand; W 226:225	South Africa; W 226:224	England; L 229:231	2nd place, silver medalist(s)

=== Women ===
Athlete	Event	Ranking Round		Round of 32	Round of 16	Quarterfinals	Semifinals	Final / BM	
Athlete	Event	Score	Seed	Opposition Score	Opposition Score	Opposition Score	Opposition Score	Opposition Score	Rank
Dola Banerjee	Recurve individual	658	2	—N/a	Sui (MAS); W 4-2	Oliver (ENG); W 6-2	Williamson (ENG); L 2-6	Subramanian (MAS); W 6-2	3rd place, bronze medalist(s)
Laishram Bombayala Devi	Recurve individual	624	9	—N/a	Feeney (AUS); L 4-2	did not advance			
Deepika Kumari	Recurve individual	662	1	—N/a	Tan (SIN); W 4-0	Feeney (AUS); W 6-0	Subramanian (MAS); W 7-1	Williamson (ENG); W 6-0	1st place, gold medalist(s)
Gagandeep Kaur	Compound individual	675	15	Coetzee (RSA); W	Hunt (ENG); L	did not advance			
Jhano Hansdah	Compound individual	674	17	Darby (AUS); L	did not advance				
Bhegiyabati Chanu	Compound individual	667	21	Croskery (NZL); L	did not advance				
Dola Banerjee; Deepika Kumari; Bombayala Devi Laishram	Team recurve	—N/a	1	—N/a			Malaysia; W 213-185	England; W 207-206	1st place, gold medalist(s)
Gagandeep Kaur; Jhano Hansdah; Bhegiyabati Chanu	Team compound	—N/a	5	—N/a		Australia; W 227-220	Canada; L 224-217	Malaysia; W 223-219	3rd place, bronze medalist(s)

== Athletics ==
116 Indian athletes took part in track and field and won twelve medals.

=== Men ===
==== Road and Track events ====
Athlete	Event	Heat		Quarterfinal		Semifinal		Final	
Athlete	Event	Result	Rank	Result	Rank	Result	Rank	Result	Rank
Abdul Qureshi	100m	10.40	1Q	10.30 NR	4q	10.40	7	Did not advance	
Krishnakumar Rane	100m	10.61	5q	10.55	7	Did not advance to next round			
Nagaraj Gobbargumpi	100m	10.69	6q	10.65	7	Did not advance to next round			
Abdul Qureshi	200m	DSQ		Did not advance to next round					
Dharambir	200m	21.48	3Q	21.20 PB	6	Did not advance to next round			
Hussain Inaas	200m	23.06	6	Did not advance to next round					
Harpreet Singh	400m	48.29	5	Did not advance to next round					
Manjit	800m	1:51.22	5q	—N/a		1:50.88	7	Did not advance	
Francis Pathi	800m	1:50.12	2Q	—N/a		DNF		Did not advance	
Hamza Chatholi	1500m	3:44.72 SB	9	Did not advance to next round					
Sandeep	1500m	3:44.55	6	Did not advance to next round					
Sandip Kumar	5000m	—N/a						14:22.59 PB	16
Sunil Kumar	5000m	—N/a						14:18.99	14
Sunil Kumar	10,000m	—N/a						DNF	
Suresh Kumar	10,000m	—N/a						29:49.74	11
Muthuswamy Pandi	110m hurdles	14.97	5	Did not advance to next round					
Siddhanth Thingalaya	110m hurdles	14.06	5	Did not advance to next round					
Joseph Ganapathilacka	400m hurdles	50.55	4	Did not advance to next round					
Kuldev Singh	400m hurdles	51.59	4	Did not advance to next round					
Elam Singh	3000m steeplechase	—N/a						8:44.35	9
Ramachandran Ramadas	3000m steeplechase	—N/a						8:57.63	10
Rahamatulla Molla; Suresh Sathya; Shameer Naseema; Abdul Qureshi	4 x 100m relay	39.00 NR	1Q	—N/a				38.89 NR	3rd place, bronze medalist(s)
Premananad Jayakumar; Bibin Mathew; Kunhu Puthanpurakkal; Mortaja Shake	4 x 400m relay	3:06.30	3q	—N/a				3:07.60	7
Bining Lyngkhoi	Marathon	—N/a						2:23:01	9
Ram Singh Yadav	Marathon	—N/a						2:21:24	8
Baljinder Singh	20km walk	—N/a						1:29:18	9
Harminder Singh	20km walk	—N/a						1:23:28 PB	3rd place, bronze medalist(s)

==== Field events ====
Athlete	Event	Qualification		Final	
Athlete	Event	Distance	Position	Distance	Position
Nikhil Chittarasu	High jump	2.16	14 Q	2.15	13
Hari Sankar Roy	High jump	2.16	=6 Q	2.15	11
Harikrishnan	Long jump	7.40	15	did not advance	
Ankit Sharma	Long jump	7.56	8 q	7.56	8
Mahan Singh	Long jump	7.49	10	7.47	9
Renjith Maheswary	Triple jump	—N/a		17.07	3rd place, bronze medalist(s)
Amarjeet Singh	Triple jump	—N/a		16.00	9
Om Prakash Karhana	Shot put	18.48	5 q	19.51	5
Sourabh Vij	Shot put	17.16	7 q	18.60	6
Vikas Gowda	Discus throw	60.83	2 Q	63.69	2nd place, silver medalist(s)
Anil Kumar	Discus throw	47.86	13	did not advance	
Chandrodaya Singh	Hammer throw	—N/a		64.20	9
Kamalpreet Singh	Hammer throw	—N/a		61.00	11
Kashinath Naik	Javelin throw	—N/a		74.29	3rd place, bronze medalist(s)
Rajender Singh	Javelin throw	—N/a		73.72	4
Samarjeet Singh	Javelin throw	—N/a		68.84	8
Upadhyay Gajanan	Pole vault	—N/a		4.80	9
Vadivelu Natarajan	Pole vault	—N/a		NM	

=== Women's track ===
Athlete	Event	Heat		Semifinal		Final	
Athlete	Event	Result	Rank	Result	Rank	Result	Rank
Sathi Geetha	100m	11.80	5 q	11.82	7	did not advance	
Hiriyur Jyothi	100m	11.81	4 Q	11.86	6	did not advance	
Sathi Geetha	200m	23.99	3 Q	DSQ		did not advance	
Hiriyur Jyothi	200m	24.25	3 Q	24.52	6	did not advance	
Mandeep Kaur	400m	52.48	3 Q	52.60	4 q	52.37	5
Manjeet Kaur	400m	52.75	1 Q	53.04	3	did not advance	
Tintu Luka	800m	2:02.73	1 Q	—N/a		2:01.25	6
Sinimole Paulose	800m	2:03.44	4	did not advance			
Sushma Devi	1500m	4:22.05	7	did not advance			
Jhuma Khatun	1500m	4:12.30	7 q	—N/a		4:14.95	12
Jaisha Orchatteri	1500m	4:13.15	9	did not advance			
Lalita Babar	5000m	—N/a				DNS	
Jhuma Khatun	5000m	—N/a				DNS	
Lalita Babar	10,000m	—N/a				35:03.49	8
Kavita Raut	10,000m	—N/a				33:05.28	3rd place, bronze medalist(s)
Preeja Sreedharan	10,000m	—N/a				33:43.91	7
Anuradha Biswal	100m hurdles	14.96	6	did not advance			
Gayathri Govindaraj	100m hurdles	13.83	3 Q	—N/a		13.95	7
Ashwini Akkunji	400m hurdles	59.49	5	did not advance			
Jauna Murmu	400m hurdles	59.86	5	did not advance			
O. P. Jaisha	3000m steeplechase	—N/a				10:20.83	8
Priyanka Singh	3000m steeplechase	—N/a				10:26.48	9
Sudha Singh	3000m steeplechase	—N/a				9:57.63 PB	5
Sathi Geetha; Hiriyur Jyothi; Srabani Nanda; P. K. Priya	4 x 100m relay	—N/a				45.25	3rd place, bronze medalist(s)
Ashwini Akkunji; Sini Jose; Jauna Murmu; Chitra Soman	4 x 400m relay	3:32.52	1 Q	—N/a		3:27.77	1st place, gold medalist(s)
Preethi Lakshmi	Marathon	—N/a				3:08.14	11
Sandhya Kakkuziyil Jolly	20km walk	—N/a				1:51:44	7

==== Field events ====
Athlete	Event	Qualification		Final	
Athlete	Event	Distance	Position	Distance	Position
Kavya Muthanna	High jump	—N/a		1.68	13
Sahana Kumari	High jump	—N/a		1.83 SB	4
Mayookha Johny	Long jump	6.27	8q	6.30	6
Prajusha Maliakkal	Long jump	6.31q	6	6.47	2nd place, silver medalist(s)
Reshmi Bose	Long jump	6.12	10q	6.26	7
Gayathri Govindaraj	Triple jump	—N/a		12.96	10
Mayookha Johny	Triple jump	—N/a		13.58	7
Prajusha Maliakkal	Triple jump	—N/a		13.72 NR	4
Manpreet Kaur	Shot put	—N/a		14.50	9
Patwant Kaur	Shot put	—N/a		12.63	11
Harwant Kaur	Discus throw	—N/a		60.16	2nd place, silver medalist(s)
Krishna Poonia	Discus throw	—N/a		61.51	1st place, gold medalist(s)
Seema Antil	Discus throw	—N/a		58.46	3rd place, bronze medalist(s)
Hardeep Kaur	Hammer throw	59.73	11q	59.96	10
Manju Bala	Hammer throw	54.84	15	Did not advance	
Saraswathi Sundaram	Javelin throw	—N/a		51.51 SB	8
Suman Devi	Javelin throw	—N/a		51.19 SB	9

=== Paralympic athletics ===
Athlete	Event	Heats		Semifinals		Final	
Athlete	Event	Result	Rank	Result	Rank	Result	Rank
Markanda Reddy	Men's 100m T46	11.72	5 q	11.71	6	did not advance	
Jagseer Singh	Men's 100m T46	12.01	5	did not advance			
Sandeep Singh	Men's 100m T46	11.85	4 q	11.81	6	did not advance	
Amit Kumar	Men's shot put F32/34/52	—N/a				4.39	8
Manjualam Mahadevaiah	Women's shot put F32-34/52/53	—N/a				3.42	6
Deepa Malik	Women's shot put F32-34/52/53	—N/a				3.63	7

== Badminton ==
=== Men ===
Athlete	Event	Round of 64	Round of 32	Round of 16	Quarterfinal	Semifinal	Final / BM	
Athlete	Event	Opposition Score	Opposition Score	Opposition Score	Opposition Score	Opposition Score	Opposition Score	Rank
Chetan Anand	Men's singles	Bye	Fagbemi (NGR); W 2-0	van Hooijdonk (WAL); W 2-0	Baxter (ENG); W 2-0	Lee (MAS); L 0-2	Parupalli (IND); L 0-2	4
Kashyap Parupalli	Men's singles	Brownlee (FAI); W 2-0	Pyne (JAM); W 2-0	Merilees (SCO); W 2-0	Hashim (MAS); W 2-1	Ouseph (ENG); L 1-2	Anand (IND); W 2-0	3rd place, bronze medalist(s)
Rupesh Kumar; Sanava Thomas	Men's doubles	—N/a	Abah / Edicha (NGR); W 2-0	Henry / Palmer (JAM); W 2-0	Triyachart / Wong (SIN); L 0-2	did not advance		

=== Women ===
Athlete	Event	Round of 64	Round of 32	Round of 16	Quarterfinal	Semifinal	Final / BM	
Athlete	Event	Opposition Score	Opposition Score	Opposition Score	Opposition Score	Opposition Score	Opposition Score	Rank
Aditi Mutatkar	Women's singles	Bye	Dahanayake (SRI); W 2-0	Gilmour (SCO); W 2-0	Wong (MAS); L 0-2	did not advance		
Saina Nehwal	Women's singles	Bye	Thomas (WAL); W 2-0	Black (NIR); W 2-0	Rice (CAN); W 2-0	Egelstaff (SCO); W 2-0	Wong (MAS); W 2-1	1st place, gold medalist(s)
Aparna Balan; Aditi Mutatkar	Women's doubles	—N/a	Luxton / Minto (FAI); W 2-0	Choo / Veeran (AUS); L 0-2	did not advance			
Jwala Gutta; Ashwini Ponnappa	Women's doubles	Bye		Chin / Woon (MAS); W 2-1	Agathangelou / Olver (ENG); W 2-0	Tian / Wilson (AUS); W 2-1	Yao / Sari (SIN); W 2-0	1st place, gold medalist(s)

=== Mixed ===
Athlete	Event	Round of 32	Round of 16	Quarterfinal	Semifinal	Final / BM	
Athlete	Event	Opposition Score	Opposition Score	Opposition Score	Opposition Score	Opposition Score	Rank
Valiyaveetil Diju; Jwala Gutta	Mixed Doubles	Henry; Karjohn (JAM); W 2-0	Ponnappa; Kumar (IND); W 2-1	Koo; Chin (MAS); L 0-2	did not advance		
Ashwini Ponnappa; Rupesh Kumar	Mixed Doubles	Malcouzane; Camille (SEY); W 2-0	Diju; Gutta (IND); L 1-2	did not advance			
Aparna Balan; Sanave Thomas	Mixed Doubles	Tang; Warfe (AUS); W 2-0	Braimah; Fagbemi (NGR); W 2-0	White; Adcock (ENG); L 0-2	did not advance		
Chetan Anand; Parupalli Kashyap; Saina Nehwal; Aditi Mutatkar; Jwala Gutta; Ashwini Ponnappa; Aparna Balan; Rupesh Kumar; Valiyaveetil Diju; Sanave Thomas	Mixed team	—N/a		Canada; W 3–0	England; W 3–0	Malaysia; L 1–3	2nd place, silver medalist(s)

== Boxing ==
India won seven medals including three gold medals.

Men

Athlete	Event	Round of 32	Round of 16	Quarterfinal	Semifinal	Final	
Athlete	Event	Opposition Result	Opposition Result	Opposition Result	Opposition Result	Opposition Result	Rank
Amandeep Singh	Light Flyweight –49 kg	Warui (KEN); W 6-2	Matusi (RWA); W 4-0	Fuad (MAS); W 7-1	Barnes (NIR); L 0-5	Did not advance	3rd place, bronze medalist(s)
Suranjoy Mayengbam	Flyweight –52 kg	—N/a	Plange (GHA); W 15-4	Subrie (MAS); W 9-2	Iqbal (PAK); W 9-3	Njangiru (KEN); W WO	1st place, gold medalist(s)
Akhil Kumar	Bantamweight –56 kg	Khan (PAK); W 7–0	Weaver (ENG); W 11–6	Julie (MRI); L 5–7	Did not advance to next round		
Jai Bhagwan	Lightweight –60 kg	Caleb (NRU); W 11–1	Mafuru (TAN); W 11–2	Songbamu (NGR); W 10–0	Stalker (ENG); L 5–10	Did not advance	3rd place, bronze medalist(s)
Manoj Kumar	Light Welterweight –64 kg	Lassayo (SLE); W RSC	Gaasite (BOT); W 5–2	Mathenge (KEN); W 6-2	Knowles (BAH); W 3–1	Saunders (ENG); W 11–2	1st place, gold medalist(s)
Dilbag Singh	Welterweight –69 kg	Latu (TON); W 22–4	Prince (TRI); W 11–3	Mothiba (BOT); W 11–3	Gallagher (NIR); L 4–5	Did not advance	3rd place, bronze medalist(s)
Vijender Singh	Middleweight –75 kg	—N/a	Ombaka (KEN); W RSC	Nashivela (NAM); W KO	Ogogo (ENG); L 3–4	Did not advance	3rd place, bronze medalist(s)
Dinesh Kumar	Light Heavyweight –81 kg	—N/a	Mbwakongo (ENG); L 8–9	Did not advance to next round			
Manpreet Singh	Heavyweight –91 kg	—N/a	Mhando (TAN); W 15–3	Ward (NIR); L 10-11	Did not advance to next round		
Paramjit Samota	Super Heavyweight +91 kg	—N/a	Reid (JAM); W RSC	Mukhin (AUS); W 7–4	Fa (TON); W 6–2	Haqq (TRI); W 5–1	1st place, gold medalist(s)

== Diving ==
India selected a team to the Games:

=== Men ===
Athlete	Event	Preliminaries		Final	
Athlete	Event	Points	Rank	Points	Rank
Puskar Chingshubam	10m platform	307.30	10	292.00	10
Manesh Mohan	Men's 3m springboard	255.70	13	did not advance	
Rabikumar Senjam	Men's 1m springboard	251.70	13	did not advance	
Hari Thimmarayappa	Men's 1m springboard	274.75	12 Q	251.25	12
Hari Thimmarayappa	Men's 3m springboard	260.70	12	261.20	12
Himanshu Tiwari	Men's 10m platform	227.40	11	248.60	11

=== Women ===
Athlete	Event	Preliminaries		Final	
Athlete	Event	Points	Rank	Points	Rank
Karishma Mohite	Women's 1m springboard	137.10	13	did not advance	
Karishma Mohite	Women's 3m springboard	190.10	13	175.35	12
Deepti Panwar	Women's 10m platform	171.60	13	did not advance	
Hrutika Shriram	Women's 1m springboard	152.55	12 Q	166.95	12
Hrutika Shriram	Women's 3m springboard	190.10	12 Q	194.60	11
Hrutika Shriram	Women's 10m platform	176.75	12 Q	220.85	12

== Gymnastics ==
India selected gymnasts to the Games.

=== Men's artistic ===
Team

Athlete	Event	Final							
Athlete	Event	Apparatus						Total	Rank
Athlete	Event	F	PH	R	V	PB	HB	Total	Rank
Rohit Jaiswal; Ashish Kumar; Partha Mondal; Rakesh Patra	Team	39.750	37.850	41.600	44.450	39.550	37.200	240.400	6

Individual

Athlete	Event	Apparatus						Total	Rank
Athlete	Event	F	PH	R	V	PB	HB	Total	Rank
Ashish Kumar	All-around	14.850	12.500	13.700	16.200	12.700	11.850	81.800	8
Ashish Kumar	Floor	14.475	—N/a					14.475	3rd place, bronze medalist(s)
Ashish Kumar	Vault	—N/a			15.312	—N/a		15.312	2nd place, silver medalist(s)

=== Women ===
Team

Athlete	Event	Final					
Athlete	Event	Apparatus				Total	Rank
Athlete	Event	V	UB	BB	F	Total	Rank
Priti Das; Roma Dilip Joglekar; Dipa Karmakar; Meenakshi Meenakshi; Debjani Samanta	Team	39.150	24.650	29.150	31.350	124.300	8

Individual

Athlete	Event	Apparatus				Total	Rank
Athlete	Event	V	UB	BB	F	Total	Rank
Dipa Karmakar	Vault	12.687	—N/a			12.687	7

=== Rhythmic ===
Athlete	Event	Final					
Athlete	Event	Hoop	Ball	Clubs	Ribbon	Total	Rank
Pooja Shriniwas Surve	Individual all-around	16.200	17.600	16.925	17.650	68.375	16

== Field Hockey ==
=== Men ===
- Sandeep Singh
- Arjun Halappa
- Prabhjot Singh
- Sardara Singh
- Gurwinder Singh Chandi
- Deepak Thakur
- Sarwanjit Singh
- Gurbaj Singh
- Tushar Khandker
- Rajpal Singh (captain)
- Sreejesh Ravindran
- Shivendra Singh
- Bharat Chikara
- Dhananjay Mahadik
- Vikram Pillay
- Danish Mujtaba
- Coach:- Jose Brasa

India has been drawn into Group A with Australia, Pakistan, Malaysia and Scotland.

==== Pool A ====
Team	Pts	Pld	W	l	L	GF	GA	GD
Australia	12	4	4	0	0	22	2	+20
India	9	4	3	0	1	16	11	+5
Pakistan	6	4	2	0	2	11	9	+2
Malaysia	3	4	1	0	3	5	14	−11
Scotland	0	4	0	0	4	0	18	−18

5 October 2010
19:00

India	3–2	Malaysia
Mahadik 27'; Singh 35+'; Bharat 66'	Report	Hanafi 15'; Misron 34'

Umpires:
Gareth Greenfield (NZL)
Martin Madden (SCO)

7 October 2010
16:00

India	2–5	Australia
Singh 12'; Sandeep 70+'	Report	Abbott 2'; Mitton 6'; Ockenden 48' de Young 54'; Turner 58'

Umpires:
Nathan Stagno (GIB)
Andrew Kennedy (ENG)

9 October 2010
19:00

Scotland	0–4	India
	Report	Sarvanjit Singh 8'; Dharamvir Singh 13' 61'; Dhananjay Mahadik 51'

Umpires:
Albert Marcano (TRI)
Tim Pullman (AUS)

10 October 2010
19:00

Pakistan	4–7	India
Imran 27'; Rizwan 29'; Irfan 58'; Shakeel 68'	Report	Sandeep 3' 11'; Shivendra 19' 59'; Saravanjit 20'; Danish 41'; Dharamvir 45'

Umpires:
Tim Pullman (AUS)
Nathan Stagno (GIB)

=== First to fourth place classification ===
Semi-finals
12 October 2010
Australia	6
New Zealand	2
12 October 2010
England	3 (4)
India	3 (5)

Final
14 October 2010
Australia	8
India	0

==== Semi-finals ====
12 October 2010
17:30

England	3–3 (a.e.t.)	India
Jackson 35+' 41'; S. Mantell 45'	Report	Saravanjit 20' 60'; Pillay 56'
Penalties
Smith (penalty shoot-out scored); R. Mantell (penalty shoot-out scored); Kirkham (penalty shoot-out missed); Jackson (penalty shoot-out scored); S. Mantell (penalty shoot-out scored)	4–5	(penalty shoot-out scored) Saravanjit; (penalty shoot-out scored) Pillay; (penalty shoot-out scored) Sandeep; (penalty shoot-out scored) Halappa; (penalty shoot-out scored) Shivendra

Umpires:
Tim Pullman (AUS)
Nathan Stagno (GIB)

==== Gold medal match ====
14 October 2010
11:30

Australia	8–0	India
Wilson 19' 28'; Ciriello 21'; Doerner 34' 52'; Orchard 60'; Dwyer 66'; Turner 70'	Report

Umpires:
Peter Wright (RSA)
Nathan Stagno (GIB)

=== Women ===
- Binita Toppo
- Subhadra Pradhan
- Joydeep Kaur
- Asunta Lakra
- Kirandeep Kaur
- Mukta Prava Barla
- Deepika Thakur
- Ritu Rani
- Surinder Kaur (captain)
- Saba Anjum
- Rani Rampal
- Jasjeet Kaur Handa
- Thokcham Chanchan Devi
- Poonam Rani
- Dipika Murty
- Rajani Etimarpu

==== Pool A ====
Team	Pts	Pld	W	D	L	GF	GA	GD
Australia	10	4	3	1	0	19	4	+15
South Africa	7	4	2	1	1	16	5	+11
India	7	4	2	1	1	12	4	+8
Scotland	4	4	1	1	2	10	9	+1
Trinidad and Tobago	0	4	0	0	4	1	36	−35

4 October 2010
18:00

India	1–1	Scotland
Handa 45'	Report	Cram 3'

Umpires:
Michelle Joubert (RSA)
Chieko Soma (JPN)

6 October 2010
13:30

Australia	2–1	India
Liddelow 11'; Rivers 59'	Report	Rampal 69'

Umpires:
Kelly Hudson (NZL)
Frances Block (ENG)

8 October 2010
10:30

India	7–0	Trinidad and Tobago
S. Kaur 8' 30' 37' 54'; Rani 14'; Rampal 34'; Handa 68'	Report

Umpires:
Gillian Batey (CAN)
Nor Piza Hassan (MAS)

9 October 2010
21:00

South Africa	1–3	India
Coetzee 45'	Report	Thakur 11' 21'; S. Kaur 35'

Umpires:
Elena Eskina (RUS)
Irene Presenqui (ARG)

== Lawn Bowls ==
Men

Competitors	Event	Rank
Mohammed Raja	Men's Singles	9
Mahip Tirkey; Sunil Bahadur	Men's Pairs	7
Dinesh Kumar; Krishna Xalxo; Prince Kumar Mahato	Men's Triples	9

Women

Competitors	Event	Rank
Farzana Khan	Women's Singles	7
Arzoo Rani; Manu Pal	Women's Pairs	8
Tania Choudhry; Pinki Kaushik; Rupa Rani Tirkey	Women's Triples	4

== Netball ==
22 members squad for 2010 Commonwealth Games has been declared.

- Megha Chaudhary
- Prachi Tehlan (captain)
- Ramandeep Kaur
- Neha Bajaj
- Priya Dahiya
- Mainisha Rathore
- Punam Kumari
- Santosh Jakhar
- Shireen Limaye
- Kavitha Kavitha
- Indu Panwar
- Bobby Bobby
- Padma Padma
- Neha Lakhera
- Neha Kansal
- Amanjit Kaur
- Rupinder Kaur
- Deepali Sharma
- Preeti Banchor
- Kiranjit Kaur
- Harminder Kaur
- Leela H.S.

India is drawn in Pool A

=== Pool A ===
Pos	Team	Pld	W	D	L	GF	GA	G%	Pts
1	Australia	5	5	0	0	385	172	223.8	10
2	Jamaica	5	4	0	1	362	217	166.8	8
3	Malawi	5	3	0	2	293	262	111.8	6
4	Trinidad and Tobago	5	2	0	3	249	275	90.5	4
5	Samoa	5	1	0	4	246	291	84.5	2
6	India	5	0	0	5	123	441	27.9	0

- Goal percentage (G%) = 100 × GF/GA. Accurate to one decimal place.
- Teams that are highlighted after the completion of pool matches advance to the medal playoffs.

5 October; 17:00 (IST)	Report	Australia	113–18	India	Thyagaraj Sports Complex; Umpires: Jonathan Bredin, Dalton Hinds; Reserve umpire: Judith Groves
5 October; 17:00 (IST)	Report	Cox 27/28 (96%); McMahon 22/23 (96%); Medhurst 25/26 (96%); Pratley 39/42 (93%)		H. Kaur 6/10 (60%); K. Kaur 7/8 (88%); Tehlan 5/5 (100%)	Thyagaraj Sports Complex; Umpires: Jonathan Bredin, Dalton Hinds; Reserve umpire: Judith Groves

6 October; 11:30 (IST)	Report	Malawi	82–26	India	Thyagaraj Sports Complex; Umpires: Gary Burgess, Bobbi Brown; Reserve umpire: Dalton Hinds
6 October; 11:30 (IST)	Report	Kumwenda 47/53 (89%); Magombo 12/15 (80%); Simtowe 6/7 (86%); Waya 17/21 (81%)		Bajaj 4/4 (100%); H. Kaur 5/9 (56%); K. Kaur 17/19 (89%)	Thyagaraj Sports Complex; Umpires: Gary Burgess, Bobbi Brown; Reserve umpire: Dalton Hinds

7 October; 11:30 (IST)	Trinidad and Tobago	77–26	India	Thyagaraj Sports Complex; Umpires: Anne Abraitis, Sylvester Campbell; Reserve umpire: Bobbi Brown
7 October; 11:30 (IST)	Barker 46/47 (98%); Cooper 16/18 (89%); Wallace 15/18 (83%)		Bajaj 10/13 (77%); H. Kaur 6/8 (75%); K. Kaur 4/8 (50%); Tehlan 6/8 (75%)	Thyagaraj Sports Complex; Umpires: Anne Abraitis, Sylvester Campbell; Reserve umpire: Bobbi Brown

9 October; 17:00 (IST)	India	26–69	Samoa	Thyagaraj Sports Complex; Umpires: Sharon Kelly, Rachael Ayre; Reserve umpire: Judith Groves
9 October; 17:00 (IST)	Chaudhary 3/6 (50%); H. Kaur 3/7 (43%); K. Kaur 14/19 (74%); Tehlan 6/9 (67%)		Chang 14/16 (88%); Faasavalu 9/12 (75%); Fuimaono 25/29 (86%); Langi 21/24 (88%)	Thyagaraj Sports Complex; Umpires: Sharon Kelly, Rachael Ayre; Reserve umpire: Judith Groves

10 October; 11:00 (IST)	Jamaica	100–27	India	Thyagaraj Sports Complex; Umpires: Amanda Nottingham, Paula Ferguson; Reserve umpire: Rachael Ayre
10 October; 11:00 (IST)	R. Aiken 40/42 (95%); Forbes 13/14 (93%); Fowler 38/41 (93%); Griffiths 9/12 (75%)		Chaudhary 0/1 (0%); H. Kaur 8/12 (67%); Tehlan 19/23 (83%)	Thyagaraj Sports Complex; Umpires: Amanda Nottingham, Paula Ferguson; Reserve umpire: Rachael Ayre

== Rugby Sevens ==
=== Men ===
- Nasser Hussain
- Hrishikesh Pendse
- Rohaan Sethna
- Kayrus Unwala
- Pritom Roy
- Gautam Dagar
- Deepak Dagar
- Kamaldeep Dagar
- Amit Lochab
- Jagga Singh
- Sailen Tudu
- Thimmaiah Mandanda
- Dinesh Kumar Ravi Kumar
- Bikash Jena
- Surinder Singh
- Sukhdeep Singh
- Rohit Sivach
- Dalwinder Singh
- Sujai Lama
- Puneet Krishnamoorthy
- Roshan Lobo

India is in Pool B

=== Group B ===
Team	Pld	W	D	L	PF	PA	PD	Pts
South Africa	3	3	0	0	109	5	+104	9
Wales	3	2	0	1	99	35	+64	7
Tonga	3	1	0	2	45	72	−27	5
India	3	0	0	3	12	153	−141	3

11 October 2010
9:22

Wales	56–7	India

Delhi University, New Delhi

11 October 2010
12:06

South Africa	59–0	India

Delhi University, New Delhi

11 October 2010
15:32

Tonga	38–5	India

Delhi University, New Delhi

== Shooting ==
India topped the medal table in shooting

=== Men ===
Athlete	Event	Final	
Athlete	Event	Total	Rank
Gurpreet Singh	Men's 10m air pistol	671.7	5
Omkar Singh	Men's 10m air pistol	681.8 =GR	1st place, gold medalist(s)
Abhinav Bindra	Men's 10m air rifle	698.0	2nd place, silver medalist(s)
Gagan Narang	Men's 10m air rifle	703.6 =GR	1st place, gold medalist(s)
Vijay Kumar	Men's 25m centre fire pistol	574	2nd place, silver medalist(s)
Harpreet Singh	Men's 25m centre fire pistol	580	1st place, gold medalist(s)
Vijay Kumar	Men's 25m rapid fire pistol	787.5 =GR	1st place, gold medalist(s)
Gurpreet Singh	Men's 25m rapid fire pistol	758.7	3rd place, bronze medalist(s)
Samaresh Jung	Men's 25m standard pistol	559	3rd place, bronze medalist(s)
Omkar Singh	Men's 50m pistol	653.6	1st place, gold medalist(s)
Imran Khan	Men's rifle 3 positions	1252.4	4
Gagan Narang	Men's rifle 3 positions	1262.2 GR	1st place, gold medalist(s)
Hariom Singh	Men's 50m rifle prone	689.6	8
Manavjit Singh Sandhu	Men's trap	144	3rd place, bronze medalist(s)
Mansher Singh	Men's trap	137	5
Asher Noria	Men's double trap	186	4
Ronjan Sodhi	Men's double trap	186	2nd place, silver medalist(s)
Gurpreet Singh; Omkar Singh	10m air pistol pairs	1163 GR	1st place, gold medalist(s)
Abhinav Bindra; Gagan Narang	10m air rifle pairs	1193 GR	1st place, gold medalist(s)
Vijay Kumar; Harpreet Singh	25m centre fire pistol pairs	1159	1st place, gold medalist(s)
Vijay Kumar; Gurpreet Singh	25m rapid fire pistol pairs	1162 GR	1st place, gold medalist(s)
Chandrashekar Chaudhary; Samaresh Jung	25m standard pistol pairs	1103	2nd place, silver medalist(s)
Deepak Sharma; Omkar Singh	50m pistol pairs	1087	2nd place, silver medalist(s)
Imran Khan; Gagan Narang	50m rifle 3 positions pairs	2325 GR	1st place, gold medalist(s)
Gagan Narang; Hariom Singh	50m rifle prone pairs	1173	5
Manavjit Singh Sandhu; Mansher Singh	Trap pairs	197	2nd place, silver medalist(s)
Asher Noria; Ronjan Sodhi	Double trap pairs	188	2nd place, silver medalist(s)
Mairaj Khan; Allan Peoples	Skeet pairs	186	5

=== Women ===
Athlete	Event	Final	
Athlete	Event	Total	Rank
Heena Sidhu	Women's 10m air pistol	481.6	2nd place, silver medalist(s)
Annu Raj Singh	Women's 10m air pistol	475.7	4
Suma Shirur	Women's 10m air rifle	495.4	4
Kavitha Yadav	Women's 10m air rifle	495.1	5
Rahi Sarnobat	Women's 25m pistol	781.0	2nd place, silver medalist(s)
Anisa Sayyed	Women's 25m pistol	786.8 GR	1st place, gold medalist(s)
Lajjakumari Gauswami	Women's 50m rifle 3 positions	666.8	6
Meena Kumari	Women's 50m rifle prone	586	7
Tejaswini Sawant	Women's 50m rifle prone	594	2nd place, silver medalist(s)
Shreyasi Singh	Women's trap	85	6
Annu Raj Singh; Heena Sidhu	10m air pistol pairs	759	1st place, gold medalist(s)
Suma Shirur; Kavitha Yadav	10m air rifle pairs	785	3rd place, bronze medalist(s)
Rahi Sarnobat; Anisa Sayyed	25m pistol pairs	1156	1st place, gold medalist(s)
Lajjakumari Gauswami; Tejaswini Sawant	50m rifle 3 positions pairs	1143	2nd place, silver medalist(s)
Meena Kumari; Tejaswini Sawant	50m rifle prone	1168	3rd place, bronze medalist(s)
Shreyasi Singh; Seema Tomar	Trap pairs	89	5

== Squash ==
India's squash team will consist of 10 athletes (5 men and 5 Women).

=== Men ===
Athlete	Event	Group stage			Round of 64	Round of 32	Round of 16	Quarterfinals	Semifinals	Final / BM	
Athlete	Event	Opposition Result	Opposition Result	Rank	Opposition Result	Opposition Result	Opposition Result	Opposition Result	Opposition Result	Opposition Result	Rank
Saurav Ghosal	Singles	—N/a			Rukunya (UGA); W 11–1 11–4 11–0	Paterson (SCO); W 11–6 11–6 11–7	Barker (ENG); L 5–11 9–11 13–11 0–11	did not advance			
Sandeep Jangra	Singles	—N/a			Cuskelly (AUS); L 7–11 9–11 4–11	did not advance					
Harinder Pal Sandhu	Singles	—N/a			Pervez (BAN); W 11–3 11–1 11–2	Boswell (AUS); L 4–11 7–11 5–11	did not advance				
Siddharth Suchde	Singles	—N/a			Hopkins (JER); W 11–6 11–5 11–4	Pilley (AUS); L 8–11 11–9 6–11 7–11	did not advance				
Sandeep Jangra; Harinder Pal Sandhu	Men's doubles	Malaysia; L 1-2	Uganda; W 2-1	2 Q	—N/a		Scotland; L 0-2	did not advance			
Gaurav Nandrajog; Siddharth Suchde	Men's doubles	Scotland; L 0-2	Kenya; W 2-0	2 Q	—N/a		Malaysia; L 0-2	did not advance			

=== Women ===
Athlete	Event	Group stage			Round of 32	Round of 16	Quarterfinals	Semifinals	Final / BM	
Athlete	Event	Opposition Result	Opposition Result	Rank	Opposition Result	Opposition Result	Opposition Result	Opposition Result	Opposition Result	Rank
Anaka Alamkamony	Singles	—N/a			Kippax (CAN); L 7–11 4–11 3–11	did not advance				
Joshna Chinappa	Singles	—N/a			Wee (MAS); W 11–1 11–4 8–11 11–4	David (MAS); L 5–11 10–12 7–11	did not advance			
Surbi Mishra	Singles	—N/a			Edmison (CAN); L 2–11 7–11 10–12	did not advance				
Anwesha Reddy	Singles	—N/a			Miller (CAN); L 3–11 6–11 7–11	did not advance				
Anaka Alamkamony; Surbi Mishra	Women's doubles	Malaysia; L 0-2	England; L 0-2	3	did not advance					

== Swimming ==
India's swimming team consisted of 20 swimmers.

=== Men ===
Athlete	Event	Heat		Semifinal		Final	
Athlete	Event	Time	Rank	Time	Rank	Time	Rank
Arjun Jayaprakash	50m freestyle	24.75	31	did not advance			
Anshul Kothari	50m freestyle	24.56	28	did not advance			
Aaron D'Souza	100m freestyle	52.46	6	did not advance			
Virdhawal Khade	100m freestyle	50.67	5 Q	50.10	6	did not advance	
Anshul Kothari	100m freestyle	53.48	7	did not advance			
Aaron D'Souza	200m freestyle	1:54.10	7	did not advance			
Rohit Havaldar	200m freestyle	1:58.15	7	did not advance			
Mandar Divase	400m freestyle	4:06.02	7	did not advance			
Ullalmath Gagan	400m freestyle	4:06.29	6	did not advance			
Mandar Divase	1500m freestyle	16:22.49	6	did not advance			
Ullalmath Gagan	1500m freestyle	16:14.12	5	did not advance			
Badrinath Melkote	50m backstroke	27.52	14 Q	27.26	12	did not advance	
Praveen Tokas	50m backstroke	29.16	20	did not advance			
Balakrishnan Melkote	100m backstroke	59.03	14 Q	59.25	7	did not advance	
Rohit Havaldar	200m backstroke	2:09.45	6	did not advance			
Rehan Poncha	200m backstroke	2:09.71	5	did not advance			
Praveen Tokas	200m backstroke	2:12.67	6	did not advance			
Agnishwar Jayaprakash	50m breaststroke	29.66	11 Q	28.74	6	did not advance	
Puneet Rana	50m breaststroke	30.45	13 Q	30.12	7	did not advance	
Sandeep Sejwal	50m breaststroke	28.58	4 Q	28.82	8 Q	28.85	8
Agnishwar Jayaprakash	100m breaststroke	1:06.28	7	did not advance			
Puneet Rana	100m breaststroke	1:05.97	1	did not advance			
Sandeep Sejwal	100m breaststroke	1:02.72	4 Q	1:03.13	7	did not advance	
Puneet Rana	200m breaststroke	2:25.58	6	did not advance			
Sandeep Sejwal	200m breaststroke	2:17.13	4	did not advance			
Virdhawal Khade	50m butterfly	24.72	8 Q	24.38	7 Q	24.29	6
Virdhawal Khade	100m butterfly	55.17	13 Q	54.34	9	did not advance	
Arjun Muralidharan	100m butterfly	57.24	20	did not advance			
Rehan Poncha	200m butterfly	2:04.20	6	did not advance			
Tarun Tokas	200m butterfly	2:14.09	7	did not advance			
Agnishwar Jayaprakash	200m individual medley	2:10.51	7	did not advance			
Rehan Poncha	200m individual medley	2:09.64	6	did not advance			
Merwyn Chen	400m individual medley	4:51.33	8	did not advance			
Rehan Poncha	400m individual medley	4:44.95	7	did not advance			
Aaron D'Souza; Arjun Jayaprakash; Anshul Kothari; Virdhawal Khade	4 x 100m freestyle relay	3:28.06	6 Q	—N/a		3:27.14	6
Mandar Divase; Aaron D'Souza; Rohit Havaldar; Rehan Poncha	4 x 200m freestyle relay	7:49.20	5 Q	—N/a		7:46.18	7
Aaron D'Souza; Virdhawal Khade; Balakrishnan Melkote; Sandeep Sejwal	4 x 100m medley relay	3:54.78	4 Q	—N/a		3:47.23	6

=== Women ===
Athlete	Event	Heat		Semifinal		Final	
Athlete	Event	Time	Rank	Time	Rank	Time	Rank
Jyotsna Pansare	100m freestyle	1:01.42	5	did not advance			
Talasha Prabhu	100m freestyle	1:00.41	2	did not advance			
Arti Ghorpade	200m freestyle	2:12.20	1	did not advance			
Surabhi Tipre	200m freestyle	2:09.82	7	did not advance			
Richa Mishra	400m freestyle	4:30.70	7	did not advance			
Surabhi Tipre	400m freestyle	4:31.67	5	did not advance			
Richa Mishra	800m freestyle	9:11.09	5	did not advance			
Fariha Zaman	50m backstroke	31.34	15 Q	31.35	7	did not advance	
Jyotsna Pansare	100m backstroke	1:10.07	7	did not advance			
Fariha Zaman	100m backstroke	1:10.38	1	did not advance			
Arti Ghorpade	200m backstroke	2:33.95	6	did not advance			
Ananya Panigrahi	200m backstroke	2:34.27	5	did not advance			
Pooja Alva	50m butterfly	30.30	6	did not advance			
Shubha Chittaranjan	50m butterfly	29.96	2 Q	30.00	8	did not advance	
Pooja Alva	100m butterfly	1:04.53	5 Q	1:04.93	8	did not advance	
Shubha Chittaranjan	100m butterfly	1:06.84	1	did not advance			
Pooja Alva	200m butterfly	2:24.74	6	did not advance			
Aditi Dhumatkar	200m butterfly	2:29.86	7	did not advance			
Pooja Alva	200m individual medley	2:32.11	7	did not advance			
Kanch Desai	400m individual medley	5:28.41	7	did not advance			
Richa Mishra	400m individual medley	5:03.72	7	did not advance			
Jyotsna Pansare; Talasha Prabhu; Sneha Thirugnanasambandam; Surabhi Tipre	4 x 100m freestyle relay	—N/a				4:02.55	7
Arti Ghorpade; Talasha Prabhu; Sneha Thirugnanasambandam; Surabhi Tipre	4 x 200m freestyle relay	—N/a				8:56.59	8
Pooja Alva; Jyotsna Pansare; Talasha Prabhu; Poorva Shetye	4 x 100m medley relay	—N/a				4:37.97	8

=== Paralympic swimming ===
Athlete	Event	Heat		Final	
Athlete	Event	Time	Rank	Time	Rank
Prasanta Karmakar	Men's 50m freestyle S9	27.69	3 Q	27.48	3rd place, bronze medalist(s)
Rajesh Shinde	Men's 50m freestyle S9	32.96	10	did not advance	
Sachin Verma	Men's 50m freestyle S9	29.05	8 Q	29.37	8
Sharath Gayakwad	Men's 100m freestyle S8	—N/a		1:04.18	5
Naveen Kumar	Men's 100m freestyle S8	—N/a		1:25.24	7
Chetan Raut	Men's 100m freestyle S10	1:05.59	7 q	1:05.27	7
Rimo Saha	Men's 100m freestyle S10	1:07.62	8 q	1:07.80	8
Anjali Patel	Women's 50m freestyle S9	47.64	8 Q	46.25	8
Vineeta Pathak	Women's 50m freestyle S9	52.58	9	did not advance	
Kiran Tak	Women's 50m freestyle S9	38.79	7 Q	38.74	7
Anjani Patel	Women's 100m freestyle S9	1:46.68	8 q	1:48.11	8
Vineeta Pathak	Women's 100m freestyle S9	1:58.29	10	did not advance	
Kiran Tak	Women's 100m freestyle S9	1:27.02	7 q	1:28.34	7
Kiran Tak	Women's 100m butterfly S9	—N/a		1:53.00	7

== Synchronized swimming ==
India competed in synchronized swimming at the 2010 Games.

Athlete	Event	Technical Routine	Free Routine	Total	
Athlete	Event	Points	Points	Total Points	Rank
Avani Dave	Solo	26.000	26.417	52.417	8
Kavita Kolapkar; Bijal Vasant	Duet	25.000	25.917	50.917	7

== Table tennis ==
India's table tennis team consisted of 10 athletes and 4 reserves

=== Men ===
Athlete	Event	Round of 32	Round of 16	Quarterfinals	Semifinals	Final / BM	
Athlete	Event	Opposition Result	Opposition Result	Opposition Result	Opposition Result	Opposition Result	Rank
Sharath Kamal	Men's singles	Overmeyer (RSA); W 4–0	Gavin (SCO); W 4–1	Ma (SIN); W 4–1	Yang (SIN); L 2–3	Roy (IND); W 4–0	3rd place, bronze medalist(s)
Soumyadeep Roy	Men's singles	Howieson (SCO); W 4–3	Henzell (AUS); W 4–3	Cai (SIN); W 4–1	Gao (SIN); L 0–4	Kamal (IND); L 0–4	4
Amalraj Anthony Arputharaj	Men's singles	Han (AUS); W 4–1	Yiangou (CYP); W 4–3	Gao (SIN); L 1–4	did not advance		
Subhajit Saha	Men's singles	Ho (AUS); W 4–0	Yang (SIN); L 0–4	did not advance			
Abishek Ravichandran	Men's singles	Pang (SIN); W 4–3	Drinkhall (ENG); L 4–3	did not advance			
Sharath Kamal; Subhajit Saha	Men's doubles	Li / Arnachellum (MRI); W 3–0	Han / Gerada (AUS); W 3–2	Ajetunmobi / Quadri (NGR); W 3–1	Baggaley / Pitchford (ENG); W 3–2	Gao / Yang (SIN); W 3–2	1st place, gold medalist(s)
Amalraj Anthony Arputharaj; Soumyadeep Roy	Men's doubles	Kao / Tan (MAS); W 3–0	Lewis / David (GUY); W 3–0	Gao / Yang (SIN); L 0–3	did not advance		

=== Women ===
Athlete	Event	Round of 32	Round of 16	Quarterfinals	Semifinals	Final / BM	
Athlete	Event	Opposition Result	Opposition Result	Opposition Result	Opposition Result	Opposition Result	Rank
Mouma Das	Women's singles	Yuen (CAN); W 4–1	Yu (SIN); L 0–4	did not advance			
Poulomi Ghatak	Women's singles	Na (NIR); L 3–4	did not advance				
Shamini Kumaresan	Women's singles	Zhang (CAN); L 2–4	did not advance				
Patkar Madhurika Suhas	Women's singles	Hicks (ENG); W 4–0	Feng (SIN); L 2–4	did not advance			
Prabhu Mamta	Women's singles	Li (SIN); L 0–4	did not advance				
Madhurika Suhas Patkar; Shamini Kumaresan	Women's doubles	Nelson / Givan (NIR); W 3–0	Owusu-Agyei / Ketu (GHA); W 3–0	Feng / Wang (SIN); L 1–3	did not advance		
Mouma Das; Poulomi Ghatak	Women's doubles	Owen / Phillips (WAL); W 3–0	Na / Mogey (NIR); W 3–0	Fang / Miao (AUS); W 3–2	Li / Sun (SIN); L 0–3	Tan / Campbell-Innes (AUS); W 3–0	3rd place, bronze medalist(s)

=== Teams ===
Athlete	Event	Group stage				Round of 16	Quarterfinals	Semifinals	Final / BM	
Athlete	Event	Opposition Result	Opposition Result	Opposition Result	Rank	Opposition Result	Opposition Result	Opposition Result	Opposition Result	Rank
Sharath Kamal; Subhajit Saha; Soumyadeep Roy; Anthony Arputhraj Amalraj; Ravichandran Abishek	Men's team	Vanuatu; W 3-0	Guyana; W 3-0	—N/a	1 Q	Bye	South Africa; W 3-1	England; L 1-3	Nigeria; W 3-0	3rd place, bronze medalist(s)
Madhurika Suhas Patkar; Mouma Das; Poulomi Ghatak; Shamini Kumaresan	Women's team	Sri Lanka; W 3-0	New Zealand; L 2-3	Ghana; W 3-0	2 Q	—N/a	Australia; W 3–1	England; W 3–0	Singapore; L 0–3	2nd place, silver medalist(s)

== Tennis ==
India selected top stars such as Leander Paes and Mahesh Bhupathi.

=== Men ===
Athlete	Event	Round of 32	Round of 16	Quarterfinals	Semifinals	Final / BM	
Athlete	Event	Opposition Score	Opposition Score	Opposition Score	Opposition Score	Opposition Score	Rank
Rohan Bopanna	Men's singles	Buyinza (UGA); W 6–1 6–4	Luczak (AUS); L 2–6 6–7	did not advance			
Somdev Devvarman	Men's singles	Devin (BAH); W 6–4 6–2	Amresh (SRI); W 6–0 6–1	Statham (NZL); W 6–3 6–4	Ebden (AUS); W 6–3 6–1	Jones (AUS); W 6–4 6–2	1st place, gold medalist(s)
Mahesh Bhupathi; Leander Paes	Men's doubles	—N/a	Dineshkanthan / Jayawickreme (SRI); W 6–3 6–3	Ward / Goodall (ENG); W 6–2 6–7 (4) 7–6 (4)	Luczak / Hanley (AUS); L 2–6 2–6	Bopanna / Devvarman (IND); W 6–3 7–6 (4)	3rd place, bronze medalist(s)
Rohan Bopanna & Somdev Devvarman	Men's doubles	—N/a	Fleming / Murray (SCO); W 6–3 6–1	Ebden / Jones (AUS); W 7–6 (5) 6–4	Hutchins / Skupski (ENG); L 6–3 3–6 4–6	Bhupathi / Paes (IND); L 3–6, 6–7 (4)	4

=== Women ===
Athlete	Event	Round of 32	Round of 16	Quarterfinals	Semifinals	Final / BM	
Athlete	Event	Opposition Score	Opposition Score	Opposition Score	Opposition Score	Opposition Score	Rank
Rushmi Chakravarthi	Women's singles	Montlha (LES); W 6–0 6–1	O'Brien (ENG); W 1–6 7–6 7–5	Rogowska (AUS); L 5–7 4–6	did not advance		
Sania Mirza	Women's singles	Bye	Teei (COK); W 6–0 6–2	Erakovic (NZL); W 6–2 6–3	Rogowska (AUS); W 1–6 6–4 6–4	Rodionova (AUS); L 3–6 6–2 6–7	2nd place, silver medalist(s)
Poojashree Venkatesha	Women's singles	Nqosa (LES); W 6–0 6–0	Watson (GGY); L 6–7 3–6	did not advance			
Sania Mirza; Rushmi Chakravarthi	Women's doubles	—N/a		Brown / Rae (SCO); W 6–1 7–6 (2)	Peers / Rodionova (AUS); L 4–6 4–6	Sanjeev / Venkatesha (IND); W 6–4 6–2	3rd place, bronze medalist(s)
Nirupama Sanjeev; Poojashree Venkatesha	Women's doubles	—N/a	Solih / Mahir (MDV); W 6–0 6–1	Borwell / Smith (ENG); W 7–5 6–4	Moore / Rogowska (AUS); L 7–5 3–6 5–7	Mirza / Chakravathi (IND); L 4–6 2–6	4

=== Mixed ===
Athlete	Event	Round of 16	Quarterfinals	Semifinals	Final / BM	
Athlete	Event	Opposition Score	Opposition Score	Opposition Score	Opposition Score	Rank
Sania Mirza; Leander Paes	Mixed doubles	Roheman / Richelieu (LCA); W 6–1 6–0	Rae / Fleming (SCO); L 5–7 4–6	did not advance		
Nirupama Sanjeev; Rohan Bopanna	Mixed doubles	Rodionova / Hanley (AUS); L 3–6 6–3 3–6	did not advance			

== Weightlifting ==
=== Men ===
Athlete	Event	Snatch	Clean & Jerk	Total	Rank
Sukhen Dey	56 kg	112.0 kg	140.0 kg	252.0 kg	2nd place, silver medalist(s)
Valluri Srinivasa Rao	56 kg	107.0 kg	141.0 kg	248.0 kg	3rd place, bronze medalist(s)
Rustam Sarang	62 kg	121.0 kg	150.0 kg	271.0 kg	4
Omkar Otari	62 kg	125.0 kg	140.0 kg	265.0 kg	5
Ravi Kumar Katulu	69 kg	146.0 kg GR	175.0 kg GR	321.0 kg GR	1st place, gold medalist(s)
Sudhir Kumar Chitradurga	77 kg	131.0 kg	166.0 kg	297.0 kg	3rd place, bronze medalist(s)
Chandrakant Mali	85 kg	140.0 kg	185.0 kg	325.0 kg	4
Sarabjit Singh	+105 kg	169.0 kg	DNF		

=== Women ===
Athlete	Event	Snatch	Clean & Jerk	Total	Rank
Ngangbam Soniya Chanu	48 kg	73.0 kg	94.0 kg	167.0 kg	2nd place, silver medalist(s)
Atom Sandhya Rani Devi	48 kg	70.0 kg	95.0 kg	165.0 kg	3rd place, bronze medalist(s)
Swati Singh	53 kg	74.0	92.0	166.0	4
Yumnam Renubala Chanu	58 kg	90.0	107.0	197.0	1st place, gold medalist(s)
Monika Devi	75 kg	105 kg	121 kg	216 kg	3rd place, bronze medalist(s)
Srishti Singh	75 kg	90 kg	116 kg	206 kg	7
Geeta Rani	+75 kg	100 kg	135 kg	235 kg	4

=== Powerlifting ===
Athlete	Event	Total	Rank
Farman Basha	Men's open	DNS	
Sachin Chaudhary	Men's open	174.8	8
Rajinder Singh Rahelu	Men's open	190.2	4
Rajdeep Kaur	Women's open	61.2	11
Roshani Rinke	Women's open	68.4	10
Bharti Somkuwar	Women's open	79.5	9

== Wrestling ==
Indian wrestling team consists of 21 wrestlers.

=== Men's freestyle ===
Wrestler	Event	Preliminary	Quarterfinals	Semifinals	Repechage Round 1	Repechage Round 2	Final	Rank
Wrestler	Event	Opposition Result	Opposition Result	Opposition Result	Opposition Result	Opposition Result	Opposition Result	Rank
Anil Kumar	55 kg	Van Wyk (AUS); W 7:0	Hussain (PAK); L 3:5	—N/a	Mwenga (CAN); W 4:0	Kumara (SRI); W 4:0	Pilling (WAL); W 3:0	3rd place, bronze medalist(s)
Yogeshwar Dutt	60 kg	Tarash (AUS); W 13:0	Loots (RSA); W 7:1	Madyarchyk (ENG); W 12:4	—N/a		Mancini (CAN); W 9:2	1st place, gold medalist(s)
Sushil Kumar	66 kg	Tarash (AUS); W 6:0	Salmen (PAK); W 10:0	Jarjou (GAM); W 3:0	—N/a		Heinrich (RSA); W 7:0	1st place, gold medalist(s)
Narsingh Pancham Yadav	74 kg	Bye	Grundy (ENG); W 7:1	MacDonald (CAN); W 3:1	—N/a		Addinall (RSA); W 4:0	1st place, gold medalist(s)
Anuj Kumar	84 kg	Kalokoh (SLE); W 12:0	Keogh (SCO); W 3:0	Dick (NGR); W 2:1	—N/a		Muhammad (PAK); L 3:3	2nd place, silver medalist(s)
Anil Mann	96 kg	Rattigan (ENG); L 2:3	did not advance					
Joginder Kumar	120 kg	—N/a	Cocker (ENG); W 9:0	Roberts (AUS); W 3:0	—N/a		Bhullar (CAN); L 0:4	2nd place, silver medalist(s)

=== Women's freestyle ===
Wrestler	Event	Quarterfinals	Semifinals	Repechage Round 1	Repechage Round 2	Final	Rank
Wrestler	Event	Opposition Result	Opposition Result	Opposition Result	Opposition Result	Opposition Result	Rank
Nirmala Devi	48 kg	—N/a	Leeuw (RSA); W 14:0	—N/a		Huynh (CAN); L 3:7	2nd place, silver medalist(s)
Babita Kumari	51 kg	MacDonald (CAN); W 8:6	Madyarchyk (ENG); W 11:0	—N/a		Nwoye (NGR); L 4:7	2nd place, silver medalist(s)
Geeta Phogat	55 kg	Evans (WAL); W 9:0	Edward (NGR); W 5:1	—N/a		Bensted (AUS); W 11:0	1st place, gold medalist(s)
Alka Tomar	59 kg	Bye	Salmon (ENG); W 4:0	—N/a		Verbeek (CAN); W 3:2	1st place, gold medalist(s)
Suman Kundu	63 kg	Connell (SCO); W 5:0	Oborududu (NGR); L 0:4	Randle (SCO); W 6:0	—N/a	Geringer (RSA); W 9:2	3rd place, bronze medalist(s)
Anita Sheoran	67 kg	Bye	McManus (SCO); W 3:0	—N/a		Buydens (CAN); W 4:1	1st place, gold medalist(s)
Anshu Tomar	72 kg	Okus (NGR); L 3:7	did not advance				

=== Greco-Roman ===
Athlete	Event	Quarterfinals	Semifinals	Repechage Round 1	Repechage Round 2	Final	Rank
Athlete	Event	Opposition Result	Opposition Result	Opposition Result	Opposition Result	Opposition Result	Rank
Rajender Kumar	55 kg	Yaparthna (SRI); W 14:0	Mwenga (CAN); W 11:0	—N/a		Hussain (PAK); W 11:0	1st place, gold medalist(s)
Ravinder Singh	60 kg	Kumara (SRI); W 13:0	Joseph (NGR); W 8:0	—N/a		Bosson (ENG); W 9:0	1st place, gold medalist(s)
Sunil Kumar	66 kg	Dykun (ENG); L 0:5	—N/a		O'Brien (AUS); W 8:3	Hawthorn (WAL); W 11:0	3rd place, bronze medalist(s)
Sanjay Kumar	74 kg	Ekeroma (SAM); W 3:0	Kiriben (NGR); W 2:0	—N/a		Addinall (RSA); W 2:0	1st place, gold medalist(s)
Manoj Kumar	84 kg	Inam (PAK); W W/O	van Zyl (RSA); W4:0	—N/a		Agbonavbare (NGR); L 2:7	2nd place, silver medalist(s)
Anil Kumar	96 kg	Montgomery (NIR); W 13:0	Bella-Lufu (RSA); W 3:1	—N/a		Fkiri (AUS); W 6:0	1st place, gold medalist(s)
Dharmender Dalal	120 kg	Schutte (RSA); W 2:0	Popov (AUS); L 1:6	Cocker (ENG); W 2:0	—N/a	Aparian (CYP); W 12:0	3rd place, bronze medalist(s)
