= Archery at the 2010 Commonwealth Games =

- Venue: Yamuna Sports Complex
- Location: Delhi, India
- Dates: 4 to 13 October 2010

Archery at the 2010 Commonwealth Games was the second appearance of Archery at the Commonwealth Games. Competition was held in Delhi, India, 4 to 13 October 2010 and featured contests in eight events.

The archery events were held at the Yamuna Sports Complex.

This was the second games appearance of the optional Commonwealth Games sport, almost thirty years after its debut at the 1982 Commonwealth Games. Twenty-three nations entered archers into the tournament.

England topped the archery medal table by virtue of winning four gold medals.

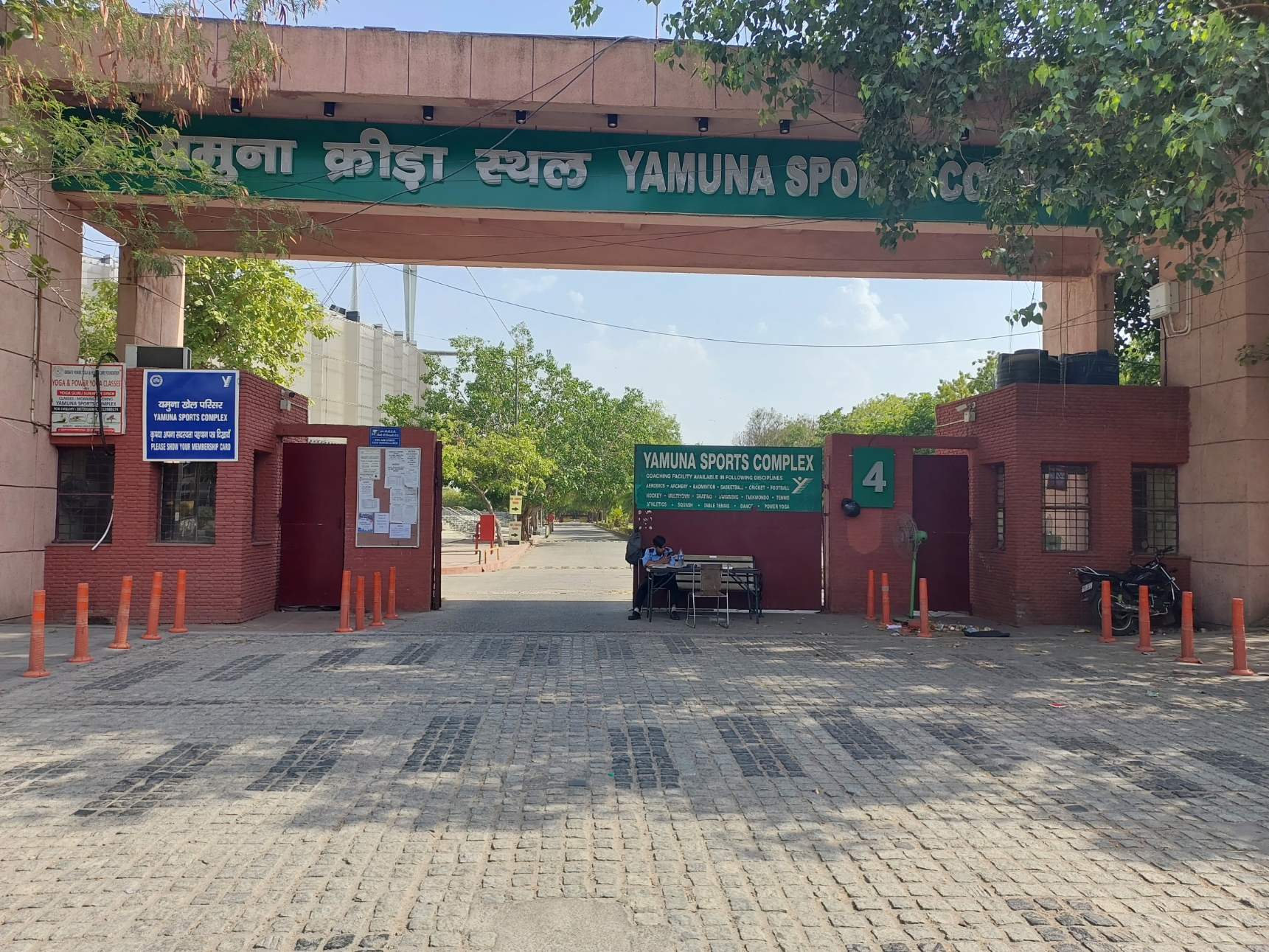
Yamuna Sports Complex

== Medal table ==
Rank	Nation	Gold	Silver	Bronze	Total
1	England	4	3	0	7
2	India	3	1	4	8
3	Australia	1	0	1	2
4	Canada	0	3	1	4
5	Malaysia	0	1	0	1
6	South Africa	0	0	2	2
Totals (6 entries)		8	8	8	24

== Events ==
Archery at the Commonwealth Games is target archery, where competitors shoot arrows at outdoor targets at marked distances. Eight events are included: four each for women and men, with separate events for recurve and compound bows. The events are:

== Medallists ==
=== Men ===
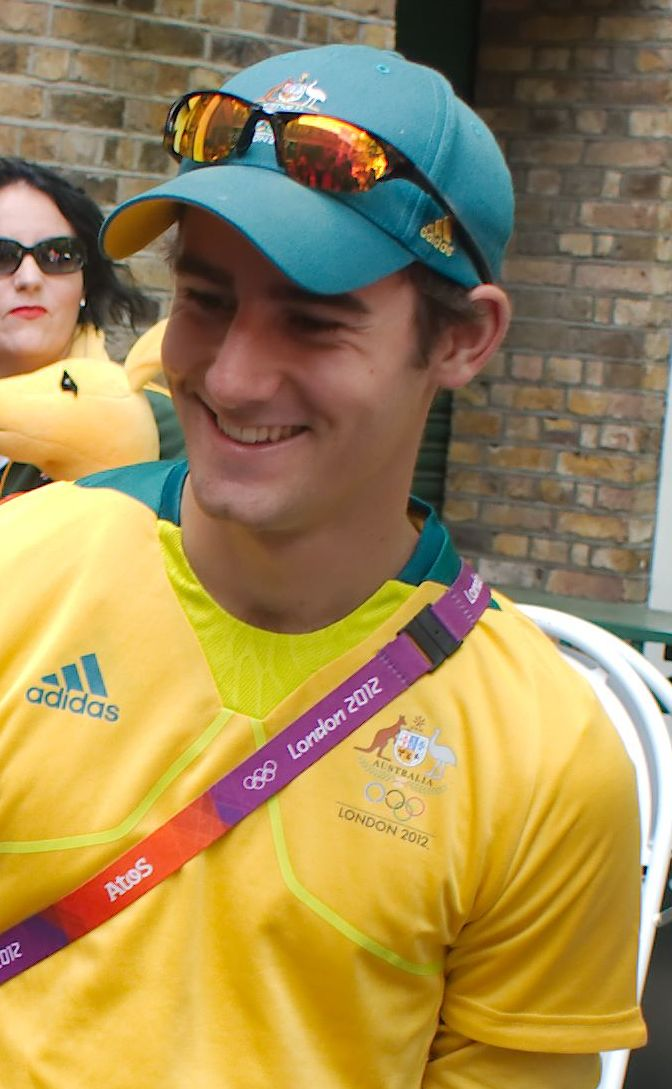
Australian Taylor Worth won a team gold medal

Event	Gold	Silver	Bronze
Men's recurve individual	Rahul Banerjee; India	Jason Lyon; Canada	Jayanta Talukdar; India
Men's recurve team	Matthew Gray; Mat Masonwells and Taylor Worth; Australia	Muhammad Abdul Rahim; Chu Cheng and Arif Ibrahim Putra; Malaysia	Rahul Banerjee; Tarundeep Rai and Jayanta Talukdar; India
Men's compound individual	Duncan Busby; England	Christopher White; England	Septimus Cilliers; South Africa
Men's compound team	Duncan Busby; Liam Grimwood and Christopher White; England	Ritul Chatterjee and Jignas Chittibomma; Chinna Raju Srither; India	Nico Benade; Septimus Cilliers and Kobus de Wet; South Africa

=== Women ===
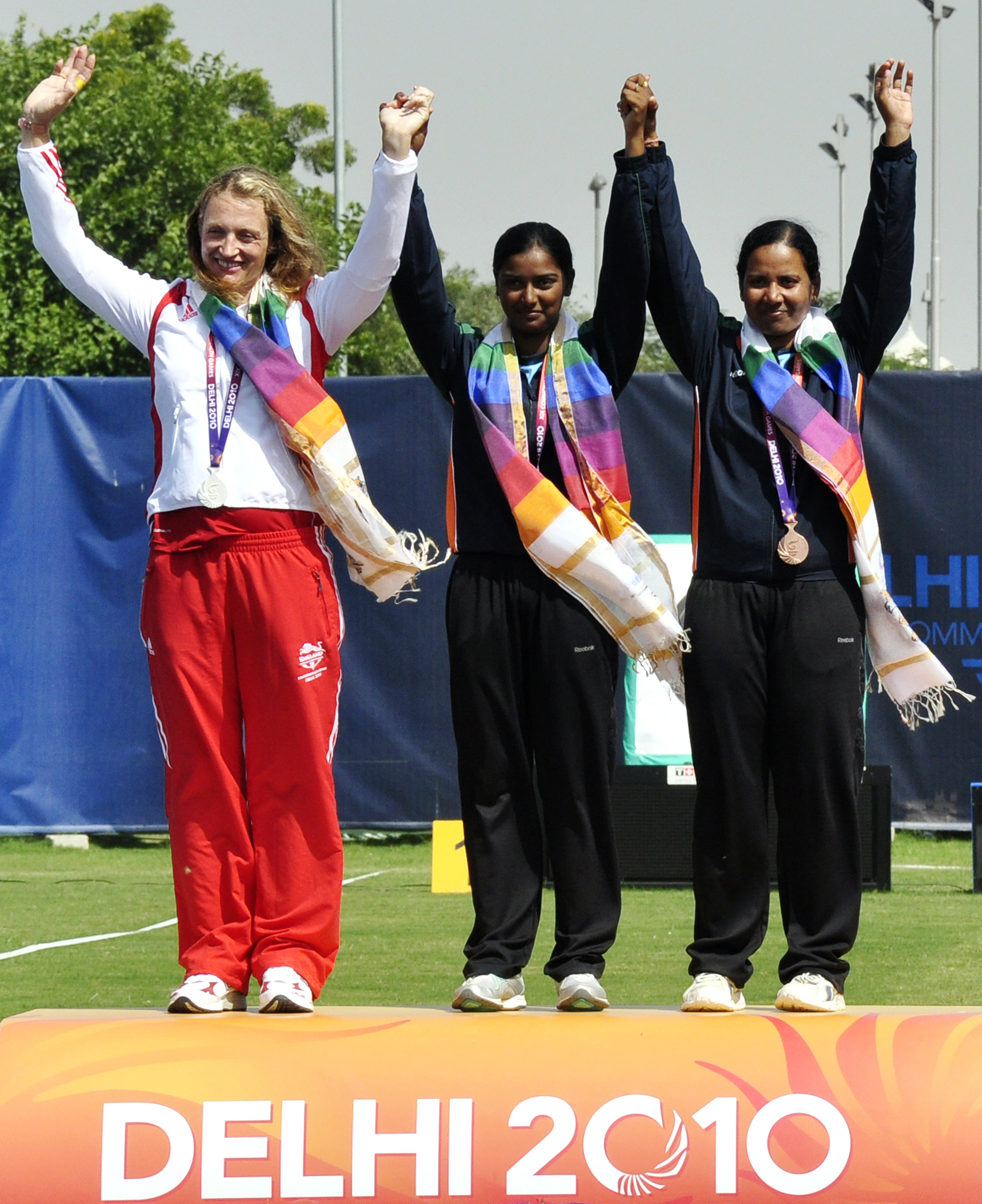
XIX Commonwealth Games-2010 Delhi Archery (Women's Individual Recurve) Deepika Kumari of India (Gold), Alison Jane Williamson of England (Silver) and Dola Banerjee of India (Bronze) during the medal presentation ceremony

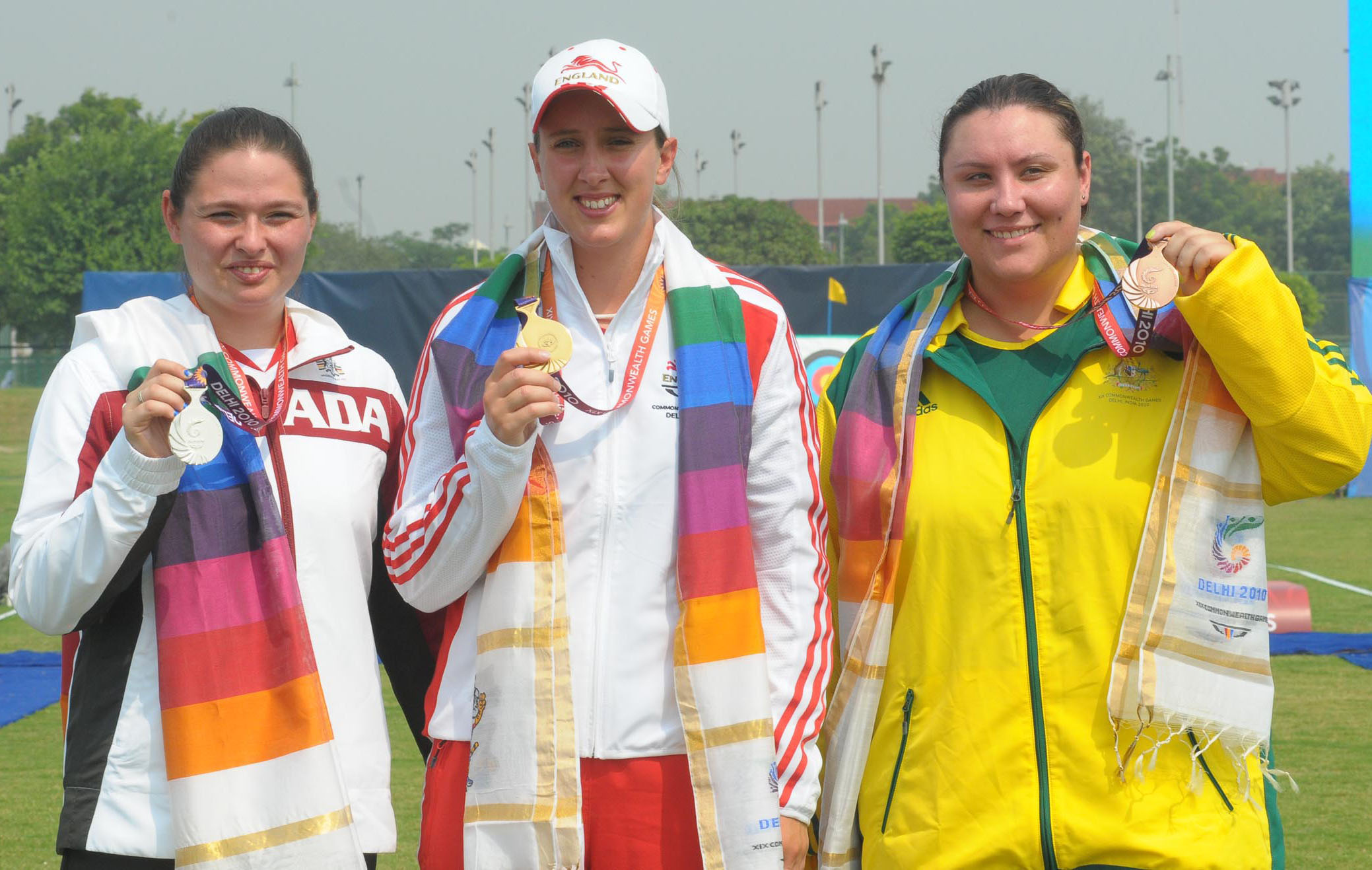
XIX Commonwealth Games-2010 Delhi Winners of (Women's) Archery Individual Compound, Hunt Nicky of England (Gold), DM Jones of Canada (Silver) and C. McCall of Australia (Bronze)

Event	Gold	Silver	Bronze
Women's recurve individual	Deepika Kumari; India	Alison Williamson; England	Dola Banerjee; India
Women's recurve team	Dola Banerjee; Deepika Kumari and Bombayla Devi Laishram; India	Naomi Folkard; Amy Oliver and Alison Williamson; England	Marie-Pier Beaudet; Alana Macdougall and Kateri Vrakking; Canada
Women's compound individual	Nicky Hunt; England	Doris Jones; Canada	Cassie McCall; Australia
Women's compound team	Danielle Brown; Nicky Hunt and Nichola Simpson; England	Camille Bouffard-Demers; Doris Jones and Ashley Wallace; Canada	Bheigyabati Chanu; Jhano Hansdah and Gagandeep Kaur; India

== Participating nations ==
- Australia (12)
- Bangladesh (6)
- Canada (12)
- Cyprus (8)
- England (12)
- India (12)
- Isle of Man (3)
- Jersey (2)
- Kenya (3)
- Malaysia (12)
- Mauritius (5)
- Namibia (3)
- New Zealand (6)
- Norfolk Island (5)
- Northern Ireland (6)
- Samoa (1)
- Scotland (10)
- Singapore (3)
- South Africa (4)
- Sri Lanka (4)
- Tonga (1)
- Trinidad and Tobago (3)
- Uganda (1)
- Wales (6)
