= Shooting at the 2010 Commonwealth Games – Men's 25 metre centre fire pistol singles =

The Men's 25 metre centre fire pistol singles event at the 2010 Commonwealth Games took place on 10 October 2010, at the CRPF Campus.

== Results ==
Rank	Name	Country	Precision	Rapid	Total
1st place, gold medalist(s)	Harpreet Singh	India	288	292	580^{16}
2nd place, silver medalist(s)	Vijay Kumar	India	290	284	574^{20}
3rd place, bronze medalist(s)	Lip Poh	Singapore	291	283	574^{19}
4	Michael Hault	England	287	287	574^{12}
5	Michelangelo Giustiniano	Australia	284	290	574^{19}
6	Bin Gai	Singapore	286	287	574^{14}
7	Metodi Igorov	Canada	283	290	573^{13}
8	Alan Green	Wales	285	85	570^{12}
9	Mustaqeem Shah	Pakistan	284	285	569^{13}
10	David Moore	Australia	287	280	567^{14}
11	Alan Earle	New Zealand	283	284	567^{13}
12	Irshad Ali	Pakistan	282	284	566^{15}
13	Khalel Abdullah	Malaysia	283	282	565^{16}
14	Alan Markewicz	Canada	282	283	565^{13}
15	Rhodney Allen	Trinidad and Tobago	278	286	564^{11}
16	Hasli Amir Hasan	Malaysia	272	290	562^{11}
17	Greg Yelavich	New Zealand	288	273	561^{16}
18	Roger Daniel	Trinidad and Tobago	280	278	558^{8}
19	Robert Doak	Northern Ireland	284	273	557^{13}
20	Steve Pengelly	Wales	284	271	555^{15}
21	Iqbal Ubhi	England	286	269	555^{13}
22	Chester Foster	Barbados	284	271	555^{12}
23	Jonathon Patron	Gibraltar	278	273	551^{10}
24	Hugh Stewart	Northern Ireland	277	272	549^{6}
25	Junior Benskin	Barbados	274	274	548^{5}
26	Stephen Ryan	Norfolk Island	263	271	534^{8}
27	Graham Cock	Norfolk Island	254	259	513^{4}
