= Wrestling at the 2010 Commonwealth Games – Men's Greco-Roman 120 kg =

Men's Greco-Roman 120 kg competition at the 2010 Commonwealth Games in New Delhi, India, was held on 6 October at the Indira Gandhi Arena.

== Medalists ==
Gold	Ivan Popov; Australia
Silver	Talaram Mamman; Nigeria
Bronze	Dharmender Dalal; India

=== Bracket ===
Quarterfinals
Talaram Mamman (NGR)
BYE
Varntan Aparian (CYP)
BYE
Mark Cocker (ENG)	0	0	0
Ivan Popov (AUS)	3	4	0
Dharmender Dalal (IND)	1	1	0
Andries Schutte (RSA)	0	0	0

Semifinals
Talaram Mamman (NGR)	6	0	0
Varntan Aparian (CYP)	0	0	0
Ivan Popov (AUS)	2	0	4
Dharmender Dalal (IND)	0	1	0

Finals
Talaram Mamman (NGR)	0	0	0
Ivan Popov (AUS)	1	7	0

=== Repechage ===
Quarterfinals	Semifinals				Bronze Medal Bout
	BYE
	Varntan Aparian (CYP)
					Varntan Aparian (CYP)	0	0	0
					Dharmender Dalal (IND)	6	6	0
	Mark Cocker (ENG)	0	0	0
	Dharmender Dalal (IND)	1	1	0
