= Archery at the 2010 Commonwealth Games – Women's compound team =

The Women's compound team event took place on 7 October 2010 at the Yamuna Sports Complex.

== Teams ==
Eight teams participated in the competition:

Seed	Country	Athletes
1	Canada	Camil Bouffard-Demers; Doris Jones; Ashley Wallace
2	England	Danielle Brown; Nicky Hunt; Nichola Simpson
3	Scotland	Claudine Jennings; Susan Maitland; Tracey McGowan
4	Australia	Rebecca Darby; Fiona Hyde; Cassie McCall
5	India	Bheigyabati Chanu; Jhano Hansdah; Gagandeep Kaur
6	Malaysia	Saritha Cham Nong; Nor Ishak; Fatin Mat Salleh
7	New Zealand	Stephanie Croskery; Elizabeth Mitchell; Amanda McGregor
8	Wales	Tracey Anderson; Janette Howells; Jeanette Howells

== Results ==
Quarter-finals
Canada	223
Wales	222
India	227
Australia	220
Scotland	216
Malaysia	227
New Zealand	221
England	227

Semi-finals
Canada	224
India	217
Malaysia	221
England	227

Final
Canada	228
England	232
Third place
India	223
Malaysia	219
