= Wrestling at the 2010 Commonwealth Games – Men's Greco-Roman 60 kg =

Men's Greco-Roman 60 kg competition at the 2010 Commonwealth Games in New Delhi, India, was held on 5 October at the Indira Gandhi Arena.

== Medalists ==
| Gold | Ravinder Singh; India |
| Silver | Terence Bosson; England |
| Bronze | Romeo Joseph; Nigeria |

=== Bracket ===
Quarterfinals
Marius Loots (RSA)
BYE
Sarmad Afaq (PAK) | 0 | 0 | 0
Terence Bosson (ENG) | 6 | 3 | 0
Masoud Sadegh Pour (AUS) | 0 | 0 | 0
Romeo Joseph (NGR) | 2 | 3 | 0
Ravinder Singh (IND) | 7 | 6 | 0
A.S.S.D Kumara (SRI) | 0 | 0 | 0

Semifinals
Marius Loots (RSA) | 0 | 0 | 0
Terence Bosson (ENG) | 6 | 3 | 0
Romeo Joseph (NGR) | 0 | 0 | 0
Ravinder Singh (IND) | 2 | 6 | 0

Finals
Terence Bosson (ENG) | 0 | 0 | 0
Ravinder Singh (IND) | 2 | 7 | 0

=== Repechage ===
| Quarterfinals | Semifinals | | | | Bronze Medal Bout |
| | Sarmad Afaq (PAK) | 0 | 0 | 0 |
| | Marius Loots (RSA) | 7 | 2 | 0 |
| | | | | | Marius Loots (RSA) | 0 | 0 | 0 |
| | | | | | Romeo Joseph (NGR) | 1 | 3 | 0 |
| | A.S.S.D Kumara (SRI) | 0 | 0 | 0 |
| | Romeo Joseph (NGR) | 7 | 7 | 0 |
