= Wrestling at the 2010 Commonwealth Games – Men's freestyle 120 kg =

Men's freestyle 120 kg competition at the 2010 Commonwealth Games in New Delhi, India, was held on 10 October at the Indira Gandhi Arena.

== Medalists ==
Gold	Arjan Bhullar; Canada
Silver	Joginder Kumar; India
Bronze	Thiery Onanena; Cameroon

=== Bracket ===
Quarterfinals
Denis Roberts (AUS)	1	3	0
Andries Schutte (RSA)	0	0	0
Joginder Kumar (IND)	5	4	0
Mark Cocker (ENG)	0	0	0
Thiery Onanena (CMR)	0	1	0
Arjan Bhullar (CAN)	1	1	0
Varntan Aparian (CYP)	0	0	0
Nick Lane (NZL)	7	6	0

Semifinals
Denis Roberts (AUS)	0	0	0
Joginder Kumar (IND)	2	1	0
Arjan Bhullar (CAN)	4	6	0
Nick Lane (NZL)	0	0	0

Finals
Joginder Kumar (IND)	0	0	0
Arjan Bhullar (CAN)	1	3	0

=== Repechage ===
Quarterfinals	Semifinals				Bronze Medal Bout
	Mark Cocker (ENG)	0	0	0
	Denis Roberts (AUS)	2	1	0
					Denis Roberts (AUS)	1	2	0
					Thiery Onanena (CMR)	0	3	1
	Thiery Onanena (CMR)	1	3	0
	Nick Lane (NZL)	1	0	0
