= Athletics at the 2010 Commonwealth Games – Women's discus throw =

Women's discus throw at the Commonwealth Games

The Women's discus throw at the 2010 Commonwealth Games as part of the athletics programme was held at the Jawaharlal Nehru Stadium on Monday 11 October 2010.

== Records ==
World Record	76.80	Gabriele Reinsch	GDR	Neubrandenburg, East Germany	9 July 1988
Games Record	65.92	Beatrice Faumuina	NZL	Kuala Lumpur, Malaysia	20 September 1998

== Results ==
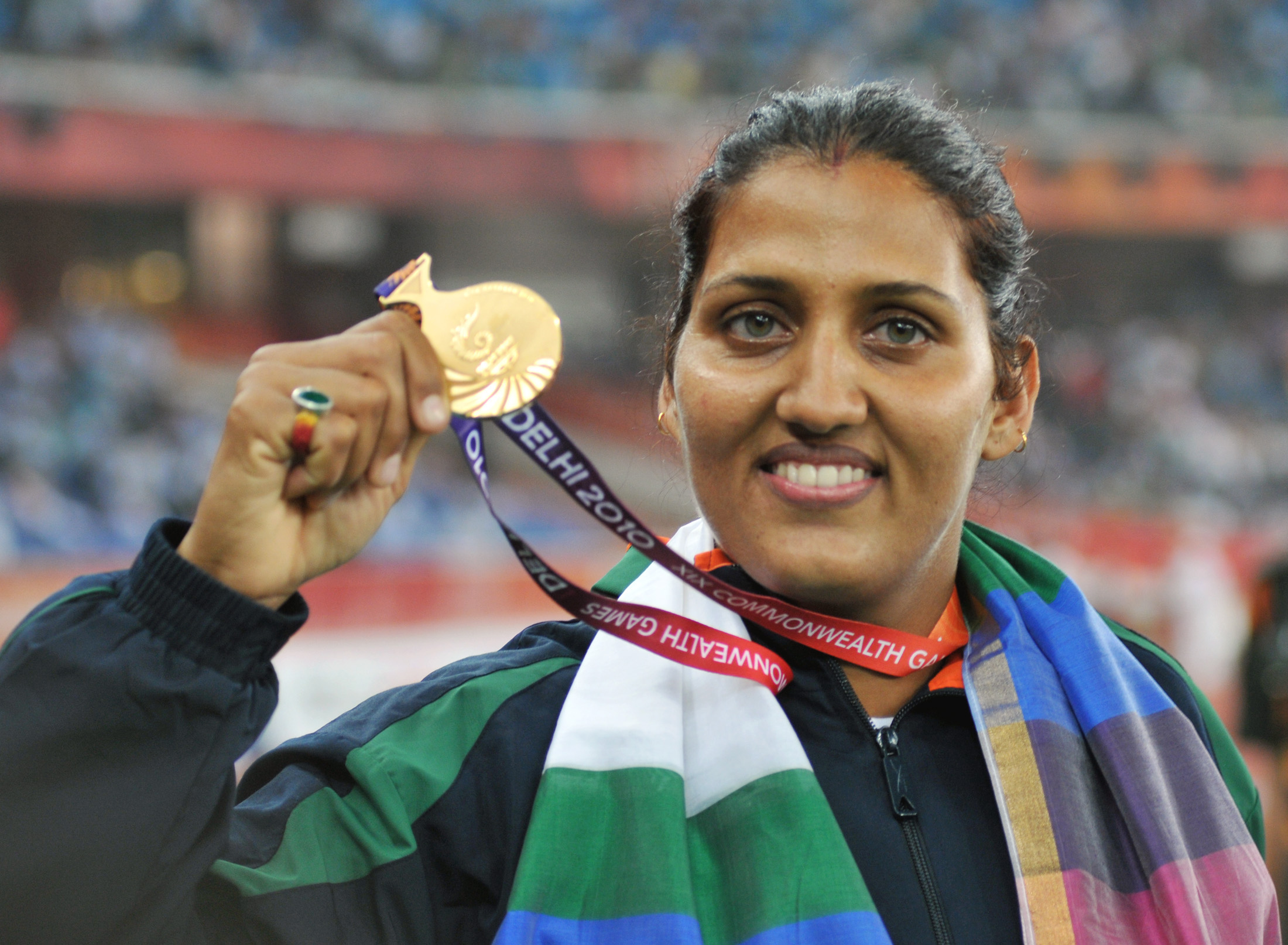
XIX Commonwealth Games-2010 Delhi Krishna Poonia of India won the Gold medal in Women’s Discus event, at Jawaharlal Nehru Stadium, in New Delhi on October 11, 2010

Rank	Athlete	1	2	3	4	5	6	Result	Notes
1st place, gold medalist(s)	Krishna Poonia (IND)	61.51	x	x	58.80	x	58.27	61.51	
2nd place, silver medalist(s)	Harwant Kaur (IND)	58.59	57.21	60.16	57.98	59.54	58.38	60.16	
3rd place, bronze medalist(s)	Seema Antil (IND)	55.25	58.46	x	56.07	56.89	57.94	58.46	
4	Philippa Roles (WAL)	57.99	x	x	56.15	56.59	56.01	57.99	
5	Beatrice Faumuina (NZL)	56.15	x	55.31	57.79	x	54.83	57.79	
6	Jade Nicholls (ENG)	54.79	57.62	56.42	x	x	x	57.62	
7	Elizna Naudé (RSA)	53.17	55.06	x	55.91	57.61	x	57.61	
8	Melissa Alfred (DMA)	42.09	x	38.66	x	x	x	42.09	PB
9	Kathryn Rothwell (JER)	x	x	x				NM	
10	Margaret Satupai (SAM)							DNS	
