= Wrestling at the 2010 Commonwealth Games – Women's freestyle 51 kg =

Women's freestyle 51 kg competition at the 2010 Commonwealth Games in New Delhi, India, was held on 8 October at the Indira Gandhi Arena.

== Medalists ==
Gold	Ifeoma Nwoye; Nigeria
Silver	Babita Kumari; India
Bronze	Jessica MacDonald; Canada

=== Bracket ===
Quarterfinals
Jo Madyarchyk (ENG)
BYE
Babita Kumari (IND)	0	3	5
Jessica MacDonald (CAN)	6	0	0
Donna Robertson (SCO)	0	2	0
Mpho Madi (RSA)	3	4	0
Ifeoma Nwoye (NGR)	3	0	0
Sian Law (NZL)	3	0	0

Semifinals
Jo Madyarchyk (ENG)	0	0	0
Babita Kumari (IND)	6	5	0
Mpho Madi (RSA)	0	0	0
Ifeoma Nwoye (NGR)	5	3	0

Finals
Babita Kumari (IND)	0	4	0
Ifeoma Nwoye (NGR)	2	5	0

=== Repechage ===
Quarterfinals	Semifinals				Bronze Medal Bout
	Jessica MacDonald (CAN)	9	7
	Jo Madyarchyk (ENG)	2	0
					Jessica MacDonald (CAN)	8	0	0
					Mpho Madi (RSA)	0	0	0
	Sian Law (NZL)	0	0	0
	Mpho Madi (RSA)	5	2	0
