= Wrestling at the 2010 Commonwealth Games – Women's freestyle 48 kg =

Women's freestyle 48 kg competition at the 2010 Commonwealth Games in New Delhi, India, was held on 7 October at the Indira Gandhi Arena.

== Medalists ==
Gold	Carol Huynh; Canada
Silver	Nirmala Devi; India
Bronze	Odunayo Adekuroye; Nigeria

=== Bracket ===
Quarterfinals
Brumilda Leeuw (RSA)
BYE
Nirmala Devi (IND)
BYE
Carol Huynh (CAN)	2	4	0
Odunayo Adekuroye (NGR)	3	4	0
Fiona Robertson (SCO)	1	1	0
Kiran Manu (WAL)	0	0	0

Semifinals
Brumilda Leeuw (RSA)	0	0	0
Nirmala Devi (IND)	7	7	0
Carol Huynh (CAN)	4	0	0
Fiona Robertson (SCO)	0	0	0

Finals
Nirmala Devi (IND)	1	2	0
Carol Huynh (CAN)	3	4	0

=== Repechage ===
Quarterfinals	Semifinals				Bronze Medal Bout
	BYE
	Brumilda Leeuw (RSA)
					Brumilda Leeuw (RSA)	0	0	0
					Odunayo Adekuroye (NGR)	7	7	0
	Odunayo Adekuroye (NGR)	7	7	0
	Fiona Robertson (SCO)	0	0	0
