= Wrestling at the 2010 Commonwealth Games – Men's freestyle 84 kg =

Sports Event

Men's freestyle 84 kg competition at the 2010 Commonwealth Games in New Delhi, India, was held on 10 October at the Indira Gandhi Arena.

== Medalists ==
Gold	Muhammad Inam; Pakistan
Silver	Anuj Kumar; India
Bronze	Andrew Dick; Nigeria

=== Bracket ===
Preliminary
Abdul Kalokoh (SLE)	0	0	0
Anuj Kumar (IND)	6	6	0
Steve Hill (NZL)	1	5	1
Sean Keogh (SCO)	3	0	7
Jag Bhullar (ENG)	3	1	0
Gene Kapaufs (AUS)	3	5	5
Danny Brown (CAN)	0	1	0
Andrew Dick (NGR)	1	0	1

Quarterfinals
Muhammad Inam (PAK)	6	6	0
Elvis Malaba (KEN)	0	0	0
Gerald Meyer (RSA)	2	4	0
Abraham Vassalo (MLT)	0	0	0
Anuj Kumar (IND)	2	1	0
Sean Keogh (SCO)	0	0	0
Gene Kapaufs (AUS)	0	0	0
Andrew Dick (NGR)	3	3	0

Semifinals
Muhammad Inam (PAK)	1	2	0
Gerald Meyer (RSA)	0	1	0
Anuj Kumar (IND)	1	1	0
Andrew Dick (NGR)	0	1	0

Final
Muhammad Inam (PAK)	2	1	1
Anuj Kumar (IND)	3	0	0

=== Repechage ===
Repechage round 1
Abdul Kalokoh (SLE)	0	0
Sean Keogh (SCO)	0	0

Repechage round 2
Elvis Malaba (KEN)	0	0
Gerald Meyer (RSA)	7	4
Sean Keogh (SCO)	0	0
Andrew Dick (NGR)	2	4

Bronze medals
Gerald Meyer (RSA)	0	1	0
Andrew Dick (NGR)	3	1	0
Gerald Meyer (RSA)	0	1	0
Andrew Dick (NGR)	3	1	0
