= Archery at the 2010 Commonwealth Games – Men's compound team =

The Men's compound team event took place on 7 October 2010 at the Yamuna Sports Complex.

== Teams ==
Fifteen teams participated in the competition:

Seed	Country	Athletes
1	England	Duncan Busby; Liam Grimwood; Christopher White
2	South Africa	Nico Benade; Septimus Cilliers; Jacobus de Wet
3	New Zealand	Stephen Clifton; Shaun Teasdale; Anthony Waddick
4	Australia	Patrick Coghlan; Clint Freeman; Robert Timms
5	Canada	Nathan Cameron; Andrew Fagan; Michael Schleppe
6	India	Ritul Chatterjee; Jignas Chittibomma; Chinna Srither
7	Namibia	Dirk Bockmuhl; Johannes Grobler; Benjamin van Wyk
8	Northern Ireland	Robert Hall; Darrel Wilson; Stuart Wilson

Seed	Country	Athletes
9	Scotland	Kyle Dods; Timothy Keppie; Alistair Whittingham
10	Wales	Tapani Kalmaru; Andrew Rose; Geraint Thomas
11	Trinidad and Tobago	Hasmath Ali; Rakesh Sookoo; George Vire
12	Malaysia	Mohd Ashah; Hon Lang; Muhammad Mahazan
13	Norfolk Island	Michael Graham; Robert Kemp; Jonathan Snell
14	Cyprus	Marios Perdikos; Christodoulos Protopapas; Dimitris Vasileiou
15	Bangladesh	Mohammad Hossain; Abul Mamun; Mohammad Uddin

== Results ==
First Round
8	Scotland	224
8	Northern Ireland	225
5	Canada	225
12	Malaysia	230
13	Norfolk Island	209
4	Australia	234
3	New Zealand	230
14	Cyprus	221
11	Trinidad and Tobago	219
6	India	224
7	Namibia	226
10	Wales	221
15	Bangladesh	206
2	South Africa	233

Quarterfinals
1	England	232
8	Northern Ireland	224
12	Malaysia	220
4	Australia	232
3	New Zealand	225
6	India	226
7	Namibia	228
2	South Africa	234

Semifinals
1	England	228
4	Australia	224
6	India	226
2	South Africa	224

Finals
1	England	231
6	India	229
Third place
4	Australia	232
2	South Africa	234
