= Wrestling at the 2010 Commonwealth Games – Women's freestyle 67 kg =

Women's freestyle 67 kg competition at the 2010 Commonwealth Games in New Delhi, India, was held on 8 October at the Indira Gandhi Arena.

== Medalists ==
Gold	Anita Sheoran; India
Silver	Megan Buydens; Canada
Bronze	Ifeoma Iheanacho; Nigeria

=== Bracket ===
Quarterfinals
Anita Sheoran (IND)
BYE
Ashlea McManus (SCO)	6	4	0
Sarah Connolly (WAL)	0	2	0
Justine Kalauni (NIU)	0	0	0
Emma Chalmers (AUS)	4	0	0
Ifeoma Iheanacho (NGR)	4	3	0
Andries Schutte (RSA)	4	2	1

Semifinals
Anita Sheoran (IND)	1	2	0
Ashlea McManus (SCO)	0	0	0
Emma Chalmers (AUS)	0	0	0
Megan Buydens (CAN)	7	4	0

Finals
Anita Sheoran (IND)	1	3	0
Megan Buydens (CAN)	0	1	0

=== Repechage ===
Quarterfinals	Semifinals				Bronze Medal Bout
	BYE
	Ashlea McManus (SCO)
					Ashlea McManus (SCO)	0	0	0
					Ifeoma Iheanacho (NGR)	4	3	0
	Ifeoma Iheanacho (NGR)	6	7	0
	Emma Chalmers (AUS)	0	0	0
