= Wrestling at the 2010 Commonwealth Games – Men's Greco-Roman 84 kg =

Men's Greco-Roman 84 kg competition at the 2010 Commonwealth Games in New Delhi, India, was held on 6 October at the Indira Gandhi Arena.

== Medalists ==
Gold	Efionayi Agbonavbare; Nigeria
Silver	Manoj Kumar; India
Bronze	Dean van Zyl; South Africa

=== Bracket ===
Preliminary
Dean van Zyl (RSA)	2	5	0
Steve Hill (NZL)	0	1	0

Quarterfinals
Efionayi Agbonavbare (NGR)	6	7	0
Faamau Afele (SAM)	0	0	0
Sean Keogh (SCO)	4	0	1
Gene Kapaufs (AUS)	0	5	2
Manoj Kumar (IND)	?	?
Muhammad Inam (PAK)	?	?
Mohamed Osman (ENG)	0	0	0
Dean van Zyl (RSA)	3	0	0

Semifinals
Efionayi Agbonavbare (NGR)	4	1	4
Gene Kapaufs (AUS)	0	1	0
Manoj Kumar (IND)	3	1	0
Dean van Zyl (RSA)	0	0	0

Final
Efionayi Agbonavbare (NGR)	4	0	3
Manoj Kumar (IND)	0	2	0

=== Repechage ===
Quarterfinals	Semifinals				Bronze Medal Bout
	Faamau Afele (SAM)	3	0	0
	Gene Kapaufs (AUS)	1	1	3
					Gene Kapaufs (AUS)	0	0	0
					Dean van Zyl (RSA)	3	1	0
	Muhammad Inam (PAK)	?	?	?
	Dean van Zyl (RSA)	?	?	?
