= Badminton at the 2010 Commonwealth Games – Women's doubles =

The Women's doubles event of badminton at the 2010 Commonwealth Games was held from 10 to 14 October 2010 in Siri Fort Sports Complex, New Delhi, India.

== Finals ==
Quarterfinals
1	Shinta Mulia Sari (SIN); Yao Lei (SIN)	21	17	21
Leanne Choo (AUS); Renuga Vithi (AUS)	18	21	17
3	Jenny Wallwork (ENG); Gabrielle White (ENG)	21	16	21
Lydia Cheah (MAS); Goh Liu Ying (MAS)	15	21	13
Tang He Tian (AUS); Kate Wilson (AUS)	21	21
4	Danielle Barry (NZL); Donna Haliday (NZL)	12	6
Mariana Agathangelou (ENG); Heather Olver (ENG)	9	14
2	Jwala Gutta (IND); Ashwini Ponnappa (IND)	21	21

Semifinals
1	Shinta Mulia Sari (SIN); Yao Lei (SIN)	21	21
3	Jenny Wallwork (ENG); Gabrielle White (ENG)	19	13
Tang He Tian (AUS); Kate Wilson (AUS)	21	13	11
2	Jwala Gutta (IND); Ashwini Ponnappa (IND)	12	21	21

Gold Medal Match
1	Shinta Mulia Sari (SIN); Yao Lei (SIN)	16	19
2	Jwala Gutta (IND); Ashwini Ponnappa (IND)	21	21
Bronze Medal Match
3	Jenny Wallwork (ENG); Gabrielle White (ENG)	23	12	16
Tang He Tian (AUS); Kate Wilson (AUS)	21	21	21
