= Wrestling at the 2010 Commonwealth Games – Men's Greco-Roman 96 kg =

Men's Greco-Roman 96 kg competition at the 2010 Commonwealth Games in New Delhi, India, was held on 5 October at the Indira Gandhi Arena.

Hassene Fkiri of Australia was ejected from the competition after being disqualified during the gold medal bout for making offensive gestures to and abusing officials in response to being cautioned for headbutting and slapping. Accordingly, South Africa's Kakoma Bella-Lufu received the silver medal and Canada's Eric Feunekes received the bronze.

== Medalists ==
Gold	Anil Kumar; India
Silver	Kakoma Bella-Lufu; South Africa
Bronze	Eric Feunekes; Canada

=== Bracket ===
Round of 32
Tiebana Mase (SOL)	4	0	0
Hassene Fkiri (AUS)	10	8	0

Round of 16
Mark Montgomery (NIR)	0	0	0
Anil Kumar (IND)	7	6	0
Kakoma Bella-Lufu (RSA)	2	5	0
Andreas Pieri (CYP)	0	0	0
Eric Feunekes (CAN)	4	0	3
Muhammed Umar (PAK)	0	1	0
Samuel Belkin (NZL)	1	0	0
Hassene Fkiri (AUS)	1	2	0

Quarterfinals
Anil Kumar (IND)	0	1	2
Kakoma Bella-Lufu (RSA)	1	0	0
Eric Feunekes (CAN)	0	0	0
Hassene Fkiri (AUS)	1	2	0

Semifinals
Anil Kumar (IND)	3	3	0
Hassene Fkiri (AUS)	0	0	0

=== Repechage ===
Repechage round 1
Tiebana Mase (SOL)	0	0
Samuel Belkin (NZL)	5	3

Repechage round 2
Mark Montgomery (NIR)	0	0
Kakoma Bella-Lufu (RSA)	8	6
Samuel Belkin (NZL)	0	0
Eric Feunekes (CAN)	5	0

Bronze medals
Kakoma Bella-Lufu (RSA)	1	1
Eric Feunekes (CAN)	0	0
Kakoma Bella-Lufu (RSA)	1	1
Eric Feunekes (CAN)	0	0
