= Powerlifting at the 2010 Commonwealth Games – Women's Open bench press =

The Women's Open bench press weightlifting event was an event at the weightlifting competition The whole competition took place on 12 October at 14:00. The weightlifter from Nigeria won the gold.

== Results ==
Rank	Name	Country	Group	B.weight (kg)	1	2	3	Total (kg)
1st place, gold medalist(s)	Esther Oyema	Nigeria	A	46.65	125.0	130.0	135.0	148.1
2nd place, silver medalist(s)	Ganiyatu Onaolapo	Nigeria	A	47.00	115.0	125.0	127.5	139.3
3rd place, bronze medalist(s)	Osamwenyobor Araspmwan	Nigeria	A	127.29	100.0	110.0	115.0	124.6
4	Zoe Newson	England	B	39.78	80.0	85.0	~~87.5~~	100.4
5	Deahnne McIntyre	Australia	A	117.47	127.5	132.5	~~137.5~~	98.5
6	Lee Siow	Malaysia	A	62.46	~~95.0~~	95.0	~~100.0~~	91.3
7	Sharifah Syek	Malaysia	A	81.30	~~102.5~~	102.5	~~107.5~~	88.1
8	Julie Salmon	Wales	B	48.39	77.5	~~82.5~~	~~82.5~~	83.6
9	Bharti Somkuwar	India	B	37.22	62.5	~~65.0~~	65.0	79.5
10	Roshani Rinke	India	B	39.33	57.5	~~60.0~~	~~60.0~~	68.4
11	Rajdeep Kaur	India	B	54.63	60.0	~~65.0~~	~~65.0~~	61.2
12	Regina Edward	Papua New Guinea	B	66.67	45.0	~~50.0~~	50.0	46.7

== See also ==
- 2010 Commonwealth Games
- Weightlifting at the 2010 Commonwealth Games
