= Wrestling at the 2010 Commonwealth Games – Women's freestyle 55 kg =

Women's freestyle 55 kg competition at the 2010 Commonwealth Games in New Delhi, India, was held on 7 October at the Indira Gandhi Arena.

== Medalists ==
Gold	Geeta Phogat; India
Silver	Emily Bensted; Australia
Bronze	Lovina Edward; Nigeria

=== Bracket ===
Quarterfinals
Emily Bensted (AUS)
BYE
Jayne Clason (SCO)
BYE
Lovina Edward (NGR)	0	1	2
Jill Gallays (CAN)	3	0	0
Non Evans (WAL)	0	0	0
Geeta Phogat (IND)	2	0	0

Semifinals
Emily Bensted (AUS)	3	2	0
Jayne Clason (SCO)	1	0	0
Lovina Edward (NGR)	1	0	0
Geeta Phogat (IND)	0	1	4

Finals
Emily Bensted (AUS)	0	0	0
Geeta Phogat (IND)	1	7	0

=== Repechage ===
Quarterfinals	Semifinals				Bronze Medal Bout
	BYE
	Jayne Clason (SCO)
					Jayne Clason (SCO)	0	0	0
					Lovina Edward (NGR)	3	5	0
	Non Evans (WAL)	0	0	0
	Lovina Edward (NGR)	6	3	0
