= Nigeria at the 2010 Commonwealth Games =

- CGF code: NGR
- CGA: Nigeria Olympic Committee
- Website: www.nigeriaolympiccommittee.org

in Delhi, India
- Flag bearers: Opening: Closing:
- Medals Ranked 9th: Gold 11 Silver 8 Bronze 14 Total 33

Commonwealth Games appearances (overview)
- 1950; 1954; 1958; 1962; 1966; 1970; 1974; 1978; 1982; 1986; 1990; 1994; 1998; 2002; 2006; 2010; 2014; 2018; 2022; 2026; 2030

Nigeria competed in the 2010 Commonwealth Games held in Delhi, India, from 3 to 14 October 2010.

== Medalists ==
Medal	Name	Sport	Event	Date
Gold	Augustina Nkem Nwaokolo	Weightlifting	Women's 48kg	4 October
Gold	Efionayi Agbonavbare	Wrestling	Men's 84kg	6 October
Gold	Obioma Agatha Okoli	Weightlifting	Women's 63kg	7 October
Gold	Ifeoma Christiana Nwoye	Wrestling	Women's 51kg	8 October
Gold	Hadiza Zakari	Weightlifting	Women's 75kg	9 October
Gold	Sinvie Boltic	Wrestling	Men's 96kg	9 October
Gold	Muizat Ajoke Odumosu	Athletics	Women's 400m Hurdles	10 October
Gold	Tosin Oke	Athletics	Men's triple jump	12 October
Gold	Esther Osa Oyema	Weightlifting	Women's Open bench press	12 October
Gold	Yakunu Adesokan	Weightlifting	Men's Open bench press	12 October
Gold	Kate Nwaka Oputa	Table tennis	Women's wheelchair open singles (TT1–5)	14 October
Silver	Onyeka Azike	Weightlifting	Women's 53kg	5 October
Silver	Talaram Mamman	Wrestling	Men's 120kg	6 October
Silver	Blessing Oborududu	Wrestling	Women's 63kg	7 October
Silver	Chineme Obeta	Athletics	Women's 1500 metres T54	7 October
Silver	Maryam Usman	Weightlifting	Women's +75kg	10 October
Silver	Ebikewenimo Welson	Wrestling	Men's 55kg	10 October
Silver	Ganiyatu Joy Onaolapo	Weightlifting	Women's Open bench press	12 October
Silver	Anthony Ulonnam	Weightlifting	Men's Open bench press	12 October
Bronze	Joseph Romeo	Wrestling	Men's 60kg	5 October
Bronze	Odunayo Fo Adekuroye	Wrestling	Women's 48kg	7 October
Bronze	Lovina Odohi Edward	Wrestling	Women's 55kg	7 October
Bronze	Hellen Okus	Wrestling	Women's 72kg	7 October
Bronze	Ayuba Abdullahi	Athletics	Para Sport – Men's 100m Para Sport T46	8 October
Bronze	Tega Tosin Richard	Wrestling	Women's 59kg	8 October
Bronze	Itohan Ebireguesele	Weightlifting	Women's 69kg	8 October
Bronze	Ifeoma Iheanacho	Wrestling	Women's 67kg	8 October
Bronze	Benedict Uloko	Weightlifting	Men's 94kg	9 October
Bronze	Curtis Onaghinor	Weightlifting	Men's 105kg	10 October
Bronze	Andrew Adibo Dick	Wrestling	Men's 84kg	10 October
Bronze	Osamwenyobor Arasomwan	Weightlifting	Women's Open bench press	12 October
Bronze	Ikechukwu Obichukwu	Weightlifting	Men's Open bench press	12 October
Bronze	Obiora Faith Chinenye	Table tennis	Women's wheelchair open singles (TT1–5)	14 October

== Medals By Sport ==
Medals by sport
Sport	gold	silver	bronze	Total
Aquatics	0	0	0	0
Wrestling	3	3	7	13
Cycling	0	0	0	0
Gymnastics	0	0	0	0
Weightlifting	5	4	5	14
Archery	0	0	0	0
Athletics	2	1	1	4
Badminton	0	0	0	0
Boxing	0	0	0	0
Hockey	0	0	0	0
Lawn bowls	0	0	0	0
Netball	0	0	0	0
Rugby sevens	0	0	0	0
Lawn bowls	0	0	0	0
Squash	0	0	0	0
Table tennis	1	0	1	2
Tennis	0	0	0	0
Total	11	8	14	33

== See also ==
- 2010 Commonwealth Games
