= Athletics at the 2010 Commonwealth Games – Men's triple jump =

Men's triple jump at the Commonwealth Games

The Men's triple jump at the 2010 Commonwealth Games as part of the athletics programme was held at the Jawaharlal Nehru Stadium on Tuesday 12 October 2010.

== Records ==
World Record	18.29	Jonathan Edwards	GBR	Gothenburg, Sweden	7 August 1995
Games Record	17.86	Jonathan Edwards	ENG	Manchester, England	2002

== Results ==
Rank	Athlete	1	2	3	4	5	6	Result	Notes
1st place, gold medalist(s)	Tosin Oke (NGR)	x	17.16	x	x	x	–	17.16	
2nd place, silver medalist(s)	Hugo Mamba-Schlick (CMR)	16.48	x	16.64	16.32	15.34	17.14	17.14	NR
3rd place, bronze medalist(s)	Renjith Maheswary (IND)	16.32	16.56	17.07	16.67	16.72	16.43	17.07	NR
4	Nathan Douglas (ENG)	16.82	16.96	x	16.63	16.95	16.86	16.96	
5	Wilbert Walker (JAM)	16.46	16.67	16.85	16.51	16.67	15.32	16.85	PB
6	Randy Lewis (GRN)	x	16.53	x	16.73	x	x	16.73	
7	Larry Achike (ENG)	16.59	x	x	16.55	x	x	16.59	
8	Zacharias Arnos (CYP)	15.81	16.12	x	x	15.67	x	16.12	
9	Amarjeet Singh (IND)	15.85	x	16.00				16.00	
10	Nicholas Thomas (JAM)	15.32	x	13.51				15.32	
11	Boitu Baiteke (KIR)	13.29	x	x				13.29	
–	Mong Tavol (PNG)	x	x	x					NM
–	Ayata Joseph (ANT)								DNS
