= Wrestling at the 2010 Commonwealth Games – Men's Greco-Roman 66 kg =

Men's Greco-Roman 66 kg competition at the 2010 Commonwealth Games in New Delhi, India, was held on 6 October at the Indira Gandhi Arena.

== Medalists ==
Gold	Myroslav Dykun; England
Silver	Jack Bond; Canada
Bronze	Sunil Kumar; India

=== Bracket ===
Quarterfinals
Muhammad Salman (PAK)	?	?
Cory Obrien (AUS)	?	?
Myroslav Dykun (ENG)	2	4	0
Sunil Kumar (IND)	0	0	0
Roshan Liyanage (SRI)	3	0	0
Jack Bond (CAN)	4	9	0
Brett Hawthorn (WAL)	2	3	0
Villiamu Fualau (SAM)	0	1	0

Semifinals
Cory Obrien (AUS)	0	0	0
Myroslav Dykun (ENG)	4	7	0
Jack Bond (CAN)	2	4	0
Brett Hawthorn (WAL)	0	1	0

Finals
Myroslav Dykun (ENG)	4	0	0
Jack Bond (CAN)	0	0	0

=== Repechage ===
Quarterfinals	Semifinals				Bronze Medal Bout
	Sunil Kumar (IND)	8	0	0
	Cory Obrien (AUS)	3	0	0
					Sunil Kumar (IND)	6	8	0
					Brett Hawthorn (WAL)	0	0	0
	Roshan Liyanage (SRI)	0	6	0
	Brett Hawthorn (WAL)	6	8	0
