= Gagandeep Kaur =

Indian archer

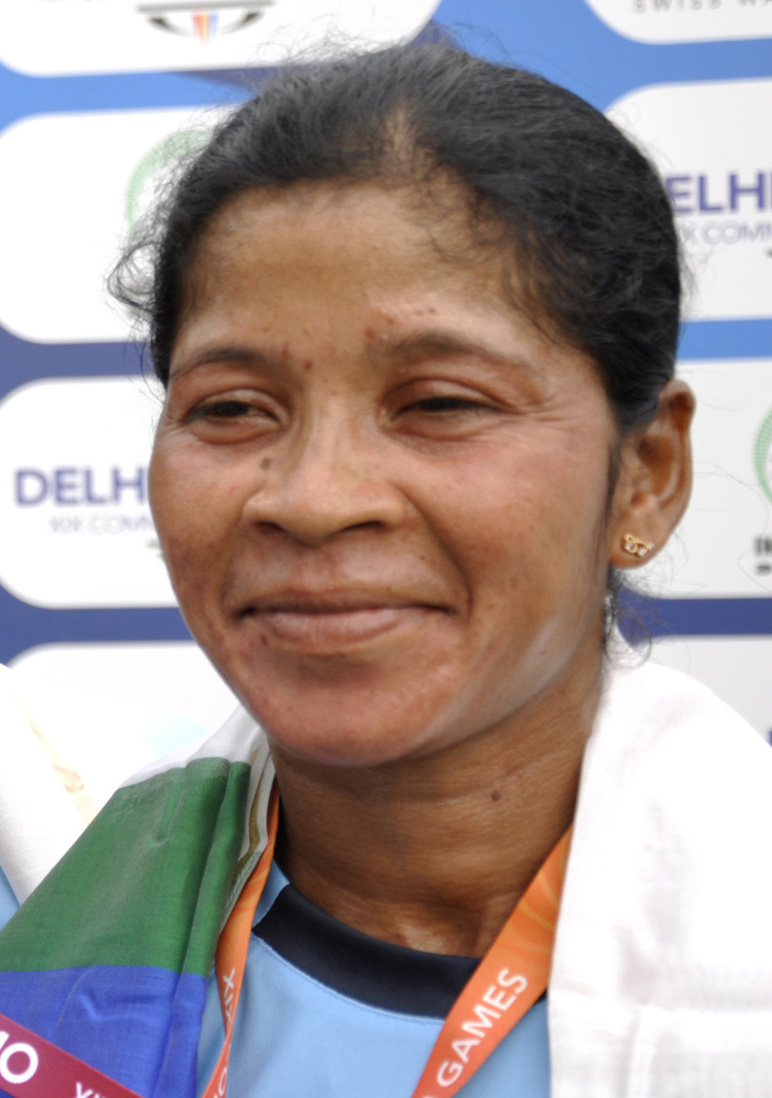

Personal information
- Citizenship: Indian
- Born: 1988 (age 37–38) Patiala, Punjab, India
Medal record
Women's archery
Representing India
Commonwealth Games
Bronze medal – third place	2010 Delhi	Compound team
Universiade
Bronze medal – third place	2011 Shenzhen	Compound team

Gagandeep Kaur (born 1988) is an Indian archer. She is the first archer from Punjab to win a medal in the Archery women's compound team with Jhano Hansdah and Bhagyabati Chanu, defeating Malaysia. For her unexpected performance, she was even awarded with Rs 2 lakh cash award from Punjab University in Patiala.
