= Manu Pal =

Indian lawn bowler

Personal information
- Full name: Manu Kumari Pal
- Nationality: India
- Citizenship: Indian
- Born: Kannauj, Uttar Pradesh, India
- Occupation: sportsperson

Sport
- Country: India
- Sport: Lawn bowls

Manu Pal is an Indian women's international lawn bowler.

== Bowls career ==
She won a gold medal in Lawn Bals at the 34th National Games of India in 2011. In 2019, she won gold in the Lawn Bals game at the Malaysian Open Triples. She won three bronze medal in the 7th National Champion Lawn Bals Competition in March 2019.

She won a silver and two bronze medal in the National Lawn Ball Championship, held in Ranchi, Jharkhand, in February 2017. He also participated in Commonwealth Games. Manu Pal has also represented Delhi's team, played from Ranchi's team.

== Personal life ==
She hails from Chhibramau, Kannauj district of Uttar Pradesh. Manu holds an MA, B.Ed. and a Diploma in Yoga. Her father, Ramnarayan Pal is retired from Central Reserve Police Force (CRPF) and her mother Haripyari Devi is housewife.

== Awards and recognition ==
Manu Pal was awarded the Yash Bharti Award, the highest civilian honour of the Government of Uttar Pradesh, in 2016 for her outstanding contribution to the field of sports. In January 2021, she was honored with the National Youth Icon Award by the Rashtriya Yuva Shakti Sangathan and the award was given by Akhilesh Yadav, the former Chief Minister of Uttar Pradesh.

In the Lok Sabha elections, Manu Pal was made brand ambassador by the Election Commission to motivate the youth for voting.
