= Mathew Masonwells =

Australian archer (born 1986)

Personal information
- Nationality: Australian
- Born: 26 June 1986 (age 40) Alexandra Hills, Queensland

Sport
- Country: Australia
- Sport: Archery
- Event: Men's recurve
Medal record
Archery
Representing Australia
Commonwealth Games
Gold medal – first place	2010 Delhi	Men's Team

Mathew Masonwells (born 26 June 1986) is an archer from Australia. Originally from Queensland, he has moved to the Australian Capital Territory. He started in archery when he was thirteen years old. He had a scholarship with the Australian Institute of Sport. He was named to the Australian archery shadow Olympic team for the 2012 Summer Olympics and participated in team training camps.

== Personal ==
Masonwells is from Alexandra Hills, Queensland. He moved to the Australian Capital Territory to live closer to Karina Wallace-Bourne, his girlfriend who is a teacher. In Brisbane, he finished a course as an apprentice carpenter. His parents are proud of his archery accomplishments.

== Archery ==
Masonwells started in the sport he was thirteen years old, "when his father made him a timber bow to take to a medieval fair and he couldn't resist continuing to use it at his grandparents' farm." Between shooting rounds, he likes to listen to the Australian band, Hilltop Hoods.

In 2002, he was part of the Australian team that competed at the World Junior Championships in the cadet male recurve event. In October 2009, Masonwells finished third at the Melbourne hosted Australian Open. At the invitation only competition, he was scouted by Simon Fairweather of the Australian Institute of Sport (AIS). Fairweather offered him a part-time scholarship at AIS which he accepted. He earned a full-time scholarship in March 2010.

As a twenty-four-year-old, he represented Australia at the 2010 Commonwealth Games. He competed in the men's recurve archery team event where he took home a gold medal with a team score of 219, defeating Malaysia who were ranked third in the world at the time and had an event score of 212. He also competed in the individual event on the final day of the competition. In the quarter-finals, he went up against Indian Rahul Banerjee. At the Games, he was coached by Simon Fairweather.

In September 2011, Masonwells was named to the Australian archery shadow Olympic team. He attended a national team training camp in Canberra in September 2011 and March 2012. At the 2012 National Target Archery Championships, he finished fifth as a member of SQAS. In March at the 2012 Olympic Games Nomination Shoot Results, he finished fifth with a score of 2571. In May 2012, he participated in a training camp in Buderim. He was invited to the camp because Sky Kim had other commitments and could not make it. As of May 2012, he had not qualified for the 2012 Summer Olympics. To make the Games, he needed to qualify at the World Cup event in Ogden, Utah.
