= Harwant Kaur =

Indian discus thrower and shot putter (born 1980)

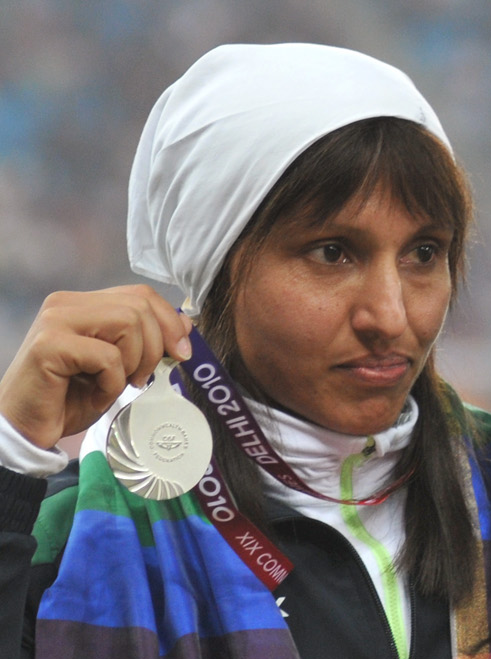
- Harwant Kaur at XIX Commonwealth Games-2010

Personal information
- Born: 5 July 1980 (age 46)
- Height: 1.68 m (5 ft 6 in)

Sport
- Country: India
- Sport: Athletics
- Events: Discus; Shot put
- Coached by: Parveer Singh

Achievements and titles
- Personal bests: Shot Put: 15.75 (Bangalore 2002); Discus Throw: 63.05 m (Kyiv 2004)
Medal record
Women's athletics
Representing India
Asian Championships
Silver medal – second place	2002 Colombo	Discus throw
Commonwealth Games
Silver medal – second place	2010 Delhi	Discus throw
- Updated on 10 July 2013

Harwant Kaur (born 5 July 1980) is an Indian discus thrower and shot putter. She won the silver medal at the 2002 Asian Championships, finished fourth at the 2003 Asian Championships and seventh at the 2006 Commonwealth Games. In addition she competed at the 2004 Olympic Games and was ranked 13th in the qualifying rounds. Her personal coach is Parveer Singh. At 2010 Commonwealth Games, she won the silver medal in the Discus throw event.

Her personal best throw is 63.05 metres, achieved in August 2004 in Kyiv. She contested at the 2008 Beijing Olympics, but failed to reach the finals, and was ranked 17th in the qualifiers with a throw of 56.42 m.

== See also ==
- Indian Squad for 2008 Olympics
