= Harpreet Singh (sport shooter) =

Indian sport shooter (born 1981)

Medal record

Representing India

Men's Pistol shooting

Commonwealth Games
Gold medal – first place	2010 Delhi	25m centre fire pistol (Pairs)
Gold medal – first place	2010 Delhi	25m centre fire pistol (Individual)
Silver medal – second place	2014 Glasgow	25m Rapid Fire Pistol (Individual)

Harpreet Singh is an Indian Shooter from Karnal Haryana.

== Career ==
In Commonwealth Games Delhi, Harpreet won 2 gold medals for India.

=== International representation ===
Year	Event	Venue
2006	ISSF World Cup	Guangjao (China)
2006	ISSF World Cup	Resende (Brazil)
2007	11TH Asian shooting championship	Kuwait
2010	ISSF World Championship	Munich
2010	Asian games	Guangjao (China)
2012	ISSF World Cup	Milan (Italy)
2012	ISSF World Cup	Munich
2013	ISSF World Cup	S. Korea
2013	ISSF World Cup	Atlanta (US)
2013	ISSF World Cup	Munich
2014	ISSF World Cup	Munich
2014	ISSF World Cup	Maribor
2014	ISSF WORLD CHAMPIONSHIP	Spain
2014	ASIAN GAMES	S. Korea
2015	ISSF World Cup	Munich
2016	ISSF World Cup	Munich
2017	ISSF World Cup	New Delhi
2017	ISSF World Cup	Munich

== Achievements ==
=== All India police competition ===
year	event	venue	gold	silver	bronze
JAN 18	11th AIPSSC	INDORE	2	2	-

WON BEST SHOOTER TROPHY FOR SHOOTING A NEW MEET RECORD AND WINNING 02 GOLD 02 SILVER MEDALS IN 11TH AIPSSC JAN 2018

=== International ===
year	event	venue	gold	silver	bronze
MAY 17	48th Grand Prix	Pilzen	-	2	1
MAY 15	46th Grand Prix	Czech Republic	1	-	1
JULY 14	20TH CWG	Scotland	-	1	-
OCT 13	6TH Asian Air Gun Championship	Tehran, Iran	-	1	-
JULY 2011	WORLD MILITARY GAMES	RIO D JANERIO, Brazil	-	-	1
OCT 2010	19TH COMMON WEALTH GAMES	NEW DELHI	2	-	-
FEB 2010	SOUTH ASIAN GAMES	DHAKA, BANGLADESH	1	1	-
SEP 2006	SOUTH ASIAN GAMES	COLOMBO, SRI LANKA	-	1	-

=== National ===
year	event	venue	gold	silver	bronze
2003	47TH NSCC	HYDERABAD	-	2	1
2004	48TH NSCC	INDORE	-	2	1
2005	49TH NSCC	HYDERABAD	1	-	2
2006	7TH KSSM	DELHI	-	-	2
2006	50TH NSCC	INDORE	1	3	-
2007	8TH KSSM	DELHI	2	2	-
2007	51ST NSCC	AHAMEDABAD	-	2	-
2008	9TH KSSM	INDORE	-	2	1
2009	52ND NSCC	THODUPUZHA	-	2	-
2009	10TH KSSM	PUNE	1	3	-
2009	7TH MASTERS MEET	INDORE	-	1	-
2009	53RD NSCC	JALANDHAR	1	3	-
2011	54th NSCC	NEW DELHI	1	2	1
2011	National Games	RANCHI	1	3	-
2012	55th NSCC	PUNE	1	2	2
2013	56th NSCC	NEW DELHI	-	5	-
2013	57th NSCC	NEW DELHI	-	2	1
2014	58th NSCC	PUNE	1	-	-
2015	National Games	Kerala	-	2	1
2015	KSS	Kerala	2	-	-
2015	59th NSCC	NEW DELHI	2	-	3
2016	60th NSCC	NEW DELHI	-	1	1
2017	KSSS Championship	New Delhi	-	2	-
2017	60th NSCC	TRIVENDRUM	2	1	1
