= Norfolk Island at the 2010 Commonwealth Games =

- CG code: NFI
- CGA: Norfolk Island Amateur Sports and Commonwealth Games Association
- Website: oceaniasport.com/

in Delhi, India
- Competitors: 22
- Flag bearers: Opening: Duncan Gray; Closing: Michael Graham
- Medals: Gold 0 Silver 0 Bronze 0 Total 0

Commonwealth Games appearances (overview)
- 1986; 1990; 1994; 1998; 2002; 2006; 2010; 2014; 2018; 2022; 2026; 2030

Norfolk Island competed in the 2010 Commonwealth Games held in Delhi, India, from 3 to 14 October 2010.

== Team Norfolk Island at the 2010 Commonwealth Games ==
The team consisted of 13 men and 9 women; 9 competed in bowls, 5 in archery, and 4 each in squash and shooting.

== Archery ==
Team Norfolk Island consists of 5 archers.

Rosa Ford, Bob Kemp, Michael Graham, Jonno Snell, Jo Snell

They competed in the

- Men's Compound Individual
- Men's Compound Team
- Women's Compound Individual

== Lawn Bowls ==
Team Norfolk Island consists of 9 lawn bowls players.

Carmen Anderson, Kitha Bailey, John Christian, Petal Hore, Margaret O'Brien, Anne Pledger, Esther Sanchez, Timothy Sheridan, Barry Wilson

They competed in the

- Men's Triples
- Women's Singles
- Women's Pairs
- Women's Triples

== Shooting ==
Team Norfolk Island consists of 4 shooters.

Graham Cock, Graham Lock, Denise Reeves, Stephen Ryan

They competed in the

- Men's Singles 10m Air Pistol
- Men's Pairs 10m Air Pistol
- Men's Singles 25m Standard Pistol
- Men's Pairs 25m Standard Pistol
- Men's Singles 25m Centrefire Pistol
- Men's Pairs 25m Centrefire Pistol
- Women's Singles 10m Air Pistol
- Women's Singles 25m Pisol

== Squash ==
Team Norfolk Island consists of 4 squash players

Peter Christian-Bailey, Gye Duncan, Duncan Gray, Mal Rundell

They competed in the

- Men's Doubles
