= Jhano Hansdah =

Indian compound archer

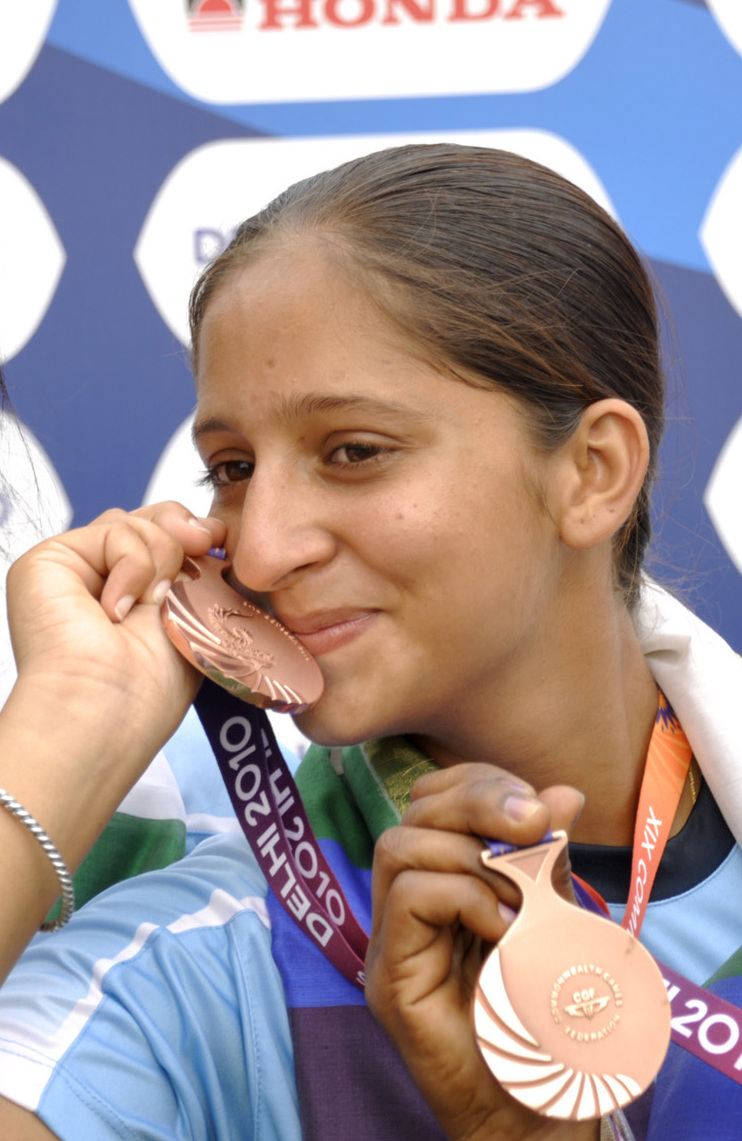

Personal information
- National team: 2013
- Born: 24 October 1975 (age 50)

Sport
- Country: India
- Sport: Archery
- Event: Compound
Medal record
Women's compound archery
Representing India
Asian Championships
Gold medal – first place	2005 New Delhi	Individual
Silver medal – second place	2007 Xi'an	Team
Silver medal – second place	2009 Denpasar	Team
Bronze medal – third place	2007 Xi'an	Individual
Bronze medal – third place	2011 Tehran	Team

Jhano Hansdah (born 24 October 1975) is an Indian female compound archer and part of the national team. She competed at the 2013 World Archery Championships.
