= South Africa at the 2010 Commonwealth Games =

- CGF code: RSA
- CGA: South African Sports Confederation and Olympic Committee
- Website: sascoc.co.za

in Delhi, India
- Flag bearers: Opening: Cameron van der Burgh; Closing:
- Medals Ranked 5th: Gold 12 Silver 11 Bronze 10 Total 33

Commonwealth Games appearances (overview)
- 1930; 1934; 1938; 1950; 1954; 1958; 1962–1990; 1994; 1998; 2002; 2006; 2010; 2014; 2018; 2022; 2026; 2030

South Africa competed in the 2010 Commonwealth Games held in Delhi, India, from 3 to 14 October 2010.

This was the fifth occasion that South Africa has been represented at the Commonwealth Games since re-joining the Commonwealth in 1994 after a break of 33 years during the international sports isolation period.

== Medalists ==
Medal	Name	Sport	Event	Date
Gold	Chad le Clos	Aquatics	Men's 200 m butterfly	October 4
Gold	Natalie du Toit	Aquatics	Women's 50 m freestyle S9	October 5
Gold	Cameron van der Burgh	Aquatics	Men's 100 m breaststroke	October 6
Gold	Natalie du Toit	Aquatics	Women's 100 m freestyle S9	October 7
Gold	Chad le Clos	Aquatics	Men's 400 m individual medley	October 7
Gold	Cameron van der Burgh	Aquatics	Men's 50 m breaststroke	October 8
Gold	Chris Harmse	Athletics	Men's hammer throw	October 8
Gold	Natalie du Toit	Aquatics	Women's 100 metre butterfly S9	October 9
Gold	Sunette Viljoen	Athletics	Women's javelin	October 9
Gold	Tracy-Lee Botha; Susan Nel; Santjie Steyn	Lawn bowls	Women's triples	October 10
Gold	Johann Pierre du Plessis; Wayne Perry; Gidion Vermeulen	Lawn bowls	Men's triples	October 10
Gold	Shaun Addinall; Gerry Baker	Lawn bowls	Men's pairs	October 11
Silver	Richard Brian Addinall	Wrestling	Men's 74 kg	October 5
Silver	Kakoma Hugues Bella-Lufu	Wrestling	Men's 96 kg	October 5
Silver	Wendy Trott	Aquatics	Women's 800 m freestyle	October 7
Silver	Jennifer Mbali Khwela	Gymnastics	Women's vault	October 7
Silver	Samkelo Radebe	Athletics	Men's 100 metres T46	October 7
Silver	Roland Schoeman	Aquatics	Men's 50 m freestyle	October 9
Silver	Heerden Herman	Aquatics	Men's 1500 m freestyle	October 9
Silver	Richard Brian Addinall	Wrestling	Men's 74 kg	October 9
Silver	Charl Crous; Cameron van der Burgh; Chad le Clos; Gideon Louw	Aquatics	Men's 4 x 100 m medley	October 9
Silver	Heinrich Barnes	Wrestling	Men's 66 kg	October 10
Silver	L. J. van Zyl	Athletics	Men's 400 m hurdles	October 10
Bronze	Gideon Louw; Graeme Moore; Roland Schoeman; Darian Townsend	Aquatics	Men's 4 × 100 m freestyle	October 4
Bronze	Dean van Zyl	Wrestling	Men's 55 kg	October 6
Bronze	Roland Schoeman	Aquatics	Men's 50 m butterfly	October 6
Bronze	Jean Basson; Darian Townsend; Jan Venter; Chad le Clos	Aquatics	Men's 4 x 200 m freestyle	October 6
Bronze	Riaan Schoeman	Aquatics	Men's 400 m individual medley	October 7
Bronze	Nico Benade, Septimus Cilliers and Jacobus de Wet	Archery	Men's compound team	October 7
Bronze	Gideon Louw	Aquatics	Men's 50 m freestyle	October 9
Bronze	Septimus Cilliers	Archery	Men's compound individual	October 9
Bronze	Justine Robbeson	Athletics	Women's javelin	October 9
Bronze	Tera Mtembu; Cecil Afrika; Ockert Kruger; Renfred Dazel; Rayno Benjamin; Paul Delport; Bernado Botha; Chase Minnaar; Boom Prinsloo; Neil Powell; S'bura Sithole and MJ Mentz	Rugby sevens	Men's Sevens Rugby	October 12

Medals by sport
Sport	gold	silver	bronze	Total
Aquatics	7	4	5	16
Wrestling	0	4	1	5
Cycling	0	0	0	0
Gymnastics	0	1	0	1
Weightlifting	0	0	0	0
Archery	0	0	2	2
Athletics	2	2	1	5
Badminton	0	0	0	0
Boxing	0	0	0	0
Hockey	0	0	0	0
Lawn bowls	3	0	0	3
Netball	0	0	0	0
Rugby sevens	0	0	1	1
Shooting	0	0	0	0
Squash	0	0	0	0
Table tennis	0	0	0	0
Tennis	0	0	0	0
Total	12	11	10	33

== Aquatics ==
Aquatics:

- Wendy Trott
- Heerden Herman
- Chad le Clos
- Gideon Louw
- Mark Randall
- Roland Schoeman
- Riaan Schoeman
- Darian Townsend
- Cameron van der Burgh

Para Swim:

- Natalie du Toit

== Archery ==
- Jorina Coetzee
- Jacobus de Wet
- Septimus Cilliers
- Nico Benade

== Boxing ==
- Papish Baloyi
- Siphiwe Lusizi
- Masana Manganyi
- Lebogang Pilane

== Cycling ==
- Robyn de Groot
- Ashleigh Moolman
- Anriette Schoeman
- Carla Swart
- Cherise Taylor
- Marissa van der Merwe
- Dean Edwards
- Robert Hunter
- Daryl Impey
- Darren Lill
- Jay Thompson
- Christoff van Heerden
- Jaco Venter

== Gymnastics ==
=== Artistic ===
Women

- Sibongile Mjekula
- Jennifer Khwela
- Ashleigh Heldsinger

== Hockey ==
=== Men ===
- Brendan Botes
- Gareth Carr
- Tim Drummond
- Ian Haley
- Rhett Halkett
- Thomas Hammond
- Marvin Harper
- Julian Hykes
- Lance Louw
- Lloyd Madsen
- Wade Paton
- Lloyd Norris-Jones
- Taine Paton
- Justin Reid-Ross
- Austin Smith

=== Women ===
- Tarryn Bright
- Dirkie Chamberlain
- Lisa-Marie Deetliefs
- Farah Fredericks
- Lesle-Ann George
- Kim Hubach
- Marcelle Keet
- Kelly Madsen
- Vuyisanani Mangisa
- Marsha Marescia
- Mariette Rix
- Lenise Marais
- Kathleen Taylor
- Nicolene Terblanche
- Roxanne Turner
- Jennifer Wilson

== Lawn Bowls ==
- Tracy-Lee Botha
- Helen Grundlingh
- Susan Nel
- Colleen Piketh
- Brunhilda Roussouw
- Santjie Steyn
- Shaun Addinall
- Gerry Baker
- Bobby Donnelly
- Johann Pierre du Plessis
- Wayne Perry
- Gidion Vermeulen

Manager: Ron Weddell Coach: Theuns Fraser Coach: Jessica Henderson

== Netball ==
Chrisna Bootha, Erin Burger, Zukelwa Cwaba, Sindisiwe Gumede, Maryka Holtzhausen, Christene Markgraaf, Zanele Mdodane, Nthabiseng Moabi, Precious Mthembu, Amanda Mynhardt, Liezel Wium, Leigh-Ann Zackey. Manager: Marchelle Maroun. Coach: Carin Strauss. Assistant coach: Cecilia Molokwane

== Shooting ==
Tielman Breedt, Martin Davis, Petrus Haasbroek. Coaches: Jacob de Beer and Robert Thompson

== Table tennis ==
Luke Abrahams, Theo Cogill, Kurt Lingeveldt, Itumeleng Molahloe, Shane Overmeyer. Manager/coach: Sameera Maal. Coach: Marcus Gustafsson

Wheelchair Table Tennis: Aletta Moll

== Weightlifting ==
Babalwa Ndleleni, Mona Pretorius, Portia Vries. Manager/coach: Aveenash Pandoo

== Wrestling ==
Sonja Coetzee, Brumilda Leeuw, Mpho Madi, Zumicke Geringer, Richard Addinall, Heinrich Barnes, Bella-Lufa Hughes, Marius Loots, Gerald Meyer, Andries Schutte, Etienne van Huyssteen, Carlo van Wyk, Dean van Zyl. Manager: Sakkie Bosse. Coach: Nico Coetzee

Medical team Doctors Chief Medical Officer: Shuiab Manjra. Doctors: Demitri Constantinou, Jo-Anne Kirby

Physiotherapists Chief Physiotherapist: Caren Fleishman. Physiotherapists: Megan Dutton, Tamlyn Guest, Grace Hughes, Fikile Phasha, Tanushree Pillay, Sandhya Silal, Edwin Bodha, Nhlanhla Maphanga, David van Wyk

== See also ==
- 2010 Commonwealth Games
