= Pakistan at the 2010 Commonwealth Games =

- CG code: PAK
- CGA: Pakistan Olympic Association
- Website: nocpakistan.org

in Delhi, India
- Competitors: 54
- Flag bearers: Opening:Mohammad Ali Shah (Chef-de-Mission); Closing:
- Medals Ranked 17th: Gold 2 Silver 1 Bronze 2 Total 5

Commonwealth Games appearances (overview)
- 1954; 1958; 1962; 1966; 1970; 1974–1986; 1990; 1994; 1998; 2002; 2006; 2010; 2014; 2018; 2022; 2026; 2030

Pakistan competed at the 2010 Commonwealth Games held in Delhi, India, from 3 to 14 October 2010.

== Medalist ==
| Medal | Name | Sport | Discipline | Date |
|---|---|---|---|---|
| Gold | Azhar Hussain | Wrestling | Men's 55 kg | 10 October |
| Gold | Muhammad Inam | Wrestling | Men's 84 kg | 10 October |
| Silver | Azhar Hussain | Wrestling | Men's 55 kg | 6 October |
| Bronze | Muhammad Waseem | Boxing | Light flyweight | 11 October |
| Bronze | Haroon Shahid Iqbal Khan | Boxing | Flyweight | 11 October |

== Opening ceremony flag controversy ==
The flag bearer for Pakistan at the opening ceremony was scheduled to be weight-lifter Shujauddin Malik but as the teams entered the stadium the chef de mission, Dr. Mohammad Ali Shah insisted on carrying the flag himself. Pakistan weightlifting manager Rashid Mehmood said the team had considered a boycott in protest at the actions of the official but later withdrew their threat after Pakistan Olympic Association chief, Arif Hasan, assured them Shah would be sanctioned for his actions.

== Athletics ==
Pakistan sent 2 para athletes.

=== Para-Sport - Men ===
| Competitor(s) | Event | Time | Rank |
|---|---|---|---|
| Raheel Anwar | 100m | 12.68 | 6 (heat 1) |
| Asghar Ali | 100m | 12.69 | 7 (heat 3) |

== Boxing ==
Pakistan sent 6 Boxers to 2010 Commonwealth Games. In the team is also the boxer Amir Khan's brother Haroon Khan who is a British Pakistani and was offered to represent the country on behalf of his dual nationality.

=== Men ===
| Competitor(s) | Event | Qualification bout | Opponent | 1/8 Elimination bout | Opponent | 1/4 Elimination bout | Opponent | Semifinals bout | Opponent | Rank |
|---|---|---|---|---|---|---|---|---|---|---|
| Muhammad Waseem | Lightflyweight (49 kg) | -- | | 11-5 | (Sri Lanka) Chaminda Tennakoon | | (Ghana) Duke Micah | | (Namibia) Japhet Uutoni | Bronze medal |
| Haroon Shahid Iqbal Khan | Flyweight (52 kg) | RSCH R3 | (Tanzania) Sunday Elias | 8-5 | (Mauritius) Gilbert Bactoria | +3-3 | (Wales) Andrew Selby | | (India) Suranjoy Mayengbam | Bronze medal |
| Qadir Khan | Bantamweight (56 kg) | 0-7 | (India) Akhil Kumar | -- | | -- | | -- | | |
| Nawaz Dad Khan | Lightweight (60 kg) | 1-11 | (Nigeria) Waheed Sogbamu | -- | | -- | | -- | | |
| Nisar Khan | Middleweight (75 kg) | RSCH R1 | (Papua New Guinea) Peter Michael | 13-1 | (Seychelles) Jovette Jean | 2-5 | (Wales) Keiran Harding | -- | | |
| Mir Wais Khan | Super Heavyweight (91 kg+) | -- | | 1-10 | (Trinidad and Tobago) Tariq Abdul Haqq | -- | | -- | | |

=== Officials ===
- Manager: Maj Nasir Ejaz Tung
- Coaches: Francisco Herandez Roldan and Ejaz Mehmood

== Field Hockey ==
=== Men ===
Pakistan has been drawn into Group A with Australia, India, Malaysia and Scotland. The following is a list of players and officials:

Players

1. Zeeshan Ashraf (captain)
2. Mohammad Imran
3. Mohammad Irfan
4. Waseem Ahmed
5. Mohammad Rashid
6. Fareed Ahmad
7. Shafqat Rasool
8. Rehan Butt
9. Shakeel Abbasi
10. Abdul Haseem Khan
11. Muhammad Waqas Sharif
12. Mohammad Rizwan
13. Mohammad Umar Bhutta
14. Imran Shah (goal keeper)
15. Muhammad Tauseeq
16. Muhammad Kashif Javed

Officials

- Khawaja Muhammad Junaid (manager)
- Michel van den Heuvel (coach)
- Ahmad Alam and Ajmal Khan Lodhi (assistant coaches)
- Faizur Rehman (physio)
- Nadeem Khan Lodhi (video analyst)

==== Pool A ====
| Team | Pts | Pld | W | D | L | GF | GA | GD |
|---|---|---|---|---|---|---|---|---|
| Australia | 12 | 4 | 4 | 0 | 0 | 15 | 2 | +13 |
| India | 9 | 4 | 3 | 0 | 1 | 16 | 11 | +5 |
| Pakistan | 6 | 4 | 2 | 0 | 2 | 11 | 9 | +2 |
| Malaysia | 3 | 4 | 1 | 0 | 3 | 5 | 14 | –9 |
| Scotland | 0 | 4 | 0 | 0 | 4 | 0 | 18 | –18 |

5 October 2010
10:30 (IST)
10:00 (PST)

| Pakistan | 3–0 | Scotland |
|---|---|---|
| Shakeel Abbasi 20'; Rehan Butt 25'; Muhammad Imran 43' | Report |

Umpires:
Nathan Stagno (GIB)
Peter Wright (RSA)

6 October 2010
20:30 (IST)
20:00 (PST)

| Pakistan | 4–1 | Malaysia |
|---|---|---|
| Muhammad Imran 17'; Shakeel Abbasi 38'; Rehan Butt 43'; Muhammad Waqas 65' | Report | Rahim 32' |

Umpires:
Peter Wright (RSA)
Gareth Greenfield (NZL)

9 October 2010
10:30 (IST)
10:00 (PST)

| Pakistan | 0–1 | Australia |
|---|---|---|
| | Report | Ciriello 33' |

Umpires:
Richmond Attipoe (GHA)
Martin Madden (SCO)

10 October 2010
19:00

| Pakistan | 4 - 7 | India |
|---|---|---|
| Muhammad Imran 27'; Muhammad Rizwan 29'; Muhammad Irfan 58'; Shakeel Abbasi 68' | Report | Sandeep Singh 3' 11'; Shivendra Singh 19' 59'; Saravanjit Singh 20'; Danish Mujtaba 41'; Dharamvir Singh 45' |

Umpires:
Tim Pullman (AUS)
Nathan Stagno (GIB)

===== Fifth and sixth place =====
12 October 2010
13:30

| Pakistan | 2–3 (a.e.t.) | South Africa |
|---|---|---|
| Rehan Butt 28' 53' | Report | Justin Reid-Ross 55' 75'; Gareth Carr 62' |

Umpires:
Andrew Kennedy (ENG)
Gareth Greenfield (NZL)

=== Goal Scorers ===
| Player | Pld | Goals |
|---|---|---|
| Muhammad Imran | 3 | 2 |
| Shakeel Abbasi | 3 | 2 |
| Rehan Butt | 3 | 2 |
| Muhammad Waqas | 3 | 1 |

== Shooting ==
Pakistan will send 6 male shooters and 1 female shooter to 2010 Commonwealth Games.

=== Pistol - Men ===
| Competitor(s) | Event | Average | Total Points | Rank |
|---|---|---|---|---|
| Irshad Ali | 50m Singles | - | 519 | 17 |
| Kalimullah Khan | 50m Singles | - | 634.2 | 6 |
| Irshad Ali; Kalimullah Khan | 50m Pairs | 8.900 | 1068 | 6 |
| Irshad Ali | 10m Air Pistol Singles | - | 550-7x | 19 |
| Kalimullah Khan | 10m Air Pistol Singles | - | 667 | 8 |
| Irshad Ali; Kalimullah Khan | 10m Air Pistol Pairs | - | 1111-18x | 10 |
| Irshad Ali | 25m Centrefire Pistol Singles | - | - | - |
| Mustaqeem Shah | 25m Centrefire Pistol Singles | - | - | - |
| Irshad Ali; Mustaqeem Shah | 25m Centrefire Pistol Pairs | - | - | - |
| Irshad Ali | 25m Standard Pistol Singles | - | - | - |
| Mustaqeem Shah | 25m Standard Pistol Singles | - | - | - |
| Irshad Ali; Mustaqeem Shah | 25m Standard Pistol Pairs | - | - | - |
| Mustaqeem Shah | 25m Rapid Fire Pistol Singles | - | - | - |

=== Pistol - Women ===
| Competitor(s) | Event | Average | Points | Rank |
|---|---|---|---|---|
| Tazeem Akhtar Abbasi | 25m Singles | 9.250 | 555 | 11 |
| Tazeem Akhtar Abbasi | 10m Air Pistol Singles | - | 369-8x | 13 |

=== Clay Target - Men ===
| Competitor(s) | Event | Points | Rank |
|---|---|---|---|
| Ahmed Sultan | Skeet Singles | - | - |
| Amin Karamat | Skeet Singles | - | - |
| Ahmed Sultan | Skeet Doubles | - | - |
| Amin Karamat | Skeet Doubles | - | - |
| Aamer Iqbal | Trap Singles | 105 | 32 |
| Aamer Iqbal | Double Trap Singles | - | - |

=== Officials ===
- Coach: Razi Ahmed Khan

== Squash ==
Pakistan sent 4 males squash players to 2010 Commonwealth Games.

=== Men ===
==== Singles ====
| Competitor(s) | Event | First Round | Opponent | Round of 32 | Opponent | Round of 16 | Opponent |
|---|---|---|---|---|---|---|---|
| Aamir Atlas Khan | Singles | 11-2, 11-2, 11-6 | (Bangladesh) M. Masud Rana | 11-2, 11-4, 11-2 | (Trinidad and Tobago) Colin Ramasra | 12-10, 3-11, 5-11, 5-11 | (England) Nick Matthew |
| Danish Atlas Khan | Singles | 11-1, 11-5, 11-2 | (Jamaica) Bruce Barrows | 5-11, 4-11, 3-11 | (England) Daryl Selby | -- | |
| Yasir Butt | Singles | w/o | (Jamaica) Christopher Binnie | 4-11, 3-11, 1-11 | (Pakistan) Farhan Mehboob | -- | |
| Farhan Mehboob | Singles | 11-3, 11-4, 11-8 | (Uganda) Samuel Kyagulanyi | 11-4, 11-3, 11-1 | (Pakistan) Yasir Butt | 9-11, 6-11, 8-11 | (Australia) Stewart Boswell |

==== Doubles ====
| Competitor(s) | Event | First match | Opponent | Second match | Opponent | Round of 16 | Opponent |
|---|---|---|---|---|---|---|---|
| Aamer Atlas Khan; Farhan Mehboob | Doubles | 7-11, 11-10, 3-11 | (New Zealand) Campbell Grayson (New Zealand) Martin Knight | 11-1, 11-4 | (Uganda) Samuel Kyagulanyi (Uganda) Brian Okumu | 4-11, 5-11 | (Australia) Stewart Boswell (Australia) David Palmer |
| Danish Atlas Khan; Yasir Butt | Doubles | 8-11, 3-11 | (Scotland) Alan Clyne (Scotland) Harry Leitch | 11-5, 11-8 | (Malawi) James Matewere (Malawi) Julius Taulo | 6-11, 8-11 | (England) Daryl Selby (England) Peter Barker |

=== Official ===
- Malik Amjad Ali Noon

== Tennis ==
Pakistan sent 2 tennis players to 2010 Commonwealth Games, one of whom is the recently successful US Open doubles runner-up Aisam-ul-Haq Qureshi.

=== Men ===
| Competitor(s) | Event | First Round | Opponent | Second round | Opponent |
|---|---|---|---|---|---|
| Aisam-ul-Haq Qureshi | Singles | 6-2, 7-6 | (Uganda) Duncan Mugabe | 4-6, 5-7 | (Australia) Matt Ebden |
| Aqeel Khan | Singles | 2-6, 6-7 | (England) Ross Hutchins | -- | |
| Aisam-ul-Haq Qureshi; Aqeel Khan | Doubles | 6-7, 4-6 | (Australia) P Hanley (Australia) P Luczak | -- | |

=== Officials ===
- Coach: Mohammad Khalid

== Weightlifting ==
Pakistan sent 6 weightlifters and 1 para athlete to 2010 Commonwealth Games.

=== Men ===
| Athlete | Event | Weights Lifted | | Total Lifted | Rank |
| Athlete | Event | Snatch | Clean & Jerk | Total Lifted | Rank |
|---|---|---|---|---|---|
| Abdullah Ghafoor | 56 kg | 104 | 133 | 237 | 4 |
| Muhammad Ishtiaq Ghafoor | 62 kg | 115 | 145 | 260 | 7 |
| Mati - ur - Rehman | 69 kg | 126 | 157 | 283 | 5 |
| Khurram Shahzad | 85 kg | 140 | 166 | 306 | 7 |
| Shujauddin Malik | 94 kg | - | - | - | DNF |
| Sajjad Amin Malik | 105 kg | - | - | - | 7 |

=== Para-Sport Powerlifting Men ===
| Competitor(s) | Event | Total pressed | Rank |
|---|---|---|---|
| Nasir Butt | Open Bench Press | | |

=== Officials ===
- Coach: Muhammad Ilyas Butt
- Manager: Rashid Mahmood

== Wrestling ==
Pakistan sent 6 wrestlers to the Games.

=== Freestyle - Men ===
| Competitor(s) | Event | Qualification | Opponent | Quarterfinals | Opponent | Repechage | Opponent | Bronze match | Opponent | Semi-finals | Opponent | Finals | Opponent | Rank |
|---|---|---|---|---|---|---|---|---|---|---|---|---|---|---|
| Azhar Hussain | 55 kg | Victory by fall | (Canada) Promise Mwenga | | (India) Anil Kumar | -- | | -- | | Victory by fall | (Sri Lanka) S. Manel Kumara Yaparathna Mudeyansellage vs | Victory by fall | (Nigeria) Ebikewenimo Welson | Gold medal |
| Sarmad Afaq | 60 kg | -- | | 1-3 | (Scotland) Viorel Etko | -- | | -- | | -- | | -- | | |
| Muhammad Salman | 66 kg | 3-0 | (Sri Lanka) Roshan Indika Liyanage | | (India) Sushil Kumar | | (Australia) Mehrdad Tarash | 1-3 | (Canada) Chris Prickett | -- | | -- | | |
| Muhammad Ali | 74 kg | -- | | 0-3 | (South Africa) Richard Brian Addinall | | (The Gambia) Bakary Jarju | Lost "by fall" | (Canada) Evan MacDonald | -- | | -- | | |
| Muhammad Inam | 84 kg | -- | | Greater superiority | (Kenya) Elvis Nato Simiyu Malaba | -- | | -- | | 3-1 | (South Africa) Gerald Waldemar Meyer | 3-1 | (India) Anuj Kumar | Gold medal |
| Muhammad Umar | 96 kg | -- | | 0-3 | (Canada) Korey Jarvis | | (Australia) Bilal Abdo | 1-3 | (England) Leon Gregory Rattigan | -- | | -- | | |

=== Greco-Roman - Men ===
| Competitor(s) | Event | Qualification | Opponent | Repechage | Opponent | Quarterfinals | Opponent | Semi-finals | Opponent | Finals | Opponent | Rank |
|---|---|---|---|---|---|---|---|---|---|---|---|---|
| Azhar Hussain | 55 kg | -- | | -- | | 15-3 | (Australia) Shane Parker | 9-2 | (Nigeria) Sunday Sanni | 0-11 | (India) Rajender Kumar | Silver medal |
| Sarmad Afaq | 60 kg | 1-13 | (England) Terence Christopher Bosson | 0-9 | (South Africa) Marius Loots | -- | | -- | | -- | | |
| Muhammad Salman | 66 kg | 0-5 | (Australia) Cory O'Brien | -- | | -- | | -- | | -- | | |
| Muhammad Ali | 74 kg | 0-5 | (South Africa) Richard Brian Addinall | -- | | -- | | -- | | -- | | |
| Muhammad Inam | 84 kg | | (India) Manoj Kumar | -- | | -- | | -- | | -- | | |
| Muhammad Umar | 96 kg | -- | | -- | | 1-7 | (Canada) Eric Feunekes | -- | | -- | | |

=== Officials ===
- Manager: Chaudhry Mohammad Asghar
- Head coach: Ghulam Raza Moazen
- Coach: Mohammad Anwar

== See also ==
- 2010 Commonwealth Games
