= Pakistan at the Commonwealth Games =

- CG code: PAK
- CGA: Pakistan Olympic Association
- Website: nocpakistan.org
- Medals Ranked 15th: Gold 27 Silver 27 Bronze 29 Total 83

Commonwealth Games appearances (overview)
- 1954; 1958; 1962; 1966; 1970; 1974–1986; 1990; 1994; 1998; 2002; 2006; 2010; 2014; 2018; 2022; 2026; 2030

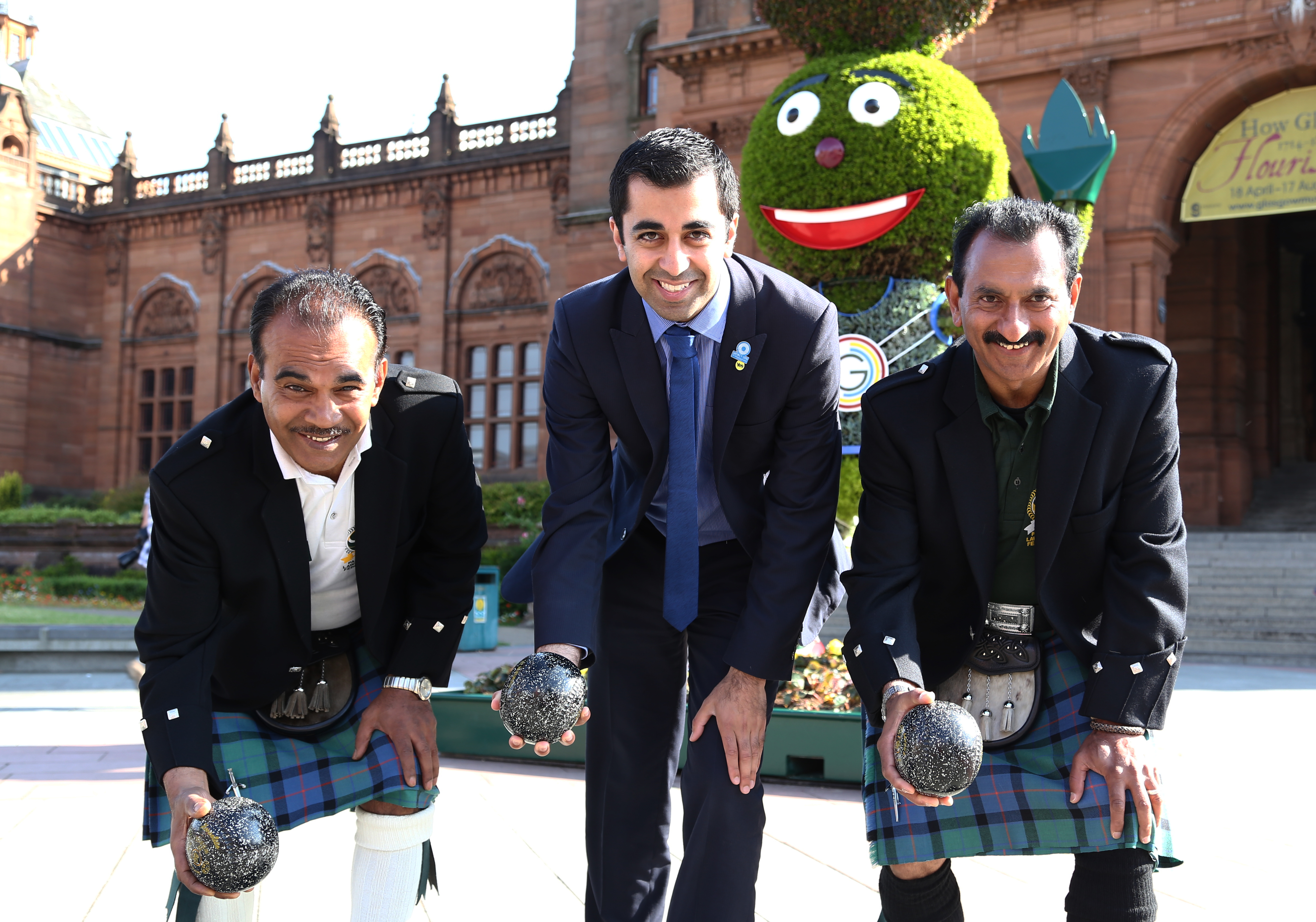
Scottish politician Humza Yousaf with Pakistani bowlers in 2014

Pakistan has competed in 15 of the 23 Commonwealth Games, from 1954. Its most successful games have been the 1962 Commonwealth Games in Perth, where it was 4th in the overall rankings and won 8 Gold Medals. Its most successful event has been Wrestling, where it has won 46 medals, 21 of which have been Gold. It ranks 3rd overall in Wrestling at the Commonwealth Games. Between 1972 and 1989 it did not participate in any of these Games as it had temporarily withdrawn from the Commonwealth.

== Medals by Games ==
Year	Gold	Silver	Bronze	Total	Rank
1930–1938	as part of British India				
1950 Auckland, New Zealand	did not participate				
1954 Vancouver, Canada	1	3	2	6	12
1958 Cardiff, Wales	3	5	2	10	7
1962 Perth, Australia	8	1	0	9	4
1966 Kingston, Jamaica	4	1	4	9	7
1970 Edinburgh, Scotland	4	3	3	10	7
1974 Christchurch, New Zealand	did not participate				
1978, Edmonton, Canada	did not participate				
1982, Brisbane, Australia	did not participate				
1986, Edinburgh, Scotland	did not participate				
1990, Auckland, New Zealand	0	0	0	0	–
1994, Victoria, Canada	0	0	3	3	23
1998, Kuala Lumpur, Malaysia	0	1	0	1	28
2002, Manchester, England	1	3	4	8	19
2006, Melbourne, Australia	1	3	1	5	17
2010, New Delhi, India	2	1	2	5	17
2014, Glasgow, Scotland	0	3	1	4	23
2018, Gold Coast, Australia	1	0	4	5	24
2022, Birmingham, England	2	3	2	7	18
2026, Glasgow, Scotland	0	0	1	1	36
Total	27	27	29	83	15

== Medals by sport ==
Sport	Gold	Silver	Bronze	Total	Rank
Athletics	3	3	6	12	20
Boxing	1	3	5	9	19
Hockey	0	1	1	2	5
Judo	0	1	1	2	16
Shooting	0	1	2	3	21
Weightlifting	2	4	3	9	15
Wrestling	21	14	11	46	3
Total	27	27	29	83	15

== Gold Medals by Sport ==
=== Athletics ===
Event	Athlete	Games
Men's hammer throw	Muhammad Iqbal	1954 Commonwealth Games
Men's 120 yards hurdles	Ghulam Raziq	1962 Commonwealth Games
Men's javelin throw	Arshad Nadeem	2022 Commonwealth Games

=== Boxing ===
Event	Athlete	Games
Featherweight	Haider Ali	2002 Commonwealth Games

=== Weightlifting ===
Event	Athlete	Games
Men's 85 kg	Shujauddin Malik	2006 Commonwealth Games
Men's +109 kg	Nooh Dastgir Butt	2022 Commonwealth Games

=== Wrestling ===
Event	Athlete	Games
Men's bantamweight	Muhammad Akhtar	1958 Commonwealth Games
Men's lightweight	Muhammad Ashraf	1958 Commonwealth Games
Men's welterweight	Muhammad Bashir	1958 Commonwealth Games
Men's flyweight	Muhammad Niaz Din	1962 Commonwealth Games
Men's bantamweight	Siraj-ud-Din	1962 Commonwealth Games
Men's featherweight	Ala-ud-Din	1962 Commonwealth Games
Men's lightweight	Muhammad Akhtar	1962 Commonwealth Games
Men's welterweight	Muhammad Bashir	1962 Commonwealth Games
Men's middleweight	Faiz Muhammad	1962 Commonwealth Games
Men's heavyweight	Muhammad Niaz	1962 Commonwealth Games
Men's flyweight	Muhammad Nazir	1966 Commonwealth Games
Men's featherweight	Muhammad Akhtar	1966 Commonwealth Games
Men's welterweight	Muhammad Bashir	1966 Commonwealth Games
Men's middleweight	Faiz Muhammad	1966 Commonwealth Games
Men's bantamweight	Muhammad Sardar	1970 Commonwealth Games
Men's featherweight	Muhammad Saeed	1970 Commonwealth Games
Men's light heavyweight	Faiz Muhammad	1970 Commonwealth Games
Men's super heavyweight	Ikram Ilahi	1970 Commonwealth Games
Men's freestyle 55 kg	Azhar Hussain	2010 Commonwealth Games
Men's freestyle 84 kg	Muhammad Inam	2010 Commonwealth Games
Men's freestyle 86 kg	Muhammad Inam	2018 Commonwealth Games

== See also ==
- Pakistan at the Olympics
- Pakistan at the Asian Games
- Pakistan at the Paralympics
