= Pakistan at the 2014 Commonwealth Games =

- CG code: PAK
- CGA: Pakistan Olympic Association
- Website: nocpakistan.org

in Glasgow, Scotland
- Flag bearer: Azhar Hussain
- Medals Ranked 23rd: Gold 0 Silver 3 Bronze 1 Total 4

Commonwealth Games appearances (overview)
- 1954; 1958; 1962; 1966; 1970; 1974–1986; 1990; 1994; 1998; 2002; 2006; 2010; 2014; 2018; 2022; 2026; 2030

Pakistan participated at the 2014 Commonwealth Games in Glasgow, Scotland. The Pakistan Olympic Association announced that its delegation for the games would consist of 62 athletes in 11 sports, but only 48 competed. Pakistan participated in badminton, boxing, gymnastics, judo, lawn bowling, shooting, swimming, table tennis, weightlifting and wrestling.

== Medallists ==
| Medal | Name | Sport | Discipline | Date |
|---|---|---|---|---|
| Silver | Shah Hussain Shah | Judo | Men's -100kg | July 26 |
| Silver | Qamar Abbas | Wrestling | 74 kg | July 29 |
| Silver | Muhammad Waseem | Boxing | 52kg | Aug 2 |
| Bronze | Azhar Hussain | Wrestling | 57 kg | July 29 |

== Badminton ==
| Athlete | Event | Round of 64 | Round of 32 | Round of 16 | Quarterfinals | Semifinals | Final |
| Athlete | Event | Opposition Result | Opposition Result | Opposition Result | Opposition Result | Opposition Result | Opposition Result |
|---|---|---|---|---|---|---|---|
| M. Irfan Saeed Bhatti | Men's Singles | S. Hardy (GGY); Won 2-0 | T. Murphy (NIR); Lost 2-1 | did not advance | | | |
| Palwasha Bashir | Women's Singles | J. Ah-Wan (SEY); Won 2-1 | M. Li (CAN); Lost 2-0 | did not advance | | | |
| M.I.S. Bhatti; P. Bashir | Mixed doubles | C. Eynon; S. Arkhipkina (FLK); Won 2-0 | B. Dullewa; M. Beruwalage (SRI); Lost 2-1 | did not advance | | | |

== Boxing ==
Men

| Athlete | Event | Round of 32 | Round of 16 | Quarterfinals | Semifinals | Final | |
| Athlete | Event | Opposition Result | Opposition Result | Opposition Result | Opposition Result | Opposition Result | Rank |
|---|---|---|---|---|---|---|---|
| Aamir Khan | 64kg | J. Jonas (NAM) Lost 30-27 | did not advance | | | | |
| Ali Ahmad | 60kg | Bye | M. Alexander (TTO) Lost | did not advance | | | |
| Hasan Asif | 69kg | S. Donnelly (NIR) Lost by TKO | did not advance | | | | |
| Muhammad Waseem | 52kg | Bye | J.R. Selvakumar (MAS) Won 29-27 | M. Mokhotho (LES) Won 29-28 | A. Omar (GHA) Won 30-27 | A. Moloney (AUS) Lost 29-28 | Silver |
| Mohibullah | 49kg | Bye | M.F. Mohd Redzuan (MAS) Lost 30-27 | did not advance | | | |
| Nadir Nadir | 56kg | Bye | J. Ham (SCO) Lost 30-27 | did not advance | | | |

== Gymnastics ==
=== Gymnastics Artistic ===
| Athlete | Event | Qualifying | | Final | |
| Athlete | Event | Points | Rank | Points | Rank |
|---|---|---|---|---|---|
| Ghulam Qadir | Team Final and Ind. Qualifications | | | | |
| Ghulam Qadir | Individual all-around | | | did not advance | |
| Ghulam Qadir | Floor | | | did not advance | |
| Ghulam Qadir | Rings | | | did not advance | |
| Ghulam Qadir | Vault | | | | |

== Judo ==
Men

| Athlete | Event | Round of 32 | Round of 16 | Quarterfinals | Semifinals | Repechage | Final / BM | |
| Athlete | Event | Opposition Result | Opposition Result | Opposition Result | Opposition Result | Opposition Result | Opposition Result | Rank |
|---|---|---|---|---|---|---|---|---|
| Shah Hussain Shah | −100 kg | —N/a | George (TRI); W 1001-0000 | Didier (AUS); W 1001-0004 | Slyfield (NZL); W 0002-0003 | Bye | Burton (SCO); L 0000-1100 | 2nd place, silver medalist(s) |

== Lawn Bowls ==
=== Men's singles ===
Section B, Rd 1, Match 3

S. Tuikiligana (FIJ) 21 - M. Shahzad (PAK) 16

Section B, Rd 2, Match 1

R. Bester (CAN) 21 - M. Shahzad (PAK) 15

Section B, Rd 3, Match 2

M.H. Abdul Rais (MAS) 21 - M. Shahzad (PAK) 5

Section B, Rd 4, Match 3

S. Bahadur (IND) 20 - M. Shahzad (PAK) 18

=== Men's Triples ===
- Maqsood Khan - Men's Triples
- Mohammad Qureshi - Men's Triples
- Muzhair Shan - Men's Triples

| Team | Played | Won | Lost | Pts Diff | Pts |
|---|---|---|---|---|---|
| Australia | 5 | 5 | 0 | +39 | 15 |
| England | 5 | 4 | 1 | +47 | 12 |
| Malaysia | 5 | 3 | 2 | +33 | 9 |
| Falkland Islands | 5 | 2 | 3 | -51 | 6 |
| Papua New Guinea | 5 | 1 | 4 | -21 | 3 |
| Pakistan | 5 | 0 | 5 | -47 | 0 |

Section B, Rd 1, Match 1

Pakistan 12 - Australia 19

Section B, Rd 2, Match 3

Pakistan 12 - Papua New Guinea 17

Section B, Rd 3, Match 3

Pakistan 9 - England 24

Section B, Rd 4, Match 2

Pakistan 12 - Malaysia 24

Section B, Rd 5, Match 3

Pakistan 15 - Falkland Islands 23

== Shooting ==
=== Men ===
| Athlete | Event | Qualifying | | Final | |
| Athlete | Event | Points | Rank | Points | Rank |
|---|---|---|---|---|---|
| Uzair Ahmed | 50m pistol | 533 | 11 | did not advance | |
| Uzair Ahmed | 10m Air Pistol | 569 | 8 | 69.0 | 8 |
| Muhammad Shehzad Akhtar | 50m pistol | 530 | 12 | did not advance | |
| Muhammad Shehzad Akhtar | 10m Air Pistol | 572 | 4 | 115.4 | 6 |
| Usman Chand | Skeet | 113 | 13 | did not advance | |
| Zeeshan Farid | 10m Air Rifle | 613.2 | 9 | did not advance | |
| Nasir Yasin | 50m rifle prone | 613.4 | 17 | did not advance | |

=== Women ===
| Athlete | Event | Qualification | | Final | |
| Athlete | Event | Points | Rank | Points | Rank |
|---|---|---|---|---|---|
| Mehwish Farhan | 10 metre air pistol | 369 | 15 | did not advance | |
| Tazeem Akhtar Abbasi | 10 metre air pistol | did not start | | | |
| Tazeem Akhtar Abbasi | 25m pistol | 558 | 12 | did not advance | |

== Swimming ==
Men

| Athlete | Event | Heat | | Semifinal | | Final | |
| Athlete | Event | Time | Rank | Time | Rank | Time | Rank |
|---|---|---|---|---|---|---|---|
| Haris Bandey | 50 m freestyle | 27.14 | 62 | did not advance | | | |
| Sikandar Khan | 50 m freestyle | 26.02 | 50 | did not advance | | | |
| Israr Hussain | 100 m freestyle | 58.36 | 53 | did not advance | | | |
| Sikandar Khan | 100 m freestyle | 57.99 | 51 | did not advance | | | |
| Nisar Ahmed | 200 m freestyle | 2:12.14 | 34 | —N/a | | did not advance | |
| Israr Hussain | 200 m freestyle | 2.06.05 | 32 | —N/a | | did not advance | |
| Israr Hussain | 400 m freestyle | 4:31.76 | 27 | —N/a | | did not advance | |
| Haris Bandey | 50 m backstroke | 32.05 | 34 | did not advance | | | |
| Haris Bandey | 50 m butterfly | 28.91 | 45 | did not advance | | | |
| Sikandar Khan | 50 m butterfly | 27.35 | 35 | did not advance | | | |
| Haris Bandey | 100 m butterfly | 1:04.37 | 32 | did not advance | | | |
| Nisar Ahmed | 200 m individual medley | 2:25.69 | 24 | —N/a | | did not advance | |

Women

| Athlete | Event | Heat | | Semifinal | | Final | |
| Athlete | Event | Time | Rank | Time | Rank | Time | Rank |
|---|---|---|---|---|---|---|---|
| Kiran Khan | 50 m freestyle | 29.46 | 51 | did not advance | | | |
| Lianna Swan | 50 m freestyle | 29.10 | 45 | did not advance | | | |
| Lianna Swan | 100 m freestyle | 1:03.32 NR | 36 | did not advance | | | |
| Bisma Khan | 50 m backstroke | 33.65 | 32 | did not advance | | | |
| Kiran Khan | 50 m backstroke | 33.11 | 30 | did not advance | | | |
| Kiran Khan | 100 m backstroke | 1:13.91 | 25 | did not advance | | | |
| Areeba Shaikh | 100 m backstroke | DSQ | | did not advance | | | |
| Areeba Shaikh | 200 m backstroke | 2:46.30 | 16 | —N/a | | did not advance | |
| Anum Bandey | 50 m breaststroke | 38.93 | 34 | did not advance | | | |
| Lianna Swan | 50 m breaststroke | 35.72 NR | 24 | did not advance | | | |
| Anum Bandey | 100 m breaststroke | 1:22.99 | 36 | did not advance | | | |
| Lianna Swan | 100 m breaststroke | 1:20.39 | 32 | did not advance | | | |
| Anum Bandey | 200 m breaststroke | 2:54.81 | 23 | —N/a | | did not advance | |
| Kiran Khan | 50 m butterfly | 30.56 | 36 | did not advance | | | |
| Areeba Shaikh | 50 m butterfly | 32.12 | 46 | did not advance | | | |
| Kiran Khan | 100 m butterfly | 1:12.14 | 29 | did not advance | | | |
| Areeba Shaikh | 100 m butterfly | 1:16.02 | 31 | did not advance | | | |
| Lianna Swan | 200 m individual medley | 2:36.19 | 23 | —N/a | | did not advance | |

== Table tennis ==
Men

| Athlete | Event | Preliminaries | | Round of 64 | Round of 32 | Round of 16 | Quarterfinals | Semifinals | Final |
| Athlete | Event | Opposition Result | Opposition Result | Opposition Result | Opposition Result | Opposition Result | Opposition Result | Opposition Result | Opposition Result |
|---|---|---|---|---|---|---|---|---|---|
| Tabish Khurshid | Men's singles | Wales D. O'Connell Lost 4-0 | Trinidad and Tobago A. Wilson Lost 4-0 | did not advance | | | | | |
| Tabish Khurshid | Men's doubles | —N/a | | Trinidad and Tobago C. Humphreys & D. St. Louis Lost 3-0 | did not advance | | | | |
| Tabish Khurshid | Mixed doubles | —N/a | Papua New Guinea D. Loi & S. Loi Won 3-0 | India S. Ghosh & P. Ghatak Lost 3-0 | did not advance | | | | |
| Muhammad Rameez | Men's singles | Northern Ireland A. Robinson Lost 4-1 | Saint Lucia O. Ferdinand Won 4-0 | did not advance | | | | | |
| Muhammad Rameez | Men's doubles | —N/a | | Trinidad and Tobago C. Humphreys & D. St. Louis Lost 3-0 | did not advance | | | | |
| Muhammad Rameez | Mixed doubles | —N/a | Sri Lanka U. Ranasingha & E. Warusawithana Lost 3-1 | did not advance | | | | | |

Women

| Athlete | Event | Preliminaries | | Round of 64 | Round of 32 | Round of 16 | Quarterfinals | Semifinals | Final |
| Athlete | Event | Opposition Result | Opposition Result | Opposition Result | Opposition Result | Opposition Result | Opposition Result | Opposition Result | Opposition Result |
|---|---|---|---|---|---|---|---|---|---|
| Farwa Babar | Women's singles | Papua New Guinea I. Chris Won 4-0 | Northern Ireland A. Mogey Lost 4-0 | did not advance | | | | | |
| Farwa Babar | Women's doubles | —N/a | | Northern Ireland H. Lynch-Dawson & E. Ludlow Lost 3-0 | did not advance | | | | |
| Farwa Babar | Mixed doubles | —N/a | Sri Lanka U. Ranasingha & E. Warusawithana Lost 3-1 | did not advance | | | | | |
| Abeera Sheikh | Women's singles | Nigeria C. Akpan Lost 4-0 | Botswana B. Butale Won 4-2 | did not advance | | | | | |
| Abeera Sheikh | Women's doubles | —N/a | | Northern Ireland H. Lynch-Dawson & E. Ludlow Lost 3-0 | did not advance | | | | |
| Abeera Sheikh | Mixed doubles | —N/a | Papua New Guinea D. Loi & S. Loi Won 3-0 | India S. Ghosh & P. Ghatak Lost 3-0 | did not advance | | | | |

== Weightlifting ==
| Athlete | Event | Final | |
| Athlete | Event | Weight | Rank |
|---|---|---|---|
| Haider Ali | Men's 77 kg | 244 kg | 20 |
| Habib Muhammad Asghar | Men's 85 kg | 279 kg | 12 |
| Mohammed Shahzad | Men's 56 kg | 240 kg | 4 |
| Haroon Shukat | Men's 105 kg | 312 kg | 7 |
| Abu Sufyan | Men's 69 kg | 245 kg | 14 |

== Wrestling ==
=== Men's freestyle ===
| Competitor(s) | Event | Round of 16 result | Opponent | Quarterfinals result | Opponent | Repechage result | Opponent | Semi-finals result | Opponent | Bronze match result | Opponent | Finals result | Opponent | Rank |
|---|---|---|---|---|---|---|---|---|---|---|---|---|---|---|
| Qamar Abbas | 74 kg | Won by Technical superiority | Solomon Islands K. Tebitara | Won by Technical superiority | Malta D. Galea | —N/a | | Won by Fall | England M. Grundy | —N/a | | Lost by Fall | India S. Kumar | Silver |
| Zaman Anwar | 125 kg | Won by Technical superiority | South Africa A. Digovich | Lost 3-1 | England C. Xxx | —N/a | | did not advance | | | | | | |
| Azhar Hussain | 57 kg | Won by Technical superiority | Sri Lanka G. Kathurangana | Won by Technical superiority | Australia S. Parker | —N/a | | Lost by Technical superiority | India A. Amit Kumar | Won by Technical superiority | South Africa B. Masunyane | did not advance | | Bronze |
| Muhammad Inam | 86 kg | Won by Technical superiority | Sri Lanka; E. Mudiyans | Lost 11-4 | Canada; T. Tagziev | Won by Fall | Australia A. Abdo | —N/a | | Lost 6-6 (3-1) | India P. Kumar | did not advance | | 4th |
| Muhammad Salman | 65 kg | Won 6-6 (3-1) | England; P. Roberts | Lost 14-6 | Canada; J. Balfour | Lost 3-2 | Nigeria; S. Clarkson | did not advance | | | | | | |
| Umair Tariq | 97 kg | —N/a | | Lost 8-2 | England L. Rattigan | did not advance | | | | | | | | |
| Abdul Wahab | 61 kg | Lost by Technical superiority | Nigeria A. Daniel | Did not advance | | | | | | | | | | |
