= Pakistan at the 2018 Commonwealth Games =

- Flag of Pakistan
- CG code: PAK
- CGA: Pakistan Olympic Association
- Website: nocpakistan.org

in Gold Coast, Australia 4 April 2018 – 15 April 2018
- Competitors: 56 in 10 sports
- Flag bearer: Usman Amjad Rathore (opening)
- Medals Ranked 24th: Gold 1 Silver 0 Bronze 4 Total 5

Commonwealth Games appearances (overview)
- 1954; 1958; 1962; 1966; 1970; 1974–1986; 1990; 1994; 1998; 2002; 2006; 2010; 2014; 2018; 2022; 2026; 2030

Pakistan competed at the 2018 Commonwealth Games in the Gold Coast, Australia from 4 April to 15 April 2018.

Weightlifter Usman Amjad Rathore was the country's flag bearer during the opening ceremony.

== Competitors ==
The following is the list of number of competitors participating at the Games per sport/discipline.

| Sport | Men | Women | Total |
|---|---|---|---|
| Athletics | 1 | 1 | 2 |
| Badminton | 2 | 2 | 4 |
| Boxing | 4 | 0 | 4 |
| Field hockey | 18 | 0 | 18 |
| Shooting | 5 | 2 | 7 |
| Squash | 2 | 2 | 4 |
| Swimming | 1 | 1 | 2 |
| Table tennis | 2 | 2 | 4 |
| Weightlifting | 5 | 0 | 5 |
| Wrestling | 6 | 0 | 6 |
| Total | 46 | 10 | 56 |

== Medalists ==
| Medal | Name | Sport | Event | Date |
|---|---|---|---|---|
| Gold | Muhammad Inam | Wrestling | 86 kg | April 14 |
| Bronze | Talha Talib | Weightlifting | 62 kg | April 5 |
| Bronze | Muhammad Nooh Dastgir Butt | Weightlifting | +105 kg | April 9 |
| Bronze | Muhammad Bilal | Wrestling | 57 kg | April 12 |
| Bronze | Tayab Raza | Wrestling | 125 kg | April 14 |

Medals by sport
| Sport | 1st place, gold medalist(s) | 2nd place, silver medalist(s) | 3rd place, bronze medalist(s) | Total |
| Weightlifting | 0 | 0 | 2 | 2 |
| Wrestling | 1 | 0 | 2 | 3 |
| Total | 1 | 0 | 4 | 5 |

Medals by date
| Day | Date | 1st place, gold medalist(s) | 2nd place, silver medalist(s) | 3rd place, bronze medalist(s) | Total |
| 1 | 5 April | 0 | 0 | 1 | 1 |
| 2 | 6 April | 0 | 0 | 0 | 0 |
| 3 | 7 April | 0 | 0 | 0 | 0 |
| 4 | 8 April | 0 | 0 | 0 | 0 |
| 5 | 9 April | 0 | 0 | 1 | 1 |
| 6 | 10 April | 0 | 0 | 0 | 0 |
| 7 | 11 April | 0 | 0 | 0 | 0 |
| 8 | 12 April | 0 | 0 | 1 | 1 |
| 9 | 13 April | 0 | 0 | 0 | 0 |
| 10 | 14 April | 1 | 0 | 1 | 2 |
| 11 | 15 April | 0 | 0 | 0 | 0 |
| Total | | 1 | 0 | 4 | 5 |

Medals by gender
| Gender | 1st place, gold medalist(s) | 2nd place, silver medalist(s) | 3rd place, bronze medalist(s) | Total |
| Male | 1 | 0 | 4 | 5 |
| Female | 0 | 0 | 0 | 0 |
| Mixed | 0 | 0 | 0 | 0 |
| Total | 1 | 0 | 4 | 5 |

== Athletics ==
Men
Field events

| Athlete | Event | Qualification | | Final | |
| Athlete | Event | Distance | Rank | Distance | Rank |
|---|---|---|---|---|---|
| Arshad Nadeem | Javelin throw | 80.45 | 2 Q | 76.02 | 8 |

Women
Track & road events

| Athlete | Event | Heat | | Semifinal | | Final | |
| Athlete | Event | Result | Rank | Result | Rank | Result | Rank |
|---|---|---|---|---|---|---|---|
| Najma Parveen | 200 m | 25.21 | 33 | Did not advance | | | |
| Najma Parveen | 400 m | 57.12 | 31 | Did not advance | | | |

== Badminton ==
Pakistan participated with four athletes (two men and two women)

Singles

| Athlete | Event | Round of 64 | Round of 32 | Round of 16 | Quarterfinal | Semifinal | Final / BM | |
| Athlete | Event | Opposition Score | Opposition Score | Opposition Score | Opposition Score | Opposition Score | Opposition Score | Rank |
|---|---|---|---|---|---|---|---|---|
| Murad Ali | Men's singles | Buwaneka Goonethilleka (SRI); L 2-0 | Did not advance | | | | | |
| Muhammad Irfan Bhatti | Men's singles | BYE | Anthony Joe (AUS); L 2-0 | Did not advance | | | | |
| Palwasha Bashir | Women's singles | Nicki Chan-Lam (MRI); L 2-0 | Did not advance | | | | | |
| Mahoor Shahzad | Women's singles | Alissa Dean (FIJ); W 2-0 | Cristen Marritt (IOM); W 2-0 | Rachel Honderich (CAN); L 2-0 | Did not advance | | | |

Doubles

| Athlete | Event | Round of 64 | Round of 32 | Round of 16 | Quarterfinal | Semifinal | Final / BM | |
| Athlete | Event | Opposition Score | Opposition Score | Opposition Score | Opposition Score | Opposition Score | Opposition Score | Rank |
|---|---|---|---|---|---|---|---|---|
| Murad Ali; Muhammad Irfan Bhatti | Men's doubles | —N/a | Sawan Serasinghe (AUS); Matthew Chau (AUS); L 2-0 | Did not advance | | | | |
| Palwasha Bashir; Mahoor Shahzad | Women's doubles | —N/a | Thilini Hendahewa (SRI); Kavidi Sirimannage (SRI); L 2-0 | Did not advance | | | | |
| Palwasha Bashir; Muhammad Irfan Bhatti | Mixed doubles | Julien Paul (MRI); Aurélie Allet (MRI); L 2-1 | Did not advance | | | | | |
| Mahoor Shahzad; Murad Ali | Mixed doubles | Martin Campbell (SCO); Julie MacPherson (SCO); L 2-0 | Did not advance | | | | | |

Mixed team

Roster

- Murad Ali
- Palwasha Bashir
- Muhammad Irfan Bhatti
- Mahoor Shahzad

Pool A

| Pos | Team | Pld | W | L | MF | MA | MD | GF | GA | GD | PF | PA | PD | Pts | Qualification |
|---|---|---|---|---|---|---|---|---|---|---|---|---|---|---|---|
| 1 | India | 3 | 3 | 0 | 15 | 0 | +15 | 30 | 1 | +29 | 651 | 401 | +250 | 3 | Knockout stage |
| 2 | Scotland | 3 | 2 | 1 | 9 | 6 | +3 | 19 | 13 | +6 | 592 | 476 | +116 | 2 | Knockout stage |
| 3 | Sri Lanka | 3 | 1 | 2 | 5 | 10 | −5 | 12 | 21 | −9 | 526 | 619 | −93 | 1 | |
| 4 | Pakistan | 3 | 0 | 3 | 1 | 14 | −13 | 2 | 28 | −26 | 348 | 621 | −273 | 0 | |

Source: GC2018

Scotland
5
Carrara Sports and Leisure Centre, Gold Coast
5 April

Pakistan
0

| | | | 1 | 2 | 3 |
|---|---|---|---|---|---|
| 1 | (Scotland) (Pakistan) | Alexander Dunn / Eleanor O'Donnell; Murad Ali / Palwasha Bashir | 21; 12 | 21; 13 |
| 2 | (Scotland) (Pakistan) | Kieran Merrilees; Muhammad Irfan Bhatti | 21; 6 | 21; 16 |
| 3 | (Scotland) (Pakistan) | Kirsty Gilmour; Mahoor Shahzad | 21; 6 | 21; 10 |
| 4 | (Scotland) (Pakistan) | Martin Campbell / Patrick MacHugh; Murad Ali / Muhammad Irfan Bhatti | 21; 8 | 21; 10 |
| 5 | (Scotland) (Pakistan) | Julie MacPherson / Eleanor O'Donnell; Mahoor Shahzad / Palwasha Bashir | 21; 6 | 21; 4 |

India
5
Carrara Sports and Leisure Centre, Gold Coast
5 April

Pakistan
0

| | | | 1 | 2 | 3 |
|---|---|---|---|---|---|
| 1 | (India) (Pakistan) | Satwiksairaj Rankireddy / N. Sikki Reddy; Muhammad Irfan Saeed Bhatti / Palwasha Bashir | 21; 10 | 21; 13 |
| 2 | (India) (Pakistan) | Srikanth Kidambi; Murad Ali | 21; 16 | 22; 20 |
| 3 | (India) (Pakistan) | Saina Nehwal; Mahoor Shahzad | 21; 7 | 21; 11 |
| 4 | (India) (Pakistan) | Pranaav Jerry Chopra / Chirag Shetty; Muhammad Irfan Saeed Bhatti / Murad Ali | 21; 9 | 21; 15 |
| 5 | (India) (Pakistan) | Ashwini Ponnappa / Gadde Ruthvika Shivani; Mahoor Shahzad / Palwasha Bashir | 21; 6 | 21; 10 |

Pakistan
1
Carrara Sports and Leisure Centre, Gold Coast
6 April

Sri Lanka
4

| | | | 1 | 2 | 3 |
|---|---|---|---|---|---|
| 1 | (Pakistan) (Sri Lanka) | Irfan Saeed Bhatti / Palwasha Bashir; Buwaneka Goonethilleka / Kavidi Sirimannage | 16; 21 | 4; 21 |
| 2 | (Pakistan) (Sri Lanka) | Murad Ali; Dinuka Karunaratne | 18; 21 | 17; 21 |
| 3 | (Pakistan) (Sri Lanka) | Mahoor Shahzad; Madushika Dilrukshi | 21; 14 | 21; 18 |
| 4 | (Pakistan) (Sri Lanka) | Murad Ali / Irfan Saeed Bhatti; Buwaneka Goonethilleka / Sachin Dias | 11; 21 | 14; 21 |
| 5 | (Pakistan) (Sri Lanka) | Mahoor Shahzad / Palwasha Bashir; Thilini Hendahewa / Kavidi Sirimannage | 7; 21 | 11; 21 |

== Boxing ==
Pakistan participated with a team of 4 athletes (4 men).

Men

| Athlete | Event | Round of 32 | Round of 16 | Quarterfinals | Semifinals | Final | Rank |
| Athlete | Event | Opposition Result | Opposition Result | Opposition Result | Opposition Result | Opposition Result | Rank |
|---|---|---|---|---|---|---|---|
| Syed Asif | −52 kg | —N/a | Brian Agina (KEN); W 4-1 | Reece McFadden (SCO); L 5-0 | Did not advance | | |
| Ali Ahmad | −60 kg | BYE | Calum French (ENG); L 0-5 | Did not advance | | | |
| Gul Zaib | −69 kg | B Le Poullain (GUE); W 3-2 | A Walsh (NIR); L 0-5 | Did not advance | | | |
| Awais Ali Khan | −81 kg | —N/a | BYE | Ato Plodzicki-Faoagali (SAM); L 5-0 | Did not advance | | |

== Hockey ==
=== Men's tournament ===
Roster

- Mazhar Abbas
- Tasawar Abbas
- Mubashar Ali
- Muhammad Arshad
- Muhammad Atiq
- Ammad Shakeel Butt
- Imran Butt
- Muhammad Dilber
- Muhammad Irfan
- Muhammad Irfan
- Abu Mahmood
- Muhammad Qadir
- Muhammad Arslan Qadir
- Shafqat Rasool
- Rana Riaz
- Muhammad Rizwan
- Ali Shan
- Tazeem Ul Hassan

Pool B

| Pos | Team | Pld | W | D | L | GF | GA | GD | Pts | Qualification |
|---|---|---|---|---|---|---|---|---|---|---|
| 1 | India | 4 | 3 | 1 | 0 | 12 | 9 | +3 | 10 | Advance to Semi-finals |
| 2 | England | 4 | 2 | 1 | 1 | 15 | 8 | +7 | 7 | Advance to Semi-finals |
| 3 | Malaysia | 4 | 1 | 1 | 2 | 5 | 10 | −5 | 4 | 5th–6th place match |
| 4 | Pakistan | 4 | 0 | 4 | 0 | 6 | 6 | 0 | 4 | 7th–8th place match |
| 5 | Wales | 4 | 0 | 1 | 3 | 6 | 11 | −5 | 1 | 9th–10th place match |

Source: FIH
Rules for classification: 1) points; 2) number of wins; 3) goal difference; 4) goals scored; 5) head-to-head results.

5 April 2018
19:30

| Pakistan | 1–1 | Wales |
|---|---|---|
| Ali 39' | Report | Shipperley 33' |

Umpires:
Sean Rapaport (RSA)
David Sweetman (GBR)

7 April 2018
14:30

| India | 2–2 | Pakistan |
|---|---|---|
| D. Singh 13'; H. Singh 20' | Report | Md. Irfan Jr 39'; Ali 60' |

Umpires:
Lim Hong Zhen (SGP)
David Sweetman (SCO)

8 April 2018
14:30

| England | 2–2 | Pakistan |
|---|---|---|
| Gleghorne 34'; Ward 51' | Report | Md. Arslan 33'; Ali 57' |

Umpires:
Ben de Young (AUS)
Sam Rapaport (RSA)

11 April 2018
14:30

| Malaysia | 1–1 | Pakistan |
|---|---|---|
| Ramadan 39' | Report | Shafqat 9' |

Umpires:
Paul Walker (ENG)
Tyler Klenk (CAN)

Seventh and eighth place

13 April 2018
10:45

| Canada | 1–3 | Pakistan |
|---|---|---|
| Kirkpatrick 12' | Report | Md. Arslan 34'; Ali 40'; Md. Irfan Jr. 57' |

Umpires:
Eric Koh (MAS)
Tim Bond (NZ)

== Shooting ==
Pakistan participated with 7 athletes (5 men and 2 women).

Men

| Athlete | Event | Qualification | | Final | |
| Athlete | Event | Points | Rank | Points | Rank |
|---|---|---|---|---|---|
| Ghufran Adil | 10 metre air rifle | 613.9 | 10 | Did not qualify | |
| Ghufran Adil | 50 metre rifle prone | 602.3 | 23 | Did not qualify | |
| Ghufran Adil | 50 metre rifle 3 positions | 1145 -44x | 8 Q | 390.5 | 8 |
| Muhammad Khalil Akhtar | 25 metre rapid fire pistol | 571 -14x | 4 Q | 8 | 6 |
| Aamer Iqbal | Trap | 106 | 24 | Did not qualify | |
| Muhammad Farrukh Nadeem | Trap | 113 | 14 | Did not qualify | |
| Aamer Iqbal | Double trap | 132 | 6 Q | 31 | 5 |
| Muhammad Farrukh Nadeem | Double trap | 122 | 14 | Did not qualify | |
| Usman Chand | Skeet | 117 | 11 | Did not qualify | |

Women

| Athlete | Event | Qualification | | Final | |
| Athlete | Event | Points | Rank | Points | Rank |
|---|---|---|---|---|---|
| Minhal Sohail | 10 metre air rifle | 406.2 | 12 | Did not qualify | |
| Mehwish Farhan | 10 metre air pistol | 375 -7x | 6 Q | 112.1 | 8 |
| Mehwish Farhan | 25 metre pistol | 559 -12x | 11 | Did not qualify | |

== Squash ==
Pakistan participated with 4 athletes (2 men and 2 women).

Individual

| Athlete | Event | Round of 64 | Round of 32 | Round of 16 | Quarterfinals | Semifinals | Final | |
| Athlete | Event | Opposition Score | Opposition Score | Opposition Score | Opposition Score | Opposition Score | Opposition Score | Rank |
|---|---|---|---|---|---|---|---|---|
| Tayyab Aslam | Men's singles | Sorrentino (IVB); W 3–0 | Clyne (SCO); L 3–1 | Did not advance | | | | |
| Farhan Zaman | Men's singles | Chapman (IVB); W 3–1 | Willstrop (ENG); L 3–0 | Did not advance | | | | |
| Faiza Zafar | Women's singles | Bye | Urquhart (AUS); L 3–0 | Did not advance | | | | |
| Madina Zafar | Women's singles | Saffery (WAL); L 3–0 | Did not advance | | | | | |

Doubles

| Athlete | Event | Group stage | | | | Round of 16 | Quarterfinals | Semifinals | Final | |
| Athlete | Event | Opposition Score | Opposition Score | Opposition Score | Rank | Opposition Score | Opposition Score | Opposition Score | Opposition Score | Rank |
|---|---|---|---|---|---|---|---|---|---|---|
| Tayyab Aslam; Farhan Zaman | Men's doubles | Declan (ENG); Willstrop (ENG); L 2–0 | Chapman (IVB); Sorrentino (IVB); W 2–0 | —N/a | 2 Q | Coll (NZL); Grayson (NZL); L 2–0 | Did not advance | | | |
| Faiza Zafar; Madina Zafar | Women's doubles | Chinappa (IND); Pallikal Karthik (IND); L 2–1 | Kellas (MLT); Sultana (MLT); L 2–0 | Evans (WAL); Saffery (WAL); L 2–0 | 4 | —N/a | Did not advance | | | |
| Faiza Zafar; Farhan Zaman | Mixed doubles | Fernandes (GUY); Seth (GUY); W 2–0 | Urquhart (AUS); Pilley (AUS); L 2–0 | —N/a | 2 Q | Evans (WAL); Creed (WAL); L 2–0 | Did not advance | | | |
| Madina Zafar; Tayyab Aslam | Mixed doubles | Ghosal (IND); Pallikal Karthik (IND); L 2–0 | Fung-A-Fat (GUY); Khalil (GUY); W 2–0 | —N/a | 2 Q | Grinham (AUS); Cuskelly (AUS); L 2–0 | Did not advance | | | |

== Swimming ==
Pakistan participated with 2 athletes (1 man and 1 woman).

Men

| Athlete | Event | Heat | | Semifinal | | Final | |
| Athlete | Event | Time | Rank | Time | Rank | Time | Rank |
|---|---|---|---|---|---|---|---|
| Syed Tariq | 50 m freestyle | 24.82 | 43 | Did not advance | | | |
| Syed Tariq | 100 m freestyle | 54.21 | 41 | Did not advance | | | |
| Syed Tariq | 50 m backstroke | 27.39 | 12 Q | 27.23 | 12 | Did not advance | |
| Syed Tariq | 100 m backstroke | 59.39 | 19 | Did not advance | | | |

Women

| Athlete | Event | Heat | | Semifinal | | Final | |
| Athlete | Event | Time | Rank | Time | Rank | Time | Rank |
|---|---|---|---|---|---|---|---|
| Bisma Khan | 50 m freestyle | 28.75 | 32 | Did not advance | | | |
| Bisma Khan | 100 m freestyle | 1:02.66 | 31 | Did not advance | | | |
| Bisma Khan | 50 m backstroke | 31.43 | 27 | Did not advance | | | |

== Table tennis ==
Pakistan participated with 4 athletes (2 men and 2 women).

Singles

| Athletes | Event | Group stage | | | Round of 64 | Round of 32 | Round of 16 | Quarterfinal | Semifinal | Final | Rank |
| Athletes | Event | Opposition Score | Opposition Score | Rank | Opposition Score | Opposition Score | Opposition Score | Opposition Score | Opposition Score | Opposition Score | Rank |
|---|---|---|---|---|---|---|---|---|---|---|---|
| Fahad Khawaja | Men's singles | Sultan (SEY); L 4–1 | Yogarajah (MRI); L 4–2 | 3 | Did not advance | | | | | | |
| Muhammad Rameez | Men's singles | Doughty (BAR); W 4–0 | Mutua (KEN); W 4–0 | 1 Q | —N/a | Gnanasekaran (IND); L 4–0 | Did not advance | | | | |
| Hareem Ali | Women's singles | Kapugeekiyana (SRI); L 4–0 | Yeung (CAN); L 4–0 | 3 | —N/a | Did not advance | | | | | |
| Fatima Khan | Women's singles | Thomas (WAL); L 4–0 | Freemam (SKN); W 4–1 | 2 | —N/a | Did not advance | | | | | |

Doubles

| Athletes | Event | Round of 64 | Round of 32 | Round of 16 | Quarterfinal | Semifinal | Final | Rank |
| Athletes | Event | Opposition Score | Opposition Score | Opposition Score | Opposition Score | Opposition Score | Opposition Score | Rank |
|---|---|---|---|---|---|---|---|---|
| Fahad Khawaja; Muhammad Rameez | Men's doubles | —N/a | Bode Abiodun; Olajide Omotayo (NGR); L 3–0 | Did not advance | | | | |
| Hareem Ali; Fatima Khan | Women's doubles | —N/a | Ying Ho; Karen Lyne (MAS); L 3–0 | Did not advance | | | | |
| Hareem Ali; Fahad Khawaja | Mixed doubles | Antoine Bernadet; Justina Yeung (CAN); L 3–0 | Did not advance | | | | | |
| Fatima Khan; Muhammad Rameez | Mixed doubles | Rhikesh Taucoory; Elodi Ho Wan Kau (MRI); L 3–0 | Did not advance | | | | | |

== Weightlifting ==
Pakistan participated with 5 athletes (5 men).

Men

| Athlete | Event | Snatch | | Clean & jerk | | Total | Rank |
| Athlete | Event | Result | Rank | Result | Rank | Total | Rank |
|---|---|---|---|---|---|---|---|
| Abdullah Ghafoor | −56 kg | 101 | 5 | 126 | 6 | 227 | 6 |
| Talha Talib | −62 kg | 132 | 1 | 151 | 5 | 283 | 3rd place, bronze medalist(s) |
| Abu Sufyan | −69 kg | 130 | 5 | Did not finish | | | |
| Usman Rathore | −94 kg | 150 | 7 | Did not finish | | | |
| Muhammad Nooh Dastgir Butt | +105 kg | 173 | 4 | 222 | 3 | 395 | 3rd place, bronze medalist(s) |

== Wrestling ==
Pakistan participated with 6 athletes (6 men).

Men

| Athlete | Event | Round of 16 | Quarterfinal | Semifinal | Repechage | Final / BM | |
| Athlete | Event | Opposition Result | Opposition Result | Opposition Result | Opposition Result | Opposition Result | Rank |
|---|---|---|---|---|---|---|---|
| Muhammad Bilal | -57 kg | Gary Giordmaina (MLT); W 12–2 | Charles Fernando (SRI); W 12–2 | Rahul Aware (IND); L 12–8 | —N/a | George Ramm (ENG); W 6–1 | 3rd place, bronze medalist(s) |
| Abdul Wahab | -65 kg | Adam Vella (MLT); W 12-2 | Vincent De Marinis (CAN); L 10-0 | Did not advance | | | |
| Muhammad Asad Butt | -74 kg | Oleg Gladkov (SCO); W 10-3 | Sushil Kumar (IND); L 10-0 | Did not advance | Jevon Balfour (CAN); L 10-0 | Did not advance | |
| Muhammad Inam | -86 kg | Jayden Lawrence (AUS); W 14–4 | Somveer (IND); W 10–0 | Alexander Moore (CAN); W by fall | —N/a | Melvin Bibo (NGR); W 6–0 | 1st place, gold medalist(s) |
| Umair Ahmad | -97 kg | Jordan Steen (CAN); L 11-0 | Did not advance | | | | |

| Athlete | Event | Nordic Round Robin | | | | Rank |
| Athlete | Event | Opposition Result | Opposition Result | Opposition Result | Opposition Result | Rank |
|---|---|---|---|---|---|---|
| Tayab Raza | -125 kg | Sinivie Boltic (NGR); W 10–2 | Claude Kouamen Mbianga (CMR); W by injury | Sumit (IND); L 10–4 | Korey Jarvis (CAN); L 9–0 | 3rd place, bronze medalist(s) |

== See also ==
- Pakistan at the 2018 Summer Youth Olympics
