= Wrestling at the 2010 Commonwealth Games =

- Venue: Indira Gandhi Arena
- Location: Delhi, India
- Dates: 5 to 10 October 2010.

Wrestling at the 2010 Commonwealth Games was the 16th appearance of Wrestling at the Commonwealth Games, returning after being left out the 2006 Commonwealth Games. The wrestling events for the 2010 Commonwealth Games were held at the Indira Gandhi Arena in Delhi, India, from 5 to 10 October 2010. Unlike other major wrestling events only one bronze medal was awarded per event.

== Medal table ==
* Host nation (India)

Rank	Nation	Gold	Silver	Bronze	Total
1	India*	10	5	4	19
2	Canada	4	5	5	14
3	Nigeria	3	3	7	13
4	Pakistan	2	1	0	3
5	England	1	1	2	4
6	Australia	1	1	1	3
7	South Africa	0	4	1	5
8	Cameroon	0	1	1	2
Totals (8 entries)		21	21	21	63

== Events ==
=== Men's events ===
==== Freestyle ====
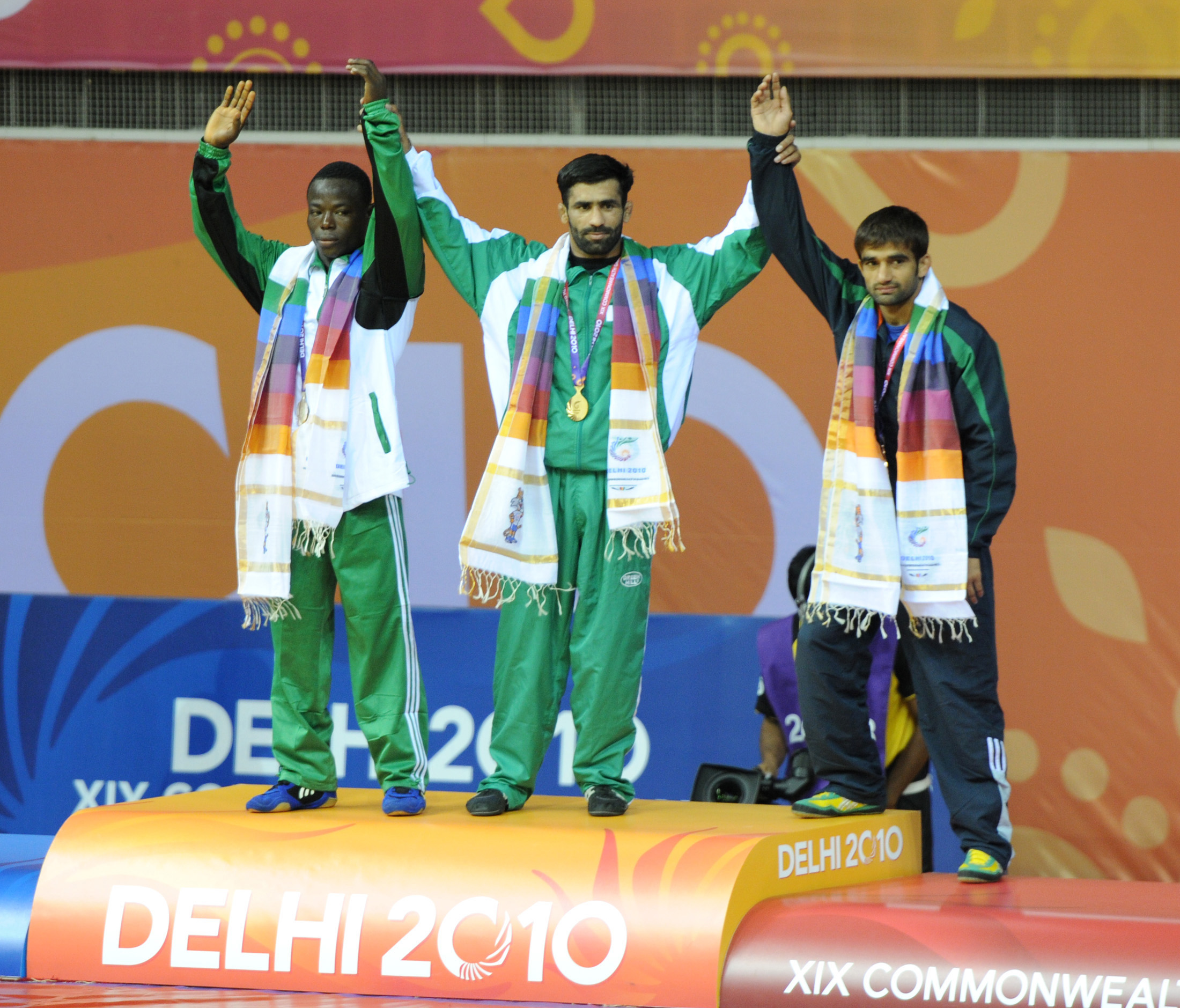
XIX Commonwealth Games-2010 Delhi Wrestling (Men’s Freestyle 55Kg) Azhar Hussain of Pakistan (Gold), Ebikewenimo Welson of Nigeria (Silver) and Anil Kumar of India (Bronze), during the medal presentation ceremony

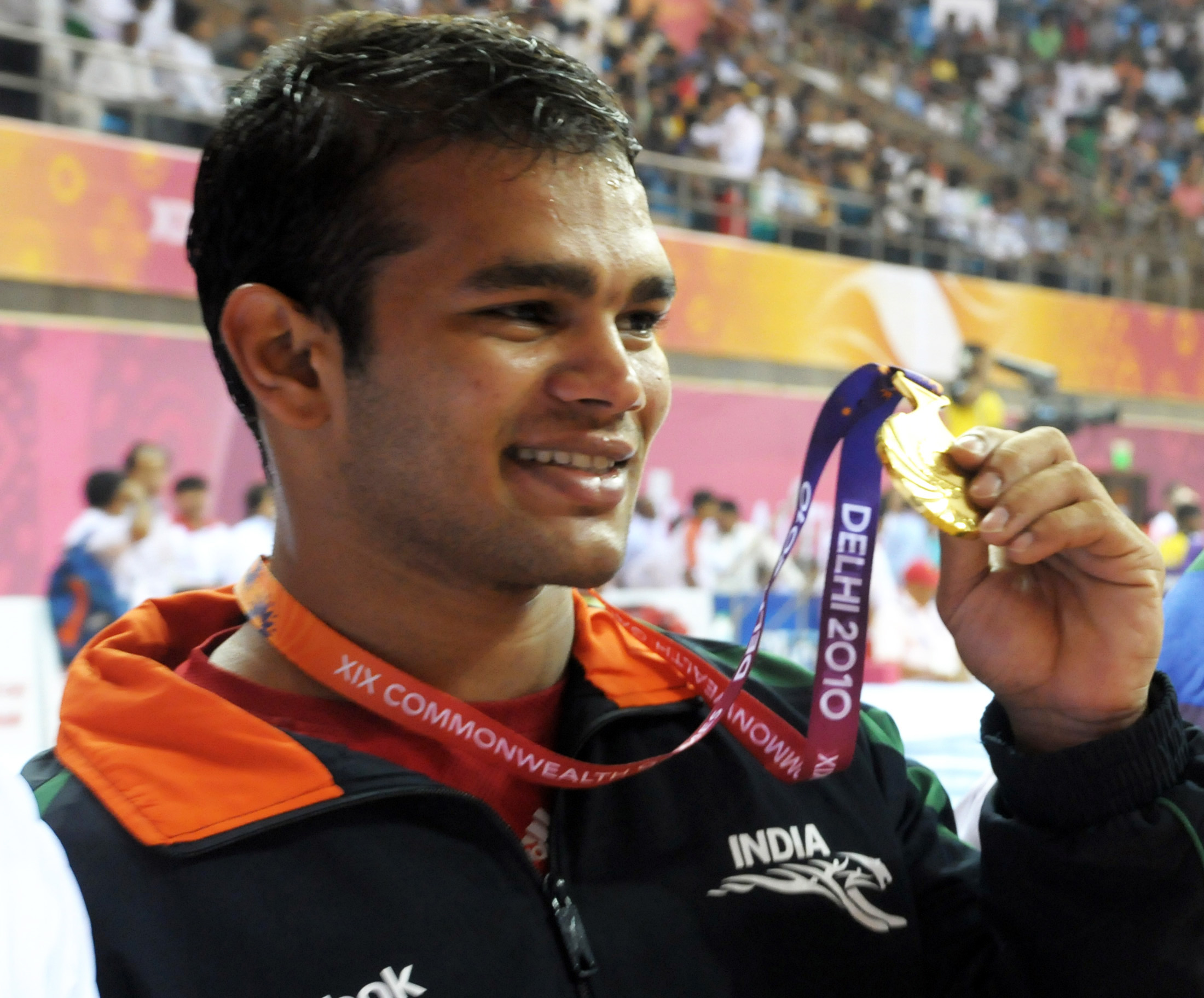
XIX Commonwealth Games-2010 Delhi (Men’s) Wrestling 74Kg Freestyle Narsingh Yadav of India won the gold medal, at Indira Gandhi Stadium, in New Delhi on October 09, 2010

Event	Gold	Silver	Bronze
55 kg	Azhar Hussain; Pakistan	Ebikewenimo Welson; Nigeria	Anil Kumar; India
60 kg	Yogeshwar Dutt; India	James Mancini; Canada	Sasha Madyarchyk; England
66 kg	Sushil Kumar; India	Heinrich Barnes; South Africa	Chris Prickett; Canada
74 kg	Narsingh Yadav; India	Richard Addinall; South Africa	Evan MacDonald; Canada
84 kg	Muhammad Inam; Pakistan	Anuj Kumar; India	Andrew Dick; Nigeria
96 kg	Sinivie Boltic; Nigeria	Korey Jarvis; Canada	Leon Rattigan; England
120 kg	Arjan Bhullar; Canada	Joginder Kumar; India	Hugues Onanena; Cameroon

==== Greco-Roman ====
Event	Gold	Silver	Bronze
55 kg	Rajender Kumar; India	Azhar Hussain; Pakistan	Promise Mwenga; Canada
60 kg	Ravinder Singh; India	Terence Christopher Bosson; England	Romeo Joseph; Nigeria
66 kg	Myroslav Dykun; England	Jack Bond; Canada	Sunil Kumar; India
74 kg	Sanjay Kumar; India	Richard Brian Addinall; South Africa	Hassan Shahsavan; Australia
84 kg	Efionayi Agbonavbare; Nigeria	Manoj Kumar; India	Dean van Zyl; South Africa
96 kg	Anil Kumar; India	Kakoma Hugues Bella-Lufu; South Africa	Eric Feunekes; Canada
120 kg	Ivan Popov; Australia	Talaram Mamma; Nigeria	Dharmender Dalal; India

=== Women's events ===
==== Freestyle ====
Event	Gold	Silver	Bronze
48 kg	Carol Huynh; Canada	Nirmala Devi; India	Odunayo Adekuoroye; Nigeria
51 kg	Ifeoma Christiana Nwoye; Nigeria	Babita Kumari; India	Jessica Macdonald; Canada
55 kg	Geeta Phogat; India	Emily Bensted; Australia	Lovina Edward; Nigeria
59 kg	Alka Tomar; India	Tonya Verbeek; Canada	Tega Tosin Richard; Nigeria
63 kg	Justine Bouchard; Canada	Blessing Oborududu; Nigeria	Suman Kundu; India
67 kg	Anita Sheoran; India	Megan Buydens; Canada	Ifeoma Iheanacho; Nigeria
72 kg	Ohenewa Akuffo; Canada	Laure Ali Annabel; Cameroon	Hellen Okus; Nigeria

== Participating nations ==
- Australia (19)
- Cameroon (2)
- Canada (16)
- Cyprus (2)
- England (12)
- The Gambia (2)
- India (21)
- Kenya (4)
- Malta (1)
- Mauritius (2)
- New Zealand (6)
- Niue (1)
- Northern Ireland (1)
- Pakistan (6)
- Samoa (4)
- Scotland (10)
- Sierra Leone (2)
- Solomon Islands (2)
- South Africa (13)
- Sri Lanka (3)
- Wales (7)

== Popular culture ==
Geeta Phogat was India's first female wrestler to win at the 2010 Commonwealth Games, where she won the gold medal (55 kg) while her sister Babita Kumari won the silver (51 kg). This came back in the 2016 Indian movie Dangal.
