= Pakistan at the 2022 Commonwealth Games =

- Flag of Pakistan
- CG code: PAK
- CGA: National Olympic Committee of Pakistan
- Website: nocpakistan.org

in Birmingham, England 28 July 2022 – 8 August 2022
- Competitors: 67 (42 men and 25 women) in 12 sports
- Flag bearers (opening): Muhammad Inam; Bismah Maroof
- Flag bearer (closing): Zaman Anwar
- Medals Ranked 18th: Gold 2 Silver 3 Bronze 2 Total 7

Commonwealth Games appearances (overview)
- 1954; 1958; 1962; 1966; 1970; 1974–1986; 1990; 1994; 1998; 2002; 2006; 2010; 2014; 2018; 2022; 2026; 2030

Pakistan competed at the 2022 Commonwealth Games at Birmingham, England from 28 July to 8 August 2022. It was Pakistan's 14th appearance at the Commonwealth Games.

Muhammad Inam and Bismah Maroof were the country's flagbearers at the 2022 Commonwealth Games opening ceremony.

Arshad Nadeem won Pakistan's first ever gold medal in Javelin Throw at the Commonwealth Games and the first Athletics gold medal since 1962. Pakistan won a total of seven medals, including two golds, three silvers and two bronze medals, which was its best medal haul at the Commonwealth Games since 1970. Overall Pakistan finished at 18 on the medal table out of 72 participating nations.

== Administration ==
Syed Mohammad Abid Qadri was the Chef de Mission for the Pakistani team in Birmingham.

== Competitors ==
The following is the list of number of competitors participating at the Games per sport/discipline.

Sport	Men	Women	Total
Athletics	3	2	5
Badminton	2	2	4
Boxing	3 (Note: One boxer failed to make the draw and thus no longer counted.)	1	4
Cricket	—N/a	15	15
Hockey	18	0	18
Gymnastics	1	0	1
Judo	2	0	2
Squash	2	2	4
Swimming	1	3	4
Table tennis	1	0	1
Weightlifting	3	0	3
Wrestling	6	0	6
Total	42	25	67

== Medallists ==
Medals by date
Day	Date	Gold medal	Silver medal	Bronze medal	Total
Day 1	29 Jul	0	0	0	0
Day 2	30 Jul	0	0	0	0
Day 3	31 Jul	0	0	0	0
Day 4	1 Aug	0	0	0	0
Day 5	2 Aug	0	0	0	0
Day 6	3 Aug	1	0	1	2
Day 7	4 Aug	0	0	0	0
Day 8	5 Aug	0	2	1	3
Day 9	6 Aug	0	1	0	1
Day 10	7 Aug	1	0	0	1
Day 11	8 Aug	0	0	0	0
Total		2	3	2	7

Medals by gender
Gender	1st place, gold medalist(s)	2nd place, silver medalist(s)	3rd place, bronze medalist(s)	Total
Male	2	3	2	7
Female	0	0	0	0
Mixed	0	0	0	0
Total	2	3	2	7

Medals by sport
Sport	1st place, gold medalist(s)	2nd place, silver medalist(s)	3rd place, bronze medalist(s)	Total
Athletics	1	0	0	1
Weightlifting	1	0	0	1
Wrestling	0	3	1	4
Judo	0	0	1	1
Total	2	3	2	7

Medal	Name	Sport	Event	Date
Gold	Nooh Dastgir Butt	Weightlifting	Men's +109kg	3 August
Gold	Arshad Nadeem	Athletics	Javelin throw	7 August
Silver	Muhammad Inam	Wrestling	Men's -86kg	5 August
Silver	Zaman Anwar	Wrestling	Men's -125kg	5 August
Silver	Sharif Tahir	Wrestling	Men's -74kg	6 August
Bronze	Shah Hussain Shah	Judo	Men's -90kg	3 August
Bronze	Inayat Ullah	Wrestling	Men's -65kg	5 August

== Athletics ==
A squad of five athletes was officially confirmed as of 19 July 2022.

Men
Track and road events

Athlete	Event	Heat		Semifinal		Final	
Athlete	Event	Result	Rank	Result	Rank	Result	Rank
Shajar Abbas	100 m	10.38	4	Did not advance			
Shajar Abbas	200 m	21.12	1 Q	20.89	8 q	21.16	8

Field events

Athlete	Event	Final	
Athlete	Event	Distance	Rank
Jamshad Ali	Shot put	15.72	11
Arshad Nadeem	Javelin throw	90.18	1st place, gold medalist(s)

Women
Track and road events

Athlete	Event	Heat		Semifinal		Final	
Athlete	Event	Result	Rank	Result	Rank	Result	Rank
Aneela Gulzar	100 m	14.01	8	Did not advance			

Field events

Athlete	Event	Final	
Athlete	Event	Distance	Rank
Anila Baig	Discus throw F44/64	20.69	10

== Badminton ==
Pakistan received a Bipartite Invitation for the mixed team competition. A squad of four players was selected shortly after the selection trials on 12 May 2022.

Athlete	Event	Round of 64	Round of 32	Round of 16	Quarterfinal	Semifinal	Final / BM	
Athlete	Event	Opposition Score	Opposition Score	Opposition Score	Opposition Score	Opposition Score	Opposition Score	Rank
Murad Ali	Men's singles	Tamakloe (GHA); W (21–9, 21–8)	Teh (SGP); L (14–21, 16–21)	Did not advance				
Muhammad Irfan Saeed Bhatti	Men's singles	Mulenga (ZAM); W (21–6, 21–19)	Ng (MAS); L (10–21, 9–21)	Did not advance				
Mahoor Shahzad	Women's singles	P Ramdhani (GUY); W (21–10, 21–8)	Kashyap (IND); L (20–22, 1–8 ret.)	Did not advance				
Ghazala Siddique	Women's singles	Chater (FLK); W (21–4, 21–3)	Richardson (JAM); L (15–21, 14–21)	Did not advance				
Murad Ali; Muhammad Irfan Saeed Bhatti	Men's doubles	—N/a	Elliott & Summers (RSA); W (21–19, 21–17)	Rankireddy & Shetty (IND); L (8–21, 7–21)	Did not advance			
Mahoor Shahzad; Ghazala Siddique	Women's doubles	—N/a	Chen & Somerville (AUS); L (10–21, 13–21)	Did not advance				

Mixed team

Summary

Team	Event	Group stage				Quarterfinal	Semifinal	Final / BM	
Team	Event	Opposition Score	Opposition Score	Opposition Score	Rank	Opposition Score	Opposition Score	Opposition Score	Rank
Pakistan	Mixed team	India; L 0–5	Australia; L 2–3	Sri Lanka; L 1–4	4	Did not advance			

Squad

- Murad Ali
- Muhammad Irfan Saeed Bhatti
- Mahoor Shahzad
- Ghazala Siddique

Group stage

Pos	Team	Pld	W	L	MF	MA	MD	GF	GA	GD	PF	PA	PD	Pts	Qualification
1	India	3	3	0	14	1	+13	28	2	+26	620	329	+291	3	Knockout stage
2	Sri Lanka	3	2	1	7	8	−1	14	16	−2	489	520	−31	2	Knockout stage
3	Australia	3	1	2	6	9	−3	12	18	−6	514	546	−32	1	
4	Pakistan	3	0	3	3	12	−9	6	24	−18	382	610	−228	0	

Source: BWF

India
5
National Exhibition Centre, Court 2
29 July 2022, 14:00 UTC+1

Pakistan
0

			1	2	3
1	(India) (Pakistan)	B. Sumeeth Reddy / Ashwini Ponnappa; Muhammad Irfan Saeed Bhatti / Ghazala Siddique	21; 9	21; 12
2	(India) (Pakistan)	Srikanth Kidambi; Murad Ali	21; 7	21; 12
3	(India) (Pakistan)	P. V. Sindhu; Mahoor Shahzad	21; 7	21; 6
4	(India) (Pakistan)	Satwiksairaj Rankireddy / Chirag Shetty; Murad Ali / Muhammad Irfan Saeed Bhatti	21; 12	21; 9
5	(India) (Pakistan)	Treesa Jolly / Gayatri Gopichand; Mahoor Shahzad / Ghazala Siddique	21; 4	21; 5

Australia
3
National Exhibition Centre, Court 1
30 July 2022, 09:00 UTC+1

Pakistan
2

			1	2	3
1	(Australia) (Pakistan)	Jack Yu / Kaitlyn Ea; Murad Ali / Ghazala Siddique	21; 17	21; 17
2	(Australia) (Pakistan)	Jacob Schueler; Muhammad Irfan Saeed Bhatti	18; 21	16; 21
3	(Australia) (Pakistan)	Tiffany Ho; Mahoor Shahzad	18; 21	19; 21
4	(Australia) (Pakistan)	Tran Hoang Pham / Jack Yu; Murad Ali / Muhammad Irfan Saeed Bhatti	21; 11	21; 19
5	(Australia) (Pakistan)	Angela Yu / Kaitlyn Ea; Mahoor Shahzad / Ghazala Siddique	21; 11	21; 6

Sri Lanka
4
National Exhibition Centre, Court 3
30 July 2022, 19:00 UTC+1

Pakistan
1

			1	2	3
1	(Sri Lanka) (Pakistan)	Sachin Dias / Thilini Hendahewa; Muhammad Irfan Saeed Bhatti / Ghazala Siddique	21; 9	21; 11
2	(Sri Lanka) (Pakistan)	Niluka Karunaratne; Murad Ali	21; 9	21; 11
3	(Sri Lanka) (Pakistan)	Suhasni Vidanage; Mahoor Shahzad	20; 22	15; 21
4	(Sri Lanka) (Pakistan)	Sachin Dias / Niluka Karunaratne; Mahoor Shahzad / Muhammad Irfan Saeed Bhatti	21; 15	21; 13
5	(Sri Lanka) (Pakistan)	Thilini Hendahewa / Suhasni Vidanage; Murad Ali / Ghazala Siddique	21; 15	21; 8

== Boxing ==
A squad of five boxers was officially confirmed as of 19 July 2022.

Athlete	Event	Round of 32	Round of 16	Quarterfinals	Semifinals	Final	
Athlete	Event	Opposition Result	Opposition Result	Opposition Result	Opposition Result	Opposition Result	Rank
Zohaib Rasheed	Men's Flyweight	—N/a	Failed to enter draw due to mistake by a technical delegate				
Ilyas Hussain	Men's Featherweight	(Lesotho) M. Mokhotho W RSC	(Trinidad and Tobago) A. Joseph W 3–2	(Northern Ireland) J. Gallagher L 0–5	Did not advance		
Suleman Baloch	Men's Light welterweight	(India) S.Thapa; L 0–5	Did not advance				
Nazeer Ullah Khan	Men's Heavyweight	—N/a	(England) L. Williams; L 0–5	Did not advance			
Mehreen Baloch	Women's Featherweight	—N/a	(Sri Lanka) S. Muthuthanthri L 0–5	Did not advance			

== Cricket ==
By virtue of its position in the ICC Women's T20I rankings (as of 1 April 2021), Pakistan qualified for the tournament.

Fixtures were announced in November 2021.

Roster

Fifteen players were selected on 31 May 2022.

- Bismah Maroof (c)
- Muneeba Ali (wk)
- Anam Amin
- Aiman Anwer
- Diana Baig
- Nida Dar
- Gull Feroza (wk)
- Tuba Hassan
- Kainat Imtiaz
- Sadia Iqbal
- Iram Javed
- Ayesha Naseem
- Aliya Riaz
- Fatima Sana
- Omaima Sohail

Summary

Team	Event	Group stage				Semifinal	Final / BM	
Team	Event	Opposition Result	Opposition Result	Opposition Result	Rank	Opposition Result	Opposition Result	Rank
Pakistan women	Women's tournament	Barbados; L 15 Runs	India; L 8 Wickets	Australia; L 44 Runs	4	Did not advance		

Group play

Pos	Team	Pld	W	L	NR	Pts	NRR
1	Australia	3	3	0	0	6	2.832
2	India	3	2	1	0	4	2.511
3	Barbados	3	1	2	0	2	−2.953
4	Pakistan	3	0	3	0	0	−1.768

Source: ESPNcricinfo

29 July 2022
18:00 (D/N)
Scorecard

Barbados; 144/4 (20 overs)	v	Pakistan; 129/6 (20 overs)
Kycia Knight 62* (56); Fatima Sana 2/41 (4 overs)		Nida Dar 50* (31); Hayley Matthews 1/13 (4 overs)

Barbados won by 15 runs
Edgbaston, Birmingham
Umpires: Kim Cotton (NZ) and Shivani Mishra (Qat)
Player of the match: Hayley Matthews (Bar)

- Pakistan won the toss and elected to field.
- Shanika Bruce, Trishan Holder, Alisa Scantlebury and Aaliyah Williams (Bar) all made their WT20I debuts. (Note: Aaliyah Alleyne, Shamilia Connell, Deandra Dottin, Kycia Knight, Kyshona Knight, Hayley Matthews and Shakera Selman – all capped in WT20Is for the West Indies – also made their WT20I debuts for Barbados.)

31 July 2022
11:00
Scorecard

Pakistan; 99 (18 overs)	v	India; 102/2 (11.4 overs)
Muneeba Ali 32 (30); Sneh Rana 2/15 (4 overs)		Smriti Mandhana 63* (42); Tuba Hassan 1/18 (2 overs)

India won by 8 wickets
Edgbaston, Birmingham
Umpires: Lauren Agenbag (SA) and Kim Cotton (NZ)
Player of the match: Smriti Mandhana (Ind)

- Pakistan won the toss and elected to bat.
- The match was reduced to 18 overs per side due to rain.

3 August 2022
11:00
Scorecard

Australia; 160/2 (20 overs)	v	Pakistan; 116/8 (20 overs)
Tahlia McGrath 78* (51); Sadia Iqbal 1/28 (4 overs)		Fatima Sana 35* (26); Tahlia McGrath 3/13 (3 overs)

Australia won by 44 runs
Edgbaston, Birmingham
Umpires: Lauren Agenbag (SA) and Sue Redfern (Eng)
Player of the match: Tahlia McGrath (Aus)

- Australia won the toss and elected to bat.

== Gymnastics ==
One gymnast was officially selected as of 19 July 2022.

=== Artistic ===
Men
Individual Qualification

Athlete	Event	Apparatus						Total	Rank
Athlete	Event	F	PH	R	V	PB	HB	Total	Rank
Mohammad Afzal	Qualification	8.400	—N/a	4.250	10.550	—N/a			

== Hockey ==
By virtue of its position in the FIH Men's World Ranking (as of 1 February 2022), Pakistan qualified for the men's tournament.

Detailed fixtures were released on 9 March 2022. Eighteen players were selected for the men's squad as of 13 July 2022.

=== Men's tournament ===
Summary

Key:

- FT = After full time
- P = Match decided by penalty-shootout

Team	Event	Preliminary round					Semifinal	Final / BM / PM	
Team	Event	Opposition Result	Opposition Result	Opposition Result	Opposition Result	Rank	Opposition Result	Opposition Result	Rank
Pakistan men	Men's tournament	South Africa; D 2-2	New Zealand; L 1–4	Scotland; W 3–2	Australia; L 0-7	4	Did not advance	Canada; W 4–3	7

Roster

- Akmal Hussain (gk)
- Abdullah Ishtiaq (gk)
- Mubashir Ali
- Ammad Butt
- Mohammad Hammad
- Muhammad Abdullah
- Rizwan Ali
- Muhammad Umar Bhutta
- Moin Shakeel
- Abdul Mannan
- Junaid Manzoor
- Ghazanfar Ali
- Ajaz Ahmed
- Rana Waheed
- Ruman Khan
- Afraz Hakeem
- Hannan Shahid
- Ahmed Nadeem

Group play

Pos	Team	Pld	W	D	L	GF	GA	GD	Pts	Qualification
1	Australia	4	4	0	0	29	2	+27	12	Semi-finals
2	South Africa	4	2	1	1	11	12	−1	7	Semi-finals
3	New Zealand	4	1	1	2	14	17	−3	4	Fifth place match
4	Pakistan	4	1	1	2	6	15	−9	4	Seventh place match
5	Scotland	4	0	1	3	11	25	−14	1	Ninth place match

Source: Birmingham 2022
Rules for classification: 1) points; 2) number of wins; 3) goal difference; 4) goals scored; 5) head-to-head results.

30 July 2022
09:00

South Africa	2–2	Pakistan
Beauchamp 14'; Guise-Brown 54'	Report	R. Ali 25'; Hakeem 60'

Umpires:
Nick Bennett (ENG)
Bruce Bale (ENG)

31 July 2022
09:00

New Zealand	4–1	Pakistan
Inglis 17', 18'; Thomas 43'; Lane 60'	Report	G. Ali 26'

Umpires:
Dan Barstow (ENG)
Tyler Klenk (CAN)

3 August 2022
19:00

Pakistan	3–2	Scotland
Hakeem 22'; Shahid 23'; Khan 55'	Report	C. Golden 9'; Walker 38'

Umpires:
Tyler Klenk (CAN)
Sean Rapaport (RSA)

4 August 2022
21:00

Australia	7–0	Pakistan
Govers 12'; Hayward 19', 40'; Wickham 42', 48'; Anderson 53'; Ephramus 59'	Report

Umpires:
Peter Kabaso (KEN)
David Tomlinson (NZL)

Seventh place match

6 August 2022
11:15

Pakistan	4–3	Canada
Rana 24'; Ali 25'; Umar Bhutta 52'; Shahid 60'	Report	Sarmento 26', 58'; Pereira 30'

Umpires:
Fraser Bell (SCO)
Tim Bond (NZL)

== Judo ==
Two judoka were selected for the competition.

Men

Athlete	Event	Round of 16	Quarterfinals	Semifinals	Repechage	Final/BM	
Athlete	Event	Opposition Result	Opposition Result	Opposition Result	Opposition Result	Opposition Result	Rank
Shah Hussain Shah	-90 kg	—N/a	Harrison Cassar (AUS); L	Did not advance		Thomas-Laszlo Breytenbach (RSA); W	3rd place, bronze medalist(s)
Qaisar Khan	-100 kg	Jason Koster (NZL); L	Did not advance				

== Squash ==
A squad of four players was officially confirmed as of 19 July 2022.

Singles

Athlete	Event	Round of 64	Round of 32	Round of 16	Quarterfinals	Semifinals	Final	
Athlete	Event	Opposition Score	Opposition Score	Opposition Score	Opposition Score	Opposition Score	Opposition Score	Rank
Tayyab Aslam	Men's singles	Bye	Iqbal (PAK); L 0-1 ret	Did not advance				
Nasir Iqbal	Men's singles	Morrison (JAM); W 3–0	Aslam (PAK); W 1-0 ret	Willstrop (ENG); L 0–3	Did not advance			
Amna Fayyaz	Women's singles	Bye	Arnold (MAS); L 0–3	Did not advance				
Faiza Zafar	Women's singles	Bye	Yiwen (MAS); L 0–3	Did not advance				

Doubles

Athlete	Event	Round of 32	Round of 16	Quarterfinals	Semifinals	Final	
Athlete	Event	Opposition Score	Opposition Score	Opposition Score	Opposition Score	Opposition Score	Rank
Tayyab Aslam; Nasir Iqbal	Men's doubles	Ghana; W 2–0	Scotland; L 1–2	Did not advance			
Faiza Zafar; Amna Fayyaz	Women's doubles	Bye	Malaysia; L 0–2	Did not advance			
Tayyab Aslam; Amna Fayyaz	Mixed doubles	Barbados; L 0–2	Did not advance				
Nasir Iqbal; Faiza Zafar	Mixed doubles	Sri Lanka; W 2–0	New Zealand; L 0–2	Did not advance			

== Swimming ==
A squad of four swimmers was officially confirmed as of 19 July 2022.

Men

Athlete	Event	Heat		Semifinal		Final	
Athlete	Event	Time	Rank	Time	Rank	Time	Rank
Haseeb Tariq	50 m freestyle	24.65	43	Did not advance			
Haseeb Tariq	50 m backstroke	27.89	31	Did not advance			
Haseeb Tariq	50 m butterfly	25.97	35	Did not advance			

Women

Athlete	Event	Heat		Semifinal		Final	
Athlete	Event	Time	Rank	Time	Rank	Time	Rank
Bisma Khan	50 m freestyle	27.82	38	Did not advance			
Bisma Khan	100 m freestyle	1:02.59	47	Did not advance			
Bisma Khan	50 m butterfly	29.43	33	Did not advance			
Bisma Khan	100 m butterfly	1:08.21	31	Did not advance			
Jehanara Nabi	100 m freestyle	1:01.51	40	Did not advance			
Jehanara Nabi	200 m freestyle	2:13.38	22	—N/a		Did not advance	
Jehanara Nabi	400 m freestyle	4:36.87	17	—N/a		Did not advance	
Mishael Ayub	50 m breaststroke	37.96	31	Did not advance			
Mishael Ayub	100 m breaststroke	1:22.12	26	Did not advance			
Mishael Ayub	50 m butterfly	31.44	46	Did not advance			

== Table tennis ==
Four players were initially selected on 16 March 2022; it was later confirmed on 13 May 2022 that only one player (Fahad Khawaja) would go to the Games.

Athletes	Event	Group stage				Round of 32	Round of 16	Quarterfinal	Semifinal	Final / BM	
Athletes	Event	Opposition Score	Opposition Score	Opposition Score	Rank	Opposition Score	Opposition Score	Opposition Score	Opposition Score	Opposition Score	Rank
Fahad Khawaja	Men's singles	(Guyana) C. Franklin W 4–0	(Bangladesh) M. Ridoy W 4–1	(Trinidad and Tobago) D. Douglas W 4–0	1	(England) P. Drinkhall L 0–4	Did not advance				

== Weightlifting ==
The PWF was set to send six qualified weightlifters to Birmingham but a doping scandal means that only three are provisionally set to attend the Games.

Men

Athlete	Event	Snatch		Clean & jerk		Total	Rank
Athlete	Event	Result	Rank	Result	Rank	Total	Rank
Haider Ali	81 kg	135	7	170	5	305	5
Hanzala Dastgir Butt	109 kg	142	9	173	9	315	9
Nooh Dastgir Butt	+109 kg	173 GR	1	232 GR	1	405 GR	1st place, gold medalist(s)

== Wrestling ==
Following the trials, five male wrestlers were selected on 2 April 2022, with a sixth added to the squad at a later date.

Key:

- VT - Victory by Fall.
- PP - Decision by Points - the loser with technical points.
- PO - Decision by Points - the loser without technical points.

Athlete	Event	Round of 16	Quarterfinal	Semifinal	Repechage	Final / BM	
Athlete	Event	Opposition Result	Opposition Result	Opposition Result	Opposition Result	Opposition Result	Rank
Ali Asad	Men's -57 kg	(England) H. Ridings W 10-0 (VSU)	(Namibia) R. Goliath W 10-0 (VSU)	(India) K. Ravi L 4-14 (VSU1)	—N/a	(New Zealand) S. Singh W 11-0 (VSU)	DSQ
Inayat Ullah	Men's -65 kg	(Malta) A. Vella W 10-0 (VSU)	(Nigeria) A. Daniel W 4-0 (VPO)	(Canada) L. McNeil L 0-11 (VSU)	—N/a	(Scotland) R. Connelly W10-0 (VSU)	3rd place, bronze medalist(s)
Sharif Tahir	Men's -74 kg	(Tonga) J. Vake W11-0 (VSU)	(Canada) J. Phulka W5-1 (VPO1)	(New Zealand) C. Hawkins W11-0 (VSU)	—N/a	(India) N. Naveen L0-9 (VPO)	2nd place, silver medalist(s)
Muhammad Inam	Men's -86 kg	(Scotland) K. Malone W 11-0 (VSU)	(Australia) J. Lawerence W 8-3 (VPO)	(South Africa) E. Lessing W 5-3 (VPO)	—N/a	(India) D. Punia L 0-3 (VPO)	2nd place, silver medalist(s)
Tayab Raza	Men's -97 kg	(The Bahamas) R. Mackey W10-0 (VSU)	(Scotland) C. Nicol W10-0 (VSU)	(Canada) N. Randhawa L0-7 (VPO)	—N/a	(India) D. Nehra L2-10 (VPO1)	4
Zaman Anwar	Men's -125 kg	Bye	(Mauritius) K. Marie W 12-0 (VFA)	(England) M. Kooner W 5-0 (VFA)	—N/a	(Canada) A. Dhesi L 2-9 (VFA)	2nd place, silver medalist(s)

== Doping ==
=== Disqualified medal ===
Ali Asad was stripped of his medal due to testing positive for performance enhancement drugs.

Medal	Name	Sport	Event	Date
Bronze	Ali Asad	Wrestling	Men's -57 kg	August 6, 2022

== See also ==
- Pakistan at the 2022 Winter Olympics
- Pakistan at the 2022 Asian Games
