= Wrestling at the 2014 Commonwealth Games – Men's freestyle 57 kg =

Wrestling – Men's freestyle 57 kg at the 2014 Commonwealth Games
- Venue: Scottish Exhibition and Conference Centre
- Dates: 29 July 2014
- Competitors: 11 from 10 nations

Medalists
gold medal	Amit Kumar Dahiya	India
silver medal	Ebikewenimo Welson	Nigeria
bronze medal	Craig Pilling	Wales
bronze medal	Azhar Hussain	Pakistan

The men's 57 kg freestyle wrestling competitions at the 2014 Commonwealth Games in Glasgow, Scotland was held on 29 July at the Scottish Exhibition and Conference Centre.

This freestyle wrestling competition consists of a single-elimination tournament, with a repechage used to determine the winner of two bronze medals. The two finalists face off for gold and silver medals. Each wrestler who loses to one of the two finalists moves into the repechage, culminating in a pair of bronze medal matches featuring the semifinal losers each facing the remaining repechage opponent from their half of the bracket.

== Results ==
Legend

- F — Won by fall

=== Main bracket ===
Round of 16
Amit Kumar Dahiya (IND)	5^{F}
Jean Bandoo (MRI)	0
Azhar Hussain (PAK)	10
Gayan Kathurangana (SRI)	0
Brian Harper (SCO)	0
Shane Parker (AUS)	10

Quarterfinals
Craig Pilling (WAL)	9
Ross McFarlane (SCO)	0
Omar Tafail (ENG)	0
Ebikewenimo Welson (NGR)	10
Bokang Masunyane (RSA)	0
Amit Kumar Dahiya (IND)	10
Azhar Hussain (PAK)	12
Shane Parker (AUS)	2

Semifinals
Craig Pilling (WAL)	0
Ebikewenimo Welson (NGR)	10
Amit Kumar Dahiya (IND)	10
Azhar Hussain (PAK)	0

Final
Ebikewenimo Welson (NGR)	2
Amit Kumar Dahiya (IND)	6

=== Repechage ===
Repechage first round
Jean Bandoo (MRI)	1
Bokang Masunyane (RSA)	12

Bronze medal match
Omar Tafail (ENG)	5
Craig Pilling (WAL)	8
Bokang Masunyane (RSA)	1
Azhar Hussain (PAK)	11
