= Pakistan at the 1990 Commonwealth Games =

- CG code: PAK
- CGA: Pakistan Olympic Association
- Website: nocpakistan.org

in Auckland, New Zealand
- Medals: Gold 0 Silver 0 Bronze 0 Total 0

Commonwealth Games appearances (overview)
- 1954; 1958; 1962; 1966; 1970; 1974–1986; 1990; 1994; 1998; 2002; 2006; 2010; 2014; 2018; 2022; 2026; 2030

Pakistan participated at the 1990 Commonwealth Games in Auckland, New Zealand after a hiatus of 20 years. It failed to win any medal at these games; the only time it has returned empty handed from the Commonwealth Games.
