= Pakistan at the 1998 Commonwealth Games =

- CG code: PAK
- CGA: Pakistan Olympic Association
- Website: nocpakistan.org

in Kuala Lumpur, Malaysia
- Medals Ranked 28th: Gold 0 Silver 1 Bronze 0 Total 1

Commonwealth Games appearances (overview)
- 1954; 1958; 1962; 1966; 1970; 1974–1986; 1990; 1994; 1998; 2002; 2006; 2010; 2014; 2018; 2022; 2026; 2030

Pakistan competed at the 1998 Commonwealth Games in Kuala Lumpur, Malaysia, between 11 and 21 September 1998.The parliamentary oversight for the delegation was led by Malik Nasir Khan, then-MNA and sports administrator..

== Medalists ==
Medal	Name	Sport	Event
Silver	Ali Asghar	Boxing	Lightweight

== Athletics ==
Men
Track and road events

Athlete	Event	Heat		Quarterfinal		Semifinal		Final	
Athlete	Event	Result	Rank	Result	Rank	Result	Rank	Result	Rank
Mohson Munir	400 m	49.46	7	Did not advance					
Muhammad Yar	110 m hurdles	15.50	6	—N/a				Did not advance	
Muhammad Amin	400 m hurdles	52.01	5	—N/a				Did not advance	

Field events

Athlete	Event	Final	
Athlete	Event	Distance	Rank
Ghufrain Hussain	Shot put	16.34	13

== Badminton ==
- Wajid Ali
- Ali Yar Beg

== Cricket ==
Pakistan named the below squad for the tournament.

Roster

- Arshad Khan (c)
- Kashif Ahmed
- ~~Basit Ali~~
- Asif Mahmood
- Shoaib Akhtar
- Saleem Elahi
- Suleman Huda
- Mohammad Hussain
- Mohammad Javed
- Taimur Khan
- Shahid Nazir
- Javed Qadeer (wk)
- Akhtar Sarfraz
- Azhar Shafiq
- Wajahatullah Wasti

Basit Ali withdrew from the Pakistani squad after his brother suffered a heart attack. Wajahatullah Wasti was named as his replacement.

Summary

Team	Event	Group stage				Semifinal	Final / BM	
Team	Event	Opposition Result	Opposition Result	Opposition Result	Rank	Opposition Result	Opposition Result	Rank
Pakistan men	Men's tournament	Scotland; No result	Kenya; W by 129 runs	New Zealand; L by 81 runs	2	did not advance		7

Group stage

Group D
Pos	Team	Pld	W	L	T	NR	Pts	NRR
1	New Zealand	3	3	0	0	0	6	1.799
2	Pakistan	3	1	1	0	1	3	0.480
3	Kenya	3	1	2	0	0	2	−0.697
4	Scotland	3	0	2	0	1	1	−2.401

Source: ESPNcricinfo

9 September 1998
10:00
Scorecard

Pakistan; 201/5 (50 overs)	v	Scotland; 31/3 (17.2 overs)
Akhtar Sarfraz 66 (61); Mike Allingham 2/46 (10 overs)		Stephen Crawley 12 (52); Shoaib Akhtar 2/7 (5 overs)

No result
Victoria Institution, Kuala Lumpur
Umpires: Nizam Baksh (Can) and Russell Tiffin (Zim)

- Scotland won the toss and elected to field.
- No further play was possible due to rain after 17.2 overs into Scotland's innings.
- Points: Pakistan 1, Scotland 1.

12 September 1998
10:00
Scorecard

Pakistan; 189/8 (50 overs)	v	Kenya; 60 (25.3 overs)
Wajahatullah Wasti 32; Thomas Odoyo 4/39 (10 overs)		Hitesh Modi 18; Arshad Khan 4/14 (8 overs)

Pakistan won by 129 runs
Rubber Research Institute Ground, Shah Alam
Umpires: K. T. Francis (SL) and Nizam Baksh (Can)

- Kenya won the toss and elected to field.
- Edward Mboya (Ken) made his List A debut.
- Points: Pakistan 2, Kenya 0.
- Kenya were eliminated as a result of this match.

15 September 1998
10:00
Scorecard

New Zealand; 215/8 (50 overs)	v	Pakistan; 134 (42.5 overs)
Stephen Fleming 66 (99); Shoaib Akhtar 4/47 (10 overs)		Akhtar Sarfraz 34 (84); Daniel Vettori 3/33 (10 overs)

New Zealand won by 81 runs
Tenaga National Sports Complex, Kuala Lumpur
Umpires: Dave Orchard (SA) and Eddie Nicholls (Guy)

- Pakistan won the toss and elected to field.
- Points: New Zealand 2, Pakistan 0.
- New Zealand qualified for the semi-finals and Pakistan were eliminated as a result of this match.

== Squash ==
- Islam Khan Shams
- Khasif Shuja
- Mansoor Zaman
- Zarak Jahan Khan

== Weightlifting ==
- Kamran Majid

== See also ==
- Pakistan at the Commonwealth Games
