= Pakistan at the 2026 Commonwealth Games =

- Flag of Pakistan
- CG code: PAK
- CGA: National Olympic Committee of Pakistan
- Website: nocpakistan.org

in Glasgow, Scotland 23 July 2026 – 2 August 2026
- Competitors: 21 in 6 sports
- Flag bearer (opening): Arshad Nadeem
- Baton bearer: Fatima Zahra
- Flag bearer (closing): Fatima Zahra
- Medals Ranked 36th: Gold 0 Silver 0 Bronze 1 Total 1

Commonwealth Games appearances (overview)
- 1954; 1958; 1962; 1966; 1970; 1974–1986; 1990; 1994; 1998; 2002; 2006; 2010; 2014; 2018; 2022; 2026; 2030

Pakistan competed at the 2026 Commonwealth Games in Glasgow, Scotland. This was Pakistan's 15th participation at the games, after making its debut at the 1954 Commonwealth Games.

The King's Baton relay stopped in Pakistan in December 2025. The Pakistani delegation consisted of 21 athletes competing in six sports.

Javelin thrower Arshad Nadeem was the country's flagbearer during the opening ceremony. Meanwhile, boxer Fatima Zahra was the baton bearer during the opening ceremony.

Zahra would win Pakistan's only medal at the games, a bronze in the women's 60kg boxing event. This marked Pakistan's worst performance at the Commonwealth Games in 36 years. Zahra as the only medalist, served as the country's closing ceremony flagbearer. She became Pakistan's first female Commonwealth Games medalist and the first Pakistani woman to win a boxing medal at the Commonwealth Games.

== Competitors ==
The following is the list of number of competitors participating at the Games per sport/discipline.

| Sport | Men | Women | Total |
|---|---|---|---|
| Artistic gymnastics | 1 | 0 | 1 |
| Athletics | 5 | 3 | 8 |
| Bowls | 2 | 0 | 2 |
| Boxing | 3 | 2 | 5 |
| Judo | 1 | 0 | 1 |
| Swimming | 2 | 2 | 4 |
| Total | 14 | 7 | 21 |

== Medallist ==
The following Pakistani competitor a won medal at the games.

| Medal | Name | Sport | Event | Date | Ref. |
|---|---|---|---|---|---|
| Bronze | Fatima Zahra | Boxing | Women's 60 kg | 31 July | |

== Artistic gymnastics ==
Pakistan entered one male artistic gymnast.

| Athlete | Qualification | | | | | | | | Final | | | | | | | |
| Athlete | Apparatus | | | | | | Total | Rank | Apparatus | | | | | | Total | Rank |
| Athlete | F | PH | R | V | PB | HB | Total | Rank | F | PH | R | V | PB | HB | Total | Rank |
|---|---|---|---|---|---|---|---|---|---|---|---|---|---|---|---|---|
| Shahzad Ali | —N/a | 2.500 | 3.200 | —N/a | 8.300 | —N/a | | | Did not advance | | | | | | | |

== Athletics ==
Pakistan selected eight athletes, five men and three women, for the 2026 Commonwealth Games.

Key

Ranks given for track events are within the athlete's heat only.

- Q = Qualified for the next round
- q = Qualified for the next round as a fastest loser or, in field events, by position without achieving the qualifying target

Track

| Athlete | Event | Heat | | Semifinal | | Final | |
| Athlete | Event | Result | Rank | Result | Rank | Result | Rank |
|---|---|---|---|---|---|---|---|
| Muhammad Akhtar | Men's 5000 metres | —N/a | | | | 14:50.95 | 22 |
| Muhammad Ismail | Men's 400 metres | 50.60 | 41 | Did not advance | | | |
| Faiqa Riaz | Women's 100 metres | 11.64 | 21 | Did not advance | | | |

Field

| Athlete | Event | Qualification | | Final | |
| Athlete | Event | Distance | Rank | Distance | Rank |
|---|---|---|---|---|---|
| Arshad Nadeem | Men's javelin throw | 78.63 | 7 q | 77.41 | 9 |
| Muhammad Yasir | Men's javelin throw | 74.36 | 14 | Did not advance | |
| Ansar Abbas | Men's long jump | 7.06 SB | 18 | Did not advance | |
| Feryal Farooq | Women's discus throw | —N/a | | 38.66 | 8 |
| Noreen Hussain | Women's pole vault | —N/a | | NM | |

== Bowls ==
Pakistan selected a team of two male bowlers.

| Athlete | Event | Group Stage | | | | | | Quarterfinal | Semifinal | Final / BM | |
| Athlete | Event | Opposition Score | Opposition Score | Opposition Score | Opposition Score | Opposition Score | Rank | Opposition Score | Opposition Score | Opposition Score | Rank |
|---|---|---|---|---|---|---|---|---|---|---|---|
| Mohammed Qureshi | Singles | Owen (WAL); L 0–2 | Banks (SCO); L 0–2 | Tolchard (ENG); L 0–2 | Prasad (FIJ); W 2–0 | Simpson (JAM); W 2–0 | 5 | Did not advance | | | |
| Maqsood Wasim Khan; Mohammed Qureshi | Pairs | Australia; L 0–2 | Northern Ireland; L 0–2 | Fiji; L 1–1* | New Zealand; L 0–2 | Tonga; L 0–2 | 6 | Did not advance | | | |

== Boxing ==
Pakistan selected a team of five boxers for the Games, three men and two women.

| Athlete | Event | Round of 32 | Round of 16 | Quarterfinals | Semifinals | Final | |
| Athlete | Event | Opposition Result | Opposition Result | Opposition Result | Opposition Result | Opposition Result | Rank |
|---|---|---|---|---|---|---|---|
| Sumama Rahman | Men's 55 kg | Bye | Singh (IND); L 0–5 | Did not advance | | | |
| Qudrat Ullah | Men's 60 kg | Davule (FIJ); W 5–0 | Jude Gallagher (NIR); L 0–4 | Did not advance | | | |
| Afzal Khan | Men's 65 kg | Bouzin (SEY); W 5–0 | Labrie (CAN); L 0–5 | Did not advance | | | |
| Malaika Zahid | Women's 54 kg | Bye | Mwape (ZAM); L 1–4 | Did not advance | | | |
| Fatima Zahra | Women's 60 kg | —N/a | Segoete (LES); W RSC | Wilson (NZL); W 5–0 | Al-Ahmadieh (CAN); L RSC | Did not advance | 3rd place, bronze medalist(s) |

== Judo ==
Pakistan entered one male judoka.

| Athlete | Event | Round of 16 | Quarterfinals | Semifinals | Repechage | Final/BM | |
| Athlete | Event | Opposition Result | Opposition Result | Opposition Result | Opposition Result | Opposition Result | Rank |
|---|---|---|---|---|---|---|---|
| Shah Hussain Shah | Men's +100 kg | Bessong (CAN); L 0s3–100s2 | Did not advance | | | | |

== Swimming ==
Pakistan selected a team of four swimmers, two male and two female.

| Athlete | Event | Heat | | Semifinal | | Final | |
| Athlete | Event | Time | Rank | Time | Rank | Time | Rank |
|---|---|---|---|---|---|---|---|
| Hamza Asif | Men's 50 m freestyle | 24.17 | 39 | Did not advance | | | |
| Hamza Asif | Men's 100 m freestyle | 53.43 | 47 | Did not advance | | | |
| Hamza Asif | Men's 50 m breaststroke | 29.63 | 35 | Did not advance | | | |
| Hamza Asif | Men's 50 m butterfly | 26.09 | 46 | Did not advance | | | |
| Muhammad Ahmed Durrani | | | | Did not advance | | | |
| Muhammad Ahmed Durrani | Men's 100 m freestyle | 53.09 | 44 | Did not advance | | | |
| Muhammad Ahmed Durrani | Men's 200 m freestyle | 1:55.98 | 26 | Did not advance | | | |
| Muhammad Ahmed Durrani | Men's 400 m freestyle | 4:14.85 | 22 | —N/a | | Did not advance | |
| Muhammad Ahmed Durrani | Men's 200 m individual medley | 2:09.79 | 17 | —N/a | | Did not advance | |
Jehanara Nabi
| Jehanara Nabi | Women's 50 m butterfly | 29.99 | 40 | Did not advance | | | |
| Jehanara Nabi | Women's 100 m freestyle | 1:00.36 | 36 | Did not advance | | | |
| Jehanara Nabi | Women's 200 m freestyle | 2:11.16 | 29 | —N/a | | Did not advance | |
| Hareem Malik | Women's 50 m breaststroke | 36.52 | 24 | Did not advance | | | |
| Hareem Malik | Women's 100 m breaststroke | 1:22.51 | 27 | Did not advance | | | |
| Hareem Malik | Women's 200 m breaststroke | 3:08.84 | 15 | Did not advance | | | |
