= Pakistan at the 1970 British Commonwealth Games =

Pakistan at the 1970 Commonwealth Games
- Flag of Pakistan
- CGF code: PAK
- CGA: Pakistan Olympic Association
- Website: nocpakistan.org

in Edinburgh, Scotland
- Medals Ranked 7th: Gold 4 Silver 3 Bronze 3 Total 10

Commonwealth Games appearances (overview)
- 1954; 1958; 1962; 1966; 1970; 1974–1986; 1990; 1994; 1998; 2002; 2006; 2010; 2014; 2018; 2022; 2026; 2030

Pakistan participated at the 1970 Commonwealth Games in Edinburgh, Scotland.

== Medalists ==
| Medal | Name | Sport | Event |
|---|---|---|---|
| Gold | Muhammad Sardar | Wrestling | 57 kg |
| Gold | Muhammad Saeed | Wrestling | 62 kg |
| Gold | Faiz Muhammad | Wrestling | 90 kg |
| Gold | Ikram Ilahi | Wrestling | 100+ kg |
| Silver | Muhammad Nazir | Wrestling | 68 kg |
| Silver | Muhammad Yaqub | Wrestling | 68 kg |
| Silver | Abdul Ghafoor | Weightlifting | 52 kg |
| Bronze | Masih Sadiq | Wrestling | 48 kg |
| Bronze | Muhammad Riaz | Wrestling | 100 kg |
| Bronze | Mir Samar | Boxing | 57 kg |

== Medals by sport ==
| Sport | Gold | Silver | Bronze | Total |
|---|---|---|---|---|
| Wrestling | 4 | 2 | 2 | 8 |
| Weightlifting | 0 | 1 | 0 | 1 |
| Boxing | 0 | 0 | 1 | 1 |
| Totals (3 entries) | 4 | 3 | 3 | 10 |
