= Pakistan at the 1994 Commonwealth Games =

- CG code: PAK

in Victoria, British Columbia, Canada
- Medals Ranked 23rd: Gold 0 Silver 0 Bronze 3 Total 3

Commonwealth Games appearances (overview)
- 1954; 1958; 1962; 1966; 1970; 1974–1986; 1990; 1994; 1998; 2002; 2006; 2010; 2014; 2018; 2022; 2026; 2030

Pakistan at the 1994 Commonwealth Games was abbreviated PAK.

== Medals ==
	Gold	Silver	Bronze	Total
Pakistan	0	0	3	3

=== Gold ===
- none

=== Silver ===
- none

=== Bronze ===
- Arshad Hussain — Boxing, Men's Lightweight
- Muhammad Umar — Wrestling, Men's Lightweight
- Muhammad Bhola — Wrestling, Men's Middleweight
