= Pakistan at the 1966 British Empire and Commonwealth Games =

Pakistan at the 1966 Commonwealth Games
- Flag of Pakistan
- CGF code: PAK
- CGA: Pakistan Olympic Association
- Website: nocpakistan.org

in Kingston, Jamaica
- Medals Ranked 7th: Gold 4 Silver 1 Bronze 4 Total 9

Commonwealth Games appearances (overview)
- 1954; 1958; 1962; 1966; 1970; 1974–1986; 1990; 1994; 1998; 2002; 2006; 2010; 2014; 2018; 2022; 2026; 2030

Pakistan participated at the 1966 Commonwealth Games in Kingston, Jamaica.

== Medalists ==
Medal	Name	Sport	Event
Gold	Muhammad Nazir	Wrestling	52 kg
Gold	Muhammad Akhtar	Wrestling	62 kg
Gold	Muhammad Bashir	Wrestling	74 kg
Gold	Faiz Muhammad	Wrestling	82 kg
Silver	Ikram Ilahi	Wrestling	100 kg
Bronze	Muhammad Saeed	Wrestling	57 kg
Bronze	Ghulam Raziq	Athletics	120 yards hurdles
Bronze	Muhammad Iqbal	Athletics	Hammer throw
Bronze	Muhammad Nawaz	Athletics	Javelin throw

== Medals by sport ==
Sport	Gold	Silver	Bronze	Total
Wrestling	4	1	1	6
Athletics	0	0	3	3
Totals (2 entries)	4	1	4	9
