= Pakistan at the 2006 Commonwealth Games =

- CG code: PAK
- CGA: Pakistan Olympic Association
- Website: nocpakistan.org

in Melbourne, Australia
- Flag bearers: Opening: Closing:
- Medals Ranked 17th: Gold 1 Silver 3 Bronze 1 Total 5

Commonwealth Games appearances (overview)
- 1954; 1958; 1962; 1966; 1970; 1974–1986; 1990; 1994; 1998; 2002; 2006; 2010; 2014; 2018; 2022; 2026; 2030

Pakistan was represented at the 2006 Commonwealth Games in Melbourne by a 75-member strong contingent comprising 53 sportsmen and women, 21 officials and 1 head of the contingent.

The Pakistan team's dismal performance in the 2006 Commonwealth Games (only 5 medals, including 1 gold) drew public criticism, in view of the large contingent sent to the Games. The official-to-sportsperson ratio was among the highest of any participating team, and newspaper editorials in Pakistan have asked for accountability in expenditure of public funds.

== Medals ==
	(gold)	(silver)	(bronze)	Total
Pakistan	1	3	1	5

=== Gold ===
- Shuja-Ud-Din Malik, Weightlifting, Men's 85 kg

=== Silver ===
- Lassi Mehrullah, Boxing, Featherweight 57 kg
- Irshad Ali, Shooting, Men's 25m Standard Pistol
- Hockey, Men's Team

=== Bronze ===
- Muhammad Irfan, Weightlifting, Men's 77 kg and he is from lahore

== Pakistan's team at the 2006 Commonwealth Games ==
=== Field hockey ===
==== Men's team ====
- Salman Akbar
- Imram Warsi
- Muhammad Saqlain
- Dilawar Hussain
- Adnan Maqsood
- Tariq Aziz
- Rehan Butt
- Muhammad Shabbir
- Nasir Ahmed
- Mudassar Ali Khan
- Shakeel Abbasi
- Imran Khan Yousafzai
- Muhammad Zakir
- Muhammad Imran
- Zeeshan Ashraf
- Muhammad Zubair

Head coach: Asif Bajwa
