= Pakistan at the 2002 Commonwealth Games =

- CG code: PAK
- CGA: Pakistan Olympic Association
- Website: nocpakistan.org

in Manchester, England
- Flag bearers: Opening: Closing:
- Medals Ranked 19th: Gold 1 Silver 3 Bronze 4 Total 8

Commonwealth Games appearances (overview)
- 1954; 1958; 1962; 1966; 1970; 1974–1986; 1990; 1994; 1998; 2002; 2006; 2010; 2014; 2018; 2022; 2026; 2030

Pakistan competed in Manchester for their ninth Commonwealth Games despite being suspended from the Commonwealth three years earlier. It sent mixed teams in athletics, badminton, squash and table tennis. All male teams in boxing, cycling, hockey, judo, shooting, weightlifting and wrestling, and an all female team in swimming. In total it sent 46 males and five females. It won its only gold in Boxing, three silvers in Weightlifting and bronze medals in Hockey, Shooting and Wrestling. Finishing 19th overall in the medals table.

== Medals ==
	Gold	Silver	Bronze	Total
Pakistan	1	3	4	8

== Gold ==
Boxing:

(gold) Haider Ali Men's Featherweight Division (54kg)

== Silver ==
Weightlifting:

(silver) Muhammad Irfan Men's 69kg Clean and Jerk
(silver) Muhammad Irfan Men's 69 kg Combined
(silver) Muhammad Irfan Men's 69 k Snatch

== Bronze ==
Hockey:

(bronze) Pakistan National Field Hockey Team

Shooting:

(bronze) Irshad Ali Men's Centre Fire Pistol
(bronze) National Shooting Team Men's Centre Fire Shooting (Team)

Wrestling

(bronze) Muhammad Bashir Bhola Men's 96kg
