= Pakistan at the 1954 British Empire and Commonwealth Games =

Pakistan at the 1954 Commonwealth Games
- Flag of Pakistan
- CGF code: PAK
- CGA: Pakistan Olympic Association
- Website: nocpakistan.org

in Vancouver, Canada
- Medals Ranked 12th: Gold 1 Silver 3 Bronze 2 Total 6

Commonwealth Games appearances (overview)
- 1954; 1958; 1962; 1966; 1970; 1974–1986; 1990; 1994; 1998; 2002; 2006; 2010; 2014; 2018; 2022; 2026; 2030

Pakistan participated at the 1954 Commonwealth Games in Vancouver, Canada.

== Medalists ==
Medal	Name	Sport	Event
Gold	Muhammad Iqbal	Athletics	Hammer throw
Silver	Muhammad Nawaz	Athletics	Javelin throw
Silver	Muhammad Amin	Wrestling	57 kg
Silver	Abdul Rashid	Wrestling	74 kg
Bronze	Jalal Khan	Athletics	Javelin throw
Bronze	Muhammad Din	Wrestling	52 kg

== Medals by sport ==
Sport	Gold	Silver	Bronze	Total
Athletics	1	1	1	3
Wrestling	0	2	1	3
Totals (2 entries)	1	3	2	6
