= Muhammad Rashid (field hockey, born 1992) =

Pakistani field hockey player

Mohammad Rashid is a field hockey player from Pakistan. He was a member of Pakistani team in the 2010 Commonwealth Games in New Delhi, India.

== See also ==
Pakistan national field hockey team
