= Pakistan at the 1962 British Empire and Commonwealth Games =

- CG code: PAK
- CGA: Pakistan Olympic Association
- Website: nocpakistan.org

in Perth, Western Australia
- Flag bearers: Opening: Closing:
- Medals Ranked 4thth: Gold 8 Silver 1 Bronze 0 Total 9

British Empire and Commonwealth Games appearances
- 1954; 1958; 1962; 1966; 1970; 1974–1986; 1990; 1994; 1998; 2002; 2006; 2010; 2014; 2018; 2022; 2026; 2030

Pakistan competed at the 1962 British Empire and Commonwealth Games in Perth, Western Australia, from 22 November to 1 December 1962.

== Medalists ==
Medal	Name	Sport	Event	Date
Gold	Ghulam Raziq	Athletics	Men's 120 yards hurdles	29 November

Event		Gold
Flyweight	Men	Muhammad Niaz Din (PAK)
Bantamweight	Men	Siraj-ud-Din (PAK)
Featherweight	Men	Ala-ud-Din (PAK)
Lightweight	Men	Muhammad Ashraf (PAK)
Welterweight	Men	Muhammad Bashir (PAK)}
Middleweight	Men	Muhammad Faiz (PAK)
Heavyweight	Men	Muhammad Niaz (PAK)

Event		Silver
Light Heavyweight	Men	Muhammad Saeed (PAK)

== Athletics ==
Men
Track & road events

Athlete	Event	Round 1		Round 2		Semifinal		Final	
Athlete	Event	Result	Rank	Result	Rank	Result	Rank	Result	Rank
Anar Khan	1 mile	4:15.9	6	—N/a				Did not advance	
Mubarak Shah	3 miles	—N/a						DNF	
Ghulam Raziq	120 yd hurdles	14.2	1 Q	—N/a				14.3	1st place, gold medalist(s)
Iqbal Sahi	120 yd hurdles	15.3	5	—N/a				Did not advance	
Mubarak Shah	3000 m steeplechase	—N/a						9:41.0	10
Gul Muhammad	Marathon	—N/a						2:38:26	10
Muhammad Yusaf	Marathon	—N/a						DNF	

Field events

Athlete	Event	Final	
Athlete	Event	Distance	Rank
Allah Ditta	Pole vault	13 ft 0 in (3.96 m)	8
Muhammad Ayub	Discus throw	147 ft 8 in (45.01 m)	10
Mohamad Nawaz	Javelin throw	241 ft 8 in (73.66 m)	4

== See also ==
- Pakistan at the 1960 Summer Olympics
- Pakistan at the 1964 Summer Olympics
