= Wrestling at the 2010 Commonwealth Games – Men's freestyle 55 kg =

The men's freestyle 55 kg competition at the 2010 Commonwealth Games in New Delhi, India, was held on 10 October at the Indira Gandhi Arena.

== Medalists ==
Gold	Azhar Hussain; Pakistan
Silver	Ebikewenimo Welson; Nigeria
Bronze	Anil Kumar; India

=== Bracket ===
Preliminary
Anil Kumar (IND)	7	0	0
Carlo van Wyk (RSA)	0	0	0
Promise Mwenga (CAN)	0	0	0
Azhar Hussain (PAK)	6	6	0

Quarterfinals
Craig McKenna (SCO)	2	2	2
Scott Gregory (ENG)	1	2	2
Ebikewenimo Welson (NGR)	1	2	0
Craig Pilling (WAL)	0	0	0
Yaparathna Kumara (SRI)	2	3	0
Justin Holland (AUS)	0	0	0
Anil Kumar (IND)	2	1	0
Azhar Hussain (PAK)	3	2	0

Semifinals
Scott Gregory (ENG)	1	0	0
Ebikewenimo Welson (NGR)	0	2	4
Yaparathna Kumara (SRI)	0	0	0
Azhar Hussain (PAK)	2	0	0

Final
Ebikewenimo Welson (NGR)	3	2	0
Azhar Hussain (PAK)	3	6	0

=== Repechage ===
Repechage round 1
Promise Mwenga (CAN)	0	0
Anil Kumar (IND)	4	0

Repechage round 2
Craig Pilling (WAL)	0	1	1
Scott Gregory (ENG)	1	0	0
Anil Kumar (IND)	4	0
Yaparathna Kumara (SRI)	0	0

Bronze medals
Craig Pilling (WAL)	0	0
Anil Kumar (IND)	3	0
Craig Pilling (WAL)	0	0
Anil Kumar (IND)	3	0
