= Haris Bandey =

Pakistani swimmer (born 1999)

Personal information
- Born: 14 February 1999 (age 27) Islington, England
- Height: 1.83 m (6 ft 0 in)
- Weight: 68 kg (150 lb)

Sport
- Sport: Swimming

Haris Bandey (born 14 February 1999) is a Pakistani swimmer. He competed in the men's 400 metre freestyle event at the 2016 Summer Olympics. He hails from East Finchley in North London and trains at the Barnet Copthall Swimming Club.

Haris started his career competing in the 2013 Barcelona World Championships at the age of 14. Since then he has competed in the 2013 World Junior Swimming Championships, 2014 Youth Olympics, 2014 Commonwealth Games, 2015 Kazan World Championships and 2016 Rio Olympic Games.

He is the brother of fellow Pakistani Olympic swimmer Anum Bandey.
