= Terence Bosson =

English wrestler

Terence Bosson is an English wrestler. Bosson won a silver medal for England at the 2010 Commonwealth Games in the Men's Greco-Roman 60 kg.

== See also ==
- England at the 2010 Commonwealth Games
