= Rajender Kumar =

Indian wrestler (born 1985)

- Born: 25 October 1985 (age 40); Haryana
- Occupations: Wrestling, Greco-Roman

Rajender Kumar
Medal record

Representing India

Men's Greco-Roman

Asian Championships
Bronze medal – third place	2018 Bishkek	55 kg
Silver medal – second place	2010 New Delhi	55 kg

Commonwealth Games
Gold medal – first place	2010 Delhi	55 kg

Commonwealth Championship
Gold medal – first place	2017 Brakpan	55 kg
Gold medal – first place	2011 Melbourne	55 kg
Gold medal – first place	2009 Jalandhar	55 kg
Silver medal – second place	2013 Johannesburg	55 kg

South Asian Games
Gold medal – first place	2004 Islamabad	60 kg

Rajender Kumar (born 1985) is an Indian wrestler. He beat Pakistan's Azhar Hussain in the Commonwealth Games Delhi.

== Career ==
Kumar started playing wrestling at the school level in Gurukul, Kurukshetra from 1995. In the 2010 Commonwealth Games, Kumar won a gold medal by beating Pakistan's Azhar Hussain by 11–0 in the final of the 55 kg Greco-Roman wrestling competition final on 6 October 2010.
