= Abdullah Ghafoor =

Pakistani weightlifter (born 1986)

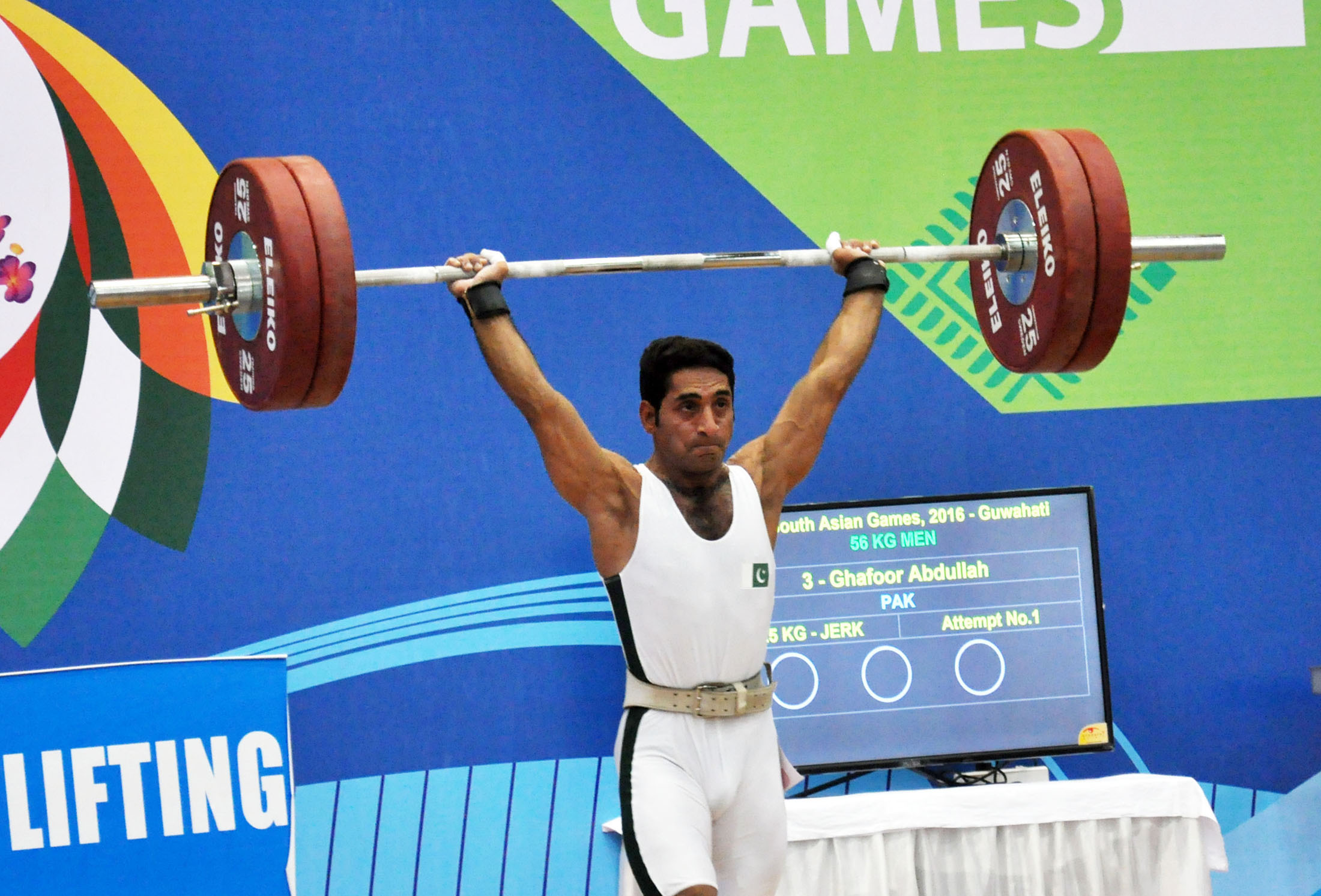
Abdullah Ghafoor

Abdullah Ghafoor (born 2 February 1986) is a Pakistani weightlifter.

== Family ==
Ghafoor is the son of Abdul Gahfoor and the younger brother of Mohammad Istiaq Ghafoor, both of whom have represented Pakistan internationally in weightlifting.

== Career ==
=== 2010 ===
Ghafoor won a bronze medal at the 2010 South Asian Games held in Dhaka, Bangladesh.

Ghafoor participated in the 56 kg category at the 2010 Commonwealth Games in New Delhi, India where he placed fourth with 237 kg total weight lifted. The following month, he represented the country at the Asian Games in China.
