= Azhar Hussain =

Pakistani wrestler (born 1984)

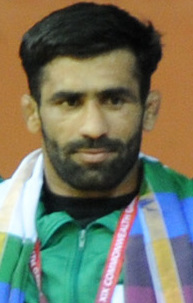
- Azhar Hussain at 2010 Commonwealth Games

Personal information
- Full name: Azhar Hussain
- Nationality: (Pakistan) Pakistani
- Born: 15 March 1984 (age 42)

Sport
- Country: Pakistan
- Sport: Wrestling
- Event: Freestyle wrestling

Azhar Hussain
Medal record

Men's Wrestling

Representing Pakistan

Commonwealth Games
Gold medal – first place	2010 New Delhi	Freestyle (55kg)
Silver medal – second place	2010 New Delhi	Greco-Roman (55kg)
Bronze medal – third place	2014 Glasgow	Freestyle (57kg)

Azhar Hussain (Urdu: اظہر حسین; born 15 March 1984, Muzaffargarh) is a wrestler from Pakistan. At the 2010 Commonwealth Games, he won his country's first and second medals, a silver, and a gold, respectively. His second medal gave Pakistan a Commonwealth wrestling gold medal after 40 years. He is part of 42 Baloch Regiment (MIB), Pakistan Army.

== Background ==
Azhar Hussain belongs to Tehsil and District Muzaffargarh and is a resident of a village near Modka.

== Career ==
=== Pakistan Army ===
He joined Pakistan Army in year 2002 and was recruited in Baloch Regiment. During the initial days of his service, he competed in Unit/ Formation level wrestling competitions and displayed excellent competitive skills of wrestling.

Basing on his talent, he was selected to join Army Camp for further training under qualified Junior Commissioned Officer, Coach Subedar Hashim Ali.

=== Wrestling ===
==== 2010 ====
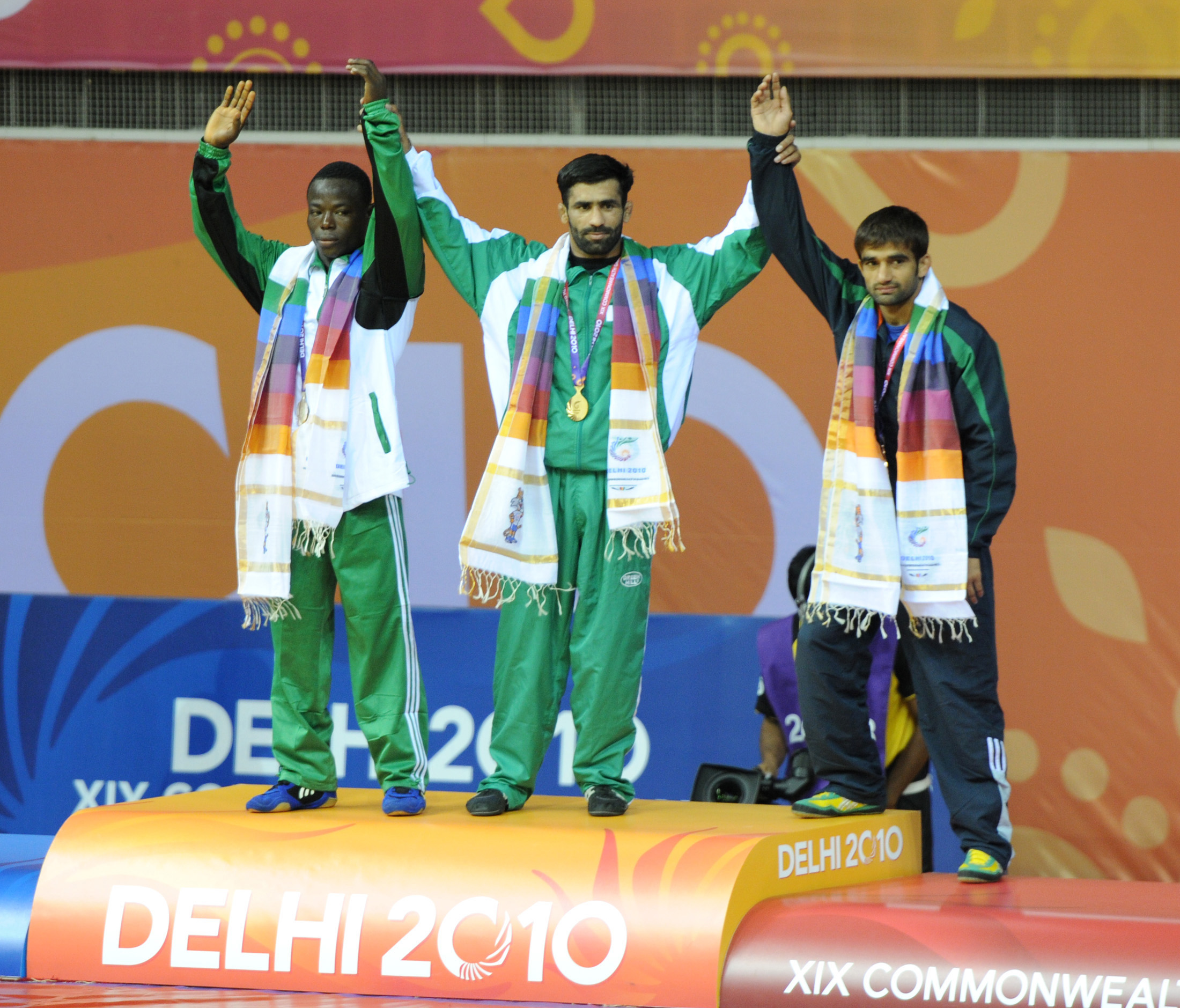
XIX Commonwealth Games-2010 Delhi Wrestling (Men's Freestyle 55 kg) Azhar Hussain of Pakistan (Gold) (centre), Ebikewenimo Welson of Nigeria (Silver) and Anil Kumar of India (Bronze), during the medal presentation ceremony

Hussain participated in the 55 kg class in both freestyle and Greco-Roman at the 2010 Commonwealth Games in New Delhi, India. He won a silver medal in Greco-Roman after he was defeated (11-0) by Rajender Kumar in the final. In the finals of the freestyle event he won the gold, defeating his Nigerian opponent and securing the country's first title since the 1970 Commonwealth Games in Edinburgh, where they won four golds.

==== 2014 ====
Hussain was selected to participate in the 2014 Commonwealth Games in Glasgow, UK In these Games, he won a bronze medal in the 57 kg freestyle wrestling event, beating South Africa's B. Masunyane 4–1.
