= Muhammad Inam =

Pakistani professional wrestler

Inam Butt PP
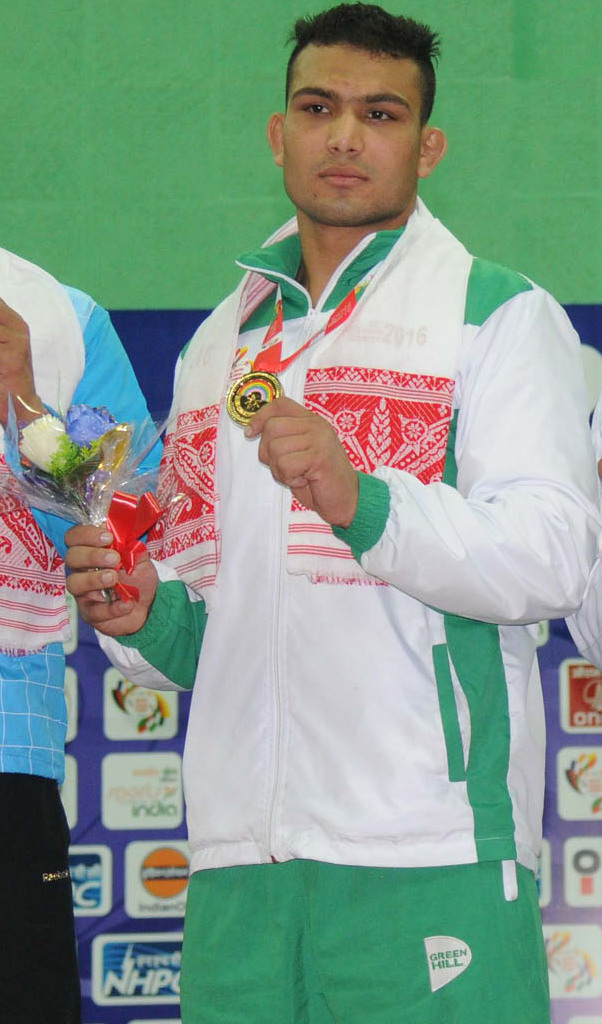
- Butt at the 12th South Asian Games 2016

Personal information
- Native name: محمد انعام بٹ
- Full name: Muhammad Inam Butt
- Nationality: (Pakistan) Pakistani
- Born: 27 February 1989 (age 37) Gujranwala, Punjab, Pakistan

Sport
- Country: Pakistan
- Sport: Wrestling
- Event: Freestyle wrestling
Medal record
Men's Freestyle Wrestling
Representing Pakistan
Event	1st	2nd	3rd
Commonwealth Games	2	1	–
Commonwealth Championships	–	2	–
World Beach Championships	2	–	–
World Beach Games	1	–	–
Asian Beach Games	1	1	1
South Asian Games	2	–	–
Total	8	4	1
Commonwealth Games
Gold medal – first place	2010 New Delhi	84kg
Gold medal – first place	2018 Gold Coast	86kg
Silver medal – second place	2022 Birmingham	86kg
Commonwealth Championships
Silver medal – second place	2016 Suntec	86kg
Silver medal – second place	2017 Johannesburg	86kg
World Beach Championships
Gold medal – first place	2017 Dalyan	86kg
Gold medal – first place	2018 Sarigerme	86kg
World Beach Games
Gold medal – first place	2019 Doha	90kg
Asian Beach Games
Gold medal – first place	2016 Danang	86kg
Silver medal – second place	2026 Sanya	90kg
Bronze medal – third place	2014 Phuket	90kg
South Asian Games
Gold medal – first place	2016 Guwahati and Shillong	86kg
Gold medal – first place	2019 Kathmandu	92kg

Muhammad Inam Butt (born 27 February 1989) is a Pakistani freestyle wrestler. Butt is a two time champion at both the Commonwealth Games and the South Asian Games. He is also the secretary of Pakistan Wrestling Federation.

== Career ==
=== 2010 ===
Inam participated in the 84 kg class freestyle at the 2010 Commonwealth Games in New Delhi, India. He won the gold medal in freestyle wrestling against his Indian opponent, Anuj Kumar on points (3-1).

Inam also competed in men's freestyle 84 kg class in 2010 Asian Games in Guangzhou. He was eliminated in the second round where he lost 3–0 to Yermek Baiduashov of Kazakhstan and didn’t advance to medal contention.

=== 2014 ===
Inam participated in the 2014 Commonwealth Games in Glasgow, but was eliminated in the quarterfinals.

Inam wrestled in the men’s freestyle 86 kg category in the 2014 Asian Games held in Incheon. He won his Round of 16 bout 5–0 but lost in the quarterfinals 1–4 and didn’t advance to medal contention.

Inam was selected to participate in the 2014 Asian beach Games in Phuket, Thailand. Then Inam participated in the 90+ kg class Beach style. He won the bronze medal in Beach wrestling against his Serian opponent, on points (3-0).

=== 2016 ===
Inam participated in the 86 kg class freestyle at the 2016 12th South Asian Games in Guwahati, India. He won the gold medal in freestyle wrestling against his Indian opponent, Gopal Yaduv on points (12-4).

Inam also participated in the -90 kg class Beach wrestling freestyle at the 2016 5th Beach Asian Games in Danang, Vietnam. He won the gold medal in freestyle wrestling against his Iranian opponent, on points (3-0).

Inam also participated in the 86 kg class freestyle at the 2016 Commonwealth Wrestling Championship in Singapore. He won the silver medal in freestyle wrestling there.

=== 2017 ===
Inam competed in the freestyle 86 kg category at the 2017 Islamic Solidarity Games, held in Baku, Azerbaijan. He reached the quarterfinals, where he lost to Azerbaijan's Sharif Sharifov with a score of 10–1 and didn’t advance to medal contention.

Inam also participated in the 86 kg class freestyle at the 2017 Commonwealth Wrestling Championships in Johannesburg. He won the silver medal in freestyle wrestling there.

Inam also participated in the 86 kg class freestyle at the 2017 World Beach Wrestling Championships and won the gold medal.

=== 2018 ===
Inam bagged the gold medal in the 86 kg category at the 2018 Commonwealth Games, Gold Coast, by beating his opponent Nigeria's Melvin Bibo by 3-0.

Inam also participated in the 86 kg class freestyle at the 2018 World Beach Wrestling Championships and won the gold medal.

=== 2019 ===
Inam won the gold medal in the 90 kg category at the 2019 South Asian Games held in Nepal. He also won a gold medal in the same event at the 2019 World Beach Games.

=== 2021 ===
Inam Butt missed out on the 2020 Summer Olympics, he attempted to qualify for Tokyo 2020 but lost in the Asian qualifiers, where he won bronze and never made it to the final Olympic tournament.

Inam won the gold medal in the 90 kg category at the Beach wrestling world series freestyle at 2021 in Rome, Italy. Butt secured victory by beating his Ukrainian opponent by 3–0 in the final.

=== 2022 ===
Inam wrestled in the men’s freestyle 86 kg category in the 2022 Commonwealth Games held in Birmingham. He advanced to the final after decent performances in the early rounds but lost the gold medal bout 0–3 to India’s Deepak Punia, earning a silver medal. He also served as the joint flag-bearer for Pakistan alongside Cricketer Bismah Maroof at the opening ceremony of the Games.

=== 2026 ===
In 2026, veteran wrestler Muhammad Inam Butt won a silver medal in the 90kg category Beach wrestling at the Asian Beach Games in Sanya, China, losing to an Iranian opponent in the final. However, a doping sample collected at the event returned positive for acetazolamide, a prohibited substance he had taken for a legitimate eye condition but failed to declare in time. While the International Testing Agency (ITA) accepted his medical explanation and granted him a one-year therapeutic use permission, the case led to a two-month suspension from July 19 to September 18, 2026, and the revocation of his Asian Beach Games silver medal.

Amid the inquiry, Inam voluntarily stepped down from his roles as Secretary General of the Pakistan Wrestling Federation and Chairman of the POA Athletes Commission, and withdrew from his planned role as coach for the 2026 Asian Games. Following the completion of his suspension, he was cleared by the ITA to resume all wrestling-related activities and was reinstated as the national wrestling team's coach for the Asian Games.

== Awards ==
Ribbon	Decoration	Country	Year
	Pride of Performance	Pakistan	2019

He has received the Pride of Performance award on 23 March 2019.
