= Pakistan at the 1958 British Empire and Commonwealth Games =

Sporting event delegation

Pakistan competed at the 1958 British Empire and Commonwealth Games in Cardiff, in Wales, the United Kingdom. The 1958 Games were Pakistan's second appearance, having participated in 1954. It was Pakistan's third-most successful appearance ever, winning three gold medals. It marked the first of four successive Games at which Pakistan finished in the top ten countries in the medal table (a feat that the country has not accomplished at any other Games outside that sequence). As in the next two Games, the success was primarily based upon wrestling, in which Pakistan won all three of its golds, as well as three silver medals.

== Medals ==
	Gold	Silver	Bronze	Total	Place
Pakistan	3	5	2	10	7th

=== Gold ===
- Wrestling - Bantamweight: Muhammad Akhtar
- Wrestling - Lightweight: Muhammad Ashraf
- Wrestling - Weltwerweight: Muhammad Bashir

=== Silver ===
- Hammer: Muhammad Iqbal
- Javelin: Jalal Khan (athlete)
- Wrestling - Flyweight: Shujah-ud-Din
- Wrestling - Featherweight: Siraj-ud-Din
- Wrestling - Light Heavyweight: Muhammad Ali (wrestler)

=== Bronze ===
- 120 yards hurdles: Ghulam Raziq
- Long jump: Muhammad Ramzan Ali

https://en.m.wikipedia.org/wiki/Muhammad_Ramzan_Ali
