= Malaysia at the 2010 Commonwealth Games =

- CGF code: MAS
- CGA: Olympic Council of Malaysia
- Website: olympic.org.my

in Delhi, India
- Competitors: 201 in 14 sports
- Flag bearer: Siti Zalina Ahmad
- Medals Ranked 7th: Gold 12 Silver 10 Bronze 14 Total 36

Commonwealth Games appearances (overview)
- 1950; 1954; 1958; 1962; 1966; 1970; 1974; 1978; 1982; 1986; 1990; 1994; 1998; 2002; 2006; 2010; 2014; 2018; 2022; 2026; 2030

Other related appearances
- British North Borneo (1958, 1962); Sarawak (1958, 1962)

Malaysia competed in the 2010 Commonwealth Games held in Delhi, India, from 3 to 14 October 2010. Malaysia's team consisted of 203 athletes and 99 officials throughout the Games. Malaysia won 12 gold medals, surpassing the 10-gold medal target set by the National Sports Council, and finished in 7th position in the medal table.

== Medal summary ==
Medals by sport
Sport	gold	silver	bronze	Total	Rank
Badminton	4	1	0	5	1
Shooting	2	3	3	8	6
Weightlifting	2	1	2	5	5
Gymnastics	1	1	3	5	4
Aquatics	1	1	2	4	6
Cycling	1	1	1	3	3
Squash	1	0	1	2	4
Lawn bowls	0	1	1	2	5
Archery	0	1	0	1	5
Table tennis	0	0	1	1	6
Athletics	0	0	0	0	0
Boxing	0	0	0	0	0
Hockey	0	0	0	0	0
Rugby sevens	0	0	0	0	0
Netball	did not participate				
Tennis	did not participate				
Wrestling	did not participate				
Total	12	10	14	36	7

Medals by day
Date	1st place, gold medalist(s)	2nd place, silver medalist(s)	3rd place, bronze medalist(s)	Total
4 October	1	0	0	1
5 October	1	2	1	4
6 October	1	0	3	4
7 October	0	1	0	1
8 October	2	2	2	6
9 October	1	0	0	1
10 October	0	2	1	3
11 October	1	1	1	3
12 October	0	0	1	1
13 October	1	0	3	4
14 October	4	2	2	8
Total	12	10	14	36

Multiple medalists
Name	Sport	1st place, gold medalist(s)	2nd place, silver medalist(s)	3rd place, bronze medalist(s)	Total
Koo Kien Keat	Badminton	3	0	0	3
Chin Eei Hui	Badminton	2	0	0	2
Lee Chong Wei	Badminton	2	0	0	2
Tan Boon Heong	Badminton	2	0	0	2
Elaine Koon	Gymnastics	1	1	3	5
Nur Ayuni Halim	Shooting	1	1	0	2
Pandelela Rinong	Diving	1	1	0	2
Wong Mew Choo	Badminton	1	1	0	2
Bibiana Ng Pei Chin	Shooting	1	0	1	2
Josiah Ng	Cycling	1	0	1	2
Mohd Rizal Tisin	Cycling	1	0	1	2
Nicol David	Squash	1	0	1	2
Nur Suryani Taibi	Shooting	1	0	1	2
Hasli Izwan Amir Hasan	Shooting	0	2	0	2
Bryan Nickson Lomas	Diving	0	1	1	2

=== Medallist ===
The following Malaysian competitors won medals at the games; all dates are for October 2010.

Medal	Name	Sport	Event	Date
Gold	Amirul Hamizan Ibrahim	Weightlifting	Men's 56 kg	4
Gold	Aricco Jumitih	Weightlifting	Men's 62 kg	5
Gold	Josiah Ng	Cycling	Men's keirin	6
Gold	Nicol David	Squash	Women's singles	8
Gold	Chan Peng Soon; Chin Eei Hui; Goh Liu Ying; Koo Kien Keat; Lee Chong Wei; Lydia Cheah Li Ya; Muhammad Hafiz Hashim; Tan Boon Heong; Wong Mew Choo; Woon Khe Wei	Badminton	Mixed team	8
Gold	Nur Suryani Mohamed Taibi; Nur Ayuni Farhana Abdul Halim	Shooting	Women's 10 metre air rifle pairs	9
Gold	Pandelela Rinong	Aquatics	Women's 10 metre platform	11
Gold	Bibiana Ng Pei Chin	Shooting	Women's 10 metre air pistol singles	13
Gold	Koo Kien Keat; Chin Eei Hui	Badminton	Mixed doubles	14
Gold	Elaine Koon	Gymnastics	Women's rhythmic individual hoop	14
Gold	Lee Chong Wei	Badminton	Men's singles	14
Gold	Koo Kien Keat; Tan Boon Heong	Badminton	Men's doubles	14
Silver	Naharudin Mahayudin	Weightlifting	Men's 62 kg	5
Silver	Mohd Rizal Tisin	Cycling	Men's 1 kilometre time trial	5
Silver	Hafiz Adzha; Hasli Izwan Amir Hasan	Shooting	Men's 25 metre rapid fire pistol pairs	7
Silver	Arif Farhan Ibrahim Putra; Cheng Chu Sian; Muhammad Izzudin Abdul Rahim	Archery	Men's recurve team	8
Silver	Hasli Izwan Amir Hasan	Shooting	Men's 25 metre rapid fire pistol singles	8
Silver	Nur Ayuni Farhana Abdul Halim	Shooting	Women's 10 metre air pistol singles	10
Silver	Pandelela Rinong; Leong Mun Yee	Aquatics	Women's synchronized 10 metre platform	10
Silver	Nor Hashimah Ismail; Nor Izyani Azmi	Lawn bowls	Women's pairs	11
Silver	Elaine Koon	Gymnastics	Women's rhythmic individual ball	14
Silver	Wong Mew Choo	Badminton	Women's singles	14
Bronze	Mohd Hafifi Mansor	Weightlifting	Men's 69 kg	6
Bronze	Raihan Yusoff	Weightlifting	Women's 53 kg	5
Bronze	Seng Chye; Benjamin Cheng Jie	Shooting	Men's double trap pairs	6
Bronze	Bibiana Ng Pei Chin	Shooting	Women's 25 metre pistol singles	6
Bronze	Azizulhasni Awang; Josiah Ng; Mohd Rizal Tisin	Cycling	Men's team sprint	8
Bronze	Beh Lee Wei; Chiu Soo Jiin; Fan Xiao Jun; Ng Sock Khim	Table tennis	Women's team	8
Bronze	Nur Suryani Mohamed Taibi	Shooting	Women's 10 metre air pistol singles	10
Bronze	Fairul Izwan Abd Muin; Khairul Anuar Abd Kadir	Lawn bowls	Men's pairs	11
Bronze	Bryan Nickson Lomas; Yeoh Ken Nee	Aquatics	Men's synchronized 3 metre springboard	12
Bronze	Nicol David; Ong Beng Hee	Squash	Mixed doubles	13
Bronze	Bryan Nickson Lomas	Aquatics	Men's 10 metre platform	13
Bronze	Elaine Koon	Gymnastics	Women's rhythmic individual all-around	13
Bronze	Elaine Koon	Gymnastics	Women's rhythmic individual rope	14
Bronze	Elaine Koon	Gymnastics	Women's rhythmic individual ribbon	14

== Archery ==
Recurve

Athlete	Event	Ranking round		Round of 64	Round of 32	Round of 16	Quarterfinals	Semifinals	Final / BM	
Athlete	Event	Score	Seed	Opposition Score	Opposition Score	Opposition Score	Opposition Score	Opposition Score	Opposition Score	Rank
Arif Farhan Ibrahim Putra	Men's recurve individual	637	18	Bye	Constantinos Christodolou (CYP) (15); L 3–4 (55–52, 51–51, 51–55, T9–T9)	did not advance				
Cheng Chu Sian	Men's recurve individual	674	4	Bye	Indranath Perera (SRI) (29); W 4–0 (60–53, 57–49)	Tarundeep Rai (IND) (13); W 4–0 (58–53, 55–52)	Matthew Gray (AUS) (12); L 4–6 (25–24, 27–29, 25–28, 28–25, 22–24)	did not advance		
Muhammad Izzudin Abdul Rahim	Men's recurve individual	660	8	Bye	Simon Needham (SCO) (25); W 4–0 (55–50, 55–52)	Matt Masonwells (AUS) (9); L 2–4 (56–57, 56–52, 54–58)	did not advance			
Arif Farhan Ibrahim Putra; Cheng Chu Sian; Muhammad Izzudin Abdul Rahim	Men's recurve team	1971	3	—N/a		Bye	Bangladesh (6); W 218–201	England (2); W 217–213	Gold medal match Australia (5); L 211–219	2nd place, silver medalist(s)
Anbarasi Subramaniam	Women's recurve individual	637	5	—N/a	Bye	Shahira Abdul Halim (MAS) (21); W 4–2 (53–49, 53–54, 55–54)	Vanessa Loh Tze Rong (SIN) (13); W 7–3 (26–25, 26–26, 21–28, 28–22, 27–24)	Deepika Kumari (IND) (1); L 1–7 (26–28, 21–28, 26–26, 16–26)	Bronze medal match Dola Banerjee (IND) (2); L 2–6 (25–23, 23–27, 22–26, 22–26)	4
Ng Sui Kim	Women's recurve individual	585	15	—N/a	Dawn Nelson (AUS) (18); W 4–0 (51–50, 57–52)	Dola Banerjee (IND) (2); L 2–4 (54–56, 54–53, 47–52)	did not advance			
Shahira Abdul Halim	Women's recurve individual	569	21	—N/a	Veronique Marrier (MRI) (12); W 4–0 (55–47, 49–47)	Anbarasi Subramaniam (MAS) (5); L 2–4 (49–53, 54–53, 54–55)	did not advance			
Anbarasi Subramaniam; Ng Sui Kim; Shahira Abdul Halim	Women's recurve team	1791	5	—N/a		Bye	Singapore (4); W 205–200	India (1); L 185–213	Bronze medal match Canada (6); L 192–202	4

Compound

Athlete	Event	Ranking round		Round of 64	Round of 32	Round of 16	Quarterfinals	Semifinals	Final / BM	
Athlete	Event	Score	Seed	Opposition Score	Opposition Score	Opposition Score	Opposition Score	Opposition Score	Opposition Score	Rank
Lang Hong Keong	Men's compound individual	677	31	Mohd Kaharuddin Ashah (MAS) (34); W 5–1 (59–55, 55–55, 57–53)	Duncan Busby (ENG) (2); L 0–4 (55–58, 57–59)	did not advance				
Mohd Kaharuddin Ashah	Men's compound individual	673	34	Lang Hong Keong (MAS) (31); L 1–5 (55–59, 55–55, 53–57)	did not advance					
Muhammad Zaki Mahazan	Men's compound individual	680	28	Timothy Alexander Keppie (SCO) (37); L 2–4 (59–57, 55–57, 56–59)	did not advance					
Lang Hong Keong; Mohd Kaharuddin Ashah; Muhammad Zaki Mahazan	Men's compound team	2030	12	—N/a		Canada (5); W 230–225	Australia (4); L 220–232	did not advance		
Fatin Nurfatehah Mat Salleh	Women's compound individual	681	10	—N/a	Emma Jane Parker (NIR) (23); W 4–0 (58–52, 54–53)	Ashley Wallace (CAN) (7); W 4–2 (54–57, 59–58, 59–58)	Nicky Hunt (ENG) (2); L 2–6 (28–29, 26–28, 29–28, 27–28)	did not advance		
Nor Rizah Ishak	Women's compound individual	666	22	—N/a	Tracey Anderson (WAL) (11); W 4–0 (56–55, 57–52)	Fiona Hyde (AUS) (2); L 0–4 (52–53, 53–56)	did not advance			
Saritha Cham Nong	Women's compound individual	660	25	—N/a	Lucy O´Sullivan (JER) (8); L 1–5 (58–58, 54–59, 53–57)	did not advance				
Fatin Nurfatehah Mat Salleh; Nor Rizah Ishak; Saritha Cham Nong	Women's compound team	2007	6	—N/a			Scotland (3); W 227–216	England (2); L 221–227	Bronze medal match India (5); L 219–223	4

== Athletics ==
Men
Track and road events

Athlete	Event	Heat		Semifinal		Final	
Athlete	Event	Result	Rank	Result	Rank	Result	Rank
Ahmad Rafee Arifin	100 m T46	12.74	24	did not advance			
Eryanto Bahtiar	100 m T46	11.63 PB	10 Q	11.59 PB	10	did not advance	
Vadivellan Mahendran	800 m	1:54.39	19	did not advance			
Yuvaraaj Panerselvam	800 m	did not start		did not advance			
Lo Choon Sieng	20 km walk	—N/a				1:35:29	14
Teoh Boon Lim	20 km walk	—N/a				1:36:45	15

Field event

Athlete	Event	Qualification		Final	
Athlete	Event	Distance	Position	Distance	Position
Lee Hup Wei	High jump	2.16	8 Q	2.23	5

Women
Field event

Athlete	Event	Qualification		Final	
Athlete	Event	Distance	Position	Distance	Position
Roslinda Samsu	Pole vault	—N/a		3.95	10

Key

- Note–Ranks given for track events are within the athlete's heat only
- Q = Qualified for the next round
- q = Qualified for the next round as a fastest loser or, in field events, by position without achieving the qualifying target
- NR = National record
- N/A = Round not applicable for the event
- Bye = Athlete not required to compete in round

== Badminton ==
Malaysia's Badminton consist of 11 athletes for the 2010 Commonwealth Games . The team won 4 gold medals which were the mixed team and doubles event along with the men's singles and doubles event. They surpassed the 3 gold medal target set by the national sport council.

Individual

Athlete	Event	Round of 32	Round of 16	Quarterfinals	Semifinals	Final	Rank
Athlete	Event	Opposition Score	Opposition Score	Opposition Score	Opposition Score	Opposition Score	Rank
Lee Chong Wei (1)	Men's singles	Alex Pang (CAN); W 21–11, 21–10	Juma Muwowo (ZAM); W 21–9, 21–9	Ashton Chen Yong Zhao (SIN); W 21–13, 21–11	Chetan Anand (IND); W 21–11, 21–12	Gold medal match Rajiv Ouseph (ENG); W 21–10, 21–8	1st place, gold medalist(s)
Muhammad Hafiz Hashim (4)	Men's singles	David Snider (CAN); W 21–12, 21–13	Karunathilaka K. L (SRI); W 21–14, 21–13	Kashyap Parupalli (IND); L 21–19, 19–21, 16–21	did not advance		
Wong Mew Choo (2)	Women's singles	Eileen Karen Foo Kune (MRI); W 21–7, 21–3	Elena Johnson (GUE); W 21–5, 21–10	Aditi Mutatkar (IND); W 21–8, 21–12	Liz Cann (ENG); W 21–12, 18–21, 21–17	Gold medal match Saina Nehwal (IND); L 21–19, 21–23, 13–21	2nd place, silver medalist(s)
Lydia Cheah Li Ya	Women's singles	Susan Egelstaff (SCO); L 14–21, 19–21	did not advance				

Doubles

Athlete	Event	Round of 32	Round of 16	Quarterfinals	Semifinals	Final	Rank
Athlete	Event	Opposition Score	Opposition Score	Opposition Score	Opposition Score	Opposition Score	Rank
Koo Kien Keat; Tan Boon Heong (1)	Men's doubles	Bye	Joe Morgan & James Phillips (WAL); W 21–11, 21–18	Oliver Leydon-Davis & Henry Tam (NZL); W 21–16, 21–13	Hendri Kurniawan Saputra & Hendra Wijaya (SIN); W 21–11, 21–8	Gold medal match Anthony Clark & Nathan Robertson (ENG); W 21–19, 21–14	1st place, gold medalist(s)
Chan Peng Soon; Muhammad Hafiz Hashim	Men's doubles	Shaheed Zaki Hussa & Mohamed Sharim Moh (MDV); W 21–4, 21–8	Ross Smith & Glenn Warfe (AUS); W 21–18, 21–12	Anthony Clark & Nathan Robertson (ENG); L 8-21, 7-21	did not advance		
Chin Eei Hui; Woon Khe Wei	Women's doubles	Gloria Catherine Najjuka & Daisy Nakalyango (UGA); W 21–6, 21–8	Jwala Gutta & Ashwini Ponnappa (IND); L 21–15, 10–21, 16-21	did not advance			
Lydia Cheah Li Ya; Goh Liu Ying	Women's doubles	Juliette Ah-Wan & Allisen Camille (SEY); W 21–16, 21–9	Imogen Bankier & Emma Mason (SCO); W 21–12, 21–16	Jenny Wallwork & Gabrielle White (ENG); L 15–21, 21–16, 13–21	did not advance		
Koo Kien Keat; Chin Eei Hui	Mixed doubles	Kieran Merrilees & Kirsty Gilmour (SCO); W 21–7, 21–14	Toby Ng & Grace Gao (CAN); W 21–7, 21–16	Valiyaveetil Diju & Jwala Gutta (IND); W 21–13, 21–19	Chayut Triyachart & Yao Lei (SIN); W 19–21, 21–16, 21–18	Gold medal match Nathan Robertson & Jenny Wallwork (ENG); W 22–20, 21–10	1st place, gold medalist(s)
Chan Peng Soon; Goh Liu Ying (4)	Mixed doubles	Charles Conra Pyne & Christ Leyow-Mayne (JAM); W 21–12, 21–14	James Phillips & Caroline Harvey (WAL); W 21–11, 21–13	Chris Adcock & Gabrielle White (ENG); W 22–20, 16–21, 21–11	Nathan Robertson & Jenny Wallwork (ENG); L 21–19, 13–21, 21–23	Bronze medal match Chayut Triyachart & Yao Lei (SIN); L 14–21, 21–17, 17–21	4

Team

Athlete	Event	Group stage		Quarterfinals	Semifinals	Final	Rank
Athlete	Event	Opposition Score	Rank	Opposition Score	Opposition Score	Opposition Score	Rank
Chan Peng Soon; Chin Eei Hui; Goh Liu Ying; Koo Kien Keat; Lee Chong Wei; Lydia Cheah Li Ya; Muhammad Hafiz Hashim; Tan Boon Heong; Wong Mew Choo; Woon Khe Wei (1)	Mixed team	Isle of Man; W 5-0; Seychelles; W 5-0; Nigeria; W 5-0; Australia; W 5-0	1 Q	New Zealand; W 3-0	Singapore; W 3-1	Gold medal match India; W 3-1	1st place, gold medalist(s)

== Boxing ==
Men

Athlete	Event	Round of 64	Round of 32	Round of 16	Quarterfinals	Semifinals	Final	
Athlete	Event	Opposition Result	Opposition Result	Opposition Result	Opposition Result	Opposition Result	Opposition Result	Rank
Muhamad Fuad Mohd Ridzuan	Light flyweight	—N/a	Bye	Bathusi Mogajane (BOT); W 4–2	Amandeep Singh (IND); L 1–7	did not advance		
Mohd Subrie Kamis	Flyweight	—N/a	Bye	Brian Mwabu (ZAM); W 6–5	Suranjoy Mayengbam (IND); L 2–9	did not advance		
Ali Muhammad	Bantamweight	—N/a	Bye	Tirafalo Seoko (BOT); L 8–10	did not advance			
Muhammad Hafiz	Lightweight	Bye	Lomalito Moala (TON); L 2–RSCH R3 53	did not advance				
Khir Akyazlan Azmi	Light welterweight	—N/a	Henry Lawrence (DMA); W 4–2	Philip Bowes (JAM); L 2–2	did not advance			
Muhamad Farkhan Mohd Haron	Welterweight	—N/a	Kokole Paneng (LES); W 8–1	Carl Hield (BAH); L 3–7	did not advance			
Mohd Fairus Azwan	Middleweight	—N/a	Jovan Young (JAM); L 3–6	did not advance				

== Cycling ==
=== Road ===
Athlete	Event	Time	Rank
Adiq Husainie Othman	Men's road race	DNF	
Amir Mustafa Rusli	Men's road race	3:57:10	41
Anuar Manan	Men's road race	DNF	
Mohd Harrif Salleh	Men's road race	3:57:10	35
Mohd Shahrul Mat Amin	Men's road race	3:57:10	34
Yusrizal Usoff	Men's road race	DNF	

=== Track ===
Sprint

Athlete	Event	Qualification		Round 1	Repechage 1	Quarterfinals	Semifinals	Final	
Athlete	Event	Time Speed (km/h)	Rank	Opposition Time	Opposition Time	Opposition Time	Opposition Time	Opposition Time	Rank
Azizulhasni Awang	Men's sprint	10.651; 67.599	13 Q	D Daniell (ENG); E Mitchell (NZL); L		did not advance			
Josiah Ng	Men's sprint	did not start		did not advance					
Muhammad Edrus Md Yunos	Men's sprint	10.659; 67.548	14 Q	R Edgar (SCO); D Ellis (AUS); L		did not advance			
Azizulhasni Awang; Josiah Ng; Mohd Rizal Tisin	Men's team sprint	45.378; 59.500	3 Q	—N/a				Bronze medal match Scotland; C Skinner; C Pritchard; J Paul; W 45.040	3rd place, bronze medalist(s)

Pursuit

Athlete	Event	Qualification		Final	
Athlete	Event	Time Speed (km/h)	Rank	Opposition Time	Rank
Mohammad Akmal Amrun	Men's individual pursuit	4:41.754; 51.108	11	did not advance	

Time trial

Athlete	Event	Time Speed (km/h)	Rank
Mohd Rizal Tisin	Men's 1 km time trial	1:02.768; 57.354	2nd place, silver medalist(s)

Points race

Athlete	Event	Qualification		Final	
Athlete	Event	Points	Rank	Points	Rank
Adiq Husainie Othman	Men's points race	—N/a		11	8
Mohd Harrif Salleh	Men's points race	—N/a		3	12

Scratch race

Athlete	Event	Qualification		Final	
Athlete	Event	Time	Rank	Time	Rank
Adiq Husainie Othman	Men's scratch race	—N/a		DNF	
Mohammad Akmal Amrun	Men's scratch race	—N/a		DNF	
Mohd Harrif Salleh	Men's scratch race	—N/a		DNF	

Keirin

Athlete	Event	Round 1		Repechage 1		Semifinals		Final	
Athlete	Event	Opposition Time	Rank	Opposition Time	Rank	Opposition Time	Rank	Opposition Time	Rank
Azizulhasni Awang	Men's keirin	S Perkins (AUS); N Philip (TRI); L Oliva (WAL); R Edgar (SCO); P Mitchell (ENG); A Singh (IND); L	2 Q	Bye		J Ng O L (MAS); P Mitchell (ENG); B Esterhuizen (RSA); R Edgar (SCO); S Perkins (AUS); L	2 Q	1st – 6th classification J Ng O L (MAS); D Daniell (ENG); S van Velthooven (NZL); J Niblett (AUS); P Mitchell (ENG); L REL	6
Josiah Ng	Men's keirin	J Niblett (AUS); B Forde (BAR); B Esterhuizen (RSA); H Mc Lean (TRI); C Pritchard (SCO); P Hylem (IND); W	1 Q	Bye		A Awang (MAS); P Mitchell (ENG); B Esterhuizen (RSA); R Edgar (SCO); S Perkins (AUS); W	1 Q	1st – 6th classification D Daniell (ENG); S van Velthooven (NZL); J Niblett (AUS); P Mitchell (ENG); A Awang (MAS); W	1st place, gold medalist(s)
Mohd Rizal Tisin	Men's keirin	D Daniell (ENG); S van Velthooven (NZL); T Smith (CAN); K Stewart (SCO); T Smart (TRI); R Chandrashekhar (IND); L	4 R	P Mitchell (ENG); H Mc Lean (TRI); B Forde (BAR); R Chandrashekhar (IND); L	2 Q	S van Velthooven (NZL); J Niblett (AUS); D Daniell (ENG); N Philip (TRI); T Smith (CAN); L	6 R	7th – 12th classification S Perkins (AUS); T Smith (CAN); R Edgar (SCO); N Philip (TRI); B Esterhuizen (RSA); L	11

== Diving ==
Men

Events	Diver(s)	Qualification		Final	
Events	Diver(s)	Points	Rank	Points	Rank
1 metre springboard	Yeoh Ken Nee	361.05 pts	7 Q	400.10 pts	4
1 metre springboard	Muhammad Fakhrul	292.10 pts	11 Q	334.20 pts	11
3 metre springboard	Yeoh Ken Nee	399.80 pts	8 Q	422.30 pts	6
3 metre springboard	Bryan Nickson Lomas	325.80 pts	11 Q	419.30 pts	7
3 metre springboard	Muhammad Fakhrul Izzat Md Zain	353.25 pts	10 Q	381.50 pts	10
10 metre platform	Bryan Nickson Lomas	468.00 pts	3 Q	487.15 pts	3rd place, bronze medalist(s)
10 metre platform	Ooi Tze Liang	342.90 pts	9 Q	411.15 pts	7
3 m synchronized springboard	Bryan Nickson Lomas; Yeoh Ken Nee	—N/a		404.64 pts	3rd place, bronze medalist(s)
3 m synchronized springboard	Ahmad Amsyar Azman; Muhammad Fakhrul Izzat Md Zain	—N/a		388.47 pts	6
10 m synchronized platform	Abdul Rashid Muhammad; Ooi Tze Liang	—N/a		372.30 pts	4

Women

Events	Diver(s)	Qualification		Final	
Events	Diver(s)	Points	Rank	Points	Rank
1 metre springboard	Leong Mun Yee	248.70 pts	9 Q	262.10 pts	7
1 metre springboard	Cheong Jun Hoong	227.15 pts	10 Q	235.80 pts	10
3 metre springboard	Ng Yan Yee	231.95 pts	11 Q	290.15 pts	8
3 metre springboard	Pandelela Rinong	255.20 pts	10 Q	did not start	
10 metre platform	Pandelela Rinong	353.10 pts	1 Q	371.05 pts	1st place, gold medalist(s)
10 metre platform	Traisy Vivien Tukiet	268.35 pts	9 Q	310.55 pts	9
3 m synchronized springboard	Leong Mun Yee; Ng Yan Yee	—N/a		260.05 pts	6
10 m synchronized platform	Leong Mun Yee; Pandelela Rinong	—N/a		328.38 pts	2nd place, silver medalist(s)
10 m synchronized platform	Cheong Jun Hoong; Traisy Vivien Tukiet	—N/a		316.38 pts	5

== Gymnastics ==
=== Artistic ===
Men

Athlete	Event								
Athlete	Event	F Rank	PH Rank	R Rank	V Rank	PB Rank	HB Rank	Total	Rank
Lum Wan Foong	Qualification	12.600; 26	11.550; 30	12.700; 30	13.800; 15	13.500; 12 R	13.300; 13 R	77.450	19 Q
Mohd Irwan Miskob	Qualification	11.150; 38	11.700; 27	10.650; 39	14.150; DNF	13.050; 24	12.600; 23	73.300	26 R
Mohd Ismail	Qualification	13.150; 20	13.000; 10 R	12.750; 29	15.200; 10 R	10.550; 42	11.850; 31	76.500	20 Q
Onn Kwang Tung	Qualification	—N/a	11.900; 26	11.800; 35	—N/a	12.200; 31	11.550; 34	47.450	39
Lum Wan Foong; Mohd Irwan Miskob; Mohd Ismail; Onn Kwang Tung	Team all-around	36.900; 8	36.600; 7	37.250; 8	43.150; 7	38.750; 8	37.750; 7	230.400	8
Lum Wan Foong	Individual all-around	12.900; 22	12.300; 12	12.650; 18	13.550; 24	13.150; 15	12.150; 19	76.700	18
Mohd Ismail	Individual all-around	12.500; 23	12.200; 13	11.000; 24	15.050; 10	10.950; 23	10.450; 24	72.150	24

Women

Athlete	Event						
Athlete	Event	F Rank	V Rank	UB Rank	BB Rank	Total	Rank
Chan Sau Wah	Qualification	11.300; 24	12.700; 26	12.100; 14 R	11.350; 18	47.450	17 Q
Farah Ann Abdul Hadi	Qualification	12.050; 17	12.850; 22	10.250; 29	10.500; 24	45.650	23
Noor Hasleen Fatihin Hasnan	Qualification	11.000; 26	13.400; 13	11.900; 16	10.100; 30	46.400	20 Q
Tracie Ang	Qualification	12.950; 8 Q	13.500; 11 Q	12.050; 15	10.000; 32	48.500	12 Q
Chan Sau Wah; Farah Ann Abdul Hadi; Noor Hasleen Fatihin Hasnan; Tracie Ang	Team all-around	36.300; 4	39.750; 4	36.050; 4	31.950; 7	144.050	4
Chan Sau Wah	Individual all-around	10.750; 21	12.500; 21	11.100; 17	13.250; 7	47.600	16
Noor Hasleen Fatihin Hasnan	Individual all-around	10.450; 24	13.500; 9	11.700; 10	11.850; 16	47.500	17
Tracie Ang	Individual all-around	12.050; 13	13.400; 12	12.600; 6	11.250; 22	49.300	9
Tracie Ang	Floor	11.200; 8	—N/a			11.200	8
Tracie Ang	Vault	—N/a	13.137; 6	—N/a		13.137	6

=== Rhythmic ===
Athlete	Event						
Athlete	Event	Rope Rank	Hoop Rank	Ball Rank	Ribbon Rank	Total	Rank
Elaine Koon	Qualification	23.925; 3 Q	24.075; 4 Q	23.900; 3 Q	24.725; 3 Q	96.625	3 Q
Nurul Hidayah Abdul Wahid	Qualification	23.550; 4 Q	23.650; 5 Q	22.900; 8 Q	22.850; 5 Q	92.950	5 Q
Elaine Koon	Individual all-around	24.250; 3	24.900; 3	22.600; 6	24.250; 3	96.000	3rd place, bronze medalist(s)
Nurul Hidayah Abdul Wahid	Individual all-around	23.000; 6	24.050; 4	22.650; 5	22.000; 8	91.700	6
Elaine Koon	Individual rope	24.950; 3	—N/a			24.950	3rd place, bronze medalist(s)
Nurul Hidayah Abdul Wahid	Individual rope	23.600; 6	—N/a			23.600	6
Elaine Koon	Individual hoop	—N/a	25.300; 1	—N/a		25.300	1st place, gold medalist(s)
Nurul Hidayah Abdul Wahid	Individual hoop	—N/a	23.350; 5	—N/a		23.350	5
Elaine Koon	Individual ball	—N/a		24.500; 2	—N/a	24.500	2nd place, silver medalist(s)
Nurul Hidayah Abdul Wahid	Individual ball	—N/a		23.200; 7	—N/a	23.200	7
Elaine Koon	Individual ribbon	—N/a			24.400; 3	24.400	3rd place, bronze medalist(s)
Nurul Hidayah Abdul Wahid	Individual ribbon	—N/a			22.600; 7	22.600	7

== Hockey ==
=== Men's tournament ===
Roster

- Roslan Jamaluddin (GK)
- Baljit Singh Charun Singh
- Hafifihafiz Hanafi
- Izwan Firdaus Ahmad Tajuddin
- Muhamad Amin Rahim
- Muhamad Marhan Mohd Jalil
- Faizal Saari
- Jiwa Mohan
- Mohd Madzli Mohd Nor (C)
- Tengku Ahmad Tajuddin Tengku Abdul Jalil
- Nabil Fiqri Mohd Noor
- Mohamad Sukri Abdul Mutalib
- Muhammad Razie Abd Rahim
- Azlan Misron
- Mohd Shahrun Nabil Abdullah
- Kumar Subramaniam (GK)

Pool A

Team	Pld	W	D	L	GF	GA	GD	Pts
Australia	4	4	0	0	22	2	+20	12
India	4	3	0	1	16	11	+5	9
Pakistan	4	2	0	2	11	9	+2	6
Malaysia	4	1	0	3	5	14	–9	3
Scotland	4	0	0	4	0	18	–18	0

Qualified for the semifinals

5 October 2010
19:00

India	3–2	Malaysia
Mahadik 27'; Sandeep 35+'; Bharat 66'	Report	Hanafi 15'; Misron 34'

Umpires:
Gareth Greenfield (NZL)
Martin Madden (SCO)

6 October 2010
20:30

Pakistan	4–1	Malaysia
Imran 17'; Abbasi 38'; Butt 43'; Waqas 65'	Report	Rahim 32'

Umpires:
Peter Wright (RSA)
Gareth Greenfield (NZL)

8 October 2010
20:30

Malaysia	2–0	Scotland
Misron 34'; Hanafi 52'	Report

Umpires:
Richmond Attipoe (GHA)
Albert Marcano (TRI)

10 October 2010
16:30

Australia	7–0	Malaysia
Doerner 5', 16', 47'; Orchard 11'; Turner 21'; Ciriello 45'; Ockenden 55'	Report

Umpires:
John Hrytsak (CAN)
Peter Wright (RSA)

Seventh and eighth place match

12 October 2010
20:00

Malaysia	2–3 (a.e.t.)	Canada
Rahim 16'; Hanafi 35+'	Report	Pearson 9'; Smythe 23'; Watson 76'

Umpires:
Albert Marcano (TRI)
Haider Rasool (PAK)

Ranked 8th in final standings

=== Women's tournament ===
Roster

- Farah Ayuni Yahya (GK)
- Fazilla Sylvester Silin
- Siti Rahmah Othman
- Sebah Kari
- Noor Hasliza Md Ali
- Rabiatul Adawiyah Mohamed
- Siti Noor Amarina Ruhani
- Juliani Mohamad Din
- Norfaraha Hashim
- Catherine Lambor
- Norhasikin Halim
- Norazlin Sumantri
- Nuraini Abdul Rashid
- Nadia Abdul Rahman (C)
- Norbaini Hashim
- Siti Noor Hafiza Zainordin (GK)

Pool B

Team	Pld	W	D	L	GF	GA	GD	Pts
New Zealand	4	4	0	0	17	3	+14	12
England	4	3	0	1	12	6	+6	9
Canada	4	1	0	3	6	11	–5	3
Wales	4	1	0	3	5	12	–7	3
Malaysia	4	1	0	3	4	12	–8	3

Qualified for the semifinals

4 October 2010
16:00

Canada	2–3	Malaysia
Roemer 56'; Kozniuk 59'	Report	Norbaini 18', 56'; Norfaraha 49'

Umpires:
Kelly Hudson (NZL)
Melissa Trivic (AUS)

5 October 2010
16:00

New Zealand	5–0	Malaysia
Punt 33'; Sharland 35+'; Thorpe 42'; C. Harrison 45'; S. Harrison 60'	Report

Umpires:
Michelle Joubert (RSA)
Dino Willox (WAL)

7 October 2010
13:00

Malaysia	1–2	Wales
Nadia 39'	Report	Wilkinson 24'; Lowry 56'

Umpires:
Gillian Batey (CAN)
Anupama Puchimanda (IND)

9 October 2010
14:00

England	3–0	Malaysia
White 33'; Danson 40'; Twigg 46'	Report

Umpires:
Irene Clelland (SCO)
Michelle Joubert (RSA)

Ninth and tenth place match

11 October 2010
08:30

Trinidad and Tobago	2–1	Malaysia
Wynne 48'; Siu Butt 69'	Report	Sylvester Silin 57'

Umpires:
Anupama Puchimanda (IND)
Dino Willox (WAL)

Ranked 10th in final standings

== Lawn bowls ==
Men

Athlete	Event	Group stage		Quarterfinal	Semifinal	Final	
Athlete	Event	Opposition Score	Rank	Opposition Score	Opposition Score	Opposition Score	Rank
Safuan Said	Singles	Mohammad Raja (IND); L 15–3, 5–7, 0–6; Matt Le Ber (GUE); W 9–5, 6–6; Paul Foster (SCO); L 7–11, 10–9, 1–5; Gary Kelly (NIR); W 7–5, 6–10, 0–3; Robert John Donnelly (RSA); W 12–7, 6–4; Valovale Aukuso Pritchard (SAM); L 6–9, 8–7, 1–3; Ryan Bester (CAN); W 3–14, 10–4, 2–1; Peter Juni (PNG); W 5–9, 15–3, 4–2; Leif Selby (IND); L 5–12, 7–13	7	did not advance			
Fairul Izwan Abd Muin; Khairul Annuar Abdul Kadir	Pairs	Malawi; W 13–6, 11–5; Wales; W 6–5, 8–8; Jersey; W 15–3, 14–1; India; L 2–15, 8–5, 4–6; Malta; W 8–4, 11–4; Falkland Islands; W 24–2, 20–1; Samoa; W 12–3, 14–5; Namibia; W 13–3, 10–3; New Zealand; W 13–3, 8–7; England; L 7–6, 6–10, 1–4; Guernsey; W 17–5, 3–9, 6–0	1 Q	Bye	England; L 8–9, 4–8	Bronze medal match Scotland; W 15–1, 4–14, 5–1	3rd place, bronze medalist(s)
Mohd Amir Mohammed Yusof; Azin Azami Mohd Ariffin; Syed Mohamad Syed Akil	Triples	Kenya; W 17–6, 11–4; Norfolk Island; W 8–6, 10–4; Cook Islands; W 7–8, 12–6, 6–0; England; L 6–9, 11–6, 6–0; Jersey; W 11–1, 8–6; Guernsey; W 7–9, 10–3, 2–1; Papua New Guinea; W 14–3, 19–2; Northern Ireland; W 7–5, 10–9; Botswana; W 4–7, 17–3, 5–3	2 Q	Australia; L 1–14, 8–10	did not advance		

Women

Athlete	Event	Group stage		Quarterfinal	Semifinal	Final	
Athlete	Event	Opposition Score	Rank	Opposition Score	Opposition Score	Opposition Score	Rank
Siti Zalina Ahmad	Singles	—N/a		Bye	N Melmore (ENG); L 6–5, 2–9, 1–2	Bronze medal match K Cottrell (AUS); L 5–12, 10–6, 1–2	4
Nor Hashimah Ismail; Zuraini Khalid	Pairs	Swaziland; W 16–7, 12–3; Samoa; W 17–3, 11–9; Papua New Guinea; W 17–4, 11–5; Niue; W 20–1, 11–3; Scotland; W 12–4, 10–5; England; W 5–12, 10–4, 2–1; Jersey; W 9–5, 12–3; Wales; W 8–4, 12–4; Guernsey; W 16–3, 10–9; Brunei; W 10–3, 12–4	1 Q	Bye	Wales; W 11–4, 4–3	Gold medal match England; L 6–12, 7–5, 2–5	2nd place, silver medalist(s)
Azlina Arshad; Nor Iryani Azmi; Nur Fidrah Noh	Triples	Cook Islands; W 9–8, 16–6; Papua New Guinea; W 13–6, 13–7; South Africa; L 4–10, 8–10; England; W 9–10, 7–3, 7–0; Brunei; W 9–6, 11–5; Norfolk Island; W 16–5, 10–7; Wales; W 11–6, 6–5; Canada; W 9–9, 8–8, 2–1	3 Q	Australia; L 6–7, 6–11	did not advance		

== Rugby sevens ==
=== Men's tournament ===
Malaysia has qualified a rugby sevens team.

Roster

- Dinesvaran Knznnan
- Mohd Hafiizh Zainal
- Mohamad Amin Jamaluddin
- Mohd Khairul Fakri
- Mohd Mohsin Abdullah
- Mohd Saizul Hafis Md Noor
- Mohd Khairol Azhar Md Noor
- Mohd Syahir Asraf Rosli
- Mohamad Nazeer Mohamed Nesharah
- Mohd Faizul Abdul Rahman
- Mohd Saizul Hafifi Md Noor

Pool C

Team	Pld	W	D	L	PF	PA	PD	Pts
Kenya	3	3	0	0	69	22	+47	9
Samoa	3	2	0	1	109	29	+80	7
Papua New Guinea	3	1	0	2	85	65	+20	5
Malaysia	3	0	0	3	10	157	−147	3

Qualified for medal competition
Qualified for bowl competition

11 October 2010
11:44

Kenya	40–0	Malaysia

Delhi University, New Delhi

11 October 2010
14:48

Samoa	61–0	Malaysia

Delhi University, New Delhi

11 October 2010
16:48

Papua New Guinea	56–10	Malaysia

Delhi University, New Delhi

Bowl
Quarterfinal

12 October 2010
09:22

Uganda	26–14	Malaysia

Delhi University, New Delhi

Ranked 12th in final standings

== Shooting ==
Men
Pistol/Small bore

Athlete	Event	Qualification		Final	
Athlete	Event	Points	Rank	Points	Rank
Alais Sulong	10 m air pistol singles	561	16	did not advance	
Hasli Izwan Amir Hasan	10 m air pistol singles	did not start		did not advance	
Alais Sulong; Hasli Izwan Amir Hasan	10 m air pistol pairs	—N/a		1118	7
Hasli Izwan Amir Hasan	25 m centre fire pistol singles	—N/a		562	16
Khalel Abdullah	25 m centre fire pistol singles	—N/a		565	13
Hasli Izwan Amir Hasan; Khalel Abdullah	25 m centre fire pistol pairs	—N/a		1133	5
Hafiz Adzha	25 m rapid fire pistol singles	564	5 Q	758.2	4
Hasli Izwan Amir Hasan	25 m rapid fire pistol singles	576	2 Q	760.3	2nd place, silver medalist(s)
Hafiz Adzha; Hasli Izwan Amir Hasan	25 m rapid fire pistol pairs	—N/a		1144	2nd place, silver medalist(s)
Hasli Izwan Amir Hasan	25 m standard pistol singles	—N/a		554	5
Khalel Abdullah	25 m standard pistol singles	—N/a		540	15
Hasli Izwan Amir Hasan; Khalel Abdullah	25 m standard pistol pairs	—N/a		1089	6
Alais Sulong	50 m pistol singles	—N/a		521	16
Hasli Izwan Amir Hasan	50 m pistol singles	—N/a		524	14
Hasli Izwan Amir Hasan; Khalel Abdullah	50 m pistol pairs	—N/a		1089	6
Mohd Nurrahimin Abdul Halim	10 m air rifle singles	585	10	did not advance	
Zubair Mohammad	10 m air rifle singles	577	14	did not advance	
Mohd Nurrahimin Abdul Halim; Zubair Mohammad	10 m air rifle pairs	—N/a		1162	6
Mohd Hadafi Jaafar	50 m rifle three positions singles	1152	5 Q	1243.9	5
Mohd Nurrahimin Abdul Halim	50 m rifle three positions singles	1134	10	did not advance	
Mohd Hadafi Jaafar; Mohd Nurrahimin Abdul Halim	50 m rifle three positions pairs	—N/a		2289	4
Mohd Hadafi Jaafar	50 m rifle prone singles	587	16	did not advance	
Shahril Sahak	50 m rifle prone singles	589	13	did not advance	
Mohd Hadafi Jaafar; Shahril Sahak	50 m rifle prone pairs	—N/a		1171	6

Shotgun

Athlete	Event	Qualification		Final	
Athlete	Event	Points	Rank	Points	Rank
Bernard Yeoh Cheng Han	Trap singles	109	30	did not advance	
Charles Chen Seong Fook	Trap singles	110	28	did not advance	
Bernard Yeoh Cheng Han; Charles Chen Seong Fook	Trap pairs	—N/a		185	10
Benjamin Khor Cheng Jie	Double trap singles	127	16	did not advance	
Khor Seng Chye	Double trap singles	131	13	did not advance	
Benjamin Khor Cheng Jie; Khor Seng Chye	Double trap pairs	—N/a		185	3rd place, bronze medalist(s)

Full bore

Athlete	Event	Stage 1	Stage 2	Stage 3	Total	
Athlete	Event	Points	Points	Points	Points	Rank
Zainal Abidin Md Zain	Full bore rifle Open singles	103–11v	145–14v	140-9v	388-34v	12
Zulkeflee Hamsan	Full bore rifle Open singles	103–7v	146–13v	136-4v	385-24v	22
Zainal Abidin Md Zain; Zulkeflee Hamsan	Full bore rifle Open pairs	—N/a	296–35v	272–15v	568–50v	10

Women
Pistol/Small bore

Athlete	Event	Qualification		Final	
Athlete	Event	Points	Rank	Points	Rank
Bibiana Ng Pei Chin	10 m air pistol singles	383	2 Q	481.9	1st place, gold medalist(s)
Joseline Cheah Lee Yean	10 m air pistol singles	378	4 Q	475.5	5
Bibiana Ng Pei Chin; Joseline Cheah Lee Yean	10 m air pistol pairs	—N/a		753	4
Bibiana Ng Pei Chin	25 m pistol singles	—N/a		778.2	3rd place, bronze medalist(s)
Siti Nur Masitah Mohd Badrin	25 m pistol singles	—N/a		769.2	6
Bibiana Ng Pei Chin; Siti Nur Masitah Mohd Badrin	25 m pistol pairs	—N/a		1120	4
Nur Ayuni Farhana Abdul Halim	10 m air rifle singles	396	2 Q	497.5	2nd place, silver medalist(s)
Nur Suryani Mohamed Taibi	10 m air rifle singles	395	3 Q	496.9	3rd place, bronze medalist(s)
Nur Ayuni Farhana Abdul Halim; Nur Suryani Mohamed Taibi	10 m air rifle pairs	—N/a		793	1st place, gold medalist(s)
Nur Suryani Mohamed Taibi	50 m rifle three positions singles	569	7 Q	665.4	7
Shahera Rahim Raja	50 m rifle three positions singles	568	10	did not advance	
Nur Suryani Mohamed Taibi; Shahera Rahim Raja	50 m rifle three positions pairs	—N/a		1124	5
Haslisa Hamed	50 m rifle prone singles	—N/a		558	21
Muslifah Zulkifli	50 m rifle prone singles	—N/a		572	17
Haslisa Hamed; Muslifah Zulkifli	50 m rifle prone pairs	—N/a		1165	5

== Squash ==
Individual

Athlete	Event	Round of 64	Round of 32	Round of 16	Quarterfinals	Semifinals	Final	Rank
Athlete	Event	Opposition Score	Opposition Score	Opposition Score	Opposition Score	Opposition Score	Opposition Score	Rank
Ivan Yuen	Men's singles	J Matewere (MAW); W 3–0	J Willstrop (ENG); L 0–3	did not advance				
Ivan Yuen	Men's singles	—N/a			Classic Plate Quarterfinals; D A Khan (PAK); W W/O	Classic Plate Semifinals; H Leitch (SCO); W 3–1	Classic Plate Final; A Clyne (SCO); W 3–2	
Mohd Azlan Iskandar (6)	Men's singles	J Bentick (SVG); W 3–0	R Clarke (CAN); W 3–1	C Grayson (NZL); W 3–0	D Selby (ENG); W 3–1	J Willstrop (ENG); L 0–3	Bronze medal match P Barker (ENG); L 0–3	4
Mohd Nafiizwan Adnan	Men's singles	H Bains (KEN); W 3–0	N Matthew (ENG); L 0–3	did not advance				
Ong Beng Hee (9)	Men's singles	L Chiluyfya (ZAM); W 3–0	L Mosope (BOT); W 3–0	D Palmer (AUS); L 0–3	did not advance			
Delia Arnold (11)	Women's singles	Bye	I Norman-Ross (GUE); W 3–0	K Brown (AUS); L 1–3	did not advance			
Low Wee Wern (9)	Women's singles	Bye	Z Barr (NIR); W 3–0	J Hawkes (NZL); L 1–3	did not advance			
Nicol David (1)	Women's singles	Bye	D Udangawe (SRI); W 3–0	J Chinappa (IND); W 3–0	L Massaro (ENG); W 3–0	K Brown (AUS); W 3–0	Gold medal match J Duncalf (ENG); W 3–0	1st place, gold medalist(s)
Sharon Wee	Women's singles	Bye	J Chinappa (IND); L 1–3	did not advance				
Sharon Wee	Women's singles	—N/a	Bye	Plate Round of 16; D Udangawe (SRI); W 3–0	Plate Quarterfinals; Z Barr (NIR); W 3–0	Plate Semifinals; L Aitken (SCO); W 3–1	Plate Final; A Alankamony (IND); W 3–2	

Doubles

Athletes	Event	Group stage				Round of 16	Quarterfinal	Semifinal	Final	Rank
Athletes	Event	Opposition Score	Opposition Score	Opposition Score	Rank	Opposition Score	Opposition Score	Opposition Score	Opposition Score	Rank
Mohd Nafiizwan Adnan; Mohd Azlan Iskandar	Men's doubles	M Kawooya & I Rukunya (UGA); W 2–0	S Jangra & H P Sandhu (IND); W 2–1	M S Pervez & M M Rana (BAN); W 2–0	1 Q	G Nandrajog & S Suchde (IND); W 2–0	A Grant & N Matthew (ENG); L 0–2	did not advance		
Delia Arnold; Low Wee Wern	Women's doubles	A Alankamony & S Misra (IND); W 2–0	J Duncalf & L Massaro (ENG); L 0–2	S Madhani & K Nimji (KEN); W 2–0	2 Q	—N/a	K Brown & D Urquhart (AUS); L 0–2	did not advance		
Ong Beng Hee; Nicol David	Mixed doubles	H Leitch & L Aitken (SCO); L 0–2	H Reel & K Nimji (KEN); W 2–0	S Edmison & A McDougall (CAN); W 2–0	2 Q	A Grant & S Kippax (ENG); W 2–0	S Ghosal & J Chinappa (IND); W 2–1	M Knight & J King (NZL); L 0–2	Bronze medal match D Palmer & D Urquhart (AUS); W 2–0	3rd place, bronze medalist(s)
Sharon Wee; Ivan Yuen	Mixed doubles	C Pilley & K Brown (AUS); L 0–2	R Clarke & S Cornett (CAN); W 2–1	—N/a	2 Q	C Grayson & J Hawkes (NZL); L 1–2	did not advance			

== Swimming ==
Men

Athlete	Event	Heat		Semifinal		Final	
Athlete	Event	Time	Rank	Time	Rank	Time	Rank
Foo Jian Beng	50 m freestyle	23.73	17 Q	23.72	15	did not advance	
Foo Jian Beng	100 m freestyle	51.95	20	did not advance			
David Wangyu Kulek	100 m freestyle S8	—N/a				1:15.45	6
Fraidden Dawan	100 m freestyle S10	1:04.60	6 Q	—N/a		1:05.17	6
Joshua Lee Leam Yoong	200 m freestyle	1:58.99	27	—N/a		did not advance	
Kevin Yeap Soon Choy	200 m freestyle	did not start		—N/a		did not advance	
Kevin Yeap Soon Choy	400 m freestyle	4:03.25	16	—N/a		did not advance	
Kevin Yeap Soon Choy	1500 m freestyle	16:08.40	9	—N/a		did not advance	
Ian James Barr Kumarakulasinghe	50 m backstroke	27.45	11 Q	27.21	11	did not advance	
Ian James Barr Kumarakulasinghe	100 m backstroke	58.54	13 Q	58.46	13	did not advance	
Ian James Barr Kumarakulasinghe	200 m backstroke	2:08.84	13	—N/a		did not advance	
Yap See Tuan	50 m breaststroke	29.92	12 Q	29.78 NR	11	did not advance	
Yap See Tuan	100 m breaststroke	1:04.87	17	did not advance			
Yap See Tuan	200 m breaststroke	2:22.01	13	—N/a		did not advance	
Daniel Bego	100 m butterfly	55.13	12 Q	54.77	11	did not advance	
Daniel Bego	200 m butterfly	2:01.08	14	—N/a		did not advance	
Ian James Barr Kumarakulasinghe	200 m individual medley	2:07.22 NR	16	—N/a		did not advance	
Daniel Bego; Foo Jian Beng; Joshua Lee Leam Yoong; Kevin Yeap Soon Choy	4 × 100 metre freestyle relay	did not start		—N/a		did not advance	
Daniel Bego; Foo Jian Beng; Joshua Lee Leam Yoong; Kevin Yeap Soon Choy	4 × 200 metre freestyle relay	7:43.92	5 Q	—N/a		7:43.53	6
Daniel Bego; Foo Jian Beng; Ian James Barr Kumarakulasinghe; Yap See Tuan	4 × 100 metre medley relay	3:51.89	6 Q	—N/a		3:48.70	7

Women

Athlete	Event	Heat		Semifinal		Final	
Athlete	Event	Time	Rank	Time	Rank	Time	Rank
Chan Kah Yan	50 m freestyle	27.35	17	did not advance			
Chui Lai Kwan	50 m freestyle	26.38	8 Q	26.03 NR	8 Q	26.05	8
Leung Chii Lin	50 m freestyle	27.15	15 Q	27.13	16	did not advance	
Chan Kah Yan	100 m freestyle	58.36	19	did not advance			
Chui Lai Kwan	100 m freestyle	57.84	18 '	did not advance			
Leung Chii Lin	100 m freestyle	59.01	23	did not advance			
Chan Kah Yan	200 m freestyle	2:05.78	20	—N/a		did not advance	
Khoo Cai Lin	400 m freestyle	4:22.86	14	—N/a		did not advance	
Chan Kah Yan	50 m backstroke	30.41 NR	12 Q	30.19 NR	11	did not advance	
Chan Kah Yan	100 m backstroke	1:05.48	16 Q	1:05.80	16	did not advance	
Christina Loh	50 m breaststroke	33.39 NR	17	did not advance			
Erika Kong Chia Chia	50 m breaststroke	33.56 NR	19	did not advance			
Christina Loh	100 m breaststroke	1:13.14	16 Q	1:13.07	16	did not advance	
Erika Kong Chia Chia	100 m breaststroke	1:13.66	18	did not advance			
Christina Loh	200 m breaststroke	2:41.77	13	—N/a		did not advance	
Erika Kong Chia Chia	200 m breaststroke	2:39.03	12	—N/a		did not advance	
Chan Kah Yan; Chui Lai Kwan; Khoo Cai Lin; Leung Chii Lin	4 × 100 metre freestyle relay	—N/a				3:54.83	6
Chan Kah Yan; Christina Loh; Chui Lai Kwan; Khoo Cai Lin	4 × 100 metre medley relay	—N/a				4:23.40	7

== Synchronized swimming ==
Athlete	Event	Technical routine		Free routine		Total points	Rank
Athlete	Event	Score	Rank	Score	Rank	Total points	Rank
Katrina Ann Abdul Hadi	Women's solo	39.417	4	39.500	5	78.917	5
Shareen Png Hui Chuen; Zyanne Lee Zhien Huey	Women's duet	37.334	4	38.917	4	76.251	4

== Table tennis ==
Singles

Athletes	Event	Preliminary round		Round of 64	Round of 32	Round of 16	Quarterfinal	Semifinal	Final	Rank
Athletes	Event	Opposition Score	Rank	Opposition Score	Opposition Score	Opposition Score	Opposition Score	Opposition Score	Opposition Score	Rank
Chai Kian Beng	Men's singles	J Migade (UGA); W 4–0; J D Pierre (LCA); W 4–1	1 Q	Pang X J (SIN); L 1–4	did not advance					
Kho Mao Sheng	Men's singles	T A Saeed (AUS); W 4–0; M Stubbington (GUE); W 4–0	1 Q	S Jenkins (WAL); W 4–2	Gao N (SIN); L 0–4	did not advance				
Muhd Shakirin Ibrahim	Men's singles	I M McPherson (JAM); W 4–0; E Nasiro (NGR); W 4–0	1 Q	Bye	G Rumgay (SCO); L 1–4	did not advance				
Tan Chin	Men's singles	Oh N H (AUS); L W/O; A Johnny (KIR); L W/O	3	did not advance						
Beh Lee Wei	Women's singles	Bye			A Yang (NZL); W 4–0	Miao M (AUS); W 4–1	Feng TW (SIN); L 0–4	did not advance		
Chiu Soo Jiin	Women's singles	A Phillips (WAL); W 4–2; M A Mohamed (TAN); W 4–0	1 Q	A Mogey (NIR); W 4–0	Yu MY (SIN); L 0–4	did not advance				
Fan Xiao Jun	Women's singles	I Manikku Badu (SRI); W 4–1; H A Hussain (NGR); W 4–1	1 Q	P Campbell-Innes (AUS); W 4–1	Sun BB (SIN); L 0–4	did not advance				
Ng Sock Khim	Women's singles	Bye			Sun Y (NZL); W 4–2	Lay J F (AUS); W 4–2	Wang YG (SIN); L 0–4	did not advance		

Doubles

Athletes	Event	Round of 64	Round of 32	Round of 16	Quarterfinal	Semifinal	Final	Rank
Athletes	Event	Opposition Score	Opposition Score	Opposition Score	Opposition Score	Opposition Score	Opposition Score	Rank
Chai Kian Beng; Muhd Shakirin Ibrahim	Men's doubles	Bye	Ham L & Y Shing (VAN); W 3–1	A Baggaley & L Pitchford (ENG); L 2–3	did not advance			
Kho Mao Sheng; Tan Chin	Men's doubles	O Ferdinand & C M Wells (LCA); W 3–0	S Roy & Amalraj Anthony Arputharaj (IND); L 0–3	did not advance				
Chiu Soo Jiin; Fan Xiao Jun (14)	Women's doubles	—N/a	I Manikku Badu & V Gonapinuwala (SRI); W 3–0	Feng TW & Wang YG (SIN); L 0–3	did not advance			
Beh Lee Wei; Ng Sock Khim (6)	Women's doubles	—N/a	L Dover & G Eloi (DMA); W 3–0	H Hicks & K Lefevre (ENG); W 3–1	Li JW & Sun BB (SIN); L 0–3	did not advance		
Muhd Shakirin Ibrahim; Beh Lee Wei (12)	Mixed doubles	B Chan Y F & J Dewaj (MRI); W 3–0	P-L Hinse & S Yuen (CAN); W 3–2	S K Achanta & S Kumaresan (IND); W 3–1	Gao N & Feng TW (SIN); L 0–3	did not advance		
Tan Chin; Fan Xiao Jun (37)	Mixed doubles	D Reed & K Lefevre (ENG); L 0–3	did not advance					
Kho Mao Sheng; Chiu Soo Jiin (26)	Mixed doubles	R Nyaika & A Kibone (UGA); W W/O	Cai XL & Li JW (SIN); L 0–3	did not advance				
Chai Kian Beng; Ng Sock Khim (20)	Mixed doubles	M A Zahir & F J Nimal (MDV); W 3–0	Prad P-P & Zhang M (CAN); L 0–3	did not advance				

Team

Athletes	Event	Preliminary round		Round of 16	Quarterfinal	Semifinal	Final	Rank
Athletes	Event	Opposition Score	Rank	Opposition Score	Opposition Score	Opposition Score	Opposition Score	Rank
Chai Kian Beng; Kho Mao Sheng; Muhd Shakirin Ibrahim; Tan Chin	Men's team	Canada; W 3–2; Jamaica; W 3–0; Saint Lucia; W 3–0; Saint Vincent and the Grenadines; W 3–0	1 Q	Scotland; W 3–1	England; L 0–3	Did not advance	5th – 8th classification South Africa; L 2–3; 7th – 8th classification Wales; W 3–0	7
Beh Lee Wei; Chiu Soo Jiin; Fan Xiao Jun; Ng Sock Khim	Women's team	Australia; L 1–3; Wales; W 3–0; Vanuatu; W 3–0	2 Q	—N/a	New Zealand; W 3–2	Singapore; L 0–3	Bronze medal match England; W 3–2	3rd place, bronze medalist(s)

== Weightlifting ==
Men

Athlete	Event	Snatch		Clean & Jerk		Total	Rank
Athlete	Event	Result	Rank	Result	Rank	Total	Rank
Amirul Hamizan Ibrahim	56 kg	116	1	141	1	257	1st place, gold medalist(s)
Mohd Ismail	56 kg	109	3	—	—	—	DNF
Aricco Jumitih	62 kg	120	4	156	1	276	1st place, gold medalist(s)
Naharudin Mahayudin	62 kg	125	1	150	3	275	2nd place, silver medalist(s)
Mohd Hafifi Mansor	69 kg	137	2	169	3	306	3rd place, bronze medalist(s)
Mohd Talib	69 kg	131	4	—	—	—	DNF
Zulkifli Che Rose	77 kg	—	—	—	—	—	DNF
Abd Mubin Rahim	85 kg	140	6	173	5	313	6

Women

Athlete	Event	Snatch		Clean & Jerk		Total	Rank
Athlete	Event	Result	Rank	Result	Rank	Total	Rank
Zaira Zakaria	48 kg	75	3	90	5	165	4
Raihan Yusoff	53 kg	80	2	95	3	175	3rd place, bronze medalist(s)
Sharifah Inani Najwa Syed Anuar	53 kg	67	7	83	6	150	7
Nurul Farhanah Johari	63 kg	90	2	105	4	195	4
Nor Khasida Abdul Halim	69 kg	75	9	96	8	171	8
Arisha Farra Erwin	75 kg	—	—	—	—	—	DNF

Powerlifting

Athlete	Event	Result	Rank
Mariappan Perumal	Men's Open bench press	171.4	9
Mohd Shahmil Md Saad	Men's Open bench press	154.1	13
Sharifah Syek	Women's Open bench press	88.1	7
Siow Lee Chan	Women's Open bench press	91.3	6
