= Cycling at the 2010 Commonwealth Games – Men's road race =

Cycling – Men's road race at the 2010 Commonwealth Games
- Venue: Indira Gandhi Arena
- Dates: 10 October 2010
- Competitors: 130

The Men's road race took place at 10 October 2010 at the Indira Gandhi Arena. The race started at 13:00 and covered 168 km.

== Final classification ==
The notation "s.t." indicates that the rider crossed the finish line in the same group as the one receiving the time above him, and was therefore credited with the same finishing time.
130 riders were named but only 51 reached the finish line:

Rank	Rider	Time
Gold medal	Allan Davis (AUS)	3:49:48
Silver medal	Hayden Roulston (NZL)	s.t.
Bronze medal	David Millar (SCO)	s.t.
4	Christopher Sutton (AUS)	3:49:52
5	David McCann (NIR)	3:49:59
6	Dominique Rollin (CAN)	3:50:10
7	Mark Cavendish (IOM)	3:50:47
8	Gordon McCauley (NZL)	3:50:57
9	Luke Rowe (WAL)	3:52:37
10	Jack Bauer (NZL)	s.t.
11	Zach Bell (CAN)	3:52:42
12	Dan Craven (NAM)	3:54:08
13	Andrew Fenn (SCO)	s.t.
14	Alex Dowsett (ENG)	s.t.
15	Adam Petrie-Armstrong (NIR)	s.t.
16	Erik Hoffmann (NAM)	s.t.
17	Johann Rabie (RSA)	s.t.
18	Paul Esposti (WAL)	s.t.
19	William Routley (CAN)	3:54:11
20	James McLaughlin (GUE)	s.t.
21	Evan Oliphant (SCO)	3:54:36
22	Arnaud Papillon (CAN)	s.t.
23	Rhys Lloyd (WAL)	s.t.
24	Phillip Lavery (NIR)	3:54:46
25	Ryan Roth (CAN)	3:55:05
26	Gregory Lovell (BIZ)	3:55:12
27	Tobyn Horton (GUE)	s.t.
28	Yannick Lincoln (MRI)	s.t.
29	Chris Spence (JER)	3:55:15
30	Jay Robert Thomson (RSA)	s.t.
31	Geron Oliver Williams (GUY)	3:57:10
32	Darren Matthews (BAR)	s.t.
33	Nathan Byukusenge (RWA)	s.t.
34	Mohd Shahrul Mat Amin (MAS)	s.t.
35	Mohd Harrif Saleh (MAS)	s.t.
36	Andrew Roche (IOM)	s.t.
37	Erick Rowsell (ENG)	s.t.
38	Sean Downey (NIR)	s.t.
39	Robert Hunter (RSA)	s.t.
40	Daryl Impey (RSA)	s.t.
41	Amir Mustafa Rusli (MAS)	s.t.
42	Dale Appleby (WAL)	s.t.
43	Chris Froome (ENG)	s.t.
44	Simon Yates (ENG)	3:57:14
45	Edgar Nissani Arana (BIZ)	4:06:14
46	Josh Gosselin (GUE)	s.t.
47	Sandeep Kumar (IND)	s.t.
48	Atul Kumar Singh (IND)	s.t.
49	Robin Alfred Ovenden (JER)	s.t.
50	Abraham Ruhumuriza (RWA)	s.t.
51	Lakhshman Wijelath (SRI)	s.t.

=== Did Not Finish ===
Anguilla

- Danny Lloyd Laud
- Kris Pradel
- Ronnie Bryan
- Benjamin Phillip
- Claude Richardson
- Justin Hodge

Australia

- Rohan Dennis
- Travis Meyer
- Luke Durbridge
- Michael Matthews

Antigua and Barbuda

- Ken Manassah Jackson
- Jyme Bridges
- Marvin Spencer
- Omari King

Bahamas

- Rowshan Jones
- Laurence Jupp

Belize

- Jairo Campos
- Byron Pope
- Brandon Cattouse

Gibraltar

- Chris Walker

Guyana

- Marlon Williams
- Alanzo Greaves

India

- Sombir
- Amandeep Singh
- Rajesh Chandrasekar
- Harpreet Singh

Isle of Man

- Graeme Hatcher
- Chris Whorrall
- Mark Christian
- Tom Black

Jamaica

- Marloe Rodman
- Oneil Anthony Samuels

Jersey

- Richard Tanguy

Kenya

- Paul Agorir
- Samwel Ekiru
- John Njenga Kibunja
- Hillary Kiprotich
- Ismael Chelang'A Maiyo
- Zakayo Mwai

Malawi

- Missi Kathumba
- Leonard Tsoyo

Malaysia

- Anuar Manan
- Muhamad Adiq Husainie Othman
- Yusrizal Usoff

Mauritius

- Yolain Calypso
- Jean Charles Pascal Ladaub
- Louis Desire Hugo Caetane

New Zealand

- Marc Ryan
- Clinton Avery
- Sam Bewley

Northern Ireland

- Martyn Irvine

Rwanda

- Adrien Niyonshuti
- Nicodem Habiyambere
- Gasore Hategeka

Scotland

- James Mcallum
- David Lines
- Ross Creber

Seychelles

- Andy Rose
- Francis Louis

Sierra Leone

- Moses Sesay
- Agustine Sesay

South Africa

- Darren Lill
- Christoffer Van Heerden

Sri Lanka

- Dane Nugara
- Lakhshitha Sandakelum Wedikkaralage
- Janaka Hermantha Kumara

Saint Lucia

- Kurt Nahum Maraj

Saint Vincent and the Grenadines

- Hansel Andrews
- Shimano Bailey
- Dominic Ollivierrie

Uganda

- David Kigongo
- David Magezi
- Sebastian Kigongo
- Achilles Katumba
- Leon Matovu
- George Kisenyi

Wales

- Samuel Harrison
- Jon Mould
