= Squash at the 2010 Commonwealth Games =

- Venue: Siri Fort Sports Complex
- Location: Delhi, India
- Dates: 4 to 13 October 2010

Squash at the 2010 Commonwealth Games was the fourth appearance of the Squash at the Commonwealth Games. The Squash tournament at the 2010 Commonwealth Games was held at the Siri Fort Sports Complex in Delhi, India, from 4 to 13 October 2010. The training venue for the participants was Siri Fort Sports Complex – 3. Every CGA has been allowed to send a maximum of 8 players, 4 male and 4 female, for this event.

== Medal table ==
Rank	Nation	Gold	Silver	Bronze	Total
1	England	2	3	1	6
2	Australia	1	1	3	5
3	New Zealand	1	1	0	2
4	Malaysia	1	0	1	2
Totals (4 entries)		5	5	5	15

== Medallists ==
Event	Gold	Silver	Bronze
Men's singles	Nick Matthew; England	James Willstrop; England	Peter Barker; England
Women's singles	Nicol David; Malaysia	Jenny Duncalf; England	Kasey Brown; Australia
Men's doubles	Nick Matthew and Adrian Grant; England	Stewart Boswell and David Palmer; Australia	Ryan Cuskelly and Cameron Pilley; Australia
Women's doubles	Jaclyn Hawkes and Joelle King; New Zealand	Jenny Duncalf and Laura Massaro; England	Kasey Brown and Donna Urquhart; Australia
Mixed doubles	Cameron Pilley and Kasey Brown; Australia	Martin Knight and Joelle King; New Zealand	Nicol David and Ong Beng Hee; Malaysia

== Participating nations ==
- Australia (8)
- Bangladesh (2)
- Barbados (1)
- Bermuda (1)
- Botswana (2)
- British Virgin Islands (1)
- Canada (7)
- England (10)
- Guernsey (5)
- Guyana (2)
- India (11)
- Jamaica (2)
- Jersey (3)
- Kenya (4)
- Malawi (3)
- Malaysia (8)
- Mauritius (5)
- New Zealand (6)
- Norfolk Island (4)
- Northern Ireland (2)
- Pakistan (4)
- Papua New Guinea (2)
- Saint Vincent and the Grenadines (3)
- Scotland (6)
- Sri Lanka (3)
- Trinidad and Tobago (2)
- Uganda (4)
- Zambia (5)
