= Badminton at the 2010 Commonwealth Games =

- Venue: Delhi
- Dates: 3–14 October 2010

Badminton at the 2010 Commonwealth Games was the 12th appearance of Badminton at the Commonwealth Games. The badminton events took place at Siri Fort Sports Complex and Saket Sports Complex in New Delhi from 4–14 October 2010. The games featured six badminton events – singles and doubles for men and women, mixed doubles and mixed teams.

== Badminton medal count ==
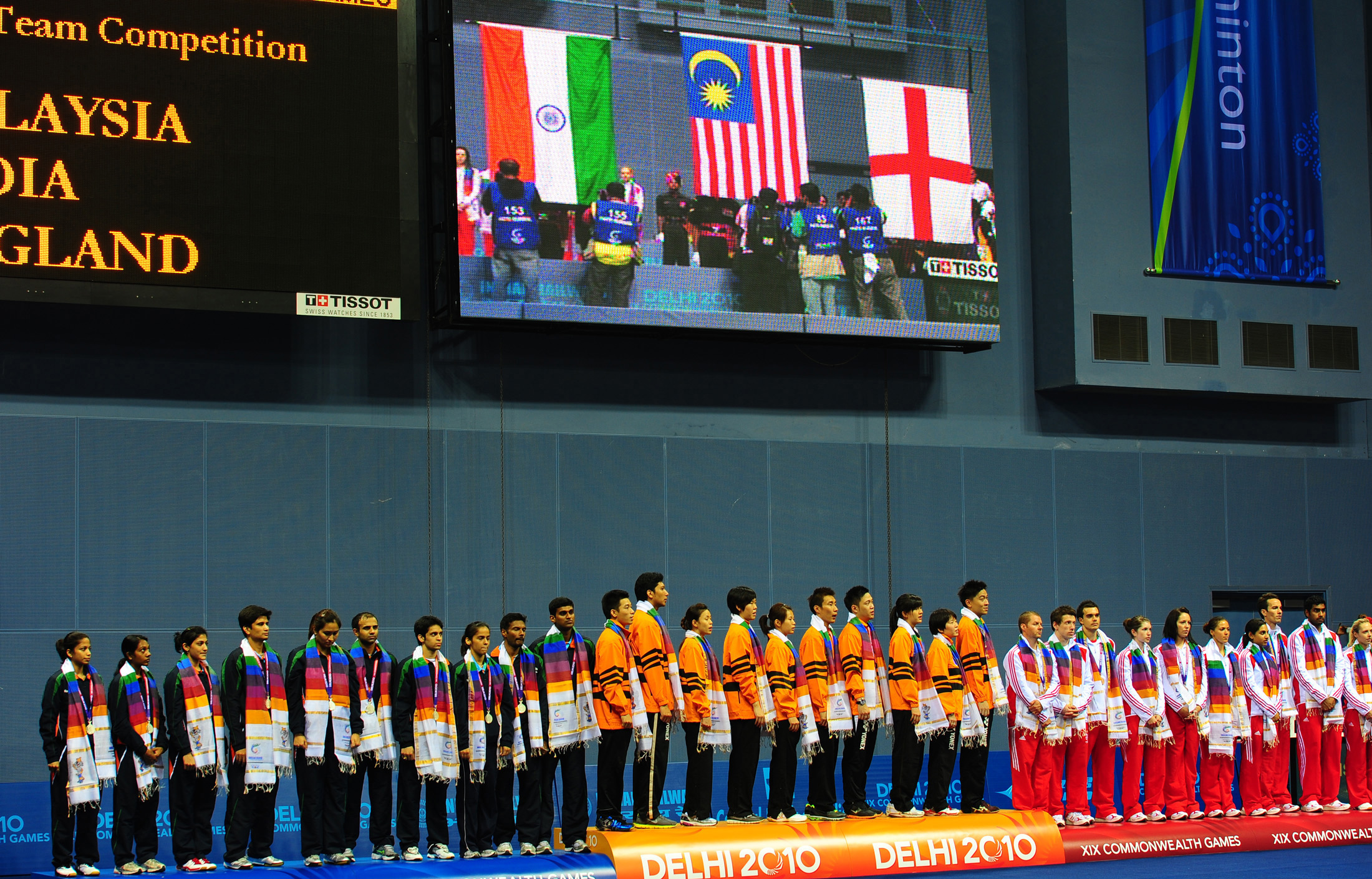
XIX Commonwealth Games-2010 Delhi Winners of (Mixed Team Badminton), Malaysia (Gold), India (Silver) and England (Bronze), during the medal presentation ceremony, at Siri Fort Complex, in New Delhi on October 08, 2010

* Host nation (India)

Rank	Nation	Gold	Silver	Bronze	Total
1	Malaysia	4	1	0	5
2	India*	2	1	1	4
3	England	0	3	2	5
4	Singapore	0	1	2	3
5	Australia	0	0	1	1
Totals (5 entries)		6	6	6	18

== Venues ==
Competition venue

- Siri Fort Sports Complex - 5 match courts and 3 warm-up courts

Training venues

- Siri Fort Sports Complex - 6 courts
- Saket Sports Complex - 3 courts

== Medals by events ==
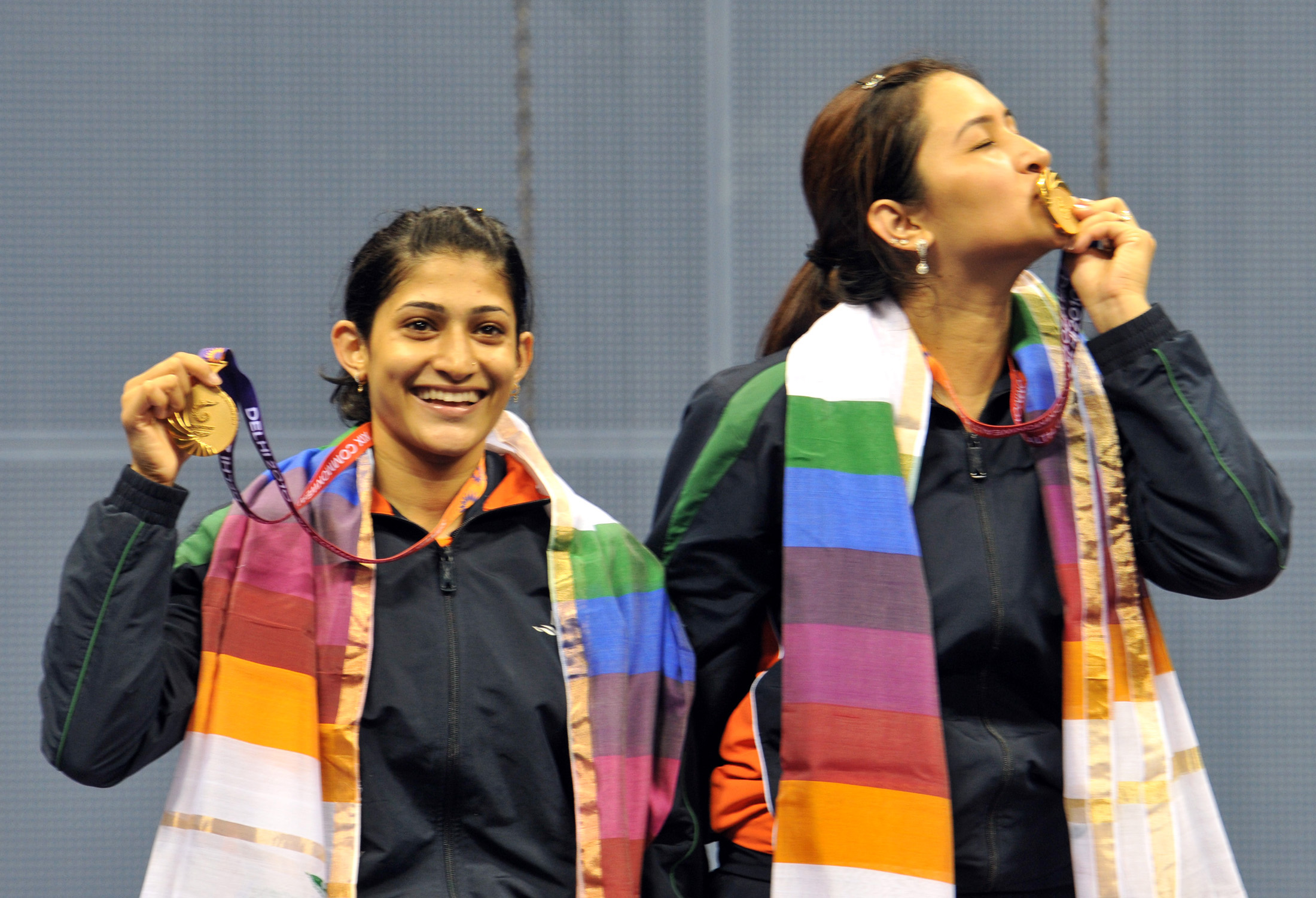
XIX Commonwealth Games-2010 Delhi (Women's Double Badminton) Jwala Gutta and Machimanda Ashwini Ponnappa of India won the gold medal, at Siri fort Sports Complex, in New Delhi on October on October 14, 2010

Event	Gold	Silver	Bronze
Men's singles	(Malaysia) Lee Chong Wei	(England) Rajiv Ouseph	(India) Parupalli Kashyap
Men's doubles	(Malaysia) Koo Kien Keat; Tan Boon Heong	(England) Anthony Clark; Nathan James Robertson	(Singapore) Hendra Wijaya and Hendri Kurniawan Saputra
Women's singles	(India) Saina Nehwal	(Malaysia) Wong Mew Choo	(England) Elizabeth Cann
Women's doubles	(India) Jwala Gutta and Ashwini Ponnappa Machimanda	(Singapore) Shinta Mulia Sari and Yao Lei	(Australia) Tang He Tian and Kate Wilson-Smith
Mixed doubles	(Malaysia) Chin Eei Hui and Koo Kien Keat	(England) Nathan James Robertson and Jenny Wallwork	(Singapore) Yao Lei and Chayut Triyachart
Mixed team	Malaysia Chan Peng Soon; Lydia Cheah Li Ya; Chin Eei Hui; Goh Liu Ying; Muhammad Hafiz Hashim; Koo Kien Keat; Lee Chong Wei; Tan Boon Heong; Wong Mew Choo; Woon Khe Wei	India Sanave Thomas Arattukulam; Aparna Balan; Chetan Anand; Jwala Gutta; Rupesh Kumar; Ashwini Ponnappa Machimanda; Aditi Mutatkar; Saina Nehwal; Kashyap Parupalli; Valiyaveetil Diju	England Chris Adcock; Mariana Agathangelou; Carl Baxter; Elizabeth Cann; Anthony Clark; Heather Olver; Rajiv Ouseph; Nathan Robertson; Jenny Wallwork; Gabrielle White

=== Participating nations ===
- Australia (10)
- Barbados (4)
- Canada (9)
- England (10)
- Falkland Islands (5)
- Guernsey (2)
- Ghana (6)
- India (10)
- Isle of Man (4)
- Jamaica (7)
- Jersey (2)
- Kenya (6)
- Malaysia (10)
- Maldives (5)
- Mozambique (2)
- Mauritius (7)
- Nigeria (6)
- Northern Ireland (4)
- New Zealand (8)
- Scotland (8)
- Seychelles (5)
- Singapore (10)
- Sri Lanka (6)
- Uganda (8)
- Wales (7)
- Zambia (3)
