= Shooting at the 2010 Commonwealth Games – Men's double trap pairs =

The Men's double trap pairs event of the 2010 Commonwealth Games took place on 6 October 2010, at the CRPF Campus.

== Results ==
Rank	Name	Country	Round 1	Round 2	Round total	Total
1st place, gold medalist(s)	Stevan Walton	England	49	47	96	189 (GR)
1st place, gold medalist(s)	Steven Scott	England	46	47	93	189 (GR)
2nd place, silver medalist(s)	Ronjan Sodhi	India	50	45	95	188
2nd place, silver medalist(s)	Asher Noria	India	46	47	93	188
3rd place, bronze medalist(s)	Benjamin Khor	Malaysia	46	47	93	185
3rd place, bronze medalist(s)	Seng Khor	Malaysia	47	45	92	185
4	Russell Mark	Australia	46	47	93	184
4	Nicholas Kirley	Australia	44	47	91	184
5	Jacob Keeling	Isle of Man	45	46	91	182
5	Timothy Kneale	Isle of Man	46	45	91	182
6	William Chetcuti	Malta	49	46	95	171
6	Nathan Yuereb	Malta	35	41	76	171
7	Drew Shaw	Canada	45	43	88	171
7	Paul Shaw	Canada	42	41	83	171
8	Wei Chow	Singapore	37	45	82	160
8	Muhd Ismail	Singapore	38	40	78	160
9	Isatose Talagi	Niue	32	32	64	111
9	Tuaitama Talaititama	Niue	20	27	47	111
–	David Beattie	Northern Ireland			DNS	DNS
–	Mervyn Morrison	Northern Ireland			DNS	DNS
