= Gymnastics at the 2010 Commonwealth Games – Men's artistic qualification =

Qualifications for Men's artistic gymnastics competitions at the 2010 Commonwealth Games will be held at the Indira Gandhi Arena on 4 October.

== Subdivision 1 ==
=== Teams ===
1	England	40.850	41.600	42.850	44.100	43.250	41.900	254.550

2	Canada	38.650	38.600	42.250	42.200	41.450	38.050	241.200

3	Cyprus	36.700	37.900	40.700	41.650	41.400	41.300	239.650

4	Australia	38.350	37.450	36.900	42.400	42.450	41.450	239.000

5	Scotland	36.950	38.500	40.400	41.900	40.750	39.300	237.800

6	Wales	40.250	37.550	39.150	40.900	40.350	38.100	236.300

7	New Zealand	37.650	38.150	39.050	41.600	38.750	36.400	231.600

8	India	19.150	11.200	11.950	26.400	27.500	12.700	108.900

9	Bangladesh	30.950	9.100	7.600	37.600	12.400	2.950	100.600

10	Sri Lanka	11.200	21.050	14.400	23.250	11.250	10.700	91.850

11	Northern Ireland	13.750	14.350	-	14.150	-	-	42.250

=== Individuals ===
Position	Gymnast	Floor	Pommel Horse	Rings	Vault	Parallel Bars	Horizontal Bar	Total
1	Mukunda Measuria (IOM)							
2	Daniel Hedges (IOM)							
3	Alexander Hedges (IOM)							
4	Hunter Robert (WAL)							
5	Matt Hennessey (WAL)							
6	Grant Gardiner (WAL)							
7	Clinton Purnell (WAL)							
8	Dimitris Krasias (CYP)							
9	Michalis Krasias (CYP)							
10	Panagiotis Aristotelous (CYP)							
11	Constantinos Aristotelous (CYP)							
12	Thuang Chan (SIN)							
13	Ryan McKee (SCO)							
14	William Albert (TRI)							
15	Prasad Ekanayake Mudiyanselage (SRI)							
16	Tharindu Paththapperuma (SRI)							
17	John Honiball (NAM)							
18	Lucas Carson (NIR)							

== Subdivision 2 ==
=== Teams ===
Position	Country	Floor	Pommel Horse	Rings	Vault	Parallel Bars	Horizontal Bar	Team Total
1	Australia							
2	Canada							
3	England							
4	India							
5	Malaysia							
6	New Zealand							

=== Individuals ===
Position	Gymnast	Floor	Pommel Horse	Rings	Vault	Parallel Bars	Horizontal Bar	Total
1	Partha Mondal (IND)							
2	Ashish Kumar (IND)							
3	Rohit Jaiswal (IND)							
4	Rakesh Patra (IND)							
5	Matt Palmer (NZL)							
6	Patrick Peng (NZL)							
7	Misha Koudinov (NZL)							
8	Mark Holyoake (NZL)							
9	Max Whitlock (ENG)							
10	Steve Jehu (ENG)							
11	Reiss Beckford (ENG)							
12	Luke Folwell (ENG)							
13	Thomas Pichler (AUS)							
14	Luke Wiwatkowski (AUS)							
15	Joshua Jefferis (AUS)							
16	Samuel Offord (AUS)							
17	Tariq Dowers (CAN)							
18	Jason Scott (CAN)							
19	Robert Watson (CAN)							
20	Anderson Loran (CAN)							
21	Mohd Ismail (MAS)							
22	Mohd Miskob (MAS)							
23	Wan Lum (MAS)							
24	Kwang Onn (MAS)							
