= Shooting at the 2010 Commonwealth Games – Women's 10 metre air rifle singles =

The Women's 10 metre air rifle singles event took place at 10 October 2010 at the CRPF Campus.

== Results ==
Rank	Name	Country	1	2	3	4	Final	Total
1st place, gold medalist(s)	Jasmine Ser	Singapore	99	100	100	99	103.7	501.7 (FGR)
2nd place, silver medalist(s)	Nur Halim	Malaysia	99	98	100	99	101.5	497.5
3rd place, bronze medalist(s)	Nur Taibi	Malaysia	98	98	100	99	101.9	496.9
4	Suma Shirur	India	97	99	99	99	101.4	495.4
5	Kavitha Yadav	India	98	96	98	100	103.1	495.1
6	Sadiya Sultana	Bangladesh	98	96	100	97	104.1	495.1
7	Sharmin Ratna	Bangladesh	98	98	100	98	100.8	494.7
8	Sian Corish	Wales	99	97	96	99	100.9	491.9
