= Cycling at the 2010 Commonwealth Games – Men's scratch race =

The Men's Scratch took place at 8 October 2010 at the Indira Gandhi Arena.

== Results ==
Rank	Name	Nation	Laps Down
1st place, gold medalist(s)	Cameron Meyer	Australia	
2nd place, silver medalist(s)	Michael Freiberg	Australia	
3rd place, bronze medalist(s)	Zach Bell	Canada	
4	Marc Ryan	New Zealand	
5	Evan Oliphant	Scotland	
DNF	Jack Bobridge	Australia	
DNF	Darren Matthews	Barbados	
DNF	George Atkins	England	
DNF	Simon Yates	England	
DNF	Rajender Bishnoi	India	
DNF	Mark Christian	Isle of Man	
DNF	Christopher Whorrall	Isle of Man	
DNF	Marloe Rodman	Jamaica	
DNF	Mohammad Amrun	Malaysia	
DNF	Muhamad Othman	Malaysia	
DNF	Mohd Salleh	Malaysia	
DNF	Martyn Irvine	Northern Ireland	
DNF	Shane Archbold	New Zealand	
DNF	Dean Edwards	South Africa	
DNF	Jay Thomson	South Africa	
DNF	Christoffel van Heerden	South Africa	
DNF	Emile Abraham	Trinidad and Tobago	
DNF	Jon Mould	Wales	
