= Archery at the 2010 Commonwealth Games – Men's recurve team =

Men's Recurve Team (Archery) at 2010 Commonwealth Games

The Men's recurve team at the 2010 Commonwealth Games took place on 8 October 2010.

== Teams ==
Eleven teams participated in the competition:

Seed	Country	Athletes
1	India	Rahul Banerjee; Tarundeep Rai; Jayanta Talukdar
2	England	Larry Godfrey; Simon Terry; Alan Wills
3	Malaysia	Muhammad Abdul Rahim; Chu Cheng; Arif Ibrahim Putra
4	Canada	Crispin Duenas; Jason Lyon; Hugh Macdonald
5	Australia	Matthew Gray; Mat Masonwells; Taylor Worth
6	Bangladesh	Emdadul Milon; Shiek Sojeb; Ziaul Zia

Seed	Country	Athletes
7	Northern Ireland	Ian McGibbon; Mark Nesbitt; Karl Watson
8	Scotland	Mark Forrester; James Laing; Simon Needham
9	Sri Lanka	Indranath Perera; Lakmal Rajasinghe; Nipun Mudiyanselage
10	Cyprus	Constantin Christodoulou; Mimis El Helali; Konstantinos Loizou
11	Mauritius	Jean Babet; Pascal Olivier; Wasim Yacoob

== Elimination round ==
First Round
8	Scotland	197
9	Sri Lanka	199
11	Mauritius	176
6	Bangladesh	218
7	Northern Ireland	213
10	Cyprus	216

Quarterfinals
1	India	213
9	Sri Lanka	205
5	Australia	218
4	Canada	216
3	Malaysia	218
6	Bangladesh	201
10	Cyprus	209
2	England	218

Semifinals
1	India	211
5	Australia	217
3	Malaysia	217
2	England	213

Finals
5	Australia	219
3	Malaysia	211
Third place
5	India	221
3	England	218
