= Squash at the 2010 Commonwealth Games – Mixed doubles =

The Mixed doubles event at the 2010 Commonwealth Games was held at the Siri Fort Sports Complex, New Delhi from 9 October to 13 October.

Cameron Pilley and Kasey Brown of Australia won the gold medal.

== Seeds ==
1. (Australia) Cameron Pilley & Kasey Brown
2. (England) James Willstrop & Jenny Duncalf
3. (Malaysia) Ong Beng Hee & Nicol David
4. (India) Saurav Ghosal & Joshna Chinappa
5. (New Zealand) Campbell Grayson & Jaclyn Hawkes
6. (England) Adrian Grant & Sarah Kippax
7. no seed, India withdrew
8. (Australia) David Palmer & Donna Urquhart
9. (Scotland) Alan Clyne & Frania Gillen-Buchert
10. (Scotland) Harry Leitch & Lisa Aitken
11. (New Zealand) Martin Knight & Joelle King
12. (Malaysia) Ivan Yuen & Sharon Wee

== Finals ==
Quarterfinals
Kasey Brown (AUS); Cameron Pilley (AUS)	11	7	11
Jenny Duncalf (ENG); James Willstrop (ENG)	7	11	8
Lisa Aitken (SCO); Harry Leitch (SCO)	3	3
Donna Urquhart (AUS); David Palmer (AUS)	11	11
Nicol David (MAS); Ong Beng Hee (MAS)	11	7	11
Joshna Chinappa (IND); Saurav Ghosal (IND)	5	11	7
Jaclyn Hawkes (NZL); Campbell Grayson (NZL)	6	9
Joelle King (NZL); Martin Knight (NZL)	11	11

Semifinals
Kasey Brown (AUS); Cameron Pilley (AUS)	11	11
Donna Urquhart (AUS); David Palmer (AUS)	10	10
Nicol David (MAS); Ong Beng Hee (MAS)	7	10
Joelle King (NZL); Martin Knight (NZL)	11	11

Gold Medal Match
Kasey Brown (AUS); Cameron Pilley (AUS)	8	11	11
Joelle King (NZL); Martin Knight (NZL)	11	7	5
Bronze Medal Match
Donna Urquhart (AUS); David Palmer (AUS)	9	6
Nicol David (MAS); Ong Beng Hee (MAS)	11	11
