= Badminton at the 2010 Commonwealth Games – Mixed doubles =

The Mixed doubles event of badminton at the 2010 Commonwealth Games was held from 10 October – 14 October 2010 in Siri Fort Sports Complex, New Delhi, India.

== Finals ==
Quarterfinals
1	Nathan Robertson (ENG); Jenny Wallwork (ENG)	22	23
Watson Briggs (SCO); Imogen Bankier (SCO)	20	21
4	Chan Peng Soon (MAS); Goh Liu Ying (MAS)	22	16	21
7	Chris Adcock (ENG); Gabrielle White (ENG)	20	21	11
5	Anthony Clark (ENG); Heather Olver (ENG)	21	8	12
3	Chayut Triyachart (SIN); Yao Lei (SIN)	19	21	21
Koo Kien Keat (MAS); Chin Eei Hui (MAS)	21	21
2	Valiyaveetil Diju (IND); Jwala Gutta (IND)	13	19

Semifinals
1	Nathan Robertson (ENG); Jenny Wallwork (ENG)	19	21	23
4	Chan Peng Soon (MAS); Goh Liu Ying (MAS)	21	13	21
3	Chayut Triyachart (SIN); Yao Lei (SIN)	21	16	18
Koo Kien Keat (MAS); Chin Eei Hui (MAS)	19	21	21

Gold Medal Match
1	Nathan Robertson (ENG); Jenny Wallwork (ENG)	20	12
Koo Kien Keat (MAS); Chin Eei Hui (MAS)	22	21
Bronze Medal Match
4	Chan Peng Soon (MAS); Goh Liu Ying (MAS)	14	21	17
3	Chayut Triyachart (SIN); Yao Lei (SIN)	21	17	21
