= Weightlifting at the 2010 Commonwealth Games – Women's 53 kg =

Weightlifting event

Weightlifting – Women's 53 kg at the 2010 Commonwealth Games
- Venue: Jawaharlal Nehru Stadium
- Dates: 5 October 2010
- Competitors: 11 from 11 nations
- Winning total weight: 182 kg

Medalists
gold medal	Marilou Dozois-Prévost	Canada
silver medal	Onyeka Azike	Nigeria
bronze medal	Raihan Yusoff	Malaysia

The women's 53 kg weightlifting event was the second lightest women's event at the weightlifting competition, limiting competitors to a maximum of 53 kilograms of body mass. The competition was held on 5 October . The weightlifter from Canada won the gold, with a combined lift of 182 kg.

== Athletes ==
11 lifters were selected for the games.

	Athlete	Year of birth
1	Helena Wong Kar Mun (SIN)	1988
2	Figroga Parvin (BAN)	1986
3	Raihan Yusoff (MAS)	1988
4	Onyeka Azike (NGR)	1990
5	Hitolo Dogogo (PNG)	1992
6	Jo Calvino (ENG)	1980
7	Marilou Dozois-Prévost (CAN)	1986
8	Swati Singh (IND)	1987
9	Sharifah Inani Syd Anuar (MAS)	1990
10	Kate Howard (NZL)	1979
11	Alina McHochoma (MAW)	1993

== Results ==
Rank	Name	Country	B.weight (kg)	Snatch (kg)	Clean & Jerk (kg)	Total (kg)
1st place, gold medalist(s)	Marilou Dozois-Prévost	Canada	52.80	82	100	182
2nd place, silver medalist(s)	Onyeka Azike	Nigeria	51.95	80	100	180
3rd place, bronze medalist(s)	Raihan Yusoff	Malaysia	52.84	80	95	175
4	Swati Singh	India	52.90	74	92	166
5	Jo Calvino	England	52.45	66	93	159
6	Kate Howard	New Zealand	52.65	70	83	153
7	Sharifah Inani Syd Anuar	Malaysia	52.00	67	83	150
8	Helena Wong	Singapore	51.93	66	80	146
9	Hitolo Dogogo	Papua New Guinea	52.44	63	75	138
10	Figroga Parvin	Bangladesh	52.56	63	73	136
11	Alina McHochoma	Malawi	52.21	47	65	112

== See also ==
- 2010 Commonwealth Games
- Weightlifting at the 2010 Commonwealth Games
