= Diving at the 2010 Commonwealth Games – Men's 10 metre platform =

The Men's 10 metre platform diving event is one of 260 events in 17 disciplines at the 2010 Commonwealth Games. It was held on 13 October 2010.

== Results ==
Green denotes finalists

Rank	Diver	Preliminary		Final	
Rank	Diver	Points	Rank	Points	Rank
Gold medal	Tom Daley (ENG)	502.55	2	538.35	1
Silver medal	Matthew Mitcham (AUS)	511.70	1	509.15	2
Bronze medal	Bryan Lomas (MAS)	468.00	3	487.15	3
4	Kevin Geyson (CAN)	390.75	7	447.70	4
5	Ethan Warren (AUS)	458.00	4	445.25	5
6	Eric Sehn (CAN)	395.25	6	419.90	6
7	Ooi Tze Liang (MAS)	342.90	9	411.15	7
8	Max Brick (ENG)	443.25	5	409.35	8
9	James Connor (AUS)	348.30	8	408.50	9
10	Puskar Chingshubam (IND)	307.30	10	292.00	10
11	Himanshu Tiwari (IND)	227.40	11	248.60	11
