= Cycling at the 2010 Commonwealth Games =

Cycling at the 2010 Commonwealth Games was the 18th appearance of Cycling at the Commonwealth Games. The cycling competition comprised two disciplines: road cycling and track cycling. The track events were held at the Indira Gandhi Arena, while the road events were held at Noida–Greater Noida Expressway. Track events were held from 5–9 October 2010.

== Medal table ==
Rank	Nation	Gold	Silver	Bronze	Total
1	Australia	14	3	4	21
2	New Zealand	1	7	3	11
3	Malaysia	1	1	1	3
3	Scotland	1	1	1	3
5	Canada	1	0	4	5
6	England	0	4	2	6
7	Northern Ireland	0	1	1	2
7	Wales	0	1	1	2
9	Isle of Man	0	0	1	1
Totals (9 entries)		18	18	18	54

== Medal summary ==
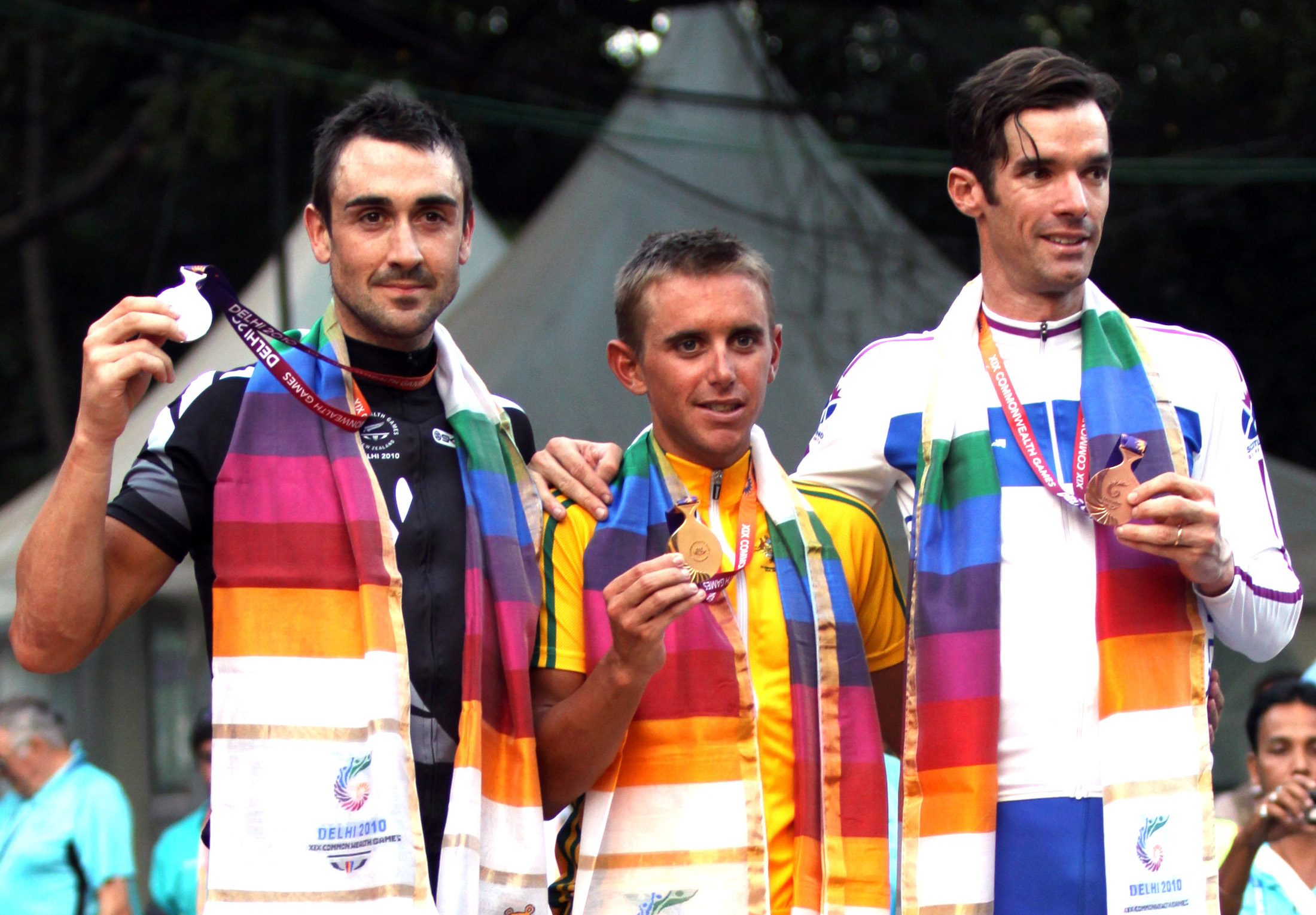
XIX Commonwealth Games-2010 Delhi Winners of (Men's Road Race) Allan Davis of Australia (Gold), Hayden Roulston of New Zealand (Silver) and David Millar of Scotland (Bronze)

=== Road ===
Event	Gold	Silver	Bronze
Men's road race	Allan Davis; Australia	Hayden Roulston; New Zealand	David Millar; Scotland
Women's road race	Rochelle Gilmore; Australia	Lizzie Armitstead; England	Chloe Hosking; Australia
Men's time trial	David Millar; Scotland	Alex Dowsett; England	Luke Durbridge; Australia
Women's time trial	Tara Whitten; Canada	Linda Villumsen; New Zealand	Julia Shaw; England

=== Track ===
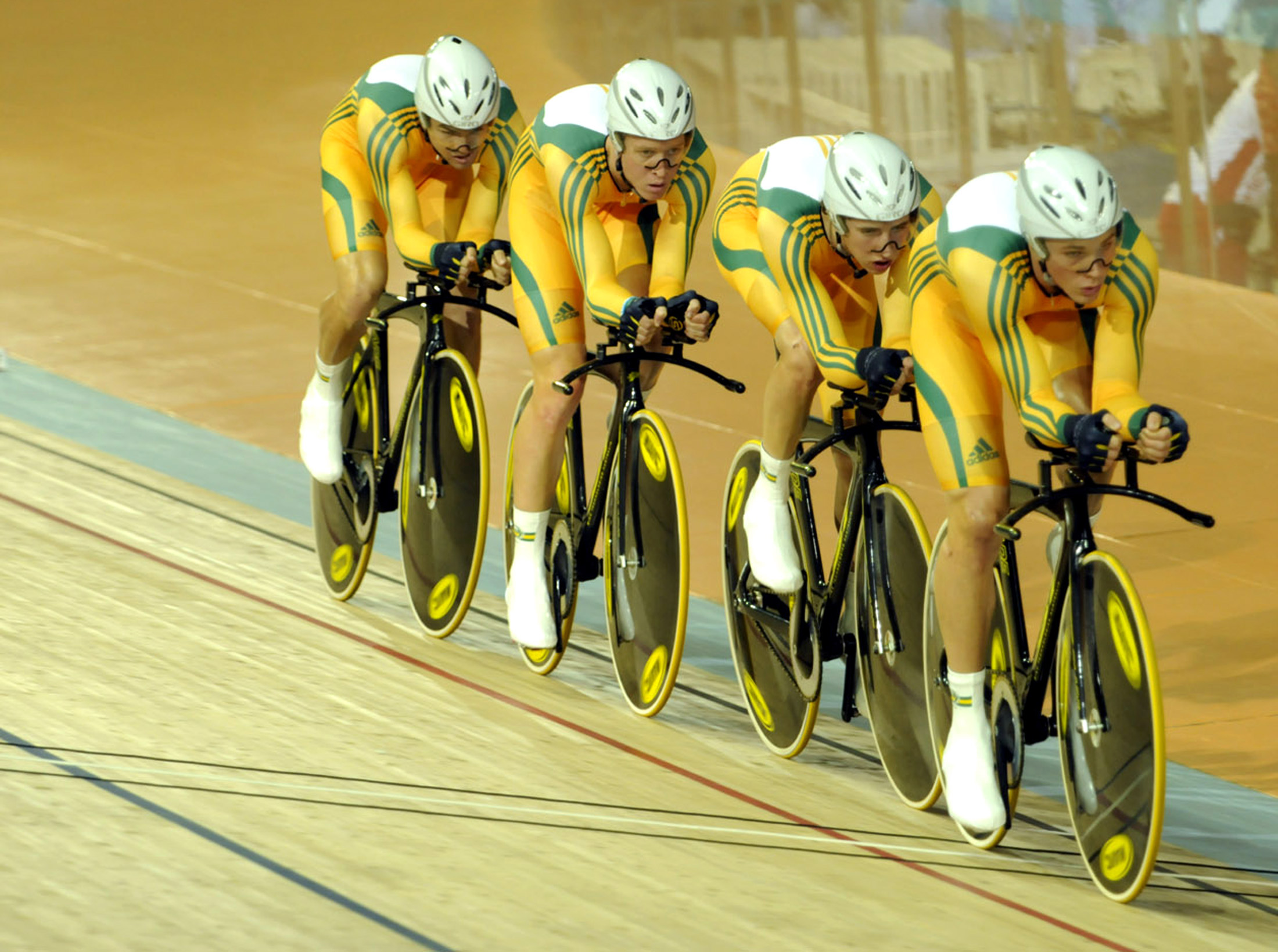
XIX Commonwealth Games-2010 Delhi (Men's) Gold Medal Winners in Cycling Bobridge Jack, Hepburn Michael, Meyer Cameron and Parker Dale, at Indira Gandhi Sports Complex, in New Delhi on October 07, 2010

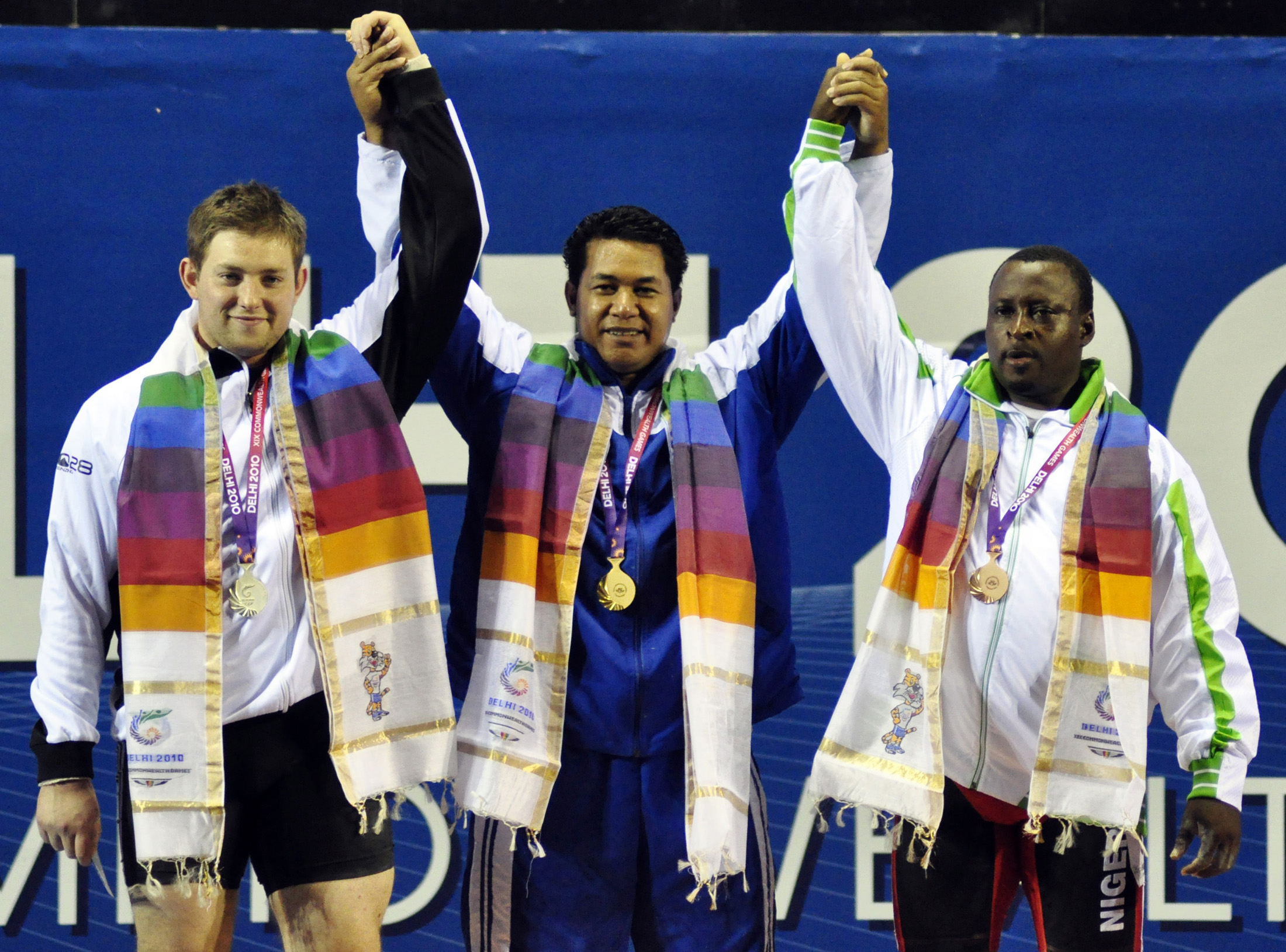
XIX Commonwealth Games-2010 Delhi Winners of Weightlifting (Men's 105 kg), Niusila Opeloge of Samoa (Gold), Stanislav Chalaev of New Zealand (Silver) and Curtis Onaghinor of Nigeria (Bronze)

XIX Commonwealth Games-2010 Delhi (Women's Individual Sprint) Gold Medal winner Meares Anna of Australia, Silver Medal winner Becky James of Wales, Bronze Medal winner Rosemond Emily of Australia

Event	Gold	Silver	Bronze
Men's individual pursuit	Jack Bobridge; Australia	Jesse Sergent; New Zealand	Michael Hepburn; Australia
Women's individual pursuit	Alison Shanks; New Zealand	Wendy Houvenaghel; Northern Ireland	Tara Whitten; Canada
Men's team pursuit	Australia; Jack Bobridge; Michael Hepburn; Cameron Meyer; Dale Parker; Michael Freiberg	New Zealand; Sam Bewley; Westley Gough; Marc Ryan; Jesse Sergent	Northern Ireland; Sean Downey; Martyn Irvine; Philip Lavery; David McCann
Men's individual sprint	Shane Perkins; Australia	Scott Sunderland; Australia	Sam Webster; New Zealand
Women's individual sprint	Anna Meares; Australia	Becky James; Wales	Emily Rosemond; Australia
Men's team sprint	Australia; Daniel Ellis; Jason Niblett; Scott Sunderland	New Zealand; Edward Dawkins; Ethan Mitchell; Sam Webster	Malaysia; Azizulhasni Awang; Josiah Ng; Mohd Rizal Tisin
Women's team sprint	Australia; Anna Meares; Kaarle McCulloch	Scotland; Jenny Davis; Charline Joiner	Canada; Monique Sullivan; Tara Whitten
Men's points race	Cameron Meyer; Australia	George Atkins; England	Mark Christian; Isle of Man
Women's points race	Megan Dunn; Australia	Lauren Ellis; New Zealand	Tara Whitten; Canada
Men's scratch	Cameron Meyer; Australia	Michael Freiberg; Australia	Zachary Bell; Canada
Women's scratch	Megan Dunn; Australia	Joanne Kiesanowski; New Zealand	Anna Blyth; England
Men's keirin	Josiah Ng; Malaysia	David Daniell; England	Simon van Velthooven; New Zealand
Men's 1 km time trial	Scott Sunderland; Australia	Mohd Rizal Tisin; Malaysia	Edward Dawkins; New Zealand
Women's 500 m time trial	Anna Meares; Australia	Kaarle McCulloch; Australia	Becky James; Wales
