= Shooting at the 2010 Commonwealth Games – Women's 10 metre air pistol singles =

The Women's 10 metre air pistol singles event took place at 13 October 2010 at the CRPF Campus. There was a qualification round held to determine the final participants.

== Results ==
Rank	Name	1	2	3	4	Final	Total
1st place, gold medalist(s)	Pei Ng (MAS)	93	98	96	96	98.9	481.9
2nd place, silver medalist(s)	Heena Sidhu (IND)	96	95	97	95	98.6	481.6
3rd place, bronze medalist(s)	Dina Aspandiyarova (AUS)	96	92	97	95	98.8	478.8
4	Annu Singh (IND)	96	93	94	94	98.7	475.7
5	Lee Cheah (MAS)	94	95	95	94	97.5	475.5
6	Lynda Hare (CAN)	94	91	95	95	96.9	471.9
7	Julia Lydall (ENG)	93	92	92	97	97.6	471.6
8	Dorothy Ludwig (CAN)	90	94	95	97	94.8	470.8
