= Chayut Triyachart =

Thai-born Singaporean former badminton player

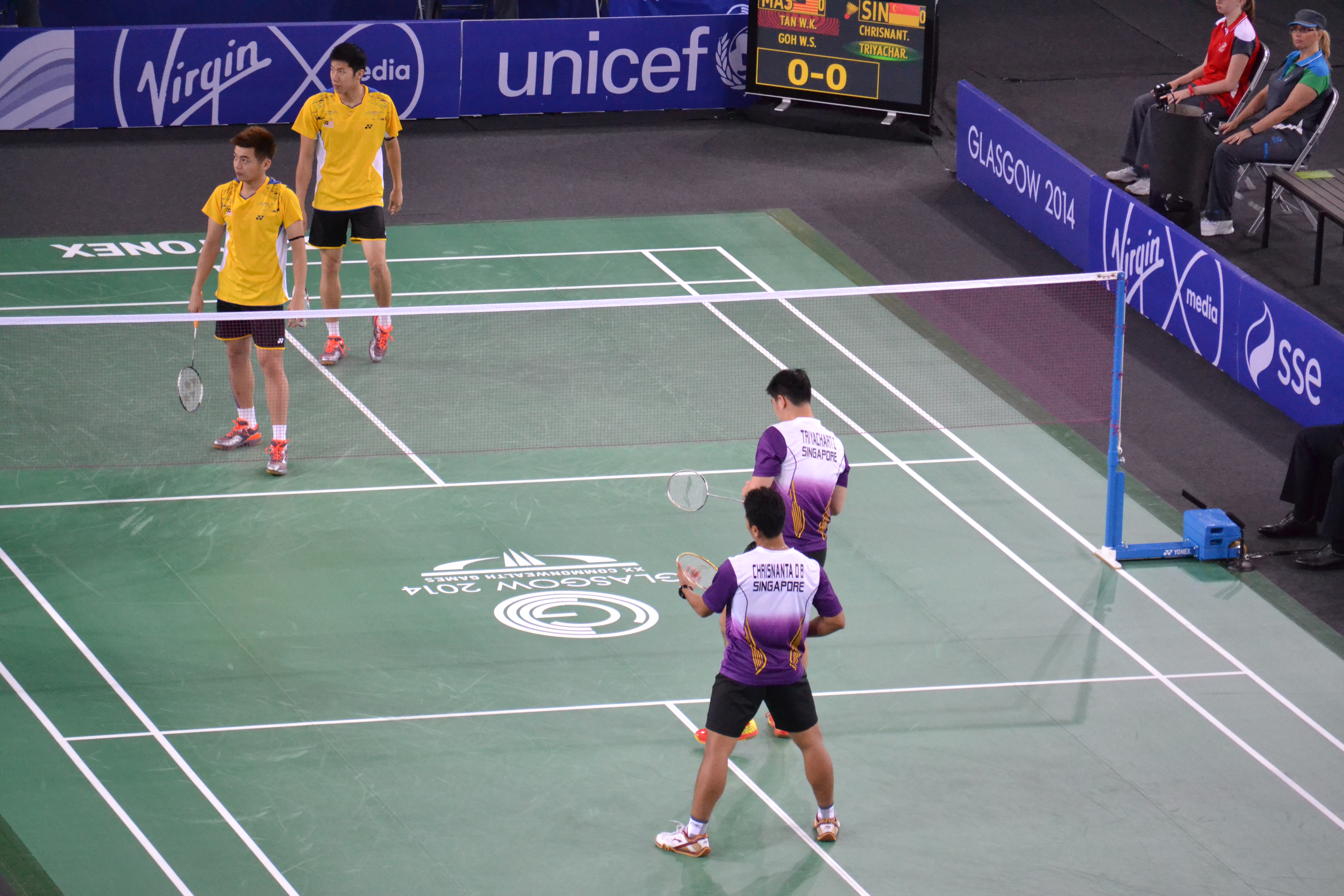

Personal information
- Born: 9 October 1989 (age 37) Udon Thani, Thailand
- Height: 1.82 m (6 ft 0 in)

Sport
- Country: Singapore
- Sport: Badminton
- Handedness: Right

Men's & mixed doubles
- Highest ranking: 16 (MD with Danny Bawa Chrisnanta 16 April 2015); 16 (XD with Yao Lei 23 September 2010)
Medal record
Men's badminton
Representing Singapore
Commonwealth Games
Silver medal – second place	2014 Glasgow	Men's doubles
Bronze medal – third place	2010 Delhi	Mixed doubles
Bronze medal – third place	2014 Glasgow	Mixed team
Southeast Asian Games
Bronze medal – third place	2011 Jakarta–Palembang	Men's team
Bronze medal – third place	2015 Singapore	Men's doubles
Bronze medal – third place	2015 Singapore	Men's team

Chayut Triyachart (born 9 October 1989) is a Thai-born Singaporean former badminton player. At the Commonwealth Games, he won a silver medal in the 2014 men's doubles, and two bronze medals in the 2014 mixed team and 2010 mixed doubles.

In July 2015, Triyachart suffered a partial tear in his achilles tendon and struggled to recover from his injury. With the setback, he decided to quit professional badminton.

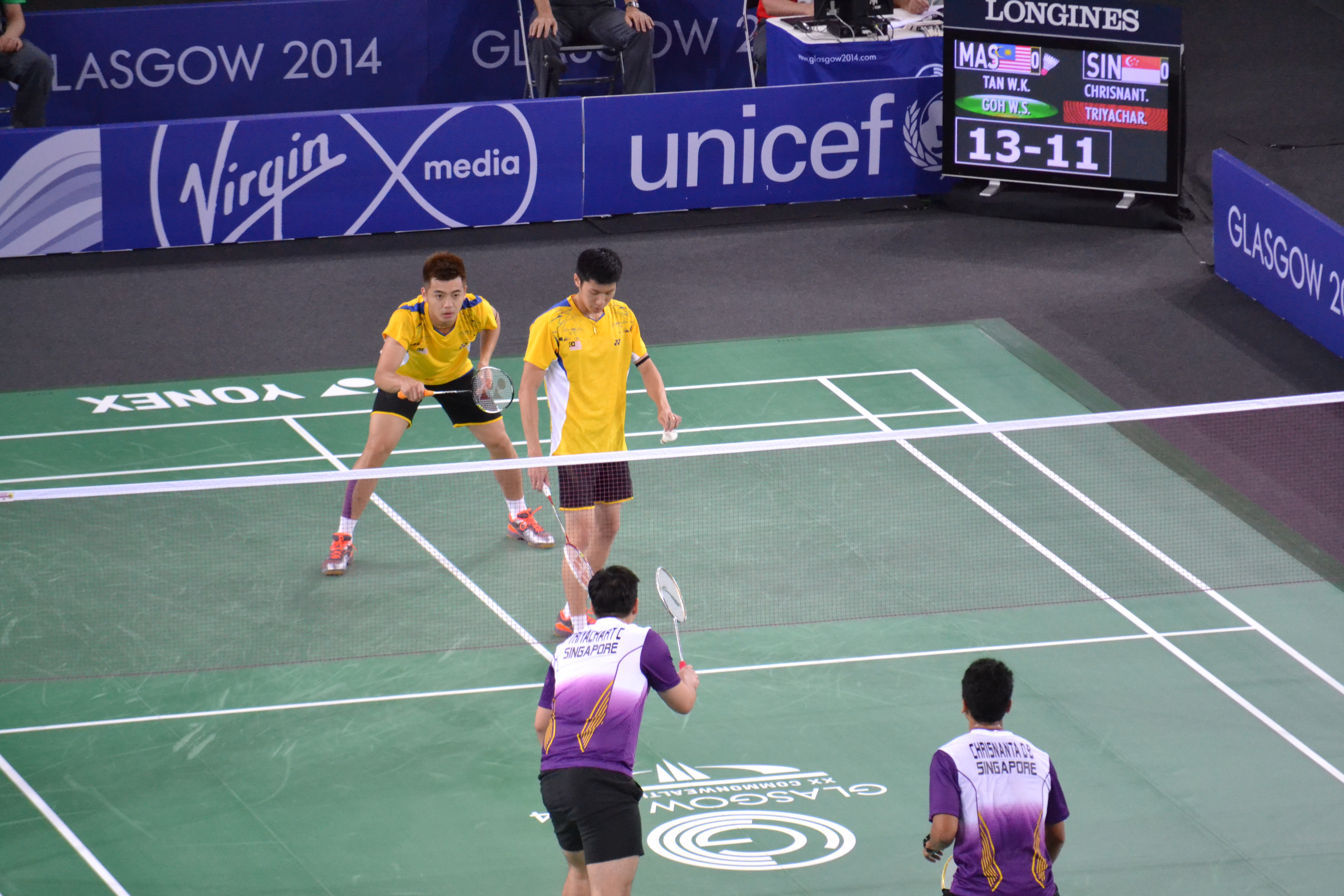
Triyachart and Danny Bawa Chrisnanta against Malaysian pair during the final of 2014 Commonwealth Games

== Achievements ==
=== Commonwealth Games ===
Men's doubles
Year	Venue	Partner	Opponent	Score	Result
2014	Emirates Arena, Glasgow, Scotland	(Singapore) Danny Bawa Chrisnanta	(Malaysia) Goh V Shem (Malaysia) Tan Wee Kiong	12–21, 21–12, 15–21	Silver

Mixed doubles
Year	Venue	Partner	Opponent	Score	Result
2010	Siri Fort Sports Complex, New Delhi, India	(Singapore) Yao Lei	(Malaysia) Chan Peng Soon (Malaysia) Goh Liu Ying	21–14, 17–21, 21–17	Bronze

=== Southeast Asian Games ===
Men's doubles
Year	Venue	Partner	Opponent	Score	Result
2015	Singapore Indoor Stadium, Singapore	(Singapore) Danny Bawa Chrisnanta	(Indonesia) Angga Pratama (Indonesia) Ricky Karanda Suwardi	12–21, 18–21	Bronze

=== BWF Grand Prix ===
The BWF Grand Prix had two levels, the BWF Grand Prix and Grand Prix Gold. It was a series of badminton tournaments sanctioned by the Badminton World Federation (BWF) which was held from 2007 to 2017.

Men's doubles
Year	Tournament	Partner	Opponent	Score	Result
2010	Canada Open	(Singapore) Hendri Kurniawan Saputra	(Chinese Taipei) Fang Chieh-min (Chinese Taipei) Lee Sheng-mu	16–21, 16–21	(silver) Runner-up
2011	Vietnam Open	(Singapore) Danny Bawa Chrisnanta	(Indonesia) Angga Pratama (Indonesia) Rian Agung Saputro	12–21, 21–16, 19–21	(silver) Runner-up
2014	Malaysia Grand Prix Gold	(Singapore) Danny Bawa Chrisnanta	(Malaysia) Goh V Shem (Malaysia) Lim Khim Wah	21–17, 22–20	(gold) Winner
2014	Macau Open	(Singapore) Danny Bawa Chrisnanta	(Indonesia) Angga Pratama (Indonesia) Ricky Karanda Suwardi	21–19, 22–20	(gold) Winner

Mixed doubles
Year	Tournament	Partner	Opponent	Score	Result
2010	India Open	(Singapore) Yao Lei	(India) Valiyaveetil Diju (India) Jwala Gutta	21–23, 22–20, 7–21	(silver) Runner-up

BWF Grand Prix Gold tournament
BWF Grand Prix tournament

=== BWF International Challenge/Series ===
Men's doubles
Year	Tournament	Partner	Opponent	Score	Result
2007	Ballarat International	(Singapore) Riky Widianto	(Australia) Ashley Brehaut (Australia) Aji Basuki Sindoro	16–21, 15–21	(silver) Runner-up
2008	Singapore International	(Singapore) Danny Bawa Chrisnanta	(Indonesia) Fernando Kurniawan (Indonesia) Lingga Lie	12–21, 21–17, 19–21	(silver) Runner-up
2009	Singapore International	(Singapore) Danny Bawa Chrisnanta	(South Korea) Heo Hoon-hoi (South Korea) Lee Jae-jin	22–20, 18–21, 16–21	(silver) Runner-up
2010	Banuinvest International	(Singapore) Danny Bawa Chrisnanta	(Austria) Jürgen Koch (Austria) Peter Zauner	16–21, 15–21	(silver) Runner-up
2014	Sri Lanka International	(Singapore) Danny Bawa Chrisnanta	(India) Manu Attri (India) B. Sumeeth Reddy	21–17, 21–19	(gold) Winner

Mixed doubles
Year	Tournament	Partner	Opponent	Score	Result
2007	Ballarat International	(Singapore) Shinta Mulia Sari	(Singapore) Riky Widianto (Singapore) Vanessa Neo	19–21, 16–21	(silver) Runner-up
2007	Waikato International	(Singapore) Shinta Mulia Sari	(Singapore) Riky Widianto (Singapore) Vanessa Neo	21–16, 21–19	(gold) Winner
2008	Singapore International	(Singapore) Shinta Mulia Sari	(Singapore) Riky Widianto (Singapore) Yao Lei	17–21, 18–21	(silver) Runner-up
2008	Indonesia International	(Singapore) Yao Lei	(Indonesia) Fran Kurniawan (Indonesia) Shendy Puspa Irawati	19–21, 13–21	(silver) Runner-up
2010	Banuinvest International	(Singapore) Yao Lei	(Belgium) Wouter Claes (Belgium) Nathalie Descamps	21–13, 23–21	(gold) Winner
2010	Polish International	(Singapore) Yao Lei	(Russia) Andrey Ashmarin (Russia) Anastasia Prokopenko	12–21, 17–21	(silver) Runner-up
2011	Kharkiv International	(Singapore) Yao Lei	(Germany) Michael Fuchs (Germany) Birgit Michels	18–21, 14–21	(silver) Runner-up
2011	Belgian International	(Singapore) Yao Lei	(Netherlands) Jorrit de Ruiter (Netherlands) Selena Piek	23–25, 21–16, 21–14	(gold) Winner
2012	Singapore International	(Malaysia) Ng Hui Ern	(Chinese Taipei) Tseng Min-hao (Chinese Taipei) Lai Chia-wen	16–21, 14–21	(silver) Runner-up

BWF International Challenge tournament
BWF International Series tournament
