= Shooting at the 2010 Commonwealth Games – Men's 25 metre rapid fire pistol singles =

The Men's 25 metre rapid fire pistol singles event of the 2010 Commonwealth Games took place on 8 October 2010, at the CRPF Campus. There was a qualification held to determine the final participants.

== Results ==
Rank	Name	Country	Stage 1	Stage 2	Final	Total
1st place, gold medalist(s)	Vijay Kumar	India	295	288	204.5	787.5 (FGR)
2nd place, silver medalist(s)	Hasli Amir Hasan	Malaysia	289	287	184.3	760.3
3rd place, bronze medalist(s)	Gurpreet Singh	India	289	280	189.7	758.7
4	Hafiz Adzha	Malaysia	286	278	194.2	758.2
5	Metodi Igorov	Canada	280	284	192.1	756.1
6	David Chapman	Australia	279	286	190.6	755.6
