= Marilou Dozois-Prévost =

Canadian weightlifter (born 1986)

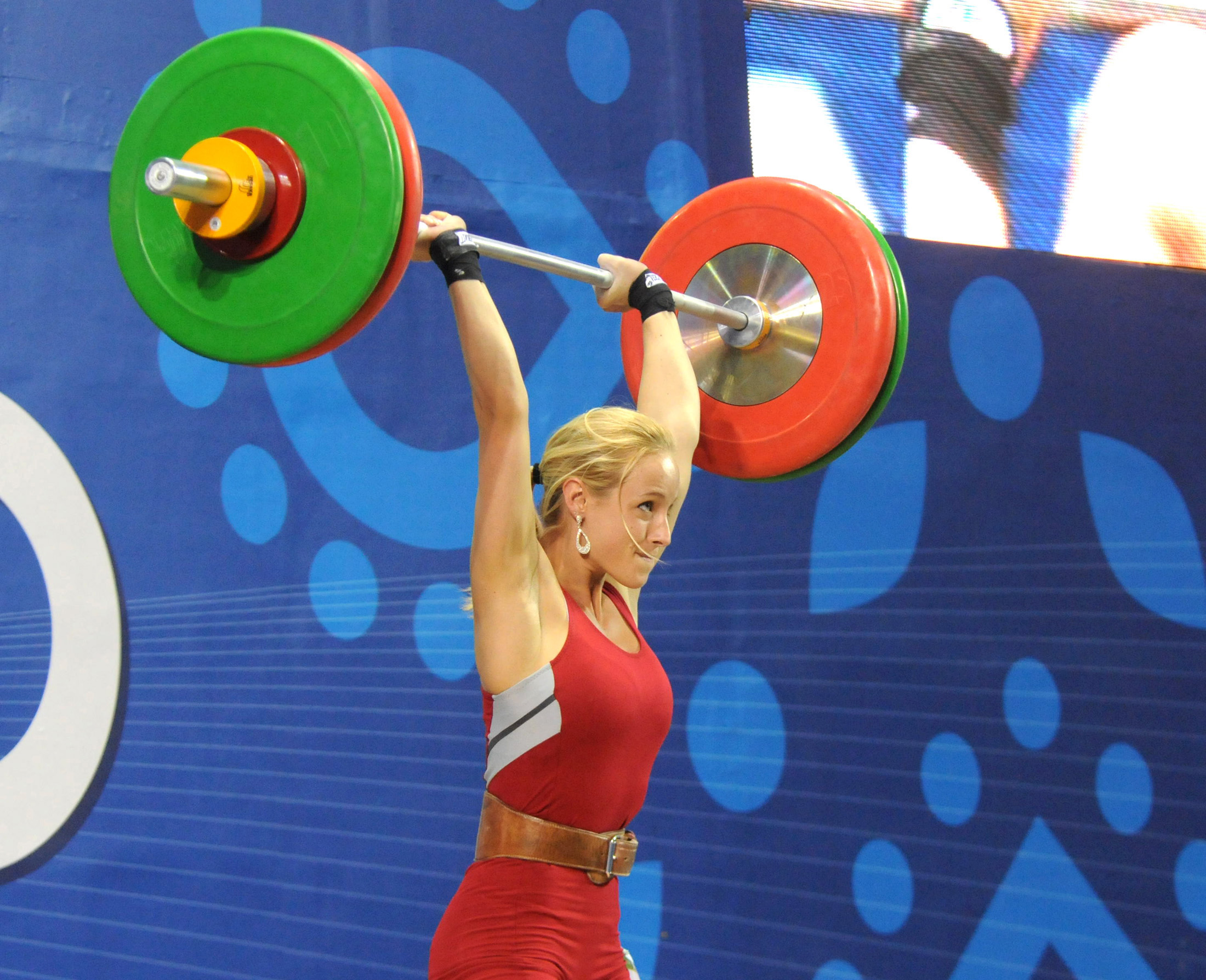
- Marilou Dozois Prevost completed a lift at the women’s 53 kg category weightlifting and won the Gold Medal in XIX Commonwealth Games-2010 in New Delhi on October 05, 2010

Personal information
- Born: May 11, 1986 (age 40) Montreal, Quebec, Canada
Medal record
Women's Weightlifting
Commonwealth Games
Gold medal – first place	2010 Delhi	Women's 53 kg
Silver medal – second place	2006 Melbourne	Women's 48 kg

Marilou Dozois-Prévost (born May 11, 1986) is a Canadian weightlifter. Dozois-Prévost won a silver medal in the women's 48 kg division at the 2006 Commonwealth Games in Melbourne, Australia. She finished in 10th place on the 48 kg event at the 2008 Summer Olympics in Beijing. She won the gold medal at the Commonwealth game in New-Delhi in 2010. Prevost was born in Montreal, Quebec.
