= Cycling at the 2010 Commonwealth Games – Men's 1 km time trial =

The Men's 1 km time trial took place at 5 October 2010 at the Indira Gandhi Arena.

== Results ==
Rank	Rider	Time	Average Speed (km/h)
1st place, gold medalist(s)	Scott Sunderland (AUS)	1:01.411 (CWG)	58.621
2nd place, silver medalist(s)	Mohd Rizal Tisin (MAS)	1:02.768	57.354
3rd place, bronze medalist(s)	Edward James Dawkins (NZL)	1:02.777	57.345
4	Myron Simpson (NZL)	1:03.449	56.738
5	Travis Smith (CAN)	1:03.656	56.553
6	Bernard Pierre Esterhuizen (RSA)	1:04.421	55.882
7	Marc Ryan (NZL)	1:04.521	55.795
8	Callum Skinner (SCO)	1:05.095	55.303
9	Bikram Singh (IND)	1:07.911	53.010
10	Philip Lavery (NIR)	1:08.985	52.185
11	Rakesh Kumar (IND)	1:09.229	52.001
12	Prince Hylem (IND)	1:09.977	51.445
13	Adam Armstrong (NIR)	1:11.659	50.237
