= Sean Downey =

Irish former road racing cyclist

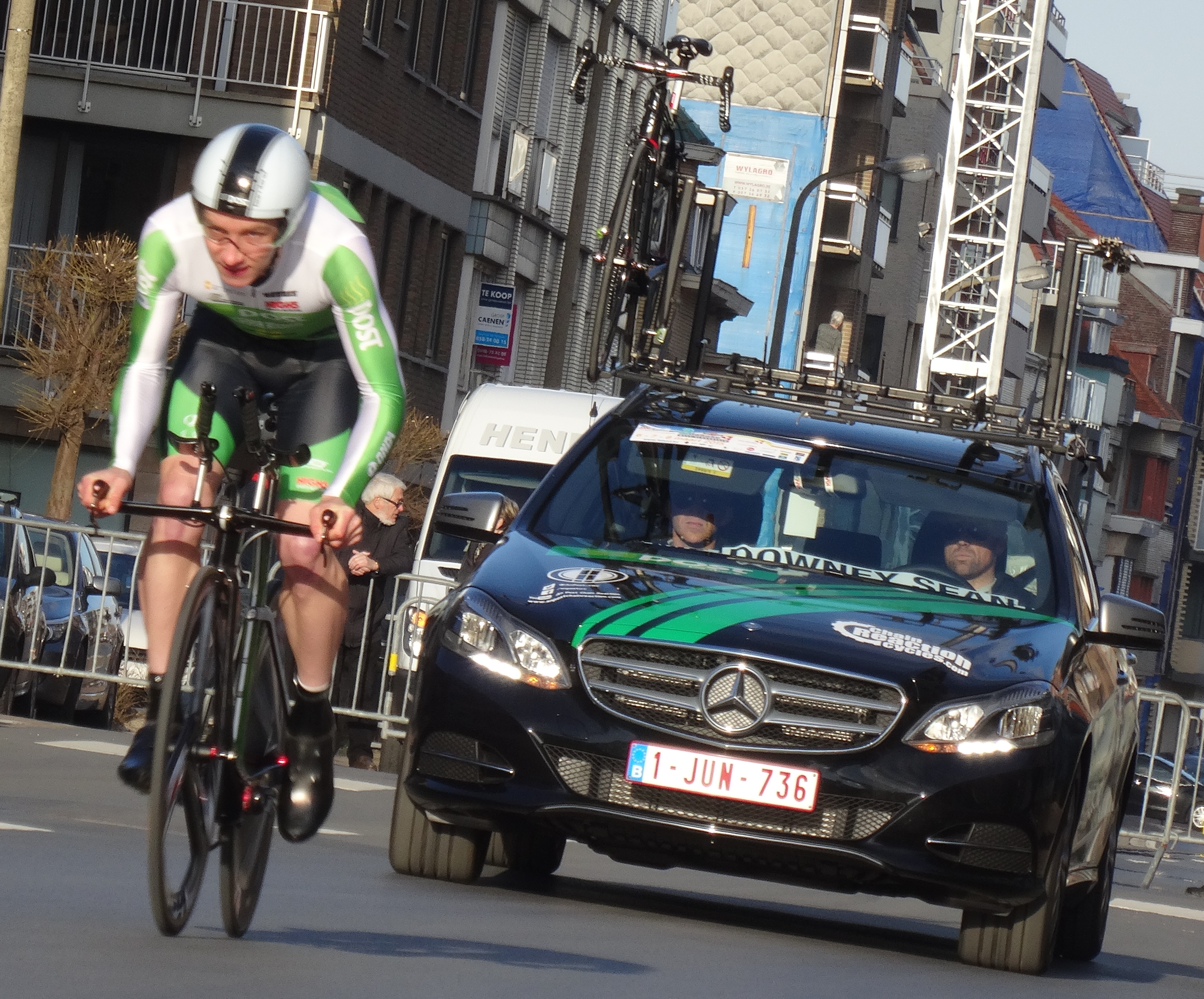

Personal information
- Full name: Sean Patrick Downey
- Born: 10 July 1990 (age 36) Dromore, County Down, Northern Ireland

Cycling career
- Sport: Cycling
- Current team: Retired
- Disciplines: Road, track
- Role: Rider

Amateur teams
- 2008–2009: World Cycling Centre
- 2010: Vélo-Club La Pomme Marseille
- 2011: Côtes d'Armor–Marie Morin

Professional team
- 2012–2015: An Post–Sean Kelly
Medal record
Men's track cycling
Representing Northern Ireland
Commonwealth Games
Bronze medal – third place	2010 Delhi	Team pursuit

Sean Patrick Downey (born 10 July 1990) is a former professional road racing cyclist from Dromore, County Down, Northern Ireland. He won a bronze medal in the 2010 Commonwealth Games in the team pursuit as part of the Northern Ireland team.

He rode for the An Post–Chain Reaction team between 2012 and 2015.

== Major results ==
2007
1st National Junior Time Trial Championships
3rd National Junior Road Race Championships
2008
1st National Junior Time Trial Championships
2009
1st National Under-23 Road Race Championships
2010
3rd Team pursuit, Commonwealth Games
2011
1st National Under-23 Time Trial Championships
2012
2nd National Under-23 Road Race Championships
2nd National Under-23 Time Trial Championships
8th Overall Kreiz Breizh Elites
2013
5th Circuit de Wallonie
2014
2nd National Road Race Championships
6th Overall Rás Tailteann
