= Aricco Jumitih =

Malaysian weightlifter

Medal record

Men's weightlifting

Representing Malaysia

Commonwealth Games
Gold medal – first place	2010 Delhi	-62 kg

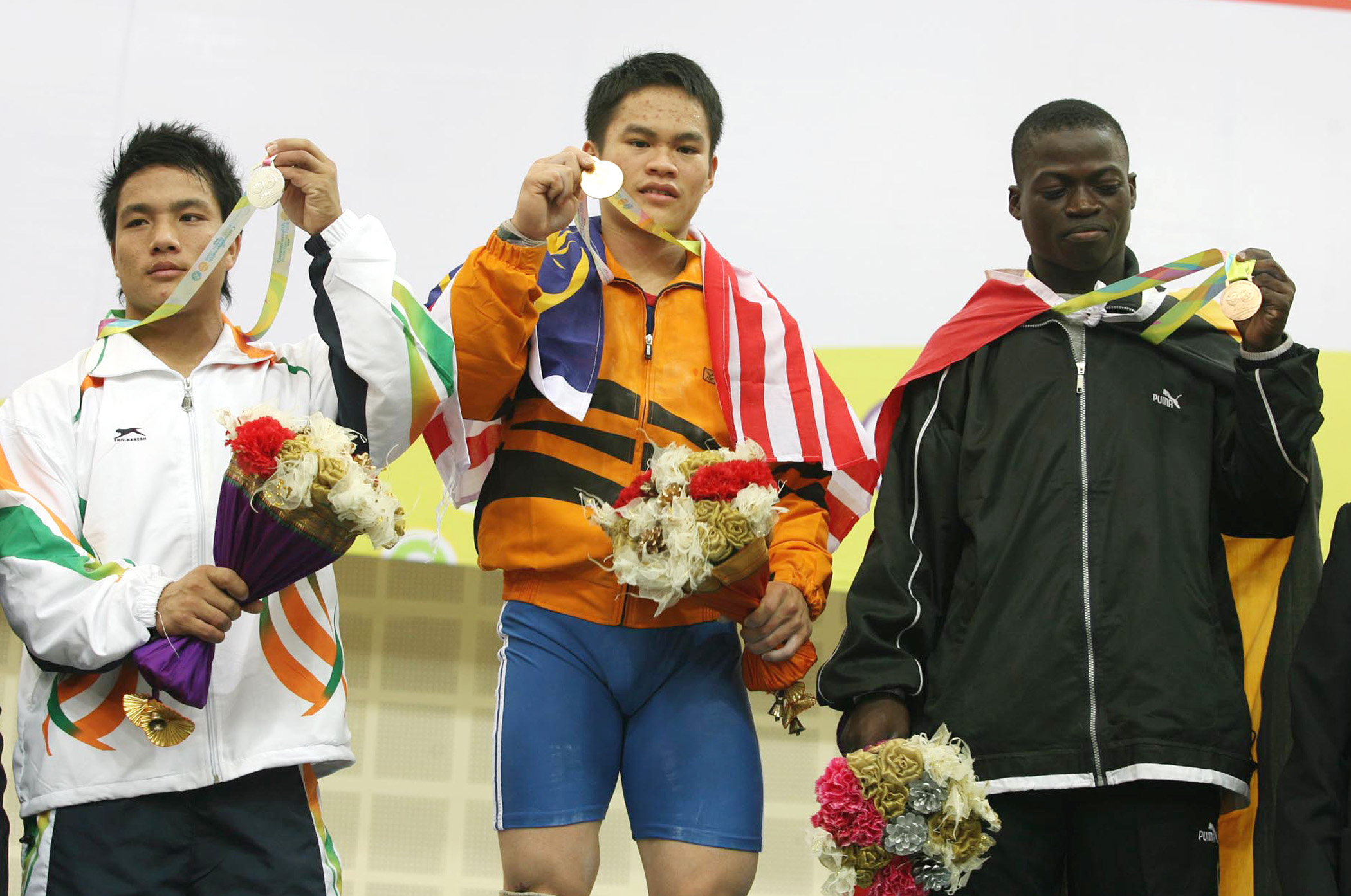
Aricco Jumitih at the 3rd Commonwealth Youth Games, October 2008

Aricco Jumitih is a Malaysian weightlifter. He won the gold medal at the 2010 Commonwealth Games in the Men's 62 kg event.

He caused a minor controversy during the 2010 Games when he wore a jersey bearing the flag of his home state Sabah instead of the Malaysian national flag when competing for the event.
