= Martin Knight (squash player) =

New Zealand squash player (born 1983)

Personal information
- Born: 28 December 1983 (age 42) Wellington, New Zealand
- Height: 1.76 m (5 ft 9 in)
- Weight: 75 kg (165 lb)
- Website: martin-knight.com

Sport
- Country: New Zealand
- Handedness: Right Handed
- Turned pro: 2003
- Coached by: Paul Hornsby
- Retired: Active
- Racquet used: Black Knight

Men's singles
- Highest ranking: No. 38 (March 2010)
- Current ranking: No. 75 (July 2016)
- Title: 4
- Tour final: 11
Medal record
Men's squash
Representing New Zealand
Commonwealth Games
Silver medal – second place	2010 Delhi	Mixed doubles
- Updated on July 2016

Martin Knight (born 28 December 1983 in Wellington) is a New Zealand professional squash player. He reached a career-high world ranking of World No. 38 in March 2010. He won a bronze medal in the men's doubles at the 2006 World Doubles and a silver medal in the mixed doubles at the 2010 Commonwealth Games.
