= Graeme Hatcher =

Australian rules footballer

Personal information
- Full name: Graeme J. Hatcher
- Born: 11 February 1957 (age 69)
- Original team: Hopetoun
- Height: 193 cm (6 ft 4 in)
- Weight: 85 kg (187 lb)
- Position: Ruckman

Playing career^{1}
Years	Club	Games (Goals)
1975–76	Essendon	9 (0)
- ^{1} Playing statistics correct to the end of 1976.

Graeme Hatcher (born 11 February 1957) is a former Australian rules footballer who played with Essendon in the Victorian Football League (VFL). He later played with Clarence in Tasmania, and was then captain-coach of several Victorian country sides – Hopetoun, Woomelang-Lascelles and Warracknabeal.
