= Benjamin Khor =

Malaysian sport shooter

Benjamin Khor Cheng Jie
Personal information
- Born: 16 February 1993 (age 33) United Kingdom
- Height: 1.75 m (5 ft 9 in)
- Weight: 70 kg (150 lb; 11 st)

Sport
- Country: Malaysia
- Sport: Shooting
- Event: Double trap
Medal record
Representing Malaysia
Men's double trap
Conmonwealth Games
Bronze medal – third place	2010 New Delhi	Men's pair
Southeast Asian Games
Gold medal – first place	2017 Kuala Lumpur	Men's pair

Benjamin Khor Cheng Jie (born 16 February 1993 in United Kingdom) is a double trap shooter who represents Malaysia. His father, Edward who he says is also the most influential person in his career, has represented Malaysia in shooting and encouraged Benjamin to take up the sport.
