= Siri Fort Sports Complex =

Sports stadium in New Delhi, India

Siri Fort Sport Complex
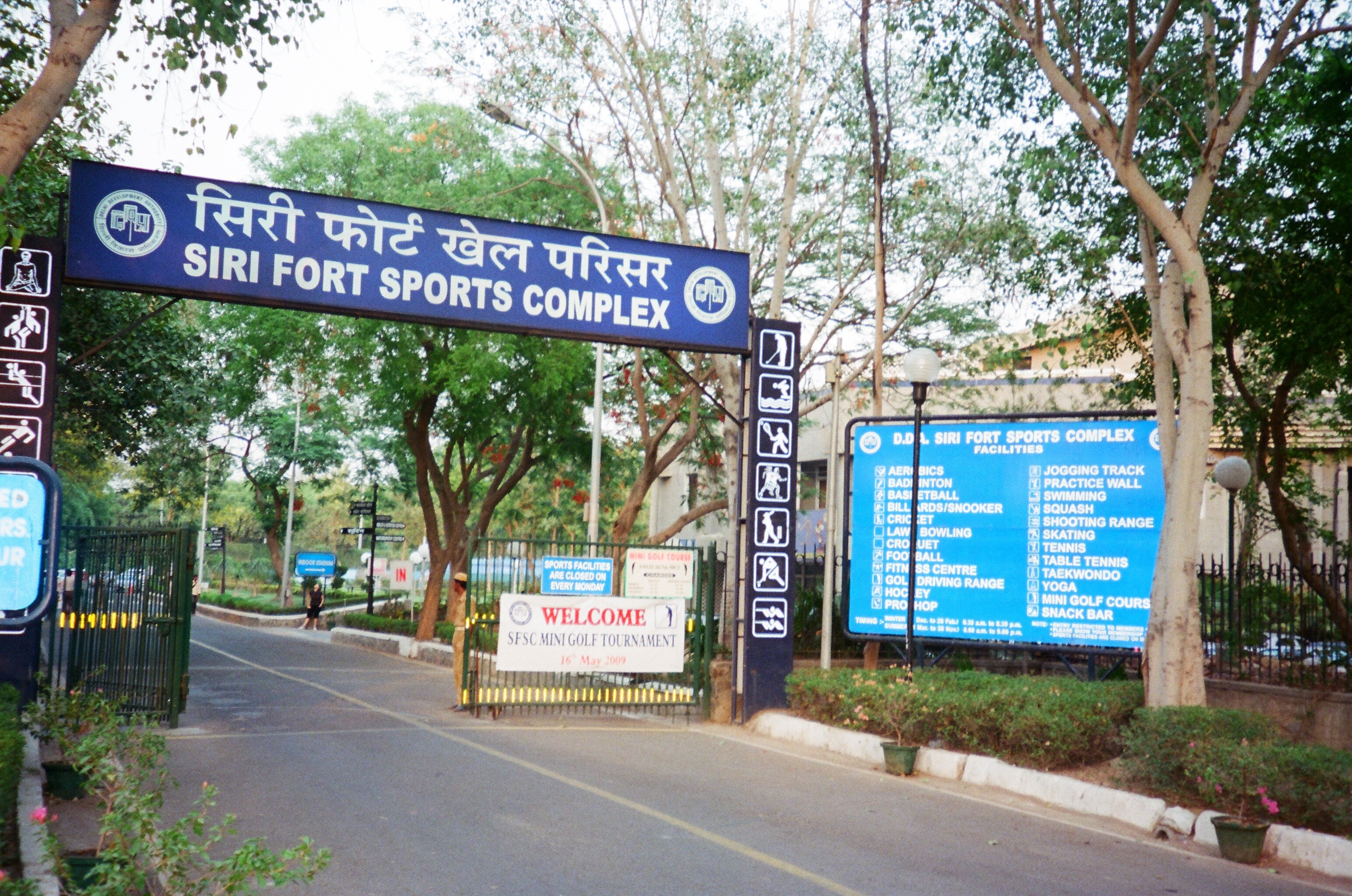
- Interactive map of Siri Fort Sport Complex
- Location: (India) New Delhi
- Coordinates: 28.552083°N 77.219255°E
- Capacity: 5,740

Construction
- Opened: 1982
- Renovated: 2009

The DDA Siri Fort Sport Complex is a sports stadium in New Delhi, India. It was built for the 1982 Asian Games, next to the Asian Games village by the Delhi Development Authority (DDA), which also runs the facility now. Also close by is the Siri Fort Auditorium complex.

== Sports ==
Basketball, Swimming Pool, Squash, Pitch and Putt Golf, Billiards, Snooker, Shooting, Skating, Tennis, Badminton Courts, Yoga, Aerobics, Gym, Calisthenics, Football, Cricket, Jogging track etc.

== 2010 Commonwealth Games ==
The stadium hosted badminton and squash for the Games. The stadium for badminton will have five match courts and three warm-up courts, and the stadium for squash will have 11 singles courts convertible to five doubles courts.

== 2014 Thomas & Uber Cup ==
The 2014 Thomas & Uber Cup was held on 18–25 May 2014 at the Siri Fort Sports Complex, New Delhi. This is the first time India hosted the two cups.

== See also ==
- 2010 Commonwealth Games
- 2014 Thomas & Uber Cup
- Jawaharlal Nehru Stadium, Delhi
