= Bangladesh at the 2010 Commonwealth Games =

- CGF code: BAN
- CGA: Bangladesh Olympic Association
- Website: nocban.com

in Delhi, India
- Competitors: 70
- Flag bearers: Opening: Closing:
- Medals: Gold 0 Silver 0 Bronze 1 Total 1

Commonwealth Games appearances (overview)
- 1978; 1982–1986; 1990; 1994; 1998; 2002; 2006; 2010; 2014; 2018; 2022; 2026; 2030

Bangladesh competed in the 2010 Commonwealth Games that were held in Delhi.

== Medalists ==
Medal	Name	Sport	Event	Date
Bronze	Abdullah Hel Baki and Md. Asif Hossain Khan	Shooting	Men's 10 m Air Rifle	October 7

== Bangladesh's Commonwealth Games Team 2010 ==
=== Aquatics ===
==== Swimming ====
===== Women's =====
- Mahfuza Khatun

== See also ==
- Bangladesh at the 2006 Commonwealth Games
