= Isle of Man at the 2010 Commonwealth Games =

Sporting event delegation

Flag of the Isle of Man

The Isle of Man competed in the 2010 Commonwealth Games held in Delhi, India, from 3 to 14 October 2010.

== Medals ==
	(gold)	(silver)	(bronze)	Total
Isle of Man	0	0	2	2

== Medalist ==
Medal	Name	Sport	Event
Bronze	Mark Christian	Cycling	Men's 40km points race
Bronze	Tim Kneale	Shooting	Men's Double Trap

== Archery ==
Team Isle of Man consists of 3 archers.

Adrian Bruce, Aalin George, Sarah Rigby

== Badminton ==
Team Isle of Man consists of 4 badminton players.

Cristen Callow, Kim Clague, Josh Green, Matt Wilkinson

== Boxing ==
Team Isle of Man consists of 2 boxers.

Krystian Borucki, Dominic Winrow

== Cycling ==
Team Isle of Man consists of 8 cyclists.

Mark Cavendish, Mark Christian, Graeme Hatcher, Peter Kennaugh, Tim Kennaugh, Andrew Roche, Chris Whorrall, Tom Black

== Gymnastics ==
Team Isle of Man consists of 5 gymnasts.

Alex Hedges, Mukunda Measuria, Joe Smith, Adam Hedges, Olivia Curran

== Shooting ==
Team Isle of Man consists of 11 shooters.

Clementine Kermode Clague, Harry Creevy, Jake Keeling, Gemma Kermode, Tim Kneale,
Dave Moore, Neil Parsons, Dan Shacklock, Lara Ward, Steven Watterson, David Walton

== See also ==
- 2010 Commonwealth Games
