= Canada at the 2010 Commonwealth Games =

- CG code: CAN
- CGA: Commonwealth Games Canada
- Website: commonwealthgames.ca

in Delhi, India
- Competitors: 251 in 15 sports
- Flag bearers: Opening:Ken Pereira; Closing:
- Medals Ranked 4th: Gold 26 Silver 17 Bronze 33 Total 76

Commonwealth Games appearances (overview)
- 1930; 1934; 1938; 1950; 1954; 1958; 1962; 1966; 1970; 1974; 1978; 1982; 1986; 1990; 1994; 1998; 2002; 2006; 2010; 2014; 2018; 2022; 2026; 2030

Other related appearances
- Newfoundland (1930, 1934)

Canada competed in the 2010 Commonwealth Games which were held in Delhi, India from October 3–14, 2010. Canada competed in 15 out of 17 sports with the exceptions being netball (team did not qualify) and tennis (scheduling conflicts). Canada's team consisted of 251 athletes, which was a decrease of 3 from the 2006 games. However, the events at these games were much more than they were in 2006. Several athletes withdrew due to safety concerns, including medal contenders Priscilla Lopes-Schliep, Perdita Felician and Dietmar Trillus. Ken Pereira, Captain of the Men's field hockey team, was named the flag bearer on September 18, 2010, becoming the first Indo-Canadian and field hockey player to receive the honour.

== Medallists ==
Medal	Name	Sport	Event	Date
Gold	Ryan Cochrane	Aquatics	Men's 400 m freestyle	October 4
Gold	Marilou Dozois-Prevost	Weightlifting	Women's 53 kg	October 5
Gold	Marie-Pier Boudreau Gagnon	Aquatics	Women's solo	October 7
Gold	Marie-Pier Boudreau Gagnon and Chloé Isaac	Aquatics	Women's duet	October 7
Gold	Brent Hayden	Aquatics	Men's 100 m freestyle	October 7
Gold	Sultana Frizell	Athletics	Women's hammer throw	October 7
Gold	Kyle Pettey	Athletics	Men's shot put F32/34/52	October 7
Gold	Dylan Armstrong	Athletics	Men's shot put	October 7
Gold	Carol Huynh	Wrestling	Women's 48 kg	October 7
Gold	Justine Bouchard	Wrestling	Women's 63 kg	October 7
Gold	Ohenewa Akuffo	Wrestling	Women's 72 kg	October 7
Gold	Christine Girard	Weightlifting	Women's 69 kg	October 8
Gold	Diane Roy	Athletics	Women's 1500m T54	October 8
Gold	Jamie Adjetey-Nelson	Athletics	Men's decathlon	October 8
Gold	Brent Hayden	Aquatics	Men's 50 m freestyle	October 9
Gold	Ryan Cochrane	Aquatics	Men's 1500 m freestyle	October 9
Gold	Benoît Huot	Aquatics	Men's 100m Freestyle S10	October 9
Gold	Alice Falaiye	Athletics	Women's long jump	October 10
Gold	Nicole Forrester	Athletics	Women's high jump	October 10
Gold	Alex Despatie	Aquatics	Men's 1 m springboard	October 10
Gold	Jennifer Abel and Emilie Heymans	Aquatics	Women's synchronised 3 m springboard	October 10
Gold	Arjan Bhullar	Wrestling	Men's freestyle 120 kg	October 10
Gold	Alex Despatie	Aquatics	Men's 3 m springboard	October 11
Gold	Jennifer Abel	Aquatics	Women's 1 m springboard	October 12
Gold	Alex Despatie and Reuben Ross	Aquatics	Men's synchronised 3 m springboard	October 12
Gold	Tara Whitten	Cycling	Women's road time trials	October 13
Silver	Jack Bond	Wrestling	Men's Greco-Roman 66 kg	October 6
Silver	Canada; Camille Bouffard-Demers, Doris Jones, and Ashley Wallacet	Archery	Women's team compound	October 7
Silver	Tonya Verbeek	Wrestling	Women's 48 kg	October 8
Silver	Anderson Loran	Gymnastics	Men's horizontal bar	October 8
Silver	Megan Buydens	Wrestling	Women's 67 kg	October 8
Silver	Audrey Lacroix	Aquatics	Women's 200 m butterfly	October 9
Silver	Doris Jones	Archery	Women's individual compound	October 9
Silver	Marie-Eve Beauchemin-Nadeau	Weightlifting	Women's 75 kg	October 9
Silver	James Mancini	Wrestling	Men's 60 kg	October 9
Silver	Korey Jarvis	Wrestling	Men's 96 kg	October 9
Silver	Jessica Zelinka	Athletics	Women's heptathlon	October 9
Silver	Jason Lyon	Archery	Men's recurve individual	October 10
Silver	Reuben Ross	Aquatics	Men's 3 m springboard	October 11
Silver	Angela Whyte	Athletics	Women's 100 m hurdles	October 11
Silver	Jason Hughes Caswell and Richard McBride	Shooting	Men's skeet pairs	October 11
Silver	Jennifer Abel	Aquatics	Women's 3 m springboard	October 13
Silver	Canada	Gymnastics	Women's Rhythmic Team All-Around	October 14
Bronze	Julia Wilkinson	Aquatics	Women's 200 m individual medley	October 4
Bronze	Stefan Hirniak	Aquatics	Men's 200 m butterfly	October 4
Bronze	Canada; Jason Scott, Robert Watson, Tariq Dowers, Anderson Loran, and Ian Galvan	Gymnastics	Men's team	October 4
Bronze	Canada; Gabby May, Cynthia Lemieux-Guillemette, Kristin Klarenbach, Emma Willis, and Catherine Dion	Gymnastics	Women's artistic team	October 5
Bronze	Eric Fuenekes	Wrestling	Men's Greco-Roman 96 kg	October 5
Bronze	Julia Wilkinson	Aquatics	100 m Backstroke	October 6
Bronze	Tara Whitten	Cycling	Team Sprint	October 6
Bronze	Monique Sullivan and Tara Whitten	Cycling	Team Sprint	October 6
Bronze	Promise Mwenga	Wrestling	Men's Greco-Roman 55 kg	October 6
Bronze	Gabby May	Gymnastics	Women's vault	October 7
Bronze	Cynthia Lemieux-Guillemette	Gymnastics	Women's uneven bars	October 7
Bronze	Canada; Marie-Pier Beaudet, Alana Macdougall and Kateri Vrakking	Archery	Women's team recurve	October 8
Bronze	Tabia Charles	Athletics	Women's triple jump	October 8
Bronze	Tara Whitten	Cycling	Women's individual pursuit	October 8
Bronze	Zach Bell	Cycling	Men's 20 km Scratch Race	October 8
Bronze	Ian Galvan	Gymnastics	Men's vault	October 8
Bronze	Cynthia Lemieux-Guillemette	Gymnastics	Women's balance beam	October 8
Bronze	Cynthia Meyer and Susan Nattrass	Shooting	Women's trap pairs	October 8
Bronze	Mathieu Marineau	Weightlifting	Men's 85 kg	October 8
Bronze	Jessica Macdonald	Wrestling	Women's 51 kg	October 8
Bronze	Canada; Julia Wilkinson, Annamay Pierse, Audrey Lacroix, and Victoria Poon	Aquatics	Women's 4 × 100 m medley	October 9
Bronze	Evan MacDonald	Wrestling	Men's freestyle 74 kg	October 9
Bronze	Tabia Charles	Athletics	Women's long jump	October 10
Bronze	Chris Prickett	Wrestling	Men's freestyle 66 kg	October 10
Bronze	Josh Cassidy	Athletics	Men's 1500 m T-54 wheelchair	October 10
Bronze	Adrienne Power	Athletics	Women's 200 m	October 11
Bronze	Diane Cummins	Athletics	Women's 800 m	October 11
Bronze	George Kobaladze	Weightlifting	Men's +105 kg	October 11
Bronze	Dorothy Ludwig and Lynda Hare	Shooting	Women's 10 m air pistol pairs	October 12
Bronze	Emilie Heymans	Aquatics	Women's 1 m springboard	October 12
Bronze	Carly Dockendorf	Athletics	Women's pole vault	October 12
Bronze	Kelsie Hendry	Athletics	Women's pole vault	October 12
Bronze	Canada; Amonn Nelson, Adrienne Power, Vicki Tolton and Carline Muir	Athletics	Women's 4 x 400 m relay	October 11

Medals by sport
Sport	gold	silver	bronze	Total
Aquatics	12	3	5	20
Athletics	7	2	8	17
Wrestling	4	5	5	14
Weightlifting	2	1	2	5
Cycling	1	0	4	5
Archery	0	3	1	4
Gymnastics	0	2	6	8
Shooting	0	1	2	3

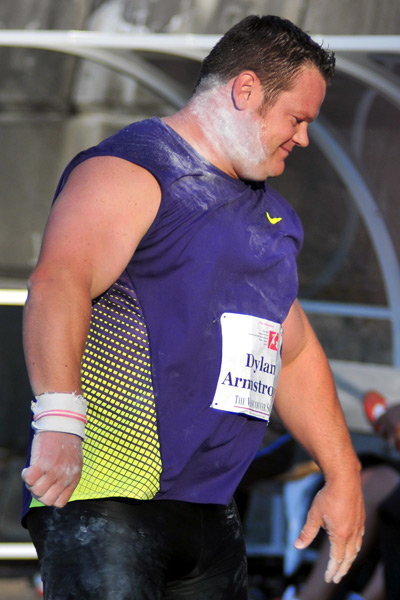
Dylan Armstrong won the men's shot put

== Archery ==
Canada sent 10 archers to the 2010 commonwealth games. Kevin Tataryn and Dietmar Trillus on September 22, 2010, withdrew, due to safety concerns. The replacements Nathan Cameron and Michael Schleppe were announced on September 24, 2010.

Men

Athlete	Event	Ranking Round		Round of 32	Round of 16	Quarterfinals	Semifinals	Final	Rank
Athlete	Event	Score	Seed	Opposition Score	Opposition Score	Opposition Score	Opposition Score	Opposition Score	Rank
Crispin Duenas	Recurve individual	663	5	(India) Lakmal Rajasinghe (IND); W 4-2	(Australia) Matthew Gray (AUS); L 0-4	-	-	-	-
Jason Lyon	Recurve individual	674	3	(Mauritius) Jean Babet (MRI); W 4-0	(Scotland) James Laing (SCO); W 4-2	(England) Larry Godfrey (ENG); W 7-3	(India) Jayanta Talukdar (IND); W 6-0	(India) Rahul Banerjee (IND); L 6-5	2nd place, silver medalist(s)
Hugh MacDonald	Recurve individual	631	22	(England) Wills (ENG); L 0-4	-	-	-	-	-
Nathan Cameron	Compound individual	684	23	(Australia) Robert Timms (AUS); L 4-0					
Andrew Fagan	Compound individual	699	7	(Trinidad and Tobago) George Vire (TRI); W 4-0	(Australia) Robert Timms (AUS); L 2-4	-	-	-	-
Michael Schleppe	Compound individual	696	11	(Scotland) Kyle Dods (SCO); W 4-2	(New Zealand) Shaun Teasdale (NZL); W 4-2	-	-	-	-
Crispin Duenas; Jason Lyon; Hugh MacDonald	Team recurve					Australia; 216-218			
Nathan Cameron, Andrew Fagan, Michael Schleppe	Team compound				Malaysia; 225-230				

Women

Athlete	Event	Ranking Round		Round of 32	Round of 16	Quarterfinals	Semifinals	Final	Rank
Athlete	Event	Score	Seed	Opposition Score	Opposition Score	Opposition Score	Opposition Score	Opposition Score	Rank
Marie-Pier Beaudet	Recurve individual	574	20						
Alana MacDougall	Recurve individual	614	10						
Kateri Vrakking	Recurve individual	598	14						
Camille Bouffard-Demers	Compound individual	681	9						
Doris Jones	Compound individual	698	1						2nd place, silver medalist(s)
Ashley Wallace	Compound individual	686	7						
Marie-Pier Beaudet, Alana MacDougall, Kateri Vrakking	Team recurve					Australia; 205-201	England; 200-208	Malaysia; 202-192	3rd place, bronze medalist(s)
Camille Bouffard-Demers, Doris Jones, Ashley Wallace	Team compound					Wales; 223-222	India; 224-217	England; 228-232	2nd place, silver medalist(s)

== Athletics ==
Canada sent a team of 40 athletes to the 2010 Commonwealth Games

Men

Athlete(s)	Events	Round 1		Round 2		Semifinal		Final	
Athlete(s)	Events	Result	Rank	Result	Rank	Result	Rank	Result	Rank
Jared Connaughton	100 m	-	-	-	-	-	-	-	-
Jared Connaughton	200 m	20.97	1	20.60	1	20.65	4	20.62	4
Sam Effah	100 m	10.28	4	10.15	3	10.16	4	10.37	7
Taylor Milne	1500 m	3:49.53	20	DNQ					
Josh Cassidy	T54 1500 m	-	-	-	-	-	-	3:21.14	3rd place, bronze medalist(s)
Jean-Paul Compaore	T54 1500 m	-	-	-	-	-	-	3:21.45	5
Bryan Barnett; Jared Connaughton; Sam Effah; Hank Palmer; Oluseyi Smith	4 × 100 metre relay	38.45	1					DSQ	
Evan Dunfee	20 km walk							1:28:13	6
Inaki Gomez	20 km walk							1:27:09	5
Michael Mason	High jump	2.16m	T-1					2.20m	7
Jason Wurster	Pole vault	-	-					5.25	7
Dylan Armstrong	Shot put	20.01m	1					21.02m	1st place, gold medalist(s)
Kyle Pettey	F34 shot put	-	-					11.44	1st place, gold medalist(s)
Jamie Adjetey-Nelson	Decathlon							8070	1st place, gold medalist(s)

Decathlon

Decathlon	Event	Jamie Adjetey-Nelson		
Decathlon	Event	Results	Points	Rank
	100 m	10.87	890	1
	Long jump	7.37m	903	2
	Shot put	15.0m	790	1
	High jump	2.02m	822	5
	400 m	49.61	833	4
	110 m hurdles	14.76	879	2
	Discus throw	45.21m	771	2
	Pole vault	4.70m	819	3
	Javelin throw	61.32m	758	3
	1500 m	4:52.23	605	8
Final			8070	1st place, gold medalist(s)

Women

Athlete(s)	Events	Round 1		Round 2		Semifinal		Final	
Athlete(s)	Events	Result	Rank	Result	Rank	Result	Rank	Result	Rank
Leah Robinson	T37 100 m	-	-	-	-	-	-	15.27	5
Megan Muscat	T37 100 m	-	-	-	-	-	-	15.73	7
Angela Whyte	100m hurdles	13.09	2	-	-	-	-	12.98	2nd place, silver medalist(s)
Adrienne Power	200 m	23.67	5	-	-	23.59	5	23.52	3rd place, bronze medalist(s)
Carline Muir	400 m	52.21	4			52.55	6	52:43	7
Amonn Nelson	400 m	54.26	16			53.33	13	-	-
Diane Cummins	800m	2:02.25	3	-	-	-	-	2:00.13	3rd place, bronze medalist(s)
Nicole Edwards	1500m	4:13.90	12					4:08.16	5
Hilary Stellingwerff	1500m	4:13.01	8					4:12.87	11
Diane Roy	T54 1500 m	-	-	-	-	-	-	3:53.95	1st place, gold medalist(s)
Megan Wright	5000m	-	-	-	-	-	-	16:55.86	8
Ruky Abdulai; Diane Cummins; Carline Muir; Amonn Nelson; Adrienne Power; Vicki Tolton	4 × 400 metre relay	3:33.42	3					3:30.20	3rd place, bronze medalist(s)
Ruky Abdulai	Long jump	6.46m	2					6.13m	10
Tabia Charles	Long jump	6.29m	7					6.44	3rd place, bronze medalist(s)
Tabia Charles	Triple jump	-	-					13.84m	3rd place, bronze medalist(s)
Alice Falaiye	Long jump	6.32m	5					6.50	1st place, gold medalist(s)
Carly Dockendorf	Pole vault	-	-					4.25m	3rd place, bronze medalist(s)
Gabriella Duclos-Lasnier	Pole vault	-	-					4.10m	8
Kelsie Hendry	Pole vault	-	-					4.25m	3rd place, bronze medalist(s)
Jillian Drouin	High jump	-	-					1.78m	T-6
Nicole Forrester	High jump	-	-					1.91m	1st place, gold medalist(s)
Sultana Frizell	Hammer throw	63.46	2					68.57	1st place, gold medalist(s)
Megann Rodhe	Hammer throw	62.06	4					62.36	7
Crystal Smith	Hammer throw	60.94	6					59.65	11
Jessica Zelinka	Heptathlon							6100	2nd place, silver medalist(s)

Heptathlon

Heptathlon	Event	Jessica Zelinka		
Heptathlon	Event	Results	Points	Rank
	100 m hurdles	13.19	1096	1
	High jump	1.69m	842	5
	Shot put	13.30m	747	2
	200 m	24.08	973	1
	Long jump	6.01	-	2
	Javelin throw	41.68	-	3
	800 m	2:15.26	-	1
Final			6100	2nd place, silver medalist(s)

== Badminton ==
Canada's Badminton will consist of 11 athletes for the 2010 Commonwealth Games . Joseph Rogers and Milaine Cloutier will also attend as alternates. On September 28, 2010, Alvin Lau withdrew due to educational commitments.

Men

Athlete	Event	Round of 64	Round of 32	Round of 16	Quarterfinals	Semifinals	Final
Athlete	Event	Opposition Score	Opposition Score	Opposition Score	Opposition Score	Opposition Score	Opposition Score
David Snider	Singles	Rasheed (MDV); 2-0	Hashim (MAS); 0-2				
Alexander Pang	Singles	Wogute (UGA); 2-0	Lee (MAS); 0-2				
Toby Ng; Jon Vandervet	Doubles		Karunaratne and Karunaratne (SRI); 2-1	Clark and Robertson (ENG); 0-2			

Women

Athlete	Event	Round of 64	Round of 32	Round of 16	Quarterfinals	Semifinals	Final
Athlete	Event	Opposition Score	Opposition Score	Opposition Score	Opposition Score	Opposition Score	Opposition Score
Anna Rice	Singles	bye	Bruce (CAN); 2-0	Lloyd (GUE); 2-0	Nehwal (IND); 0-2		
Michelle Li	Singles	Lewis (JAM); 2-0	Chambers (NIR); 2-0	Xing (SIN); 2-0	Cann (ENG); 1-2		
Joycelyn Ko	Singles	Clague (IOM); 2-0	Xing (SIN); 0-2				
Alex Bruce	Singles	Nankabirwa (UGA); 2-0	Rice (CAN); 0-2				
Michelle Li; Alex Bruce	Doubles		Ideh and Braimah (NGR); 2-0	Wallwork and White (ENG); 0-2			
Grace Gao; Joycelyn Ko	Doubles		Harvey and Turner (WAL); 2-1	Tang and Wilson-Smith (AUS); 0-2			

Mixed

Athlete	Event	Round of 64	Round of 32	Round of 16	Quarterfinals	Semifinals	Final
Athlete	Event	Opposition Score	Opposition Score	Opposition Score	Opposition Score	Opposition Score	Opposition Score
Toby Ng; Grace Gao	Mixed doubles	bye	Lewis and Thomas (WAL); 2-0	Koo and Chin (MAS); 0-2			
Alexander Pang; Michelle Li	Mixed doubles	Aryee and Tetteh (GHA); 2-0	Briggs and Bankier (SCO); 0-2				
Jon Vandervet; Alex Bruce	Mixed doubles	Beeharry and Aboobakar (MRI); 2-0	Sari and Wijaya (SIN); 0-2				

Mixed Team

Canada was ranked 5th in the draw and drew #3 England, #10 Mauritius, #14 Uganda and tied for #20 (last place) The Falkland Islands. Placing 2nd behind England after the group rounds, Canada lost to India in the Quarterfinals.

Group C

Team	Pts	Pld	W	L	GW	GL
England	8	4	4	0	38	3
Canada	6	4	3	1	33	8
Mauritius	2	4	2	2	18	23
Uganda	2	4	1	3	13	29
Falkland Islands	0	4	0	4	1	40

October 4, 2010
Canada	5-0	Uganda
October 5, 2010
Canada	5-0	Mauritius
October 6, 2010
Canada	5-0	Falkland Islands
England	4-1	Canada

Quarterfinals

October 7, 2010
India	3-0	Canada

== Boxing ==
Canada sent a team of 5 boxers to the 2010 Commonwealth Games On October 1, 2010, it was announced that Colin Fish and Steve Rolls were removed from the team for missing a mandatory training camp.

Athlete	Event	Round of 32	Round of 16	Quarterfinals	Semifinals	Final
Athlete	Event	Opposition Result	Opposition Result	Opposition Result	Opposition Result	Opposition Result
Alejandro Rynn	Lightweight	J Colin (MRI); 7-0	M O'Hara (NIR); 9-5	L Moala (TON); 2-4		
Yves Ulysse Jr.	Light Welterweight	A Rahim (BAN); 6-1	F Lawson (GHA); 5-4	B Saunders (ENG); 4-11		
Custio Clayton	Welterweight	J. Mwaisalenge (TAN); 5-3	A Brown (SCO); 1-4			
Samir El-Mais	Heavyweight	K Evans (WAL); 11-2	D Lorenz (SVG); 11-0	S Simmons (SCO); 4-7		
Didier Bence	Super heavyweight		J Parker (NZL); 7-14			

== Cycling ==
Canada sent a team of 12 Cyclists to the 2010 Commonwealth Games. On October 1, 2010, Alison Testroete withdrew due to an injury.

=== Road ===
Men

Athlete	Event	Time	Rank
Zach Bell	Road race	3:52:42	11
Zach Bell	Time trial	50:35.42	7
Amaud Papillon	Road race	3:54:36	22
Dominique Rollin	Road race	3:50:10	6
Ryan Roth	Road race	3:55:05	25
Ryan Roth	Time trial	52:09.53	10
Will Routley	Road race	3:54:11	19

Women

Athlete	Event	Time	Rank
Julie Beveridge	Road race	2:50:32	36
Julie Beveridge	Time trial	41:30.88	13
Leah Kirchmann	Road race	2:49:38	22
Joëlle Numainville	Road race	2:49:30	6
Tara Whitten	Road race	2:49:30	7
Tara Whitten	Time trial	38:59.30	1st place, gold medalist(s)
Erinne Willock	Road race	2:49:30	13
Erinne Willock	Time trial	41:16.46	11

=== Track ===
Men

- Zach Bell – Men's Points, Scratch
- Travis Smith – 1 km Time Trial, Sprint, Keirin

Women

- Tara Whitten – Women's Individual Pursuit, Points, Scratch, Team Sprint
- Monique Sullivan – 500m/1 km Time Trial, Sprint, Team Sprint

== Diving ==
Canada sent a team of 11 divers to the 2010 Commonwealth Games. However, on September 15, 2010 Riley McCormick withdrew from the event with a back injury. On September 28, 2010, Meaghan Benfeito withdrew due to a lingering back injury, and was replaced with 17-year-old Rachel Kemp.

Men

Athlete	Events	Semifinal		Final	
Athlete	Events	Points	Rank	Points	Rank
Alexandre Despatie	1 m springboard	416.10	1	468.15	1st place, gold medalist(s)
Alexandre Despatie	3 m springboard	485.15	1	513.75	1st place, gold medalist(s)
Kevin Geyson	10 m platform	390.75	7	447.70	4
Reuben Ross	1 m springboard	366.30	5	385.70	5
Reuben Ross	3 m springboard	430.55	3	457.15	2nd place, silver medalist(s)
Eric Sehn	1 m springboard	330.50	10	348.95	10
Eric Sehn	3 m springboard	415.70	5	437.05	4
Eric Sehn	10 m platform	395.25	6	419.90	6
Alexandre Despatie; Reuben Ross	3 m synchronized springboard			430.35	1st place, gold medalist(s)

Women

Athlete	Events	Semifinal		Final	
Athlete	Events	Points	Rank	Points	Rank
Jennifer Abel	1 m springboard	274.70	2	301.75	1st place, gold medalist(s)
Jennifer Abel	3 m springboard	347.25	2	338.55	2nd place, silver medalist(s)
Roseline Filion	10 m platform	322.60	6	353.05	4
Emilie Heymans	1 m springboard	273.75	3	296.10	3rd place, bronze medalist(s)
Emilie Heymans	3 m springboard	313.20	4	252.60	9
Rachel Kemp	10 m platform				
Carol-Ann Ware	10 m platform	298.55	8	345.40	5
Pamela Ware	1 m springboard	249.65	8	243.65	9
Pamela Ware	3 m springboard	263.25	8	299.05	7
Jennifer Abel; Emilie Heymans	3 m synchronized springboard			318.90	1st place, gold medalist(s)
Carol-Ann Ware; Pamela Ware	3 m synchronized springboard			311.34	5
Rachel Kemp; Roseline Filion	10 m synchronized platform			298.05	8
Carol-Ann Ware; Pamela Ware	10 m synchronized platform			315.81	6

== Gymnastics ==
Canada will send 13 gymnasts to the 2010 Commonwealth Games.

=== Artistic ===
Men

- Tariq Dowers
- Ian Galvan
- Anderson Loran
- Robert Watson
- Jason Scott

Women

- Gabby May
- Catherine Dion
- Kristin Klarenbach
- Cynthia Lemieux-Guillemette
- Emma Willis

=== Rhythmic ===
- Mariam Chamilova
- Demetra Mantcheva
- Nerissa Mo

== Field hockey ==
Canada has qualified both a men's and women's field hockey team for the 2010 Commonwealth Games.

=== Men ===
The team.

- Adam Froese
- David Carter
- Matthew Guest
- Richard Hildreth
- David Jameson
- Antoni Kindler
- Mark Pearson
- Ken Pereira

- Rob Short
- Iain Smythe
- Hudson Stewart
- Sukhwinder Singh
- Scott Tupper
- Jesse Watson
- Philip Wright

Canada has been drawn into Group B with South Africa, England, Trinidad and Tobago and New Zealand.

Pool B

Team	Pts	Pld	W	D	L	GF	GA	GD
England	10	4	3	1	0	12	5	+7
New Zealand	7	4	2	1	1	15	9	+6
South Africa	6	4	2	0	2	12	10	+2
Canada	5	4	1	2	1	5	6	–1
Trinidad and Tobago	0	4	0	0	4	4	18	–14

Match Schedule:

5 October 2010
16:30

Canada	1-4	South Africa

Dhyan Chand National Stadium, New Delhi

7 October 2010
18:00

England	1-1	Canada

Dhyan Chand National Stadium, New Delhi

9 October 2010
16:00

Canada	2-0	Trinidad and Tobago

Dhyan Chand National Stadium, New Delhi

10 October 2010
14:00

New Zealand	1-1	Canada

Dhyan Chand National Stadium, New Delhi

=== Women ===
The team.

- Abigail Raye
- Ali Lee
- Amanda Stone
- Anna Kozniuk
- Azelia Liu
- Diana Roemer
- Kate Gillis
- Katie Baker

- Katie Collison
- Kristine Wishart
- Robyn Pendleton
- Samantha Smith
- Stephanie Jameson
- Stephanie Nesbitt
- Thea Culley
- Tyla Flexman

Canada has been drawn into Group B with England, Wales, Malaysia and New Zealand.

Pool B

Team	Pts	Pld	W	D	L	GF	GA	GD
New Zealand	12	4	4	0	0	17	3	+14
England	9	4	3	0	1	12	6	+6
Canada	3	4	1	0	3	6	11	–5
Wales	3	4	1	0	3	5	12	–7
Malaysia	3	4	1	0	3	4	12	–8

Match Schedule:

4 October 2010
16:00

Canada	2-3	Malaysia

Dhyan Chand National Stadium, New Delhi

6 October 2010
11:00

England	4-1	Canada

Dhyan Chand National Stadium, New Delhi

8 October 2010
18:30

Canada	2-1	Wales

Dhyan Chand National Stadium, New Delhi

9 October 2010
16:30

New Zealand	3-1	Canada

Dhyan Chand National Stadium, New Delhi

== Lawn bowls ==
Canada sent a team of 12 lawn bowlers to the 2010 Commonwealth Games

Men

Event	Player(s)	Rank
Singles	Ryan Bester	-
Pairs	Michel Larue; Keith Roney	9th
Triples	Hiren Bhartu; Steve McKerihen; Fred Wallbank	11th

Women

Event	Player(s)	Rank
Singles	Josephine Lee	-
Pairs	Amanda Berg; Shirley Fitzpatrick-Wong	12th
Triples	Erin Marie Roth; Rachel Larson; Harriette Pituley	13th

== Rugby sevens ==
Canada rugby sevens' team consisted of 12 athletes and was announced on September 9. Canada played Guyana, New Zealand and Scotland in the round robin but did not advance to the next round.

- Nanyak Dala
- Thyssen de Goede
- Sean Duke
- Ciaran Hearn
- Nathan Hirayama
- Phil Mack

- Ian Shoults
- Neil Meechan
- Justin Mensah-Coker
- John Moonlight
- Taylor Paris
- Conor Trainor

Group A

Team	Pld	W	D	L	PF	PA	PD	Pts
New Zealand	3	3	0	0	141	7	+134	9
Scotland	3	2	0	1	45	63	-18	7
Canada	3	1	0	2	71	62	9	5
Guyana	3	0	0	3	0	125	-125	3

11 October 2010
9:44

Canada	7-43	New Zealand

Delhi University, New Delhi

11 October 2010
13:12

Canada	17-19	Scotland

Delhi University, New Delhi

11 October 2010
15:54

Canada	47-0	Guyana

Delhi University, New Delhi

== Shooting ==
Canada's shooting team was a B team. Canada's shooting team was announced on August 25, 2010. The team consists of 16 shooters 4 less than in Melbourne.

Men

Athlete	Event	Qualification		Final	
Athlete	Event	Score	Rank	Score	Rank
Richard McBride	Skeet				
Jason Caswell	Skeet				
Drew Shaw	Trap				
Drew Shaw	Double trap	133	12		
Paul Shaw	Trap				
Paul Shaw	Double trap				
Wynn Payne	Prone Rifle				
James Paton	Fullbore Rifle				
Desmond Vamplew	Fullbore Rifle				
Sylvain Ouellette	10 m air pistol				
Sylvain Ouellette	50m Pistol	518-4x	18		
Metodi Igorov	Rapid Fire	280-6x	6	564-12x	5
Metodi Igorov	Center Fire Pistol				
Alan Markewicz	10 m air pistol				
Alan Markewicz	50m Pistol	505-4x	20		
Alan Markewicz	Rapid Fire	268-3x	10	527-3x	11
Alan Markewicz	Center Fire Pistol				

Women

Athlete	Event	Qualification		Final	
Athlete	Event	Score	Rank	Score	Rank
Susan Nattrass	Trap				
Cynthia Meyer	Trap				
Lea Wachowich	25 m Pistol	565-14x	8	757	8
Patricia Boulay	25 m Pistol	542-6x	126		
Dorothy Ludwig	10 m air pistol				
Lynda Hare	10 m air pistol				

== Squash ==
Canada's squash team consisted of 7 athletes (3 male and 4 female). On October 1, 2010, Shahier Razik withdrew due to an injury, a replacement was not announced.

Men

Athlete	Event	Round of 64	Round of 32	Round of 16	Quarterfinals	Semifinals	Final
Athlete	Event	Opposition Score	Opposition Score	Opposition Score	Opposition Score	Opposition Score	Opposition Score
Robin Clarke	Singles	O Bailey (SVG); 3-0	M A Iskandar (MAS); 1-3				
Shawn Delierre	Singles	H Birch (GUE)					
Andrew McDougall	Singles	O Ofoyuru (UGA); 3-0					

Doubles

Pool 4

Rank	Team	Pts	Pld	W	L	PF	PA
1	Cuskelly – Pilley (AUS)	0	0	0	0	0	0
2	Clarke – Delierre (CAN)	0	0	0	0	0	0
3	Bentick – Snagg (SVG)	0	0	0	0	0	0

Women

Athlete	Event	Preliminary round	Round of 32	Round of 16	Quarterfinals	Semifinals	Final
Athlete	Event	Opposition Score	Opposition Score	Opposition Score	Opposition Score	Opposition Score	Opposition Score
Samantha Cornett	Singles	Bye	A Waters (ENG); 0-3				
Stephanie Edmison	Singles	N Dodd (GUE); 3-0	S Misra (IND); 3-0	A Waters (ENG); 0-3			
Alana Miller	Singles	Bye	A Reddy (IND); 3-0	L Massaro (ENG); 0-3			
Miranda Ranieri	Singles	K Cadigan (JER); 3-0	K Brown (AUS); 0-3				

Doubles

Pool 1

Rank	Team	Pts	Pld	W	L	PF	PA
1	Brown – Urquhart (AUS)	0	0	0	0	0	0
2	Leevey – Lindsay (NZL)	0	0	0	0	0	0
3	Cornett – Ranieri (CAN)	0	0	0	0	0	0
4	Cadigan – Cowie (JER)	0	0	0	0	0	0

Mixed

Pool 1

Rank	Team	Pts	Pld	W	L	PF	PA
1	Brown – Pilley (AUS)	0	0	0	0	0	0
2	Wee – Yuen (MAS)	0	0	0	0	0	0
3	Cornett – Clarke (CAN)	0	0	0	0	0	0
4	Sample – Ramasra (TRI)	0	0	0	0	0	0

Pool 3

Rank	Team	Pts	Pld	W	L	PF	PA
1	David – Hee (MAS)	0	0	0	0	0	0
2	Leitch – Aitken (SCO)	0	0	0	0	0	0
3	Edminson – McDougall (CAN)	0	0	0	0	0	0
4	Nimji – Reel (KEN)	0	0	0	0	0	0

== Swimming ==
Canada's swimming team will consist of 27 swimmers. The Relay teams was announced the day prior to competition.

Men

Athlete	Event	Heats		Semifinals		Final	
Athlete	Event	Time	Rank	Time	Rank	Time	Rank
Brent Hayden	50 m freestyle	22.25	1	22.18	2	22.01	1st place, gold medalist(s)
Brent Hayden	100 m freestyle	49.79	2	48.74	2	47.98	1st place, gold medalist(s)
Richard Hortness	50 m freestyle	23.20	13	23.33	14	Did Not Advance	
Richard Hortness	100 m freestyle	50.85	14	50.91	14	Did Not Advance	
Benoit Huot	100 m freestyle S10					53.70	1st place, gold medalist(s)
Blake Worsley	50 m freestyle	24.17	21	Did Not Advance			
Blake Worsley	100 m freestyle	51.70	18	Did Not Advance			
Blake Worsley	200 m freestyle	1:50.50	13	Did Not Advance			
Blake Worsley	400 m freestyle	3:54.82	12	Did Not Advance			
Tobias Oriwol	200 m freestyle	1:51.91	17	Did Not Advance			
Tobias Oriwol	50 m backstroke	26.62	7	26:56	9	Did Not Advance	
Tobias Oriwol	100 m backstroke	57.15	11	55.76	10	Did Not Advance	
Tobias Oriwol	200 m backstroke	1:59.79	3			2:00.24	7
Tobias Oriwol	200 m medley	2:02.97	7			2:03.09	8
Stefan Hirniak	200 m freestyle	1:49.11	6			1:48.65	6
Stefan Hirniak	100 m butterfly	54.51	7	53.85	6	53.83	6
Stefan Hirniak	200 m butterfly	1:57.01	1			1:57.26	3rd place, bronze medalist(s)
Ryan Cochrane	400 m freestyle	3:50.70	1			3:48.48	1st place, gold medalist(s)
Ryan Cochrane	1500 m freestyle	15:33.60	3			15:01.49	1st place, gold medalist(s)
Sean Penhale	400 m freestyle	4:01.00	15	Did Not Advance			
Sean Penhale	1500 m freestyle	15:56.88	8			15:39.39	7
Charles Francis	50 m backstroke	26.04	6	26.20	8	25.87	7
Charles Francis	100 m backstroke	56.06	8	55.88	11	Did Not Advance	
Charles Francis	200 m backstroke	1:59.67	2			2:00.07	5
Scott Dickens	50 m breaststroke	28.96	8	28.35	8	28.07	5
Scott Dickens	100 m breaststroke	1:02.47	8			1:00.98	5
Scott Dickens	200 m breaststroke	2:15.42	9	Did Not Advance			
Andrew Ford	200 m medley	2:03.65	11	Did Not Advance			
Andrew Ford	400 m medley	4:23.87	9	Did Not Advance			
Brian Johns	200 m medley	2:03.91	13	Did Not Advance			
Brian Johns	400 m medley	4:23.64	8			4:19.77	6

Men's Relays

Event	Swimmer(s)	Heats		Semi Finals		Final	
Event	Swimmer(s)	Result	Rank	Result	Rank	Result	Rank
Men's 4 × 100 m freestyle	Brent Hayden; Stefan Hirniak; Richard Hortness; Brian Johns; Tobias Oriwol; Blake Worsley	3:22.01	4			3:17.99	4
Men's 4 × 200 m freestyle	Ryan Cochrane; Robert Hortness; Robert Ford; Brent Hayden; Stefan Hirniak; Blake Worsley	7:37.29	1			7:14.63	4
Men's 4 × 100 m medley	Scott Dickens; Robert Ford; Brent Hayden; Stefan Hirniak; Tobias Oriwol; Blake Worsley	3:49.89	6			3:37.61	4

Women

Athlete	Event	Heats		Semifinals		Final	
Athlete	Event	Time	Rank	Time	Rank	Time	Rank
Victoria Poon	50 m freestyle	25.60	5	25.26	4	25.13	4
Victoria Poon	100 m freestyle	55.61	6	54.80	2	55:04	6
Katarina Roxon	50 m freestyle S9	31.57	5			34.37	6
Katarina Roxon	100 m freestyle S9	1:09.94	5			1:09.03	5
Genevieve Saumur	100 m freestyle	56.00	8	55.86	9	Did Not Advance	
Genevieve Saumur	200 m freestyle	1:59.97	7			1:58.50	4
Erica Morningstar	100 m freestyle	56.51	10	56.44	13	Did Not Advance	
Erica Morningstar	100 m breaststroke	Did Not Start					
Erica Morningstar	200 m medley	2:16.80	8			2:15.41	7
Barbara Jardin	200 m freestyle	2:00.32	8			2:00.76	8
Barbara Jardin	400 m freestyle	4:18.80	11	Did Not Advance			
Alexa Komarnycky	400 m freestyle	4:10.48	2			4:11.57	8
Alexa Komarnycky	800 m freestyle	8:36.71	9			Did Not Advance	
Alexa Komarnycky	400 m medley	4:48.94	7			4:47.69	7
Lauren Lavigna	50 m backstroke	30.17	11	Did Not Start			
Lauren Lavigna	100 m backstroke	1:02.58	12	Did Not Advance			
Lauren Lavigna	200 m backstroke	2:13.71	10	Did Not Advance			
Sinead Russell	50 m backstroke	29.21	8	29.09	8	29.14	8
Sinead Russell	100 m backstroke	1:04.49	4	1:01.07	7	1:01.42	8
Sinead Russell	200 m backstroke	2:13.23	9	Did Not Advance			
Sinead Russell	200 m medley	2:18.09	10	Did Not Advance			
Julia Wilkinson	50 m backstroke	29.04	4	28.65	5	28.76	6
Julia Wilkinson	100 m backstroke	1:01.71	10	1:00.82	4	1:00.74	3rd place, bronze medalist(s)
Julia Wilkinson	200 m medley	2:14.52	4			2:12.09	3rd place, bronze medalist(s)
Genevieve Cantin	200 m backstroke	2:12.87	7			2:12.04	8
Genevieve Cantin	400 m medley	5:00.77	10	Did Not Advance			
Martha McCabe	50 m breaststroke	32.96	14	32.68	11	Did Not Advance	
Martha McCabe	100 m breaststroke	1:09.91	5	1:09.47	6	1:09.25	6
Martha McCabe	200 m breaststroke	2:28.85	5			2:26.46	4
Annamay Pierse	50 m breaststroke	31.71	5	32.07	6	32.15	6
Annamay Pierse	100 m breaststroke	1:10.00	6	1:08.97	5	1:08.79	5
Annamay Pierse	200 m breaststroke	2:27.41	1			2:27.21	5
Mackenzie Downing	50 m butterfly	27.54	10	27.12	7	27.42	8
Mackenzie Downing	100 m butterfly	1:00.14	7	59.57	9	Did Not Advance	
Mackenzie Downing	200 m butterfly	2:10.04	4			2:11.05	6
Audrey Lacroix	50 m butterfly	27.49	9	27.68	12	Did Not Advance	
Audrey Lacroix	100 m butterfly	58.96	2			59.22	6
Audrey Lacroix	200 m butterfly	2:09.63	2			2:07.31	2nd place, silver medalist(s)
Katerine Savard	50 m butterfly	27.10	6	26.96	5	27.21	7
Katerine Savard	100 m butterfly	59.41	4			59.91	8
Katerine Savard	200 m butterfly	2:18.33	11			Did Not Advance	

== Synchronized swimming ==
Canada attempted to continue its streak of winning every gold medal awarded in the sport ever at the Commonwealth Games. The team was announced on August 19, 2010.

- Élise Marcotte – Duet (substitute)

Athlete	Event	Technical Routine		Free Routine (Preliminary)				Free Routine (Final)			
Athlete	Event	Points	Rank	Points	Rank	Total points	Rank	Points	Rank	Total points	Rank
Marie-Pier Boudreau Gagnon	Solo	95.334	1								
Marie-Pier Boudreau Gagnon; Chloé Isaac	Duet	95.000	1								

== Table tennis ==
Canada's table tennis squad consisted of 10 athletes, two of them being alternates but did not actually participate.

Men

- Pradeeban Peter-Paul
- Pierre-Luc Hinse
- Xavier Therien
- Andre Ho
- Pierre-Luc Thériault *Alternate

Athlete	Event	Round of 64	Round of 32	Round of 16	Quarterfinals	Semifinals	Final
Athlete	Event	Opposition Score	Opposition Score	Opposition Score	Opposition Score	Opposition Score	Opposition Score
Pradeeban Peter-Paul	Singles	bye	M Yiangou (CYP); 3-4	-	-	-	-
Xavier Therien	Singles	L Abrahams (RSA); 4-1	W Henzell (AUS); 1-4	-	-	-	-
Pierre-Luc Hinse	Singles	O Jegede (NGR); 2-4	-	-	-	-	-
Andre Ho	Singles	S Gerada (AUS); 2-4	-	-	-	-	-

Women

- Zhang Mo
- Sara Yuen
- Carmen Lee
- Anqi Luo
- Marie-Andree Levesque *Alternate

Athlete	Event	Round of 64	Round of 32	Round of 16	Quarterfinals	Semifinals	Final
Athlete	Event	Opposition Score	Opposition Score	Opposition Score	Opposition Score	Opposition Score	Opposition Score
Zhang Mo	Singles	bye	S Kumaresan (IND); 4-2	Y Wang (SIN); 1-4	-	-	-
Sara Yuen	Singles	bye	M Das (IND); 1-4	-	-	-	-
Carmen Lee	Singles	DNQ	-	-	-	-	-
Anqi Luo	Singles	DNQ	-	-	-	-	-

== Weightlifting ==
Canada sent a team of 15 weightlifters to the 2010 Commonwealth Games

Men

Athlete	Event	Snatch		Clean & Jerk		Total	Rank
Athlete	Event	Result	Rank	Result	Rank	Total	Rank
Jasvir Singh	-62 kg	110	14	-	-	-	DNF
Dominic Lussier	-69 kg	126	5	151	7	277	7
Paul Dumais	-85 kg	145	3	170	6	315	5
Mathieu Marineau	-85 kg	145	3	180	3	325	3rd place, bronze medalist(s)
Buck Ramsay	-94 kg	135	7	179	5	314	7
Nicholas Roberts	-94 kg	140	4	176	6	316	5
George Kobaladze	-+105 kg	168	3	218	1	386	3rd place, bronze medalist(s)
Parm Phangura	-+105 kg	-	-	-	-	-	DNF

Women

Athlete	Event	Snatch		Clean & Jerk		Total	Rank
Athlete	Event	Result	Rank	Result	Rank	Total	Rank
Marilou Dozois-Prévost	-53 kg	82	1	100	1	182	1st place, gold medalist(s)
Emily Quarton	-58 kg	80	6	105	3	185	5
Annie Moniqui	-58 kg	82	5	102	6	184	6
Marie-Josée Arès-Pilon	-69 kg	92	4	115	4	207	4
Christine Girard	-69 kg	105	1	130	1	235	1st place, gold medalist(s)
Katelynn Williams	-75 kg	88	9	111	9	199	9
Marie-Ève Beauchemin-Nadeau	-75 kg	99	2	126	2	225	2nd place, silver medalist(s)

== Wrestling ==
Canada sent a team of 16 wrestlers to the 2010 Commonwealth Games.

On October 1, 2010, both John Pineda and Khetag Pliev withdrew due to injuries and were replaced with Promise Mwenga (who is already competing in Greco-Roman) and Korey Jarvis respectively.

Men's Freestyle

Athlete	Event	Round of 16	Quarterfinals	Semifinals	Repechage Round 1	Repechage Round 2	Finals	Rank
Athlete	Event	Opposition Result	Opposition Result	Opposition Result	Opposition Result	Opposition Result	Opposition Result	Rank
Promise Mwenga	-55 kg	DNQ	-	-	-	-	-	
James Mancini	-60 kg		D Amas (NGR); 2-1	V Etko (SCO); 2-0			Y Dutt (IND); 0-2	2nd place, silver medalist(s)
Chris Prickett	-66 kg	A Rogers (SLE); 1-0	H Barnes (RSA); 0-2	-	G Emilie (MRI); 2-0	P Roberts (MRI); 2-0	M Salmen (PAK); 2-1	3rd place, bronze medalist(s)
Evan MacDonald	−74 kg		K Ermakovich (AUS); 2-0	N Yadav (IND); 0-2	M Grundy (AUS); 2-0		A Muhammad (AUS); 2-1	3rd place, bronze medalist(s)
Danny Brown	-84 kg	A Dick (NGR); 1-2	-	-	-	-	-	
Korey Jarvis	-96 kg	bye	M Umar (PAK); 2-0	B Abdo (AUS); 1-0			S Boltic (NGR); 1-2	2nd place, silver medalist(s)
Arjan Bhullar	-120 kg		T Onanena (CMR)	N Lane (NZL); 2-0			J Kumar (IND); 2-0	1st place, gold medalist(s)

Women's Freestyle

Athlete	Event	Quarterfinals	Semifinals	Repechage Round 1	Repechage Round 2	Finals	Rank	
Athlete	Event	Opposition Result	Opposition Result	Opposition Result	Opposition Result	Opposition Result	Rank	
Carol Huynh	−48 kg	O Adekuroye (NGR); 2-0	F Robertson (SCO); 2-0			N Devi (IND); 2-0	1st place, gold medalist(s)	
Jessica MacDonald	−51 kg	B Kumari (IND); 1-2	-	J Madyarchyk (ENG); 2-0		M Madi (RSA); 1-0	3rd place, bronze medalist(s)	
Jillian Gallays	−55 kg	L Edward (NGR); 1-2	-	-	-	-		
Tonya Verbeek	−59 kg	K Marsh (SCO); 2-0	T Richard (NGR); 1-0			A Tomar (IND); 0-1	2nd place, silver medalist(s)	
Justine Bouchard	−63 kg	Z Geringer (RSA); 1-0	L Ndungu (KEN); 1-0			B Oborududu (NGR); 2-1	1st place, gold medalist(s)	
Ohenewa Akuffo	−72 kg	-	C Field (AUS); 2-1	H Okus (NGR); 2-0			A Ali (CMR); 2-1	1st place, gold medalist(s)

Men's Greco-Roman

Athlete	Event	Round of 16	Quarterfinals	Semifinals	Repechage Round 1	Repechage Round 2	Finals	Rank
Athlete	Event	Opposition Result	Opposition Result	Opposition Result	Opposition Result	Opposition Result	Opposition Result	Rank
Promise Mwenga	−55 kg	-	C van Wyk (RSA); 2-1	R Kumar (IND); 0-2	K Yaparathna (SRI); 2-0	S Sanni (NGR); 2-1	-	3rd place, bronze medalist(s)
Jack Bond	−66 kg	-	R Liyanage (SRI); 2-0	B Hawthorn (WAL); 2-0			M Dykun (RSA); 0-1	2nd place, silver medalist(s)
Eric Feunekes	−96 kg	M Umar (PAK); 2-1	H Fkiri (AUS); 0-2	-	S Belkin (NZL); 1-0	K Bella-Lufu (RSA) pin?	-	3rd place, bronze medalist(s)

== See also ==
- 2010 Commonwealth Games
