= Swimming at the 2010 Commonwealth Games – Women's 100 metre breaststroke =

Women's 100 metre Breaststroke at the 2010 Commonwealth Games
- Venue: SPM Swimming Pool Complex
- Dates: 7 October (heats, semifinals); 8 October (final)
- Competitors: 26 from 15 nations
- Winning time: 1:05.84

Medalists
| gold medal | Leisel Jones | Australia |
| silver medal | Samantha Marshall | Australia |
| bronze medal | Kate Haywood | England |

The Women's 100 metre breaststroke event at the 2010 Commonwealth Games took place on October 7 and 8 2010, at the SPM Swimming Pool Complex.

Four heats were held, with most containing the maximum number of swimmers (eight). The top sixteen advanced to the semifinals and the top eight from there qualified for the finals.

== Heats summary ==
| Rank | Heat | Lane | Name | Nationality | Time | Notes |
|---|---|---|---|---|---|---|
| 1 | 2 | 5 | Kate Haywood | England | 1:08.37 | Q |
| 2 | 2 | 4 | Samantha Marshall | Australia | 1:08.41 | Q |
| 3 | 3 | 4 | Sarah Katsoulis | Australia | 1:08.43 | Q |
| 4 | 4 | 4 | Leisel Jones | Australia | 1:09.22 | Q |
| 5 | 4 | 3 | Martha McCabe | Canada | 1:09.91 | Q |
| 6 | 4 | 5 | Annamay Pierse | Canada | 1:10.00 | Q |
| 7 | 2 | 3 | Stacey Tadd | England | 1:10.69 | Q |
| 8 | 3 | 3 | Kerry Buchan | Scotland | 1:11.09 | Q |
| 9 | 3 | 2 | Kathryn Johnstone | Scotland | 1:11.14 | Q |
| 10 | 3 | 6 | Alia Atkinson | Jamaica | 1:11.47 | Q |
| 11 | 4 | 2 | Lowri Tynan | Wales | 1:11.53 | Q |
| 12 | 4 | 6 | Sara Lougher | Wales | 1:11.62 | Q |
| 13 | 3 | 5 | Rebecca Ajulu-Bushell | England | 1:12.12 | Q |
| 14 | 2 | 2 | Sycerika McMahon | Northern Ireland | 1:12.22 | Q |
| 14 | 4 | 7 | Georgia Holderness | Wales | 1:12.22 | Q |
| 16 | 2 | 7 | Yen Loh | Malaysia | 1:13.14 | Q |
| 17 | 3 | 7 | Corrie Scott | Scotland | 1:13.60 | |
| 18 | 2 | 1 | Chia Chia Kong | Malaysia | 1:13.66 | |
| 19 | 3 | 1 | Danielle Beaubrun | Saint Lucia | 1:13.97 | |
| 20 | 4 | 8 | Anastasia Christoforou | Cyprus | 1:14.39 | |
| 21 | 3 | 8 | Jessica Stephenson | Guyana | 1:17.83 | |
| 22 | 1 | 4 | Poorva Shetye | India | 1:20.79 | |
| 23 | 1 | 5 | Jamila Lunkuse | Uganda | 1:29.24 | |
| 24 | 1 | 3 | Kanyali Ilako | Kenya | 1:32.74 | |
| | 2 | 6 | Erica Morningstar | Canada | DNS | |
| | 4 | 1 | Natalie Wiegersma | New Zealand | DNS | |

== Semifinals ==
=== Semifinal 1 ===
| Rank | Lane | Name | Nationality | Time | Notes |
|---|---|---|---|---|---|
| 1 | 5 | Leisel Jones | Australia | 1:07.73 | Q |
| 2 | 4 | Samantha Marshall | Australia | 1:07.95 | Q |
| 3 | 3 | Annamay Pierse | Canada | 1:08.97 | Q |
| 4 | 7 | Sara Lougher | Wales | 1:10.85 | |
| 5 | 2 | Alia Atkinson | Jamaica | 1:11.28 | |
| 6 | 6 | Kerry Buchan | Scotland | 1:11.33 | |
| 7 | 1 | Sycerika McMahon | Northern Ireland | 1:11.58 | |
| 8 | 8 | Yen Loh | Malaysia | 1:13.07 | |

=== Semifinal 2 ===
| Rank | Lane | Name | Nationality | Time | Notes |
|---|---|---|---|---|---|
| 1 | 5 | Sarah Katsoulis | Australia | 1:08.47 | Q |
| 2 | 4 | Kate Haywood | England | 1:08.51 | Q |
| 3 | 3 | Martha McCabe | Canada | 1:09.47 | Q |
| 4 | 6 | Stacey Tadd | England | 1:10.16 | Q |
| 5 | 1 | Rebecca Ajulu-Bushell | England | 1:10.67 | Q |
| 6 | 2 | Kathryn Johnstone | Scotland | 1:11.00 | |
| 7 | 7 | Lowri Tynan | Wales | 1:11.30 | |
| 8 | 8 | Georgia Holderness | Wales | 1:11.94 | |

== Final ==
| Rank | Lane | Name | Nationality | Time | Notes |
|---|---|---|---|---|---|
| 1st place, gold medalist(s) | 4 | Leisel Jones | Australia | 1:05.84 | |
| 2nd place, silver medalist(s) | 5 | Samantha Marshall | Australia | 1:07.97 | |
| 3rd place, bronze medalist(s) | 6 | Kate Haywood | England | 1:08.29 | |
| 4 | 3 | Sarah Katsoulis | Australia | 1:08.49 | |
| 5 | 2 | Annamay Pierse | Canada | 1:08.79 | |
| 6 | 7 | Martha McCabe | Canada | 1:09.25 | |
| 7 | 1 | Stacey Tadd | England | 1:10.12 | |
| 8 | 8 | Rebecca Ajulu-Bushell | England | 1:10.73 | |
