= Swimming at the 2010 Commonwealth Games – Women's 50 metre breaststroke =

The Women's 50 metre backstroke event at the 2010 Commonwealth Games took place on 4 and 5 October 2010, at the SPM Swimming Pool Complex.

Four heats were held, with most containing the maximum number of swimmers (eight). The top sixteen advanced to the semifinals and the top eight from there qualified for the finals.

== Heats ==
Rank	Name	Nationality	Time	Heat	Lane	Notes
1	Leiston Pickett	Australia	30.57	3	4	
2	Leisel Jones	Australia	31.04	4	4	
3	Kate Haywood	England	31.30	3	5	
4	Sarah Katsoulis	Australia	31.50	4	5	
5	Annamay Pierse	Canada	31.71	3	3	
6	Rebecca Ajulu-Bushell	England	31.97	2	4	
7	Kathryn Johnstone	Scotland	32.14	2	3	
8	Alia Atkinson	Jamaica	32.24	2	5	
9	Sycerika McMahon	Northern Ireland	32.30	4	2	
10	Corrie Scott	Scotland	32.64	2	6	
11	Lowri Tynan	Wales	32.68	4	3	
12	Sara Lougher	Wales	32.83	4	6	
13	Georgia Holderness	Wales	32.92	3	6	
14	Anastasia Christoforou	Cyprus	32.96	3	2	
15	Martha McCabe	Canada	32.96	3	7	
16	Kerry Buchan	Scotland	33.19	2	2	

== Semifinals ==
=== Semifinal 1 ===
Rank	Lane	Name	Nationality	Time	Notes
1	4	Leisel Jones	Australia	31.29	Q
2	3	Rebecca Ajulu-Bushell	England	31.47	Q
3	5	Sarah Katsoulis	Australia	31.58	Q
4	6	Alia Atkinson	Jamaica	32.13	Q
5	2	Corrie Scott	Scotland	32.80	
6	8	Kerry Buchan	Scotland	32.93	
7	7	Sara Lougher	Wales	32.99	
8	1	Anastasia Christoforou	Cyprus	33.08	

=== Semifinal 2 ===
Rank	Lane	Name	Nationality	Time	Notes
1	4	Leiston Pickett	Australia	30.74	Q
2	5	Kate Haywood	England	31.22	Q
3	3	Annamay Pierse	Canada	32.07	Q
4	6	Kathryn Johnstone	Scotland	32.31	Q
5	7	Lowri Tynan	Wales	32.34	
6	2	Sycerika McMahon	Northern Ireland	32.42	
7	8	Martha McCabe	Canada	32.68	
8	1	Georgia Holderness	Wales	32.83	

== Final ==
Rank	Name	Nationality	Lane	Time	Notes
1st place, gold medalist(s)	Leiston Pickett	Australia	4	30.84	
2nd place, silver medalist(s)	Leisel Jones	Australia	3	31.10	
3rd place, bronze medalist(s)	Kate Haywood	England	5	31.17	
4	Sarah Katsoulis	Australia	2	31.43	
5	Rebecca Ajulu-Bushell	England	6	31.56	
6	Annamay Pierse	Canada	7	32.15	
7	Kathryn Johnstone	Scotland	8	32.19	
8	Alia Atkinson	Jamaica	1	32.48	
