= Diving at the 2010 Commonwealth Games – Men's 1 metre springboard =

The men's 1 metre springboard diving event is one of 260 events in 17 disciplines at the 2010 Commonwealth Games. It was held on 10 October 2010.

== Results ==
Green denotes finalists

Rank	Diver	Preliminary		Final	
Rank	Diver	Points	Rank	Points	Rank
Gold medal	Alexandre Despatie (CAN)	416.10	1	468.15	1
Silver medal	Matthew Mitcham (AUS)	404.10	2	441.00	2
Bronze medal	Scott Robertson (AUS)	358.70	8	409.15	3
4	Ken Yeoh (MAS)	361.05	7	400.10	4
5	Reuben Ross (CAN)	366.30	5	385.70	5
6	Nick Robinson-Baker (ENG)	356.20	9	385.10	6
7	Bryan Lomas (MAS)	361.70	6	370.80	7
8	Grant Nel (AUS)	372.00	4	366.70	8
9	Oliver Dingley (ENG)	380.60	3	352.35	9
10	Eric Sehn (CAN)	330.50	10	348.95	10
11	Muhammad Zain (MAS)	292.10	11	334.20	11
12	Hari Thimmarayappa (IND)	274.75	12	251.25	12
13	Rabikumar Senjam (IND)	251.70	13		
