= Swimming at the 2010 Commonwealth Games – Women's 200 metre individual medley =

The Women's 200 individual medley event at the 2010 Commonwealth Games took place on 4 October 2010, at the SPM Swimming Pool Complex.

Two heats were held, with both containing the seven swimmers. The heat in which a swimmer competed did not formally matter for advancement, as the swimmers with the top eight times from the entire field qualified for the finals.

== Heats ==
=== Heat 1 ===
Rank	Lane	Name	Nationality	Time	Notes
1	5	Alicia Coutts	Australia	02:13.86	Q
2	4	Hannah Miley	Scotland	02:14.08	Q
3	3	Natalie Wiegersma	New Zealand	02:15.45	Q
4	6	Aimee Willmott	England	02:15.95	Q
5	2	Sinead Russell	Canada	02:18.09	
6	7	Bethany Carson	Northern Ireland	02:21.89	
7	1	Pooja Alva	India	02:32.11	

=== Heat 2 ===
Rank	Lane	Name	Nationality	Time	Notes
1	4	Emily Seebohm	Australia	02:14.32	Q
2	5	Julia Wilkinson	Canada	02:14.52	Q
3	2	Kate Hutchinson	England	02:15.90	Q
4	3	Erica Morningstar	Canada	02:16.80	Q
5	6	Anne Bochmann	England	02:18.07	
6	7	Alia Atkinson	Jamaica	02:24.39	
7	1	Sian Morgan	Wales	02:24.93	

== Final ==
Rank	Lane	Name	Nationality	Time	Notes
1st place, gold medalist(s)	4	Alicia Coutts	Australia	02:09.70	
2nd place, silver medalist(s)	3	Emily Seebohm	Australia	02:10.83	
3rd place, bronze medalist(s)	6	Julia Wilkinson	Canada	02:12.09	
4	2	Natalie Wiegersma	New Zealand	02:12.12	
5	5	Hannah Miley	Scotland	02:12.90	
6	1	Aimee Willmott	England	02:15.38	
7	8	Erica Morningstar	Canada	02:15.41	
8	7	Kate Hutchinson	England	02:15.75	
