= Diving at the 2010 Commonwealth Games – Men's 3 metre springboard =

The men's 3 metre springboard diving event was held on 11 October 2010.

== Results ==
Green denotes finalists

Rank	Diver	Preliminary		Final	
Rank	Diver	Points	Rank	Points	Rank
Gold medal	Alexandre Despatie (CAN)	485.15	1	513.75	1
Silver medal	Reuben Ross (CAN)	430.55	3	457.15	2
Bronze medal	Grant Nel (AUS)	407.65	6	456.55	3
4	Eric Sehn (CAN)	415.70	5	437.05	4
5	Nick Robinson-Baker (ENG)	393.70	9	435.50	5
6	Ken Yeoh (MAS)	399.80	8	422.30	6
7	Bryan Lomas (MAS)	325.80	11	419.30	7
8	Scott Robertson (AUS)	426.35	4	417.45	8
9	Ethan Warren (AUS)	472.55	2	407.90	9
10	Muhammad Zain (MAS)	353.25	10	381.50	10
11	Jack Laugher (ENG)	400.30	7	370.20	11
12	Hari Thimmarayappa (IND)	260.70	12	261.20	12
13	Manesh Mohan (IND)	255.70	13		
