= Swimming at the 2010 Commonwealth Games – Men's 200 metre freestyle =

Event at the 2010 Commonwealth Games

The Men's 200 metre freestyle event at the 2010 Commonwealth Games took place on 5 October 2010, at the SPM Swimming Pool Complex.

Five heats were held, with most containing the maximum number of swimmers (eight). The heat in which a swimmer competed did not formally matter for advancement, as the swimmers with the top eight times from the entire field qualified for the finals.

== Heats ==
=== Heat 1 ===
Rank	Lane	Name	Nationality	Time	Notes
1	5	Adam Viktora	Seychelles	02:06.26	
2	6	Christopher Mangroo	Seychelles	02:10.91	
	3	Eliasu Abrama	Ghana		DNS
	4	Bernard Blewudzi	Ghana		DNS

=== Heat 2 ===
Rank	Lane	Name	Nationality	Time	Notes
1	5	Zhen Teo	Singapore	01:56.23	
2	4	Jeremy Matthews	Singapore	01:56.24	
3	1	Matthew Abeysinghe	Sri Lanka	01:56.53	
4	6	Arren Quek	Singapore	01:57.90	
5	3	Leam Lee	Malaysia	01:58.99	
6	7	Colin Bensadon	Gibraltar	02:00.32	NR
7	8	James Sanderson	Gibraltar	02:02.18	
8	2	Walter Simpson	Grenada	02:09.10	

=== Heat 3 ===
Rank	Lane	Name	Nationality	Time	Notes
1	4	Jean Basson	South Africa	01:48.21	Q
2	7	Stefan Hirniak	Canada	01:49.11	Q
3	5	Robert Bale	England	01:49.26	Q
4	6	Darian Townsend	South Africa	01:49.90	
5	2	Sebastien Rousseau	South Africa	01:51.08	
6	3	David Harrison	Northern Ireland	01:54.00	
7	8	Rohit Havaldar	India	01:58.15	
	1	Kevin Yeak	Malaysia		DNS

=== Heat 4 ===
Rank	Lane	Name	Nationality	Time	Notes
1	4	Thomas Fraser-Holmes	Australia	01:48.63	Q
2	3	David Carry	Scotland	01:48.84	Q
3	5	David Ffrost	Australia	01:49.65	
4	6	Thomas Worsley	Canada	01:50.50	
5	7	Ieuan Lloyd	Wales	01:50.83	
6	1	Tobias Oriwol	Canada	01:51.91	
7	8	Wesley Jordan	Zambia	01:57.26	
	2	Thomas Parris	England		DNS

=== Heat 5 ===
Rank	Lane	Name	Nationality	Time	Notes
1	5	Robert Renwick	Scotland	01:48.73	Q
2	4	Kenrick Monk	Australia	01:48.84	Q
3	3	Ross Davenport	England	01:49.38	Q
4	2	Shaune Fraser	Cayman Islands	01:49.40	
5	6	Andrew Hunter	Scotland	01:49.52	
6	7	Brett Fraser	Cayman Islands	01:50.82	
7	8	Aaron Dsouza	India	01:54.10	
8	1	Conor Leaney	Northern Ireland	01:57.83	

== Final ==
Rank	Name	Nationality	Lane	Time	Notes
1st place, gold medalist(s)	Robert Renwick	Scotland	3	01:47.88	
2nd place, silver medalist(s)	Kenrick Monk	Australia	2	01:47.90	
3rd place, bronze medalist(s)	Thomas Fraser-Holmes	Australia	5	01:48.22	
4	Jean Basson	South Africa	4	01:48.47	
5	Ross Davenport	England	8	01:48.60	
6	Stefan Hirniak	Canada	7	01:48.65	
7	Robert Bale	England	1	01:48.73	
8	David Carry	Scotland	6	01:49.19	
