= Swimming at the 2010 Commonwealth Games – Women's 400 metre freestyle =

The Women's 400 metre freestyle event at the 2010 Commonwealth Games took place on 8 October 2010, at the SPM Swimming Pool Complex.

Three heats were held, with most containing the maximum number of swimmers (eight). The heat in which a swimmer competed did not formally matter for advancement, as the swimmers with the top eight times from the entire field qualified for the finals.

== Heats ==
=== Heat 1 ===
Rank	Lane	Name	Nationality	Time	Notes
1	5	Joanne Jackson	England	4:12.32	Q
2	6	Anne Bochmann	England	4:13.74	Q
3	4	Katie Goldman	Australia	4:14.09	
4	2	Sycerika McMahon	Northern Ireland	4:20.19	
5	7	Sian Morgan	Wales	4:22.34	
6	1	Shannon Austin	Seychelles	4:36.43	
–	3	Caitlin McClatchey	Scotland		DNS

=== Heat 2 ===
Rank	Lane	Name	Nationality	Time	Notes
1	3	Lauren Boyle	New Zealand	4:10.31	Q
2	5	Wendy Trott	South Africa	4:13.15	Q
3	4	Bronte Barratt	Australia	4:17.06	
4	6	Cai Khoo	Malaysia	4:22.86	
5	1	Surabhi Tipre	India	4:31.67	
6	8	Tori Flowers	Cayman Islands	4:50.83	
–	2	Megan Gilchrist	Scotland		DNS
–	7	Clare Dawson	Northern Ireland		DNS

=== Heat 3 ===
Rank	Lane	Name	Nationality	Time	Notes
1	6	Alexandra Komarnycky	Canada	4:10.48	Q
2	4	Rebecca Adlington	England	4:10.70	Q
3	5	Kylie Palmer	Australia	4:11.48	Q
4	3	Jazmin Carlin	Wales	4:12.11	Q
5	2	Barbara Rojas-Jardin	Canada	4:18.80	
6	7	Danielle Stirrat	Wales	4:25.57	
7	1	Richa Mishra	India	4:30.70	
8	8	Victoria Ho	Jamaica	4:37.11	

== Final ==
Rank	Lane	Name	Nationality	Time	Notes
1st place, gold medalist(s)	3	Rebecca Adlington	England	4:05.68	CG
2nd place, silver medalist(s)	6	Kylie Palmer	Australia	4:07.85	
3rd place, bronze medalist(s)	2	Jazmin Carlin	Wales	4:08.22	
4	8	Anne Bochmann	England	4:08.30	
5	4	Lauren Boyle	New Zealand	4:09.45	
6	7	Joanne Jackson	England	4:10.37	
7	1	Wendy Trott	South Africa	4:10.74	
8	5	Alexandra Komarnycky	Canada	4:11.57	
