= Athletics at the 2010 Commonwealth Games – Women's long jump =

Women's long jump at the Commonwealth Games

The Women's long jump at the 2010 Commonwealth Games as part of the athletics programme was held at the Jawaharlal Nehru Stadium on Saturday 9 October and Sunday 10 October 2010.

== Records ==
World Record	7.52	Galina Chistyakova	URS	Leningrad, Soviet Union	11 June 1988
Games Record	6.97	Bronwyn Thompson	AUS	Melbourne, Australia	2006

== Results ==
=== Qualifying round ===
Qualification: Qualifying Performance 6.50 (Q) or 12 best performers (q) to the advance to the Final.

Rank	Athlete	Group	1	2	3	Result	Notes
1	Rhonda Watkins (TRI)	A	6.56			6.56	Q
2	Ruky Abdulai (CAN)	A	x	6.46	x	6.46	q
3	Comfort Onyali (NGR)	B	6.45	6.23		6.45	q
4	Ola Sesay (SLE)	A	x	x	6.37	6.37	q
5	Alice Falaiye (CAN)	B	6.32	x	–	6.32	q
6	Prajusha Maliakkal (IND)	A	6.19	6.31	x	6.31	q
7	Tabia Charles (CAN)	B	5.88	x	6.29	6.29	q
8	Mayookha Johny (IND)	B	x	6.06	6.27	6.27	q
9	Tanika Liburd (SKN)	B	x	5.77	6.14	6.14	q
10	Reshmi Bose (IND)	A	6.12	6.06	6.12	6.12	q
11	Priyadarshani Nawanage (SRI)	A	x	6.02	6.11	6.11	q
12	Ayanna Alexander (TRI)	B	6.02	5.88	x	6.02	q
13	Rebecca Camilleri (MLT)	A	5.95	x	4.82	5.95	
14	Nickevea Wilson (JAM)	B	x	x	5.92	5.92	
15	Patricia Sylvester (GRN)	B	x	x	5.91	5.91	
16	Beatrice Gyaman (GHA)	A	5.56	5.65	5.46	5.65	
17	Nickeisha Beaumont (JAM)	A	x	x	5.62	5.62	
18	Kaina Martinez (BIZ)	B	3.99	5.05	4.93	5.05	
–	Blessing Okagbare (NGR)	A	–	–	–		DNS

=== Final ===
Rank	Athlete	1	2	3	4	5	6	Result	Notes
1st place, gold medalist(s)	Alice Falaiye (CAN)	6.11	6.28	6.37	x	6.44	6.50	6.50	
2nd place, silver medalist(s)	Prajusha Maliakkal (IND)	6.29	6.31	6.43	6.47	x	6.26	6.47	
3rd place, bronze medalist(s)	Tabia Charles (CAN)	5.94	6.31	x	6.39	6.44	6.24	6.44	SB
4	Rhonda Watkins (TRI)	x	x	6.36	6.32	x	6.35	6.36	
5	Ola Sesay (SLE)	5.90	x	6.30	6.30	6.20	x	6.30	
6	Mayookha Johny (IND)	x	6.08	6.30	6.29	6.29	6.27	6.30	
7	Reshmi Bose (IND)	6.16	6.26	x	6.12	x	6.01	6.26	
8	Priyadarshani Nawanage (SRI)	6.12	x	6.19	6.07	6.05	5.91	6.19	
9	Tanika Liburd (SKN)	6.03	x	6.17				6.17	
10	Ruky Abdulai (CAN)	6.13	x	x				6.13	
11	Ayanna Alexander (TRI)	5.58	5.87	x				5.87	
–	Comfort Onyali (NGR)	x	x	x				NM	
