= Gymnastics at the 2010 Commonwealth Games – Women's balance beam =

The Women's balance beam event took place on 8 October 2010 at the Indira Gandhi Arena.

== Final ==
Position	Gymnast	D Score	E Score	Penalty	Total
1st place, gold medalist(s)	Lauren Mitchell (AUS)	6.300	8.175		14.475
2nd place, silver medalist(s)	Lim Heem Wei (SIN)	4.800	8.025		12.825
3rd place, bronze medalist(s)	Cynthia Lemieux-Guillemette (CAN)	5.400	7.425		12.825
4	Laura Edwards (ENG)	5.000	7.750		12.750
5	Catherine Dion (CAN)	4.800	7.925		12.725
6	Jennifer Khwela (RSA)	5.500	7.000		12.500
7	Victoria Simpson (SCO)	4.700	7.650		12.350
8	Imogen Cairns (ENG)	4.800	7.150		11.950
