= Athletics at the 2010 Commonwealth Games – Women's triple jump =

Women's triple jump at the Commonwealth Games

The Women's triple jump at the 2010 Commonwealth Games as part of the athletics programme was held at the Jawaharlal Nehru Stadium on Friday 8 October 2010.

== Records ==
World Record	15.50	Inessa Kravets	UKR	Gothenburg, Sweden	10 August 1995
Games Record	14.86 m	Ashia Hansen	ENG	Manchester, England	31 July 2002

== Results ==
Rank	Athlete	1	2	3	4	5	6	Result	Notes
1st place, gold medalist(s)	Trecia Smith (JAM)	x	14.19	x	x	-	x	14.19	SB
2nd place, silver medalist(s)	Ayanna Alexander (TRI)	13.68	13.91	13.68	13.81	13.82	13.87	13.91	SB
3rd place, bronze medalist(s)	Tabia Charles (CAN)	13.29	12.68	13.24	13.18	13.84	x	13.84	
4	Prajusha Maliakkal (IND)	13.34	11.51	13.53	13.72	13.27	13.37	13.72	NR
5	Sarah Nambawa (UGA)	13.34	13.55	13.55	x	x	13.71	13.71	
6	Nadia Williams (ENG)	x	13.51	13.66	13.58	x	x	13.66	
7	Mayookha Johny (IND)	13.43	13.58	13.32	13.49	x	13.45	13.58	
8	Yasmine Regis (ENG)	12.27	13.55	x	13.44	13.27	x	13.55	SB
9	Iworima Otonye (NGR)	12.42	13.21	13.18				13.21	
10	Gayathri Govindaraj (IND)	12.96	x	x				12.96	
11	Kay-De Vaughn (BIZ)	x	x	x				NM	
