= Archery at the 2010 Commonwealth Games – Women's compound individual =

The women's compound recurve archery event at the 2010 Commonwealth Games was part of the archery programme and took place at the Yamuna Sports Complex.

== Ranking Round ==
Rank	Archer	Score
1	Doris Jones (CAN)	698
2	Nicky Hunt (ENG)	697
3	Claudine Jennings (SCO)	692
4	Nichola Simpson (ENG)	689
5	Tracey McGowan (SCO)	687
6	Fiona Hyde (AUS)	686
7	Ashley Wallace (CAN)	686
8	Lucy O´Sullivan (JER)	683
9	Camille Bouffard-Demers (CAN)	681
10	Fatin Mat Salleh (MAS)	681
11	Tracey Anderson (WAL)	680
12	Stephanie Croskery (NZL)	679
13	Cassie McCall (AUS)	676
14	Danielle Brown (ENG)	676
15	Gagandeep Kaur (IND)	675
16	Rebecca Darby (AUS)	674

Rank	Archer	Score
17	Jhano Hansdah (IND)	674
18	Jorina Coetzee (RSA)	672
19	Amanda McGregor (NZL)	671
20	Aalin George (IOM)	670
21	Bheigyabati Chanu (IND)	667
22	Nor Ishak (MAS)	666
23	Emma Parker (NIR)	663
24	Janette Howells (WAL)	661
25	Saritha Cham Nong (MAS)	660
26	Susan Maitland (SCO)	659
27	Jeanette Howells (WAL)	658
28	Sarah Rigby (IOM)	658
29	Elizabeth Mitchell (NZL)	655
30	Rosa Ford (NFI)	644
31	Maria Dikomiti (CYP)	644
32	Joanne Snell (NFI)	637

== Finals ==
Quarterfinals
1	Doris Jones (CAN)	6
24	Janette Howells (WAL)	0
5	Tracey McGowan (SCO)	4
13	Cassie McCall (AUS)	6
14	Danielle Brown (ENG)	5
6	Fiona Hyde (AUS)	6
10	Fatin Mat Salleh (MAS)	2
2	Nicky Hunt (ENG)	6

Semifinals
1	Doris Jones (CAN)	7
13	Cassie McCall (AUS)	3
6	Fiona Hyde (AUS)	2
2	Nicky Hunt (ENG)	6

Final
1	Doris Jones (CAN)	4
2	Nicky Hunt (ENG)	6
Third place
13	Cassie McCall (AUS)	7
6	Fiona Hyde (AUS)	3
