= Sirla Pera =

Cook Island weightlifter

Personal information
- Full name: Sirla Pera
- Born: 28 August 1992 (age 33)
- Weight: 93.67 kg (206.5 lb)

Sport
- Country: Cook Islands
- Sport: Weightlifting
- Weight class: 94 kg
- Team: National team
- Updated on 18 October 2016

Sirla Pera (born 28 August 1992) is a Cook Island male weightlifter, competing in the 94 kg category and representing Cook Islands at international competitions. He participated at the 2010 Commonwealth Games in the 94 kg event.

== Major competitions ==
Year	Venue	Weight	Snatch (kg)				Clean & Jerk (kg)				Total	Rank
Year	Venue	Weight	1	2	3	Rank	1	2	3	Rank	Total	Rank
Commonwealth Games
2010	(Indonesia) Delhi, India	94 kg	102	106	110	—N/a	132	135	~~141~~	—N/a	245	12
