= Swimming at the 2010 Commonwealth Games – Women's 200 metre backstroke =

The Women's 200 metre backstroke event at the 2010 Commonwealth Games took place on 8 October 2010, at the SPM Swimming Pool Complex.

Three heats were held, with each initially drawn to be of six swimmers. The heat in which a swimmer competed did not formally matter for advancement, as the swimmers with the top eight times from the entire field qualified for the finals.

== Heats ==
=== Heat 1 ===
Rank	Lane	Name	Nationality	Time	Notes
1	4	Meagen Nay	Australia	2:09.53	Q, CG
2	5	Stephanie Proud	England	2:11.02	Q
3	3	Sinead Russell	Canada	2:13.23	
4	2	Chelsey Wilson	Northern Ireland	2:20.48	
5	7	Ananya Panigrahi	India	2:34.27	
–	6	Georgia Davies	Wales		DNS

=== Heat 2 ===
Rank	Lane	Name	Nationality	Time	Notes
1	4	Belinda Hocking	Australia	2:11.79	Q
2	3	Genevieve Cantin	Canada	2:12.87	Q
3	5	Gemma Spofforth	England	2:12.93	Q
4	6	Melanie Nocher	Northern Ireland	2:14.23	
5	2	Kiera Aitken	Bermuda	2:25.74	
6	7	Arti Ghorpade	India	2:33.95	

=== Heat 3 ===
Rank	Lane	Name	Nationality	Time	Notes
1	3	Melissa Ingram	New Zealand	2:09.43	Q, CG
2	5	Emily Seebohm	Australia	2:10.01	Q
3	4	Elizabeth Simmonds	England	2:10.07	Q
4	6	Lauren Lavigna	Canada	2:13.71	
5	7	Talisa Lanoe	Kenya	2:35.78	
–	2	Penelope Marshall	New Zealand		DNS

== Final ==
Rank	Lane	Name	Nationality	Time	Notes
1st place, gold medalist(s)	5	Meagen Nay	Australia	2:07.56	CG
2nd place, silver medalist(s)	6	Elizabeth Simmonds	England	2:07.90	
3rd place, bronze medalist(s)	3	Emily Seebohm	Australia	2:08.28	
4	7	Belinda Hocking	Australia	2:09.01	
5	8	Gemma Spofforth	England	2:09.08	
6	2	Stephanie Proud	England	2:09.12	
7	4	Melissa Ingram	New Zealand	2:09.53	
8	1	Genevieve Cantin	Canada	2:12.04	
