= Archery at the 2010 Commonwealth Games – Men's recurve individual =

The men's individual recurve archery event at the 2010 Commonwealth Games was part of the archery programme and took place at the Yamuna Sports Complex.

== Medalists ==
Gold	Rahul Banerjee; India
Silver	Jason Lyon; Canada
Bronze	Jayanta Talukdar; India

== Ranking Round ==
38 archers competed.

Seed	Archer	Score	Seed	Archer	Score	Seed	Archer	Score
1	Rahul Banerjee (IND)	679	14	Taylor Worth (AUS)	646	27	Mark Forrester (SCO)	607
2	Jayanta Talukdar (IND)	676	15	Constantinos Christodoulou (CYP)	642	28	Lakmal Rajasinghe (SRI)	606
3	Jason Lyon (CAN)	674	16	Shiek Sojeb (BAN)	641	29	Indranath Perera (SRI)	602
4	Chu Cheng (MAS)	674	17	Mark Nesbitt (NIR)	640	30	Jean Babet (MRI)	592
5	Crispin Duenas (CAN)	663	18	Arif Ibrahim (MAS)	637	31	Joseph Muaausa (SAM)	581
6	Larry Godfrey (ENG)	661	19	James Laing (SCO)	633	32	Terence Coward (JER)	578
7	Simon Terry (ENG)	660	20	Karl Watson (NIR)	632	33	Pascal Olivier (MRI)	571
8	Muhammad Abdul Rahim (MAS)	660	21	Nipun Senevirathne (SRI)	631	34	Konstantinos Loizou (CYP)	558
9	Matthew Masonwells (AUS)	655	22	Hugh MacDonald (CAN)	631	35	Amber Bali (KEN)	546
10	Emdadul Milon (BAN)	651	23	Ziaul Zia (BAN)	627	36	Wasim Yacoob (MRI)	523
11	Alan Wills (ENG)	650	24	Ian McGibbon (NIR)	624	37	Peter Bwire (UGA)	441
12	Matthew Gray (AUS)	649	25	Simon Needham (SCO)	624	38	Siosifa Taumoepeau (TON)	432
13	Tarundeep Rai (IND)	647	26	Mimis El Hellali (CYP)	619			

=== Finals ===
Semifinals
Rahul Banerjee (IND)	6
Matthew Gray (AUS)	5
Jason Lyon (CAN)	6
Jayanta Talukdar (IND)	0

Final
Rahul Banerjee (IND)	6, T9
Jason Lyon (CAN)	5, T8
Bronze medal match
Matthew Gray (AUS)	4
Jayanta Talukdar (IND)	6

== Section 1 ==
Round of 64
1	Rahul Banerjee (IND)	-
-	BYE	-
33	Pascal Olivier (MRI)	2
32	Terence Coward (JER)	4
17	Mark Nesbitt (NIR)	-
-	BYE	-
-	BYE	-
16	Shiek Sojeb (BAN)	-
9	Matt Masonwells (AUS)	-
BYE	-
-	BYE	-
24	Ian McGibbon (NIR)	-
25	Simon Needham (SCO)	-
-	BYE	-
-	BYE	-
8	Muhammad Abdul Rahim (MAS)	-

Round of 32
1	Rahul Banerjee (IND)	4
32	Terence Coward (JER)	0
17	Mark Nesbitt (NIR)	2
16	Shiek Sojeb (BAN)	4
9	Matt Masonwells (AUS)	4
24	Ian McGibbon (NIR)	0
25	Simon Needham (SCO)	0
8	Muhammad Abdul Rahim (MAS)	4

Round of 16
1	Rahul Banerjee (IND)	4
16	Shiek Sojeb (BAN)	0
9	Matt Masonwells (AUS)	4
8	Muhammad Abdul Rahim (MAS)	2

Quarterfinals
1	Rahul Banerjee (IND)	6
9	Matt Masonwells (AUS)	5

== Section 2 ==
Round of 64
5	Crispin Duenas (CAN)	-
-	BYE	-
37	Peter Bwire (UGA)	0
28	Lakmal Rajasinghe (SRI)	4
21	Nipun Senevirathne (SRI)	-
-	BYE	-
-	BYE	-
12	Matthew Gray (AUS)	-
13	Tarundeep Rai (IND)	-
-	BYE	-
-	BYE	-
20	Karl Watson (AUS)	-
29	Indranath Perera (SRI)	4
36	Wasim Yacoob (MRI)	0
-	BYE	-
4	Chu Sian Cheng (MAS)	-

Round of 32
5	Crispin Duenas (CAN)	4
27	Lakmal Rajasinghe (SRI)	2
21	Nipun Senevirathne (SRI)	2
12	Matthew Gray (AUS)	4
13	Tarundeep Rai (IND)	4
20	Karl Watson (AUS)	0
29	Indranath Perera (SRI)	0
4	Chu Sian Cheng (MAS)	4

Round of 16
5	Crispin Duenas (CAN)	0
12	Matthew Gray (AUS)	4
13	Tarundeep Rai (IND)	0
4	Chu Sian Cheng (MAS)	4

Quarterfinals
12	Matthew Gray (AUS)	6
4	Chu Sian Cheng (MAS)	4

== Section 3 ==
Round of 64
3	Jason Lyon (CAN)	-
-	BYE	-
35	Amber Bali (KEN)	0
30	Jean Babet (MRI)	4
19	James Laing (SCO)	-
-	BYE	-
-	BYE	-
14	Taylor Worth (AUS)	-
11	Alan Wills (ENG)	-
-	BYE	-
-	BYE	-
22	Hugh MacDonald (CAN)	-
27	Mark Forrester (SCO)	4
38	Siosifa Taumoepeau (TON)	0
-	BYE	-
6	Larry Godfrey (ENG)	-

Round of 32
3	Jason Lyon (CAN)	4
30	Jean Babet (MRI)	0
19	James Laing (SCO)	4
14	Taylor Worth (AUS)	2
11	Alan Wills (ENG)	4
22	Hugh MacDonald (CAN)	0
27	Mark Forrester (SCO)	0
6	Larry Godfrey (ENG)	4

Round of 16
3	Jason Lyon (CAN)	4
19	James Laing (SCO)	2
11	Alan Wills (ENG)	0
6	Larry Godfrey (ENG)	4

Quarterfinals
3	Jason Lyon (CAN)	7
6	Larry Godfrey (ENG)	3

== Section 4 ==
Round of 64
7	Simon Terry (ENG)	-
-	BYE	-
-	BYE	-
26	Mimis El Helali (CYP)	-
23	Ziaul Zia (BAN)	-
-	BYE	-
-	BYE	-
10	Emdadul Milon (BAN)	-
15	Constantinos Christodolou (CYP)	-
-	BYE	-
-	BYE	-
18	Arif Ibrahim (MAS)	-
31	Joseph Muaausa (SAM)	0
34	Konstantinos Loizou (CYP)	4
-	BYE	-
2	Jayanta Talukdar (IND)	-

Round of 32
7	Simon Terry (ENG)	4
26	Mimis El Helali (CYP)	2
23	Ziaul Zia (BAN)	3, T6
10	Emdadul Milon (BAN)	4, T8
15	Constantinos Christodolou (CYP)	4, T9
18	Arif Ibrahim (MAS)	3, T9
34	Konstantinos Loizou (CYP)	0
2	Jayanta Talukdar (IND)	4

Round of 16
7	Simon Terry (ENG)	4
10	Emdadul Milon (BAN)	2
15	Constantinos Christodolou (CYP)	1
2	Jayanta Talukdar (IND)	5

Quarterfinals
10	Simon Terry (ENG)	2
2	Jayanta Talukdar (IND)	6
