= Diving at the 2010 Commonwealth Games =

- Venue: Dr. S.P. Mukherjee Swimming Stadium, Talkatora Gardens
- Location: Delhi, India
- Dates: 4 to 13 October 2010

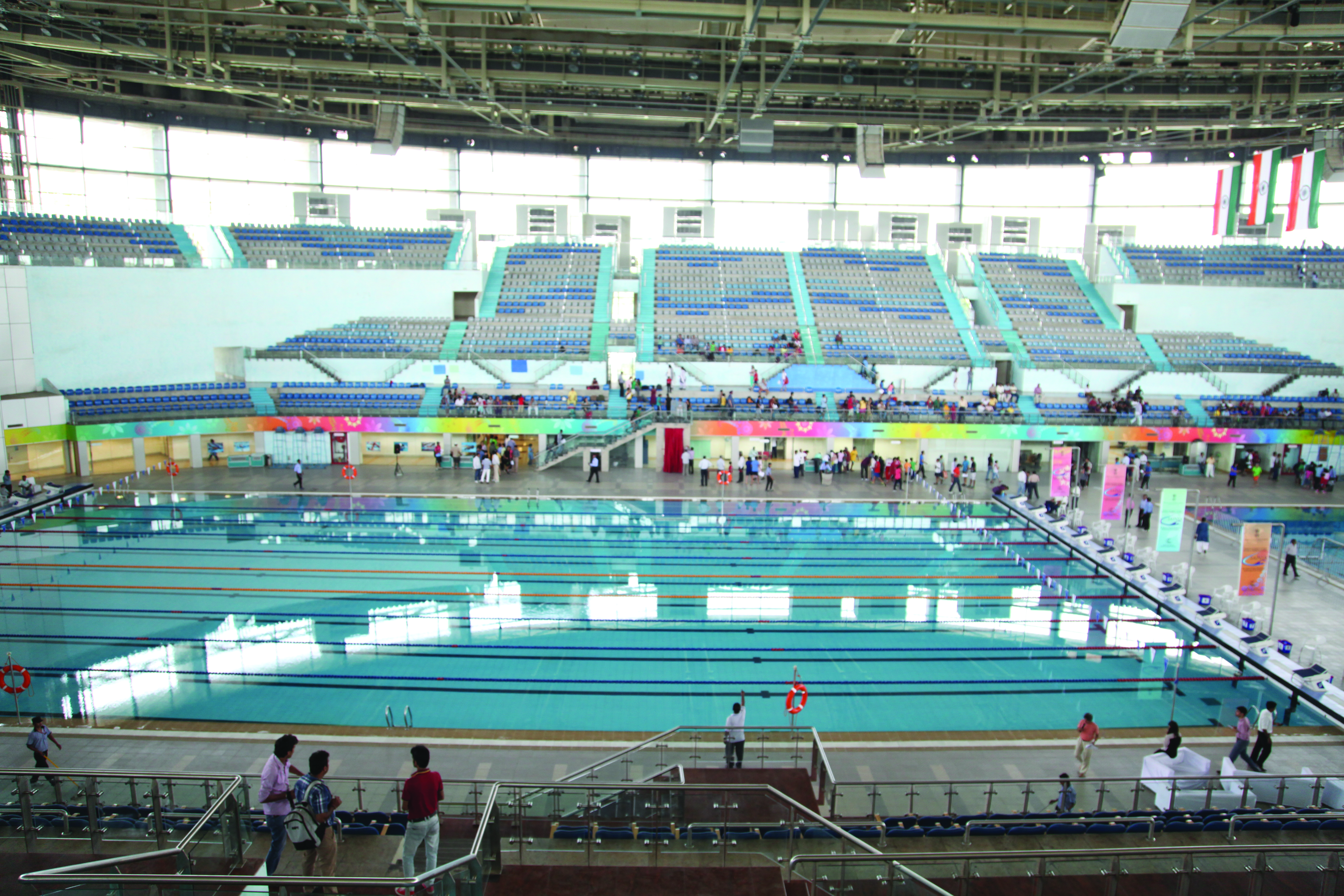
The Dr. S.P. Mukherjee Swimming Stadium

Diving at the 2010 Commonwealth Games was the 19th appearance of Diving at the Commonwealth Games. Competition was held in Delhi, India, from 5 to 11 October 2010 and featured contests in ten events.

The events were held at the Dr. S.P. Mukherjee Swimming Stadium in Talkatora Gardens.

Canada topped the medal table by virtue of winning five gold medals.

== Medal table ==
Rank	Nation	Gold	Silver	Bronze	Total
1	Canada	5	2	2	9
2	Australia	2	7	6	15
3	England	2	0	0	2
4	Malaysia	1	1	2	4
Totals (4 entries)		10	10	10	30

== Medallists ==
=== Men ===
Event	Gold	Silver	Bronze
1 metre springboard	Alexandre Despatie; Canada	Matthew Mitcham; Australia	Scott Robertson; Australia
3 metre springboard	Alexandre Despatie; Canada	Reuben Ross; Canada	Grant Nel; Australia
10 metre platform	Tom Daley; England	Matthew Mitcham; Australia	Bryan Nickson Lomas; Malaysia
Synchronised; 3 metre springboard	Canada; Alexandre Despatie; Reuben Ross	Australia; Matthew Mitcham; Ethan Warren	Malaysia; Bryan Nickson Lomas; Yeoh Ken Nee
Synchronised; 10 metre platform	England; Max Brick; Tom Daley	Australia; Matthew Mitcham; Ethan Warren	Canada; Eric Sehn; Kevin Geyson

=== Women ===
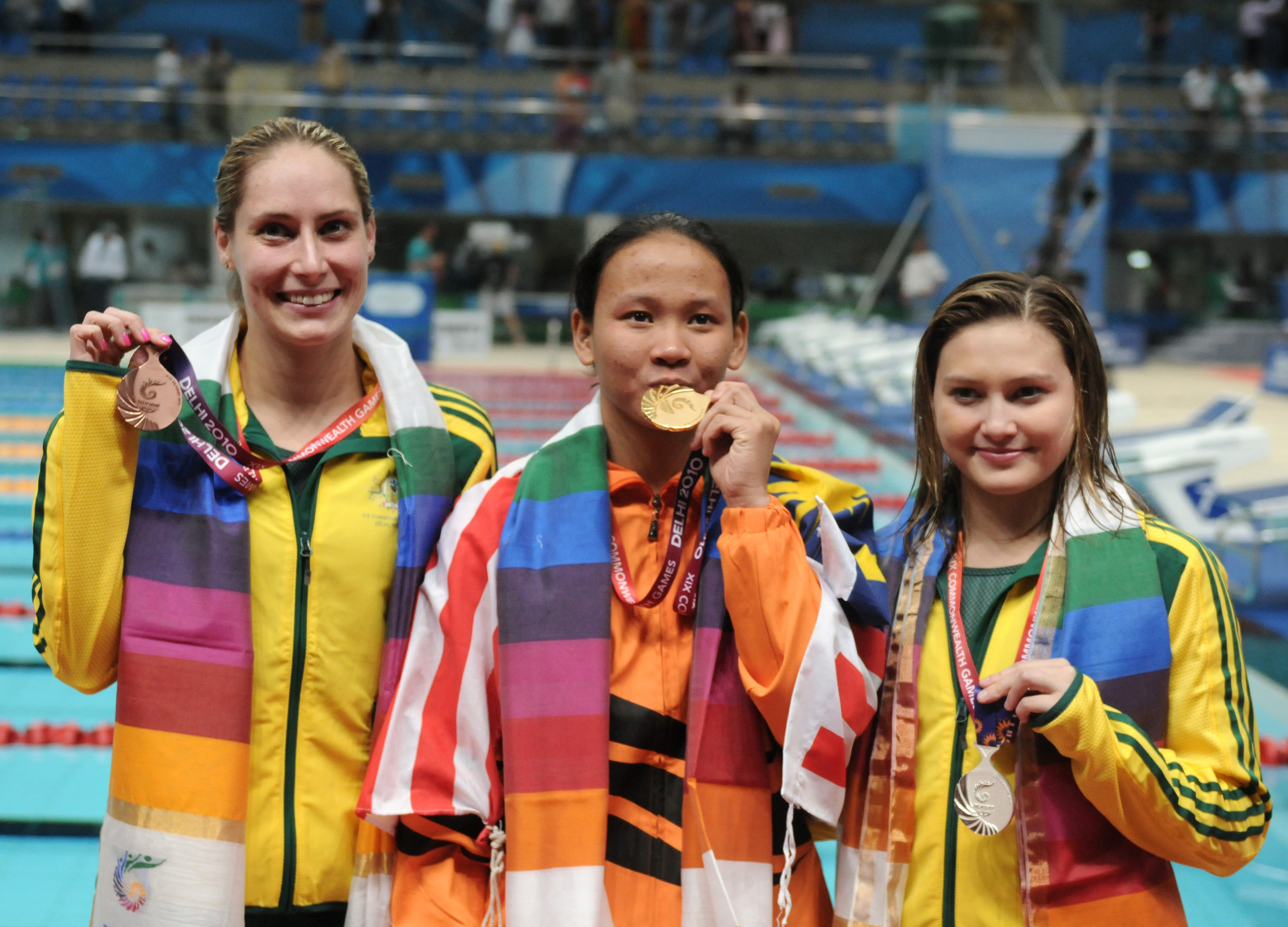
XIX Commonwealth Games-2010 Delhi Winners of (Women`s) Swimming 10M Platform Diving, Pamg Pandelela Rinong of Malaysia (Gold), Melissa Wu of Australia (Silver) and Alexandra Croak of Australia (Bronze)

Event	Gold	Silver	Bronze
1 metre springboard	Jennifer Abel; Canada	Sharleen Stratton; Australia	Emilie Heymans; Canada
3 metre springboard	Sharleen Stratton; Australia	Jennifer Abel; Canada	Jaele Patrick; Australia
10 metre platform	Pandelela Rinong Pamg; Malaysia	Melissa Wu; Australia	Alexandra Croak; Australia
Synchronised; 3 metre springboard	Canada; Jennifer Abel; Emilie Heymans	Australia; Briony Cole; Sharleen Stratton	Australia; Jaele Patrick; Olivia Wright
Synchronised; 10 metre platform	Australia; Melissa Wu; Alexandra Croak	Malaysia; Pandelela Rinong Pamg; Leong Mun Yee	Australia; Briony Cole; Anabelle Smith

== Participating nations ==
- Australia (12)
- Canada (10)
- England (12)
- India (8)
- Malaysia (11)
- New Zealand (1)
- Scotland (3)
