= Ayanna Alexander =

Trinidad and Tobago triple jumper

Personal information
- Nationality: Trinidadian
- Born: 20 July 1982 (age 43) Trinidad and Tobago
- Height: 1.73 m (5 ft 8 in)
- Weight: 61 kg (134 lb)

Sport
- Sport: athletics
- Events: Triple jump, Long jump
- College team: Louisiana Tech
- Coached by: Emanuel "Skeeter" Jackson

Achievements and titles
- Personal best: Triple jump: 14.40 m
Medal record
Women's athletics
Representing Trinidad and Tobago
Commonwealth Games
Silver medal – second place	2010 Delhi	Triple jump
Bronze medal – third place	2014 Scotland	Triple jump
- Updated on 9 January 2015

Ayanna Alexander is a Trinidad and Tobago track and field athlete. She is the only women in the country's history to compete at an Olympic Games in the women's triple jump. Alexander competes primarily in the triple jump and some times the long jump. She competed in track and field collegiately in the United States at Louisiana Tech University and at McLean High School in McLean, VA. She is the Trinidad and Tobago national record holder in the triple jump at 14.40 meters. and is the first and only athlete from Trinidad and Tobago to qualify in the triple jump for the Olympic Games.

== Personal bests ==
Event	Result	Venue	Date
Outdoor
100 m	12.26 s (wind: +0.1 m/s)	Port of Spain, Trinidad and Tobago	13 Aug 2011
200 m	24.85 s (wind: -1.4 m/s)	Lafayette, United States	19 Mar 2005
400 m	55.29 s	Baton Rouge, United States	16 Mar 2002
100 m hurdles	14.60 s (wind: +1.4 m/s) (ht)	Tulsa, United States	13 May 2005
Long jump	6.28 m (wind: +1.3 m/s)	Port of Spain, Trinidad and Tobago	24 Jun 2012
Triple jump	14.40 m (wind: 0.0 m/s)	Alexandria, United States	28 Aug 2014
Indoor
Long jump	5.93 m	Fairfax, United States	26 Jan 2013
Triple jump	13.99 m	Blacksburg, United States	20 Feb 2010

== Competition record ==
Year	Competition	Venue	Position	Event	Notes
Representing Trinidad and Tobago
2007	NACAC Championships	San Salvador, El Salvador	1st	Triple jump	13.29 m
2007	Pan American Games	Rio de Janeiro, Brazil	7th	Triple jump	13.21 m
2008	Central American and Caribbean Championships	Cali, Colombia	3rd	Triple jump	13.30 m
2009	Central American and Caribbean Championships	Havana, Cuba	5th	Triple jump	13.71 m
2010	Central American and Caribbean Games	Mayagüez, Puerto Rico	3rd	Triple jump	13.64 m
2010	Commonwealth Games	Delhi, India	11th	Long jump	5.87 m
2010	Commonwealth Games	Delhi, India	2nd	Triple jump	13.91 m
2011	Central American and Caribbean Championships	Mayagüez, Puerto Rico	7th	Long jump	6.06 m
2011	Central American and Caribbean Championships	Mayagüez, Puerto Rico	1st	Triple jump	13.50 m
2011	Pan American Games	Guadalajara, Mexico	5th	Triple jump	13.54 m
2012	Olympic Games	London, United Kingdom	14th (q)	Triple jump	14.09 m
2013	Central American and Caribbean Championships	Morelia, Mexico	9th	Long jump	5.70 m
2013	Central American and Caribbean Championships	Morelia, Mexico	2nd	Triple jump	13.17 m
2014	Commonwealth Games	Glasgow, United Kingdom	23rd (q)	Long jump	5.77 m
2014	Commonwealth Games	Glasgow, United Kingdom	3rd	Triple jump	14.01 m
2014	Pan American Sports Festival	Mexico City, Mexico	6th	Triple jump	13.49 m A (+1.3 m/s)
2014	Central American and Caribbean Games	Xalapa, Mexico	8th	Triple jump	12.94 m A (-0.5 m/s)
2015	Pan American Games	Toronto, Canada	8th	Triple jump	13.83 m
2015	NACAC Championships	San José, Costa Rica	5th	Triple jump	13.68 m
2016	World Indoor Championships	Portland, United States	–	Triple jump	NM
2018	Commonwealth Games	Gold Coast, Australia	6th	Triple jump	13.47 m
2018	Central American and Caribbean Games	Barranquilla, Colombia	14th	Long jump	5.83 m (w)
2018	Central American and Caribbean Games	Barranquilla, Colombia	9th	Triple jump	13.18 m
2018	NACAC Championships	Toronto, Canada	6th	Triple jump	12.94 m
