= Kevin Geyson =

Canadian diver (born 1984)

Personal information
- Full name: Kevin Alan Geyson
- Born: 12 April 1984 (age 42) Winnipeg, Manitoba, Canada
- Height: 178 cm (5 ft 10 in)
- Weight: 63 kg (139 lb)

Sport
- Country: Canada
- Sport: Diving
- Event: 10 m
- Club: Revolution
- Coached by: Dallas Lu dwick
Medal record
Men's Diving
Representing Canada
Pan American Games
Bronze medal – third place	2011 Guadalajara	Synchronized 10 m Platform
Commonwealth Games
Bronze medal – third place	2010 Delhi	Synchronized 10 m Platform

Kevin Alan Geyson (born 12 April 1984) is a Canadian diver who specializes in the 10 m platform individual and synchronized event.

He participated at the 2010 Commonwealth Games, winning a bronze medal with partner Eric Sehn in the 10 m synchro while classifying fourth in the individual competition. At the 2011 Pan American Games he again won the bronze medal in the 10 m synchro with the same teammate while classifying 10th in the individual event.

During the 2011 World Aquatics Championships he suffered from a road accident when he was hit by a driver after alighting from a bus; the incident occurred a week after Geyson ranked 8th in the 10 m synchro. Kevin is now an athletic therapist, personal trainer and model in Canada.
