= Okoli Chukwuka =

Nigerian weightlifter (born 1980)

Personal information
- Full name: Okoli Chukwuka
- Born: 26 February 1980 (age 46)
- Weight: 92.94 kg (204.9 lb)

Sport
- Country: Nigeria
- Sport: Weightlifting
- Weight class: 94 kg
- Team: National team
- Updated on 18 October 2016

Okoli Chukwuka (born 26 February 1980) is a Nigerian male weightlifter, competing in the 94 kg category and representing Nigeria at international competitions. He won the bronze medal in the snatch at the 2007 All-Africa Games, lifting 146 kg. He participated at the 2010 Commonwealth Games in the 94 kg event.

== Major competitions ==
| Year | Venue | Weight | Snatch (kg) | | | | Clean & Jerk (kg) | | | | Total | Rank |
| Year | Venue | Weight | 1 | 2 | 3 | Rank | 1 | 2 | 3 | Rank | Total | Rank |
Commonwealth Games
| 2010 | (Indonesia) Delhi, India | 94 kg | 140 | ~~145~~ | 145 | —N/a | 170 | ~~176~~ | ~~176~~ | —N/a | 315 | 6 |
