= Weightlifting at the 2010 Commonwealth Games – Women's 75 kg =

The women's 75 kg weightlifting event was an event at the weightlifting competition, limiting competitors to a maximum of 75 kilograms of body mass. The whole competition took place on 9 October. The weightlifter from Nigeria won the gold, with a combined lift of 239 kg.

== Results ==
| Rank | Name | Country | Group | B.weight (kg) | Snatch (kg) | Clean & Jerk (kg) | Total (kg) |
|---|---|---|---|---|---|---|---|
| 1st place, gold medalist(s) | Hadiza Zakari | Nigeria | A | 78.96 | 110 | 129 | 239 |
| 2nd place, silver medalist(s) | Marie-Ève Beauchemin | Canada | A | 74.67 | 99 | 126 | 225 |
| 3rd place, bronze medalist(s) | Laishram Monika Devi | India | A | 70.61 | 95 | 121 | 216 |
| 4 | Madias Nzesso | Cameroon | A | 73.75 | 95 | 121 | 216 |
| 5 | Mary Opeloge | Samoa | A | 74.26 | 93 | 121 | 214 |
| 6 | Jenna Myers | Australia | A | 74.22 | 95 | 113 | 208 |
| 7 | Srishti Singh | India | A | 74.66 | 90 | 116 | 206 |
| 8 | Michaela Detenamo | Nauru | A | 74.24 | 90 | 110 | 200 |
| 9 | Katelynn Williams | Canada | A | 72.28 | 88 | 111 | 199 |
| 10 | Babalwa Ndleleni | South Africa | A | 73.84 | 83 | 113 | 196 |
| 11 | Amanda Phillips | Australia | A | 74.18 | 86 | 110 | 196 |
| 12 | Alberta Ampomah | Ghana | A | 72.25 | 70 | 95 | 165 |
| – | Kristin Edwards | Barbados | A | 74.17 | – | – | DNF |
| – | Arisha Erwin | Malaysia | A | 77.93 | – | – | DNF |

== See also ==
- 2010 Commonwealth Games
- Weightlifting at the 2010 Commonwealth Games
