= Athletics at the 2010 Commonwealth Games – Women's high jump =

Women's high jump at the Commonwealth Games

The Women's high jump at the 2010 Commonwealth Games as part of the athletics programme was held at the Jawaharlal Nehru Stadium on Sunday 10 October 2010.

== Records ==
World Record	2.09	Stefka Kostadinova	BUL	Rome, Italy	30 August 1987
Games Record	1.96	Hestrie Cloete	RSA	Manchester, England	30 July 2002

== Results ==
Rank	Athlete	1.68	1.73	1.78	1.83	1.88	1.91	1.91	Result	Notes
1st place, gold medalist(s)	Nicole Forrester (CAN)	-	-	o	o	o	xxx	o	1.91	
2nd place, silver medalist(s)	Sheree Francis (JAM)	-	-	o	o	o	xxx	x	1.88	
3rd place, bronze medalist(s)	Levern Spencer (LCA)	-	-	-	o	xo	xxx		1.88	
4	Vikki Hubbard (ENG)	-	-	o	o	xxx			1.83	
4	Sahana Kumari (IND)	o	o	o	o	xxx			1.83	SB
6	Jillian Drouin (CAN)	-	o	o	xxx				1.78	
6	Kay Humberstone (ENG)	o	o	o	xxx				1.78	
6	Elizabeth Lamb (NZL)	o	o	o	xxx				1.78	
6	Stephanie Pywell (ENG)	-	o	o	xxx				1.78	
10	Selloane Tsoaeli (LES)	xxo	xxo	xo	xxx				1.78	=PB
11	Ellen Pettitt (AUS)	-	o	xxo	xxx				1.78	
12	Lissa Labiche (SEY)	xo	xxx						1.68	
13	Kavya Muthanna (IND)	xxo	xxx						1.68	
