= Swimming at the 2010 Commonwealth Games – Men's 400 metre freestyle =

Men's 400 metre freestyle at the 2010 Commonwealth Games
- Venue: SPM Swimming Pool Complex
- Dates: 4 October 2010
- Competitors: 28 from 13 nations
- Winning time: 3.48.48

Medalists
gold medal	Ryan Cochrane	Canada
silver medal	Ryan Napoleon	Australia
bronze medal	David Carry	Scotland

The Men's 400 metre freestyle event at the 2010 Commonwealth Games took place on 4 October 2010, at the SPM Swimming Pool Complex.

Four heats were held, with most containing the maximum number of swimmers (eight). The heat in which a swimmer competed did not formally matter for advancement, as the swimmers with the top eight times from the entire field qualified for the finals.

== Heats ==
=== Heat 1 ===
Rank	Lane	Name	Nationality	Time	Notes
1	5	James Sanderson	Gibraltar	4:22.41	
2	3	Adam Viktora	Seychelles	4:33.64	
3	6	Ryan Govinden	Seychelles	4:49.04	
	4	Matthew Abeysinghe	Sri Lanka		DNS

=== Heat 2 ===
Rank	Lane	Name	Nationality	Time	Notes
1	4	Ryan Napoleon	Australia	3:51.06	Q
2	6	David Davies	Wales	3:51.37	Q
3	5	David Carry	Scotland	3:51.73	Q
4	3	Riaan Schoeman	South Africa	3:54.28	
5	2	Ieuan David	Wales	3:54.57	
6	7	Gagan Ullalmath	India	4:06.29	
7	1	Zhen Teo	Singapore	4:07.25	
8	8	Colin Bensadon	Gibraltar	4:17.63	NR

=== Heat 3 ===
Rank	Lane	Name	Nationality	Time	Notes
1	5	Mark Randall	South Africa	3:51.64	Q
2	6	Richard Charlesworth	England	3:53.83	Q
3	2	Blake Worsley	Canada	3:54.82	
4	3	Robert Bale	England	3:55.71	
5	4	Robert Hurley	Australia	3:57.46	
6	7	Kevin Soon	Malaysia	4:03.25	
7	1	Mandar Divase	India	4:06.02	
8	8	Bernard Blewudzi	Ghana		DNS

=== Heat 4 ===
Rank	Lane	Name	Nationality	Time	Notes
1	4	Ryan Cochrane	Canada	3:50.70	Q
2	5	Robert Renwick	Scotland	3:50.85	Q
3	3	Jean Basson	South Africa	3:53.06	Q
4	6	Daniel Coombs	England	3:54.74	
5	7	Sean Penhale	Canada	4:01.00	
6	1	Jeremy Fell Mathews	Singapore	4:07.07	
7	8	Jia Ng	Singapore	4:13.03	
8	2	Kenrick Monk	Australia		DNS

== Final ==
Rank	Lane	Name	Nationality	Time	Notes
1	4	Ryan Cochrane	Canada	3.48.48	
2	3	Ryan Napoleon	Australia	3.48.59	
3	7	David Carry	Scotland	3.50.06	
4	6	David Davies	Wales	3.50.52	
5	2	Mark Randall	South Africa	3.50.87	
6	5	Robert Renwick	Scotland	3.51.74	
7	8	Riaan Schoeman	South Africa	3.53.85	
8	1	Richard Charlesworth	England	3.58.50	
