= Swimming at the 2010 Commonwealth Games – Men's 1500 metre freestyle =

The Men's 1500 metre freestyle event at the 2010 Commonwealth Games took place on 8 and 9 October 2010, at the SPM Swimming Pool Complex.

Two heats were held. The heat in which a swimmer competed did not formally matter for advancement, as the swimmers with the top eight times from the entire field qualified for the finals.

== Heats ==
=== Heat 1 ===
Rank	Lane	Name	Nationality	Time	Notes
1	5	Mark Randall	South Africa	15:22.80	Q
2	3	Daniel Fogg	England	15:28.80	Q
3	6	Richard Charlesworth	England	15:48.01	Q
4	2	Soon Yeap	Malaysia	16:08.40	
5	7	Ullalmath Gagan	India	16:14.12	
6	1	Zhen Teo	Singapore	16:23.42	
–	4	Robert Hurley	Australia		DNS

=== Heat 2 ===
Rank	Lane	Name	Nationality	Time	Notes
1	4	Ryan Cochrane	Canada	15:33.60	Q
2	5	Heerden Herman	South Africa	15:35.44	Q
3	3	Ryan Napoleon	Australia	15:37.45	Q
4	2	David Davies	Wales	15:38.89	Q
5	6	Sean Penhale	Canada	15:56.68	Q
6	8	Mandar Divase	India	16:22.49	
7	1	Jia Ng	Singapore	16:58.80	
–	7	Thomas Haffield	Wales		DNS

== Final ==
Rank	Lane	Name	Nationality	Time	Notes
1st place, gold medalist(s)	3	Ryan Cochrane	Canada	15:01.49	
2nd place, silver medalist(s)	6	Heerden Herman	South Africa	15:03.70	
3rd place, bronze medalist(s)	5	Daniel Fogg	England	15:13.50	
4	4	Mark Randall	South Africa	15:15.40	
5	7	David Davies	Wales	15:20.38	
6	2	Ryan Napoleon	Australia	15:28.70	
7	8	Sean Penhale	Canada	15:39.39	
8	1	Richard Charlesworth	England	15:42.77	
