= Athletics at the 2010 Commonwealth Games – Women's pole vault =

Women's pole vault at the Commonwealth Games

The Women's pole vault at the 2010 Commonwealth Games as part of the athletics programme was held at the Jawaharlal Nehru Stadium on Tuesday 12 October 2010.

== Records ==
World Record	5.06	Yelena Isinbayeva	RUS	Zürich, Switzerland	28 August 2009
Games Record	4.62	Kym Howe	AUS	Melbourne, Australia	25 March 2006

== Results ==
Rank	Athlete	3.65	3.80	3.95	4.10	4.25	4.40	4.55	Result	Notes
1st place, gold medalist(s)	Alana Boyd (AUS)	-	-	-	o	o	o	xxx	4.40	=SB
2nd place, silver medalist(s)	Marianna Zachariadi (CYP)	-	-	-	o	xo	o	xxx	4.40	SB
3rd place, bronze medalist(s)	Kate Dennison (ENG)	-	-	-	o	o	xxx		4.25	
3rd place, bronze medalist(s)	Carly Dockendorf (CAN)	-	-	-	o	o	xxx		4.25	
3rd place, bronze medalist(s)	Kelsie Hendry (CAN)	-	-	-	-	o	xxx		4.25	
6	Amanda Bisk (AUS)	-	o	o	o	xxo	xxx		4.25	
7	Emma Lyons (ENG)	o	o	xo	o	xxx			4.10	
8	Gabriella Duclos-Lasnier (CAN)	-	-	-	xo	xxx			4.10	
9	Sally Peake (WAL)	-	o	o	xxx				3.95	
10	Roslinda Samsu (MAS)	-	o	xo	xxx				3.95	
11	Liz Parnov (AUS)	-	-	xxo	xxx				3.95	
12	Bryony Raine (WAL)	o	o	xxx					3.80	
	Henrietta Paxton (SCO)	-	-	-	xxx				NM	
