= Weightlifting at the 2010 Commonwealth Games – Men's 94 kg =

The Men's 94 kg weightlifting competition took place on 9 October. The weightlifter from Samoa won the gold, with a combined lift of 334 kg.

== Results ==
Rank	Name	Country	Group	B.weight (kg)	Snatch (kg)	Clean & Jerk (kg)	Total (kg)
1st place, gold medalist(s)	Faavae Faauliuli	Samoa	A	93.27	142	192	334
2nd place, silver medalist(s)	Peter Kirkbride	Scotland	A	92.89	144	189	333
3rd place, bronze medalist(s)	Benedict Uloko	Nigeria	A	89.65	140	192	332
4	David Katoatau	Kiribati	A	92.13	135	186	321
5	Nick Roberts	Canada	A	92.76	140	176	316
6	Okoli Chukwuka	Nigeria	A	92.94	145	170	315
7	Buck Ramsay	Canada	A	93.55	135	179	314
8	Teataua Tito	Kiribati	A	90.75	120	170	290
9	Abu-Bakarr Kabia	Sierra Leone	A	90.61	125	155	280
10	Ravi Bholah	Mauritius	A	91.98	125	150	275
11	James Adede	Kenya	A	89.12	121	150	271
12	Sirla Pera	Cook Islands	A	93.67	110	135	245
–	Srimal Karunarathna	Sri Lanka	A	93.69	120	–	DNF
–	Shuja Malik	Pakistan	A	89.78	–	–	DNF

== See also ==
- 2010 Commonwealth Games
- Weightlifting at the 2010 Commonwealth Games
