= Wrestling at the 2010 Commonwealth Games – Men's Greco-Roman 55 kg =

Men's Greco-Roman 55 kg competition at the 2010 Commonwealth Games in New Delhi, India, was held on 6 October at the Indira Gandhi Arena.

== Medalists ==
Gold	Rajender Kumar; India
Silver	Azhar Hussain; Pakistan
Bronze	Promise Mwenga; Canada

=== Bracket ===
Quarterfinals
Sunday Sanni (NGR)
BYE
Shane Parker (AUS)	3	0	0
Azhar Hussain (PAK)	8	7	0
Rajender Kumar (IND)	8	6	0
Kumara Yaparathna (SRI)	2	3	0
Promise Mwenga (CAN)	3	1	3
Carlo van Wyk (RSA)	6	0	1

Semifinals
Sunday Sanni (NGR)	2	0	0
Azhar Hussain (PAK)	6	3	0
Rajender Kumar (IND)	5	6	0
Promise Mwenga (CAN)	0

Finals
Azhar Hussain (PAK)	0	0	0
Rajender Kumar (IND)	5	6	0

=== Repechage ===
Quarterfinals	Semifinals				Bronze Medal Bout
	Shane Parker (AUS)	0	0	0
	Sunday Sanni (NGR)	1	6	0
					Sunday Sanni (NGR)	2	0	1
					Promise Mwenga (CAN)	0	3	3
	Kumara Yaparathna (SRI)	1	2	0
	Promise Mwenga (CAN)	3	5	0
