= Alberta Ampomah =

Ghanaian weightlifter (1994–2026)

Personal information
- Full name: Alberta Boatema Ampomah
- Nationality: Ghanaian
- Born: 3 November 1994 Accra, Ghana
- Died: 7 November 2026 (aged 32)

Sport
- Country: Ghana
- Sport: Weightlifting
- Event: Women's +75 kg
- Updated on 5 August 2012

Alberta Boatema Ampomah (3 November 1994 – 7 November 2026) was a Ghanaian weightlifter. She represented Ghana at the 2012 Summer Olympics held in London. Ampomah also represented Ghana at the weightlifting women's 75 kg category at the 2010 Commonwealth Games in Delhi, India. She placed third in the clean and jerk division at the African Olympic qualifiers, but received a wild card entry for the Olympic games. She later placed eleventh at the 2014 Commonwealth Games.

Ampomah died on 7 November 2026, at the age of 32.
