= Diving at the 2010 Commonwealth Games – Women's 10 metre platform =

The Women's 10 metre platform diving event was held on 11 October 2010 at the Dr. S.P.M. Aquatics Complex.

== Results ==
Green denotes finalists

Rank	Diver	Preliminary		Final	
Rank	Diver	Points	Rank	Points	Rank
Gold medal	Pandelela Rinong Pamg (MAS)	353.10	1	371.05	1
Silver medal	Melissa Wu (AUS)	330.75	5	369.50	2
Bronze medal	Alexandra Croak (AUS)	345.85	3	355.40	3
4	Roseline Filion (CAN)	322.60	6	353.05	4
5	Carol-Ann Ware (CAN)	298.55	8	345.40	5
6	Monique Gladding (ENG)	342.10	4	335.95	6
7	Anabelle Smith (AUS)	346.50	2	320.85	7
8	Tonia Couch (ENG)	320.25	7	315.20	8
9	Traisy Vivien Tukiet (MAS)	268.35	9	310.55	9
10	Gabe Armstrong-Scott (NZL)	253.05	11	306.70	10
11	Pamela Ware (CAN)	267.70	10	294.65	11
12	Hrutika Shriram (IND)	176.75	12	220.85	12
13	Deepti Panwar (IND)	171.60	13		
