= Kelsie Hendry =

Canadian pole vaulter (born 1982)

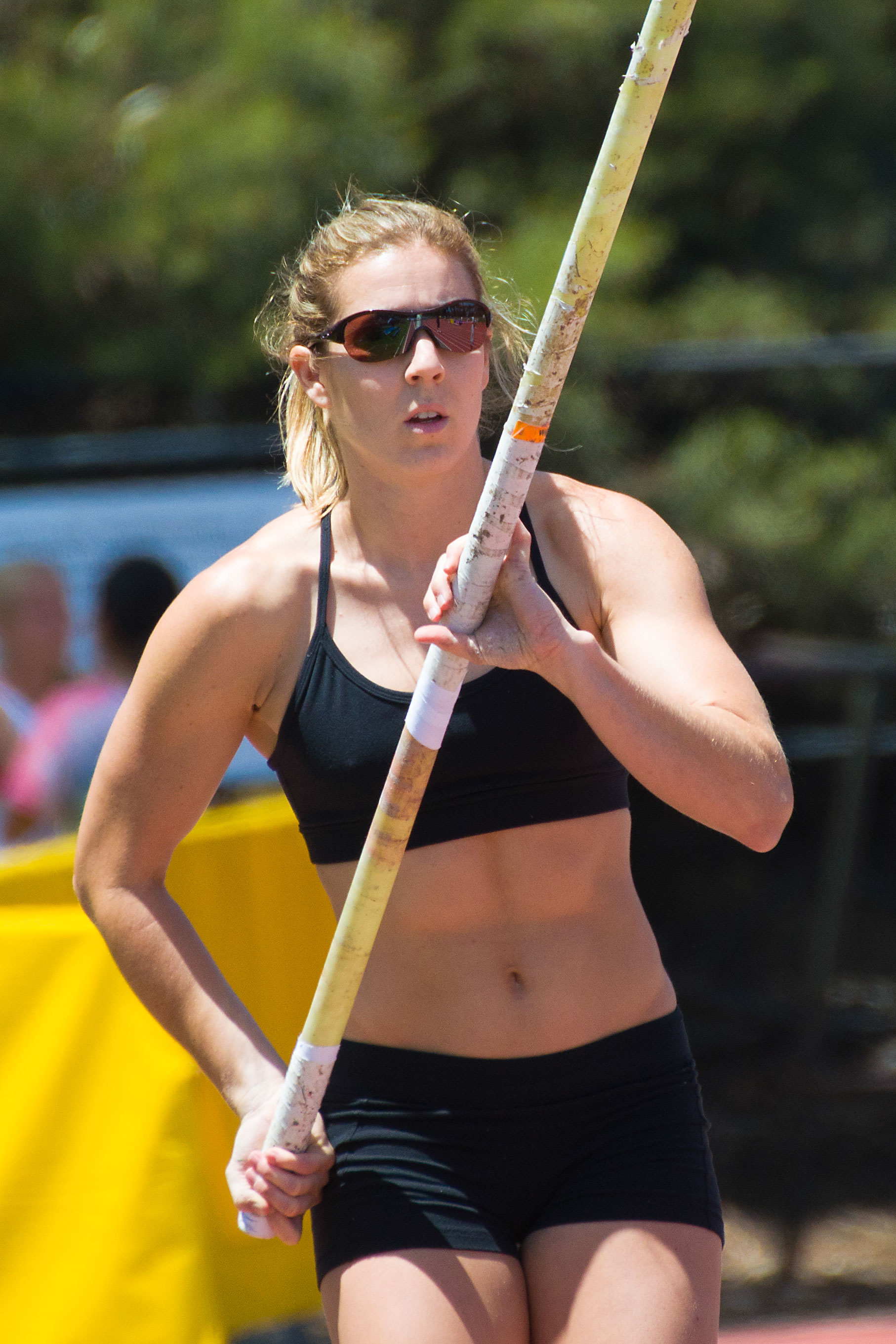

Personal information
- Nationality: Canada
- Born: 29 June 1982 (age 44) Saskatoon, Saskatchewan, Canada
- Height: 1.68 m (5 ft 6 in)
- Weight: 58 kg (128 lb)

Sport
- Sport: Athletics
- Event: Pole vault
- Club: Riversdale Athletics (CAN)
- Coached by: Greg Hull

Achievements and titles
- Personal best: Pole vault: 4.55 m (2008)
Medal record
Women's athletics
Representing Canada
Commonwealth Games
Bronze medal – third place	2010 Delhi	Pole vault

Kelsie Hendry (born June 29, 1982 in Saskatoon, Saskatchewan) is a Canadian pole vaulter. Hendry set a historic milestone as the first-ever female athlete born in Saskatoon to represent Canada at the Olympics in athletics. She also shared her three-way triumph with teammate Carly Dockendorf, and England's Kate Dennison for the bronze medal at the 2010 Commonwealth Games in Delhi, India.

Hendry achieved her first top-ten finish at the 2006 Commonwealth Games in Melbourne, Australia, where she was able to clear the height at 4.15 metres in women's pole vault. In 2008, she set both her personal best and a national record height of 4.55 metres at the Saskatchewan Provincial Championships in Prince Albert, and at the U.S.A. Track and Field High Performance Sprint and Power meet in Provo, Utah, which both guaranteed her a qualifying place for the Olympics. She also won back-to-back national titles at the Canadian Track and Field Championships in Windsor, Ontario to secure her place for the national Olympic team.

At the 2008 Summer Olympics in Beijing, Hendry competed for the women's pole vault, where she had cleared her best possible height of 4.30 metres in the qualifying rounds, finishing only in eighteenth place.

At the 2010 Commonwealth Games, Hendry captured her first top-level success by winning the bronze medal in the women's pole vault, after she cleared the height of 4.25 metres in the final round.

Hendry later emerged as a heavy favorite to qualify for her second Olympic games in London. She had already cleared an Olympic A-standard height of 4.50 metres, but finished with no result at the Canadian Track and Field Championships in Calgary, Alberta, after failing to reach a height of 4.20 metres in three attempts.

Hendry received a bachelor's degree in education at the University of Saskatchewan in Saskatoon. She also trains for the Riverside Athletics Club, under her personal and head coach Rick Petrucha.

== Competition record ==
Year	Competition	Venue	Position	Notes
Representing Canada
2001	Pan American Junior Championships	Santa Fe, Argentina	2nd	3.85 m
2002	NACAC U-25 Championships	San Antonio, Texas, United States	—	NH
2003	Universiade	Daegu, South Korea	10th	4.00 m
2004	NACAC U-23 Championships	Sherbrooke, Canada	—	NH
2005	Jeux de la Francophonie	Niamey, Niger	1st	4.15 m
2006	Commonwealth Games	Melbourne, Australia	8th	4.15 m
2007	Universiade	Bangkok, Thailand	4th	4.30 m
2008	Olympic Games	Beijing, China	18th (q)	4.30 m
2009	World Championships	Berlin, Germany	16th (q)	4.40 m
2010	World Indoor Championships	Doha, Qatar	6th	4.50 m
2010	Commonwealth Games	Delhi, India	3rd	4.25 m
2011	World Championships	Daegu, South Korea	24th (q)	4.25 m
