= Rahul Banerjee (archer) =

Indian archer (born 1986)

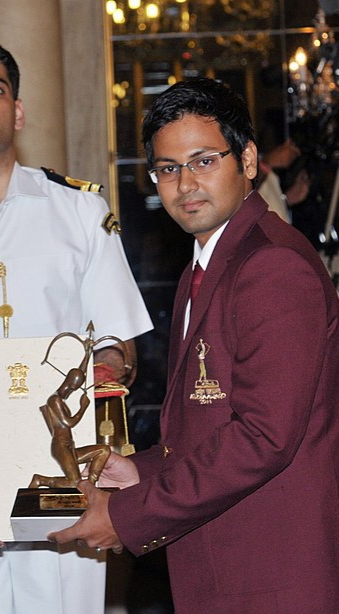
- Banerjee holding Arjuna Award at Rashtrapati Bhavan, in New Delhi in 2011

Personal information
- Born: 15 December 1986 (age 39) Baranagar, Kolkata, India
- Height: 1.79 m (5 ft 10 in)
- Weight: 80 kg (176 lb)

Sport
- Sport: Archery
- Club: Archery Academy
Medal record
Men's recurve archery
Representing India
Asian Games
Bronze medal – third place	2010 Guangzhou	Team
Asian Championships
Gold medal – first place	2007 Xi'an	Team
Silver medal – second place	2005 New Delhi	Team
Silver medal – second place	2009 Denpasar	Team
Commonwealth Games
Gold medal – first place	2010 Delhi	Individual

Rahul Banerjee (Bengali: রাহুল বন্দ্যোপাধ্যায়; born 15 December 1986) is an Indian Olympian and Arjuna Awardee archer.

== Career ==
Banerjee started archery at the age of thirteen. His sister Dola Banerjee is also an Olympic archer. His first international appearance was in Youth World Championship in 2004; he won a team silver medal, which was the first world level medal for Indian archers. He won several gold medals at the World Cups in 2008, 2009 and 2010, as well as an individual gold medal in the Asian Grand Prix in 2009–10. At the 2010 Commonwealth Games in Delhi, he won a gold medal in the individual recurve event and he is the First Indian Archer to win gold at CWG and a team bronze medal. He won a team bronze at 2010 Asian Games.He has represented India at more than 50 international competitions including 1 Olympic Games, 2 Asian Games, 3 World Championship, 3 Asian Championship, 8 World Cups, 10 Asian Grand Prix, 2 SAF Games, 1 Commonwealth Games and many more. He was member of the Indian Archery team which was ranked No. 1 in the world in August 2010. Rahul Banerjee was world ranking no.6 in Individual category in November 2008

On 21 June 2012, Banerjee qualified for the London Olympics by finishing second in the final qualification meet at Ogden, Utah, United States. At the Olympics he finished 17th individually and 9th with the Indian team.
