= Sheree Francis-Ruff =

Jamaican high jumper

Personal information
- Full name: Sheree Latoya Francis-Ruff
- Born: Sheree Latoya Francis; 20 October 1983 (age 42)
- Height: 1.75 m (5 ft 9 in) (2010)
- Weight: 61 kg (134 lb) (2010)

Sport
- Country: Jamaica
- Sport: Athletics
- Event: High jump
Medal record
CAC Championships
| Silver medal – second place | 2009 Havana | High jump |
Commonwealth Games
| Silver medal – second place | 2010 Delhi | High jump |
Central American & Caribbean Games
| Silver medal – second place | 2010 Mayagüez | High jump |

Sheree Latoya Francis-Ruff (born 20 October 1983), also known as Sheree Francis or Sheree Ruff, is a Jamaican former athlete who specialised in the high jump.

Francis-Ruff, a product of Vere Technical High in Clarendon, competed on the track team of Texas A&M.

A five-time national high jump champion, Francis-Ruff's personal best of 1.93 m was set at Spanish Town in 2010 and remained a national record until 2022. She had second-place finishes at the 2009 Central American and Caribbean Championships, 2010 Central American and Caribbean Games and 2010 Commonwealth Games.
