= Buck Ramsay =

Canadian weightlifter (born 1982)

Personal information
- Full name: Buck Ramsay
- Born: 13 August 1982 (age 43)
- Weight: 93.55 kg (206.2 lb)

Sport
- Country: Canada
- Sport: Weightlifting
- Weight class: 94 kg
- Team: National team
- Updated on 18 October 2016

Buck Ramsay (born 13 August 1982) is a Canadian male weightlifter, competing in the 94 kg category and representing Canada at international competitions. He participated at the 2010 Commonwealth Games in the 94 kg event.

== Major competitions ==
Year	Venue	Weight	Snatch (kg)				Clean & Jerk (kg)				Total	Rank
Year	Venue	Weight	1	2	3	Rank	1	2	3	Rank	Total	Rank
Commonwealth Games
2010	(Indonesia) Delhi, India	94 kg	~~135~~	~~135~~	135	—N/a	175	179	~~182~~	—N/a	314	7
