= Corrie Scott =

Scottish swimmer

Personal information
- Born: 17 August 1993 (age 32) Bellshill, Scotland

Sport
- Sport: Swimming
- Strokes: Breaststroke
- Club: University of Edinburgh
- Coach: Chris Jones
Medal record
Representing Scotland
Commonwealth Games
Bronze medal – third place	2014 Glasgow	50m breaststroke

Corrie Scott (born 17 August 1993) is a Scottish swimmer. She stood out as a junior swimmer, and joined the University of Edinburgh on their performance swimming programme where she studied chemistry. She has since established herself as one of Scotland's most decorated and prolific breaststroke swimmers of all time establishing several longstanding national records, and was inducted into the University of Edinburgh's Performance Sport Hall of Fame in 2019.

== Swimming career ==
=== Commonwealth Games ===
The biggest successes of Corrie's swimming career came in the Commonwealth Games as a member of Team Scotland. Her debut was in Delhi 2010, at the age of 17. Although she did not win any medals, she irrupted into the scene as a promising young swimmer. Her next appearance was in Glasgow 2014 in front of her home crowd. She won bronze in the 50m breaststroke and finished 9th in the 100m Breaststroke. She also competed in the 4 × 100 m medley Relay, where they took 4th place. Her last appearance was in Gold Coast 2018. She finished 12th in the 100m breaststroke event and 9th in the 50m Breaststroke event. She once again competed in the 4 × 100 m Medley Relay, taking 5th place.

=== National Championships ===
Corrie won 20 individual medals at the national level throughout her career, and also won a string of medals at British Championships and British Universities and Colleges Sport (BUCS) events. Her last big success at the national level was in the 2017 Scottish Championship, where she won both 50m and 100m Breaststroke titles.
