= Lowri Tynan =

Welsh swimmer

Personal information
- Nationality: Welsh
- Born: 13 October 1987 (age 38) Wrexham, Wales
- Height: 1.77 m (5 ft 10 in)

Sport
- Sport: Swimming
- Strokes: Breaststroke

Lowri Tynan (born 13 October 1987) is a Welsh swimmer, specialising in breaststroke at 50 and 100 metres.

== Early career ==
Lowri was born in Wrexham. Her talent was first spotted by coach Keith Barrow at a pool in Wrexham. She was the Welsh record holder for 50 metres breaststroke by age 14.

Lowri Tynan was educated at Ysgol Morgan Llwyd in Wrexham where she excelled at all sports.

== International career ==
Tynan was selected to represent Wales at the 2002 Commonwealth Games and retained her place for the 2006 Commonwealth Games.

The breakthrough came when she was selected as a wild card for the 2009 World Aquatics Championships was held at the Foro Italico sports complex in Rome, Italy. After achieving the fastest time out of the British trio of 1:08.30 in the heats of the women's 100 metres breaststroke, Lowri was selected for the women's 4×100 m medley relay. The British team finished 4th in a new British record time of 3:57.03.

On 4 March 2012 Lowri announced her retirement from all competition with immediate effect.

== Personal bests and records held ==
Welsh records (long course)
50 m breaststroke 31.03 2009 World Champs, Rome, 01/08/09
100 m breaststroke 1:08.30 2009 World Champs, Rome, 27/07/09

British records (long course)
4×100 m medley relay 3:57.03 2009 World Champs, Rome, 01/08/09
