= Achieng Ajulu-Bushell =

British swimmer, filmmaker, and writer (born 1994)

Rebecca Achieng Ajulu-Bushell
Personal information
- Full name: Rebecca Achieng Ajulu-Bushell
- Nationality: Kenya (-2009); Great Britain/England (2010-2012)
- Born: Warrington, England, UK

Sport
- Sport: Swimming
- Strokes: Breaststroke

Rebecca Achieng Ajulu-Bushell (born 1994 in Warrington, England, UK) is a retired British swimmer, who won the 50m and 100m breaststroke at the 2010 British Swimming Championships. Prior to 2010, she swam internationally for Kenya.

Born to a British mother and a Kenyan father, political activist and academic, Professor Rok Ajulu, Ajulu-Bushell left Britain at the age of three. She spent 10 years living in Kenya and then South Africa with her mother and sisters. She learned to swim in the Indian Ocean at the age of four, and swam her first competition at six.

Swimming for Kenya, she won two gold medals at the 2008 African Swimming Championships (50m and 100m breaststroke), becoming the first female to win medals for Kenya at the African Championships. She also represented Kenya at the 2009 World Championships in Rome, Italy.

In early 2010, Ajulu-Bushell decided to start swimming for Great Britain, and after a customary period without representing Kenya (1 year) and with clearance from the Kenya federation, began swimming from Great Britain. She made her senior British debut at the 2010 European Championships in Budapest, Hungary, becoming the first black woman to swim for Britain. She went on to compete for England at the 2010 Commonwealth Games in Delhi, India.

Ajulu-Bushell attended Plymouth College and was a classmate of Olympic diving medalist Tom Daley, but moved to London as she stepped up her preparation for the 2012 Summer Olympics in London, attending Notting Hill and Ealing High School.

Ajulu-Bushell withdrew from competitive swimming in 2012, following a plateau in form, and did not seek entry to the 2012 Games. In February 2012, she announced the withdrawal was permanent.

In October 2012, she took up a place at Brasenose College, Oxford. Ajulu-Bushell graduated BFA from the Ruskin School of Art in 2015. After setting up a communications and media agency called Nyar K'Odero Group, she turned to writing and filmmaking, directing and producing the critically acclaimed documentary, Breakfast in Kisumu, it had its international premier at IDFA in 2019, nominated in the IDFA Competition for Short Documentary. The documentary, edited by Mdhamiri Á Nkemi, received a four-star review from The Guardian as part of an anthology, securing a distribution contract with the streaming platform, True Story. Ajulu-Bushell's essay, Hegemanic America (2021), won the annual US National 'Justice For' essay prize.

Ajulu-Bushell joined the Department of African Cultural Studies of UW-Madison as a grad student in August 2020 to begin her PhD. She also started advocating for greater diversity in swimming, talking about racial inequalities in swimming in a 2020 interview with Sky Sports for Black History Month. She has since spoken about her own experience of racism during her swimming career.

In 2024, Ajulu-Bushell published an autobiography These Heavy Black Bones (Canongate Books).
