= Stefan Hirniak =

Canadian swimmer (born 1985)

Personal information
- Full name: Stefan Max Hirniak
- Nationality: Canada
- Born: February 5, 1985 (age 41) New Brunswick, New Jersey
- Height: 1.87 m (6 ft 2 in)
- Weight: 86.5 kg (191 lb)

Sport
- Sport: Swimming
- Strokes: Freestyle and butterfly
- Club: Island Swimming
- College team: University of Virginia
Medal record
Stefan Hirniak
Men's swimming
Commonwealth Games
Bronze medal – third place	2010 Delhi	200m butterfly
Pan American Games
Bronze medal – third place	2007 Rio de Janeiro	4x200 m freestyle

Stefan Max Hirniak (born February 5, 1985) is a swimmer from Canada, who mostly competes in the freestyle and butterfly events. He claimed a bronze medal (4 × 200 m freestyle relay) at the 2007 Pan American Games in Rio de Janeiro, Brazil.

At the 2010 Commonwealth Games in Delhi Hirniak won bronze in the 200 m butterfly during the first day of competition.

== See also ==
- World record progression 4 × 200 metres freestyle relay
