= Erica Morningstar =

Canadian swimmer (born 1989)

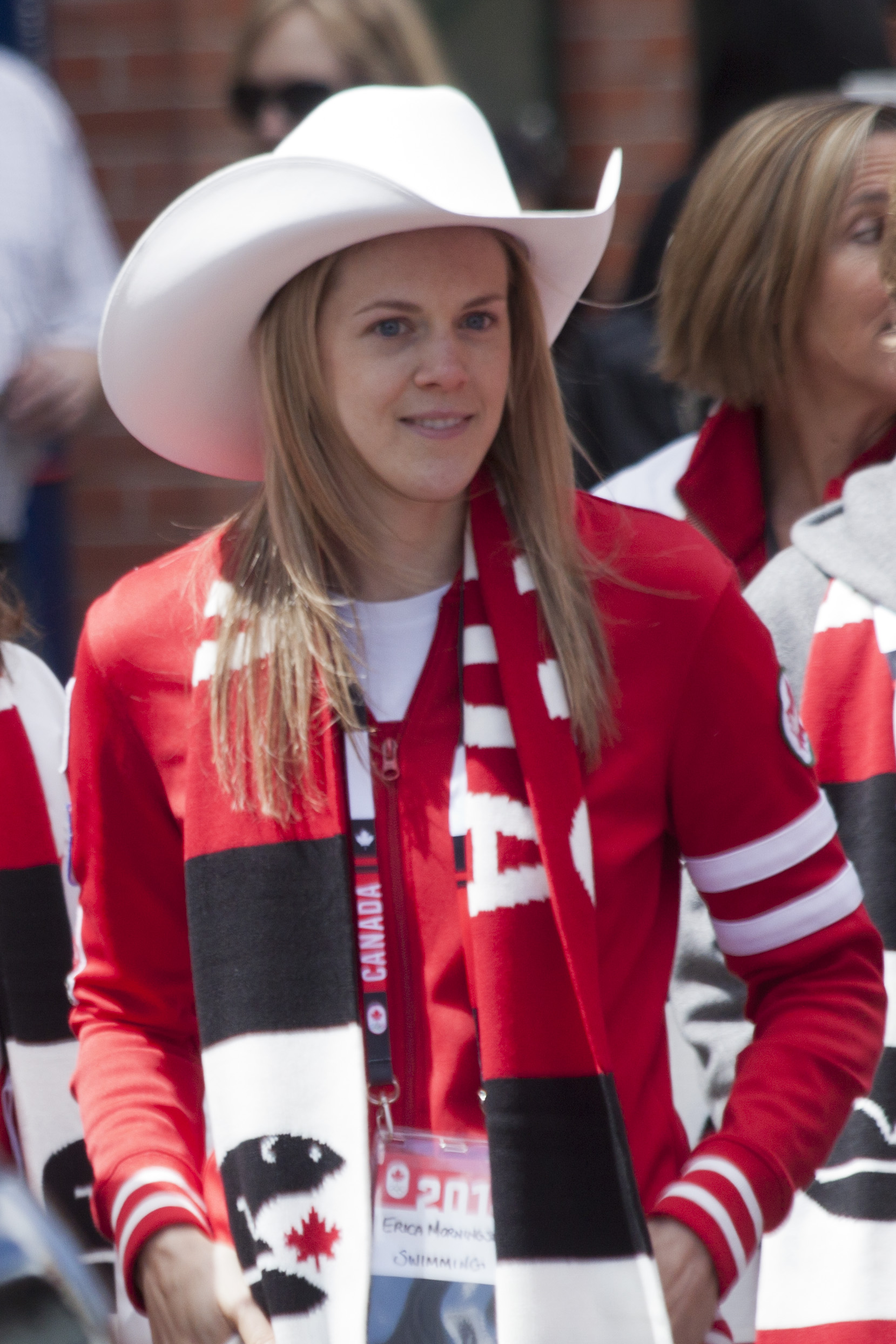
- Morningstar in Calgary, 2014

Personal information
- Full name: Erica Rachelle Morningstar
- National team: Canada
- Born: March 3, 1989 (age 37) Regina, Saskatchewan
- Height: 1.78 m (5 ft 10 in)
- Weight: 64 kg (141 lb)

Sport
- Sport: Swimming
- Strokes: Freestyle
- College team: University of Calgary
Medal record
Women's swimming
Representing Canada
Pan Pacific Championships
Silver medal – second place	2006 Victoria	4×100 m freestyle
Bronze medal – third place	2010 Irvine	4×100 m freestyle
Commonwealth Games
Bronze medal – third place	2006 Melbourne	4×100 m medley
Bronze medal – third place	2006 Melbourne	4×100 m freestyle

Erica Rachelle Morningstar (born March 3, 1989) is a Canadian swimmer who has competed in international events including the 2008 Summer Olympics, and 2012 Summer Olympics.

== Early life ==
Morningstar was born in Regina, Saskatchewan. She began swimming at the age of 9. Initially she was unsure about the sport and her parents had to give her a small push to join a competitive club. She joined the Calgary Patriots and continued to swim with them until the 2008 Olympic Games, when afterwards she joined the University of Calgary Varsity Swim Team.

== 2006 Commonwealth Games ==
The 2006 Commonwealth Games, held in Melbourne, Australia, were Morningstar's debut on the Canadian national team. After setting a Canadian record in the 100-metre freestyle at the Canadian trials, she had a successful showing at the Commonwealth Games. She finished 5th in the 100-metre freestyle, and won two bronze medals in the 4x100-metre freestyle relay, as well as the 4x100-metre medley relay.

== 2006 Pan Pacific Swimming Championships ==
The 2006 Pan Pacific Swimming Championships, held in Victoria, British Columbia, were Morningstar's second event as a part of the Canadian National Team. These were also held as a trials for the 2007 World Championships for the Canadian team. Morningstar's was able to reach the standard in order to compete in the 2007 World Championships in the 100m Freestyle. The 4 X 100m Freestyle relay that was anchored by Erica won a silver medal, defeating the Australians by 0.01 seconds.

== 2007 World Aquatics Championships ==
The 2007 World Aquatics Championships, held in Melbourne, Australia, were Erica's World Championship debut. Her most successful event was the 100m Freestyle. She set a new Canadian record in a time of 54.08 in the semi-finals of the event. She went on the finish 5th in the finals.

== 2008 Olympic Games ==
The 2008 Olympic Games, held in Beijing, China, were Morningstar's first Olympics. She competed in 5 events at the games. Including the 100m Freestyle, 200 Individual Medley, 4 X 100m Freestyle Relay, 4 X 200m Freestyle Relay, and the 4 X 100m Medley Relay. The 4 X 100m Freestyle Relay and 4 X 100m Medley Relay finished 8th and 7th respectively at the games.

== 2009 CIS Championships ==
After returning from the 2008 Olympics, Morningstar joined the University of Calgary Varsity Swim Club, and started pursuing a degree in Communications. The 2009 CIS Championships, hosted by the University of British Columbia proved to be extremely successful for Morningstar as she won 7 golds, including 4 individual in the 50 Freestyle, 100 Freestyle, 200 Freestyle, and 200 Individual Medley. She also won gold in the 3 relays, leading her Dinos team to their first Women's CIS Championship banner. She also picked up Rookie of the Meet and later that year won Rookie of the Year at the University of Calgary Awards Banquet, for her performance at the CIS Championships.

== 2009 FINA World Aquatic Championships ==
Morningstar competed in her second World Aquatic Championships in 2009 when they were held in Rome, Italy. She competed in the 200IM and finished 14th.

== 2010 Season ==
2010 proved to be a rather exceptional season for Morningstar. She excelled at the varsity level with the University of Calgary, went on to represent Canada in the 2010 Pan Pacific Championships, and the 2010 Commonwealth Games. Morningstar won Female athlete of the year at the U of C for the first time and once again was unbeatable in the CIS Championships with another 7 gold medals added. She made the final in the 200IM and won a bronze medal in the 4X100m Freestyle relay at the Pan Pacific Championships. At the 2010 Commonwealth Games, she reached the semi-finals of the 100 metre freestyle, finished seventh in the 200 metre individual medley, and was a member of the team representing Canada that was disqualified from the 4 × 100 metre freestyle relay while lying in fourth place when Geneviève Saumur started her leg too early. They would have been awarded a silver medal.

== 2011 Season ==
Morningstar continued into 2011 building on the momentum she had gained from 2010. She once again won Female athlete of the year at the U of C, this time posting 6 golds and 1 silver at the CIS Championships. In the 100m Breaststroke, Morningstar showed her versatility in the water by swimming the 5th fastest short course time in the world in 2011. Morningstar continued her success into the World Championship trials where she set a new Canadian record in the 200IM, and asserted herself as one of the premier Canadian swimming talents once again. She went into the 2011 World Aquatics Championships as the 6th fastest competitor in the 200IM but finished a disappointing 12th.

She is sponsored by Speedo Canada, and regularly appears in their annual catalog.

== 2012 Season ==
At the 2012 Summer Olympics, she competed in the women's 200 m individual medley.

== Canadian Records ==
Event	Long Course/Short Course	Year Set	Time	Meet
100m Freestyle	Long Course	2007	54.08	2007 FINA World Aquatic Championships
200m Individual Medley	Long Course	2011	2:11.23	2011 Canadian World Championship Trials
4 X 100m Medley Relay	Long Course	2010	3:38.14	2010 Pan Pacific Championships
200m Individual Medley	Short Course	2011	2:06.97	2011 FINA World Swimming Cup
4 X 200m Freestyle Relay (Club Record)	Short Course	2009	7:51.80	2009 CIS Championships
4 X 100m Medley Relay (Club Record)	Short Course	2010	4:03.28	2010 CIS Championships
