= Cynthia Lemieux-Guillemette =

Canadian artistic gymnast

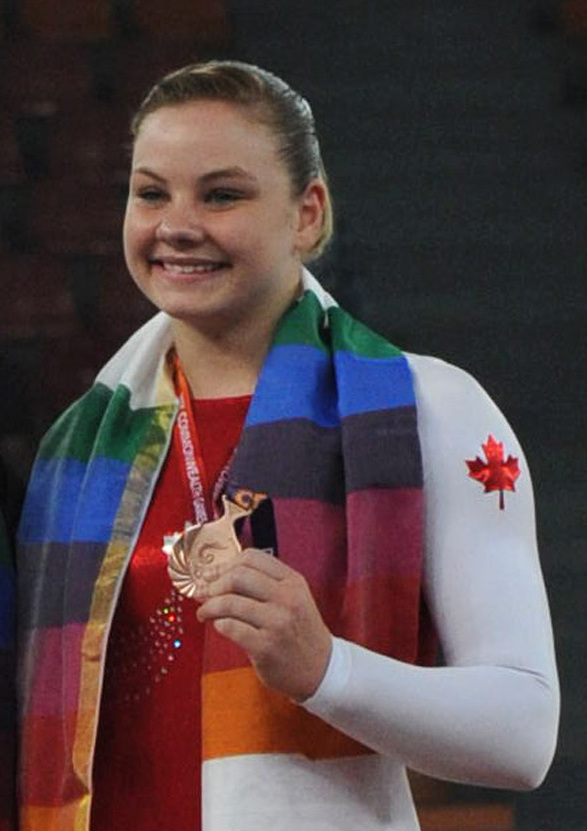
Lemieux-Guillemette in 2010

Cynthia Lemieux-Guillemette (born 31 March 1990) is a Canadian artistic gymnast. She won a bronze medal in team gymnastics at the 2010 Commonwealth Games.
