= Eric Sehn =

Canadian diver

Personal information
- Born: 16 November 1984 (age 41) Edmonton, Alberta
- Height: 175 cm (5.74 ft)
- Weight: 70 kg (154 lb)

Sport
- Country: Canada
- Sport: Diving
- Event: 10 m Platform
Medal record
Men's Diving
Representing Canada
Pan American Games
Bronze medal – third place	2011 Guadalajara	Synchronized 10 m Platform
Commonwealth Games
Bronze medal – third place	2010 Delhi	Synchronized 10 m Platform
- Updated on 7 February 2013

Eric Sehn (born 16 November 1984) is a Canadian diver. He competed for Canada at the 2012 Summer Olympics.
