= Jamaica at the 2010 Commonwealth Games =

- CGF code: JAM
- CGA: Jamaica Olympic Association
- Website: www.joa.org.jm

in Delhi, India
- Flag bearers: Opening: Closing:
- Medals Ranked 16th: Gold 2 Silver 4 Bronze 1 Total 7

Commonwealth Games appearances (overview)
- 1934; 1938–1950; 1954; 1958; 1962; 1966; 1970; 1974; 1978; 1982; 1986; 1990; 1994; 1998; 2002; 2006; 2010; 2014; 2018; 2022; 2026; 2030

Jamaica competed in the 2010 Commonwealth Games that were held in Delhi, India, from 3 to 14 October 2010. Jamaica sent a 48-member team for this edition of Commonwealth Games. Big names like Asafa Powell and Usain Bolt withdrew from the games and were not present in the squad.

== Medalists ==
Medal	Name	Sport	Event	Date
Gold	Lerone Ephraime Clarke	Athletics	Men's 100m	October 7
Gold	Trecia Smith	Athletics	Women's Triple Jump	October 9
Silver	Dorian Scott	Athletics	Men's Shot Put	October 7
Silver	Sheree Francis	Athletics	Women's High Jump	October 10
Silver	Lansford Spence	Athletics	Men's 200m	October 10
Silver	Lerone Clarke, Lansford Spence, Rasheed Dwyer, Remaldo Rose	Athletics	Men's 4 x 100 metres relay	October 12
Bronze	Nickiesha Wilson	Athletics	Women's 400m Hurdles	October 10

== See also ==
- 2010 Commonwealth Games
