= Athletics at the Commonwealth Games =

Athletics is one of several sports contested at the quadrennial Commonwealth Games competition. It has been a Commonwealth Games sport since the inaugural edition of the event's precursor, the 1930 British Empire Games. It is a core sport and must be included in the sporting programme of each edition of the Games.

== Editions ==
Games	Year	Host city	Host country	Best nation
I	1930	Hamilton, Ontario	Canada	England
II	1934	London	England	England
III	1938	Sydney	Australia	Canada
IV	1950	Auckland	New Zealand	Australia
V	1954	Vancouver, British Columbia	Canada	England
VI	1958	Cardiff	Wales	Australia
VII	1962	Perth, Western Australia	Australia	Australia
VIII	1966	Kingston	Jamaica	Australia
IX	1970	Edinburgh	Scotland	Australia
X	1974	Christchurch	New Zealand	England
XI	1978	Edmonton, Alberta	Canada	England
XII	1982	Brisbane, Queensland	Australia	England
XIII	1986	Edinburgh	Scotland	England
XIV	1990	Auckland	New Zealand	England
XV	1994	Victoria, British Columbia	Canada	England
XVI	1998	Kuala Lumpur	Malaysia	Australia
XVII	2002	Manchester	England	England
XVIII	2006	Melbourne	Australia	Australia
XIX	2010	Delhi	India	Kenya
XX	2014	Glasgow	Scotland	Kenya
XXI	2018	Gold Coast, Queensland	Australia	Australia
XXII	2022	Birmingham	England	Australia
XXIII	2026	Glasgow	Scotland	Australia

== Events ==
=== Men's events ===
No new events have been added to the men's athletics programme since the 1998 addition of the 20 km and 50 km racewalks. The roster of events has not changed since then, with the exception of the omission of the 50 km racewalk from 2010 and the 20 km racewalk in 2014. A total of 35 different events have been held in the men's competition, 23 of which were contested at the 2010 Commonwealth Games in Delhi. Many of the discontinued events were similar to modern events but at different lengths as they were contested over distances measured in Imperial units. Events with distances measured in metric units were first contested in 1970.

Event	30	34	38	50	54	58	62	66	70	74	78	82	86	90	94	98	02	06	10	14	18	Games
Current program
100 metres									X	X	X	X	X	X	X	X	X	X	X	X	X	13
200 metres									X	X	X	X	X	X	X	X	X	X	X	X	X	13
400 metres									X	X	X	X	X	X	X	X	X	X	X	X	X	13
800 metres									X	X	X	X	X	X	X	X	X	X	X	X	X	13
1500 metres									X	X	X	X	X	X	X	X	X	X	X	X	X	13
5000 metres									X	X	X	X	X	X	X	X	X	X	X	X	X	13
10,000 metres									X	X	X	X	X	X	X	X	X	X	X	X	X	13
Marathon	X	X	X	X	X	X	X	X	X	X	X	X	X	X	X	X	X	X	X	X	X	21
110 metres hurdles									X	X	X	X	X	X	X	X	X	X	X	X	X	13
400 metres hurdles									X	X	X	X	X	X	X	X	X	X	X	X	X	13
3000 metres steeplechase		X					X	X	X	X	X	X	X	X	X	X	X	X	X	X	X	16
4 × 100 metres relay									X	X	X	X	X	X	X	X	X	X	X	X	X	13
4 × 400 metres relay									X	X	X	X	X	X	X	X	X	X	X	X	X	13
20 kilometres race walk																X	X	X	X		X	5
High jump	X	X	X	X	X	X	X	X	X	X	X	X	X	X	X	X	X	X	X	X	X	21
Pole vault	X	X	X	X	X	X	X	X	X	X	X	X	X	X	X	X	X	X	X	X	X	21
Long jump	X	X	X	X	X	X	X	X	X	X	X	X	X	X	X	X	X	X	X	X	X	21
Triple jump	X	X	X	X	X	X	X	X	X	X	X	X	X	X	X	X	X	X	X	X	X	21
Shot put	X	X	X	X	X	X	X	X	X	X	X	X	X	X	X	X	X	X	X	X	X	21
Discus throw	X	X	X	X	X	X	X	X	X	X	X	X	X	X	X	X	X	X	X	X	X	21
Hammer throw	X	X	X	X	X	X	X	X	X	X	X	X	X	X	X	X	X	X	X	X	X	21
Javelin throw	X	X	X	X	X	X	X	X	X	X	X	X	X	X	X	X	X	X	X	X	X	21
Decathlon								X	X	X	X	X	X	X	X	X	X	X	X	X	X	14
Past events
100 yards	X	X	X	X	X	X	X	X														8
220 yards	X	X	X	X	X	X	X	X														8
440 yards	X	X	X	X	X	X	X	X														8
880 yards	X	X	X	X	X	X	X	X														8
1 miles	X	X	X	X	X	X	X	X														8
3 miles	X	X	X	X	X	X	X	X														8
6 miles	X	X	X	X	X	X	X	X														8
120 yards hurdles	X	X	X	X	X	X	X	X														8
440 yards hurdles	X	X	X	X	X	X	X	X														8
20 miles walk								X	X	X												3
30 kilometres race walk												X	X	X	X	X						5
50 kilometres race walk																	X	X	X			3
4 × 440 yards relay	X	X	X	X	X	X	X	X														8
Events	19	20	19	19	19	19	20	22	23	23	23	23	23	23	23	24	24	24	23	22	23	

=== Women's events ===
A total of 34 different events have been held in the women's competition, 23 of which were contested at the 2010 Commonwealth Games in Delhi. The women's program has been identical to the men's program since the 2006 Commonwealth Games (with the exception of the discontinued men's 50 km walk) when the women's 3000m steeplechase was added to the program. The 20 km racewalk was omitted from the program in 2014.

Event	30	34	38	50	54	58	62	66	70	74	78	82	86	90	94	98	02	06	10	14	Games
Current program
100 metres									X	X	X	X	X	X	X	X	X	X	X	X	12
200 metres									X	X	X	X	X	X	X	X	X	X	X	X	12
400 metres									X	X	X	X	X	X	X	X	X	X	X	X	12
800 metres									X	X	X	X	X	X	X	X	X	X	X	X	12
1500 metres									X	X	X	X	X	X	X	X	X	X	X	X	12
5000 metres																X	X	X	X	X	5
10,000 metres													X	X	X	X	X	X	X	X	8
Marathon														X	X	X	X	X	X	X	7
100 metres hurdles										X	X	X	X	X	X	X	X	X	X	X	11
400 metres hurdles									X	X	X	X	X	X	X	X	X	X	X	X	12
3000 metres steeplechase																		X	X	X	3
4 × 100 metres relay									X	X	X	X	X	X	X	X	X	X	X	X	12
4 × 400 metres relay									X	X	X	X	X	X	X	X	X	X	X	X	12
High jump	X	X	X	X	X	X	X	X	X	X	X	X	X	X	X	X	X	X	X	X	20
Pole vault																X	X	X	X	X	5
Long jump	X	X	X	X	X	X	X	X	X	X	X	X	X	X	X	X	X	X	X	X	20
Triple jump																X	X	X	X	X	5
Shot put					X	X	X	X	X	X	X	X	X	X	X	X	X	X	X	X	16
Discus throw					X	X	X	X	X	X	X	X	X	X	X	X	X	X	X	X	16
Hammer throw																X	X	X	X	X	5
Javelin throw	X	X	X	X	X	X	X	X	X	X	X	X	X	X	X	X	X	X	X	X	20
Heptathlon												X	X	X	X	X	X	X	X	X	9
Past events
110 yards	X	X	X	X	X	X	X	X													8
220-yard	X	X	X	X	X	X	X	X													8
440-yard								X													1
880-yard		X					X	X													3
1-mile	X	X	X	X	X	X	X	X													8
3000 metres										X	X	X	X	X							5
10 kilometres race walk														X	X	X					3
20 kilometres race walk																	X	X	X		3
4 × 110 yards relay					X	X	X	X													4
4 × 440 yards relay	X	X	X	X	X	X	X	X													8
Events	7	8	7	7	10	10	11	12	13	15	15	16	17	19	18	22	22	23	23	22	

=== Elite Athletes with a Disability events ===
From the 2002 Commonwealth Games a number of events have been included in the program to include elite athletes with disabilities. The inclusion of events in this category has been inconsistent over the four Games where they have been included.

Event	02	06	10	14	Games
Men's 100 metres T12	X	X			2
Men's 100 metres T37				X	1
Men's 100 metres T46			X		1
Men's 200 metres T46		X			1
Men's 1500 metres T54			X	X	2
Men's shot put F32/34/52			X		1
Men's discus throw F42-44				X	1
Men's discus throw seated		X			1
Women's 100 metres T12				X	1
Women's 100 metres T37		X	X		2
Women's 800 metres T54	X	X			2
Women's 1500 metres T54			X	X	2
Women's long jump F37/38				X	1
Women's shot put seated		X			1
Women's shot put F32-34/52/53			X		1
Events	2	5	6	6	

== All-time medal table ==
Updated after the 2026 Commonwealth Games

Rank	Nation	Gold	Silver	Bronze	Total
1	Australia	218	183	152	553
2	England	208	224	201	633
3	Canada	90	107	142	339
4	Jamaica	83	46	53	182
5	Kenya	81	71	62	214
6	South Africa	46	43	37	126
7	New Zealand	41	53	55	149
8	Nigeria	31	32	30	93
9	Scotland	24	25	40	89
10	Wales	20	20	23	63
11	Bahamas	12	15	10	37
12	Uganda	11	6	9	26
13	India	9	21	22	52
14	Trinidad and Tobago	8	16	14	38
15	Northern Ireland	8	12	2	22
16	Ghana	5	9	12	26
17	Tanzania	5	5	6	16
18	Botswana	5	4	2	11
19	Grenada	4	2	2	8
20	Pakistan	3	3	6	12
21	Guyana	3	3	1	7
22	Namibia	3	1	9	13
23	British Virgin Islands	3	0	0	3
24	Sri Lanka	2	3	2	7
25	Barbados	2	2	5	9
26	Mozambique	2	2	1	5
27	Malaysia	2	1	3	6
28	Zambia	2	0	1	3
29	Cyprus	1	5	4	10
30	Zimbabwe	1	4	8	13
31	Cameroon	1	4	4	9
32	Fiji	1	2	2	5
33	Dominica	1	2	1	4
34	Bermuda	1	1	4	6
35	Saint Lucia	1	1	3	5
36	Cayman Islands	1	0	1	2
37	Lesotho	1	0	0	1
37	Saint Kitts and Nevis	1	0	0	1
37	Saint Vincent and the Grenadines	1	0	0	1
40	Mauritius	0	3	1	4
41	Guernsey	0	0	1	1
41	Isle of Man	0	0	1	1
41	Rwanda	0	0	1	1
41	Samoa	0	0	1	1
41	Seychelles	0	0	1	1
41	Swaziland	0	0	1	1
41	The Gambia	0	0	1	1
41	Vanuatu	0	0	1	1
Totals (48 entries)		942	931	938	2,811

== See also ==
- List of Commonwealth Games records in athletics
- List of Commonwealth Games medallists in athletics (men)
- List of Commonwealth Games medallists in athletics (women)
