= Kenya at the 2010 Commonwealth Games =

- CGF code: KEN
- CGA: National Olympic Committee of Kenya

in Delhi, India
- Competitors: 371
- Flag bearers: Opening: Closing:
- Medals Ranked 6th: Gold 12 Silver 11 Bronze 9 Total 32

Commonwealth Games appearances (overview)
- 1954; 1958; 1962; 1966; 1970; 1974; 1978; 1982; 1986; 1990; 1994; 1998; 2002; 2006; 2010; 2014; 2018; 2022; 2026; 2030

Kenya competed in the 2010 Commonwealth Games held in Delhi, India, from 3 to 14 October 2010.

== Medalists ==
Medal	Name	Sport	Event	Date
Gold	Jason Dunford	Aquatics	Men's 50m Butterfly	October 6
Gold	Grace Momanyi	Athletics	Women's 10000m	October 8
Gold	Nancy Jebet Langat	Athletics	Women's 1500m	October 8
Gold	Mark Mutai	Athletics	Men's 400m	October 9
Gold	Milcah Chemos Cheywa	Athletics	Women's 3000m steeplechase	October 9
Gold	Boaz Kiplagat Lalang	Athletics	Men's 800m	October 10
Gold	Nancy Jebet Langat	Athletics	Women's 800m	October 11
Gold	Richard Kipkemboi Mateelong	Athletics	Men's 3000m steeplechase	October 11
Gold	Silas Kiplagat	Athletics	Men's 1500m	October 12
Gold	Vivian Cheruiyot	Athletics	Women's 5000m	October 12
Gold	John Kelai	Athletics	Men's Marathon	October 14
Gold	Irene Jerotich	Athletics	Women's Marathon	October 14
Silver	Eliud Kipchoge	Athletics	Men's 5000m	October 6
Silver	Doris Changeywo	Athletics	Women's 10000m	October 8
Silver	Mercy Wanjiru Njoroge	Athletics	Women's 3000m steeplechase	October 9
Silver	Richard Kiplagat	Athletics	Men's 800m	October 10
Silver	Ezekiel Cheboi	Athletics	Men's 3000m steeplechase	October 11
Silver	Daniel Salel	Athletics	Men's 10000m	October 11
Silver	James Kiplangat Magut	Athletics	Men's 1500m	October 12
Silver	Sylvia Jebiwot Kibet	Athletics	Women's 5000m	October 12
Silver	Irene Mogake	Athletics	Women's Marathon	October 14
Bronze	Mark Kosgey Kiptoo	Athletics	Men's 5000m	October 6
Bronze	Grace Wanjiru Njue	Athletics	Women's 20 km Walk	October 9
Bronze	Gladys Jerotich Kipkemoi	Athletics	Women's 3000m steeplechase	October 9
Bronze	Abraham Kiplagat	Athletics	Men's 800m	October 10
Bronze	Brimin Kiprop Kipruto	Athletics	Men's 3000m steeplechase	October 11
Bronze	Joseph Kiptoo Birech	Athletics	Men's 10000m	October 11
Bronze	Joshua Makonjio	Boxing	Light heavyweight (81 kg)	October 11
Bronze	Ines Chenonge	Athletics	Women's 5000m	October 12
Bronze	Amos Tirop Matui	Athletics	Men's Marathon	October 14

== Medals By Sport ==
Medals by sport
Sport	gold	silver	bronze	Total
Aquatics	1	0	0	1
Athletics	11	10	8	29
Boxing	0	0	1	1
Total	12	11	9	32

== See also ==
- 2010 Commonwealth Games
