= Athletics at the 2010 Commonwealth Games – Men's 3000 metres steeplechase =

Men's 3000 metres steeplechase at the Commonwealth Games

The Men's 3000 metres steeplechase at the 2010 Commonwealth Games as part of the athletics programme was held at the Jawaharlal Nehru Stadium on Monday 11 October 2010.

== Records ==
World Record	7:53.63	Saif Saaeed Shaheen	QAT	Brussels, Belgium	3 September 2004
Games Record	8:14.72	Johnstone Kipkoech	KEN	Victoria, Canada	1994

== Results ==
Rank	Athlete	Time	Notes
1st place, gold medalist(s)	Richard Mateelong (KEN)	8:16.39	
2nd place, silver medalist(s)	Ezekiel Cheboi (KEN)	8:16.47	
3rd place, bronze medalist(s)	Brimin Kipruto (KEN)	8:19.65	
4	Benjamin Kiplagat (UGA)	8:24.15	
5	Stuart Stokes (ENG)	8:32.24	SB
6	Youcef Abdi (AUS)	8:33.20	
7	Luke Gunn (ENG)	8:40.44	
8	Ben Siwa (UGA)	8:42.44	
9	Elam Singh (IND)	8:44.35	
10	Ramachandran Ramadas (IND)	8:57.63	
–	Sapolai Yao (PNG)	F^{1}	DSQ
–	Gervais Hakizimana (RWA)		DNS
