= Athletics at the 2010 Commonwealth Games – Women's 1500 metres =

2010 Commonwealth Games

Women's 1500 metres at the Commonwealth Games

The Women's 1500 metres at the 2010 Commonwealth Games as part of the athletics programme was held at the Jawaharlal Nehru Stadium on Thursday 7 October till Friday 8 October 2010.

The top four runners in each of the initial two heats plus the next four fastest runners from across the heats also qualified for the final.

== Records ==
World Record	3:50.46	Yunxia Qu	CHN	Beijing, China	11 September 1993
Games Record	4:05.27	Jackline Maranga	KEN	Kuala Lumpur, Malaysia	1998

== Heats ==
First 4 in each heat (Q) and 4 best performers (q) advance to the Semifinals.

=== Heat 1 ===
Rank	Lane	Name	Result	Notes
1	10	Viola Kibiwott (KEN)	4:08.76	Q
2	5	Helen Clitheroe (ENG)	4:09.34	Q
3	9	Nikki Hamblin (NZL)	4:09.80	Q
4	6	Stephanie Twell (SCO)	4:10.35	Q
5	2	Ciara Mageean (NIR)	4:12.11	q
6	8	Janet Achola (UGA)	4:12.12	q, NR
7	3	Jhuma Khatun (IND)	4:12.30	q, PB
8	4	Hilary Stellingwerff (CAN)	4:13.01	q
9	1	Jaisha Orchatteri (IND)	4:13.15	
10	7	Tanice Barnett (JAM)	4:48.59	

=== Heat 2 ===
Rank	Lane	Name	Result	Notes
1	9	Nancy Langat (KEN)	4:13.62	Q
2	5	Irene Jelagat (KEN)	4:13.63	Q
3	4	Nicole Edwards (CAN)	4:13.90	Q
4	6	Hannah England (ENG)	4:13.91	Q
5	11	Kaila McKnight (AUS)	4:15.22	
6	8	Kelly McNeice (NIR)	4:18.07	
7	3	Sushma Sushma Devi (IND)	4:22.05	
8	2	Salome Dell (PNG)	4:33.23	NR
9	1	Twishanna Williams (JAM)	4:36.60	PB
10	7	Jean Mukakigeri (RWA)	4:37.27	
–	10	Annet Negesa (UGA)		DNS

== Final ==
Rank	Lane	Name	Result	Notes
1st place, gold medalist(s)	3	Nancy Langat (KEN)	4:05.26	GR
2nd place, silver medalist(s)	8	Nikki Hamblin (NZL)	4:05.97	
3rd place, bronze medalist(s)	1	Stephanie Twell (SCO)	4:06.15	
4	4	Hannah England (ENG)	4:06.83	
5	5	Nicole Edwards (CAN)	4:08.16	
6	11	Irene Jelagat (KEN)	4:08.20	
7	6	Viola Kibiwott (KEN)	4:08.79	
8	12	Helen Clitheroe (ENG)	4:08.89	
9	2	Janet Achola (UGA)	4:09.51	NR
10	7	Ciara Mageean (NIR)	4:10.85	
11	10	Hilary Stellingwerff (CAN)	4:12.87	
12	9	Jhuma Khatun (IND)	4:14.95	
