= Athletics at the 2010 Commonwealth Games – Men's 1500 metres =

Men's 1500 metres at the Commonwealth Games

The Men's 1500 metres at the 2010 Commonwealth Games as part of the athletics programme was held at the Jawaharlal Nehru Stadium on Monday 11 October till Tuesday 12 October 2010.

The top four runners in each of the initial two heats plus the next four fastest runners from across the heats also qualified for the final.

== Records ==
World Record	3:26.00	Hicham El Guerrouj	MAR	Roma, Italy	14 July 1998
Games Record	3:32.16	Filbert Bayi	TAN	Christchurch, New Zealand	1974

== Heats ==
First 4 in each heat (Q) and 4 best performers (q) advance to the Final.

=== Heat 1 ===
Rank	Lane	Name	Result	Notes
1	11	James Magut (KEN)	3:40.47	Q, SB
2	9	Chaminda Wijekoon (SRI)	3:40.78	Q, PB, NR
3	13	Thomas Lancashire (ENG)	3:40.84	Q
4	5	Andrew Baddeley (ENG)	3:41.25	Q
5	10	Adrian Blincoe (NZL)	3:41.54	q
6	12	Mitchell Kealey (AUS)	3:41.64	q
7	2	Alastair Hay (SCO)	3:43.21	q
8	7	Cleveland Forde (GUY)	3:44.23	PB, NR
9	3	Hamza Chatholi (IND)	3:44.72	SB
10	8	Jon Rankin (CAY)	3:46.12	
11	4	Taylor Milne (CAN)	3:49.53	
12	14	Shifaz Mohamed (MDV)	4:17.39	PB
–	1	Shawn Pitter (JAM)		DNF
–	6	Tony Ialu (VAN)		DNS

=== Heat 2 ===
Rank	Lane	Name	Result	Notes
1	3	Gideon Gathimba (KEN)	3:41.59	Q
2	14	Silas Kiplagat (KEN)	3:41.67	Q
3	5	Jeremy Roff (AUS)	3:41.86	Q
4	8	Nick Willis (NZL)	3:42.47	Q
5	15	James Thie (WAL)	3:42.74	q
6	6	Sandeep Sandeep (IND)	3:44.55	
7	1	Jimmy Adar (UGA)	3:45.98	
8	9	Joseph Nzirorera (RWA)	3:48.40	PB
9	10	Barae Saqware (TAN)	3:48.82	
10	11	James McIlroy (NIR)	3:50.13	
11	7	Chauncy Master (MAW)	3:52.43	
12	4	Colin McCourt (ENG)	3:59.68	
13	2	Baba Gibba (GAM)	4:06.14	
14	12	Alusine Deen-Sesay (SLE)	4:13.19	
15	13	Hameed Mohamed (MDV)	4:26.10	SB

== Final ==
Rank	Lane	Name	Result	Notes
1st place, gold medalist(s)	7	Silas Kiplagat (KEN)	3:41.78	
2nd place, silver medalist(s)	6	James Magut (KEN)	3:42.27	
3rd place, bronze medalist(s)	4	Nick Willis (NZL)	3:42.38	
4	5	Chaminda Wijekoon (SRI)	3:42.93	
5	12	Gideon Gathimba (KEN)	3:43.11	
6	9	Andrew Baddeley (ENG)	3:43.33	
7	2	Jeremy Roff (AUS)	3:43.53	
8	11	Thomas Lancashire (ENG)	3:43.58	
9	1	James Thie (WAL)	3:44.25	
10	10	Adrian Blincoe (NZL)	3:44.47	
11	8	Mitchell Kealey (AUS)	3:44.57	
12	3	Alastair Hay (SCO)	3:44.61	
