= Athletics at the 2010 Commonwealth Games – Men's marathon =

Men's marathon at the Commonwealth Games

The men's marathon at the 2010 Commonwealth Games was held as part of the athletics programme at the Jawaharlal Nehru Stadium on Thursday 14 October 2010.

== Records ==
World Record	2:03:59	Haile Gebrselassie	Ethiopia	Berlin, Germany	28 September 2008
Games Record	2:09:12	Ian Thompson	England	Christchurch, New Zealand	1974

== Results ==
Rank	Athlete	Time	Notes
1st place, gold medalist(s)	John Kelai (KEN)	2:14:35	
2nd place, silver medalist(s)	Michael Shelley (AUS)	2:15:28	
3rd place, bronze medalist(s)	Amos Tirop Matui (KEN)	2:15:58	
4	Mike Tebulo (MAW)	2:18:31	
5	Samson Ramadhani Nyonyi (TAN)	2:19:31	
6	Martin Dent (AUS)	2:20:19	
7	Reinhold Iita (NAM)	2:20:40	
8	Ram Singh Yadav (IND)	2:21:24	
9	Bining Lyngkhoi (IND)	2:23:01	
10	Shamba Gitimi Gidahech (TAN)	2:24:30	
11	Ben Moreau (ENG)	2:24:34	
12	Gervais Nizeyimana (RWA)	2:24:58	
13	Jeffrey Hunt (AUS)	2:25:03	
14	Martin Williams (SCO)	2:25:46	
15	Rachid Safari (RWA)	2:30:02	
16	Pamenos Ballantyne (SVG)	2:30:29	
17	Siphesihle Mdluli (SWZ)	2:30:29	
18	Thloriso Limo (LES)	2:43:07	
-	Sechaba Albert Bohosi (LES)	DNF	
-	Dieudonné Disi (RWA)	DNF	
-	Andi Jones (ENG)	DNF	
-	Patrick Nyangero Lusatu (TAN)	DNF	
-	Tiisetso Ramokheseng (LES)	DNF	
-	Luke Kibet Bowen (KEN)	DNS	
