= Athletics at the 2010 Commonwealth Games – Men's 10,000 metres =

Men's 10,000 metres at the Commonwealth Games

The Men's 10000 metres at the 2010 Commonwealth Games as part of the athletics programme was held at the Jawaharlal Nehru Stadium on Monday 11 October 2010.

There was just a final held.

== Records ==
World Record	26:17.53	Kenenisa Bekele	ETH	Brussels, Belgium	26 September 2005
Games Record	27:45.39	Wilberforce Talel	KEN	Manchester, England	2002

== Final ==
Rank	Name	Result	Notes
1st place, gold medalist(s)	Moses Kipsiro (UGA)	27:57.39	
2nd place, silver medalist(s)	Daniel Salel (KEN)	27:57.57	
3rd place, bronze medalist(s)	Joseph Birech (KEN)	27:58.58	PB
4	Titus Mbishei (KEN)	28:03.10	
5	Marco Joseph (TAN)	28:46.83	
6	Eric Sebahire (RWA)	28:47.33	PB
7	Ben St Lawrence (AUS)	28:49.47	
8	Chris Thompson (ENG)	28:50.47	
9	Collis Birmingham (AUS)	29:35.65	
10	Andy Vernon (ENG)	29:44.91	
11	Suresh Kumar (IND)	29:49.74	
12	Jean Simuceka (RWA)	29:59.73	
13	Ramolefi Motsieloa (LES)	30:17.82	
14	Lee Merrien (GUE)	30:18.59	
15	John Beattie (ENG)	31:01.67	
–	Sunil Kumar (IND)		DNF
