= Athletics at the 2010 Commonwealth Games – Women's marathon =

Women's marathon at the Commonwealth Games

The Women's Marathon at the 2010 Commonwealth Games as part of the athletics programme was held at the Jawaharlal Nehru Stadium on Thursday 14 October 2010.

== Results ==
Rank	Athlete	Nationality	Time	Notes
1st place, gold medalist(s)	Irene Kosgei	Kenya	2:34:32	
2nd place, silver medalist(s)	Irene Mogake	Kenya	2:34:43	
3rd place, bronze medalist(s)	Lisa Weightman	Australia	2:35:25	
4	Beata Naigambo	Namibia	2:36:43	
5	Rose Nyangacha	Kenya	2:37:39	
6	Michelle Ross-Cope	England	2:46:13	
7	Epiphanie Nyirabarame	Rwanda	2:48:24	
8	Helen Decker	England	2:49:24	
9	Holly Rush	England	2:49:24	
10	Restituta Joseph	Tanzania	2:57:36	
11	Preethi Lakshmi	India	3:08:14	
12	Mamohau Tene	Lesotho	3:11:36	
13	Winile Mnisi	Swaziland	3:18:32	
14	Lineo Lebotha	Lesotho	3:24:33	
15	Refiloe Khechane	Lesotho	3:24:35	
–	Lisa Flint	Australia		DNF
