= Birech =

Masculine given name of Kenyan origin

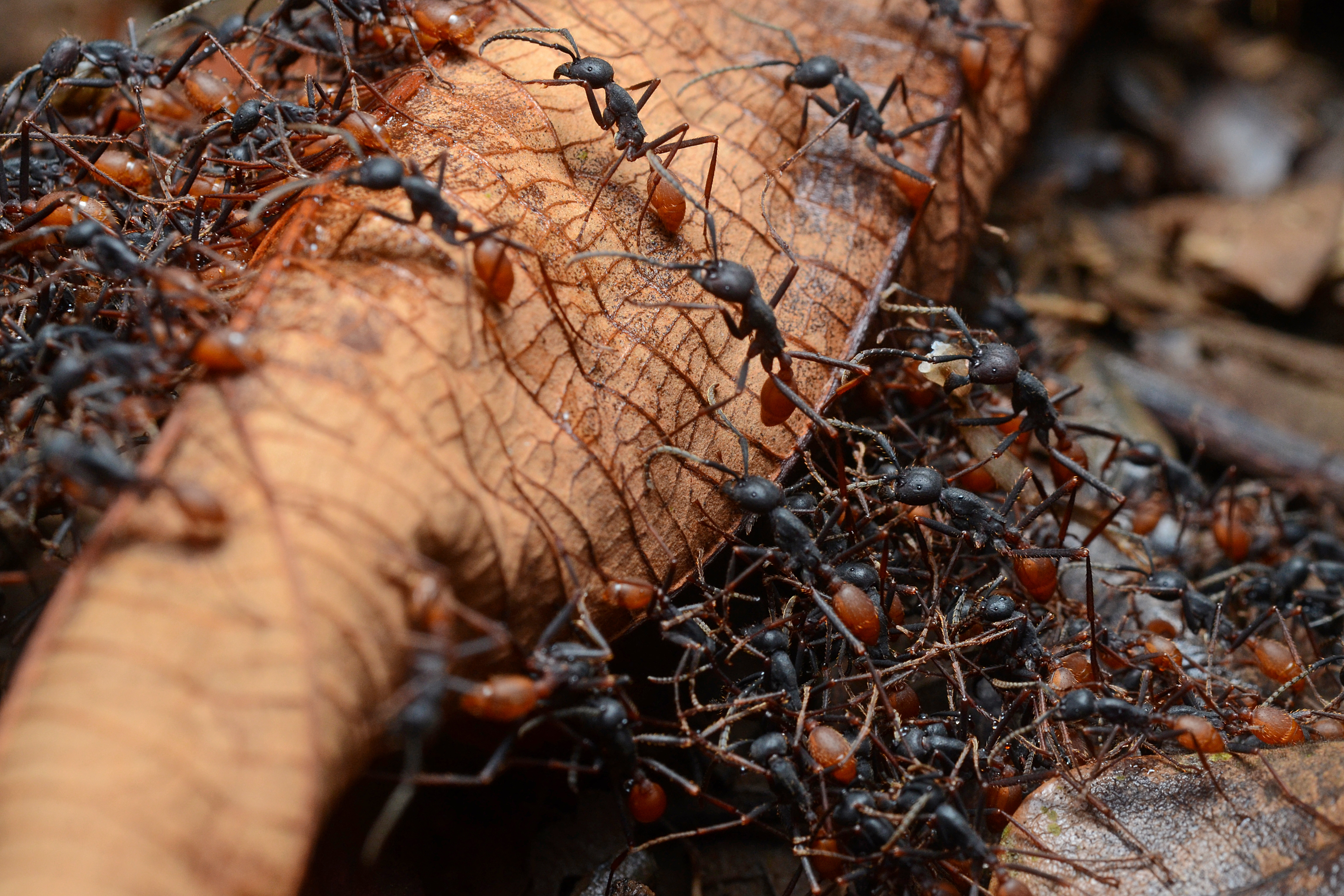
Birechik (army ants)

Birech is a masculine given name of Kenyan origin. It derives from the word birechik, which means army ants in Kalenjin.

Notable people with the surname "Birech" include:

- Jairus Birech (1992–2025), Kenyan steeplechase runner
- Joseph Birech (born 1984), Kenyan long-distance runner and two-time winner of the Great Scottish Run
