= Tina Brown (runner) =

British female former distance runner

Personal information
- Nationality: British (English)
- Born: 22 August 1976 (age 49)

Sport
- Sport: Athletics
- Event: steeplechase
- Club: Coventry Godiva Harriers

Achievements and titles
- Personal bests: 800 m: 2:07.63 (2004); 1500 m: 4:16.42 (2004); Mile run: 4:43.77 (2004); 3000 m: 9:10.54 (2006); 5000 m: 15:58.68 (2009); 2000 m steeplechase: 6:40.47 (2006); 3000 m steeplechase: 9:48.08 (2010)

Tina Brown (born 22 August 1976) is a British female former distance runner who competed mostly in the 3000 metres steeplechase and the 1500 metres.

== Biography ==
A member of Coventry Godiva Harriers, Brown became the British 3,000 metres steeplechase champion after winning the British AAA Championships title at the 2004 AAA Championships. It was the first ever national women's race over the 3000 m distance. The following year Brown retained the title ahead of her rival Jo Ankier at the 2005 AAA Championships. She was nationally prominent during the period when the women's steeplechase event gained championship level status, and she set a British record of 9:48.57 minutes in 2005 (beaten a year later by Lizzie Hall).

She twice represented England in the steeplechase at the Commonwealth Games. She represented the England team at the 2006 Commonwealth Games in Melbourne, but was hampered by an achilles injury and four years later went to the 2010 Commonwealth Games in Delhi.

She also ranked highly at national level in the 3000 metres flat, with her best finish being runner-up to Lisa Dobriskey at the 2006 AAA Indoor Championships.

== National titles ==
- AAA Championships
  - Steeplechase: 2004, 2005

== International competitions ==
| Year | Competition | Venue | Position | Event | Notes |
|---|---|---|---|---|---|
| 2006 | Commonwealth Games | Melbourne, Australia | 8th | 3000 m s'chase | 10:09.14 |
| 2010 | Commonwealth Games | New Delhi, India | 7th | 3000 m s'chase | 10:13.34 |
