= Athletics at the 2010 Commonwealth Games – Women's 800 metres =

Women's 800 metres at the Commonwealth Games

The Women's 800 metres at the 2010 Commonwealth Games as part of the athletics programme was held at the Jawaharlal Nehru Stadium on Sunday 10 October and Monday 11 October 2010.

== Records ==
World Record	1:53.28	Jarmila Kratochvílová	CZE	München, Germany	26 July 1983
Games Record	1:57.35	Maria Mutola	MOZ	Manchester, England	2002

== Round 1 ==
First 2 in each heat (Q) and 2 best performers (q) advance to the Final.

=== Heat 1 ===
Rank	Lane	Name	Result	Notes
1	7	Winny Chebet (KEN)	2:02.58	Q
2	4	Hannah England (ENG)	2:02.63	Q
3	3	Nikki Hamblin (NZL)	2:02.82	q
4	6	Kelly McNeice (NIR)	2:04.72	
5	8	Marie Lascar (MRI)	2:06.25	SB
6	5	Helen Hadjam (GUE)	2:15.08	

=== Heat 2 ===
Rank	Lane	Name	Result	Notes
1	4	Emma Jackson (ENG)	2:01.63	Q
2	6	Nancy Langat (KEN)	2:01.82	Q
3	3	Diane Cummins (CAN)	2:02.25	q
4	7	Sinimole Paulose (IND)	2:03.44	SB
–	5	Leonor Piuza (MOZ)		DNF

=== Heat 3 ===
Rank	Lane	Name	Result	Notes
1	4	Tintu Luka (IND)	2:02.73	Q
2	3	Cherono Koech (KEN)	2:03.45	Q
3	6	Salome Dell (PNG)	2:03.53	PB
4	7	Annet Negesa (UGA)	2:03.69	
5	2	Claire Gibson (SCO)	2:05.03	
6	5	Mahriam Kamara (SLE)	2:31.24	

== Final ==
Rank	Lane	Name	Result	Notes
1st place, gold medalist(s)	5	Nancy Langat (KEN)	2:00.01	
2nd place, silver medalist(s)	4	Nikki Hamblin (NZL)	2:00.05	
3rd place, bronze medalist(s)	8	Diane Cummins (CAN)	2:00.13	
4	7	Emma Jackson (ENG)	2:00.46	PB
5	2	Hannah England (ENG)	2:00.47	SB
6	6	Tintu Luka (IND)	2:01.25	
7	3	Winny Chebet (KEN)	2:11.58	
	9	Cherono Koech (KEN)	DSQ	R 163.3
