= Athletics at the 2010 Commonwealth Games – Men's 5000 metres =

Men's 5000 metres at the Commonwealth Games

The Men's 5000 metres event took place on 6 October 2010 at the Jawaharlal Nehru Stadium.

== Final ==
Rank	Lane	Name	Nationality	Time	Notes
1st place, gold medalist(s)	2	Moses Kipsiro	Uganda	13:31.25	
2nd place, silver medalist(s)	7	Eliud Kipchoge	Kenya	13:31.32	
3rd place, bronze medalist(s)	1	Mark Kiptoo	Kenya	13:32.58	
4	14	Kipsegechi Yator	Kenya	13:37.02	
5	17	Chris Thompson	England	13:39.28	
6	11	Collis Birmingham	Australia	13:39.59	
7	9	Ben St Lawrence	Australia	13:46.90	
8	20	David McNeill	Australia	13:47.40	
9	16	Tony Wamulwa	Zambia	13:48.50	SB
10	23	Eric Sebahire	Rwanda	13:55.54	PB
11	6	Adrian Blincoe	New Zealand	14:03.07	
12	5	Damiano Chopa	Tanzania	14:10.43	SB
13	18	Sylvain Rukundo	Rwanda	14:14.85	
14	10	Sunil Kumar	India	14:18.99	
15	21	Lee Merrien	Guernsey	14:19.33	
16	15	Sandip Kumar	India	14:22.59	PB
17	4	Ramolefi Motsieloa	Lesotho	14:23.19	
18	13	Cleveland Forde	Guyana	14:29.46	
19	8	Lee Emanuel	England	14:31.38	
20	19	Jean Simuceka	Rwanda	14:34.51	
21	3	Sapolai Yao	Papua New Guinea	16:21.88	
22	12	Philip Nausien	Vanuatu	16:37.30	
–	4	Abraham Kiplimo	Uganda		DNS
–	22	Chauncy Master	Malawi		DNS
