= Amos Tirop Matui =

Kenyan long-distance runner

Medal record

Men's athletics

Representing Kenya

Commonwealth Games
| Bronze medal – third place | 2010 Delhi | Marathon |

Amos Tirop Matui (born 27 May 1976) is a Kenyan professional long-distance and marathon runner. He has won marathons on four continents with career highlights including consecutive wins and course records at the Singapore Marathon, a win at the Country Music Marathon in 2009, and a bronze medal for Kenya over the distance at the 2010 Commonwealth Games.

His official personal best for the marathon is 2:12:14, although he also has an unratified time of 2:10:32 from the 2006 Ottawa Marathon. which was annulled due to misdirection on the course.

== Career ==
He scored his first victory in the marathon in 2003 by taking the title at the Baden Marathon in a time of 2:17:59. He improved his personal best time to 2:12:14 with a fourth-place finish at the 2004 Brussels Marathon and then finished second at the Hannover Marathon later that year. He also ran at the Hamburg Half Marathon, which he won in a time of 1:05:26. In 2005 he won both the Casablanca Marathon and the Singapore Marathon. In Singapore he won the race by overtaking Ashebir Demissu in the last 200 m and earned a $25,000 bonus with a course record performance of 2:15:57 in hot, humid conditions.

He entered the 2006 National Capital Marathon in Ottawa and seemingly took victory by crossing the line first in a time of 2:10:32. However, a mistake had occurred on the course as a motorist had moved a barrier while race volunteers were absent from their post. This resulted in Matui and thirteen others cutting some 400 metres off the course distance. His result was annulled but race organisers issued him financial compensation for the mistake in lieu of prize money. His season had a high note at the Singapore Marathon as he successfully defended his title. Taking on Ashebir Demissu for a second time, Matui took the lead at 41 km to improve his course record to 2:15:01 and he also became the first athlete to take successive victories at the race.

He ran at both the Ottawa and Singapore marathons again in 2007, but failed to match his form of the previous year. He finished in seventh in Canada and was second in Singapore. He appeared set to win and break the course record in Singapore for a third time but Elijah Mbogo, who was employed for pacemaking duties, decided to keep going after 30 km. Realising the 19-year-old's intentions, Matui tried to keep up with Mbogo but the gap was too much to make up. He ended up in the runner-up spot with a time of 2:14:25, while Mbogo took his course record just two seconds ahead of him.

Matui reached the Singapore podium for a fourth consecutive time in 2008, taking third place in a time of 2:15:15, although this was two minutes behind the reigning world champion Luke Kibet, who won the race. He ran in the United States for the first time in 2009 and went on to win at the Country Music Marathon in Nashville, Tennessee, running a time of 2:13:41. He was selected for the Kenyan team in the marathon at the 2010 Commonwealth Games, gaining his first international selection for Kenya at the age of 34. He felt ill in his race preparations beforehand but managed to reach the Commonwealth podium. Among the leading pack for much of the race, he slowed in the final kilometres and finished in third place to take the bronze medal while John Kelai took the title for Kenya. Reflecting upon his performance, he said: "I had been feeling unwell in the build-up to the race, so in the end I am happy with a bronze."

== Personal life ==
Matui is a member of the Seventh-day Adventist Church. Matui along with fellow Seventh-day Adventists Priscah Jeptoo and Abel Kirui founded Better Living Marathon.
