= Athletics at the 2006 Commonwealth Games – Women's 5000 metres =

Women's 5000 metres at the Commonwealth Games

The women's 5000 metres event at the 2006 Commonwealth Games was held on March 24.

== Results ==
Rank	Name	Nationality	Time	Notes
1st place, gold medalist(s)	Isabella Ochichi	Kenya	14:57.84	
2nd place, silver medalist(s)	Joanne Pavey	England	14:59.08	
3rd place, bronze medalist(s)	Lucy Wangui Kabuu	Kenya	15:00.20	
4	Eloise Wellings	Australia	15:00.69	PB
5	Sarah Jamieson	Australia	15:02.90	PB
6	Ines Chenonge	Kenya	15:12.34	
7	Courtney Babcock	Canada	15:44.22	
8	Zakia Mrisho	Tanzania	15:50.87	
9	Natalie Harvey	England	15:51.94	
10	Lucia Chandamale	Malawi	17:10.46	
	Kathy Butler	Scotland	DNS	
