= Metkei =

Place in Kenya

Coordinates: 0°10′N 35°37′E

Location of Metkei in Kenya

Metkei is a county assembly ward in Elgeyo Marakwet County, Kenya. Metkei has a population of 12945 (2011) contained in these villages: Kapchorua, Kamwosor, Kombatich, Kimamet, Cheboge, Kiptengwer, Kipsaos, Kabirirsus, and Tugumoi. Steeplechase runner Jeruto Kiptum was born here.
