= Athletics at the 2010 Commonwealth Games – Women's 10,000 metres =

Women's 10,000 metres at the Commonwealth Games

The Women's 10000 metres at the 2010 Commonwealth Games as part of the athletics programme was held at the Jawaharlal Nehru Stadium on Friday 8 October 2010.

There was just a final held.

== Records ==
World Record	29:31.78	Junxia Wang	CHN	Beijing, China	8 September 1993
Games Record	31:27.83	Salina Kosgei	KEN	Manchester, England	2002

== Final ==
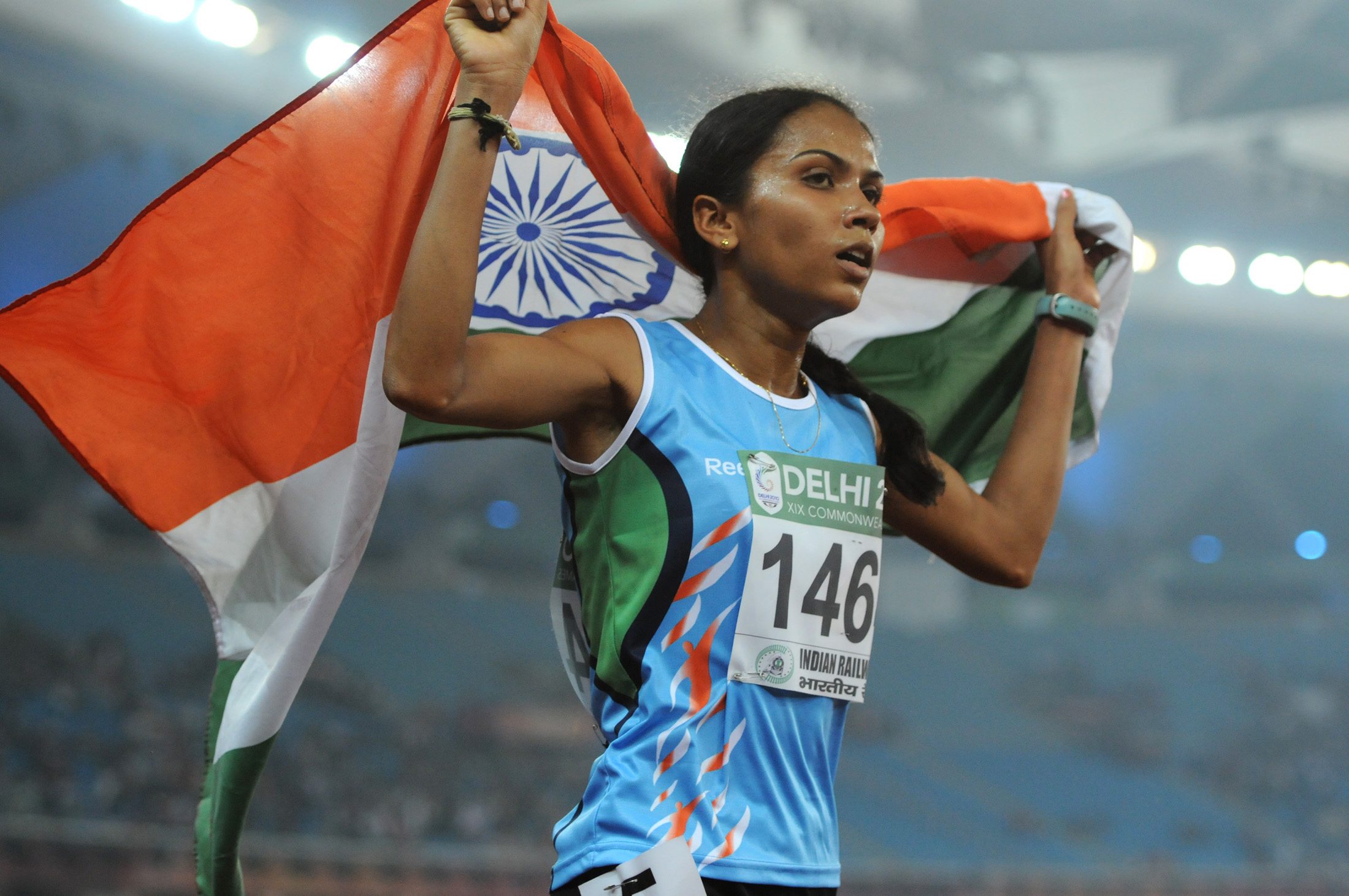
XIX Commonwealth Games-2010 Delhi (Women's) Athletics 10000m Final, Kavita Raut of India won the silver medal, at Jawaharlal Nehru Stadium, in New Delhi on 8 October 2010

Rank	Lane	Name	Result	Notes
1st place, gold medalist(s)	6	Grace Momanyi (KEN)	32:34.11	
2nd place, silver medalist(s)	8	Doris Changeywo (KEN)	32:36.97	
3rd place, bronze medalist(s)	5	Kavita Raut (IND)	33:05.28	
4	3	Charlotte Purdue (ENG)	33:13.02	
5	1	Freya Murray (SCO)	33:24.59	
6	4	Eloise Wellings (AUS)	33:36.76	
7	2	Preeja Sreedharan (IND)	33:43.91	
8	7	Lalita Babar (IND)	35:03.49	
