= Rwanda at the 2026 Commonwealth Games =

- Flag of Rwanda
- CG code: RWA
- CGA: Rwanda National Olympic and Sports Committee
- Website: olympicrwanda.org

in Glasgow, Scotland 23 July 2026 – 2 August 2026
- Competitors: 10 in 3 sports
- Flag bearer: Jayden Ntwali
- Baton bearer: Axela Echessah
- Medals Ranked =36th: Gold 0 Silver 0 Bronze 1 Total 1

Commonwealth Games appearances (overview)
- 2010; 2014; 2018; 2022; 2026; 2030

Rwanda competed at the 2026 Commonwealth Games in Glasgow, Scotland. This marked Rwanda's fifth participation at the games, after making its debut at the 2010 Commonwealth Games.

The King's Baton relay stopped in Rwanda in October 2025. The Rwandan team competed in three sports. The Rwandan team consisted of ten athletes competing in three sports (three men and seven women).

Swimmer Jayden Ntwali was the country's flagbearer, and fellow swimmer Axela Echessah the baton bearer, during the opening ceremony.

Florence Niyonkuru won bronze in the 10,000 meter final, Rwanda's first ever Commonwealth Games medal.

== Competitors ==
The following is the list of number of competitors participating at the Games per sport/discipline.

Sport		Men	Women	Total
Athletics	Athletics	0	5	5
Athletics	Para-athletics	0	1	1
Judo		1	0	1
Swimming		2	1	3
Total		3	7	10

== Medallist ==
The following Rwandan competitor a won medal at the games. In the by discipline sections below, medallists' names are bolded.

Medal	Name	Sport	Event	Date	Ref.
Bronze	Florence Niyonkuru	Athletics	Women's 10,000 metres	27 July	

== Athletics ==
Rwanda named the following track and field athletes for the 2026 Games:

Track events

Athlete	Event	Heat		Semifinal		Final	
Athlete	Event	Result	Rank	Result	Rank	Result	Rank
Magnifique Umutesiwase	Women's 100 m	11.97	4	Did not advance			
Magnifique Umutesiwase	Women's 200 m	23.95 **NR**	4	Did not advance			
Honorine Iribagiza	Women's 800 m	2:05.36 **PB**	5	Did not advance			
Claire Uwitonze	Women's 800 m	2:06.95 **SB**	6	Did not advance			
Emeline Imanizabayo	Women's 5000 m	—N/a				14:59.92 **NR**	9
**Florence Niyonkuru**	Women's 10,000 m	—N/a				31:55.47	3rd place, bronze medalist(s)

=== Para athletics ===
Athlete	Event	Final	
Athlete	Event	Result	Rank
Clementine Uwiduhaye	Women's 100 m (T47)	13.85 **PB**	8

== Judo ==
Rwanda entered one male judoka.

Athlete	Event	Round of 16	Quarterfinals	Semifinals	Repechage	Final / BM	
Athlete	Event	Opposition Result	Opposition Result	Opposition Result	Opposition Result	Opposition Result	Rank
Alban Bouvet	Men's 60 kg	Katz (AUS); **L** 000–101	Did not advance				

== Swimming ==
Rwanda entered three swimmers, two men and one woman.

Athlete	Event	Heat		Semifinal		Final	
Athlete	Event	Time	Rank	Time	Rank	Time	Rank
Jayden Ntwali	Men's 50 m freestyle	27.41	60	Did not advance			
Jayden Ntwali	Men's 100 m freestyle	1:01.09	61	Did not advance			
Jayden Ntwali	Men's 50 m backstroke	31.74	36	Did not advance			
Jayden Ntwali	Men's 100 m backstroke	1:12.83	29	Did not advance			
Jayden Ntwali	Men's 50 m butterfly	29.12	63	Did not advance			
Kean Murenzi Sheja	Men's 50 m freestyle	26.97	59	Did not advance			
Kean Murenzi Sheja	Men's 100 m freestyle	58.54	58	Did not advance			
Kean Murenzi Sheja	Men's 200 m freestyle	2:11.02	38	—N/a		Did not advance	
Kean Murenzi Sheja	Men's 50 m butterfly	28.74	62	Did not advance			
Axela Marita Echessah	Women's 50 m freestyle	30.31	62	Did not advance			
Axela Marita Echessah	Women's 100 m freestyle	1:08.31	62	Did not advance			
Axela Marita Echessah	Women's 50 m breaststroke	41.38	28	Did not advance			
Axela Marita Echessah	Women's 50 m butterfly	32.64	50	Did not advance			
