= Jeruto Kiptum =

Kenyan middle-distance runner

Medal record

Women's athletics

Representing Kenya

World Championships
Bronze medal – third place	2005 Helsinki	3000 m st.

African Championships
Gold medal – first place	2006 Bambous	3000 m st.
Bronze medal – third place	2004 Brazzaville	1500 m

Jeruto Kiptum Kiptubi (born 12 December 1981) is a Kenyan middle-distance runner who specializes in the 3000 metres steeplechase.

She was born in 1981 in Metkei, Keiyo District. She studied at the Singore Girls Secondary School in Iten, like many other Kenyan women runners.

== International competitions ==
Year	Competition	Venue	Position	Event	Notes
Representing Kenya
2000	World Junior Championships	Santiago, Chile	7th	800 m	2:08.97
2004	African Championships	Brazzaville, Republic of the Congo	3rd	1500 m	4:25.85
2005	World Championships	Helsinki, Finland	3rd	3000 m s'chase	9:26.95
2006	Commonwealth Games	Melbourne, Australia	6th	3000 m s'chase	9:49.09
2006	African Championships	Bambous, Mauritius	1st	3000 m s'chase	10:00.02
2006	World Athletics Final	Stuttgart, Germany	2nd	3000 m s'chase	9:28.60

== Personal bests ==
- 800 metres - 2:04.00 min (2000)
- 1500 metres - 4:08.6 min (2000)
- 3000 metres - 9:01.90 min (1999)
- 3000 metres steeplechase - 9:23.35 min (2006)
