= Athletics at the 2006 Commonwealth Games – Women's 3000 metres steeplechase =

Women's 3000 metres steeplechase at the Commonwealth Games

The women's 3000 metres steeplechase event at the 2006 Commonwealth Games was held on March 22.

== Results ==
| Rank | Name | Nationality | Time | Notes |
|---|---|---|---|---|
| 1st place, gold medalist(s) | Dorcus Inzikuru | Uganda | 9:19.51 | |
| 2nd place, silver medalist(s) | Melissa Rollison | Australia | 9:24.29 | PB |
| 3rd place, bronze medalist(s) | Donna MacFarlane | Australia | 9:25.05 | PB |
| 4 | Victoria Mitchell | Australia | 9:34.24 | PB |
| 5 | Kate McIlroy | New Zealand | 9:35.70 | PB |
| 6 | Jeruto Kiptum | Kenya | 9:49.09 | PB |
| 7 | Joanna Ankier | England | 9:53.12 | |
| 8 | Tina Brown | England | 10:09.14 | |
| 9 | Mardrea Hyman | Jamaica | 10:09.74 | |
| 10 | Tebogo Masehla | South Africa | 10:11.64 | |
| 11 | Jackline Chemwek | Kenya | 10:15.65 | PB |
| 12 | Esther Tuwei | Kenya | 10:24.09 | |
| 13 | Nolene Conrad | South Africa | 10:26.84 | |
| 14 | Rebecca Forlong | New Zealand | 10:36.08 | |
| | Korene Hinds | Jamaica | DNS | |
