= Nikki Hamblin =

New Zealand middle-distance runner

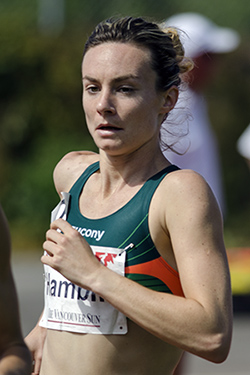

Personal information
- Born: 20 May 1988 (age 38) Dorchester, Dorset, England
- Education: Open Polytechnic of New Zealand

Sport
- Club: Cambridge Athletic & Harrier Club
Medal record
Women's Athletics
Representing New Zealand
Commonwealth Games
Silver medal – second place	2010 Delhi	800 m
Silver medal – second place	2010 Delhi	1500 m

Nikki Jayne Hamblin (born 20 May 1988) is a New Zealand middle distance runner who specialises in the 800 and 1500 metres. Born in England, Hamblin ran for the Dorchester Athletics Club before moving to New Zealand in 2006. She gained New Zealand citizenship in 2009. In 2010, Hamblin became the New Zealand record holder in the 1500 metres and won the silver medal in both the 800 and 1500 metres at the 2010 Commonwealth Games in Delhi.

At the 2016 Summer Olympics in Rio de Janeiro, she received considerable international media attention following an incident during the 5000m heat in which both she and American Abbey D'Agostino fell. The two women helped each other finish the race and were allowed to compete in the final. As D'Agostino had suffered a torn anterior cruciate ligament and meniscus she was unable to participate further. Hamblin's injuries were less serious and she was able to compete in the final but finished last. Both athletes were praised for their sportsmanship and "Olympic spirit", and were subsequently awarded the Rio 2016 Fair Play Award by the International Fair Play Committee.

== Personal bests ==
Event	Time	Date	Location
800 metres	1:59.66	4 September 2010	Split, Croatia
1500 metres	4:04.82 NR	22 July 2011	Barcelona, Spain
Mile	4:31.16	22 July 2016	Dublin, Ireland
3000 metres	8:51.48	14 June 2014	New York City, United States
5000 metres	15:18.02	2 May 2015	Palo Alto, California

== International competitions ==
Year	Competition	Venue	Position	Event	Notes
2010	Commonwealth Games	Delhi, India	2nd	800 m	2:00.05
2010	Commonwealth Games	Delhi, India	2nd	1500 m	4:05.97
2014	Commonwealth Games	Glasgow, Scotland	7th	800 m	2:02.43
2014	Commonwealth Games	Glasgow, Scotland	5th	1500 m	4:10.77
2015	World Championships	Beijing, China	31st (h)	1500 m	4:16.65
2016	Olympic Games	Rio de Janeiro, Brazil	30th (h)	1500 m	4:11.88
2016	Olympic Games	Rio de Janeiro, Brazil	17th	5000 m	16:14.24
