= Athletics at the 2010 Commonwealth Games – Women's 5000 metres =

Women's 5000 metres at the Commonwealth Games

The Women's 5000 metres event at the 2010 Commonwealth Games took place on 12 October 2010 at the Jawaharlal Nehru Stadium.

== Final ==
Rank	Lane	Name	Nationality	Time	Notes
1st place, gold medalist(s)	5	Vivian Cheruiyot	Kenya	15:55.12	
2nd place, silver medalist(s)	11	Sylvia Kibet	Kenya	15:55.61	
3rd place, bronze medalist(s)	8	Ines Chenonge	Kenya	16:02.47	
4	9	Stephanie Twell	Scotland	16:03.91	
5	1	Eloise Welling	Australia	16:11.97	
6	4	Charlotte Purdue	England	16:16.13	
7	6	Freya Murray	Scotland	16:26.22	
8	2	Megan Wright	Canada	16:55.86	
9	3	Jacqueline Murekatete	Rwanda	17:15.44	
–	7	Lalita Babar	India		DNS
–	10	Jhuma Khatun	India		DNS
