= Athletics at the 2010 Commonwealth Games – Women's 3000 metres steeplechase =

Women's 3000 metres steeplechase at the Commonwealth Games

The Women's 3000 metres steeplechase at the 2010 Commonwealth Games as part of the athletics programme was held at the Jawaharlal Nehru Stadium on Saturday 9 October 2010.

== Records ==
World Record	8:58.81	Gulnara Samitova-Galkina	RUS	Beijing, China	17 August 2008
Games Record	9:19.51	Dorcus Inzikuru	UGA	Melbourne, Australia	22 March 2006

== Results ==
Rank	Athlete	Time	Notes
1st place, gold medalist(s)	Milcah Chemos Cheywa (KEN)	9:40.96	
2nd place, silver medalist(s)	Mercy Wanjiru Njoroge (KEN)	9:41.54	
3rd place, bronze medalist(s)	Gladys Jerotich Kipkemoi (KEN)	9:52.51	
4	Helen Clitheroe (ENG)	9:56.37	
5	Sudha Singh (IND)	9:57.63	PB
6	Lennie Waite (SCO)	10:02.12	
7	Tina Brown (ENG)	10:13.34	
8	Jaisha Orchatteri Puthita Veetil (IND)	10:20.83	
9	Priyanka Singh Patel (IND)	10:26.48	
