= Baringo Half Marathon =

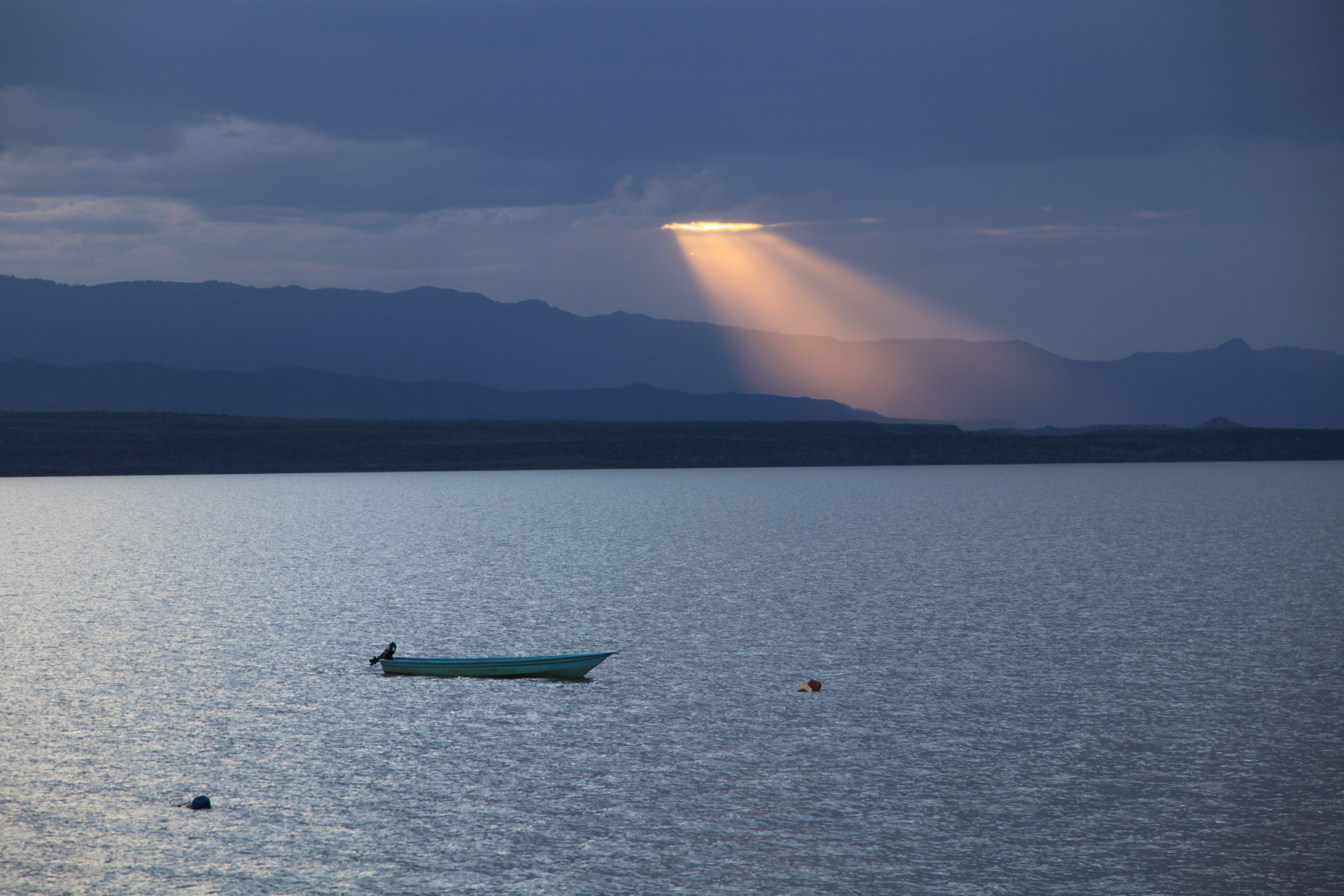
- The race takes place near Kenya's Lake Baringo
- Date: December
- Location: Baringo, Kenya
- Event type: Road
- Distance: Half marathon
- Established: 2001

The Baringo Half Marathon is an annual road running competition for men and women over the half marathon distance which takes place every December in Baringo, Kenya. The programme previously had a 15 kilometres race for women, but this was extended to a half marathon in 2011.

The race was established in 2001 by Paul Tergat, a former marathon world record holder, who was born in the local area. Tergat hoped that the race would unearth and nurture high quality runners in the area. It tends to attract around 500 (mostly Kenyan) runners, among them a number of world-class road racing athletes.

The course of the road race features many curves and multiple uphill and downhill sections. Mubarak Hassan Shami became the first runner to defend the title, and Agnes Kiprop became the first woman to win the competition twice consecutively. The race received greater commercial support in 2009, attracting sponsorship deals with Safaricom and the National Social Security Fund. Around 300 runners took part in the 2010 men's half marathon race.

The men's event was changed to a 20 kilometres road race in 2006 and 2007, but it returned to its original half marathon format in 2008 with the 20 km races not considered to be within the editions of the race.

== Past winners ==
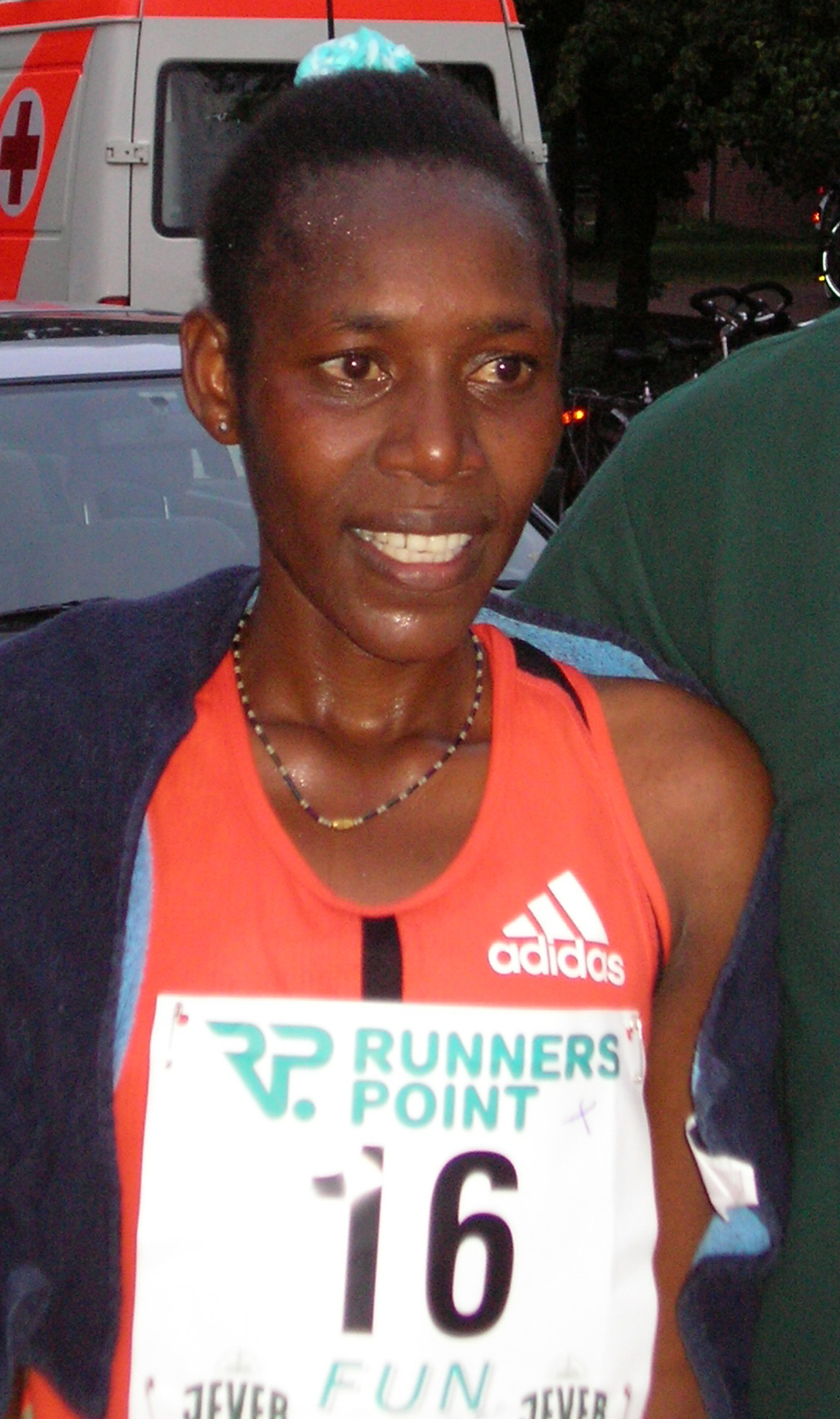
The 2007 women's winner, Peninah Arusei

Key: 20 km men's course 10 km women's course 15K women's course

Edition	Year	Men's half marathon winner	Time (h:m:s)	Women's 15 km winner	Time (h:m:s)
1st	2001	?	?	?	?
2nd	2002	Yusuf Songoka (KEN)	1:00:54	Irene Kosgei (KEN)	54:07
–	2003	Did not held			
3rd	2004	James Yatich (KEN)	?	?	?
4th	2005	Mubarak Hassan Shami (QAT)	1:01.57	Irene Kosgei (KEN)	52:49
5th	2006	Mubarak Hassan Shami (QAT)	1:06.55	Caroline Kiptoo (KEN)	41:25.23
6th	2006	David Murkomen (KEN)	57:28	Joan Aiyabei (KEN)	50:08
7th	2007	Moses Kigen (KEN)	56:14	Peninah Arusei (KEN)	50:52
8th	2008	Vincent Loritam (KEN)	1:02:06.4	Agnes Kiprop (KEN)	50:55
9th	2009	Eric Ndiema (KEN)	1:02:13.8	Agnes Kiprop (KEN)	51:08.6
10th	2010	Robert Kipkorir (KEN)	1:02:25	Joyce Chepkirui (KEN)	50:25.9
11th	2011	Solomon Kiptoo (KEN)	1:02:23.1	Joyce Chepkirui (KEN)	1:10:57.1
12th	2012	Hosea Nailel (KEN)	1:02:32.5	Flomena Cheyech (KEN)	1:01:15.3
13th	2013	Kenneth Kimeng'wa (KEN)	1:03:52	Agnes Kiprop (KEN)	1:13:43
14th	2014	Josephat Kiprop (KEN)	1:01:24	Cynthia Limo (KEN)	1:10:06
–	2015	Did not held, only 10km race held.			
15th	2016	Isaac Langat (KEN)	1:02:51	Edith Chelimo (KEN)	1:11:02
16th	2017	Isaac Langat (KEN)	1:01:47	Lucy Cheruiyot (KEN)	1:12:19
