= 2004 African Championships in Athletics – Women's 1500 metres =

The women's 1500 metres event at the 2004 African Championships in Athletics was held in Brazzaville, Republic of the Congo on July 18.

== Results ==
| Rank | Name | Nationality | Time | Notes |
|---|---|---|---|---|
| 1st place, gold medalist(s) | Nancy Langat | Kenya | 4:24.56 | |
| 2nd place, silver medalist(s) | Saïda El Mehdi | Morocco | 4:24.87 | |
| 3rd place, bronze medalist(s) | Jeruto Kiptum | Kenya | 4:25.85 | |
| 4 | Nawal Baidi | Morocco | 4:26.01 | |
| 5 | Bouchra Chaâbi | Morocco | 4:26.35 | |
| 6 | Léontine Tsiba | Republic of the Congo | 4:28.97 | |
| 7 | Bentille Alassane | Benin | 4:56.68 | |
