= Athletics at the 2006 Commonwealth Games – Men's marathon =

Men's marathon at the Commonwealth Games

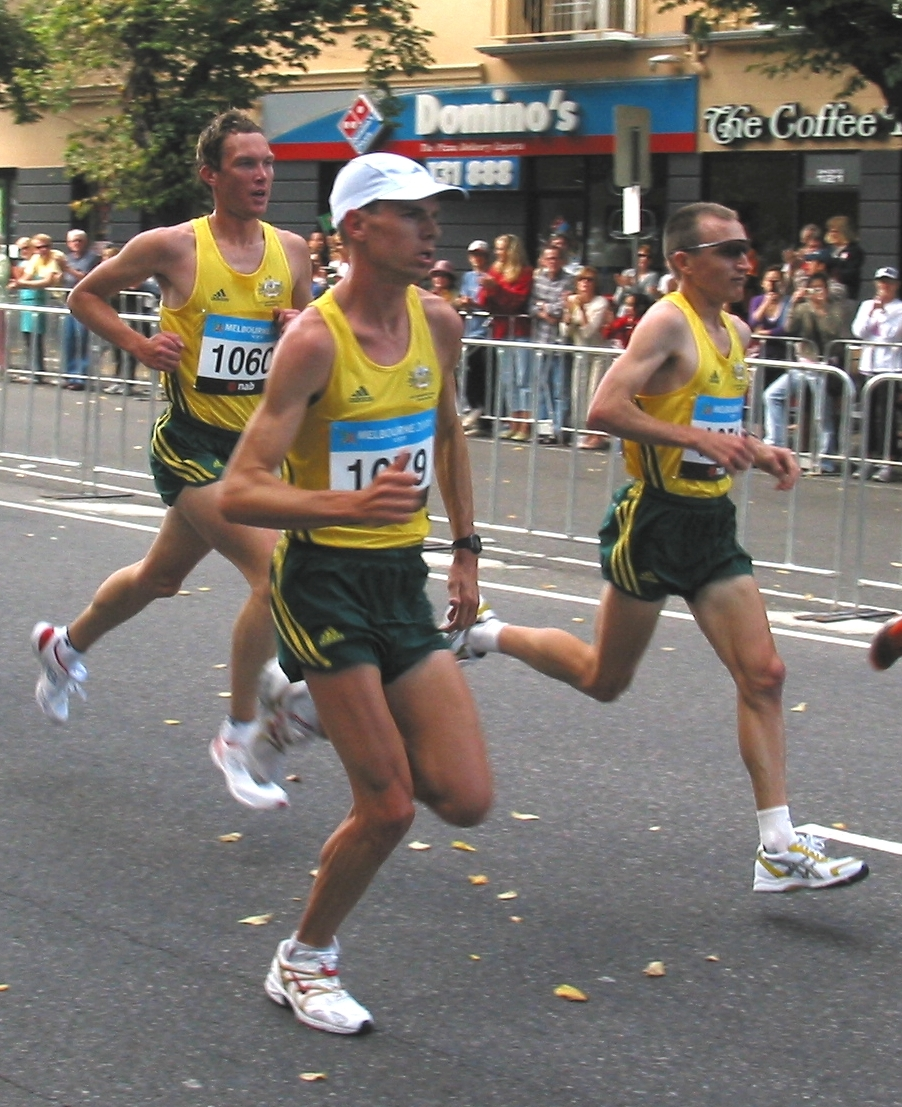
Australians Andrew Letherby (1051), Scott Westcott (1079) and Shane Nankervis (1060) during the marathon

The men's marathon event at the 2006 Commonwealth Games was held on March 19.

== Results ==
Rank	Name	Nationality	Time	Notes
1st place, gold medalist(s)	Samson Ramadhani	Tanzania	2:11:29	SB
2nd place, silver medalist(s)	Fred Tumbo	Kenya	2:12:03	PB
3rd place, bronze medalist(s)	Daniel Robinson	England	2:14:50	
4	Scott Westcott	Australia	2:16:32	
5	Andrew Letherby	Australia	2:17:11	
6	Jacob Yator	Kenya	2:17:31	
7	Shane Nankervis	Australia	2:19:15	
8	Francis Naali	Tanzania	2:19:39	
9	Lebenya Nkoka	Lesotho	2:19:40	
10	Teboho Sello	Lesotho	2:19:58	PB
11	Neo Molema	South Africa	2:29:04	
12	Mohamed Turay	Sierra Leone	2:50:19	
13	Andrew Gutzmore	Jamaica	2:51:55	
14	Errol Duncan	Saint Helena	3:11:21	
	Christopher Isengwe	Tanzania	DNF	
	Tsotang Maine	Lesotho	DNF	
	Tseko Mpolokeng	South Africa	DNF	
