= Irene Jerotich Kosgei =

Kenyan long-distance runner

Medal record

Women's athletics

Representing Kenya

Commonwealth Games
Gold medal – first place	2010 Delhi	Marathon

Irene Jerotich Kosgei^{[nb]} (born 8 September 1974) is a Kenyan long-distance runner who specialises in the marathon. Her first victory over the distance came at the Nairobi Marathon in 2006 and she won the race again in 2010 with a course record and personal best time of 2:28:47. She became the first Kenyan woman to win the Commonwealth marathon title at the 2010 Commonwealth Games in New Delhi.

Among her other achievements on the road, she won the 2005 Baringo 15K, the Tiberias Marathon in 2010 and has also finished top three at the Ottawa Marathon and Reims Marathon. She is a three-time winner of the Singapore Marathon

== Career ==
She was third at the Grand 25 Berlin in May 2004 (running a time of 1:29:23) and won the half marathon in Würzburg the following week. She then took third at the Singelloop Breda in October, and went on to compete in one of her first marathon competitions, the Reims Marathon, where she was third in a time of 2:40:25. She ran at the Baringo 15K in Kenya at the start of 2005 and won the race in 52:49. She was fourth at the Berlin Half Marathon in April, missing out on the podium spot to her compatriot Beatrice Omwanza. Jerotich entered the Nairobi Marathon for the first time in 2005 and she finished as runner-up with a new best of 2:37:52 behind Caroline Cheptanui Kilel.

Her two major races of 2006 were the Portugal Half Marathon in Lisbon in September, where she took third place, and a return trip to the Nairobi Marathon in October. In Nairobi she won her first marathon race, beating Chinese runner Zhang Xin and recording a lifetime best of 2:32:39. The next year she took part in her first top, elite level competition – the Paris Marathon. She improved her personal best further to 2:31:12 in the race, which was enough for fifth place as the top Kenyan female finisher that year. She took on the Reims Marathon again but was off her peak form and finished with a comparatively slow time of 2:37:15 for sixth place.

She attempted to regain her Nairobi title in 2008, but was soundly beaten by Emma Muthoni. Jerotich was initially given third place behind Jepkosgei Sawe, but Sawe's disqualification for taking a shortcut meant she was promoted to second place. The 2009 season saw Jerotich reach the podium at all her marathons: she ran first at the Tiberias Marathon, which she won in 2:39:07, and then at the Ottawa Marathon in May where she was the third woman to finish. She entered the Nairobi Marathon yet again and delivered her best performance of the event with a course record and personal best time of 2:28:47. This made her the first athlete to win the race on two occasions and she won the race almost two minutes ahead of runner-up Alice Chelangat.

Jerotich continued her career high into 2010, beginning with a half marathon best of 1:11:17 at the City-Pier-City Loop, which brought her second place behind Pauline Wangui. She was selected to represent Kenya in the marathon at the 2010 Commonwealth Games in New Delhi. She fell mid-race into a drinks station after clashing with another runner and had to continue the race with a bloodied knee. Her perseverance paid off as she pulled away from the race leader Irene Mogake in the final stages of the race to become the first ever Kenyan woman to take the Commonwealth marathon title. After her Commonwealth win, she ran at the Baringo 15K, but managed only fifth on this occasion. She returned to the top of the podium with a win at the Singapore Marathon in December.

She was picked for the Kenyan marathon squad at the 2011 World Championships in Athletics and came thirteenth in a time of 2:31:29 hours. She competed over ten miles in October at the Great South Run and placed third on the podium. A return to Singapore saw Jerotich take a second consecutive marathon win at the race. She won the Milan Marathon in April 2012, holding off Emma Quaglia in the final kilometres. She ran a 10K best of 32:47 minutes at the Great Manchester Run and had a third win in Singapore that year.

== Notes ==
- ^{nb} Her name may also be transliterated as Irene Cherotich and she has competed under that name in some instances.
