= Rwanda at the Commonwealth Games =

- CG code: RWA
- CGA: Rwanda National Olympic and Sports Committee
- Website: olympicrwanda.org
- Medals: Gold 0 Silver 0 Bronze 1 Total 1

Commonwealth Games appearances (overview)
- 2010; 2014; 2018; 2022; 2026; 2030

Rwanda competed in the Commonwealth Games for the first time at the 2010 Games in Delhi, India.

== Medal tally ==
Games	Gold	Silver	Bronze	Total
(India) 2010 Delhi	0	0	0	0
(Scotland) 2014 Glasgow	0	0	0	0
(Australia) 2018 Gold Coast	0	0	0	0
(England) 2022 Birmingham	0	0	0	0
(Scotland) 2026 Glasgow	0	0	1	1
Totals (5 entries)	0	0	1	1

Rwanda won their first Commonwealth medal in the 2026 games in Glasgow, a bronze in the Women's 10,000 metres athletics event.

== History ==
Rwanda joined the Commonwealth of Nations in November 2009 and gained membership to the Commonwealth Games Federation shortly afterwards.
