= Athletics at the 2002 Commonwealth Games – Men's 50 kilometres walk =

Men's 50 kilometres walk at the Commonwealth Games

The men's 50 kilometres walk event at the 2002 Commonwealth Games was held on 30 July.

== Results ==
Rank	Name	Nationality	Time	Notes
1st place, gold medalist(s)	Nathan Deakes	Australia	3:52:40	GR
2nd place, silver medalist(s)	Craig Barrett	New Zealand	3:56:42	
3rd place, bronze medalist(s)	Tim Berrett	Canada	4:04:25	
4	Duane Cousins	Australia	4:09:59	
5	Tony Sargisson	New Zealand	4:13:19	
6	Steven Hollier	England	4:16:46	
7	Gareth Brown	England	4:40:07	
	Mark Easton	England	DQ	
	Liam Murphy	Australia	DQ	
