= Irene Mogaka =

Kenyan long-distance runner

Medal record

Women's athletics

Representing Kenya

Commonwealth Games
Silver medal – second place	2010 Delhi	Marathon

Irene Mogaka Kemunto (born 10 January 1985) is a Kenyan long-distance runner who competes in the marathon.

She began running at national level around 2005 and took second at the Kisii cross country meet that year. She made her marathon debut at the Nairobi International Marathon and finished in tenth place with a time of 2:48:27. She improved her time to 2:41:12 with a fifth-place finish at the 2007 edition of the Mumbai Marathon. She was crowned the 5000 metres provincial champion for the Nyanza Province in June that year. She ran at the Rock 'n' Roll Las Vegas Marathon at the end of the year and was runner-up behind Sylvia Skvortsova, taking her best time to 2:36:15.

Her 2008 season was highlighted by a run of 2:38:22 for fifth place at the Toronto Marathon. She focused solely on the marathon in 2009 and started with a third-place finish at the Mumbai Marathon in January. She knocked six minutes of her marathon best at the Los Angeles Marathon to record 2:30:10 for fifth place. Her third marathon of the year was the Singapore Marathon but her race was slow and she finished in ninth place.

She ran at the Berlin Half Marathon at the start of 2010 and set a half marathon best of 1:11:38 and finished sixth overall. She ran the second fastest race of her career at the Vienna City Marathon in April, clocking 2:31:28 to finish as runner-up behind Hellen Kimutai. She ran for Kenya at the 2010 Commonwealth Games and was leading the race in the final stages. However, her compatriot Irene Jerotich Kosgei overtook her in the last three kilometres and Mogaka finished eleven seconds behind her to record a time of 2:34:43 and win the silver medal. She competed again in India at the Mumbai Marathon in January the following year, but managed only eighth place in the race.

She was the sole Kenyan entrant at the Osaka Women's Marathon and finished seventh overall.
