= Nancy Langat =

Kenyan middle-distance runner

Nancy Jebet Langat
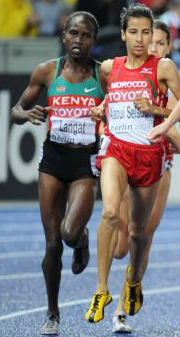
- Langat (left) at the 1500 m in Berlin in 2009, with Mariem Alaoui Selsouli

Personal information
- Born: 22 August 1981 (age 45)
- Height: 5 ft 0 in (1.52 m)
- Weight: 108 lb (49 kg)

Sport
- Country: Kenya
- Events: 800 m, 1500 m
- College team: Kenya Air Force

Achievements and titles
- Olympic finals: 2008 1500 m, 1st 2004 1500 m, 7th in semi-finals
- Personal bests: 800 m: 1:57.75; 1500 m: 4:00.23
Medal record
Women's athletics
Representing Kenya
Olympic Games
Gold medal – first place	2008 Beijing	1500 m
African Championships
Gold medal – first place	2004 Brazzaville	1500 m
Gold medal – first place	2010 Nairobi	1500 m
Commonwealth Games
Gold medal – first place	2010 Delhi	800 m
Gold medal – first place	2010 Delhi	1500 m

Nancy Jebet Langat (born 22 August 1981) is a Kenyan middle distance runner who specialises in the 1,500 metres. She won the gold medal in the 1,500 m at the 2008 Summer Olympics, in a personal best time of 4:00.23.

She also competed at the 2004 Summer Olympics and the 2005 World Championships, without reaching the finals. In her younger days, she mainly competed in the 800 metres, and was successful as a junior.

Langat's gold at the 2008 Summer Olympics in Beijing made her only the second Kenyan woman to win an Olympic gold. The first one was Pamela Jelimo, who won the 800 m at the same Olympics. At the 2009 World Championships, Langat did not advance past the semifinals, but finished the season with a win at the World Athletics Final.

In 2010 Langat won the Diamond League 1500 m. She was undefeated in all races against the best runners in the world. He performance at the 2010 IAAF Continental Cup was controversial, as she attempted to pull back Hind Dehiba as the two duelled in the final straight. Langat fell and finished last. She claimed an 800/1500 m middle distance double at the 2010 Commonwealth Games, however, and was chosen as the Kenyan Sportswoman of the Year in December.

Langat had less success on the 2011 Diamond League circuit: on her two appearances, at the Golden Gala and Prefontaine Classic, she came fifth both times. She topped the podium in the 1500 m at the 2011 Military World Games, but was eliminated in the semi-finals at the 2011 World Championships in Athletics. She suffered a knee injury in 2012 and missed the opportunity to defend her Olympic title.

== Personal life ==
Nancy Langat is married to marathon runner Kenneth Cheruiyot. Her oldest son turned six on the day that she won Olympic Gold. She was recruited by Kenya Air Force and is based at the Moi Air Base in Nairobi. Her father Joseph Langat was an international level long-distance runner.

== Achievements ==
Year	Competition	Venue	Position	Event	Notes
Representing Kenya
1996	World Junior Championships	Sydney, Australia	3rd	800 m	2:03.21
1998	World Junior Championships	Annecy, France	2nd	800 m	2:05.43
1998	Commonwealth Games	Kuala Lumpur, Malaysia	18th (h)	800 m	2:07.68
2000	World Junior Championships	Santiago, Chile	1st	800 m	2:01.51
2004	African Championships	Brazzaville, Republic of the Congo	1st	1500 m	4:24.56
2004	Olympic Games	Athens, Greece	15th (sf)	1500 m	4:07.57
2005	World Cross Country Championships	Saint-Étienne, France	8th	Short race (4.196 km)	13:31
2005	World Championships	Helsinki, Finland	24th (h)	1500 m	4:16.13
2008	African Championships	Addis Ababa, Ethiopia	4th	1500 m	4:16.19
2008	Olympic Games	Beijing, China	1st	1500 m	4:00.03
2009	World Championships	Berlin, Germany	19th (sf)	1500 m	4:11.10
2009	World Athletics Final	Thessaloniki, Greece	1st	1500 m	4:13.63
2010	African Championships	Nairobi, Kenya	1st	1500 m	4:10.43
2010	IAAF Continental Cup	Split, Croatia	8th	1500 m	4:23.93
2010	Commonwealth Games	Delhi, India	1st	800 m	2:00.01
2010	Commonwealth Games	Delhi, India	1st	1500 m	4:05.26
2011	Military World Games	Rio de Janeiro, Brazil	1st	1500 m	4:15.42
2011	World Championships	Daegu, South Korea	24th (sf)	1500 m	4:12.92
2013	World Championships	Moscow, Russia	9th	1500 m	4:06.01
