= Jo Ankier =

British athlete and television personality

Personal information
- Born: London, England
- Height: 1.7 m (5 ft 7 in)

Sport
- Club: Shaftesbury Barnet Harriers
- Retired: 2008
- Now coaching: Bryan Smith

Achievements and titles
- Personal best: 3000 Steeplechase – 9:43.88

Joanna Ankier is an English former international athlete who held three British National Records and is now a British television personality. Ankier is currently a television host for BT Sport Boxing and a reporter for Amazon Prime Video on football as well as covering four Olympic Games for ESPN and Olympic Channel News. She is also the presenter of the E1 Series electric powerboat racing, an occasional presenter of Extreme E Electric RallyCross racing and the pit-lane reporter for MotoAmerica Live Plus Superbikes.

Ankier is a former British steeplechase athlete who competed at the IAAF World Championships in 2005 and held British national records for the 1500, 2000 and 3000 metre steeplechases. Ankier is also a host on CBS Sports Serie A programming airing across America on Sundays on CBS and Paramount Plus and the live post-fight reporter and a studio host for BT Sport on their boxing fight nights for the FightNight Live programming.

== Early life and education ==
Ankier grew up in north-west London and attended the Henrietta Barnett School. She earned her Bachelor of Science degree from the University of Nottingham where she majored in physics with a minor in philosophy. Ankier then furthered her post-graduate education at King's College London where she received a sports law diploma.

Ankier is a skilled pianist and cellist. In 2016, she joined Atlanta Braves shortstop Chase Darnaud and father-son duo Clayton and Sebastian Cages to form a country rock and roll group, The Chasedarnaud band. Ankier plays acoustic and electric cello along with keyboard in the group which released their first full album "Seven Ghosts" on September 22, 2016.

== Career ==
=== Athletics ===
Ankier is a former holder of the British National records for the 1500, 2000 and 3000 metre steeplechases. She trained at the UK Athletics' Endurance Centre at St Mary's University, Twickenham, and was a member of the Shaftesbury Barnet Harriers.

In 2003, she set the British record for the women's 2000 metre steeplechase with a time of 6 minutes 48 seconds, at the Birmingham AAAs championships on 26 July. In 2004, she set the British record for the women's 1500 metre steeplechase with a time of 4 minutes 52.5 seconds, at the Bedford Inter Counties Championships on 31 May. The same year she finished second behind Tina Brown (runner) in the 3,000 metres steeplechase event at the 2004 AAA Championships.

In 2005, she set the British record for the women's 3000 metre steeplechase with a time of 9 minutes 50 seconds, at the Naimette-Xhovémont track in Liège, Belgium on 20 July. After finishing 3rd in the European Cup at Leiria in Portugal she competed in the first ever women's steeplechase at the 2005 IAAF World Championships in Helsinki where she finished 11th. She also finished second behind Tina Brown again at the 2005 AAA Championships.

Ankier represented England at the 2006 Commonwealth Games in Melbourne, finishing 7th.

She finished third at the qualifying trials for the 2008 Beijing Olympics, but the third place on the team was given to the athlete who had a faster time at a previous event.

Ankier's UK rankings include:

- 'Under 20' 2,000 metres: 2001 – Number 1.
- 'Under 23' 1,500 metres: 2002 – 3rd.
- 'Under 23' 3,000 metres indoor: 2002 – 3rd.
- 1,500 metres indoor: 2002 – 12th; 2003 – 11th; 2004 – 21st; 2005 – 8th.
- 1,500 metres steeplechase: 2004 – Number 1.
- 2,000 metres steeplechase: 2001 – 3rd; 2003 – 7th; 2004 – 3rd.
- 3,000 metres: 2005 – 9th; 2006 – 4th.
- 3,000 metres indoor: 2004 – 14th; 2005 – 6th; 2007 – 4th; 2008 – 5th.
- 3,000 metres steeplechase: 2003 – 3rd; 2004 – 2nd, 2005 – 2nd; 2006 – 3rd; 2007 – 6th; 2008 – 4th.
- 2 miles: 2007 – 3rd.
- 10,000 metres: 2005 – 15th.

She retired from top level international athletics in 2008 and competed in only 3 events in 2009. Over the course of her ten-year athletics career she competed in 134 national and international events, winning 20 of them.

=== London Olympics video ===
In 2005, Ankier was chosen by the London 2012 Olympic Committee to star in the official video for the successful London Olympic Bid. In Sport at Heart she is pictured running through the sights of London inspiring locals and celebrities to "Back the Bid" and win London the Olympic Games.

== Media ==
Ankier's media career is primarily as an investigative news and sports reporter, anchor and producer for TV channels including: ESPN, Fox Soccer Channel, The Tennis Channel, Chelsea FC, Sky Sports News, Liverpool FC, KDOC-TV, Los Angeles, Chivas USA (Major League Soccer), VICE News, TLN News and Vocative.

In 2011, Ankier hosted ESPN International's global red carpet show for the prestigious ESPY awards airing across the Europe, Caribbean and Pacific Rim regions.

In 2012, she anchored ESPN International's flagship show SportsCenter over the London 2012 Olympic Games. Her athletics background enabled her to record exclusive interviews with star athletes such as Oscar Pistorius and Allyson Felix.

In 2013, she was the solo host and reporter for ESPN's PAC-RIM Australia and New Zealand coverage of the final X Games from Los Angeles. She went on to lead ESPN International's coverage of the Americas Cup sailing in San Francisco later that year. In 2016, she covered her second Olympic games for ESPN as a reporter across track and field, soccer and tennis in Rio.

Ankier covered both the London 2012 Olympics as well as Rio 2016. Ankier was the live studio presenter of “Beyond the Game” world sports show filmed out of Istanbul for TRT World during the 2018 Fifa World Cup and has also been a regular contributor to The Tennis Channel out of Los Angeles.

== See also ==
- List of select Jewish track and field athletes
