= Iness Chepkesis Chenonge =

Kenyan runner (born 1982)

Iness Chepkesis Chenonge (born 1 February 1982 in Trans-Nzoia District) is a Kenyan runner who specializes in the 5000 metres. She was the bronze medallist at the 2002 Commonwealth Games and repeated the feat eight years later at the 2010 Commonwealth Games, forming a Kenyan sweep of the medals with Vivian Cheruiyot and Sylvia Kibet.

Chenonge was the 2008 winner of the Marseille-Cassis Classique Internationale road race. She set a personal best of 1:09:08 for the half marathon in March 2011, taking fifth place at the Lisbon Half Marathon.

== Major championship record ==
Year	Competition	Venue	Position	Event	Notes
Representing Kenya
2002	Commonwealth Games	Melbourne, Australia	3rd	5000 m	
2002	World Half Marathon Championships	Brussels, Belgium	20th	Half Marathon	
2003	World Athletics Final	Monte Carlo, Monaco	9th	5000 m	
2004	World Athletics Final	Monte Carlo, Monaco	7th	5000 m	
2005	World Athletics Final	Monte Carlo, Monaco	4th	5000 m	
2006	Commonwealth Games	Melbourne, Australia	6th	5000 m	
2006	World Athletics Final	Stuttgart, Germany	3rd	3000 m	
2009	World Cross Country Championships	Amman, Jordan	10th	Long race	
2009	World Championships	Berlin, Germany	6th	5000m	
2009	World Athletics Final	Thessaloniki, Greece	4th	3000 m	
2009	World Athletics Final	Thessaloniki, Greece	7th	5000 m	
2010	Continental Cup	Split, Croatia	5th	3000 m	
2010	Commonwealth Games	New Delhi, India	3rd	5000 m	

=== Personal bests ===
- 1500 metres – 4:08.61 (2009)
- 3000 metres – 8:39.29 min (2006)
- 5000 metres – 14:39.19 min (2010)
- Half marathon – 1:09:08 hrs (2011)
