= John Kelai =

Kenyan long-distance runner

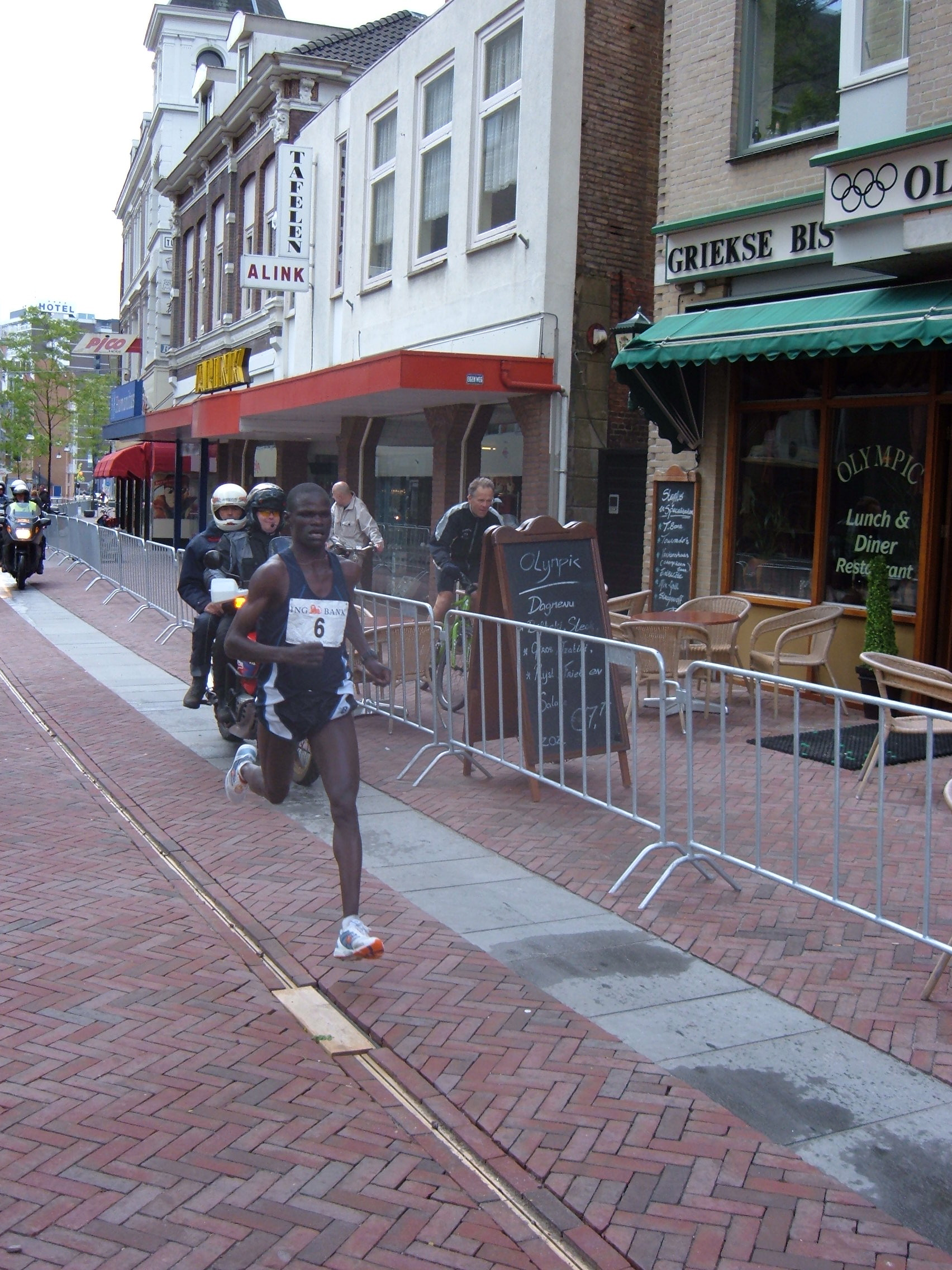
En route to victory at the 2005 Enschede Marathon

John Ekiru Kelai (born 29 December 1976) is a male long-distance runner from Kenya, who specialises in the marathon. He set his personal best of 2:09:09 hours for the distance at the 2005 edition of the Eindhoven Marathon, where he finished fourth. He is a two-time winner of the Enschede Marathon, also in the Netherlands, and had consecutive wins at the Mumbai Marathon in 2007–2008.

== Biography ==
Kelai won the 2003 Singapore Marathon, the 2004 Brussels Marathon, and was the 2007 winner of the Toronto Waterfront Marathon. In 2009 he was third at the Mumbai Marathon, failing to defend his title, and took fourth at both the Singapore and Karstadt Marathons.

He was selected for the marathon at the 2010 Commonwealth Games and he moved away from the field in the final 10 km to become Commonwealth champion (only the second Kenyan man to take the title after Douglas Wakiihuri). "I am so humbled to win here. It is an honour. I didn't know I could be the winner", said Kelai, "I feel on top of the world". He stayed on in Asia for 2011, coming sixth at the Mumbai Marathon and third in Singapore.

He was invited to the 2012 Brighton Marathon and was third in a Kenyan podium sweep.

== Achievements ==
Year	Competition	Venue	Position	Event	Notes
Representing Kenya
2003	Singapore Marathon	Singapore	1st	Marathon	2:19:02
2004	Brussels Marathon	Brussels, Belgium	1st	Marathon	2:10:59
2004	Singapore Marathon	Singapore	4th	Marathon	2:17:49
2005	Enschede Marathon	Enschede, Netherlands	1st	Marathon	2:11:44
2005	Eindhoven Marathon	Eindhoven, Netherlands	4th	Marathon	2:09:09
2005	Singapore Marathon	Singapore	5th	Marathon	2:16:58
2006	Enschede Marathon	Enschede, Netherlands	2nd	Marathon	2:12:05
2006	Eindhoven Marathon	Eindhoven, Netherlands	14th	Marathon	2:18:37
2007	Mumbai Marathon	Mumbai, India	1st	Marathon	2:12:30
2007	National Capital Marathon	Ottawa, Canada	4th	Marathon	2:11:10
2007	Toronto Waterfront Marathon	Toronto, Canada	1st	Marathon	2:09:30
2008	Mumbai Marathon	Mumbai, India	1st	Marathon	2:12:22
2008	Toronto Waterfront Marathon	Toronto, Canada	5th	Marathon	2:12:43
2009	Mumbai Marathon	Mumbai, India	3rd	Marathon	2:12:13
2009	Ruhr Marathon	Essen, Germany	4th	Marathon	2:11:15
2009	Singapore Marathon	Singapore	4th	Marathon	2:13:14
2010	Enschede Marathon	Enschede, Netherlands	1st	Marathon	2:12:17
2010	Commonwealth Games	Delhi, India	1st	Marathon	2:14:35
