= Joseph Birech =

Kenyan long distance runner

Joseph Birech is a Kenyan long-distance runner who won the bronze medal at the 2010 Commonwealth Games in the 10,000 meters race He has also won multiple Great Scottish Run titles.
