= Uganda at the 2010 Commonwealth Games =

- CGF code: UGA
- CGA: Uganda Olympic Committee
- Website: nocuganda.com

in Delhi, India
- Competitors: 65
- Medals Ranked 18th: Gold 2 Silver 0 Bronze 0 Total 2

Commonwealth Games appearances (overview)
- 1954; 1958; 1962; 1966; 1970; 1974; 1978; 1982; 1986; 1990; 1994; 1998; 2002; 2006; 2010; 2014; 2018; 2022; 2026; 2030

Uganda competed in the 2010 Commonwealth Games held in Delhi, India, from 3 to 14 October 2010. Sixty five athletes and eighteen officials attended the games. The athletes competed in badminton, rugby, squash, tennis, table tennis, swimming and athletics.

== Medals ==
	(gold)	(silver)	(bronze)	Total
Uganda	2	0	0	2

== Medalists ==
Medal	Name	Sport	Event
Gold	Moses Kipsiro	Athletics	Men's 5000 m
Gold	Moses Kipsiro	Athletics	Men's 10000 m

== See also ==
- 2010 Commonwealth Games
