= Athletics at the 2010 Commonwealth Games =

Athletics at the XIX Commonwealth Games
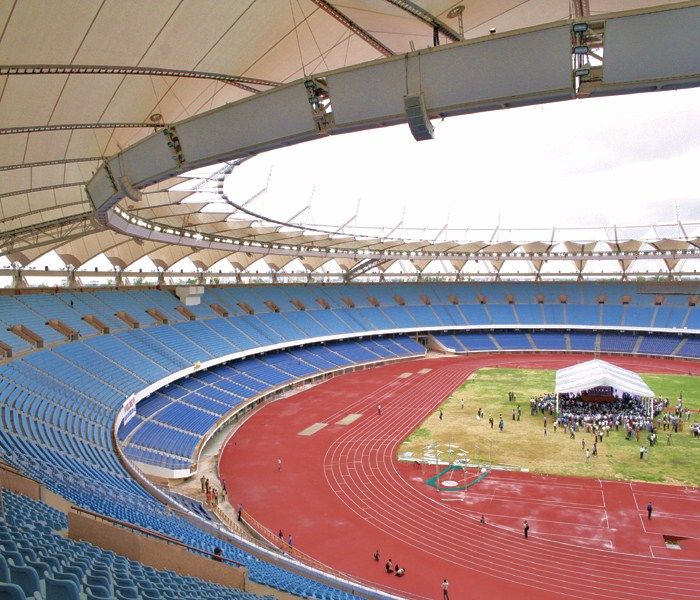
- Dates: 6–12, 14 October 2010
- Host city: Delhi, India
- Venue: Jawaharlal Nehru Stadium
- Events: 46 (+6 disabled)
- Participation: 845 athletes from 61 nations
- Records set: -

The athletics competition at the 2010 Commonwealth Games was held in New Delhi, India between 6 and 14 October. The track and field events took place between 6–12 October at the Jawaharlal Nehru Stadium while the marathon contests were held on a street course running through the city on 14 October.

A total of 46 athletics events were contested, which made it the sport with the second greatest number of medals on offer after the aquatics competition. The programme was almost identical to that of the 2006 edition, with the sole exception being the men's 50 km race walk, which was dropped. As in 2006, three men's and three women's disability athletics events were contested alongside the open competition.

Each of the Commonwealth Games Associations could send a maximum of three participants per event and a team of six for relay events. Kenya topped the medal table, with eleven gold medals and 29 medals in total. This was the first time that the nation achieved the feat, beating the typically dominant nations Australia (eleven golds, but 20 overall) and England (seven golds, 26 medals). Canada and Jamaica rounded out the top five while hosts India enjoyed their greatest ever haul at the Games, taking home two golds and twelve medals altogether.

Four failed doping tests have so far been announced: Nigerian Oludamola Osayomi was stripped of the women's 100 m title, and her compatriot Samuel Okon, a 110 m hurdler, was also disqualified. Both athletes tested positive for methylhexanamine. Rani Yadav, India's representative in the women's 20 km walk, was the third athlete to fail a test as 19-Norandrosterone was detected in her sample. Osayomi's 100 m stripped gold initially went to Sally Pearson of Australia but a delay in the appeals process saw Pearson disqualified for a false start some time after the race. Folashade Abugan of Nigeria tested positive for Testosterone prohormone following the final of the women's 400 metres. She was disqualified from the 400 metres and the Nigerian team, of which she was a member, were disqualified from the women's 4 × 400 metres relay where they had originally placed second.

== Preparation ==
A test event for the competition was scheduled in late July: the Asian All-Star Athletics Meet featured a number of prominent Asian athletes and demonstrated the stadium's readiness for games usage.

Many of the most prominent athletes from the Commonwealth were absent from the competition. Caster Semenya, Commonwealth champion Christine Ohuruogu, and Olympic medallist Lisa Dobriskey were among the athletes missing due to injury, but others including Usain Bolt, David Rudisha and Shelly-Ann Fraser opted to miss the competition out of choice – all ten of the year's fastest Commonwealth men's 100 m runners (including defending champion Asafa Powell) were not present. Further to this, two reigning world champions (English jumper Phillips Idowu and Australian thrower Dani Samuels) declared themselves out of the running on grounds of the security and accommodation conditions in Delhi. The competition's late scheduling within the track and field season was a primary factor in many athlete withdrawals.

In spite of this, a number of Olympic champions and other prominent names were selected to compete, including Australian Olympic/World champion Steve Hooker and New Zealand's Olympic/World Champion Valerie Adams, top Kenyan runners Nancy Langat, Vivian Cheruiyot and Ezekiel Kemboi, Bahamian high jumper Donald Thomas, and South Africa's Commonwealth champions L.J. van Zyl and Sunette Viljoen. Former world record holder Steve Cram emphasised the Games' role in developing younger athletes: "That's what it was for me, at 17 years old I went to the Commonwealth Games because Coe and Ovett didn't go. Nobody at the time was telling me it was bad that Coe and Ovett weren't there."

The stadium's track and field was damaged during the opening ceremony and major works – including the re-laying of the tarmac on the track and grass on the infield – took place in the 24 hours leading up to the first day of athletics events at the stadium. Three training venues were allocated for the athletics events: the Commonwealth Games Village 2010, Thyagaraj Sports Complex and the Delhi University sports complex.

== Medal summary ==
=== Men ===
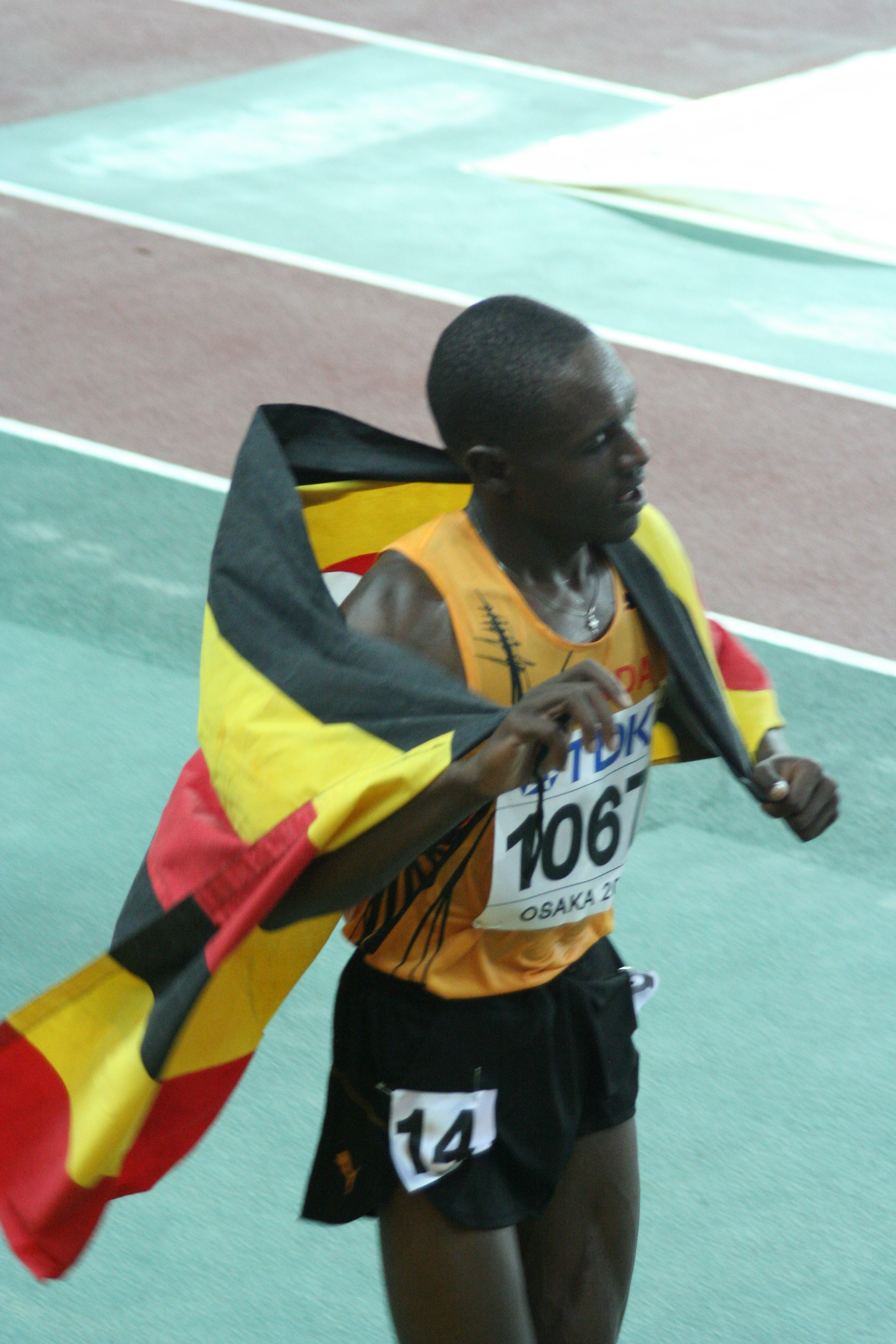
Moses Ndiema Kipsiro, men's 5000 metres and 10,000 metres champion

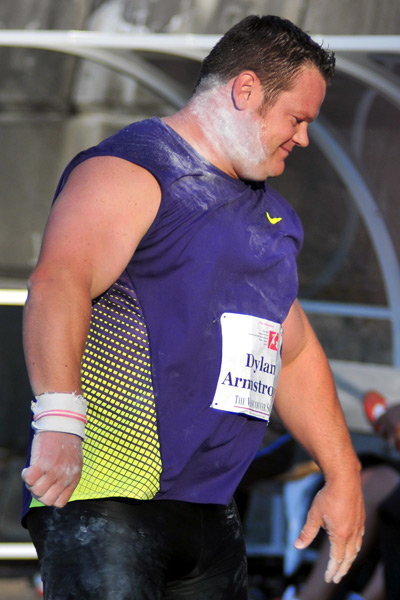
Dylan Armstrong, men's shot put champion

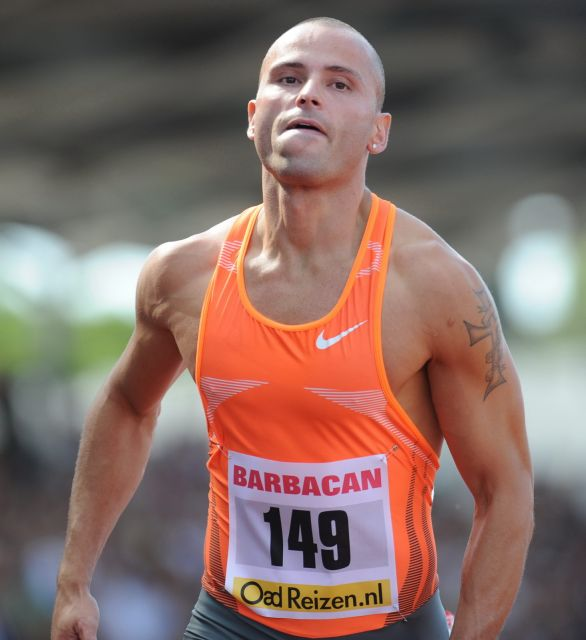
Andy Turner won the men's 110 m hurdles

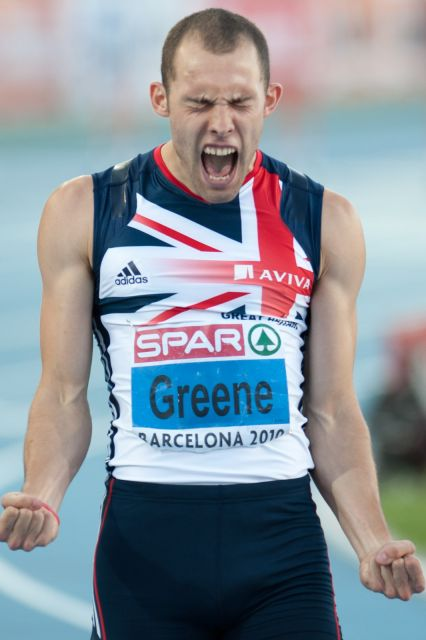
Dai Greene won the men's 400 metre hurdles

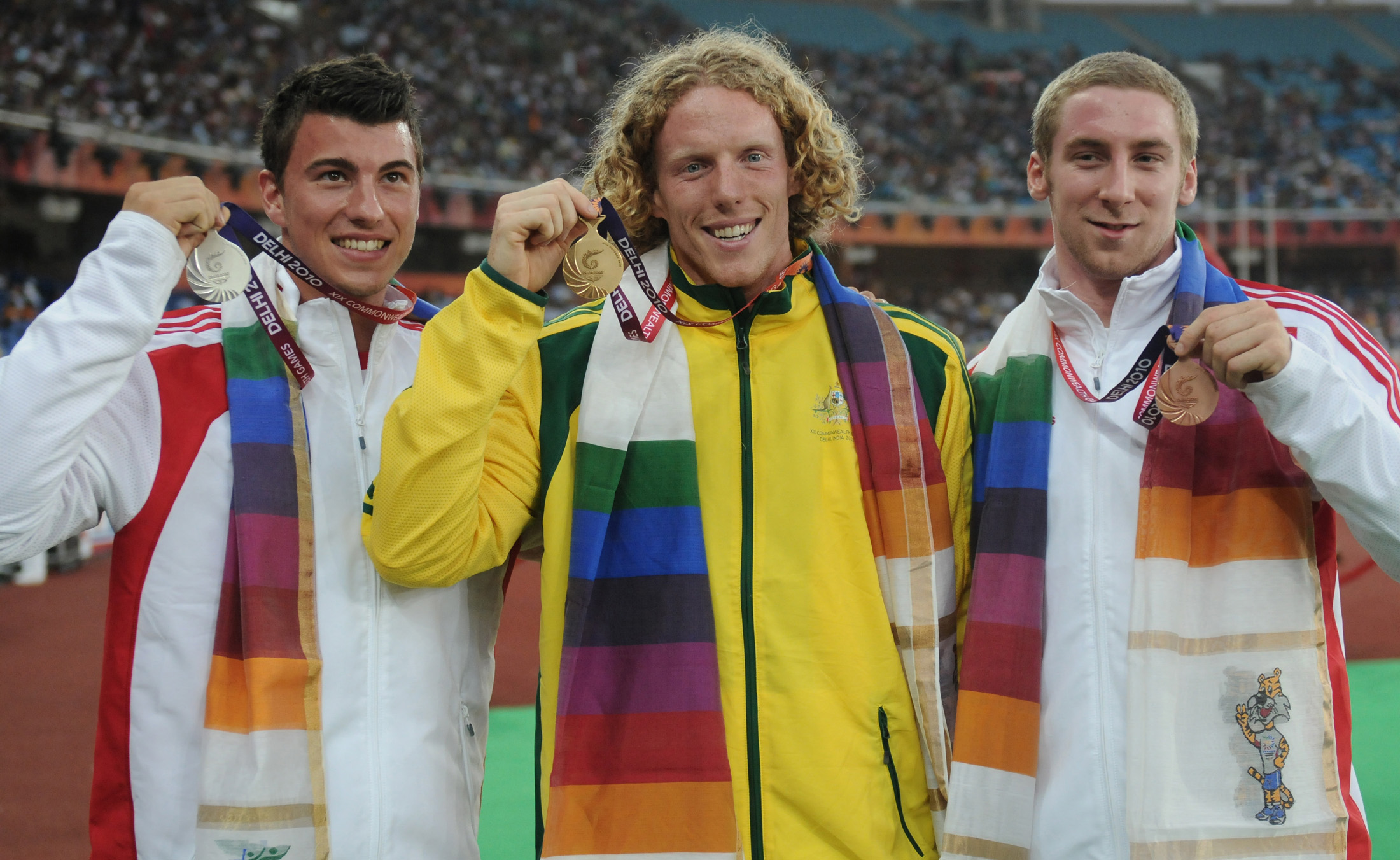
XIX Commonwealth Games-2010 Delhi Winners of (Pole Vault Men's), Steve Hooker of Australia (Gold), Steven Lewis of England (Silver) and Max Eaves of England (Bronze), during the medal ceremony of the event

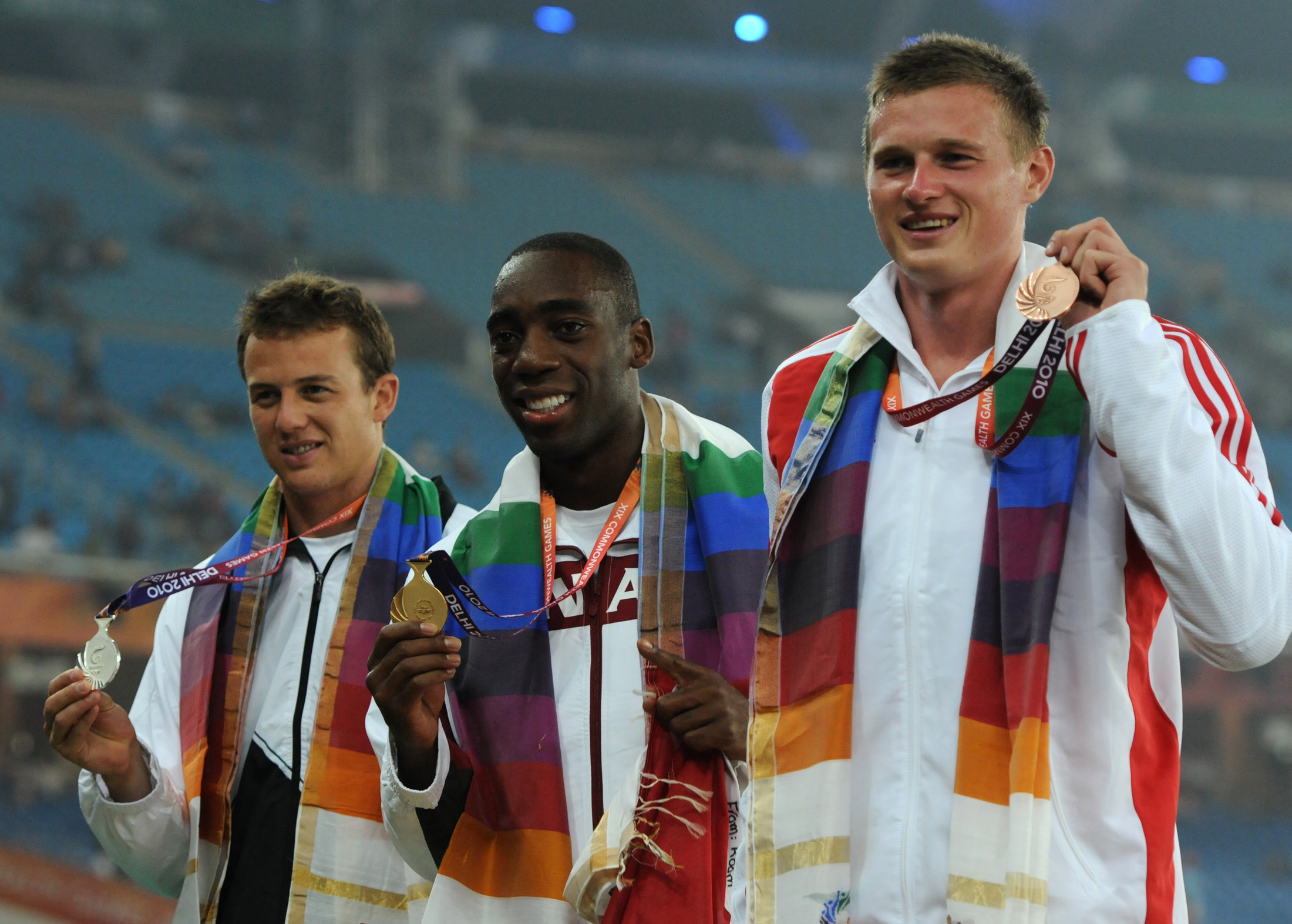
Men's Decathlon winners: Nelson Adjetey Jami of Canada (Gold), Brent Newdick of New Zealand (Silver) and Martin Brockman of England (Bronze)

Event	Gold		Silver		Bronze	
100 metres	Lerone Clarke; Jamaica	10.12	Mark Lewis-Francis; England	10.20	Aaron Armstrong; Trinidad and Tobago	10.24
200 metres	Leon Baptiste; England	20.45	Lansford Spence; Jamaica	20.49	Christian Malcolm; Wales	20.52
400 metres	Mark Mutai; Kenya	45.44	Sean Wroe; Australia	45.46	Ramon Miller; Bahamas	45.55
800 metres	Boaz Kiplagat Lalang; Kenya	1:46.60	Richard Kiplagat; Kenya	1:46.95	Abraham Kiplagat; Kenya	1:47.37
1500 metres	Silas Kiplagat; Kenya	3:41.78	James Magut; Kenya	3:42.27	Nick Willis; New Zealand	3:42.38
5000 metres	Moses Ndiema Kipsiro; Uganda	13:31.25	Eliud Kipchoge; Kenya	13:31.32	Mark Kiptoo; Kenya	13:32.58
10,000 metres	Moses Ndiema Kipsiro; Uganda	27:57.39	Daniel Lemashon Salel; Kenya	27:57.57	Joseph Kiptoo Birech; Kenya	27:58.58
110 metres hurdles	Andy Turner; England	13.38	William Sharman; England	13.50	Lawrence Clarke; England	13.70
400 metres hurdles	Dai Greene; Wales	48.52	L. J. van Zyl; South Africa	48.63	Rhys Williams; Wales	49.19
3000 metres steeplechase	Richard Mateelong; Kenya	8:16.39	Ezekiel Kemboi; Kenya	8:18.47	Brimin Kipruto; Kenya	8:19.65
4 × 100 metres relay	England (ENG); Ryan Scott; Leon Baptiste; Marlon Devonish; Mark Lewis-Francis	38.74	Jamaica (JAM); Lerone Clarke; Lansford Spence; Rasheed Dwyer; Remaldo Rose; Steve Slowly*	38.79	India (IND); Rahamatulla Molla; Suresh Sathya; Shameer Naseema Manzile; Md Abdul Najeeb Qureshi	38.89
4 × 400 metres relay	Australia (AUS); Joel Milburn; Kevin Moore; Brendan Cole; Sean Wroe; Ben Offereins*	3:03.30	Kenya (KEN); Vincent Koskei; Vincent Kiilo; Anderson Mutegi; Mark Mutai	3:03.84	England (ENG); Conrad Williams; Nick Leavey; Richard Yates; Robert Tobin; David Hughes*; Graham Hedman*	3:03.97
Marathon	John Kelai; Kenya	2:14:35	Michael Shelley; Australia	2:15:28	Amos Tirop Matui; Kenya	2:15:58
20 kilometres walk	Jared Tallent; Australia	1:22:18	Luke Adams; Australia	1:22:41	Harminder Singh; India	1:23:27
High jump	Donald Thomas; Bahamas	2.32 m	Trevor Barry; Bahamas	2.29 m	Kabelo Kgosiemang; Botswana	2.26 m
Pole vault	Steven Hooker; Australia	5.60 m	Steven Lewis; England	5.60 m	Max Eaves; England	5.40 m
Long jump	Fabrice Lapierre; Australia	8.30 m	Greg Rutherford; England	8.22 m	Ignisious Gaisah; Ghana	8.12 m
Triple jump	Tosin Oke; Nigeria	17.16 m	Hugo Mamba; Cameroon	17.14 m	Renjith Maheswary; India	17.07 m
Shot put	Dylan Armstrong; Canada	21.02 m GR	Dorian Scott; Jamaica	20.19 m	Dale Stevenson; Australia	19.99 m
Discus throw	Benn Harradine; Australia	65.45 m	Vikas Gowda; India	63.69 m	Carl Myerscough; England	60.64 m
Hammer throw	Chris Harmse; South Africa	73.12 m	Alex Smith; England	72.95 m	Mike Floyd; England	69.34 m
Javelin throw	Jarrod Bannister; Australia	81.71 m	Stuart Farquhar; New Zealand	78.15 m	Kashinath Naik; India	74.29 m
Decathlon	Jamie Adjetey-Nelson; Canada	8070	Brent Newdick; New Zealand	7899	Martin Brockman; England	7712

* Athletes who participated in the heats only and received medals.

==== Men's para-sport ====
Event	Gold		Silver		Bronze	
100 metres (T46)	Simon Patmore; Australia	11.14	Samkelo Radebe; South Africa	11.25	Ayuba Abdullahi; Nigeria	11.37
1500 metres (T54)	Kurt Fearnley; Australia	3:19.86	Richard Colman; Australia	3:20.90	Josh Cassidy; Canada	3:21.14
Shot put (F32/34/52)	Kyle Pettey; Canada	1021 (11.44 m)	Dan West; England	969 (10.78 m)	Hamish MacDonald; Australia	889 (9.92 m)

=== Women ===
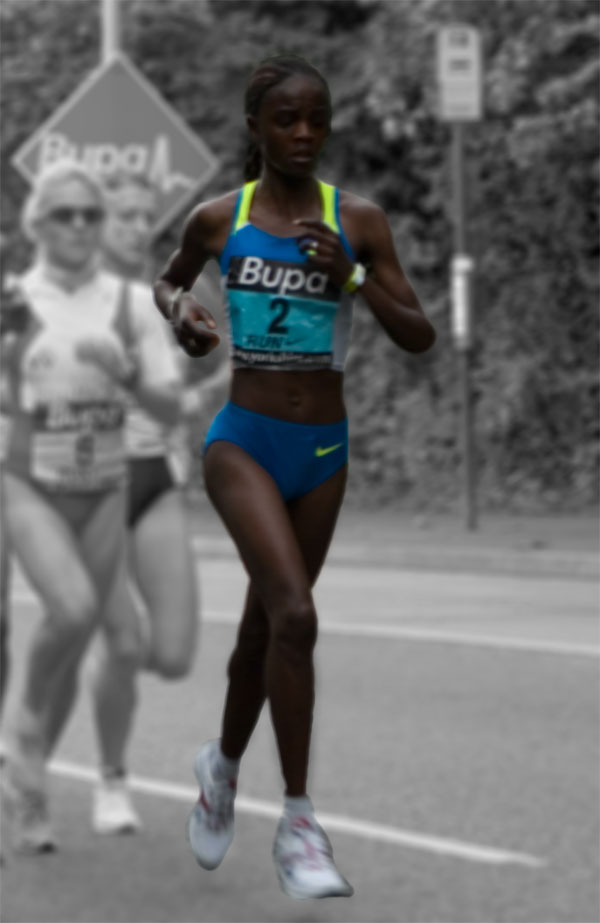
Grace Momanyi of Kenya won the women's 10,000 metres

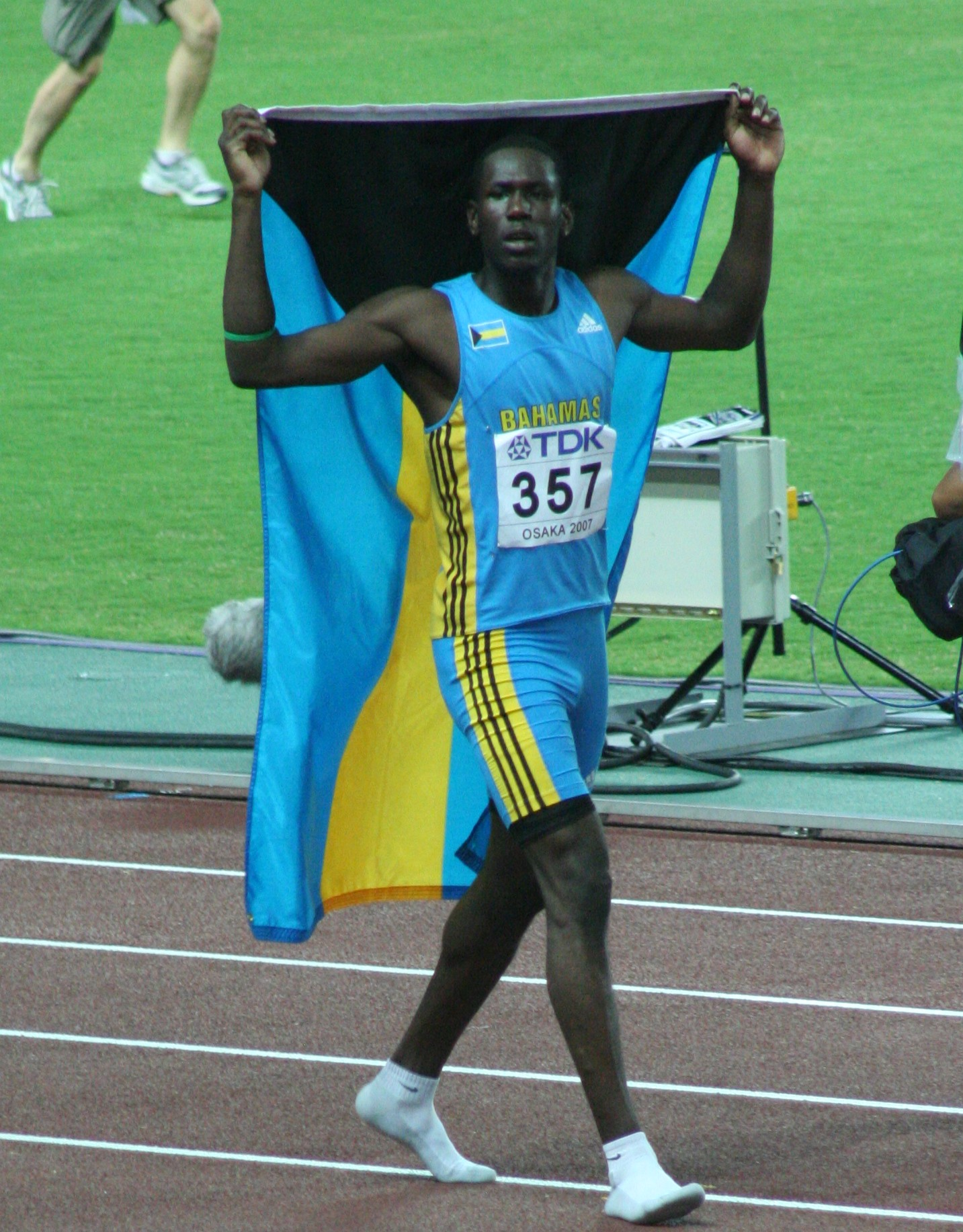
Donald Thomas was the victor in the men's highjump

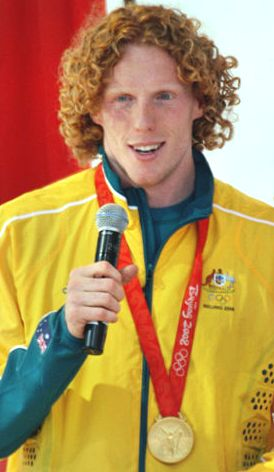
Steve Hooker of Australia won the men's pole vault

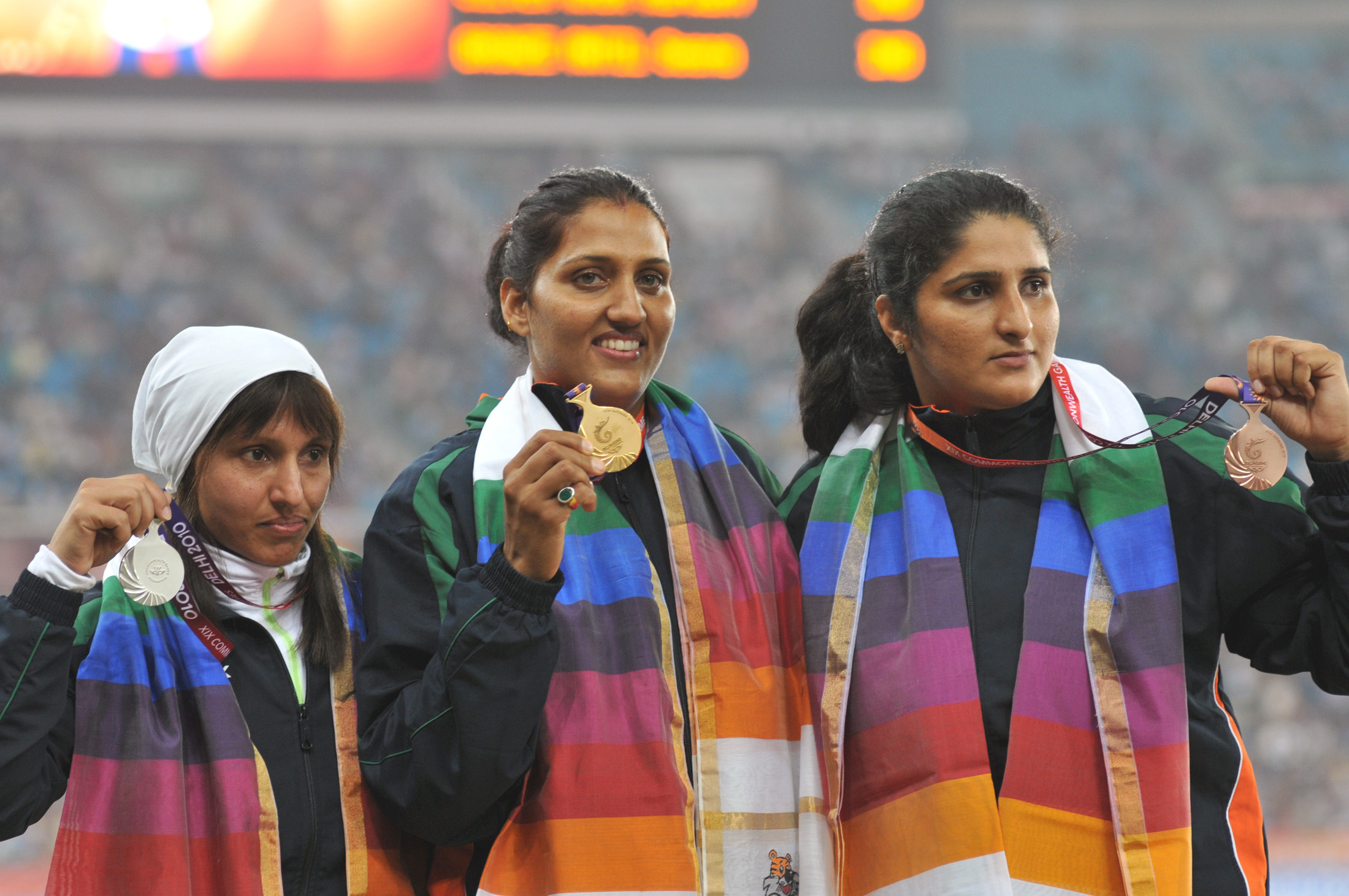
Winners of Discus (Women's) Krishna Poonia of India (Gold), Harwant Kaur of India (Silver) and Seema Antil of India (Bronze) during the medal presentation ceremony

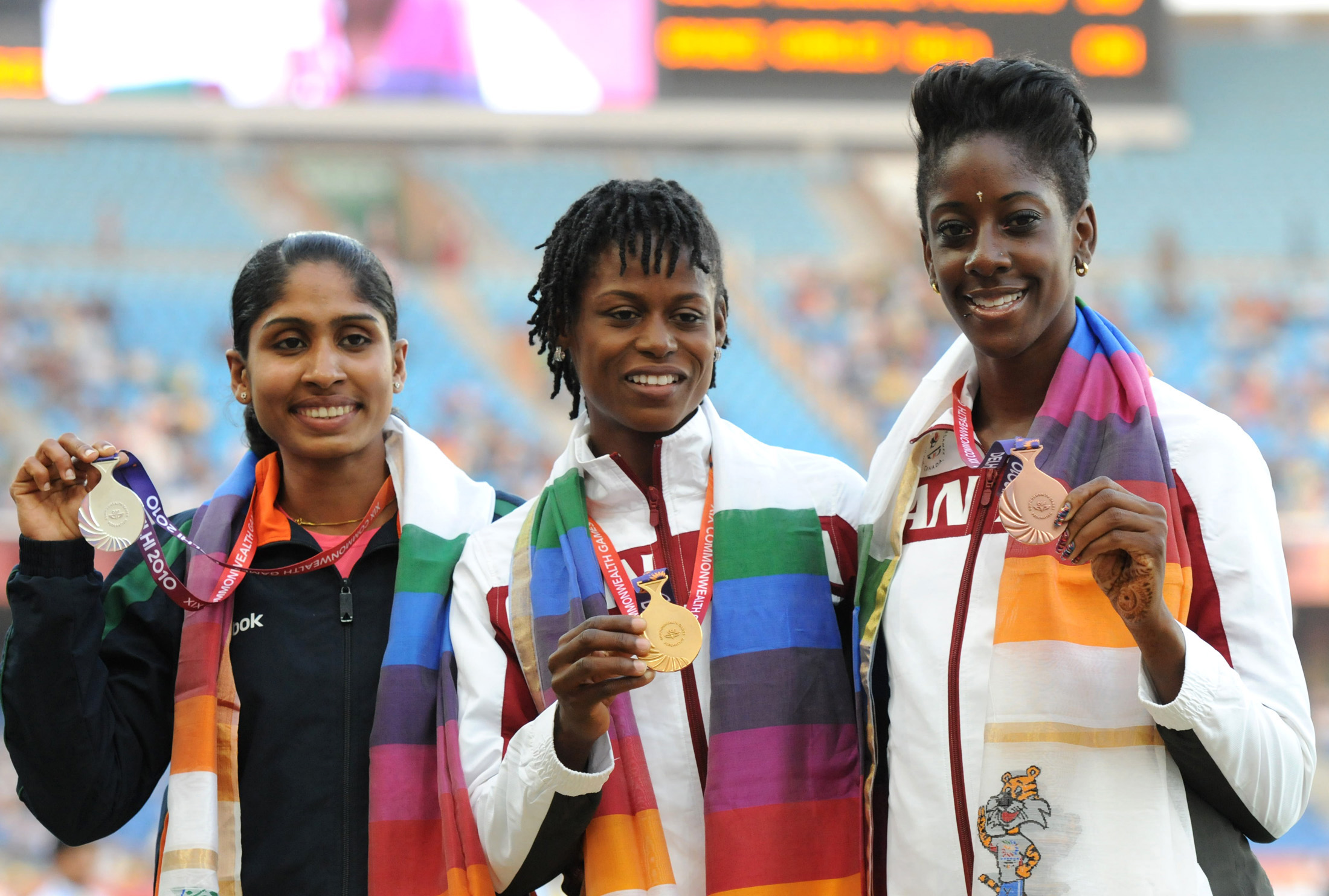
XIX Commonwealth Games-2010 Delhi (Women's) Athletics Long Jump Alice Falaiye of Canada (Gold), Prajusha Maliakkal of India (Silver) and Tabia Charles of Canada (Bronze), during the medal presentation ceremony

Event	Gold		Silver		Bronze	
100 metres	Natasha Mayers; Saint Vincent and the Grenadines	11.37	Katherine Endacott; England	11.44	Delphine Atangana; Cameroon	11.48
200 metres	Cydonie Mothersille; Cayman Islands	22.89	Abiodun Oyepitan; England	23.26	Adrienne Power; Canada	23.52
400 metres	Amantle Montsho; Botswana	50.10 GR	Aliann Pompey; Guyana	51.65	Christine Amertil; Bahamas	51.96
800 metres	Nancy Langat; Kenya	2:00.01	Nikki Hamblin; New Zealand	2:00.05	Diane Cummins; Canada	2:00.13
1500 metres	Nancy Langat; Kenya	4:05.26 GR	Nikki Hamblin; New Zealand	4:05.97	Stephanie Twell; Scotland	4:06.15
5000 metres	Vivian Cheruiyot; Kenya	15:55.12	Sylvia Kibet; Kenya	15:55.61	Ines Chenonge; Kenya	16:02.47
10,000 metres	Grace Momanyi; Kenya	32:34.11	Doris Changeywo; Kenya	32:36.97	Kavita Raut; India	33:05.28
100 metres hurdles	Sally Pearson; Australia	12.67	Angela Whyte; Canada	12.98	Andrea Miller; New Zealand	13.25
400 metres hurdles	Muizat Ajoke Odumosu; Nigeria	55.28	Eilidh Child; Scotland	55.62	Nickiesha Wilson; Jamaica	56.06
3000 metres steeplechase	Milcah Chemos Cheywa; Kenya	9:40.96	Mercy Wanjiru Njoroge; Kenya	9:41.54	Gladys Jerotich Kipkemoi; Kenya	9:52.51
4 × 100 metres relay	England (ENG); Katherine Endacott; Montell Douglas; Laura Turner; Abiodun Oyepitan	44.19	Ghana (GHA); Rosina Amenebede; Elizabeth Amolofo; Beatrice Gyaman; Janet Amponsah	45.24	India (IND); Geetha Saati; Srabani Nanda; P. K. Priya; H. M. Jyothi	45.25
4 × 400 metres relay	India (IND); Manjeet Kaur; Sini Jose; Ashwini Akkunji; Mandeep Kaur; Jauna Murmu*; Chitra Soman*	3:27.77	England (ENG); Kelly Massey; Vicki Barr; Meghan Beesley; Nadine Okyere; Joice Maduaka*	3:29.51	Canada (CAN); Amonn Nelson; Adrienne Power; Vicki Tolton; Carline Muir; Ruky Abdulai*,	3:30.20
Marathon	Irene Jerotich; Kenya	2:34:32	Irene Mogake; Kenya	2:34:43	Lisa Weightman; Australia	2:35:25
20 kilometres walk	Johanna Jackson; England	1:34:22	Claire Tallent; Australia	1:36:55	Grace Njue; Kenya	1:37:49
High jump	Nicole Forrester; Canada	1.91 m	Sheree Francis; Jamaica	1.88 m	Levern Spencer; Saint Lucia	1.88 m
Pole vault	Alana Boyd; Australia	4.40 m	Marianna Zachariadi; Cyprus	4.40 m	Kate Dennison; England; Carly Dockendorf; Canada; Kelsie Hendry; Canada	4.25 m
Long jump	Alice Falaiye; Canada	6.50 m	Prajusha Maliakkal; India	6.47 m	Tabia Charles; Canada	6.44 m
Triple jump	Trecia-Kaye Smith; Jamaica	14.19 m	Ayanna Alexander; Trinidad and Tobago	13.91 m	Tabia Charles; Canada	13.84 m
Shot put	Valerie Adams; New Zealand	20.47 m GR	Cleopatra Borel-Brown; Trinidad and Tobago	19.03 m	Margaret Satupai; Samoa	16.43 m
Discus throw	Krishna Poonia; India	61.51 m	Harwant Kaur; India	60.16 m	Seema Antil; India	58.46 m
Hammer throw	Sultana Frizell; Canada	68.57 m GR	Carys Parry; Wales	64.93 m	Zoe Derham; England	64.04 m
Javelin throw	Sunette Viljoen; South Africa	62.34 m GR	Kim Mickle; Australia	60.90 m	Justine Robbeson; South Africa	60.03 m
Heptathlon	Louise Hazel; England	6156	Jessica Zelinka; Canada	6100	Grace Clements; England	5819

* Athletes who participated in the heats only and received medals.

==== Women's para-sport ====
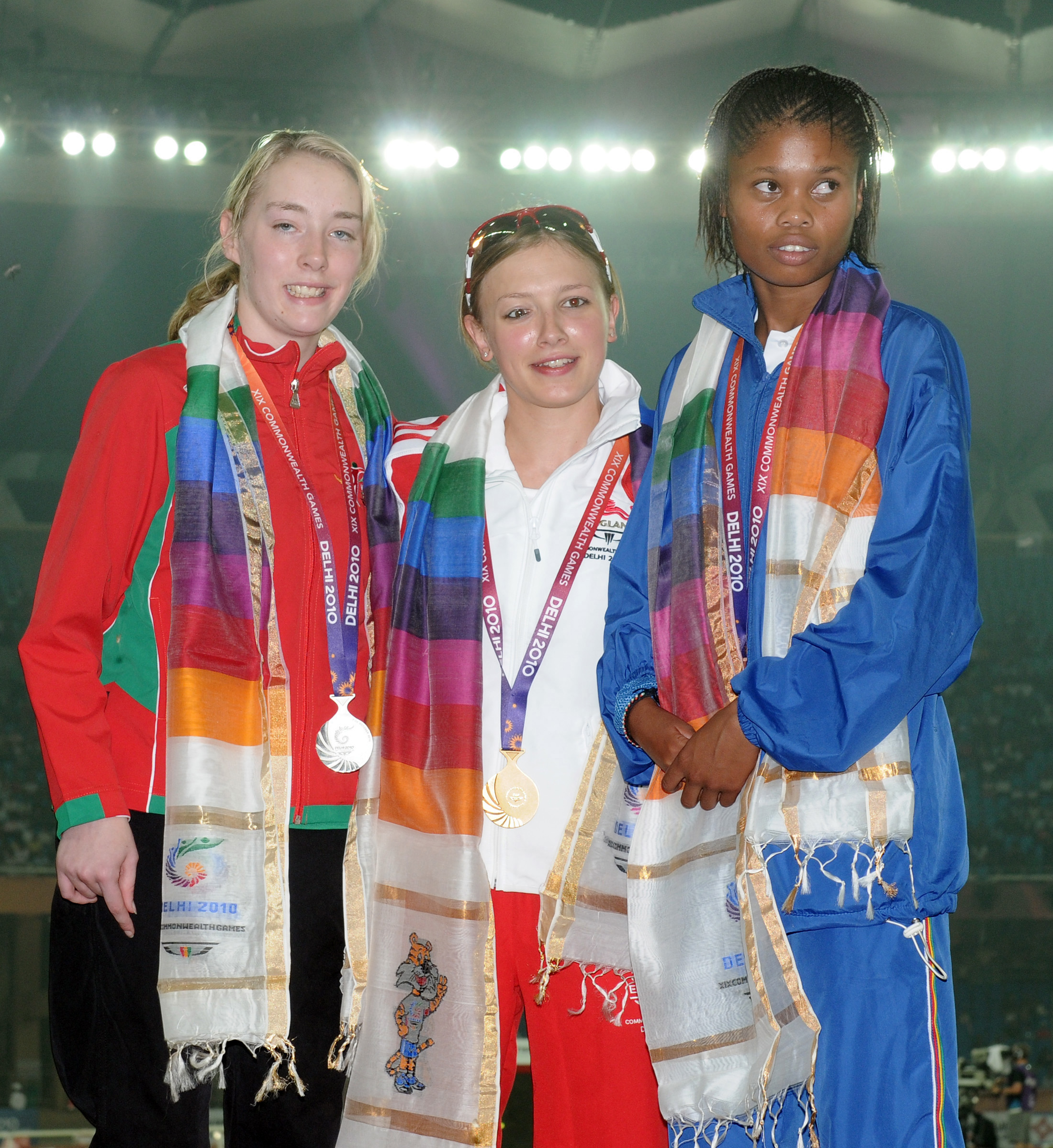
XIX Commonwealth Games-2010 Delhi Winners of 100 m (Women's T37) Hart Katrina of England (Gold), Mcloughlin Jenny of Wales (Silver) and Benson Johanna of Namibia (Bronze)

Event	Gold		Silver		Bronze	
100 metres (T37)	Katrina Hart; England	14.36	Jenny McLoughlin; Wales	14.68	Johanna Benson; Namibia	14.81
1500 metres (T54)	Diane Roy; Canada	3:53.95	Chineme Obeta; Nigeria	4:09.29	Anita Fordjour; Ghana	4:18.83
Shot put (F32–34/52/53)	Louise Ellery; Australia	1110 (6.17 m)	Jess Hamill; New Zealand	979 (7.17 m)	Gemma Prescott; England	952 (5.54 m)

== Games statistics ==
At the competition Amantle Montsho (Botswana) and Cydonie Mothersill (Cayman Islands) all won the first ever Commonwealth gold medals for their respective countries. Natasha Mayers (St. Vincent and Grenadines), won the first gold medal ever by a female for her country. The number of medal sweeps in the athletics (6) was at an all-time high for the competition: Kenya took all top three spaces in four events, England beat all in the men's hurdles while hosts India completed a 1–2–3 in the women's discus.

== Medal table ==
* Host nation (India)

Rank	Nation	Gold	Silver	Bronze	Total
1	Kenya	11	10	8	29
2	Australia	11	6	3	20
3	England	7	9	10	26
4	Canada	7	2	8	17
5	Jamaica	2	4	1	7
6	India*	2	3	7	12
7	Nigeria	2	3	1	6
8	South Africa	2	2	1	5
9	Uganda	2	0	0	2
10	New Zealand	1	5	2	8
11	Wales	1	2	2	5
12	Bahamas	1	1	1	3
13	Botswana	1	0	1	2
14	Cayman Islands	1	0	0	1
14	Saint Vincent and the Grenadines	1	0	0	1
16	Trinidad and Tobago	0	2	1	3
17	Ghana	0	1	2	3
18	Cameroon	0	1	1	2
18	Scotland	0	1	1	2
20	Cyprus	0	1	0	1
21	Guyana	0	0	1	1
21	Namibia	0	0	1	1
21	Saint Lucia	0	0	1	1
21	Samoa	0	0	1	1
Totals (24 entries)		52	53	54	159

== Participating nations ==
61 Nations competed leaving 11 that did not.

- Anguilla (7)
- Antigua and Barbuda (6)
- Australia (61)
- Bahamas (14)
- Bangladesh (4)
- Barbados (2)
- Belize (3)
- Bermuda (2)
- Botswana (11)
- British Virgin Islands (1)
- Brunei (1)
- Cameroon (10)
- Canada (40)
- Cayman Islands (8)
- Cook Islands (1)
- Cyprus (15)
- Dominica (4)
- England (92)
- Ghana (19)
- Grenada (6)
- Guernsey (7)
- Guyana (4)
- India (116)
- Jamaica (46)
- Jersey (2)
- Kenya (70)
- Kiribati (3)
- Lesotho (9)
- Malawi (6)
- Malaysia (8)
- Malta (1)
- Mauritius (12)
- Montserrat (5)
- Mozambique (5)
- Namibia (3)
- New Zealand (13)
- Nigeria (40)
- Niue (5)
- Northern Ireland (9)
- Pakistan (2)
- Papua New Guinea (18)
- Rwanda (14)
- Saint Kitts and Nevis (6)
- Saint Lucia (2)
- Saint Vincent and the Grenadines (2)
- Samoa (2)
- Scotland (19)
- Seychelles (5)
- Sierra Leone (12)
- Singapore (7)
- Solomon Islands (4)
- South Africa (8)
- Sri Lanka (15)
- Swaziland (2)
- Tanzania (9)
- Trinidad and Tobago (10)
- Turks and Caicos Islands (6)
- Tuvalu (6)
- Uganda (14)
- Wales (24)
- Zambia (4)
