= Rwanda at the 2010 Commonwealth Games =

- CGF code: RWA
- CGA: Rwanda National Olympic and Sports Committee

in Delhi, India
- Competitors: 22 in 5 sports
- Flag bearers: Opening: Closing:
- Medals: Gold 0 Silver 0 Bronze 0 Total 0

Commonwealth Games appearances (overview)
- 2010; 2014; 2018; 2022; 2026; 2030

Rwanda made its Commonwealth Games debut at the 2010 Commonwealth Games in Delhi, India, from October 3 to October 14, 2010. Rwanda was admitted to the Commonwealth of Nations in November 2009, becoming the second member state of the Commonwealth that has no colonial or constitutional links with the United Kingdom.

For its first participation in the Commonwealth Games, Rwanda was represented by a delegation of over 22 athletes, competing in athletics, boxing, cycling, swimming, and tennis.

The team did not win any medals.

== See also ==
- 2010 Commonwealth Games
- Rwanda at the Commonwealth Games
