= Venues of the 2010 Commonwealth Games =

The 2010 Commonwealth Games venues were all located in the host city of Delhi.

== Competition venues ==
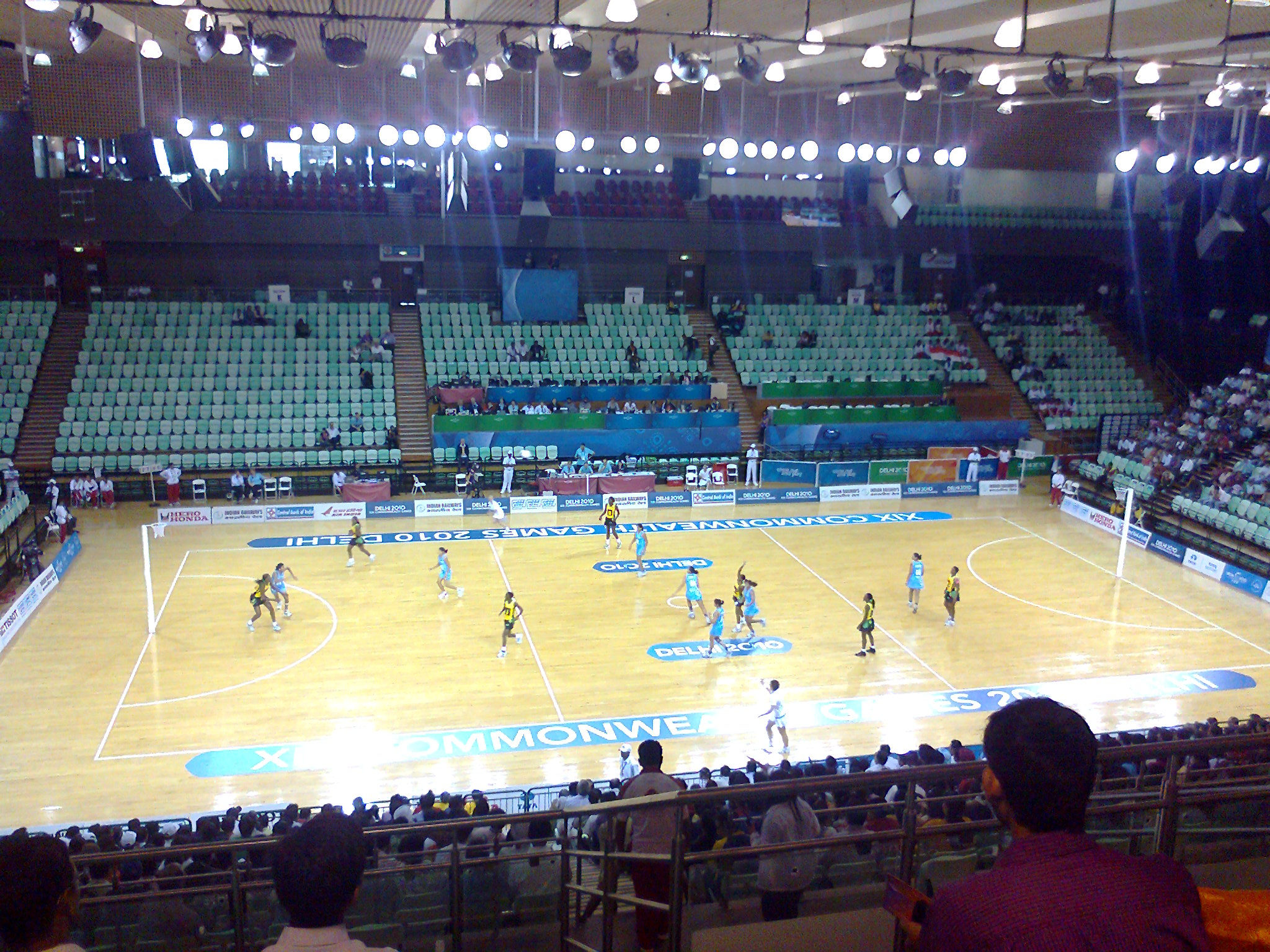
The Thyagaraj Sports Complex hosted netball during the games

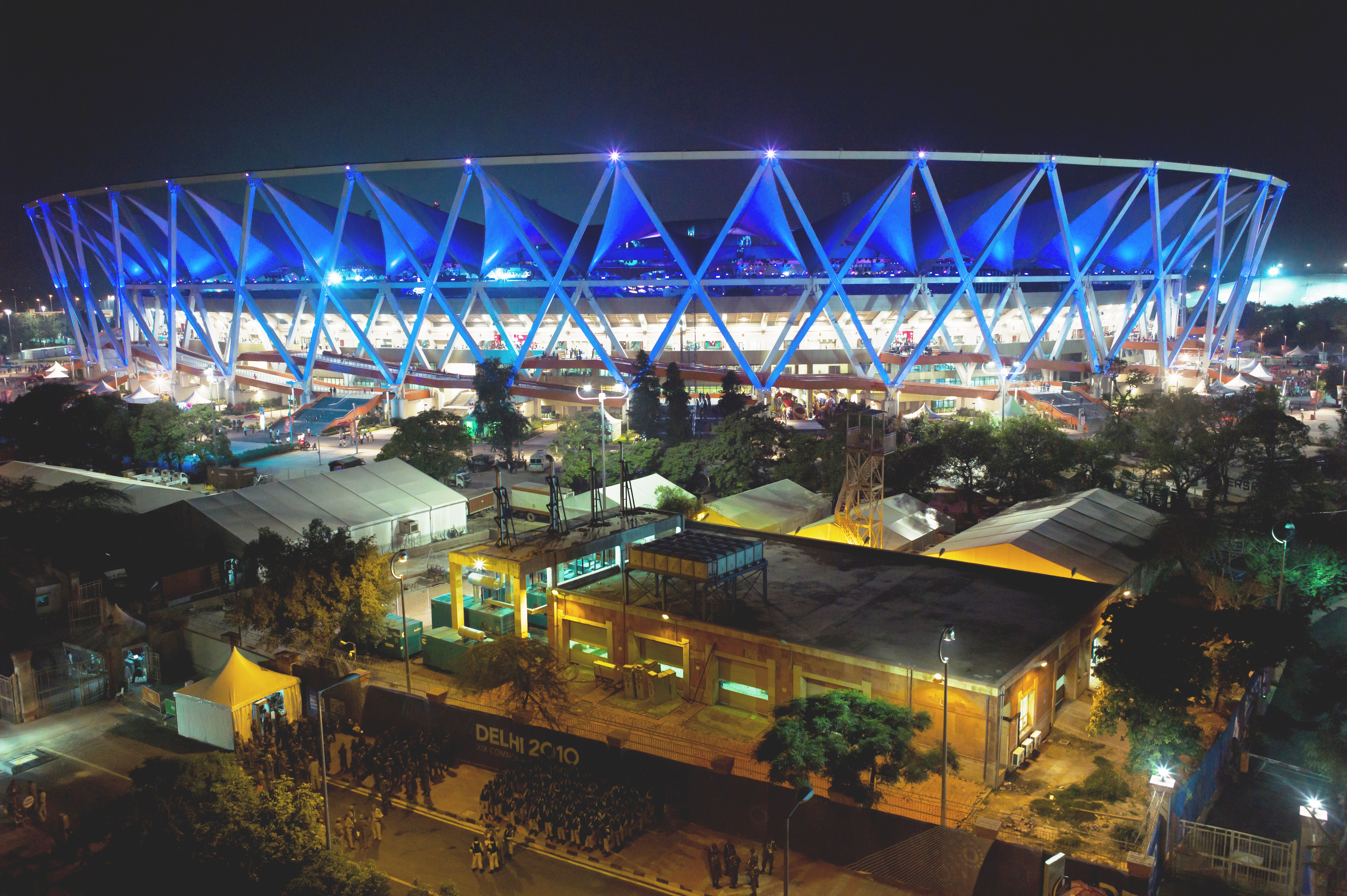
The Jawaharlal Nehru Sports Complex seen during the opening ceremony of the games

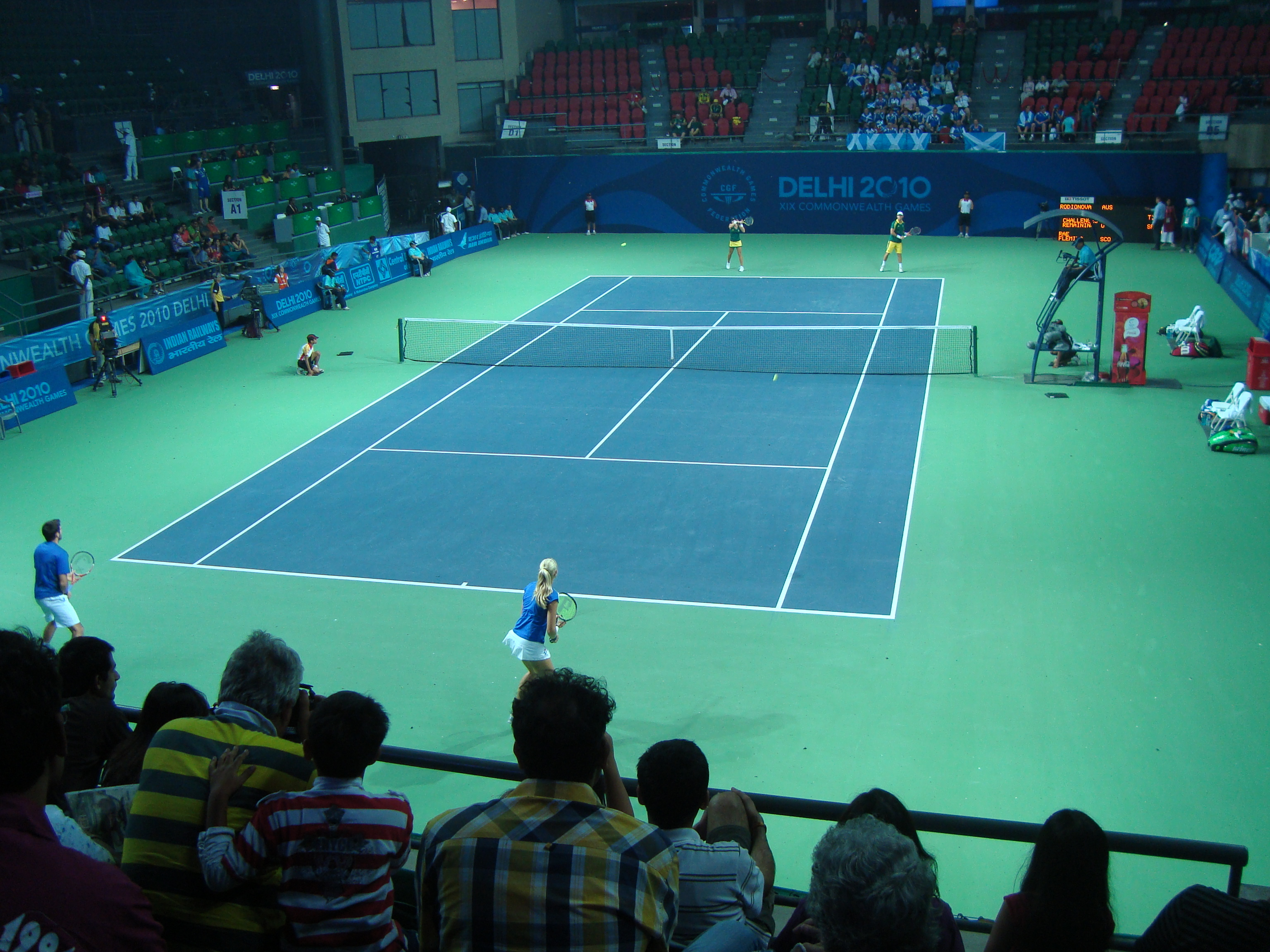
Tennis was held at the R.K. Khanna Tennis Complex during the games

Events took place at twelve competition venues, and twenty venues were set aside as training venues. A total of five venues were newly constructed for the Games and these were the Dr. Karni Singh Shooting Range, the Siri Fort Sports Complex, the Thyagaraj Sports Complex, the Yamuna Sports Complex and Delhi University Stadium. The largest venue was the Jawaharlal Nehru Stadium, which had a capacity of 60,000 during the Games. The stadium was the main venue of the Games, hosting both the opening and the closing ceremonies. On the other hand, the CRPF Shooting Range located in Kadarpur had the smallest seating capacity, at 345.

Locations of the Venues for the 2010 Commonwealth Games

=== Indoor ===
Venue		Sports	Capacity	Type	Ref.
CRPF Shooting Range		Shooting	345	Renovated	
Delhi University Stadium		Rugby sevens	10,132	New	
Dr. Karni Singh Shooting Range		Shooting	500; 1,000; 2,000	New	
Talkatora Indoor Stadium		Boxing	3,035		
Dr. S.P. Mukherjee Swimming Stadium		Aquatics	5,178	Renovated	
Indira Gandhi Sports Complex	Indoor Stadium	Gymnastics	14,348	Renovated	
Indira Gandhi Sports Complex	Velodrome	Cycling (Track)	4,000	Renovated	
Indira Gandhi Sports Complex	Wrestling Stadium	Wrestling	6,932	Renovated	
Jawaharlal Nehru Sports Complex	Jawaharlal Nehru Stadium	Athletics (Track and field)	60,000	Renovated	
Jawaharlal Nehru Sports Complex	Auditorium	Weightlifting	2,500	Renovated	
Major Dhyan Chand National Stadium		Hockey	19,118; 2,500	Renovated	
R. K. Khanna Tennis Complex		Tennis	5,015	Renovated	
Siri Fort Sports Complex		Badminton, Squash	4,748; 3,128	New	
Thyagaraj Sports Complex		Netball	4,494	New	
Yamuna Sports Complex		Archery, Table tennis	4,297	New	
Yamuna Sports Complex		Lawn bowls	2,111	Renovated	

=== Outdoor ===
- Free Church Sansad Marg Complex - Athletics (marathon, racewalking)
- Noida–Greater Noida Expressway - Cycling (road)

== Commonwealth Games Village ==
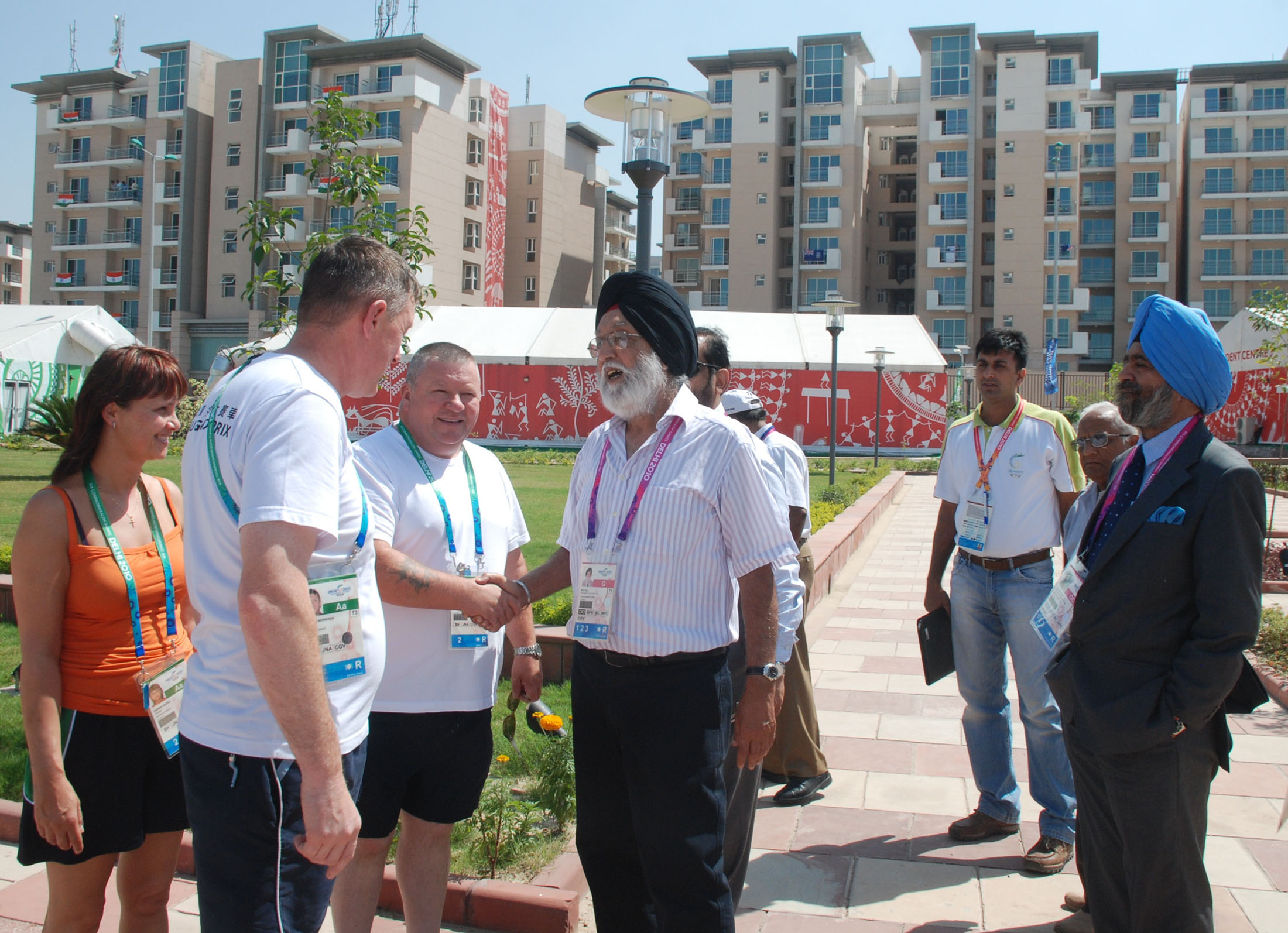
Union Minister of Youth Affairs and Sports, Dr. M.S. Gill meeting the members of Northern Ireland at the Games Village

The Commonwealth Games Village provided accommodation and training for athletes of the Games, and was open from 23 September to 18 October 2010. It was located along the east bank of the Yamuna river, in proximity to competition and training venues as well as city landmarks, and was spread over an area of 63.5 hectares (157 acres). Comprising five main zones—the Residential Zone, the International Zone, the Training Area, the Main Dining and the Operational Zone—the Games Village, which was a non-smoking zone, was universally accessible particularly to accommodate para-sport athletes. Two transport systems, provided free of charge, served athletes and team officials in the Games Village. The Internal Village Shuttle provided internal movement within the Games Village, operating 24 hours daily. Bus services linked the Games Village to competition and training venues, the airport, and the city centre, Connaught Place.

The Residential Zone specifically accommodated athletes and team officials, with 1,168 apartments in 34 residential towers. Each apartment had two to five bedrooms, giving 4,008 bedrooms in total; each bedroom accommodated two residents which differed from the traditional practice of providing athletes with a bedroom each. The entire zone itself was divided into four zones, styled after four unique folk art styles found in India as identified by a colour and an image: warli (red), gond (blue), madhubani (green) and sanjhi (purple). Nine Resident Centres, each serving hundreds of residents, were spaced across the residential towers, and they provided key services and facilities as well as entertainment. The Residential Zone also housed offices and services centres for the Commonwealth Games Associations, a polyclinic, religious services and casual dining facilities.

The International Zone served as the hub of the Games Village, offering retail and entertainment services as well as a rendezvous location for visitors and Games participants. Key facilities such as a bank, post office and general store were hosted there, alongside retail shops and entertainment facilities including a cinema and an Internet café. Live craft demonstrations, band performances and cultural programmes were also held at the Village. The Training Area, a zonal area by itself with an area of 15 hectares (37 acres), provided training facilities entirely within the Games Village, in what has been described as a first in the history of the Commonwealth Games. There were facilities for four sports, including a track and field, wrestling and weightlifting training halls and an Olympic-size pool. A fully equipped gymnasium and fitness centre, steam and sauna facilities, physiotherapy rooms, as well as a leisure pool complemented the sport-specific facilities.

The Games Village was said to have adopted green features, in line with the 'Green Games' principle of the 2010 Commonwealth Games, and it showcased and practiced sustainable development principles and practices. An in-house waste water treatment and reuse facility, organic waste treatment facilities, and solar powered energy were among the environmentally friendly practices adopted by the Delhi 2010 Commonwealth Games Organising Committee Headquarters (OC CWG Delhi 2010). At the same time, most of the transport fleet provided for the Games ran on green fuels such as battery electric vehicles and compressed natural gas. Residents and guests could also offset travel-accumulated carbon emissions by computing their footprint and then procuring carbon credits at the specifically created Green Games Carbon Neutrality Kiosk. The World Anti-Doping Agency set up an anti-doping education hub in collaboration with the organisers.

== Other venues ==
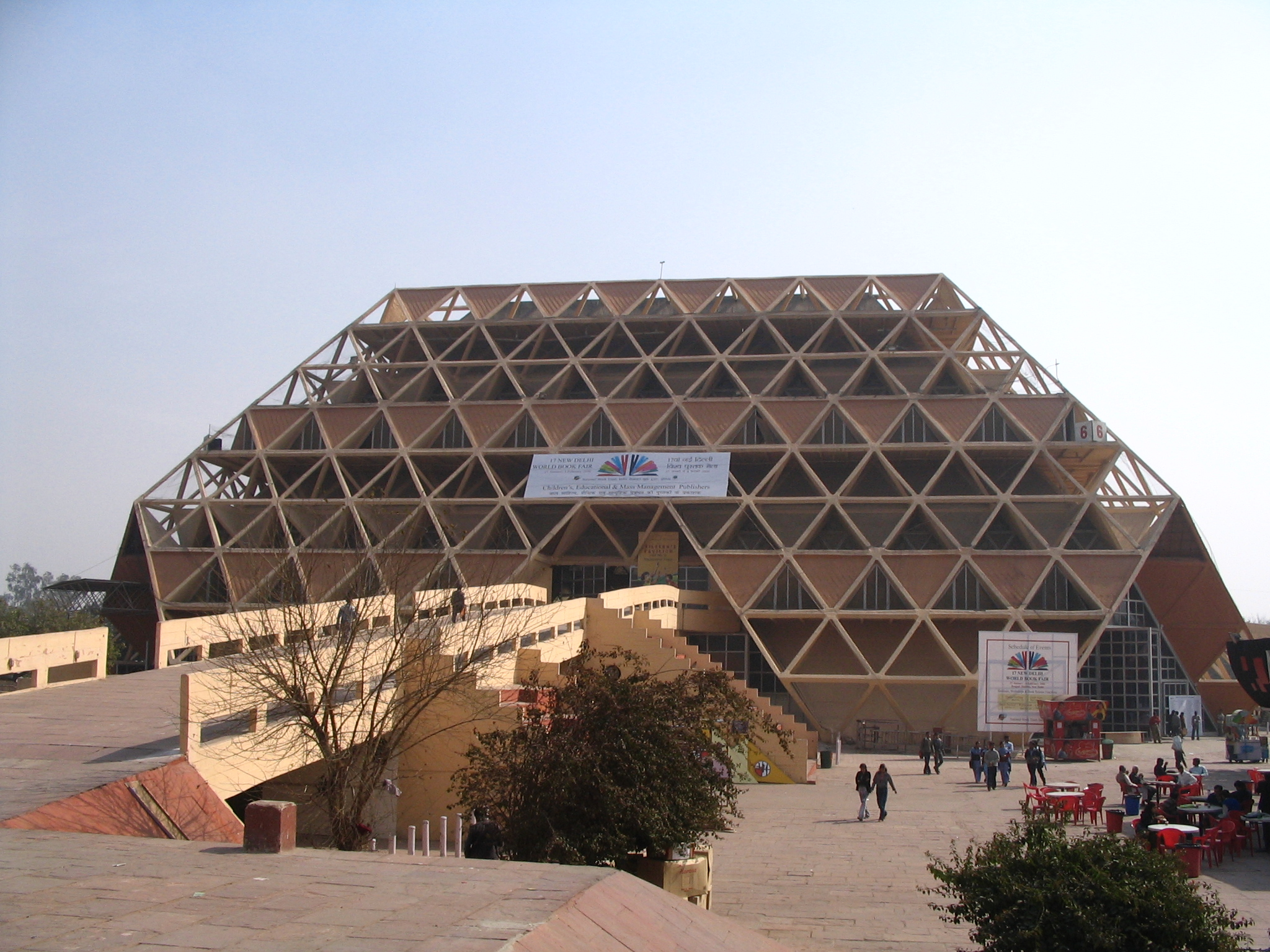
A number of venues, including the Main Media Centre of the games, was situated close to Pragati Maidan, the largest exhibition centre in Delhi.

There were three main non-competition venues in the Games, besides the Commonwealth Games Village (see above); namely the OC CWG Delhi 2010, the Main Media Centre, and the Games Family Hotel, Hotel Ashok. Situated in the New Delhi Municipal Council building in Connaught Place, the OC CWG Delhi 2010's office was spread over nine floors of the building, with a capacity to accommodate a workforce of over 1,200. The design of the building's interiors was intended to display 21st century India, described as an "amalgamation of tradition and technological advancement".

The Main Media Centre of the 2010 Commonwealth Games managed media-related activities, and comprised the International Broadcasting Centre and the Main Press Centre. It was set up in close proximity to the Games Village and the main venues at Pragati Maidan. State owned agencies managed both centres, with host broadcaster Prasar Bharti managing the International Broadcasting Centre and the Press Information Bureau managing the Main Press Centre. It was believed that by the time the Games are held, New Delhi would stop analogue broadcast and begin digital broadcast through a conditional access system, for which it is the first city in India to do so.

On 4 June 2009, a Memorandum of Understanding (MOU) was signed between OC CWG Delhi 2010 and the India Tourism Development Corporation which officially recognised Hotel Ashok as the Games Family Hotel. Following a major facelift, the hotel served as host to members of Commonwealth Games Associations, the CGF, International Sports Federations, the Indian Olympic Association as well as technical delegates. Also, Hotel Ashok hosted the facilitation offices of OC CWG Delhi 2010 and the CGF, with all events, meetings and conferences held there.

== Concerns over readiness and state of venues ==
Numerous concerns and controversies surfaced before and during the games which received media attention locally and internationally. Delays in the construction of the Games' venues were linked to corruption involving the Organising Committee. A number of infrastructural problems also occurred; these were highlighted by the collapse of a footbridge and the drop ceiling of the weightlifting venue. Less than two weeks before the opening ceremony, Commonwealth Games chief Mike Fennell wrote to the Indian Cabinet secretary, urging action in response to the Games Village being "seriously compromised." He said that although team officials were impressed with the international zone and main dining area, they were shocked by the state of accommodation. The BBC published photographs of the Games Village depicting the poor state of living quarters.

A number of countries expressed concern about unliveable conditions, with The Times of India reporting that the Scottish delegation apparently submitted a photograph of a dog defecating on a bed in the Games Village. Secretary general of the Organising Committee Lalit Bhanot countered the complaints of poor sanitation when he claimed that cultural differences accounted for differing standards of cleanliness in India and the western world. He was subsequently ridiculed by both the Indian and international media.

On the other hand, England's Chef de mission Craig Hunter praised the Games Village, remarking that "the Commonwealth Games Village here [in Delhi] is better than the Beijing Olympics". Bhanot claimed that the Games Village was "world-class" and "probably one of the best ever." Canadian Secretary of State (Sport) Gary Lunn supported the Games as well, claiming the Canadian delegation would "not get influenced by the negative publicity" surrounding the games. He added the difficulties faced by large events are often exaggerated by the media, as Canada had found during the Vancouver Winter Olympics earlier in the year.

== See also ==
- List of Commonwealth Games venues
