= 2025 World Para Athletics Championships – Women's 400 metres T20 =

Women's 400 metres T20 at the 2025 World Para Athletics Championships
- Venue: Jawaharlal Nehru Stadium
- Location: New Delhi,India
- Dates: 27 September

The women's 400 metres T20 competition at the 2025 World Para Athletics Championships, which will take place on 27 September 2025 in New Delhi, India.
