= 2010 Commonwealth Games =

Multi-sport event in Delhi, India

XIX Commonwealth Games
- Logo of the 2010 Commonwealth Games
- Host city: Delhi, India
- Motto: Come out and play
- Nations: 71
- Athletes: 4,352
- Events: 272 events in 21 disciplines
- Opening: 3 October 2010
- Closing: 14 October 2010
- Opened by: Charles, Prince of Wales and Pratibha Patil, President of India
- Closed by: Prince Edward, Earl of Wessex
- Athlete's Oath: Abhinav Bindra
- Queen's Baton Final Runner: Sushil Kumar
- Anthem: Jiyo Utho Badho Jeeto
- Main venue: Jawaharlal Nehru Stadium
- Website: www.CWGDelhi2010.org

The 2010 Commonwealth Games, officially known as the XIX Commonwealth Games and commonly known as Delhi 2010, was an international multi-sport event for the members of the Commonwealth that was held in Delhi, India, from 3 to 14 October 2010.

A total of 4,352 athletes from 71 Commonwealth nations and dependencies competed 272 events across 21 sports making it the largest Commonwealth Games, in terms of participation, to date. It was the largest international multi-sport event staged in India, which had previously hosted the Asian Games in 1951 and 1982. It was the first time that the Commonwealth Games were held in India and the second time it was held in Asia after Kuala Lumpur in 1998.

The events were held across 12 venues. The opening and closing ceremonies were held at the Jawaharlal Nehru Stadium, the main venue of the event. The preparation for the Games received widespread media attention, with criticism directed at the organisers for the slow pace of progress in the work related to the Games, and issues related to security and hygiene. However, the works were completed in time for the Games, and it went ahead as per schedule.

While some nations threatened with boycotts, all members of the Commonwealth participated in the event, with the exception of Fiji, which was suspended from the Commonwealth, and Tokelau, which didn't send a team. Australia led the medal tally with 177 medals including 74 golds. The host nation, India, achieved its best performance ever at the Commonwealth Games, finishing second, winning 101 medals including 38 golds.

== Host selection ==
The host city of the 2010 Commonwealth Games was selected on 14 November 2003 during the Commonwealth Games Federation (CGF) General Assembly in Montego Bay, Jamaica. Delhi, India competed with Hamilton, Canada, for the rights to host the Games. India's bid was under the motto New Frontiers and Friendships. India committed to give US$100,000 to each of the participating associations to train athletes, for a total of $7.2 million, while Canada offered $3.8 million. Delhi had earlier bid for the 1990 and 1994 Commonwealth Games but lost to Auckland and Victoria respectively. The Hamilton bid was Canada's attempt to hold the games for the fifth time. While Delhi had not previously hosted the Commonwealth Games, Vancouver was awarded the hosting rights of the 2010 Winter Olympics earlier in the year, and observers opined that the Olympics might upstage the Commonwealth Games. Delhi won the hosting rights over Hamilton with a 46-22 vote.

2010 Commonwealth Games bidding results
City	Country	Votes
Delhi	India	46
Hamilton	Canada	22

== Preparation and development ==
=== Venues ===
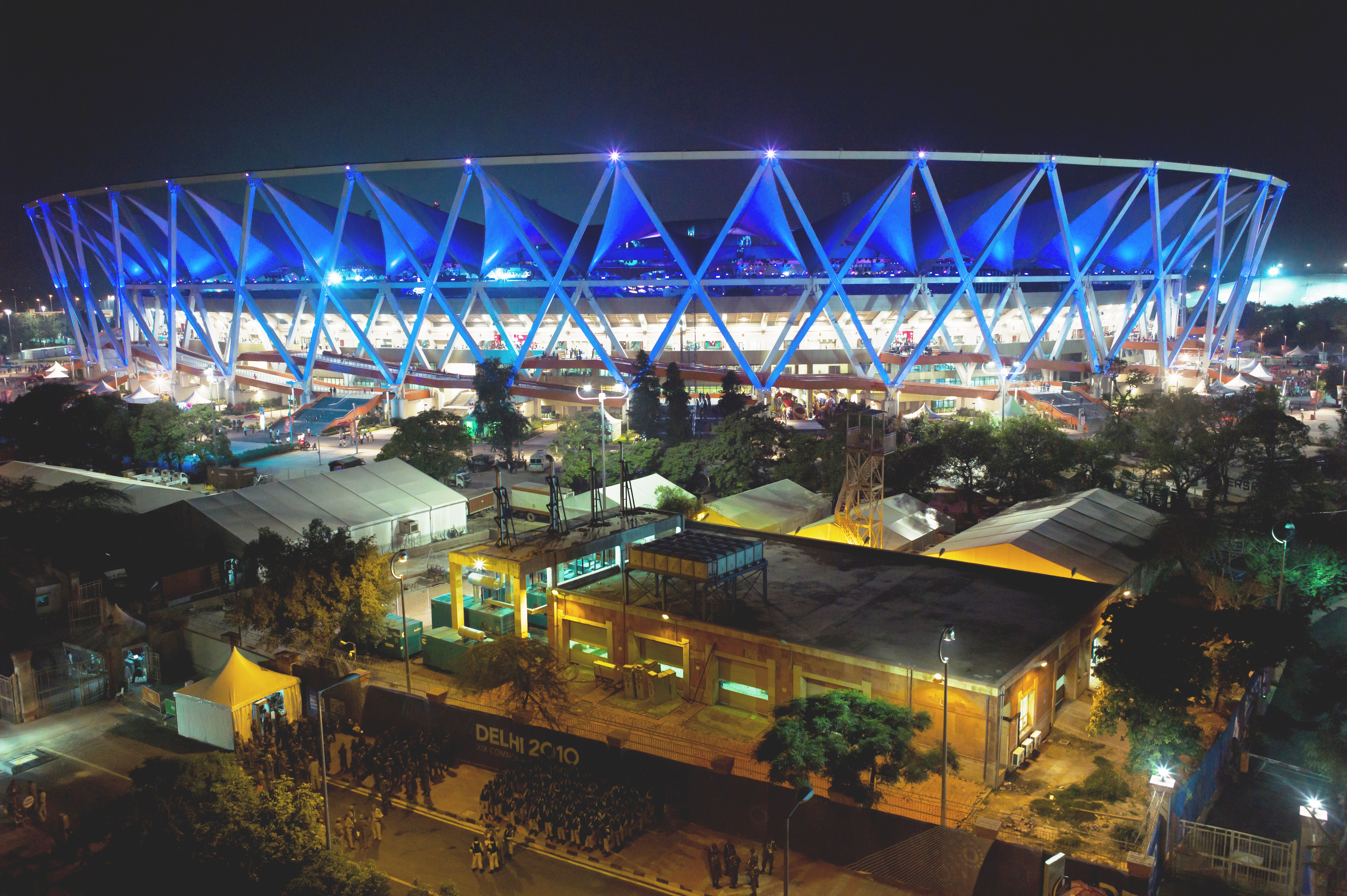
Jawaharlal Nehru Stadium, the venue of the opening and the closing ceremonies, and the athletics events

The sporting events were held across 12 venues.

- CRPF Shooting Range: Shooting
- Delhi University Stadium: Rugby Sevens
- Dr. Karni Singh Shooting Range: Shooting
- Dr. S.P. Mukherjee Swimming Stadium: Aquatics
- Indira Gandhi Sports Complex: Cycling, Gymnastics, Wrestling
- Jawaharlal Nehru Stadium: Athletics, Lawn Bowls, Weightlifting
- Major Dhyan Chand National Stadium: Field hockey
- R. K. Khanna Tennis Complex: Tennis
- Siri Fort Sports Complex: Badminton, Squash
- Talkatora Indoor Stadium: Boxing
- Thyagaraj Sports Complex: Netball
- Yamuna Sports Complex: Archery, Table Tennis

Five venues–Dr. Karni Singh Shooting Range, the Siri Fort Sports Complex, the Thyagaraj Sports Complex, the Yamuna Sports Complex, and the Delhi University Stadium, were newly constructed for the Games. The Indira Gandhi Sports Complex, and Jawaharlal Nehru Stadium underwent major renovations or an uplift. The largest venue was the Jawaharlal Nehru Stadium, with a capacity of 60,000, was the main venue of the event, hosting both the opening and the closing ceremonies.

Twenty training venues were used for the Games, of which one was used for archery; three for aquatics; two for lawn bowls; two for netball; eight for rugby sevens; two for shooting; one for squash; two for table tennis; one for weightlifting, three for wrestling, and two for tennis.

=== Non-sporting venues ===
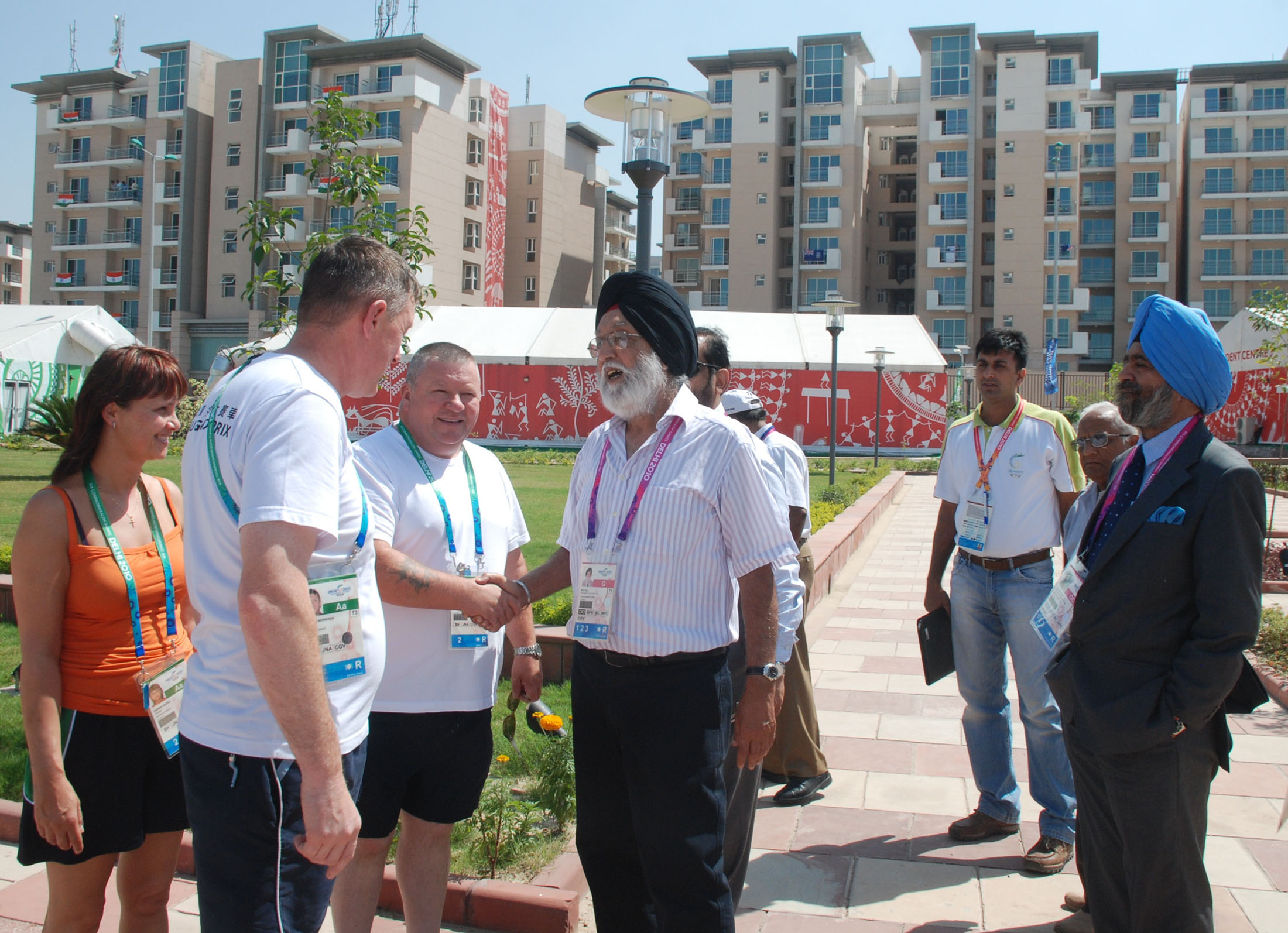
Sports Minister M. S. Gill meeting with the athletes at the Games Village

The New Delhi Municipal Council building served as the headquarters of the Commonwealth Games Organizing Committee. The Commonwealth Games Village provided accommodation and training for athletes of the Games. It was spread over an area of 63.5 ha (157 acres), along the east bank of the Yamuna River. It consisted of five zones—the Residential Zone, the International Zone, the Training Area, the Main Dining, and the Operational Zone, and was accessible to para-sport athletes as well. Athletes and accompanying delegates were provided free food and accommodation at the Games Village.

=== Budget ===
The initial budget for hosting the Games as estimated by the Indian Olympic Association (IOA) in 2003 was ₹16.2 billion (US$170 million). However, the total budget escalated to an estimated ₹115 billion (US$1.2 billion), which excluded non-sports-related infrastructure development. The overall cost of hosting the Games was estimated to be ₹700 billion (US$7.5 billion), making it the most expensive Commonwealth Games ever.

=== Infrastructure and facilities ===
Logo of the "Green Games" initiative

The organisers signed a Memorandum of Understanding with the United Nations Environment Programme to launch the "Green Games" initiative, aimed at adopting environmentally sustainable practices and reducing the carbon footprint during the Games.

A four-lane, 5 km (3.1 mi)-long elevated road, from Lodhi Road to Sarai Kale Khan, linking the Games Village to the Jawaharlal Nehru Stadium, was constructed, to reduce the travel time between the venues from the usual 40 minutes to six minutes. The Government of India spent over ₹160 billion (US$1.7 billion) for upgrading public infrastructure in Delhi. This included the construction of new bridges, flyovers, and underpasses, widening and relaying arterial roads, installation of new traffic signs and bus shelters, and beautifying public areas. Dedicated lanes were introduced on selected highways to facilitate faster movement between the sporting venues and the Games village.

Over 3,500 new low-floor buses were introduced by the Delhi Transport Corporation to cater to the transport requirements of the athletes and spectators. Athletes and delegated were provided free transport to and from the sporting venues, and a free sightseeing trip to the Taj Mahal. The Delhi Tourism and Transportation Development Corporation launched India's first Hop-On Hop-Off bus service (HOHO Delhi), which were equipped with digital video screens, and trained guides for providing information to the tourists. Radio Frequency Identification was used to tag vehicles in parking lots at the sporting venues to help organise mass parking and increase security.

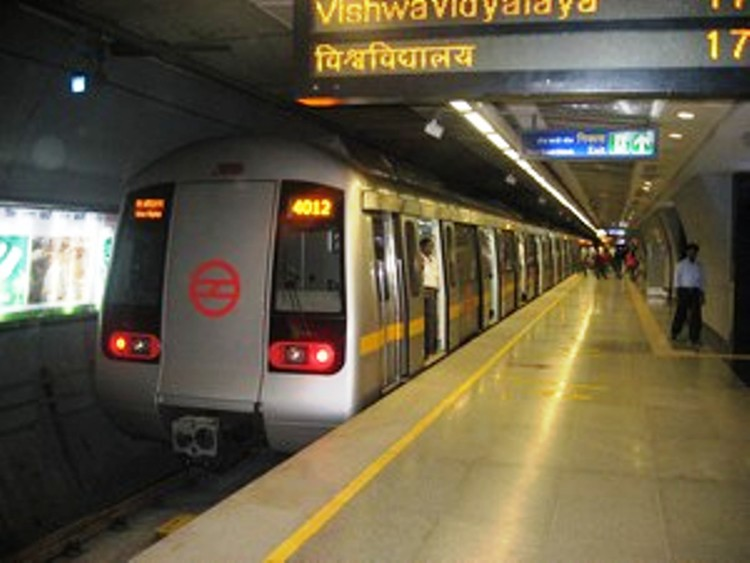
The second phase of the Delhi Metro was completed ahead of the Games

The Delhi Metro Rail Corporation completed the second phase of the Delhi Metro, extending to 125 km (78 mi), ahead of the Commonwealth Games. The Indira Gandhi International Airport was modernised, and expanded. A new terminal, spread over 500,000 ft^{2} (46,000 m^{2}), was constructed at a cost of $2 billion, and was capable of handling 34 million passengers per annum. A third runway had been added in 2008, which enabled the airport to operate more than 70 flights an hour.

In preparation for the expected influx of English-speaking tourists for the Games, the Government of Delhi implemented a program to teach English for cab drivers, security workers, waiters, porters, and other service staff. To cater to the power requirements, the government increased the power generation capacity, and upgraded the power infrastructure and power distribution networks. A large-scale construction and beautification project was undertaken, that resulted in the demolition of hundreds of temporary homes and shelters. Bamboo screens were erected around city's slums to hide them from the sights of the visitors. Beggars were relocated from the city's streets, and the Delhi High Court set up mobile courts that determined whether each beggar was to be sent back to his/her state of residence, or be permitted to remain in government-shelters.

=== Queen's baton relay ===
The Queen's Baton Relay was inaugurated at the Buckingham Palace on 29 October 2009. The baton, containing a message from Elizabeth II to the athletes, visited 69 Commonwealth nations before reaching India. It arrived in India on 25 June 2010 through the Wagah Border crossing from Pakistan. The baton was designed by Foley Design studio and was created by Titan in collaboration with Bharat Electronics Limited. The 664 mm (26.1 in)-high baton weighed 1.9 kg (4.2 lb), and consisted of a triangular section of aluminium twisted into a helix shape and then coated with soils collected from various regions of India. A jewel-encrusted box was used to house the Queen's message, which was laser-engraved onto a 18 carat gold leaf. The baton was illuminated by several LEDs, capable of producing various illuminated designs.

=== Opening ceremony ===
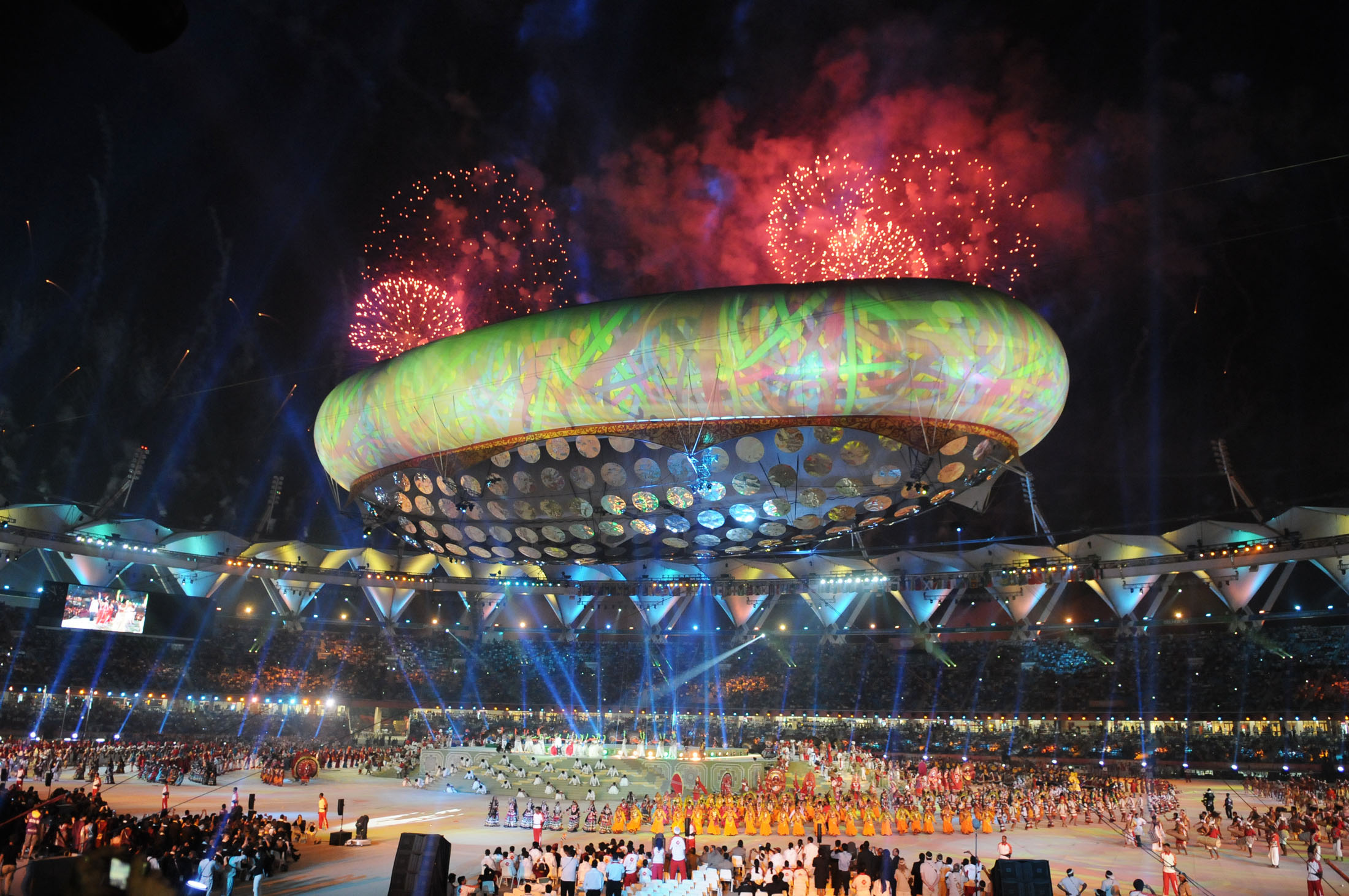
Opening ceremony at the Jawaharlal Nehru Stadium

The opening ceremony was held at the Jawaharlal Nehru Stadium, the main stadium of the event. It began at 19:00 IST on 3 October. The opening ceremony was directed by Bharat Bala. It featured over 8,000 performers, and lasted for two-and-a-half hours. It was estimated to have costed ₹3.5 billion (equivalent to ₹8.6 billion or US$92 million in 2026).

The ceremony was divided into six separate segments, each showcasing the diverse cultures of India. The countdown took place on the large screen in the stadium, and was accompanied by fireworks. The centerpiece of the ceremony was the helium aerostat, which acted as a giant 360° screen for spectators. It began with a showcase of a variety of drummers from all parts of India, accompanied by seven-year-old tabla player. The ceremony showcased a fusion of various classical dances from all parts of India, mehendi decorations, sand paintings, and yoga. The title song was performed by A. R. Rahman, and singer Hariharan sang the welcome song for the Games, titled "Swagatam", along with thousands of school children.

Charles III, the Prince of Wales (representing Elizabeth II as the Head of the Commonwealth) and Pratibha Patil, the President of India, officially declared the Games open. Manmohan Singh, the Prime Minister of India, and three heads of state–Mohamed Nasheed, the President of the Maldives, Marcus Stephen, the President of Nauru, Albert II, the Prince of Monaco, and Anand Satyanand, the Governor General of New Zealand, attended the ceremony.

=== Closing ceremony ===
The closing ceremony was held on 14 October 2014 at the Jawaharlal Nehru Stadium, and featured Indian and Scottish performers. The Commonwealth Games flag was handed over to representatives of Glasgow, Scotland, which was to host the XX Commonwealth Games in 2014.

== Participating teams ==
There were 71 participating Commonwealth Games Associations at the 2010 Commonwealth Games. As Fiji was suspended from the Commonwealth, it was banned from participating in the Games. Rwanda fielded a team in the Commonwealth Games for the first time, after becoming a Commonwealth member in 2009.

Note: The numbers of athletes from each participating association is shown in brackets.

Participating Commonwealth countries and territories
- Anguilla (12)
- Antigua and Barbuda (17)
- Australia (377)
- Bahamas (24)
- Bangladesh (70)
- Barbados (39)
- Belize (9)
- Bermuda (14)
- Botswana (49)
- British Virgin Islands (2)
- Brunei (12)
- Cameroon (20)
- Canada (251)
- Cayman Islands (17)
- Cook Islands (31)
- Cyprus (56)
- Dominica (15)
- England (365)
- Falkland Islands (15)
- The Gambia (17)
- Ghana (64)
- Gibraltar (15)
- Grenada (10)
- Guernsey (43)
- Guyana (34)
- India (495) (host)
- Isle of Man (33)
- Jamaica (48)
- Jersey (33)
- Kenya (136)
- Kiribati (17)
- Lesotho (10)
- Malawi (43)
- Malaysia (203)
- Maldives (28)
- Malta (22)
- Mauritius (55)
- Montserrat (5)
- Mozambique (10)
- Namibia (30)
- Nauru (6)
- New Zealand (192)
- Nigeria (101)
- Niue (24)
- Norfolk Island (22)
- Northern Ireland (80)
- Pakistan (54)
- Papua New Guinea (79)
- Rwanda (22)
- Saint Helena (4)
- Saint Kitts and Nevis (7)
- Saint Lucia (13)
- Saint Vincent and the Grenadines (14)
- Samoa (53)
- Scotland (191)
- Seychelles (26)
- Sierra Leone (31)
- Singapore (68)
- Solomon Islands (12)
- South Africa (113)
- Sri Lanka (94)
- Swaziland (11)
- Tanzania (40)
- Tokelau (1)
- Tonga (22)
- Trinidad and Tobago (82)
- Turks and Caicos Islands (8)
- Tuvalu (3)
- Uganda (65)
- Vanuatu (14)
- Wales (175)
- Zambia (22)

== Sports ==
There were 272 medal events in 21 disciplines across 17 sports in the 2010 Commonwealth Games.

- Aquatics
  - Diving
  - Swimming
  - Synchronised swimming
- Archery (8)
- Athletics (46)
- Badminton (6)
- Boxing (10)
- Cycling
  - Road
  - Track
- Gymnastics
  - Artistic gymnastics
  - Rhythmic gymnastics
- Field hockey (2)
- Lawn bowls (6)
- Netball (1)
- Rugby sevens (1)
- Shooting (44)
- Squash (5)
- Table tennis (7)
- Tennis (5)
- Weightlifting (15)
- Wrestling (21)

Kabaddi was a demonstration sport at the Games. Triathlon was excluded from the Games as there was no suitable location to conduct the swimming stage of the competition. Basketball was excluded, while archery, tennis, and wrestling, which were not contested in the 2006 Commonwealth Games, made a comeback. Despite popular demand, Cricket was not included, as the Board of Control for Cricket in India were not keen on a Twenty20 tournament, and the Games organisers did not want a one day tournament.

== Calendar ==
OC	Opening ceremony	●	Event competitions	1	Gold medal events	CC	Closing ceremony

October		3 Sun	4 Mon	5 Tue	6 Wed	7 Thu	8 Fri	9 Sat	10 Sun	11 Mon	12 Tue	13 Wed	14 Thu	Events
Ceremonies		OC											CC	—N/a
Archery			●	●	●	2	2	2	2					8
Athletics					2	7	8	9	8	7	9		2	52
Badminton			●	●	●	●	1	●	●	●	●	●	5	6
Boxing				●	●	●	●	●	●	●		10		10
Cycling	Road cycling								2			2		4
Cycling	Track cycling			3	4	4	3							14
Diving									3	2	3	2		10
Gymnastics	Artistic		1	1	2	5	5							14
Gymnastics	Rhythmic										1	1	4	6
Hockey			●	●	●	●	●	●	●	●	●	1	1	2
Lawn bowls			●	●	●	●	●	●	2	2	●	2		6
Netball			●	●	●	●	●	●	●	●	●		1	1
Rugby sevens										●	1			1
Shooting			●	4	4	4	5	4	3	2	4	6		36
Squash			●	●	●	●	2			●	●	3		5
Swimming			5	5	9	5	11	9						44
Synchronised swimming					●	2								2
Table tennis			●	●	●	●	1	1	●	●	1	2	3	8
Tennis			●	●	●	●	●	2	3					5
Weightlifting			2	2	2	2	2	2	2	1	2			17
Wrestling				3	4	4	3	3	4					21
Daily medal events			8	18	27	35	43	32	29	14	21	29	16	272
Cumulative total			8	26	53	88	131	163	192	206	227	256	272	272
October		3 Sun	4 Mon	5 Tue	6 Wed	7 Thu	8 Fri	9 Sat	10 Sun	11 Mon	12 Tue	13 Wed	14 Thu	Events

== Medal table ==
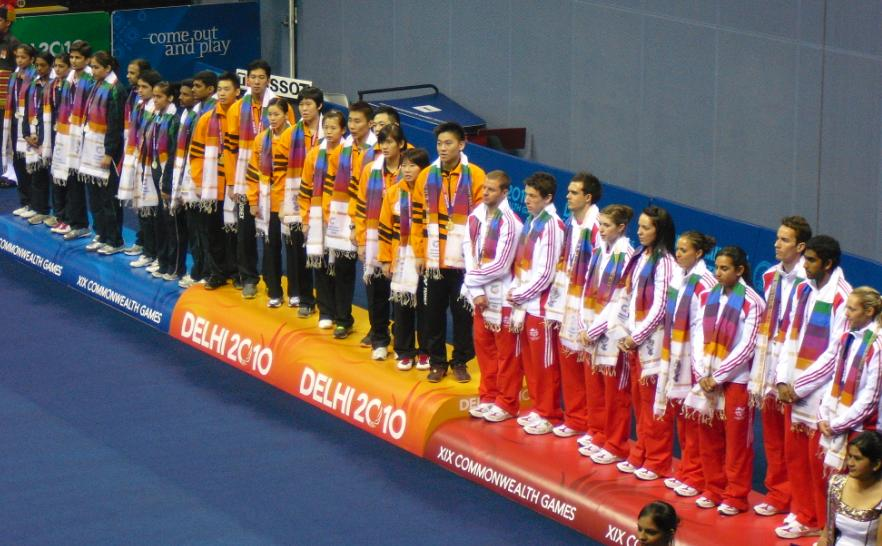
Medalists of the Badminton mixed team competition. From left: India (silver), Malaysia (gold), and England (bronze)

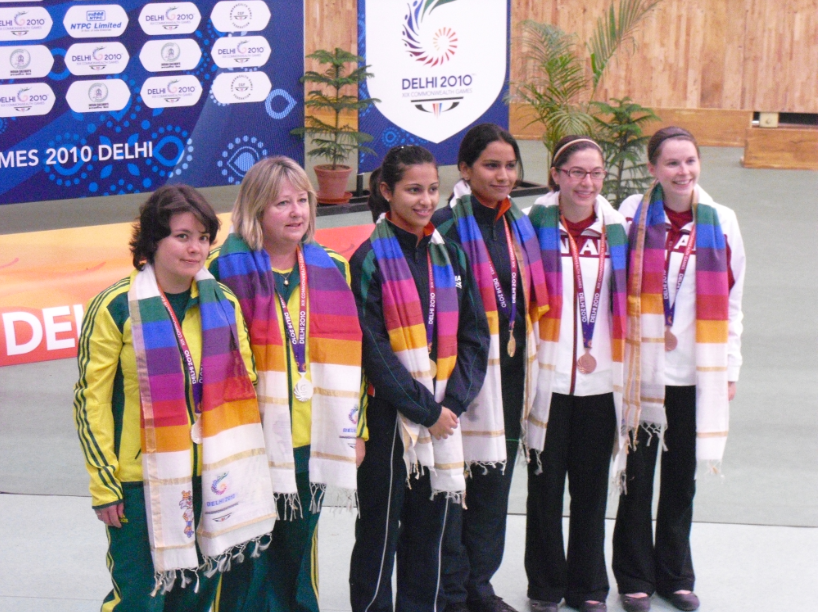
Medalists of the 10-metre air pistol pairs women. From left: Dina Aspandiyarova, Pamela McKenzie, Heena Sidhu, Annu Raj Singh, Dorothy Ludwig, and Lynda Hare

Note: Only the top ten entries are listed.

* Host nation (India)

Rank	CGA	Gold	Silver	Bronze	Total
1	Australia	74	55	48	177
2	India*	38	27	36	101
3	England	37	60	45	142
4	Canada	26	17	34	77
5	Kenya	12	11	10	33
5	South Africa	12	11	10	33
7	Malaysia	12	10	14	36
8	Singapore	11	11	9	31
9	Nigeria	11	8	14	33
10	Scotland	9	10	7	26
Totals (10 entries)		242	220	227	689

=== Podium sweeps ===
Date	Sport	Event	Team	Gold	Silver	Bronze
6 October	Swimming	Women's 200 metre breaststroke	Australia	Leisel Jones	Tessa Wallace	Sarah Katsoulis
6 October	Gymnastics	Women's artistic individual all-around	Australia	Lauren Mitchell	Emily Little	Georgia Bonora
8 October	Squash	Men's singles	England	Nick Matthew	James Willstrop	Peter Barker
8 October	Athletics	Men's 110 metres hurdles	England	Andy Turner	William Sharman	Lawrence Clarke
9 October	Athletics	Women's 3000 metres steeplechase	Kenya	Milcah Chemos Cheywa	Mercy Wanjiru Njoroge	Gladys Jerotich Kipkemoi
10 October	Athletics	Men's 800 metres	Kenya	Boaz Lalang	Richard Kiplagat	Abraham Kiplagat
11 October	Athletics	Men's 3000 metres steeplechase	Kenya	Richard Mateelong	Ezekiel Cheboi	Brimin Kipruto
11 October	Athletics	Women's discus throw	India	Krishna Poonia	Harwant Kaur	Seema Antil
12 October	Powerlifting	Women's Open bench press	Nigeria	Esther Oyema	Ganiyatu Onaolapo	Osamwenyobor Araspmwan
12 October	Powerlifting	Men's Open bench press	Nigeria	Yakubu Adesokan	Anthony Ulonnam	Ikechukwu Obichukwu
12 October	Table tennis	Women's singles	Singapore	Feng Tianwei	Yu Mengyu	Wang Yuegu
12 October	Athletics	Women's 5000 metres	Kenya	Vivian Cheruiyot	Sylvia Kibet	Ines Chenonge

== Broadcasting ==
Broadcast activities in India was provided by Prasar Bharati, in association with the production house, SIS Live.

In New Zealand, the rights were first won by TVNZ. In September 2009, it was reported that TVNZ were seeking to offload the rights to SKY TV to avoid a NZ$5 million loss in the event, and the deal was confirmed in January 2010, backed by the country's government. Although Sky is a pay television broadcaster, they still promised that the coverage would be broadcast free-to-air.

Territory	Broadcaster	Ref
Asia	APBU	
Australia	Network Ten; Foxtel; ABC Local Radio	
Canada	CBC	
Caribbean	CMC	
Cyprus	CyBC	
Europe	EBU	
India	All India Radio; Doordarshan	
Malaysia	RTM; Astro	
Namibia	nbc	
New Zealand	SKY TV; Prime	
Nigeria	BON	
Pacific Islands	SKY TV; Prime	
Papua New Guinea	SKY TV; Prime	
Seychelles	SBC	
Singapore	MediaCorp	
South Africa	SABC; SuperSport	
Sub-Saharan Africa	SABC; SuperSport	
Tanzania	TBC	
United Kingdom	BBC	
United States	Video Sound Inc.	

== Marketing ==
=== Logo and mascot ===
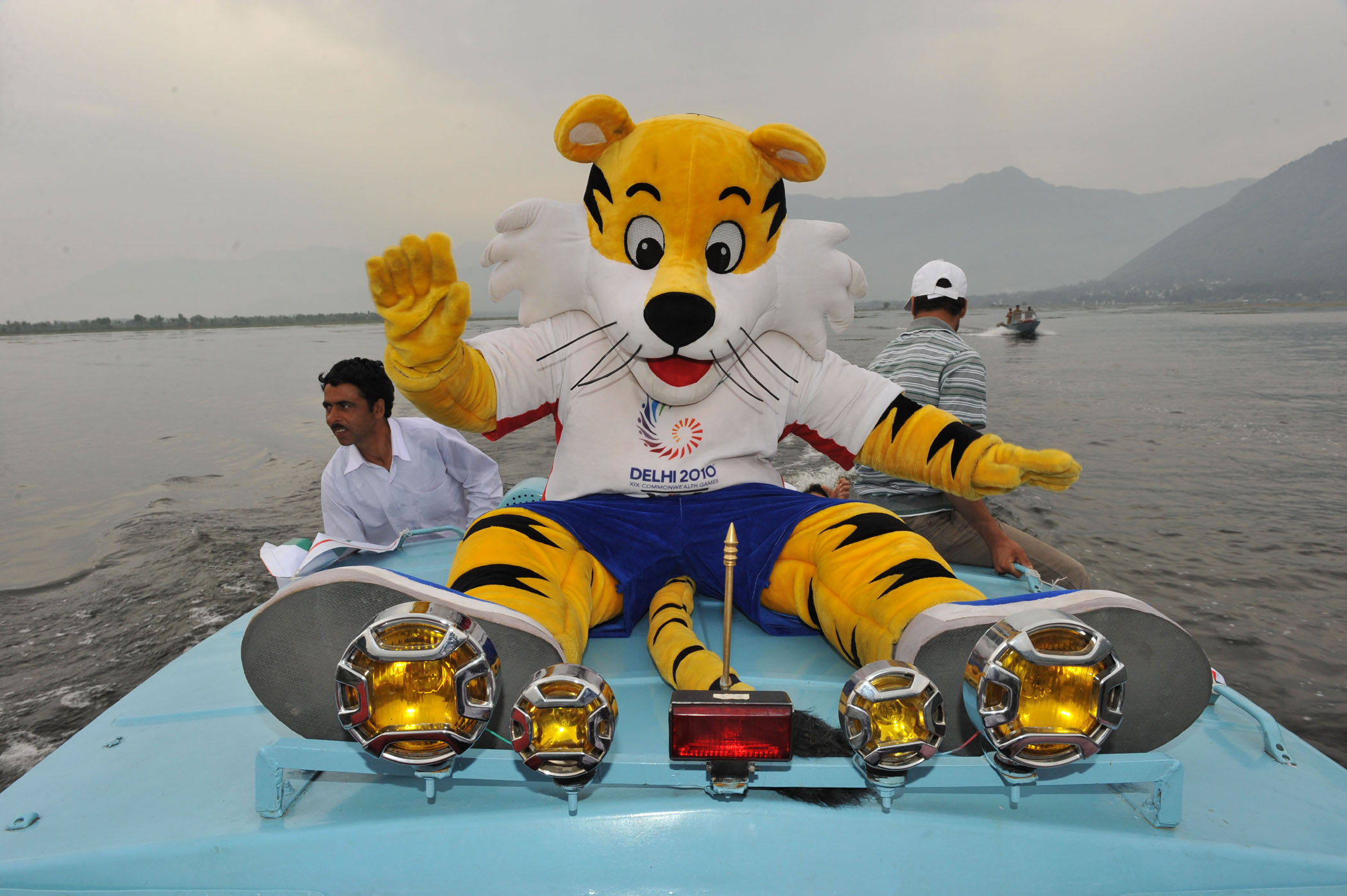
Shera, the mascot of the 2010 Commonwealth Games

The official mascot for the 2010 Commonwealth Games was Shera, an anthropomorphised tiger. The name comes from the Hindi word "Sher", colloquially used to represent the tiger. As per the organizing committee, tiger is associated with Shakti, the universal power, in Hindu mythology and the mascot represented the values of majesty, power, charisma, intelligence and grace.

The logo of the 2010 Commonwealth Games consists is derived from the image of the Ashoka Chakra, India's national symbol, which denotes freedom, unity, power and progress. There are several silhouettes of the figures spiralling upwards from the Chakra, which represented the growth of India into a vibrant nation and the motto of the Games. The logo used six colours–green, red, yellow, blue, purple, and pink. As per the organizing committee, green represented life, energy, high spirits, the designation of the 2010 games as a green games, and determination in overcoming challenges, purple represented reassurance, mystery, and excitement, red represented unity, yellow represents destiny, blue represented equality, and pink represented luxury, and surprise. The logo was designed by Idiom Design and Consulting.

The tagline of the 2010 Commonwealth Games was "Come out and play". As per the organizing committee, it was chosen as an invitation to the athletes from the Commonwealth member countries to participate in the games and to call the Indian people to support their country's hosting of the games.

=== Sponsors ===
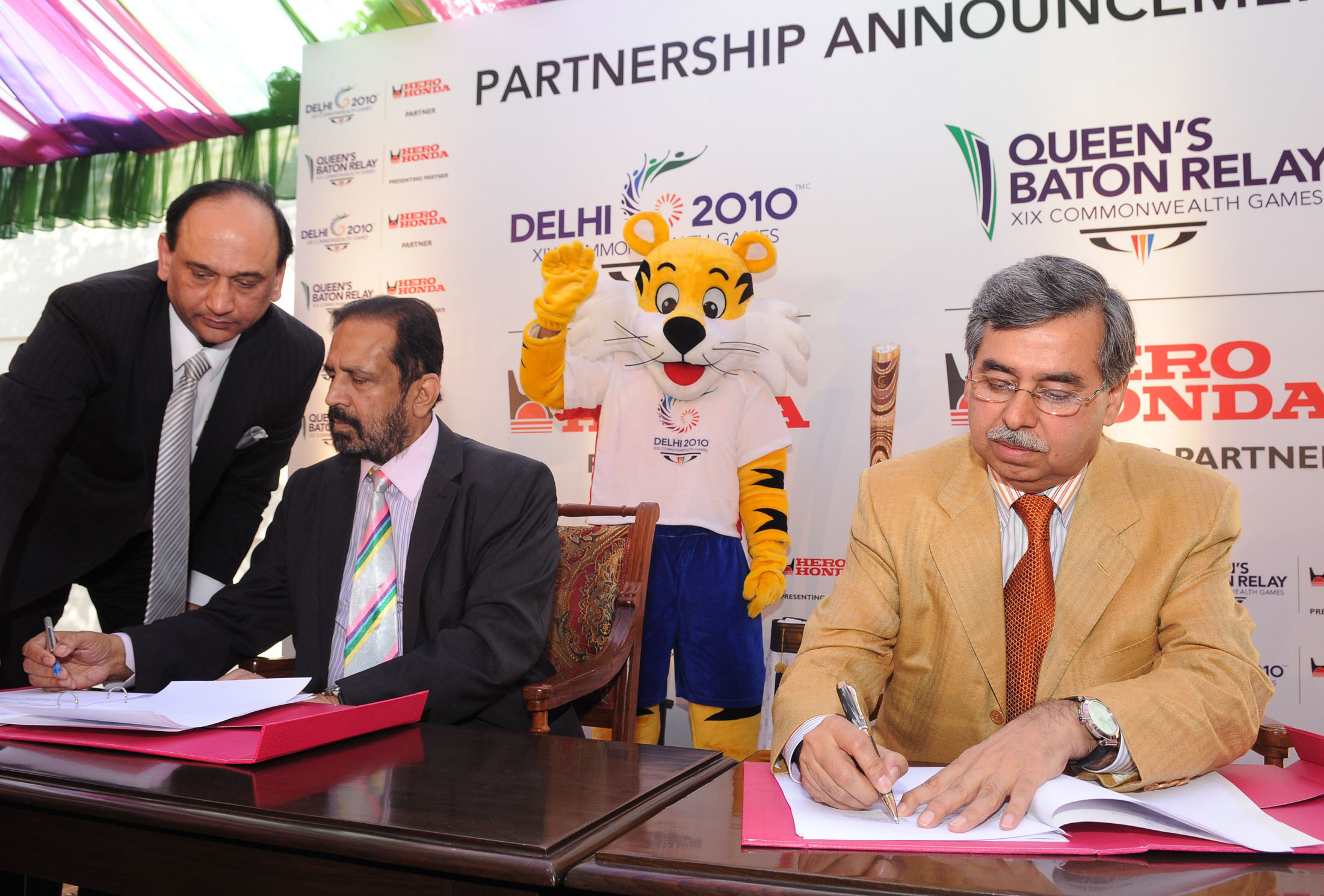
Suresh Kalmadi, chairman of the Organising Committee and Pawan Munjal, MD of Hero Honda signing an agreement

Indian Railways served as the lead partner for the 2010 Commonwealth Games. Central Bank of India, Air India, and NTPC Limited served as the official banking, airline, and power partners for the Games respectively. Hero Honda signed on as the official motorcycle partner and the presenting partner of the Queen's Baton Relay. Tata Motors served as the transport partner for the Queen's Baton Relay. Swiss watchmaker Tissot was the official timekeeper of the Games. Other partners included Coca-Cola, Amity University, Reebok, and Agility Logistics.

=== Official song ===
The official song of the 2010 Commonwealth Games Jiyo Utho Badho Jeeto, composed and performed by A. R. Rahman, was released on 28 August 2010. However, as the 4:16 minute song received poor response from the public, a shorter version, running for half of the original time, was released in September 2010.

== Concerns and controversies ==
Concerns were raised over the preparations for the Games due to delay in construction of the main Games' venues. In mid-2009, an India government report cited critical delays in the works being carried out and that two-thirds of the sporting venues were not ready. CGF president Mike Fennell stated that the slow progress of preparations represented a serious risk to the event. Randhir Singh, the secretary-general of the IOA, agreed that there were delays, and the various committees formed to look into the various aspects of the preparations for the Games, were not functioning efficiently. He called for the reconstitution of the committees, and expressed confidence that the work would be completed in time for the Games.

In the lead up to the Games, an estimated 100,000 people were displaced from their homes, as many of them were demolished, in a beautification drive carried out by the authorities. There were protests against the ecological impact of the Games including felling of trees. A public interest litigation was filed in the Supreme Court of India against the felling of 'heritage' trees in the Siri Fort area to make way for Games facilities. The court appointed architect Charles Correa to assess the impact, and he severely criticised the designs on ecological grounds. However, in April 2009, the Supreme Court allowed the construction to continue on the grounds that time had already been lost and irreversible damage had already been done. While the ineffectiveness and incompetence of Suresh Kalmadi, the head of the Games Organizing Committee, and his aide, Lalit Bhanot, was cited by various media, some sections of the media were accused of bias, unfair expectations, and negative reporting on the Games.

The Commonwealth Games village was located on the flood plains of the Yamuna River, and concerns were raised regarding the flouting of ecological norms. After a legal battle, in July 2009, the Supreme Court allowed the construction to continue, and held that the government had satisfied the requirements of law as it had issued public notice of its intention to begin construction work in September 1999 itself. There were concerns on the likelihood of rains during the Games, infrastructural compromise, and poor living conditions at the Games Village. There was also concerns of a possibility of a terrorist attack during the closing ceremony of the Games. There was extensive cost overrun, and possible compromise of infrastructure due to corruption by officials of the Games' Organising Committee.

After the conclusion of the Games, the Indian government announced the formation of a special committee to probe into the allegations of corruption and mismanagement against the Organising Committee, in addition to separate investigations by the Central Bureau of Investigation, Enforcement Directorate, and Central Vigilance Commission, that were already underway. The committee was to submit its report within the next three months.

== Legacy ==
The opening ceremony was acclaimed and improved the image of the Games. The President of the International Olympic Committee, Jacques Rogge, said that India had made a good foundation for a future Olympics bid, which was reiterated by the Australian Minister of Sports. The CGF chief Mike Fennell stated that Delhi delivered a "fantastic Games". A day after the closing ceremony, Scotland's First Minister Alex Salmond stated that, "Scotland is highly impressed with Delhi's success in holding the multi-sport event, Delhi hosted a very successful Commonwealth Games. It will be a challenge to emulate". While in the build up to the Games, it had several negative notions surrounding them, Australian Olympic Committee remarked that, while it was initially apprehensive, the athletes had an exceptional experience and the Games had a largely positive ending.

Gordon Farquhar, writing for BBC Sport, believed that, while India had developed world-class sporting infrastructure at Delhi for hosting the Commonwealth Games, and Indian athletes achieved several records during the Games, it was up to the Indian government to support building a sporting culture beyond cricket, given that India had only won its first ever individual Olympic gold medal at the 2008 games despite having the world's second-largest population. Sebastian Coe, former Olympic gold medalist and the chairman of the 2012 Summer Olympics Organising Committee, who was at the stadium during the 4 × 400 metre women's relay, which was won by India, described the audience's cheers for the racers as "potentially the moment that could change the course of athletics in Asia, the moment that could inspire thousands of people who'd never even seen an athletics track before to get involved".

== See also ==
- 2008 Commonwealth Youth Games – Youth sporting event in India
- 2030 Commonwealth Games – Upcoming multi-sport event in Ahmedabad, India

Preceded by Melbourne	Commonwealth Games; Delhi; XIX Commonwealth Games	Succeeded by Glasgow
