= Dr. Karni Singh Shooting Range =

Shooting range in New Delhi, India

Coordinates: 28.499759°N 77.266835°E

Dr. Karni Singh Shooting Range is a shooting range in New Delhi, India. Spread over 72 acres, it is situated on South Delhi ridges in the backdrop of Adilabad Fort, near the historic Tughlaqabad Fort to its North and Surajkund Lake to its South West. It was first constructed for the 1982 Asian Games in New Delhi, and later rebuilt altogether for the 2010 Commonwealth Games. It was named after Dr. Maharaja Karni Singh Ji, the last Maharaja of the erstwhile princely kingdom of Bikaner, who won the silver medal at the 38th World Shooting Championships at Cairo in 1962 and was the first shooter to be awarded the Arjuna Award in 1961. The reconstruction work started on 25 October 2008 and was completed at a cost of Rs. 150 crore in 13 months. It was dedicated to the nation on 31 January 2010 by Union Minister for Youth Affairs & Sports.

== Overview ==
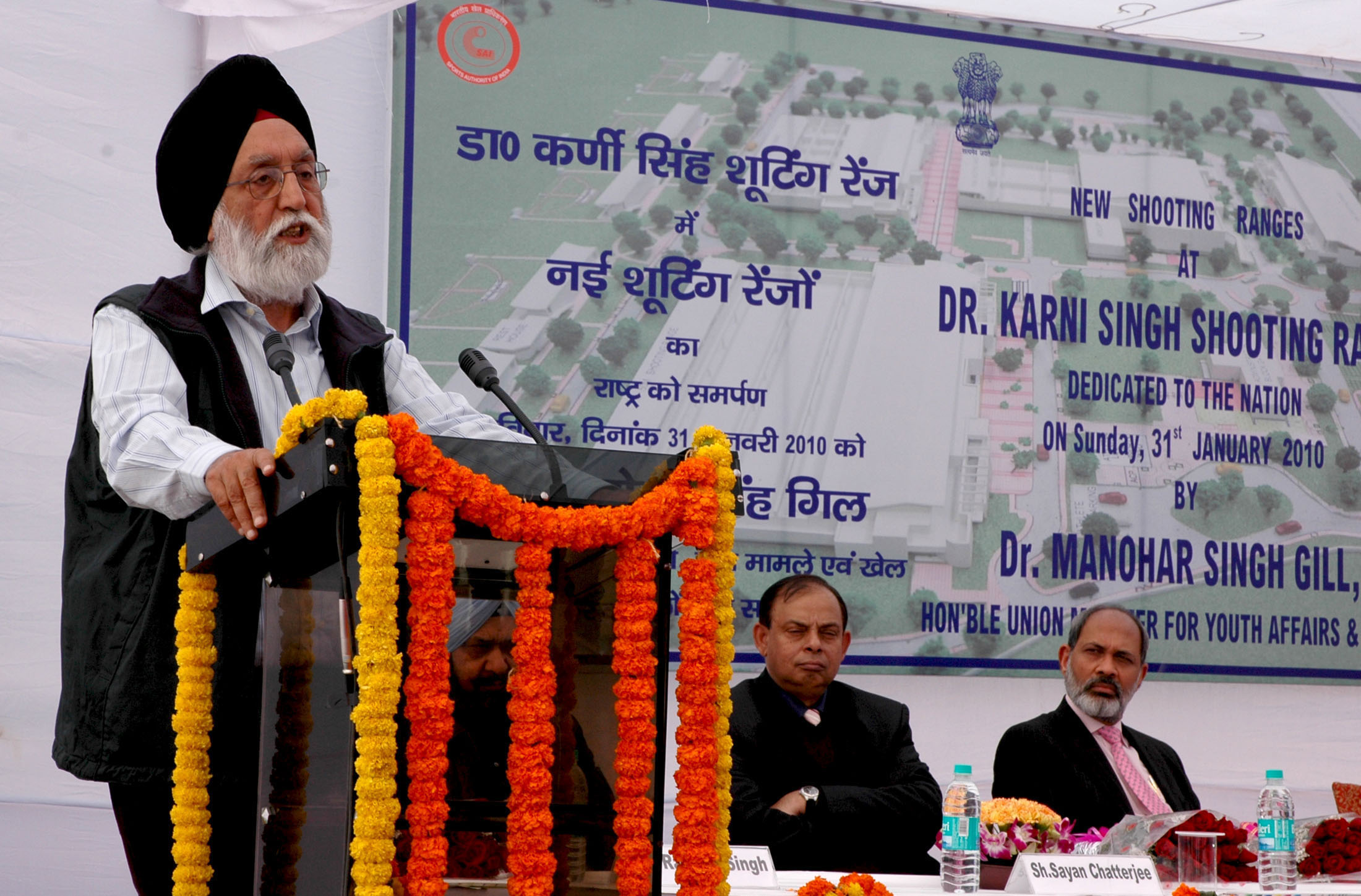
The Union Minister of Youth Affairs and Sports, M. S. Gill, addressing the dedication ceremony of new shooting ranges at Dr. Karni Singh Shooting Range in New Delhi, January 31, 2010.

In October 2008 the structure of the range was fully demolished and was built under a project a plan costing Rs. 150 crore (U$33.8 m), it was completed in 13 months. Spread over 72 acres (290,000 m^{2}), the Range has been divided into six parts – a 10-metre range, a 25-metre range, a 50-metre range, a final range, trap and skeet range and a new armoury building which were constructed with state-of-the-art technology . The earlier separate ranges for Trap and Skeet were converted into new composite ranges for Trap and Skeet with scoring equipment.

For the 10-metre shooting range, a centrally air-conditioned indoor facility with complete power back-up was constructed with a capacity of maximum of 500 spectators. Two different grids will be providing electricity to ensure complete power back-up.

The trap and skeet range is an outdoor venue with only the seating area covered; the shooter though has shade on his head. There are 50 firing points for this range.

The rebuilding of the site was followed by massive plantation and beautification would to make the site more attractive. There are also plans for constructing a 200-seated hostel which will be a self-contained facility to help the campers.

It is regarded as one of the world's best shooting range by various 2010 Commonwealth Games shooters., also near by is the Asola Bhatti Wildlife Sanctuary.

== Notable hosted events ==
The range has hosted several international shooting competitions over the years. In 1997 it hosted the second South Asian Shooting Championship and was a venue for the 2010 Commonwealth Games shooting events.

In October 2017, a new 10-metre Rifle and Pistol Mini Range was inaugurated by the Union Minister of State for Youth Affairs and Sports, Vijay Goel, and the Minister of State for Information and Broadcasting, Rajyavardhan Singh Rathore, to provide entry-level training infrastructure for new shooters.

In October 2024, the range hosted the season-ending ISSF World Cup Final Rifle/Pistol/Shotgun New Delhi 2024, held from 15 to 17 October. The event drew 131 of the world's top shooters from 37 nations across all 12 individual Olympic shooting events, with a 23-member Indian contingent including nine athletes from the Paris 2024 Olympics team.

The range subsequently hosted the 2025 ISSF Junior World Cup Rifle/Pistol/Shotgun New Delhi 2025 from 24 September to 2 October 2025 — the 11th edition of the Junior World Cup series and the first to be held in India. The event featured 208 shooters from 19 national federations and a 69-member Indian contingent.

The International Shooting Sport Federation has further awarded New Delhi hosting rights for an ISSF World Cup leg in 2026, the combined ISSF World Cup in 2027, and the combined ISSF Junior World Championships in 2028, with the Dr. Karni Singh Shooting Range expected to be the venue.
