= 2010 Commonwealth Games closing ceremony =

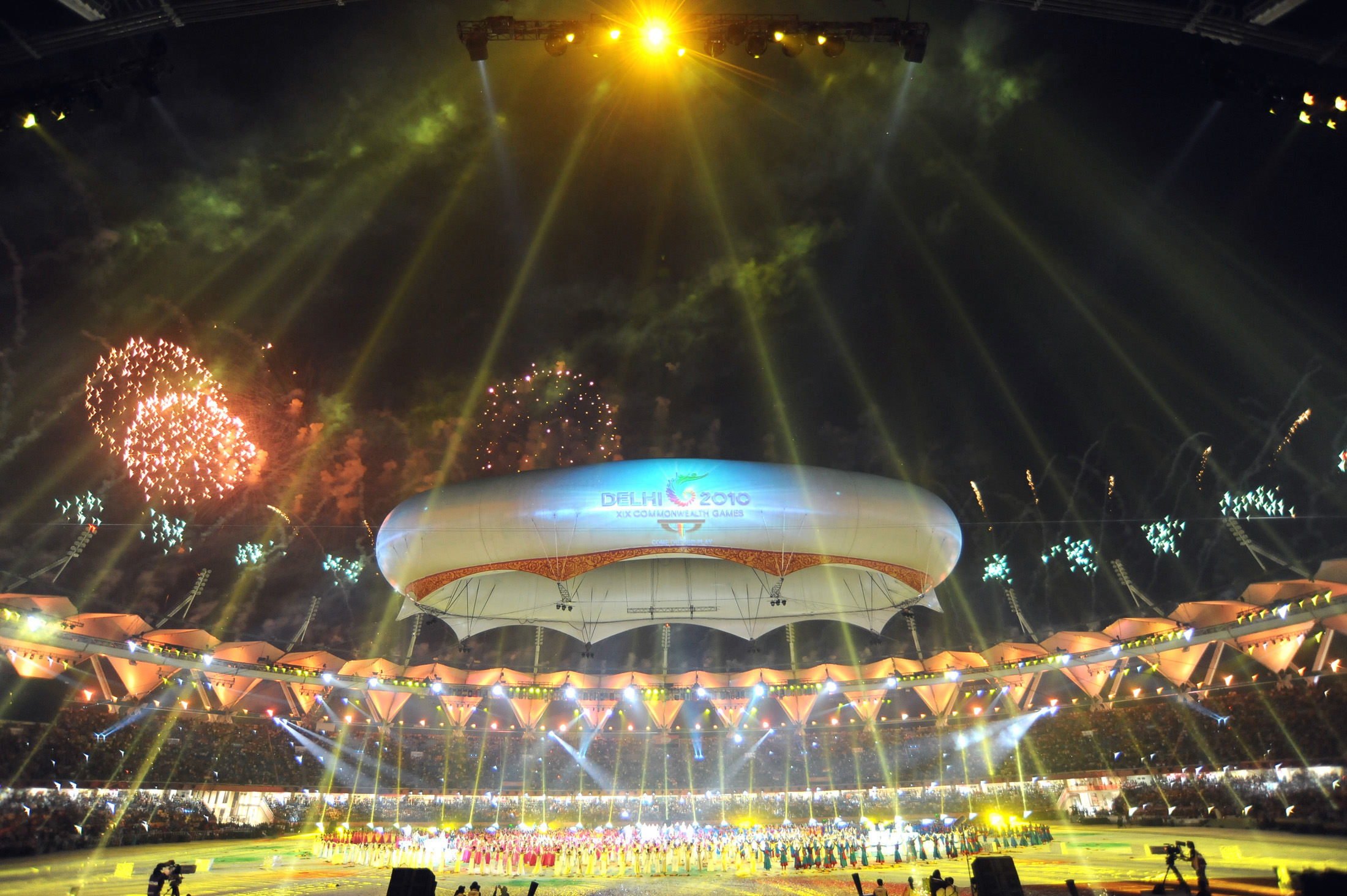
- Final Fireworks of the closing ceremony
- Date: 14 October 2010
- Time: 19:00 – 21:20 IST
- Location: Delhi, India; 28°34′58″N 77°14′4″E
- Filmed by: DD

The closing ceremony of the 2010 Commonwealth Games was held at the Jawaharlal Nehru Stadium, the main stadium of the event, in New Delhi, India. It began at 7:00 pm (IST) on 14 October 2010 and ended at 9:20 pm (IST). The ceremony included display of martial arts from a number of states of India followed by musical performances and showcasing the culture of Scotland, which will host the 2014 Commonwealth Games in Glasgow.

== Sequence of events ==
=== Anthem ===
Indian national anthem "Jana Gana Mana" was played in the Jawaharlal Nehru stadium.

=== Countdown ===
The ceremony began with a countdown at the screen starting at 18, footage from previous games appeared with Delhi at the end complete with an image of fireworks with numbers between 18 and 1 being from previous games until 0 from currents games

- 18 - 1930 Hamilton
- 17 - 1934 London
- 16 - 1938 Sydney
- 15 - 1950 Auckland
- 14 - 1954 Vancouver
- 13 - 1958 Cardiff
- 12 - 1962 Perth
- 11 - 1966 Kingston
- 10 - 1970 Edinburgh
- 9 - 1974 Christchurch
- 8 - 1978 Edmonton
- 7 - 1982 Brisbane
- 6 - 1986 Edinburgh
- 5 - 1990 Auckland
- 4 - 1994 Victoria
- 3 - 1998 Kuala Lumpur
- 2 - 2002 Manchester
- 1 - 2006 Melbourne

=== Agni ===
The cultural programme began with a segment titled Agni, in which skills in eight Indian martial arts forms: Kalaripayattu, Naga warriors, Thangta, Gatka, Silambam, Akhara, Dhan Patta, Talwar Raas were displayed by 800 performers from Kerala, Tamil Nadu, Manipur, Gujarat, Punjab, Maharashtra and Nagaland in an eight-minute act.

=== Military Martial Music and Tribute to Our Motherland' ===
The next segment was the Milatary Martial Music, which comprised the performance by the 650 musicians from fourteen military bands, 17 pipes and drums of a number of regiments and battalions of the Indian Army. It was followed by the segment Tribute to Our Motherland. It was a performance by 2,010 schoolchildren to the tunes of A. R. Rahman's composition Vande Mataram. A group of performers moved in to form the Ashoka Chakra at the centre, while the others holding coloured powder dispensers, sprinkled the colours of the Indian flag on the field, in a similar fashion done in the festival of Holi

=== Parade of the athletes ===
The athletes of the 71 participating nations entered and paraded the stadium together as one big contingent, signifying the bonds and friendships formed during the Games.

=== Farewell to Shera ===
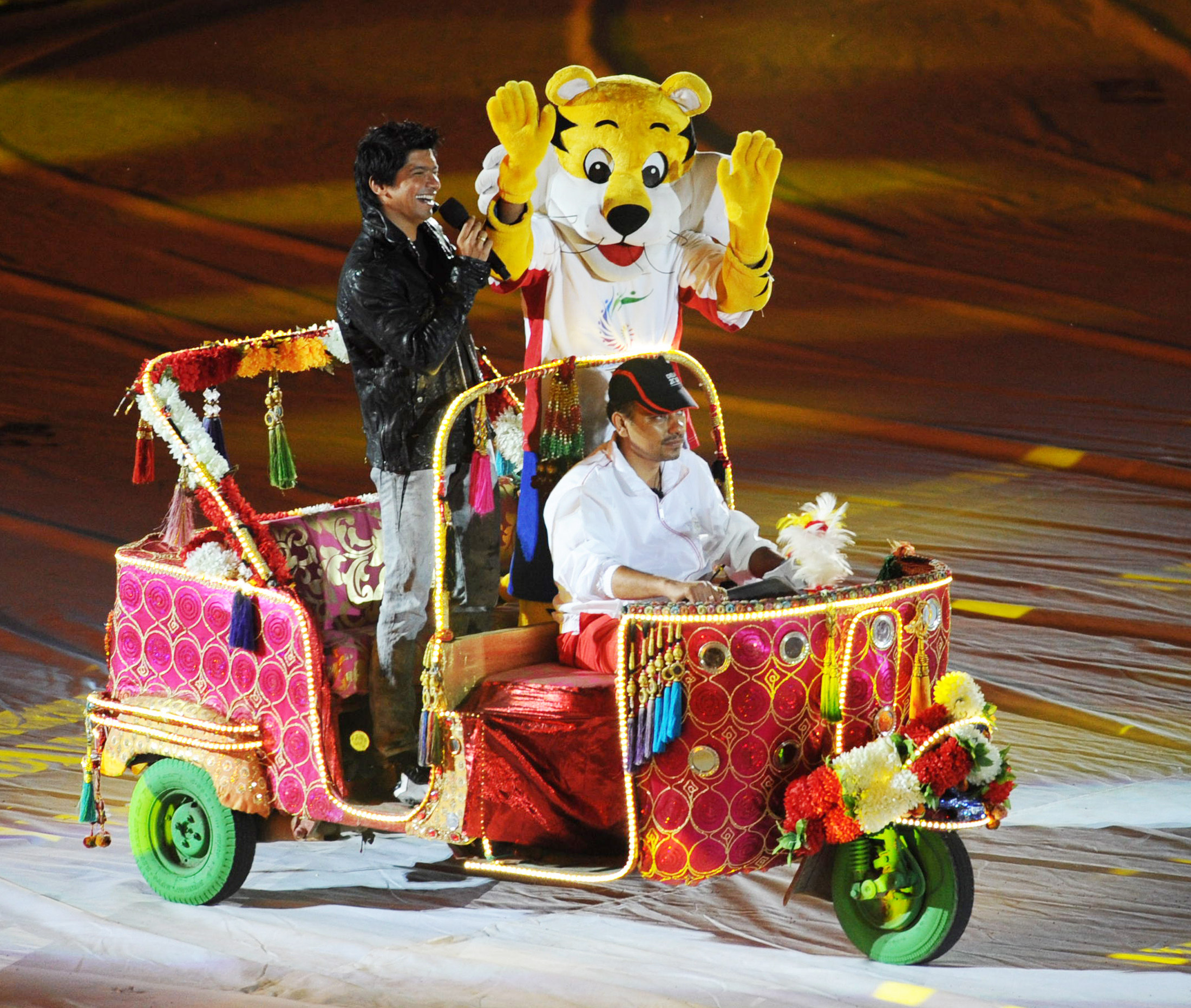
Singer Shaan and Shera perform at the closing ceremony of 2010 Commonwealth Games

The official mascot of the Games, Shera, was given a musical farewell as he went around the stadium in a vehicle accompanied by Shaan.

=== Ceremonial handover of the flag ===
The ceremonial handover of the Commonwealth Games flag segment began with the announcement by the chief minister of Delhi, Sheila Dikshit, saying, "In a few moments, the ceremonial flag will be entrusted to your care so that in due time you deliver it to Glasgow." It was followed by the acceptance of the official representative of the 2014 Commonwealth Games host city, Robert Winter, the Lord Provost of Glasgow, who replied, "This duty I willingly undertake to fulfill." Next, the Games flag was lowered with an Army band in the background. The chairman of the organising committee, Suresh Kalmadi received the flag and handed it over to the Lieutenant Governor of Delhi, Tejinder Khanna. He in turn handed over it to Robert Winter. The Flag finally passed to the Lord Smith of Kelvin. He called upon the Commonwealth nations to visit Glasgow in 2014.

=== Glasgow 2014 ===
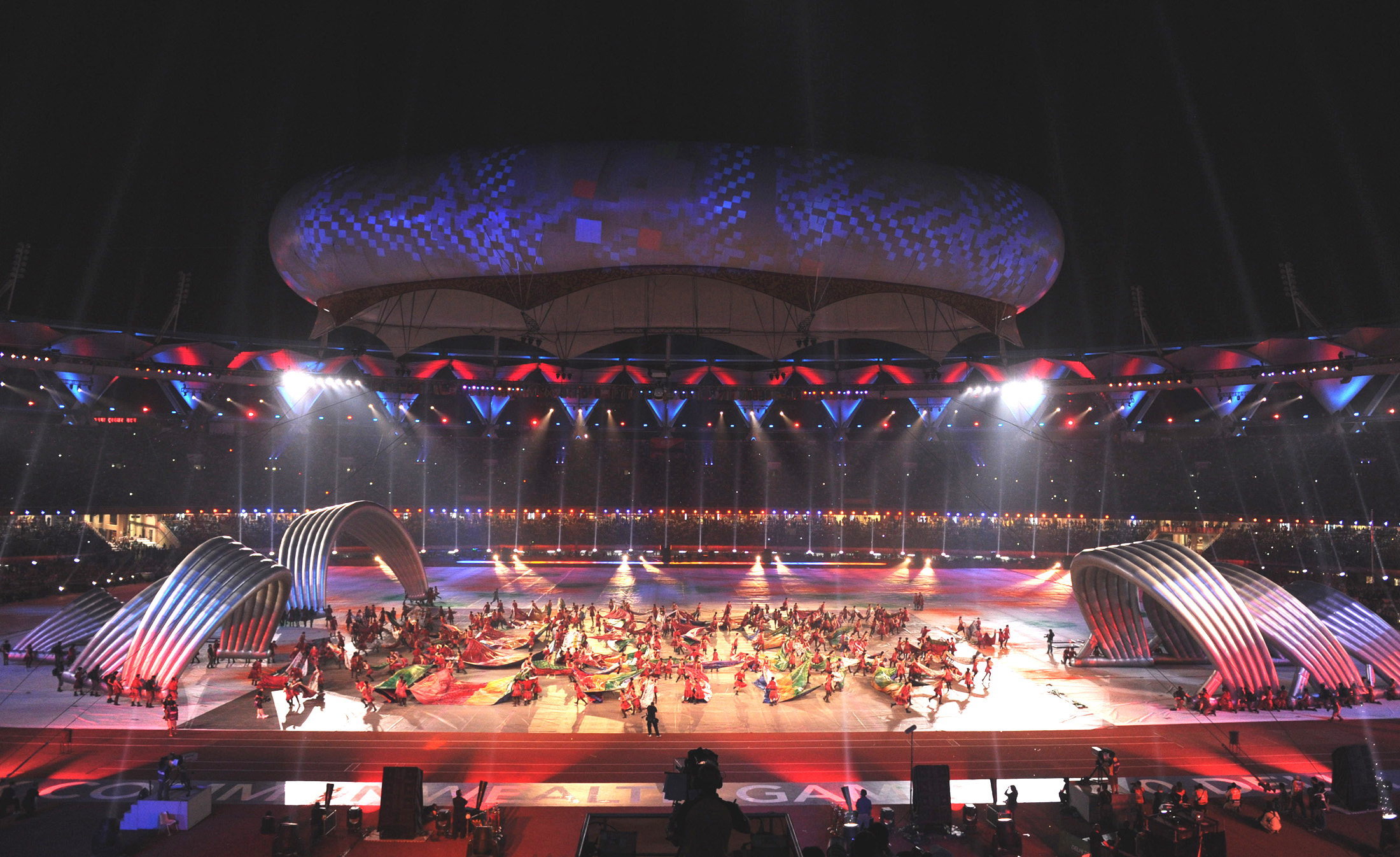
Projection of Glasgow Segment of Eight Arches shown at the closing ceremony

First a short video showcasing Scotland's landscapes, people, architecture and culture was played. Next, 352 performers from Scotland performed in a 10-minute segment displaying Scottish culture. The performance began with a lone piper dressed in the Scottish traditional dress but soon a giant structure was inflated and a scene of the Clyde Auditorium, popularly known as the Armadillo, along with the Clyde Arc Bridge and the River Clyde flowing below was depicted. The performance ended with the inflatable structure morphing into the Loch Ness Monster and the cast then exited the stadium to the tune of I'm Gonna Be (500 Miles) by The Proclaimers.

=== Closing events ===
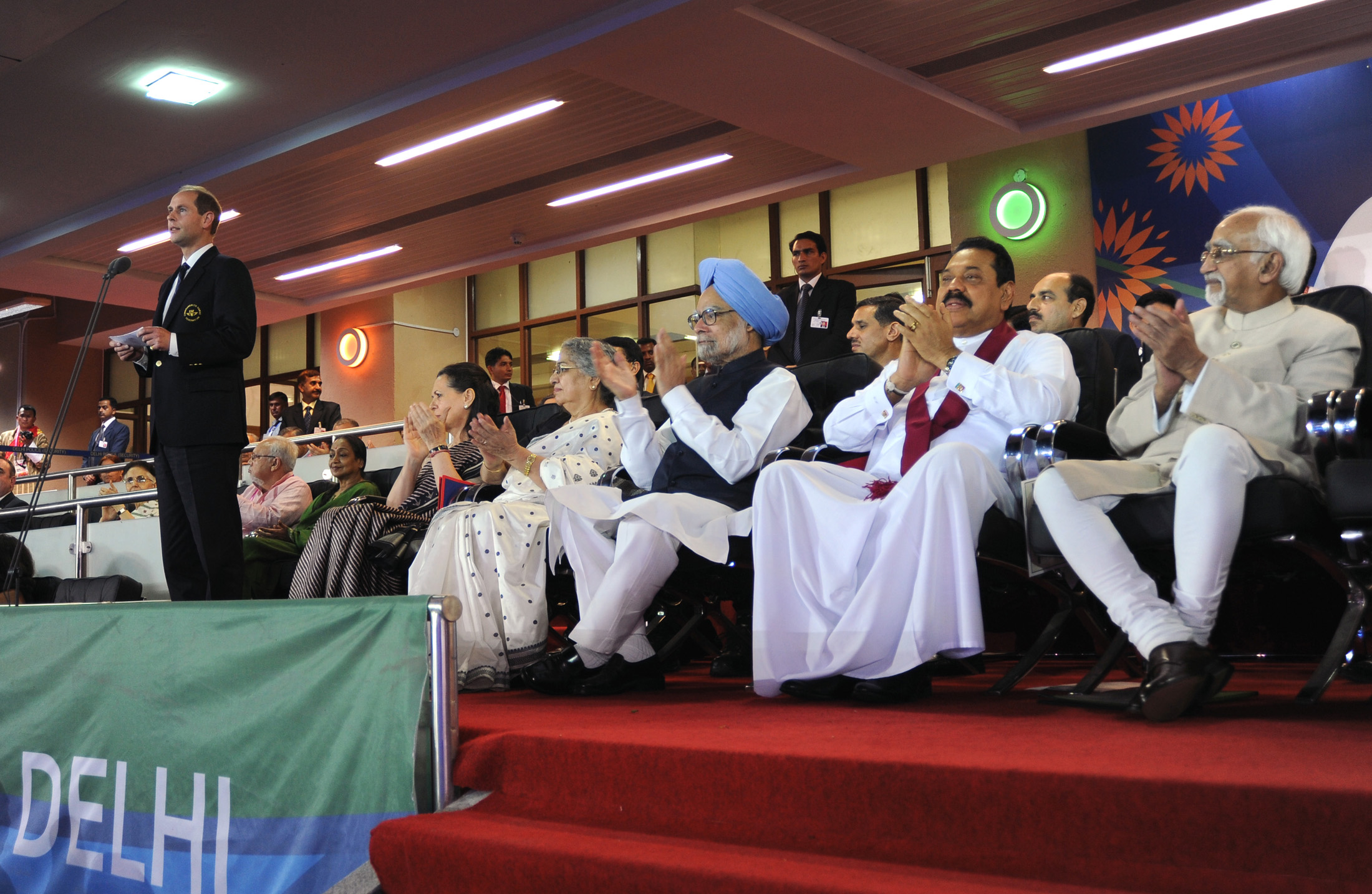
Prince Edward, Earl of Wessex addressing at the closing ceremony

Prince Edward, the vice-patron of the Commonwealth Games Federation, formally declared the 19th edition of the Commonwealth Games closed. Michael Fennell, the chairman of the CGF presented the David Dixon award to Trecia-Kaye Smith of Jamaica who won a gold medal in the women's triple jump event.

=== Universal Music of Love ===
The 30-minute segment titled the Universal Music of Love comprised Sufi, folk, Indipop and world music performances. The performers include Kailash Kher, Taufiq Qureshi, Sukhwinder Singh, Shiamak Davar, Shubha Mudgal, Shankar Mahadevan, Ila Arun, Shaan, Sunidhi Chauhan, Usha Uthup and Sreeram. About 1000 dancers also performed in this segment.

== Gallery ==
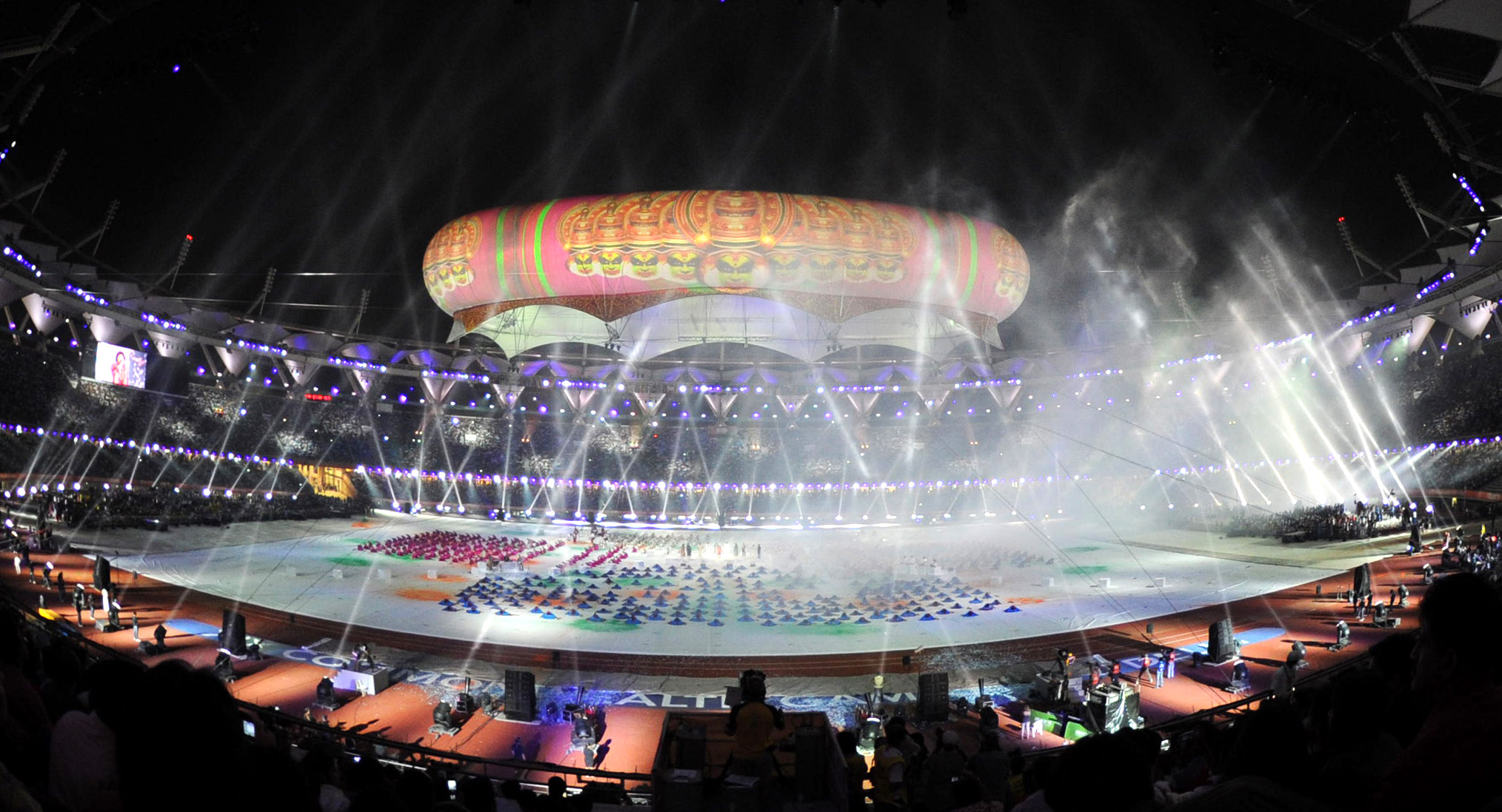
Singers' performances at the closing ceremony

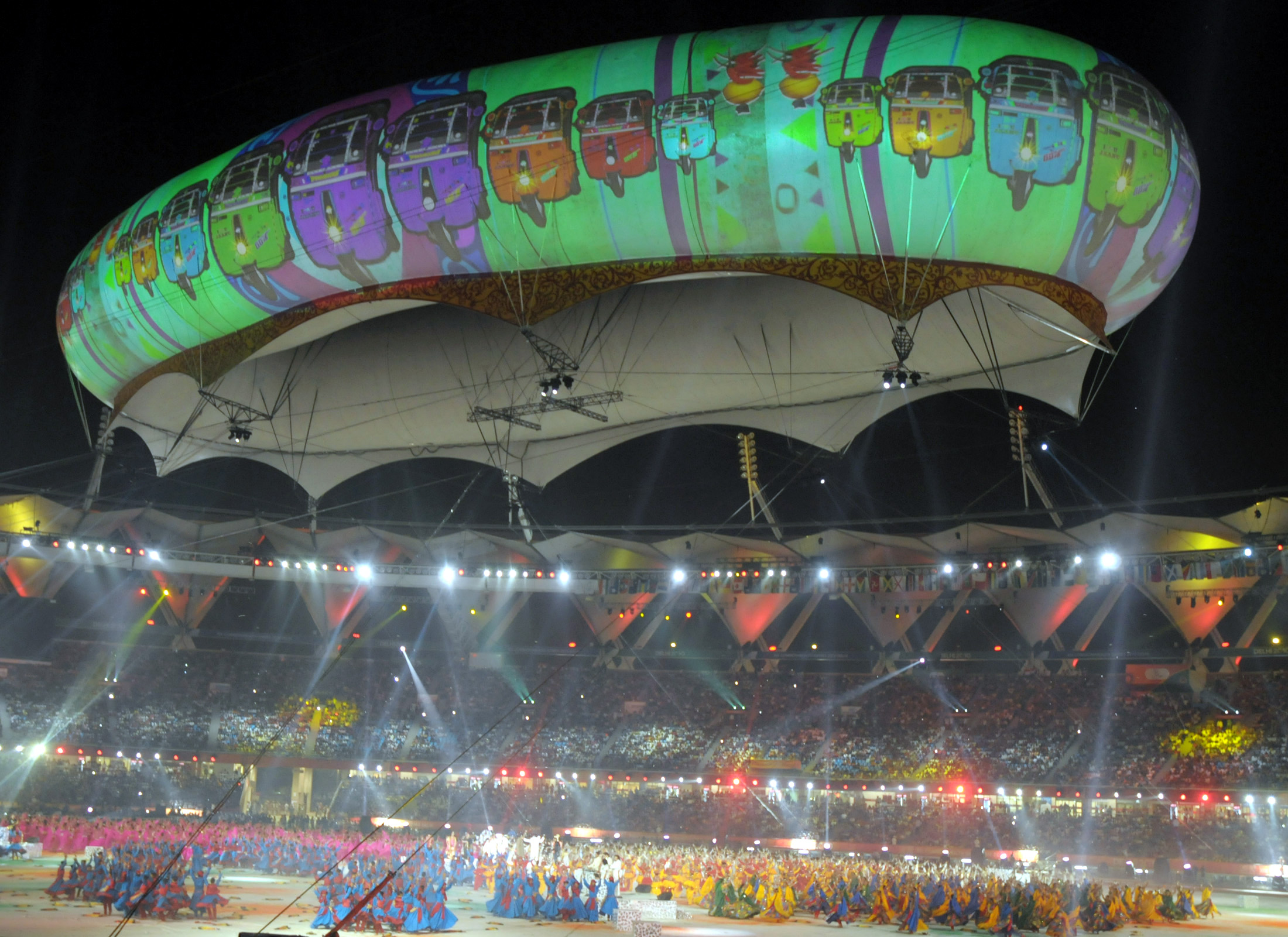
Singers' performances at the closing ceremony (Aerostat showcases Indian culture)

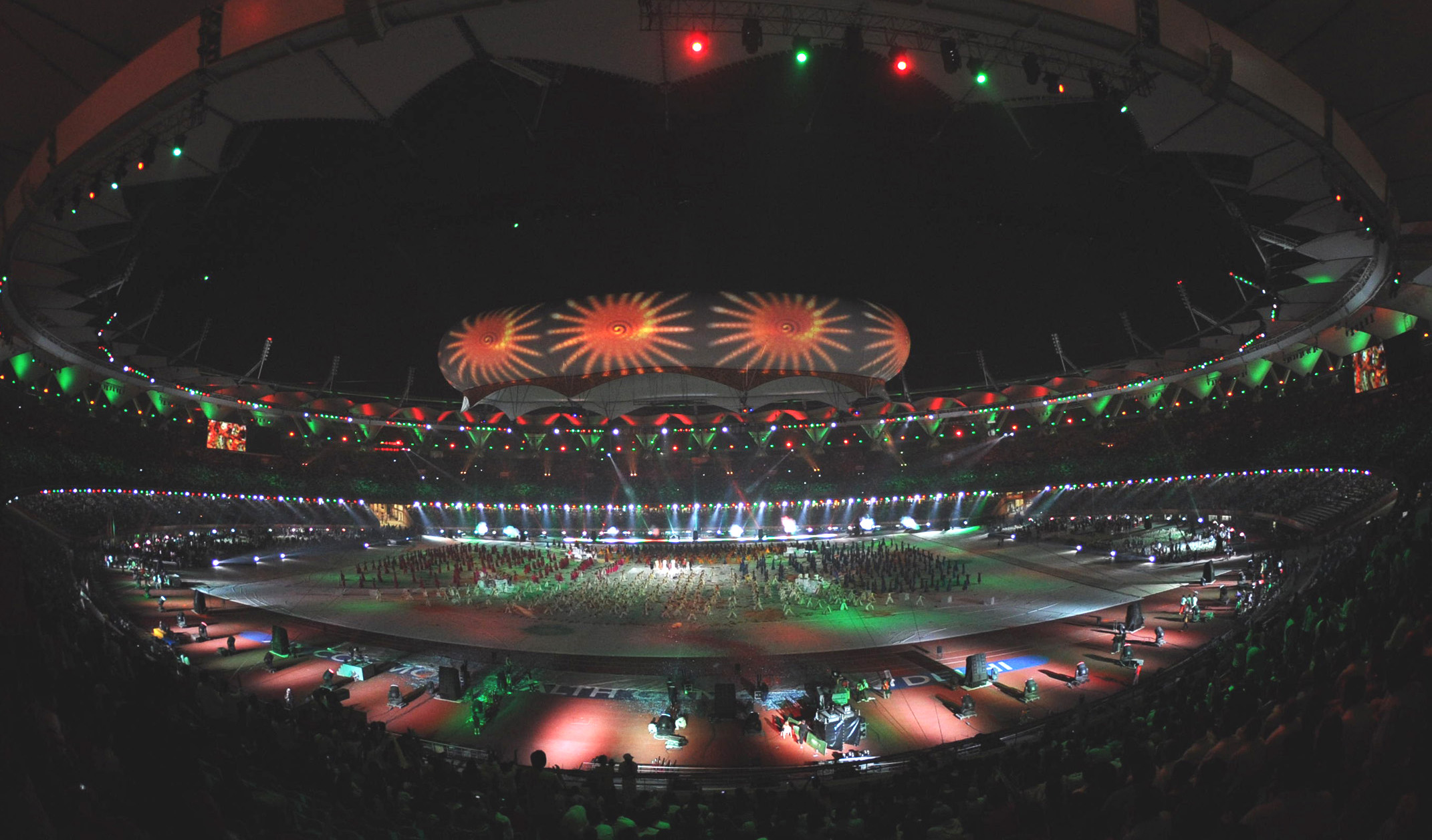
Singers' performances at the closing ceremony

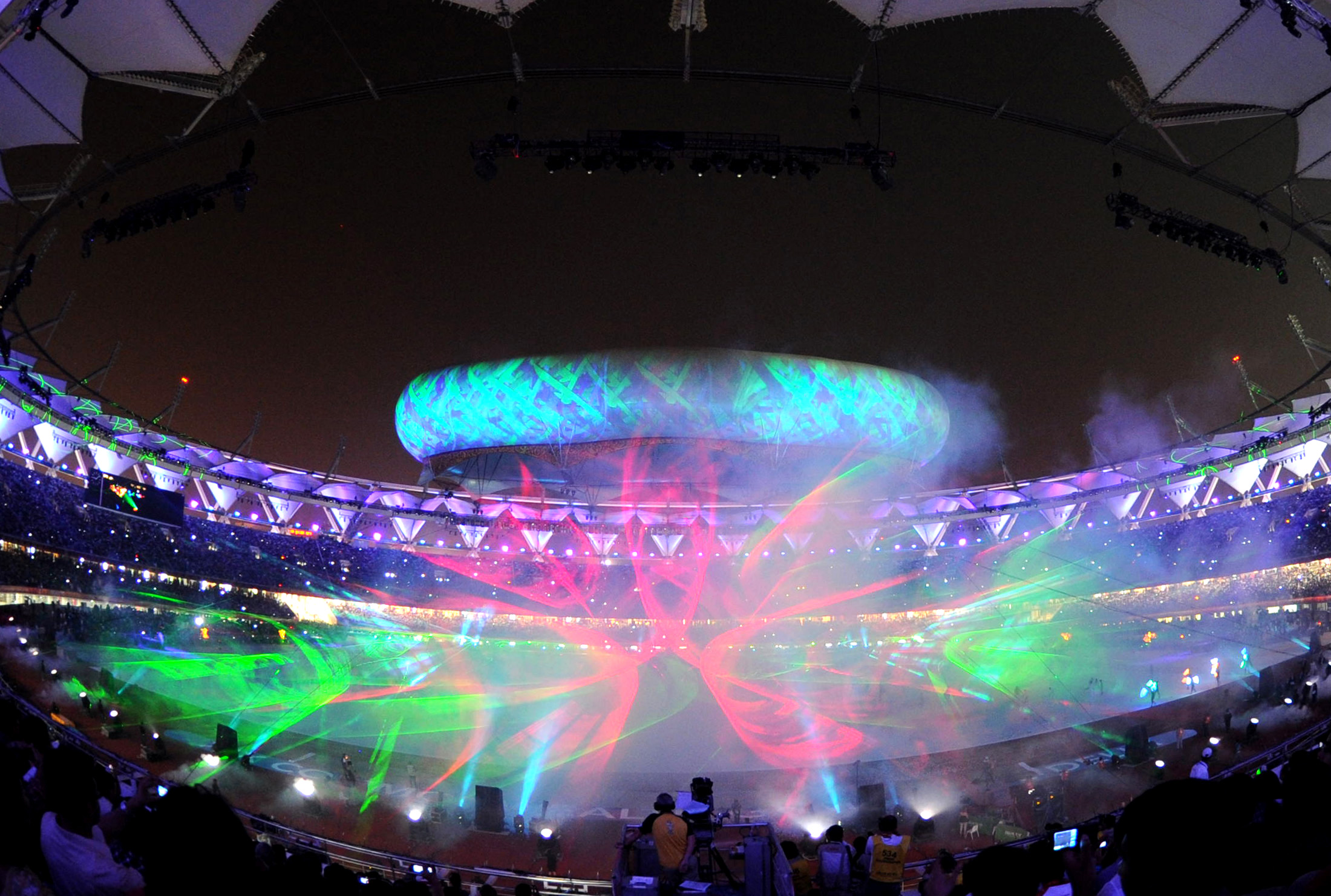
Laser light show at the closing ceremony

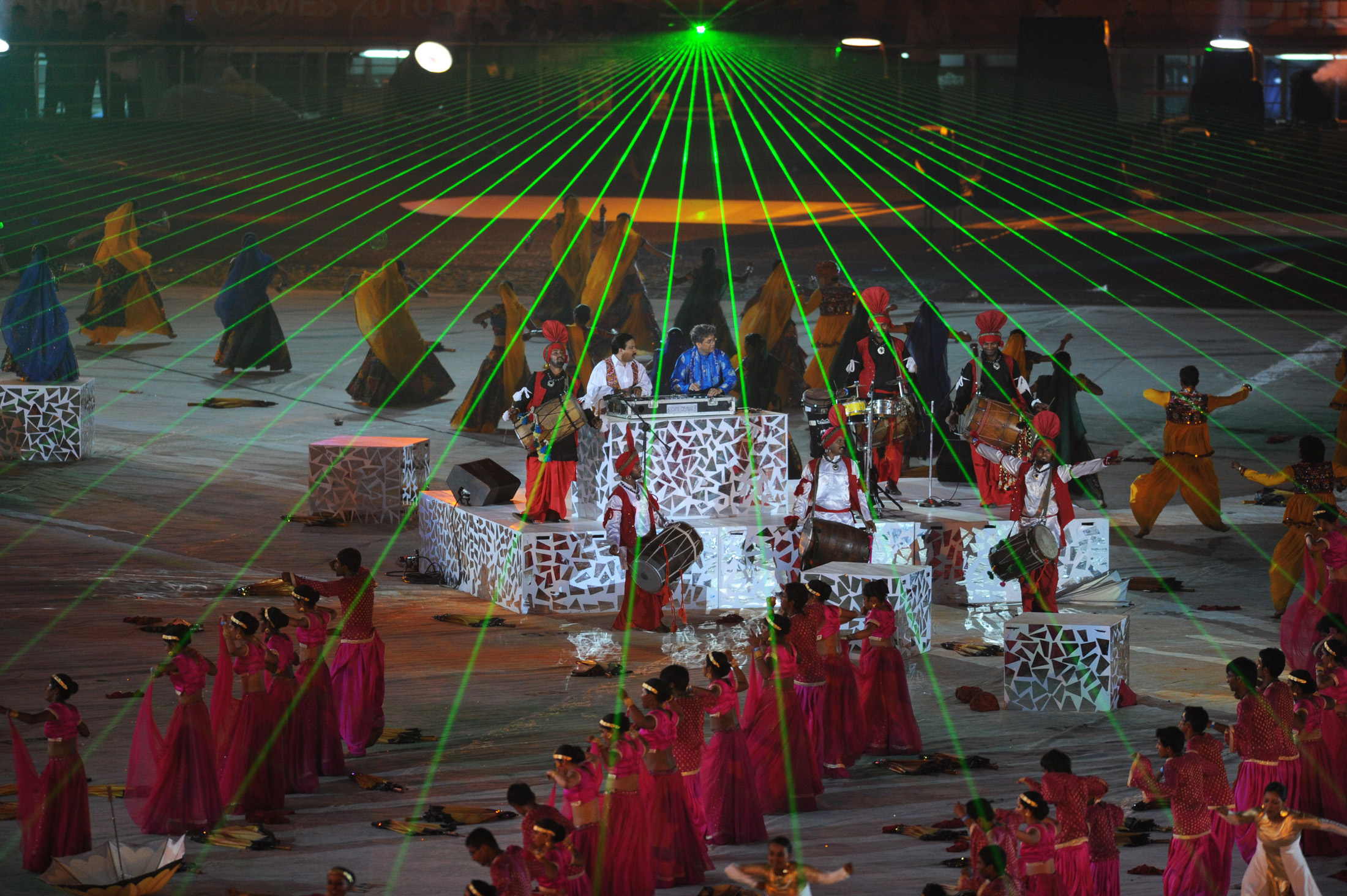
"Utho Jiyo Badho Jeeto", official song of the Games played at the closing ceremony

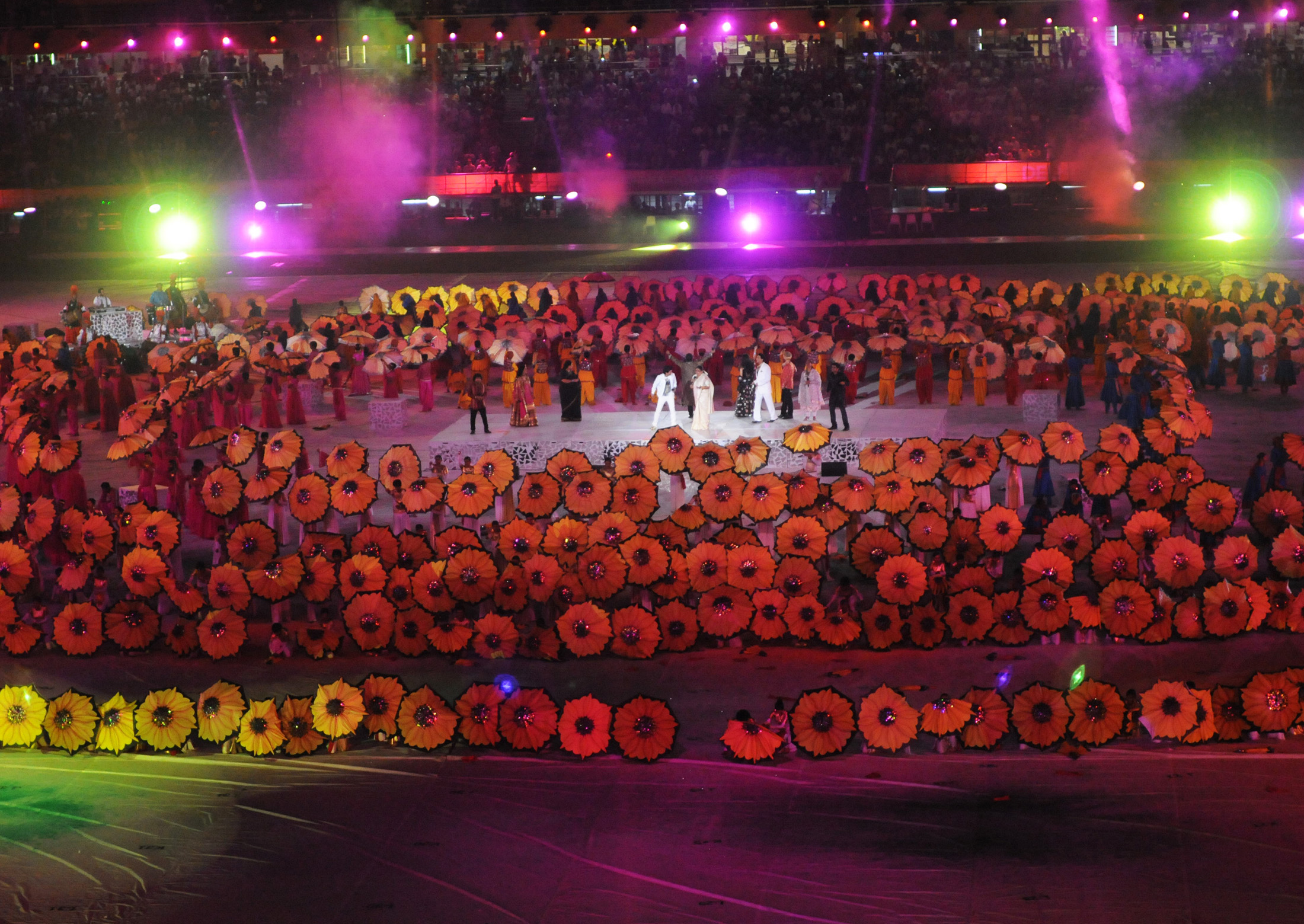
One Love song performed by the Indian singers

== Dignitaries in attendance ==
- (United Kingdom) Prince Edward, Earl of Wessex - Vice Patron of the Commonwealth Games Federation
- Michael Fennell - President of the Commonwealth Games Federation
- Manmohan Singh - Prime Minister of India
- Hamid Ansari - Vice-President of India
- (India) Sonia Gandhi - Chairperson of United Progressive Alliance
- (India) Sheila Dikshit - Chief Minister of Delhi
- (India) Tejendra Khanna - Lieutenant Governor of Delhi
- Alex Salmond - First Minister of Scotland
- (Scotland) Robert Winter - Lord Provost of Glasgow
- Mahinda Rajapaksa - President of Sri Lanka

== See also ==
- 2010 Commonwealth Games opening ceremony
