= Delhi University Stadium =

Rugby stadium in Delhi University, India

- DU Stadium
- Interactive map of Delhi University Stadium
- Full name: University of Delhi Stadium
- Location: North Campus, Delhi University, India
- Owner: Delhi University
- Operator: Delhi University
- Capacity: 2,500 permanent seats 7,500 temporary
- Executive suites: 0
- Surface: Bermuda Princess 77 Grass – 120 m x 70 m
- Scoreboard: Rs, 12.87 crore

Construction
- Groundbreaking: 2008
- Built: 2010
- Opened: 15 July 2010

Tenant
- 2010 Commonwealth Games

The Delhi University Stadium is a Rugby sevens stadium, situated within the North Campus of Delhi University. Spread over 10,000 square metres (110,000 sq ft), the stadium has a seating capacity of 2,500 permanent and 7,500 temporary seats. The construction work began in 2008 and it was inaugurated in July 2010, ahead of the 2010 Commonwealth Games, and also includes training area for Netball, Boxing, Women's Wrestling and Athletics. It hosts office of Delhi University Sports Council. It also houses other institutions of Delhi University like Cluster Innovation Centre, Delhi School of Journalism.

== History ==
After the games the stadium was handed over to the university by Commonwealth Games (CWG) Organising Committee, thereafter in 2011, the university initiated an extensive upgrade plan, to create a multi-purpose arena with both outdoor and indoor facilities, after its completion the university students could access its facilities in late 2011. The university made an extensive upgrade plan to create a multi-purpose arena with both outdoor and indoor facilities and has training area for netball, boxing, women's wrestling and athletics but in 2014, the university decided to offer infrastructural facilities for rent to generate resources because of high maintenance. In 2011, Cluster Innovation Centre was founded and hosted here. Since then, first, second and third floor of the building is taken up by Cluster Innovation Centre. In 2017, Delhi University started Delhi School of Journalism which takes up the ground floor and basement of the University Stadium Building.

== Overview ==
Features
Orientation – North South
Insulated roofing system
Rainwater harvesting
Sewerage treatment plant
Providing Variable refrigerant flow (VRF) system for grand stand building (HVAC system)
Use of ozone system (at main venue and Netball training venue's HVAC system) to have bacteria

and microbes free environment thus reducing the net tonnage of air conditioning required

Landscaping with plantation of trees having good dust, noise and gaseous pollutant absorbing quality
Use of silent type DG sets using low sulphur diesel oil
Use of dry type transformers
Use of structural glazing/glass for natural light
Hi-tech Irrigation system for field of play having facility of collecting the water

which passes through the root zone of the grass, for re-use after treatment

Use of recycled water for HVAC, horticulture and flushing
Glazing with double low E-glass

== 2010 Commonwealth Games ==
Wales vs South Africa Rugby Seevens at 2010 Commonwealth Games

Inaugurated on 15 July 2010, Delhi University Stadium hosted Rugby Sevens for the 2010 Commonwealth Games. The stadium, spread over an area of 10,000 metres, also served as the training venue for netball, boxing, women's wrestling and athletics during the Games.

Capacity	2,500 permanent seats 7,500 temporary
Competition Arena	Bermuda Princess 77 Grass – 120 m x 70 m

The stadium has features like auto-sprinkling technology, underground drainage system, ozone system for air-freshening, a low power consuming air-conditioning system and natural grass.

== Transport ==
The stadium is accessible via the Vishwavidyalaya metro station on the Delhi Metro's Yellow Line.
