= Jawaharlal Nehru Stadium, Delhi =

Multi-sports stadium in New Delhi, India

Coordinates: 28°34′58″N 77°14′04″E

Jawaharlal Nehru Stadium
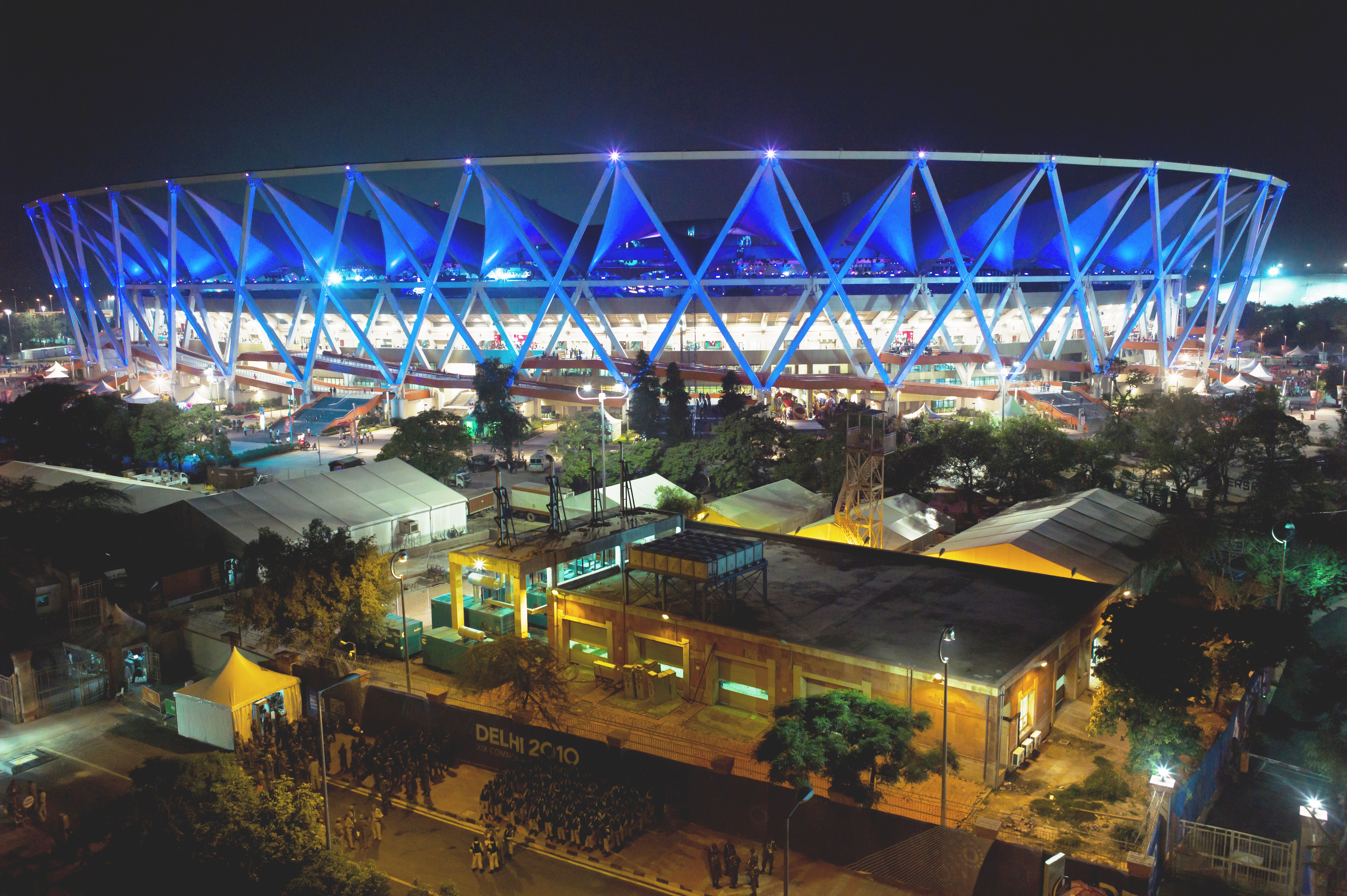
- The stadium during the opening ceremony of 2010 Commonwealth Games in October 2010
- Interactive map of Jawaharlal Nehru Stadium
- Location: New Delhi
- Owner: Sports Authority of India
- Capacity: 60,254
- Surface: Grass
- Scoreboard: Yes
- Field size: 106 m × 68 m (116 yd × 74 yd)
- Public transit: Jawaharlal Nehru Stadium

Construction
- Built: 1982
- Opened: 1983
- Renovated: 2010
- Cost: ₹961 crores
- Architects: Gerkan, Marg and Partners; Schlaich Bergermann Partner

Tenants
- India national football team (2011–present); Athletics Federation of India; Delhi football team; Delhi Football League; FD Women's League; SC Delhi (2025–present); Punjab FC (2013–present)

Jawaharlal Nehru Stadium is a multi-sports stadium located in New Delhi, India. It is named after the first Prime Minister of India. Primarily a venue for football and athletics, it is an all-seater 60,254-capacity stadium, designed and constructed to meet the international standards set by FIFA, the Asian Football Confederation (AFC), and World Athletics (WA). It is the fourth largest stadium in India, 27th largest stadium in Asia and the 103rd largest stadium in the world, in terms of seating capacity.

The Jawaharlal Nehru Stadium was originally constructed by the Government of India to host the athletic events and ceremonies of the 1982 Asian Games. It also hosted the 1989 Asian Championships in Athletics. The stadium was substantially renovated and modernised for the 2010 Commonwealth Games, hosting all the track and field events and opening and closing ceremonies. In 2010, the final cost of the renovation was announced, which was ₹961 crore (US$210.16 million), making it as the most expensive stadium ever built in India and South Asia. The stadium was redesigned by the German architectural companies Gerkan, Marg and Partners and Schlaich Bergermann Partner.

The stadium is a part of the Jawaharlal Nehru sports complex in central Delhi, which also houses the headquarters of the Sports Authority of India. The stadium is used by the India national football team for international competition and Indian Athletics. From 2014 to 2019, it was the home ground of the former Indian Super League football club Delhi Dynamos. The stadium can also hold music concerts with up to 100,000 spectators, and due to its oval shape, it is suitable to host other sporting events such as cricket. The stadium hosted some matches of the 2017 FIFA U-17 World Cup. It was scheduled to be used as one of the venues for the 2020 FIFA U-17 Women's World Cup.

== History ==
The Jawaharlal Nehru Stadium was constructed by the Government of India to host the 1982 Asian Games. A total of 3,411 athletes from 33 National Olympic Committees (NOCs) participated in these games, competing in 196 events in 21 sports and 23 disciplines. This was the first Asian Games to be held under the aegis of the Olympic Council of Asia. The stadium hosted the athletic events and opening and closing ceremonies. The capacity of the Jawaharlal Nehru Stadium was 78,000 during the games. The stadium also hosted the 1989 Asian Championships in Athletics.

=== Renovation ===
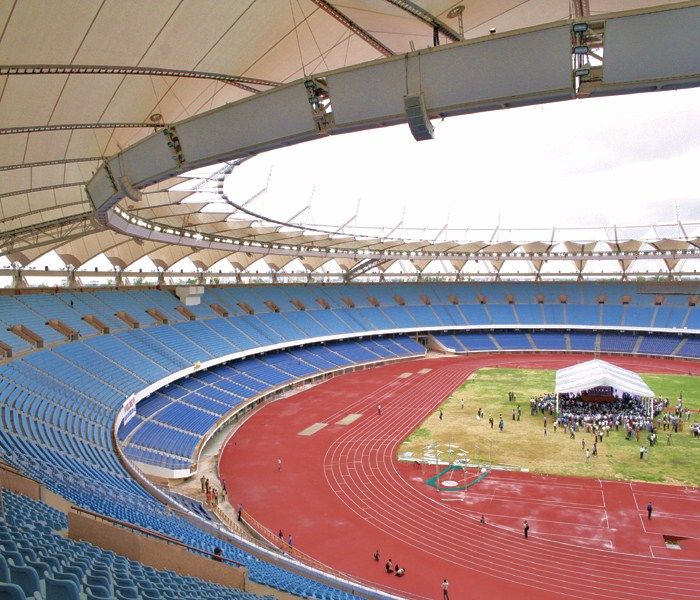
Interior of the Jawaharlal Nehru Stadium.

Delhi was selected as the host city of the 2010 Commonwealth Games on 14 November 2003 during the CGF General Assembly in Montego Bay, Jamaica, defeating the competing bid from Hamilton, Canada. In 2006, the Indian government decided to renovate the Jawaharlal Nehru Stadium for the Commonwealth Games.

The Indian government chose the design of the German architectural company Gerkan, Marg and Partners. Renovation of the stadium started in 2007. Nearly 4,000 construction workers worked on the stadium in double shifts. The substantially remodelled and modernised stadium was inaugurated on 27 July 2010. The stadium was given a new roof, improved seating, and other new facilities to meet international standards to allow it to host the athletic events and the opening and closing ceremonies of the 2010 Commonwealth Games. The capacity of the stadium was reduced from 78,000 to 60,254. The cost of the renovation was around ₹961 crore (US$210.16 million).

The 53,800 m^{2} (579,000 sq ft) Teflon-coated roof, designed by the German structural engineering and consulting firm Schlaich Bergermann Partner, was built at a cost of ₹308 crore (US$67.36 million). Taiyo Membrane Corporation supplied and installed the PTFE glass fibre fabric roof. It is one of the largest membrane roof system in the world. 8,500 tonnes of steel were used in the construction of the stadium's roof and its support structure. A new 10-lane synthetic Olympic standard running track and a synthetic grass field were added. A 400-metre warm-up track was also constructed. A 150 metre long tunnel below the ground of the stadium was constructed for the opening and closing ceremonies. In case of emergency, the construction of the stadium allows for all 60,000 spectators to be safely evacuated within 6 minutes. A new Electro-Voice professional audio system by Bosch Communications was set up in the stadium.

Two new venues were constructed next to the stadium for the Games: four synthetic greens for the lawn bowls event and a 2,172-seat gymnasium for the weightlifting event. The stadium is a part of the Jawaharlal Nehru sports complex which houses the headquarters of the Sports Authority of India. The design of the stadium is similar to Century Lotus Stadium in Foshan, China, designed by the same company.

== 2010 Commonwealth Games ==
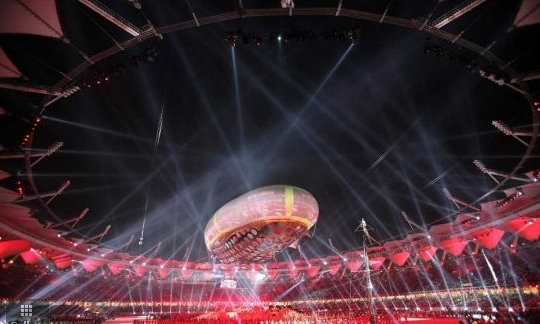
2010 Commonwealth Games opening ceremony at the Jawaharlal Nehru Stadium

Jawaharlal Nehru Stadium was the main venue for the 2010 Commonwealth Games. It hosted the opening and closing ceremonies as well as athletics events for the games. The stadium underwent massive redesign and reconstruction for the biggest multi-sport event hosted by India to that date. It was opened to the general public on 27 July 2010.

In July 2010, the first-ever Asian All Asian Athletics Championship was held. Over 1,500 students from schools came to see the event. The opening ceremony of the 2010 Commonwealth Games has been held. Security for the ceremony used NSG, CRPF and Delhi police personnel. Tickets were checked by electronic ticket checking machine similar to the ones used in the Delhi Metro. There are over 350 CCTV cameras in the venue. Delhi was closed, in the sense that all the malls, shops, offices, and call-centers in Delhi were closed before and during the ceremony.

== Football ==
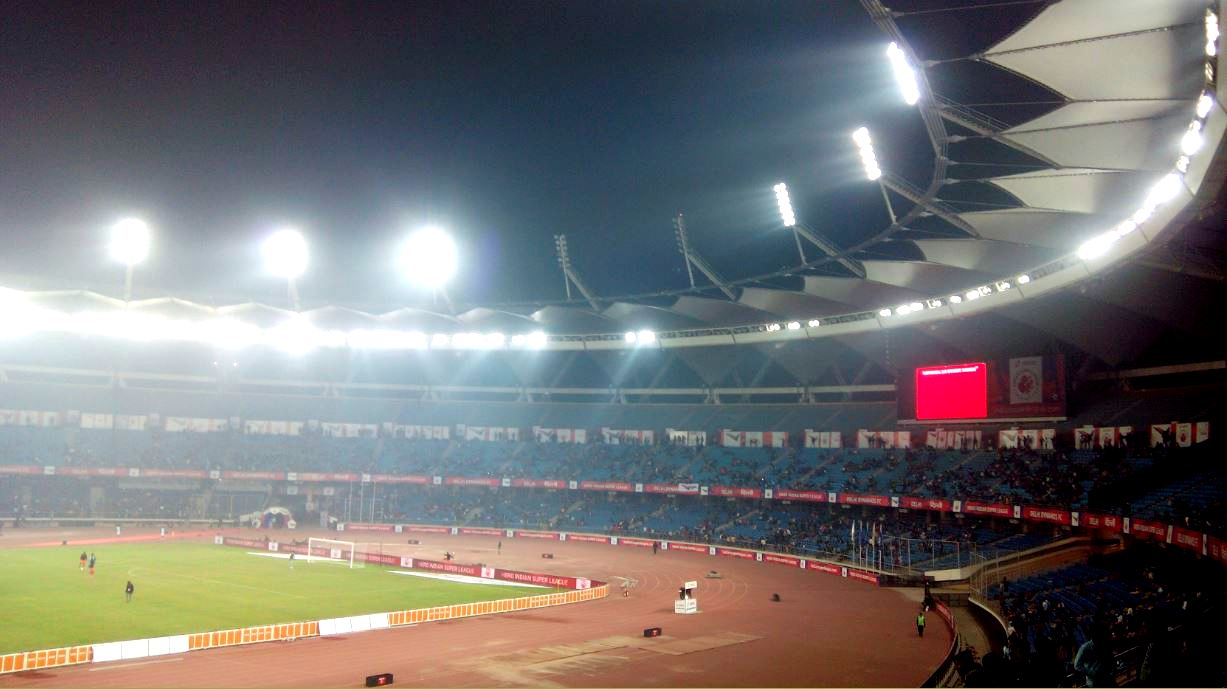
The stadium on a matchday of Indian Super League

I-League matches have also been played here. The stadium was the main venue for the 2011 SAFF Championship.

On 10 January 2012, the Government of India, and Audi, co-hosted a friendly football exhibition match between the India national football team and Bayern Munich at Jawaharlal Nehru stadium. In this one-sided affair, the German club has defeated Indian team by 4–0 in front of 30,000 spectators. This was the farewell match to Baichung Bhutia as India National Football Team captain.

From 2014 Indian Super League until 2019, it served as home ground for Delhi Dynamos FC. Before the 2019 season, the Dynamos moved to Bhubaneswar as Odisha FC.

The stadium hosted 8 matches (including 2 Round of 16 matches) of the 2017 FIFA U-17 World Cup. It will be used again for the 2020 FIFA U-17 Women's World Cup.

At the end of 2017–18 Indian Super League, the football pitch in the stadium was named as "Best Pitch" in the league by ISL itself. In 2023–24 Indian Super League season, the stadium has been used by league debutant Punjab as their home venue.

== Home of India national football team ==
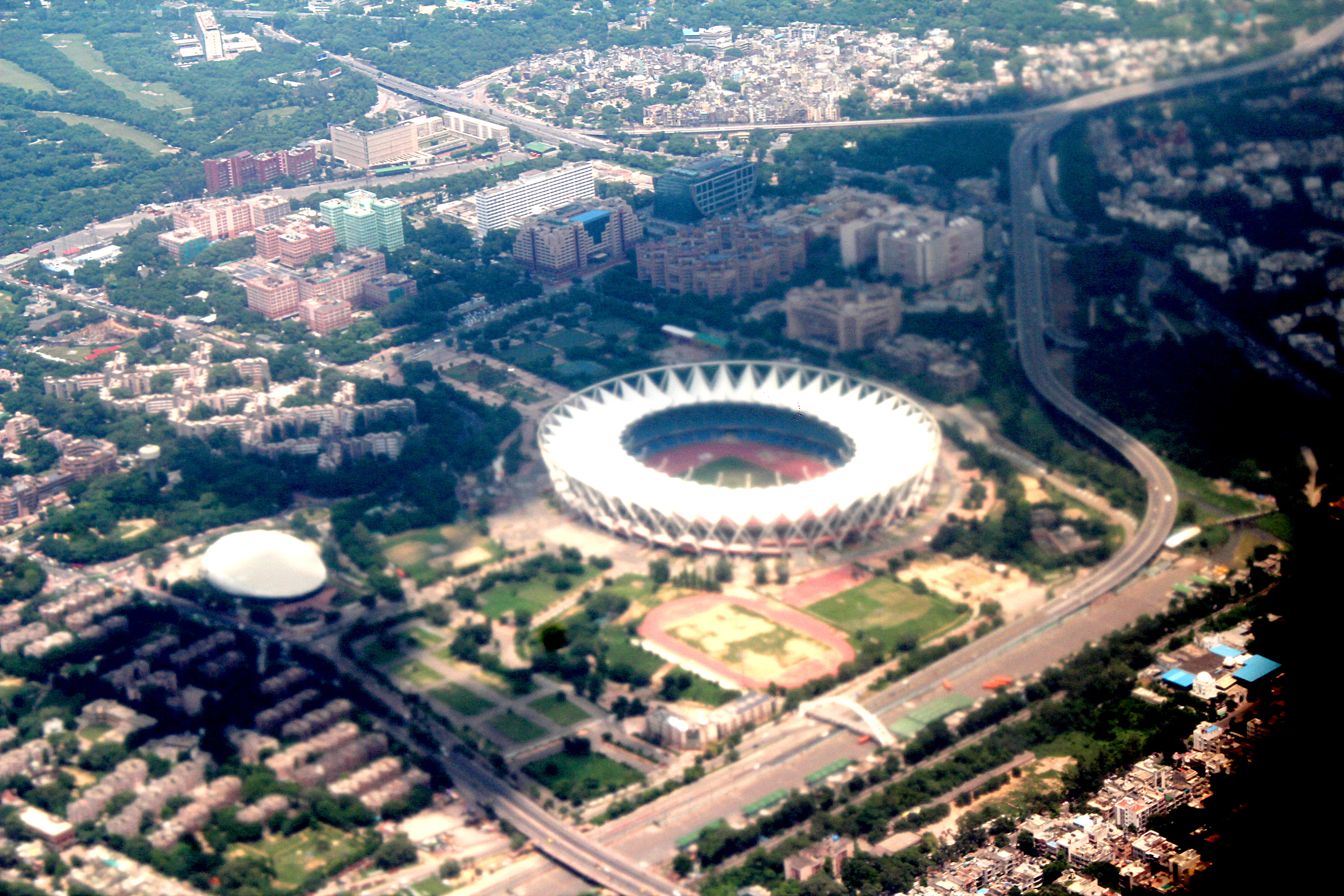
Aerial image of Jawaharlal Nehru Stadium

The India national football team will play its home matches in the Nehru Stadium after it was handed over by Sports Ministry to the AIFF. India's first match in the new stadium was to be played against UAE in 2014 FIFA World Cup qualification play-off in July 2011. However, this match was shifted to Ambedkar Stadium because of the unplayable conditions at the Nehru stadium. The 2011 SAFF Cup was held here from 2–11 December 2011, with the India national football team emerging victorious. The 2012 Nehru Cup was held from 23 August to 2 September at this venue.

== Concerts ==
The stadium played host to Amnesty International's Human Rights Now! Benefit Concert on 30 September 1988. The show was headlined by Bruce Springsteen and the E Street Band, and also featured Sting and Peter Gabriel, Tracy Chapman, Youssou N'Dour, and Ravi Shankar.

The project was led and managed by Mr. Ramji Lal from CPWD.

Michael Jackson was scheduled to perform 2 concerts at the stadium in December 1993 as a part of his Dangerous World Tour. Some tickets were also sold. This would have been the first time Jackson would have performed in India. MTV India and other TV channels played Jackson's music videos months before the concert which created mass hysteria and anticipation in the public for the concerts and Jackson's visit to India. Both the concerts were expected to be sold out. These two concerts were scheduled to be the last performances of the tour. Unfortunately the concerts in Delhi along with the dates for Indonesia and Australia were cancelled due to Jackson's health problems.

On 18 and 19 October 2025, Houston-born rapper Travis Scott performed there as part of the Asian leg of his Circus Maximus Tour. Both shows sold out in a matter of minutes. Selling over 200,000 tickets, Travis holds the record for the most tickets sold for a rap concert in India's history.

Shakira will perform on April 15, 2026, as part of her Las Mujeres Ya No Lloran World Tour, becoming the first ever international female artist to perform in the stadium.

== 2025 World Para Athletics championships ==
The Jawaharlal Nehru stadium was the main venue for the 2025 World Para Athletics Championships (also known as IndianOil New Delhi 2025 World Para Athletics Championships for sponsorship reasons) was a para-athletics meet organised by the World Para Athletics, the respective sport branch of the International Paralympic Committee. This was the 12th edition of the event and were held at Jawaharlal Nehru Stadium, New Delhi, from 27 September to 5 October 2025. This was the first time the event has been hosted in India as well as in South Asia.

== Cricket ==
The Stadium has hosted two One Day International matches featuring India against Australia in 1984 which incidentally, was the first day-night one day international match under floodlights to be held in India. and South Africa in 1991, again the fixture being a day night one (also being the second ever day-night cricket match in India) . Batsman Kepler Wessels played in both the matches but for different countries and scored 107 for Australia and 90 for South Africa.

A highly unusual feature of the ground was the inclusion of the running track as part of the cricket playing outfield area. The ICC's playing regulations eventually discontinued permission for the running track to be used in this way and thus the stadium was felt to be no longer suitable for cricket.

=== ODI matches hosted ===
Team (A)	Team (B)	Winner	Margin	Year
India	Australia	Australia	By 48 runs	1984
India	South Africa	South Africa	By 8 wickets	1991

== List of centuries ==
=== Key ===
- * denotes that the batsman was not out.
- Inns. denotes the number of the innings in the match.
- Balls denotes the number of balls faced in an innings.
- NR denotes that the number of balls was not recorded.
- Parentheses next to the player's score denotes his century number at Edgbaston.
- The column title Date refers to the date the match started.
- The column title Result refers to the player's team result

=== One Day Internationals ===
No.	Score	Player	Team	Balls	Inns.	Opposing team	Date	Result
1	107	Kepler Wessels	Australia	133	1	India	28 September 1984	Won
2	109	Ravi Shastri	India	149	1	South Africa	14 November 1991	Lost
3	105	Sanjay Manjrekar	India	82	1	South Africa	14 November 1991	Lost

== See also ==
- List of football stadiums in India
- List of Asian stadiums by capacity
- List of association football stadiums by capacity
- Lists of stadiums

Preceded by National Stadium (Thailand); Bangkok	Asian Games; Main Venue; 1982	Succeeded by (South Korea) Seoul Olympic Stadium; Seoul
Preceded by National Stadium (Singapore); Singapore	Asian Athletics Championships; Main Venue; 1989	Succeeded by (Malaysia) Stadium Merdeka; Kuala Lumpur
Preceded by (Australia) Melbourne Cricket Ground; Melbourne	Commonwealth Games; Opening ceremonies Main Venue; 2010	Succeeded by (Scotland) Celtic Park; Glasgow
Preceded by (Australia) Melbourne Cricket Ground; Melbourne	Commonwealth Games Athletics competitions Main venue 2010	Succeeded by (Scotland) Hampden Park; Glasgow
