= 2011 World Amateur Boxing Championships – Lightweight =

Boxing competitions

The Lightweight competition was the fourth lightest class featured at the 2011 World Amateur Boxing Championships, held at the Heydar Aliyev Sports and Exhibition Complex. Boxers were limited to a maximum of 60 kilograms (130 lb) in body mass.

== Medalists ==
Gold	Vasyl Lomachenko (UKR)
Silver	Yasniel Toledo (CUB)
Bronze	Domenico Valentino (ITA)
Bronze	Gani Zhailauov (KAZ)

== Seeds ==
1. (Italy) Domenico Valentino (semifinals)
2. (Russia) Albert Selimov (first round)
3. (Cuba) Yasniel Toledo (Second Place)
4. (Ukraine) Vasyl Lomachenko (champion)
5. (Germany) Eugen Burhard (third round)
6. (Turkey) Fatih Keleş (first round)
7. (Republic of Ireland) David Joyce (third round)
8. (Azerbaijan) Elvin Isayev (second round)
9. (Algeria) Abdelkader Chadi (second round)

== Draw ==
=== Finals ===
Semifinals
1	Domenico Valentino (ITA)	11
4	Vasyl Lomachenko (UKR)	17
3	Yasniel Toledo (CUB)	21
2	Gani Zhailauov (KAZ)	9

Final
Vasyl Lomachenko (UKR)	17
Yasniel Toledo (CUB)	12

=== Round of 128 ===
Round of 128
	Score	
Ayrin Ismetov (BUL)	13–6	Matius Mandiangan (INA)
Tomasz Vano (SVK)	11–15	Héctor Manzanilla (VEN)

=== Top half ===
==== Section 1 ====
First Round
Domenico Valentino (ITA)	15
Ayrin Ismetov (BUL)	10
Kendall Ebanks (CAY)	5
Mahdi Ouatine (MAR)	21
Branimir Stanković (SRB)	19
Dmitri Galagoț (MDA)	10
Alejandro Rynn (CAN)	19
Ahmed Mejri (TUN)	13
Abdelkader Chadi (ALG)	23
Jean Colin (MRI)	9
Miklós Varga (HUN)	16
Nikoloz Izoria (GEO)	11
Cobia Breedy (BAR)	9
Madadi Nagzibekov (TJK)	29
Redouane Kaya (SWE)	8
Elvin Isayev (AZE)	15

Second Round
Domenico Valentino (ITA)	+15
Mahdi Ouatine (MAR)	15
Branimir Stanković (SRB)	18
Alejandro Rynn (CAN)	11
Abdelkader Chadi (ALG)	18
Miklós Varga (HUN)	19
Madadi Nagzibekov (TJK)	23
Elvin Isayev (AZE)	15

Third Round
Domenico Valentino (ITA)	26
Branimir Stanković (SRB)	23
Miklós Varga (HUN)	28
Madadi Nagzibekov (TJK)	20

Quarterfinals
Domenico Valentino (ITA)	27
Miklós Varga (HUN)	13

==== Section 2 ====
First Round
Eugen Burhard (GER)	13
Joseph Cordina (WAL)	7
Murad Pazzyyev (TKM)	19
Ratha Svay (CAM)	9
Fazliddin Gaibnazarov (UZB)	RSC
Kao Chih-yuan (TPE)
Ensa Jammeh (GAM)	2
Wellington Arias (DOM)	20
Martin Ward (ENG)	15
Dragos Marin (ROU)	7
Robson Conceição (BRA)	16
Michał Chudecki (POL)	7
Vladimir Sarukhanyan (ARM)	12
José Ramírez (USA)	22
Lomalito Moala (TON)
Vasyl Lomachenko (UKR)	RSC

Second Round
Eugen Burhard (GER)	14
Murad Pazzyyev (TKM)	6
Fazliddin Gaibnazarov (UZB)	15
Wellington Arias (DOM)	8
Martin Ward (ENG)	20
Robson Conceição (BRA)	21
José Ramírez (USA)	9
Vasyl Lomachenko (UKR)	16

Third Round
Eugen Burhard (GER)	7
Fazliddin Gaibnazarov (UZB)	8
Robson Conceição (BRA)	18
Vasyl Lomachenko (UKR)	19

Quarterfinals
Fazliddin Gaibnazarov (UZB)	10
Vasyl Lomachenko (UKR)	18

=== Bottom half ===
==== Section 3 ====
First Round
Yasniel Toledo (CUB)	13
Angel Gutiérrez (MEX)	8
Luke Jackson (AUS)	19
Mmoloki Nogeng (BOT)	8
Charly Suárez (PHI)	11
Luiz Porozo (ECU)	13
Sailom Adi (THA)	18
Andrique Alissop (SEY)	7
Ivan Barankchyk (BLR)	12
Han Soon-Chul (KOR)	19
Syimyk Abdyldabek (KGZ)	+21
Rashid Kassem (DEN)	21
Duljano Westhiner (NED)	8
Mohamed Eliwa (EGY)	18
Liu Qiang (CHN)	16
Fatih Keleş (TUR)	10

Second Round
Yasniel Toledo (CUB)	11
Luke Jackson (AUS)	10
Luiz Porozo (ECU)	6
Sailom Adi (THA)	17
Han Soon-Chul (KOR)	24
Syimyk Abdyldabek (KGZ)	11
Mohamed Eliwa (EGY)	6
Liu Qiang (CHN)	14

Third Round
Yasniel Toledo (CUB)	20
Sailom Adi (THA)	9
Han Soon-Chul (KOR)	16
Liu Qiang (CHN)	9

Quarterfinals
Yasniel Toledo (CUB)	15
Han Soon-Chul (KOR)	10

==== Section 4 ====
First Round
David Joyce (IRL)	23
Mohammad Moumivand (IRI)	11
Abdullatef Sadiq (QAT)	5
Mohammad Khaiber (AFG)	20
Miroslav Serban (CZE)	16
Nuwan Thennakkon (SRI)	10
Evaldas Petrauskas (LTU)	8
Jai Bhagwan (IND)	15
Gani Zhailauov (KAZ)	18
Shota Nakayama (JPN)	12
José Roca (BOL)	DSQ
Artjoms Ramlavs (LAT)
César Villarraga (COL)	11
Javkhlan Bariadi (MGL)	15
Héctor Manzanilla (VEN)
Albert Selimov (RUS)	DSQ

Second Round
David Joyce (IRL)	26
Mohammad Khaiber (AFG)	13
Miroslav Serban (CZE)	6
Jai Bhagwan (IND)	14
Gani Zhailauov (KAZ)	19
Artjoms Ramlavs (LAT)	5
Javkhlan Bariadi (MGL)	18
Héctor Manzanilla (VEN)	16

Third Round
David Joyce (IRL)	30
Jai Bhagwan (IND)	32
Gani Zhailauov (KAZ)	19
Javkhlan Bariadi (MGL)	15

Quarterfinals
Jai Bhagwan (IND)	10
Gani Zhailauov (KAZ)	11
