= Tonga at the 2022 Commonwealth Games =

- Flag of Tonga
- CG code: TGA
- CGA: Tonga Sports Association and National Olympic Committee
- Website: facebook.com/TASANOC (Facebook)

in Birmingham, England 28 July 2022 – 8 August 2022
- Competitors: 26 (20 men and 6 women) in 6 sports
- Flag bearers (opening): Sione Tupou; Kuinini Manumua
- Flag bearer (closing): TBD
- Medals: Gold 0 Silver 0 Bronze 0 Total 0

Commonwealth Games appearances (overview)
- 1974; 1978; 1982; 1986; 1990; 1994; 1998; 2002; 2006; 2010; 2014; 2018; 2022; 2026; 2030

Tonga competed at the 2022 Commonwealth Games at Birmingham, England from 28 July to 8 August 2022. Tonga made its eleventh attendance at the Games.

Sione Tupou and Kuinini Manumua were the country's flagbearers during the opening ceremony.

== Competitors ==
The following is the list of number of competitors participating at the Games per sport/discipline.

Sport	Men	Women	Total
Athletics	1	1	2
Boxing	0	1	1
Rugby sevens	13	0	13
Swimming	2	2	4
Weightlifting	1	1	2
Wrestling	3	1	4
Total	20	6	26

== Athletics ==
Men
Track and road events

Athlete	Event	Heat		Semifinal		Final	
Athlete	Event	Result	Rank	Result	Rank	Result	Rank
Ronald Fotofili	100 m	10.80	6	Did not advance			

Women
Field events

Athlete	Event	Qualification		Final	
Athlete	Event	Distance	Rank	Distance	Rank
Ata Maama Tuutafaiva	Shot put	15.37	12 q	16.30	10

== Boxing ==
Athlete	Event	Round of 16	Quarterfinals	Semifinals	Final	
Athlete	Event	Opposition Result	Opposition Result	Opposition Result	Opposition Result	Rank
Mele Ula	Women's Middleweight	Bye	Umunnakwe (NGR); L DSQ	Did not advance		

== Rugby sevens ==
As of 9 March 2022, Tonga qualified for the men's tournament. The intended Oceania qualifier (scheduled for April 2022) was cancelled, so the quota allocation was determined by Tonga's performance in the 2019 Oceania Sevens Championship.

Summary

team	Event	Preliminary round				Quarterfinal / CQ	Semifinal / CS	Final / BM / PF	
team	Event	Opposition Result	Opposition Result	Opposition Result	Rank	Opposition Result	Opposition Result	Opposition Result	Rank
Tonga men	Men's tournament	Scotland; L 0 - 41	South Africa; L 5 - 36	Malaysia; W 31 - 7	3	Zambia; W 19 - 7	Uganda; L 7 - 27	—N/a	=11

=== Men's tournament ===
Roster

- Walter Fifita
- Sione Tupou
- Samson Fualalo
- Samisoni Asi
- Rodney Tongotea
- Niukula Osika
- John Tapueluelu
- John Ika
- Edward Sunia
- Atieli Pakalani
- Amanaki Veamatahau
- Latuselu Vailea
- Tevita Halafihi

Pool B

Pos	Team	Pld	W	D	L	PF	PA	PD	Pts	Qualification
1	South Africa	3	3	0	0	116	5	+111	9	Advance to Quarter-finals
2	Scotland	3	2	0	1	91	46	+45	7	Advance to Quarter-finals
3	Tonga	3	1	0	2	36	84	−48	5	Advance to classification Quarter-finals
4	Malaysia	3	0	0	3	19	127	−108	3	Advance to classification Quarter-finals

Source: Birmingham2022
Rules for classification: 1) Points; 2) Head-to-head result; 3) Point difference; 4) Points scored.

29 July 2022
12:18

Scotland	41–0	Tonga
Try: Sofolarin (3) 1' c, 4' m, 7' m Henry 8' c Edmunds 9' m Farndale 12' m Coombes 14' c Con: Barreto (2/4) 1', 9'; Elms (0/2); Barreto (1/1) 14'; Cards: Elms (yellow card) 13'	Report

Coventry Stadium, Coventry
Referee: Adam Leal (England)

29 July 2022
20:48

South Africa	36–5	Tonga
Try: Soyizwapi 1' m Grobbelaar (2) 3' c, 5' m Pretorius 8' m Makata 9' c Human 14' c Con: Brown (2/5) 4', 9'; Human (1/1) 14'	Report	Try: Asi 7' m Con: Asi (0/1); Cards: Ika (red card) 13'

Coventry Stadium, Coventry
Referee: Jordan Way (Australia)

30 July 2022
11:56

Tonga	31–7	Malaysia
Try: Asi 1' c Pakalani (2) 3' c, 4 m Vailea 9' c Halafihi 14' m Con: Pakalani (2/3) 1', 3'; Asi (1/2) 10'	Report	Try: Nasarrudin 13' c Con: Said (1/1) 13'

Coventry Stadium, Coventry
Referee: Ben Breakspear (Wales)

Classification Quarterfinals

30 July 2022
19:20

Tonga	19–7	Zambia
Try: Tongotea 6' c Fualalo 8' m Sunia 8' c Con: Pakalani (2/3) 7', 9'	Report	Try: Mukosa 11' c Con: Mbalwe (1/1) 12'; Cards: Bwalya (yellow card) 6'; Nkoma (yellow card) 14'

Coventry Stadium, Coventry
Referee: Adam Leal (England)

Classification Semifinals

31 July 2022
11:36

Uganda	27–7	Tonga
Try: Okorach 1' m Kasito 7' m Wokorach (2) 8' m, 11' m Ofoyrwoth 14' c Con: Wokorach (0/4); Kisiga (1/1) 14'	Report	Try: Osika 4' c Con: Pakalani (1/1) 4'; Cards: Halafihi (yellow card) 10'

Coventry Stadium, Coventry
Referee: Tevita Rokovereni (Fiji)

== Swimming ==
Men

Athlete	Event	Heat		Semifinal		Final	
Athlete	Event	Time	Rank	Time	Rank	Time	Rank
Finau Ohuafi	50 m freestyle	24.92	=49	Did not advance			
Finau Ohuafi	100 m freestyle	54.51	51	Did not advance			
Finau Ohuafi	100 m butterfly	59.45	42	Did not advance			
Alan Uhi	50 m freestyle	24.92	=49	Did not advance			
Alan Uhi	50 m backstroke	27.79	30	Did not advance			
Alan Uhi	100 m backstroke	1:01.94	30	Did not advance			
Alan Uhi	50 m butterfly	26.83	45	Did not advance			

Women

Athlete	Event	Heat		Semifinal		Final	
Athlete	Event	Time	Rank	Time	Rank	Time	Rank
Charissa Panuve	50 m freestyle	30.35	62	Did not advance			
Charissa Panuve	100 m freestyle	1:05.87	54	Did not advance			
Charissa Panuve	200 m freestyle	2:26.19	29	—N/a		Did not advance	
Charissa Panuve	400 m freestyle	5:13.63	23	—N/a		Did not advance	
Charissa Panuve	50 m butterfly	32.56	48	Did not advance			
Charissa Panuve	100 m butterfly	1:17.96	37	Did not advance			
Vaoahi Afu	50 m breaststroke	40.65	32	Did not advance			
Vaoahi Afu	100 m breaststroke	1:29.31	28	Did not advance			

== Weightlifting ==
Two weightlifters (one man, one woman) were selected on 15 April 2022.

Athlete	Event	Weight lifted		Total	Rank
Athlete	Event	Snatch	Clean & jerk	Total	Rank
Sio Pomelile	Men's 109 kg	140	180	320	8
Kuinini Manumua	Women's +87 kg	107	128	235	5

== Wrestling ==
Key:

- VT - Victory by Fall.
- PP - Decision by Points - the loser with technical points.
- PO - Decision by Points - the loser without technical points.

Athlete	Event	Round of 16	Quarterfinal	Semifinal	Repechage	Final / BM	
Athlete	Event	Opposition Result	Opposition Result	Opposition Result	Opposition Result	Opposition Result	Rank
John Vake	Men's -74 kg	Tahir (PAK); L 0 - 11	Did not advance		Phulka (CAN); L 0 - 11	Did not advance	15
Sione Sika	Men's -97 kg	Bye	Alofipo (SAM); L 0 - 11	Did not advance			9
Aaron Lehauli	Men's -125 kg	Kooner (ENG); L 3 - 13	Did not advance				7
Tiger Lily Cocker Lemalie	Women's -68 kg	Bye	Roy (BAN); W 10 - 0	Oborududu (NGR); L 0 - 10	—N/a	Kakran (IND); L 0 - 2	5
