= 2012 Oceania Boxing Olympic Qualification Tournament =

Boxing competitions

The 2012 Oceania Boxing Olympic Qualification Tournament was held in Canberra, Australia from 21 to 25 March.

== Qualified athletes ==
| Weight | 1st |
|---|---|
| Light flyweight (49 kg) | Billy Ward (AUS) |
| Flyweight (52 kg) | Jackson Woods (AUS) |
| Bantamweight (56 kg) | Ibrahim Balla (AUS) |
| Lightweight (60 kg) | Luke Jackson (AUS) |
| Light welterweight (64 kg) | Jeff Horn (AUS) |
| Welterweight (69 kg) | Cameron Hammond (AUS) |
| Middleweight (75 kg) | Jesse Ross (AUS) |
| Light heavyweight (81 kg) | |
| Heavyweight (91 kg) | Jai Opetaia (AUS) |
| Super heavyweight (+91 kg) | Johan Linde (AUS) |

== Qualification summary ==
| NOC | 49 | 52 | 56 | 60 | 64 | 69 | 75 | 81 | 91 | +91 | Total |
|---|---|---|---|---|---|---|---|---|---|---|---|
| Australia | X | X | X | X | X | X | X | | X | X | 9 |
| Total: 1 NOC | 1 | 1 | 1 | 1 | 1 | 1 | 1 | 0 | 1 | 1 | 9 |

== Results ==
=== Light flyweight ===
| Final; 25 March |
| Billy Ward (AUS) | 21 |
| Charlie Keama (PNG) | 19 |

=== Flyweight ===
| Final; 25 March |
| Jackson Woods (AUS) | RSC |
| Kauko Raka (PNG) |

=== Bantamweight ===
Quarterfinals; 21 March
Henry Umings (PNG) | 15
Kaisa Ioane (SAM) | 20

Semifinals; 23 March
Mateaki Taumalolo (TGA) | 10
Gage Brown (NZL) | 28
Ibrahim Balla (AUS) | 21
Kaisa Ioane (SAM) | 9

Final; 25 March
Gage Brown (NZL) | 8
Ibrahim Balla (AUS) | 19

=== Lightweight ===
Quarterfinals; 21 March
Luke Jackson (AUS) | RSC
Tom Boga (PNG)
Mosese Uaita (SAM) | 12
Colan Caleb (NRU) | 23

Semifinals; 23 March
Lomalito Moala (TGA) | 13
Chad Milnes (NZL) | 14
Luke Jackson (AUS) | 15
Colan Caleb (NRU) | 6

Final; 25 March
Chad Milnes (NZL) | 5
Luke Jackson (AUS) | 18

=== Light welterweight ===
| Semifinals; 23 March | | Final; 25 March |
| | | Hinoma Livai (SAM) |
| Harrison Scaife (NZL) | | Jeff Horn (AUS) | RSC |
| Jeff Horn (AUS) | RSC |

=== Welterweight ===
Quarterfinals; 21 March
Sosefo Falekaono (TGA) | 4
Cameron Hammond (AUS) | 13

Semifinals; 23 March
Joseph Deireragea (NRU) | 8
Bowyn Morgan (NZL) | 15
Henry Tyrell (SAM) | 2
Cameron Hammond (AUS) | 16

Final; 25 March
Bowyn Morgan (NZL) | 8
Cameron Hammond (AUS) | 19

=== Middleweight ===
Quarterfinals; 21 March
Joe Blackbourn (NZL) | 9
Jesse Ross (AUS) | 17
Petelo Matagi (SAM) | RSC
Etu Iorangi (COK)

Semifinals; 23 March
Tevita Pomale (TGA) | 8
Andrew Kometa (KIR) | 17
Jesse Ross (AUS) | 14
Petelo Matagi (SAM) | 6

Final; 25 March
Andrew Kometa (KIR) | 7
Jesse Ross (AUS) | 17

=== Heavyweight ===
Quarterfinals; 21 March
Tarieta Ruata (KIR) | 12
Posala Pelo (SAM) | 10
Filipe Kava (TGA) | DSQ
David Light (NZL)

Semifinals; 23 March
Jai Opetaia (AUS) | RSC
Mokopuna Nooroa (COK)
Tarieta Ruata (KIR)
David Light (NZL) | RSC

Final; 25 March
Jai Opetaia (AUS) | 15
David Light (NZL) | 10

=== Super heavyweight ===
Quarterfinals; 21 March
Uaine Fa Jr (TGA) | 11
Joseph Parker (NZL) | 8

Semifinals; 23 March
Johan Linde (AUS) | RSC
Harold Netzler (SAM)
Jubilee Arama (COK)
Uaine Fa Jr (TGA) | RSC

Final; 25 March
Johan Linde (AUS) | RSCH
Uaine Fa Jr (TGA)

== See also ==
- Boxing at the 2012 Summer Olympics – Qualification
