= Wrestling at the 2022 Commonwealth Games =

Wrestling Event

- Venue: Coventry Arena
- Location: Coventry, England
- Dates: 5 to 6 August 2022
- Competitors: 119 from 26 nations

Wrestling at the 2022 Commonwealth Games was the 19th appearance of Wrestling at the Commonwealth Games. The wrestling competitions at the 2022 Commonwealth Games was held in Coventry, England, on 5 and 6 August 2022. The sport was one of six original sports at the Games and featured in all editions except 1990, 1998, 2006 and 2026. It was held for the third time within England specifically and was spread across twelve weight categories in the freestyle discipline.

== Schedule ==
The competition schedule was as follows:

Preliminaries, quarter-finals, semi-finals & repechages	Medal matches

Men
Date Event	Fri 5		Sat 6	
Session →	M	E	M	E
57 kg				
65 kg				
74 kg				
86 kg				
97 kg				
125 kg				

Women
Date Event	Fri 5		Sat 6	
Session →	M	E	M	E
50 kg				
53 kg				
57 kg				
62 kg				
68 kg				
76 kg				

== Venue ==
The wrestling competitions were held at the Coventry Arena in Coventry. The judo competitions also took place there, whilst the adjacent Coventry Stadium was host to rugby sevens.

== Medal summary ==
* Host nation (England)

Rank	CGA	Gold	Silver	Bronze	Total
1	India	6	1	5	12
2	Canada	3	5	4	12
3	Nigeria	3	2	2	7
4	Pakistan	0	3	1	4
5	South Africa	0	1	0	1
6	England*	0	0	3	3
7	Australia	0	0	2	2
7	New Zealand	0	0	2	2
9	Cameroon	0	0	1	1
9	Sri Lanka	0	0	1	1
Totals (10 entries)		12	12	21	45

=== Medalists ===
==== Men's freestyle ====
Event	Gold	Silver	Bronze
57 kg	Ravi Kumar Dahiya; India	Ebikewenimo Welson; Nigeria	Darthe Capellan; Canada
57 kg	Ravi Kumar Dahiya; India	Ebikewenimo Welson; Nigeria	Suraj Singh; New Zealand
65 kg	Bajrang Punia; India	Lachlan McNeil; Canada	Inayat Ullah; Pakistan
65 kg	Bajrang Punia; India	Lachlan McNeil; Canada	George Ramm; England
74 kg	Naveen Malik; India	Muhammad Sharif Tahir; Pakistan	Ogbonna John; Nigeria
74 kg	Naveen Malik; India	Muhammad Sharif Tahir; Pakistan	Jasmit Phulka; Canada
86 kg	Deepak Punia; India	Muhammad Inam; Pakistan	Alex Moore; Canada
86 kg	Deepak Punia; India	Muhammad Inam; Pakistan	Jayden Lawrence; Australia
97 kg	Nishan Randhawa; Canada	Nicolaas de Lange; South Africa	Deepak Nehra; India
97 kg	Nishan Randhawa; Canada	Nicolaas de Lange; South Africa	Thomas Barns; Australia
125 kg	Amar Dhesi; Canada	Zaman Anwar; Pakistan	Mandhir Kooner; England
125 kg	Amar Dhesi; Canada	Zaman Anwar; Pakistan	Mohit Grewal; India

==== Women's freestyle ====
Event	Gold	Silver	Bronze
50 kg	Mercy Genesis; Nigeria	Madison Parks; Canada	Pooja Gehlot; India
50 kg	Mercy Genesis; Nigeria	Madison Parks; Canada	Not awarded (only six entries)
53 kg	Vinesh Phogat; India	Samantha Stewart; Canada	Not awarded (only four entries)
53 kg	Vinesh Phogat; India	Samantha Stewart; Canada	Not awarded (only four entries)
57 kg	Odunayo Adekuoroye; Nigeria	Anshu Malik; India	Hannah Taylor; Canada
57 kg	Odunayo Adekuoroye; Nigeria	Anshu Malik; India	Nethmi Poruthotage; Sri Lanka
62 kg	Sakshi Malik; India	Ana Godinez; Canada	Esther Kolawole; Nigeria
62 kg	Sakshi Malik; India	Ana Godinez; Canada	Berthe Etane Ngolle; Cameroon
68 kg	Blessing Oborududu; Nigeria	Linda Morais; Canada	Divya Kakran; India
68 kg	Blessing Oborududu; Nigeria	Linda Morais; Canada	Tayla Ford; New Zealand
76 kg	Justina Di Stasio; Canada	Hannah Rueben; Nigeria	Georgina Nelthorpe; England
76 kg	Justina Di Stasio; Canada	Hannah Rueben; Nigeria	Pooja Sihag; India

== Participating nations ==
There were 26 participating Commonwealth Games Associations (CGA's) in wrestling with a total of 119 (73 men and 46 women) athletes. The number of athletes a nation entered is in parentheses beside the name of the country.

- Australia (6)
- Bahamas (2)
- Bangladesh (4)
- Cameroon (4)
- Canada (12)
- Cyprus (2)
- England (8)
- India (12)
- Jamaica (1)
- Kenya (2)
- Malta (2)
- Mauritius (5)
- Namibia (2)
- Nauru (1)
- New Zealand (6)
- Nigeria (10)
- Pakistan (6)
- Samoa (2)
- Scotland (6)
- Singapore (3)
- Sierra Leone (5)
- South Africa (4)
- Sri Lanka (6)
- Tonga (4)
- Uganda (2)
- Wales (2)
