= Boxing at the 2012 Summer Olympics – Men's lightweight =

Boxing competitions

Men's lightweight boxing at the Games of the XXX Olympiad
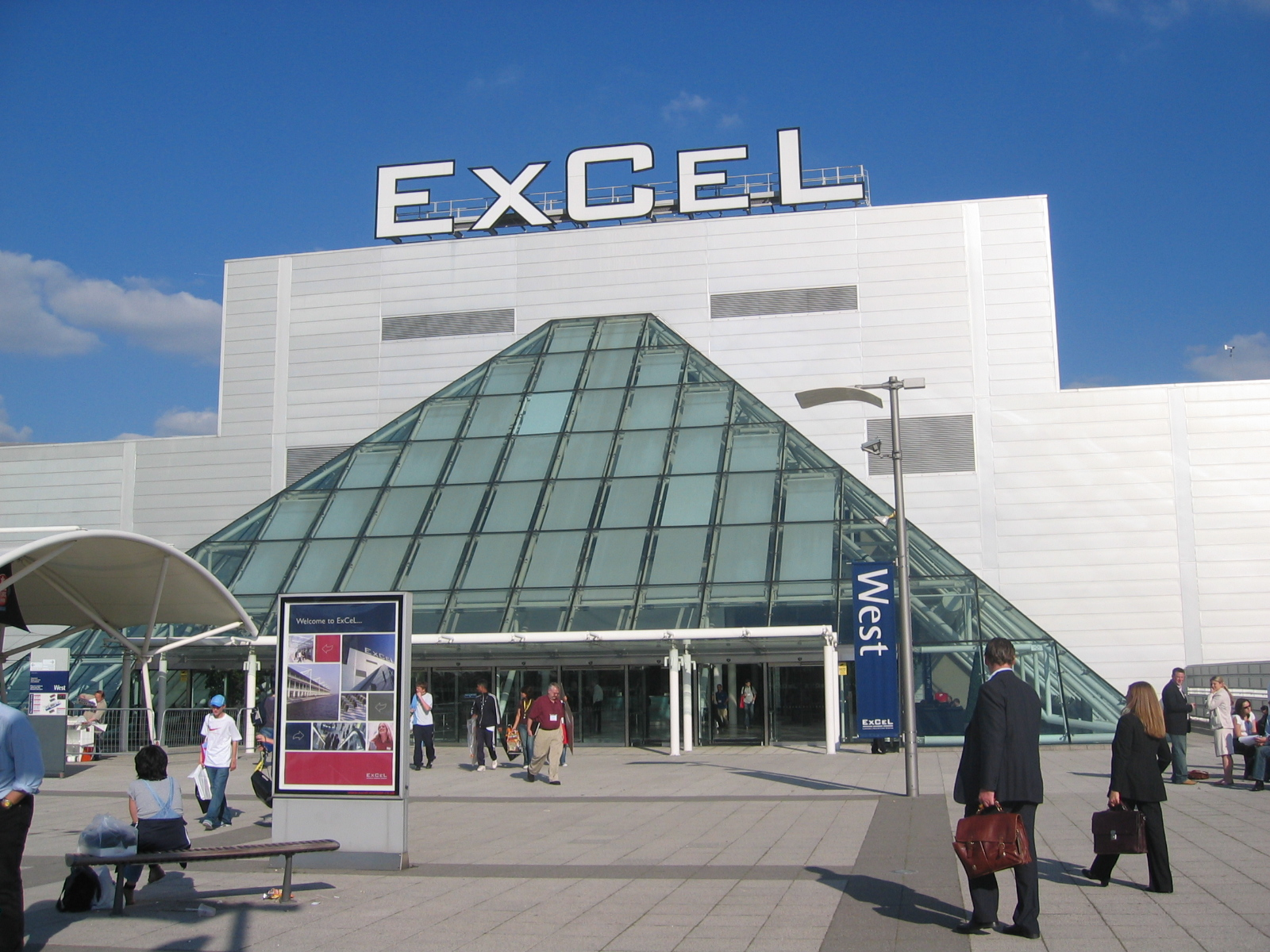
- ExCel Exhibition Centre
- Venue: ExCeL Exhibition Centre
- Date: 29 July to 12 August 2012
- Competitors: 28 from 28 nations

Medalists
1st place, gold medalist(s)		Vasyl Lomachenko	Ukraine
2nd place, silver medalist(s)		Han Soon-chul	South Korea
3rd place, bronze medalist(s)		Yasniel Toledo	Cuba
3rd place, bronze medalist(s)		Evaldas Petrauskas	Lithuania

The men's lightweight boxing competition at the 2012 Olympic Games in London was held from 30 July to 12 August at the ExCeL Exhibition Centre.

This competition consisted of 28 boxers from 28 nations competed.

== Competition format ==
Like all Olympic boxing events, the competition was a straight single-elimination tournament. This competition consisted of 28 boxers who had qualified for the competition through various qualifying tournaments held in 2011 and 2012. The competition began with a preliminary round on 29 July, where the number of competitors was reduced to 16, and concluded with a final on 12 August. As there were less than 32 boxers in the competition a number of boxers received a bye for the preliminary round. Both semi-final losers were awarded bronze medals, so no boxers competed again after their first loss.

All bouts consist of three three-minute periods where the boxers receive points for every successful punch they land on their opponent's head or upper body. The boxer with the most points at the end of the bouts wins. If a boxer is knocked to the ground and cannot get up before the referee counts to 10 then the bout is over and the opponent wins.

== Schedule ==
All times are British Summer Time (UTC+1)

Date	Time	Round
Sunday 29 July 2012	13:30 & 20:30	Round of 32
Thursday 2 August 2012	13:30 & 20:30	Round of 16
Monday 6 August 2012	20:30	Quarter-finals
Friday 10 August 2012	21:00	Semi-finals
Sunday 12 August 2012	13:45	Final

== Results ==
=== Finals ===
Semi-finals
Vasyl Lomachenko (UKR)	14
Yasniel Toledo (CUB)	11
Evaldas Petrauskas (LTU)	13
Han Soon-chul (KOR)	18

Final
Vasyl Lomachenko (UKR)	19
Han Soon-chul (KOR)	9

=== Top half ===
Round of 32
Wellington Arias (DOM)	17
Eduar Marriaga (COL)	8
Ahmed Mejri (TUN)	16
Shafiq Chitou (BEN)	9
Félix Verdejo (PUR)	11
Juan Huertas (PAN)	5
Gani Zhailauov (KAZ)	12+
Sailom Adi (THA)	12
Andrique Allisop (SEY)	8
Jai Bhagwan (IND)	18
Luke Jackson (AUS)	7
Liu Qiang (CHN)	20

Round of 16
Vasyl Lomachenko (UKR)	15
Wellington Arias (DOM)	3
Ahmed Mejri (TUN)	7
Félix Verdejo (PUR)	16
Gani Zhailauov (KAZ)	16
Jai Bhagwan (IND)	8
Liu Qiang (CHN)	10
Yasniel Toledo (CUB)	14

Quarter-finals
Vasyl Lomachenko (UKR)	14
Félix Verdejo (PUR)	9
Gani Zhailauov (KAZ)	11
Yasniel Toledo (CUB)	19

Semi-finals
Vasyl Lomachenko (UKR)	14
Yasniel Toledo (CUB)	11

=== Bottom half ===
Round of 32
Robson Conceição (BRA)	9
Josh Taylor (GBR)	13
Evaldas Petrauskas (LTU)	20
Miklos Varga (HUN)	12
Abdelkader Chadi (ALG)	8
Fatih Keleş (TUR)	15
Fazliddin Gaibnazarov (UZB)	11
Yhyacinthe Mewoli Abdon (CMR)	6
Rachid Azzedine (FRA)	20
Jose Ramírez (USA)	21
Mohamed Ramadan (EGY)	6
Han Soon-chul (KOR)	11

Round of 16
Domenico Valentino (ITA)	15
Josh Taylor (GBR)	10
Evaldas Petrauskas (LTU)	16
Fatih Keleş (TUR)	12
Fazliddin Gaibnazarov (UZB)	15
Jose Ramírez (USA)	11
Han Soon-chul (KOR)	13+
Vazgen Safaryants (BLR)	13

Quarter-finals
Domenico Valentino (ITA)	14
Evaldas Petrauskas (LTU)	16
Fazliddin Gaibnazarov (UZB)	13
Han Soon-chul (KOR)	16

Semi-finals
Evaldas Petrauskas (LTU)	13
Han Soon-chul (KOR)	18
