= Tonga at the 2014 Commonwealth Games =

- CGF code: TGA
- CGA: Tonga Sports Association and National Olympic Committee
- Website: oceaniasport.com/tonga

in Glasgow, Scotland
- Competitors: 16 in 4 sports
- Flag bearer: Uaine Fa Jr
- Medals: Gold 0 Silver 0 Bronze 0 Total 0

Commonwealth Games appearances (overview)
- 1974; 1978; 1982; 1986; 1990; 1994; 1998; 2002; 2006; 2010; 2014; 2018; 2022; 2026; 2030

Tonga competed in the 2014 Commonwealth Games in Glasgow, Scotland from 23 July – 3 August 2014. The country was represented by sixteen athletes in five sports. Participating in their ninth Commonwealth Games, Tonga won a total of three bronze medals during previous editions. Boxers Uaine Fa and Lomalito Moala, bronze medallists in 2010, competed in Glasgow.

== Athletics ==
Men
Track & road events

Athlete	Event	Heat		Semifinal		Final	
Athlete	Event	Result	Rank	Result	Rank	Result	Rank
Siueni Filimone	100 m	10.72 PB	38	did not advance			
Heamatangi Tuivai	400 m	49.54	40	did not advance			
Tongia Vakaafi	Marathon	—				24	2:58:57

Key

- Note–Ranks given for track events are within the athlete's heat only
- Q = Qualified for the next round
- q = Qualified for the next round as a fastest loser or, in field events, by position without achieving the qualifying target
- NR = National record
- N/A = Round not applicable for the event

== Boxing ==
Men

Athlete	Event	Round of 32	Round of 16	Quarterfinals	Semifinals	Final	
Athlete	Event	Opposition Result	Opposition Result	Opposition Result	Opposition Result	Opposition Result	Rank
Ikani Falekaono	Light welterweight	Maxwell (ENG); L KO2	did not advance				
Oscar Finau	Welterweight	Davidson (ANT); W 3 - 0	Donnelly (NIR); L 0 - 3	did not advance			
Sosefo Falekaono	Middleweight	Finau (NZL); L 0 - 3	did not advance				
Benjamin Taualii	Light heavyweight	Bye	Thorley (WAL); L KO1	did not advance			
Uaine Fa	Super heavyweight	—	Ajagba (NGR); L 0 - 3	did not advance			

== Diving ==
Women

Athlete	Event	Preliminaries		Final	
Athlete	Event	Points	Rank	Points	Rank
Maria Zarka	1 m springboard	172.45	13	did not advance	
Maria Zarka	3 m springboard	184.40	13	did not advance	

== Swimming ==
Men

Athlete	Event	Heat		Semifinal		Final	
Athlete	Event	Time	Rank	Time	Rank	Time	Rank
Tong Li Panuve	50 m freestyle	27.51	65	did not advance			
Ifalemi Sau-Paea	50 m freestyle	24.34	=31	did not advance			
Tong Li Panuve	100 m freestyle	1:00.34	58	did not advance			
Ifalemi Sau-Paea	100 m freestyle	52.76	26	did not advance			
Tong Li Panuve	200 m freestyle	2:12.70	36	—		did not advance	
Tong Li Panuve	400 m freestyle	4:49.35	28	—		did not advance	
Ifalemi Sau-Paea	50 m butterfly	25.40	19	did not advance			
Ifalemi Sau-Paea	100 m butterfly	55.62	18	did not advance			

Women

Athlete	Event	Heat		Semifinal		Final	
Athlete	Event	Time	Rank	Time	Rank	Time	Rank
Irene Prescott	50 m freestyle	28.77	41	did not advance			
Irene Prescott	100 m freestyle	1:05.51	40	did not advance			
Irene Prescott	50 m backstroke	34.66	35	did not advance			
Irene Prescott	50 m butterfly	31.98	44	did not advance			

== Weightlifting ==
Men

Athlete	Event	Snatch		Clean & Jerk		Total	Rank
Athlete	Event	Result	Rank	Result	Rank	Total	Rank
Penisimani Siolaa	−69 kg	90	16	120	15	210	15
Wilford Vea	−105 kg	130	9	150	9	280	9

Women

Athlete	Event	Snatch		Clean & Jerk		Total	Rank
Athlete	Event	Result	Rank	Result	Rank	Total	Rank
Suliana Fate	+75 kg	74	12	92	13	166	13
