= Tonga at the 2010 Commonwealth Games =

- CGF code: TON
- CGA: Tonga Sports Association and National Olympic Committee
- Website: oceaniasport.com/tonga

in Delhi, India
- Flag bearers: Opening: Closing:
- Medals Ranked 31st: Gold 0 Silver 0 Bronze 2 Total 2

Commonwealth Games appearances (overview)
- 1974; 1978; 1982; 1986; 1990; 1994; 1998; 2002; 2006; 2010; 2014; 2018; 2022; 2026; 2030

Tonga competed at the 2010 Commonwealth Games in Delhi, India, from 3 October – 14 October 2010. Tonga's team is expected to comprise about 20 athletes, and as many officials. Tongan athletes competed in archery, swimming, weightlifting, Rugby 7s, boxing, athletics and shooting.

The Queen's Baton arrived in Tonga in May 2010.

Tonga's first Commonwealth swimmer, Amini Fonua, reached the final of the men's 50m breaststroke, after having made the semifinal of the 100m breaststroke.

== Medalist ==
Medal	Name	Sport	Event
Bronze	Lomalito Moala	Boxing	Lightweight
Bronze	Junior Fa	Boxing	Super heavyweight

== See also ==
- Nations at the 2010 Commonwealth Games
