= Tonga at the Commonwealth Games =

- CGF code: TGA (TON used at these Games)
- CGA: Tonga Sports Association and National Olympic Committee
- Website: oceaniasport.com/tonga
- Medals Ranked 57th: Gold 0 Silver 0 Bronze 3 Total 3

Commonwealth Games appearances (overview)
- 1974; 1978; 1982; 1986; 1990; 1994; 1998; 2002; 2006; 2010; 2014; 2018; 2022; 2026; 2030

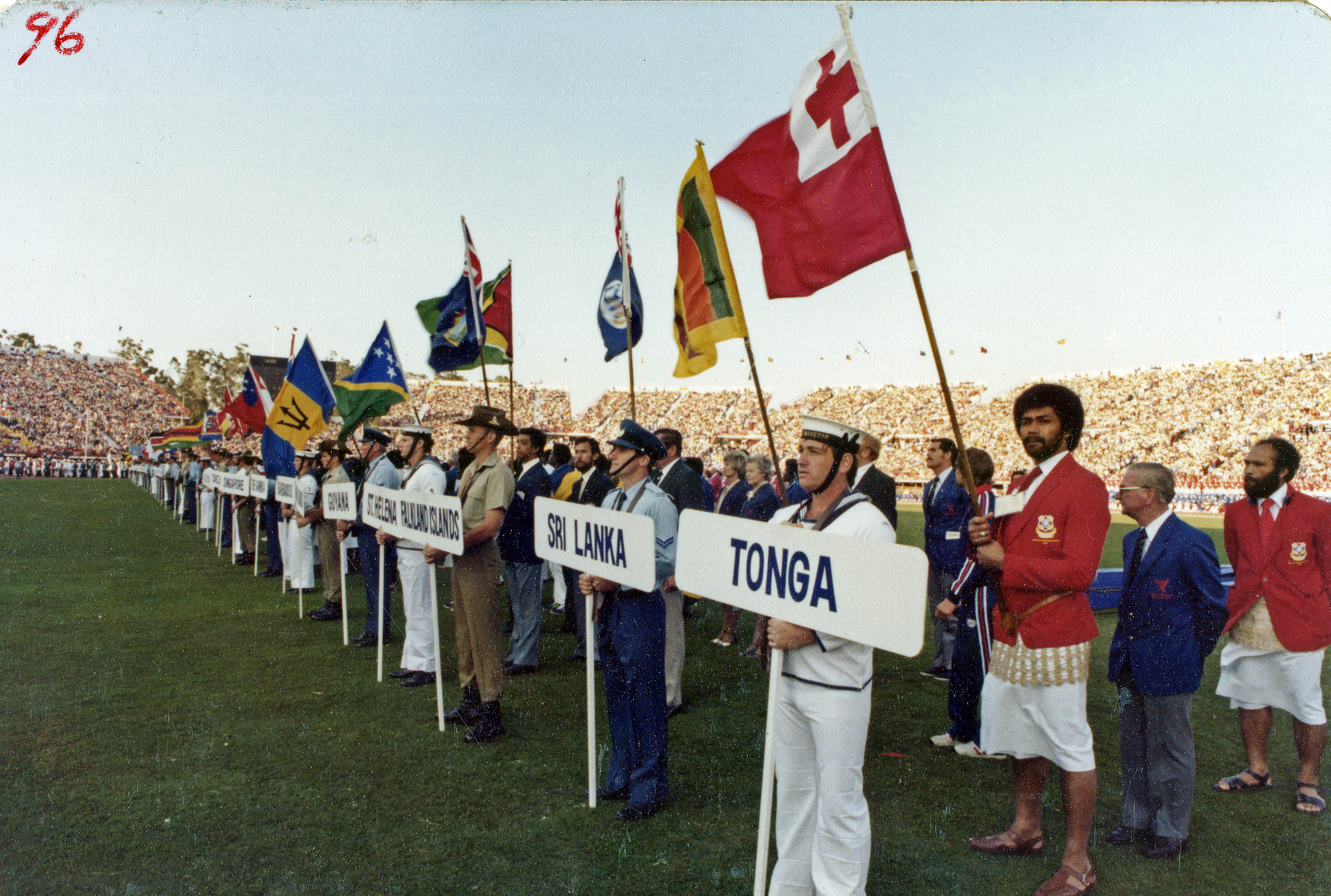
The opening ceremony in Brisbane, 1982

The Kingdom of Tonga has been a member of the Commonwealth of Nations since 1970. It has taken part in ten editions of the Commonwealth Games to date, beginning in 1974. Tonga's participation is under the responsibility of the Tonga Sports Association and National Olympic Committee (TASANOC).

== Medal tally ==
Games	Gold	Silver	Bronze	Total
1974 Christchurch	0	0	0	0
1982 Brisbane	0	0	0	0
1990 Auckland	0	0	0	0
1994 Victoria	0	0	1	1
1998 Kuala Lumpur	0	0	0	0
2002 Manchester	0	0	0	0
2006 Melbourne	0	0	0	0
2010 Delhi	0	0	2	2
2014 Glasgow	0	0	0	0
2018 Gold Coast	0	0	0	0
2022 Birmingham	0	0	0	0
Totals (11 entries)	0	0	3	3

Prior to the 2010 Commonwealth Games in Delhi, Tonga ranked joint fifty-fourth on the all-time medal tally of the Commonwealth Games having won a single medal when Paea Wolfgram took bronze in the Men's Super Heavyweight in boxing at the 1994 Games.

During the Delhi Games that tally has increased to three medals after Lomalito Moala and Junior Fa each secured a bronze medal in the Men's Lightweight and Men's Super Heavyweight boxing events respectively.

== See also ==
- All-time medal tally of Commonwealth Games
