= Tonga at the 2018 Commonwealth Games =

- Flag of Tonga
- CG code: TGA
- CGA: Tonga Sports Association and National Olympic Committee
- Website: oceaniasport.com/tonga

in Gold Coast, Australia 4 April 2018 – 15 April 2018
- Competitors: 13 in 6 sports
- Flag bearer: Magan Maka
- Medals Ranked 0th: Gold 0 Silver 0 Bronze 0 Total 0

Commonwealth Games appearances (overview)
- 1974; 1978; 1982; 1986; 1990; 1994; 1998; 2002; 2006; 2010; 2014; 2018; 2022; 2026; 2030

Tonga competed at the 2018 Commonwealth Games in the Gold Coast, Australia from 4 to 15 April 2018.

The Tongan team consisted of 13 athletes (seven men and six women) that competed in six sports. Boxer Magan Maka was the country's flag bearer during the opening ceremony.

== Competitors ==
The following is the list of number of competitors participating at the Games per sport/discipline.

Sport	Men	Women	Total
Athletics (track and field)	1	1	2
Boxing	3	2	5
Lawn bowls	0	2	2
Shooting	1	0	1
Swimming	1	1	2
Weightlifting	1	0	1
Total	7	6	13

== Athletics (track and field) ==
Tonga participated with a team of 2 athletes (1 man and 1 woman).

Track & road events

Athlete	Event	Heat		Final	
Athlete	Event	Result	Rank	Result	Rank
Talatala Po'oi	Men's 110 m hurdles	15.02	8	did not advance	

Field events

Athlete	Event	Qualification		Final	
Athlete	Event	Distance	Position	Distance	Position
ʻAta Maama Tuutafaiva	Women's Shot put	14.79	11 q	15.36	10

== Boxing ==
Tonga participated with a team of 5 athletes (3 men and 2 women).

Athlete	Event	Round of 32	Round of 16	Quarterfinals	Semifinals	Final	Rank
Athlete	Event	Opposition Result	Opposition Result	Opposition Result	Opposition Result	Opposition Result	Rank
Tuihalangingie Vea	Men's −60 kg	BYE	Jean Colin (MRI); L 0-4	did not advance			
John Moleni	Men's −69 kg	Stephen Newns (SCO); L 1-4	did not advance				
Samiuela Kei	Men's +91 kg	—N/a	Arsène Fokou Fosso (CMR); L 0-5	did not advance			
Magan Maka	Women's −69 kg	—N/a	Bye	Rosie Eccles (WAL); L 0 - 5	did not advance		
Salote Huni	Women's −75 kg	—N/a	Millicent Agboegbulem (NGR); L 0-5	did not advance			

== Lawn bowls ==
Tonga will compete in Lawn bowls.

Athlete	Event	Group Stage					Quarterfinal	Semifinal	Final / BM	
Athlete	Event	Opposition Score	Opposition Score	Opposition Score	Opposition Score	Rank	Opposition Score	Opposition Score	Opposition Score	Rank
Malia Kioa	Women's Singles	Murphy (AUS); L 4 - 21	Siame (ZAM); W 21 - 10	Piketh (RSA); L 4 - 21	Beattie (NIR); L 13 - 21	4	did not advance			
Caroline Dubois; Malia Kioa	Women's Pairs	Norfolk Island; L 10 - 21	Fiji; L 11 - 21	New Zealand; L 6 - 29	Canada; L 12 - 20	5	did not advance			

== Shooting ==
Tonga participated with one male athlete.

Athlete	Event	Qualification		Final	
Athlete	Event	Points	Rank	Points	Rank
Henry Liutai	Men's Trap	63	39	did not advance	

== Swimming ==
Tonga participated with a team of 2 swimmers (1 man and 1 woman).

Athlete	Event	Heat		Semifinal		Final	
Athlete	Event	Time	Rank	Time	Rank	Time	Rank
Finau Ohuafi	Men's 50 m freestyle	26.07	54	did not advance			
Finau Ohuafi	Men's 50 m backstroke	29.97	17	did not advance			
Finau Ohuafi	Men's 50 m butterfly	28.00	50	did not advance			
Charissa Panuve	Women's 50 m freestyle	30.34	36	did not advance			
Charissa Panuve	Women's 50 m backstroke	36.37	29	did not advance			
Charissa Panuve	Women's 50 m butterfly	33.09	29	did not advance			

== Weightlifting ==
Tonga participated with 1 athlete (1 man).

Athlete	Event	Snatch		Clean & Jerk		Total	Rank
Athlete	Event	Result	Rank	Result	Rank	Total	Rank
Sateki Langi	Men's −105 kg	115	13	141	11	256	10

== See also ==
- Tonga at the 2018 Summer Youth Olympics
- Tonga at the 2018 Winter Olympics
