= Boxing at the 2010 Commonwealth Games – Lightweight =

Boxing competitions

The Lightweight class is an event on the boxing at the 2010 Commonwealth Games competition. Lightweights were limited to those boxers weighing less than 60 kilograms (132.28 lbs).

34 boxers competed, this is the largest amount of entries in any weight class.

Like all Olympic boxing events, the competition was a straight single-elimination tournament. Both semifinal losers were awarded bronze medals, so no boxers compete again after their first loss. Bouts consisted of three rounds of three minutes each, with one-minute breaks between rounds. Punches scored only if the front of the glove made full contact with the front of the head or torso of the opponent. Five judges scored each bout; three of the judges had to signal a scoring punch within one second for the punch to score. The winner of the bout was the boxer who scored the most valid punches by the end of the bout.

== Medalists ==
Gold	Tom Stalker; England
Silver	Josh Taylor; Scotland
Bronze	Jai Bhagwan; India
Bronze	Lomalito Moala; Tonga

== Tournament ==
=== Finals ===
Semifinals
1	Jai Bhagwan (IND)	5
4	Tom Stalker (ENG)	10
3	Josh Taylor (SCO)	5
2	Lomalito Moala (TON)	0

Final
Tom Stalker (ENG)	11
Josh Taylor (SCO)	3

=== Top half ===
Round of 64

Round of 32
Joseph Ndungu (KEN)	12
Cobia Breedy (BAR)	1
Nawaz Khan (PAK)	1
Waheed Sogambu (NGR)	11
Colan Caleb (NRU)	1
Jai Bhagwan (IND)	11
Naseer Mafuru (TAN)	6
Andrew Opugu (PNG)	1
Clevon Rock (GUY)	1
Tom Stalker (ENG)	8
Jewel Jony (BAN)	2
Kamal Sameera (SRI)	6
Sahid Lansana (SLE)	1
Mmoloki Nogeng (BOT)	12
Tsepo Lepoqo (LES)	1
Luke Jackson (AUS)	6

Round of 16
Joseph Ndungu (KEN)	3
Waheed Sogambu (NGR)	4
Jai Bhagwan (IND)	11
Naseer Mafuru (TAN)	2
Tom Stalker (ENG)	4
Kamal Sameera (SRI)	0
Mmoloki Nogeng (BOT)	1
Luke Jackson (AUS)	+1

Quarterfinals
Waheed Sogambu (NGR)	1
Jai Bhagwan (IND)	10
Tom Stalker (ENG)	7
Luke Jackson (AUS)	2

Semifinals
Jai Bhagwan (IND)	5
Tom Stalker (ENG)	10

=== Bottom half ===
Round of 64
Mikka Shonena (NAM)	3
Mark O'Hara (NIR)	6
Angus Donaldson (NZL)	7
Ensa Jammeh (GAM)	1

Round of 32
Kautoa Roddy (KIR)	11
Daly Darroux (DMA)	0
Jewel Lewis (GRN)	1
Dalton George (LCA)	RSCH R3 28
Kaisa Ioane (SAM)	17
Benjamin Lamptey (GHA)	6
Darren Edwards (WAL)	1
Josh Taylor (SCO)	5
Muhammad Hafiz (MAS)	2
Lomalito Moala (TON)	RSCH R3 53
Martin Chibela (ZAM)	4
Felix Mwamaso (MAW)	3
Jean Colin (MRI)	0
Alex Rynn (CAN)	7
Mark O'Hara (NIR)	6
Angus Donaldson (NZL)	0

Round of 16
Kautoa Roddy (KIR)
Dalton George (LCA)	DSQ
Kaisa Ioane (SAM)	1
Josh Taylor (SCO)	4
Lomalito Moala (TON)	6
Martin Chibela (ZAM)	4
Alex Rynn (CAN)	9
Mark O'Hara (NIR)	5

Quarterfinals
Kautoa Roddy (KIR)	0
Josh Taylor (SCO)	10
Lomalito Moala (TON)	4
Alex Rynn (CAN)	2

Semifinals
Josh Taylor (SCO)	5
Lomalito Moala (TON)	0
