= Zhailauov =

Zhailauov is a surname. Notable people with the surname include:

- Gani Zhailauov (born 1985), Kazakhstani boxer
- Talgat Zhailauov (born 1985), Kazakhstani ice hockey player
