= Tonga at the 1994 Commonwealth Games =

- CG code: TON
- CGA: Tonga Sports Association and National Olympic Committee
- Website: oceaniasport.com/tonga

in Victoria, British Columbia, Canada
- Flag bearers: Opening: Closing:
- Medals: Gold 0 Silver 0 Bronze 1 Total 1

Commonwealth Games appearances (overview)
- 1974; 1978; 1982; 1986; 1990; 1994; 1998; 2002; 2006; 2010; 2014; 2018; 2022; 2026; 2030

Tonga at the 1994 Commonwealth Games was abbreviated TGA.

== Medals ==
	Gold	Silver	Bronze	Total
Tonga	0	0	1	1

== Medalists ==
=== Gold ===
- none

=== Silver ===
- none

=== Bronze ===
- Paea Wolfgramm — Boxing, Men's Super Heavyweight
