= Liu Qiang (boxer) =

Chinese boxer

Liu Qiang 刘强
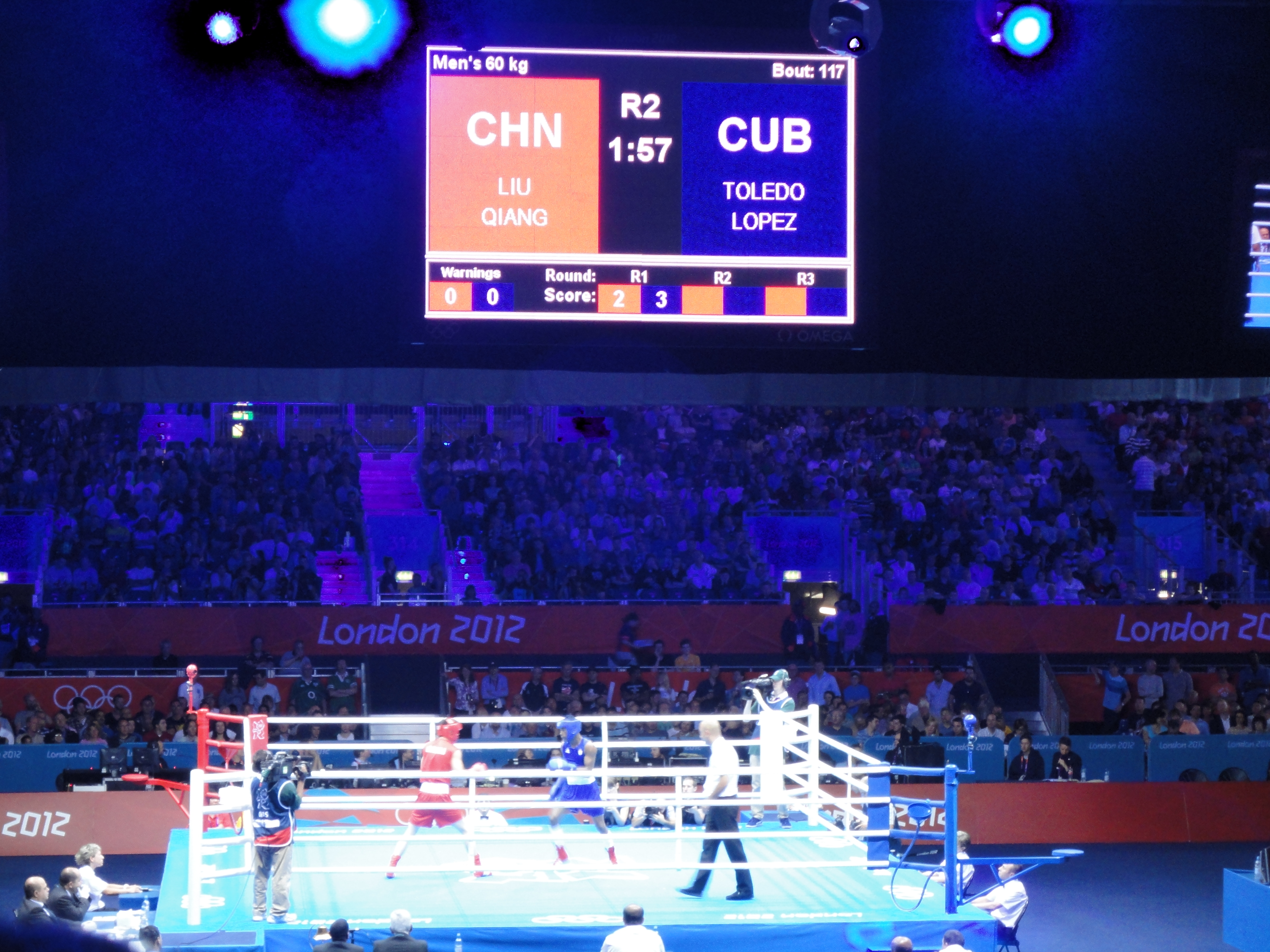
- Round of 16 bout against Yasniel Toledo (blue) at the 2012 Summer Olympics

Personal information
- Full name: Liú Qiáng
- Nationality: China
- Born: December 14, 1982 (age 43) Shenyang, Liaoning, China
- Weight: 60 kg (130 lb)

Sport
- Sport: Boxing
- Weight class: Lightweight

Liu Qiang (born December 14, 1982, in Shenyang, Liaoning) is a Chinese amateur lightweight boxer who competed at the 2012 Olympics.

At his first major international tournament, the 2011 World Amateur Boxing Championships, he won two bouts before losing to South Korea's Han Soon-Chul.

He qualified for the 2012 Olympics by winning the 2012 Asian Boxing Olympic Qualification Tournament. At the Olympic tournament (results) he defeated Australian Luke Jackson but lost 10:14 to Cuban Yasniel Toledo.
