= 2021 U23 World Wrestling Championships – Men's freestyle 125 kg =

Wrestling Championship

The men's freestyle 125 kilograms is a competition featured at the 2021 U23 World Wrestling Championships, and was held in Belgrade, Serbia on 6 and 7 November.

== Medalists ==
Gold	Tony Cassioppi; United States
Silver	Azamat Khosonov; Greece
Bronze	Saipudin Magomedov; Russia
Bronze	Mehdi Hashemi; Iran

== Results ==
Legend

- F — Won by fall

=== Final ===
Final
Tony Cassioppi (USA)	13^{F}
Azamat Khosonov (GRE)	0

=== Top half ===
Round of 32

Round of 16
Paris Karepi (ALB)	5
Aaron Johnson (JAM)	0
Tony Cassioppi (USA)	13^{F}
Martin Simonyan (ARM)	8
Namoz Abdurashidov (UZB)	0
Saipudin Magomedov (RUS)	3
Georgi Ivanov (BUL)	12
Uvejs Fejzullahu (MKD)	2

Quarterfinals
Paris Karepi (ALB)	0
Tony Cassioppi (USA)	7
Saipudin Magomedov (RUS)	8
Georgi Ivanov (BUL)	3

Semifinals
Tony Cassioppi (USA)	5
Saipudin Magomedov (RUS)	0

=== Bottom half ===
Round of 32
Anıl Kılıçsallayan (TUR)	3
Aly Barghout (CAN)	2
Mehdi Hashemi (IRI)	2
Şamhan Jabrailov (MDA)	0^{R}
Yaraslau Slavikouski (BLR)	11
Lior Altshuler (ISR)	0
Yurii Idzinskyi (UKR)	1
Solomon Manashvili (GEO)	12

Round of 16
Mohit Grewal (IND)	11
Blas Ortiz (PUR)	0
Bakdaulet Osserbay (KAZ)	0
Azamat Khosonov (GRE)	7^{F}
Anıl Kılıçsallayan (TUR)	0
Mehdi Hashemi (IRI)	11
Yaraslau Slavikouski (BLR)	8
Solomon Manashvili (GEO)	1

Quarterfinals
Mohit Grewal (IND)	2
Azamat Khosonov (GRE)	4
Mehdi Hashemi (IRI)	5
Yaraslau Slavikouski (BLR)	3

Semifinals
Azamat Khosonov (GRE)	4^{F}
Mehdi Hashemi (IRI)	0

=== Repechage ===
Repechage round 1
Martin Simonyan (ARM)	5
Paris Karepi (ALB)	2
Bakdaulet Osserbay (KAZ)	0
Mohit Grewal (IND)	10

Bronze medals
Martin Simonyan (ARM)	0
Saipudin Magomedov (RUS)	10
Mohit Grewal (IND)	3
Mehdi Hashemi (IRI)	6
