= Evaldas Petrauskas =

Lithuanian boxer (born 1992)

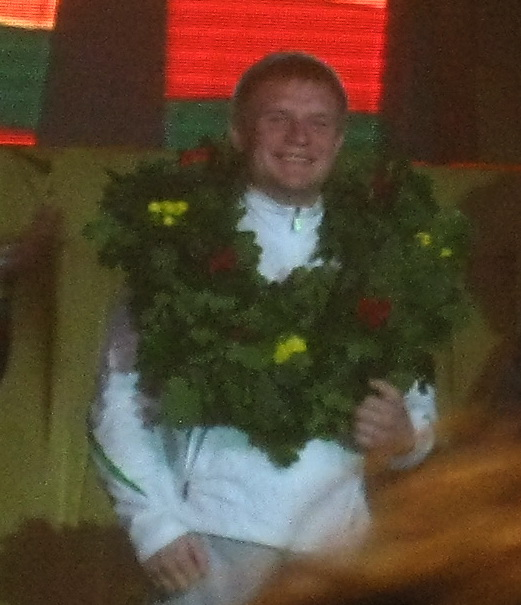
- Petrauskas in Vilnius, 2012

Personal information
- Nationality: Lithuanian
- Born: 19 March 1992 (age 34) Šilutė, Lithuania
- Height: 1.64 m (5 ft 5 in)
- Weight: 60 kg (132 lb)

Boxing career
- Weight class: Lightweight, Light welterweight

Boxing record
- Total fights: 2
- Wins: 2
- Win by KO: 1
- Losses: 0
- Draws: 0
- No contests: 0
Medal record
Men's amateur boxing
Representing Lithuania
Olympic Games
Bronze medal – third place	2012 London	Lightweight
European Championships
Bronze medal – third place	2017 Kharkiv	Light welterweight
AIBA Youth World Boxing Championships
Silver medal – second place	2010 Baku	Lightweight
Youth Olympics
Gold medal – first place	2010 Singapore	Lightweight

Evaldas Petrauskas (born 19 March 1992) is a Lithuanian boxer. He represented Lithuania at 2010 Summer Youth Olympics and won a gold medal.

At the 2011 World Amateur Boxing Championships he lost to Jai Bhagwan of India. He won the Olympic qualifier and went to the 2012 Summer Olympics in London. At the 2012 Summer Olympics he won a bronze medal in the men's lightweight division.

He competed in the 2016 Olympics but lost to Manoj Kumar in his first match.

On 22 September 2025, he was arrested for possession of illegal drugs and sentenced to 2 years in prison.

== Achievements ==
Year	Competition	Venue	Position	Notes
2010	Youth World Amateur Boxing Championships	Baku, Azerbaijan	2nd	
2010	Summer Youth Olympics	Singapore City, Singapore	1st	
2011	Lithuanian Championships	Kaunas, Lithuania	1st	
2012	Summer Olympics	London, Great Britain	3rd	
