= Tonga at the 1974 British Commonwealth Games =

- CG code: TON
- CGA: Tonga Sports Association and National Olympic Committee
- Website: oceaniasport.com/tonga

in Christchurch, New Zealand
- Medals: Gold 0 Silver 0 Bronze 0 Total 0

British Commonwealth Games appearances
- 1974; 1978; 1982; 1986; 1990; 1994; 1998; 2002; 2006; 2010; 2014; 2018; 2022; 2026; 2030

Tonga sent a delegation to the 1974 British Commonwealth Games in Christchurch. The 1974 Games marked the Pacific kingdom's first participation in the Commonwealth Games. Tonga fielded four representatives in athletics, six in boxing and two in shooting.

== Medals and results ==
	(gold)	(silver)	(bronze)	Total
Tonga	0	0	0	0

=== Athletics ===
- Uafu Tuineau finished last overall in the heats of the Women's 100m, with a time of 13.01 seconds.
- Keta Iongi finished last overall in the heats of the Women's 100m hurdles, with a time of 15.19 seconds.
- Uafu Tuineau finished last of heat 1 in the Women's 200m, with a time of 26.91 seconds, although she beat Jamaica's Rose Allwood, who failed to complete the race.
- Keta Iongi finished last of heat 2 in the Women's 200m, with a time of 25.67 seconds.
- Sanitesi Latu finished fifth out of thirteen in the men's decathlon, with a score of 7140 points.
- Losaline Faka'ata finished twelfth out of fourteen in the women's discus throw, with a result of 34.24m.
- Losaline Faka'ata finished sixteenth out of twenty in the women's shot put, with a result of 11.81m.

=== Boxing ===
- Sanipoi Naupoto failed to qualify for the final in the men's Featherweight Division (57 kg).
- Sione Pulu qualified for the finals but did not win a medal in the men's Heavyweight Division (91 kg).
- Talete Moala failed to qualify for the final in the men's Light heavyweight Division (81 kg).
- Solomone Namoa failed to qualify for the final in the men's Light Middleweight Division (71 kg).
- Matekihilia Lui failed to qualify for the final in the men's Light Welterweight Division (63.5 kg).
- Tupou Avatongo failed to qualify for the final in the men's Welterweight Division (67 kg).

=== Shooting ===
- Sesimani Fenukitau finished 27th out of 29 in the Fullbore Rifle Queen's Prize- Open, with a score of 232.13 points.
- Ha'angana Tau finished 29th in the same event.
