= Deepak Nehra =

Indian freestyle wrestler

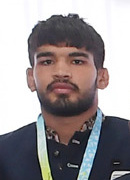
- Nehra in August 2022

Personal information
- Nationality: Indian
- Born: 1 January 2003 (age 23)
- Occupation: Wrestler
- Height: 182 cm (6 ft 0 in)

Sport
- Country: India
- Sport: Wrestling
- Event: Freestyle
Medal record
Men's Freestyle Wrestling
Representing India
Commonwealth Games
| Bronze medal – third place | 2022 Birmingham | 97 kg |

Deepak Nehra (born 1 January 2003) is an Indian freestyle wrestler, who competes in the 97 kg category. He won a bronze medal in the 2022 Birmingham Commonwealth Games.
