= Naveen Malik =

Indian freestyle wrestler

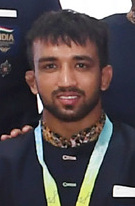
- Malik in August 2022

Personal information
- Born: 21 November 2002 (age 23)

Sport
- Country: India
- Sport: Amateur wrestling
- Event: Freestyle
- Coached by: Kuldeep Singh
Medal record
Men's freestyle wrestling
Representing India
Commonwealth Games
Gold medal – first place	2022 Birmingham	74 kg
Asian Championships
Bronze medal – third place	2022 Ulaanbaatar	70 kg

Naveen Malik (born 21 November 2002) is an Indian freestyle wrestler. He participated in the 2022 Commonwealth Games, winning the gold medal in the men's freestyle 74 kg. He defeated Muhammad Sharif Tahir of Pakistan in the finals with score 9–0.

He competed in the 70 kg event at the 2022 World Wrestling Championships held in Belgrade, Serbia.
