= Wrestling at the 2022 Commonwealth Games – Men's freestyle 74 kg =

Wrestling competition

Wrestling – Men's freestyle 74 kg at the 2022 Commonwealth Games
- Venue: Coventry Arena
- Dates: 6 August 2022
- Competitors: 15 from 15 nations

Medalists
gold medal	Naveen Malik	India
silver medal	Muhammad Sharif Tahir	Pakistan
bronze medal	Ogbonna John	Nigeria
bronze medal	Jasmit Phulka	Canada

The Men's freestyle 74 kg wrestling competitions at the 2022 Commonwealth Games in Birmingham, England took place on 6 August at the Coventry Arena. A total of 15 competitors from 15 nations took part.

This freestyle wrestling competition consists of a single-elimination tournament, with a repechage used to determine the winner of two bronze medals. The two finalists face off for gold and silver medals. Each wrestler who loses to one of the two finalists moves into the repechage, culminating in a pair of bronze medal matches featuring the semifinal losers each facing the remaining repechage opponent from their half of the bracket.

Shanith Chathuranga, a wrestler from Sri Lanka was scheduled to compete in the event, left the athletes village, and was believed to have fled.

== Results ==
The draw is as follows:

Legend

- F — Won by fall

=== Main bracket ===
Round of 16
Naveen Malik (IND)	13
Ogbonna John (NGR)	3
Arno van Zijl (RSA)	10
Curtis Dodge (WAL)	0
Thorn Demeritte (BAH)	0
Charlie Bowling (ENG)	10
Muhammad Sharif Tahir (PAK)	11
John Vake (TGA)	0
Jasmit Phulka (CAN)	7
Nicolae Cojocaru (SCO)	5
Cole Hawkins (NZL)	8
Mathayo Mahabila (KEN)	3
Jacob Ntuyo (UGA)	0
Mohamed Sesay (SLE)	10^{F}

Quarterfinals
Hong Yeow Lou (SGP)	0
Naveen Malik (IND)	10
Arno van Zijl (RSA)	2
Charlie Bowling (ENG)	4
Muhammad Sharif Tahir (PAK)	5
Jasmit Phulka (CAN)	1
Cole Hawkins (NZL)	9
Mohamed Sesay (SLE)	3

Semifinals
Naveen Malik (IND)	12
Charlie Bowling (ENG)	1
Muhammad Sharif Tahir (PAK)	11
Cole Hawkins (NZL)	0

Final
Naveen Malik (IND)	9
Muhammad Sharif Tahir (PAK)	0

=== Repechage ===
Repechage round
Ogbonna John (NGR)	10
Hong Yeow Lou (SGP)	0
John Vake (TGA)	0
Jasmit Phulka (CAN)	11

Bronze medal match
Ogbonna John (NGR)	10
Charlie Bowling (ENG)	0
Jasmit Phulka (CAN)	11
Cole Hawkins (NZL)	1
