= Han Soon-chul =

South Korean boxer (born 1984)

Personal information
- Nationality: South Korean
- Born: December 30, 1984 (age 41) Seoul, South Korea
- Height: 1.78 m (5 ft 10 in)
- Weight: 60 kg (130 lb)

Boxing career
Medal record
Summer Olympics
Silver medal – second place	2012 London	Lightweight
Asian Games
Silver medal – second place	2006 Doha	Bantamweight
Bronze medal – third place	2010 Guangzhou	Lightweight

Han Soon-Chul (Korean pronunciation: [han.sun.tɕʰʌl]; born December 30, 1984) is an amateur boxer from South Korea who won a silver medal at the 2012 Summer Olympics, and competed at the 2006 Asian Games in the Bantamweight (-54 kg) division, winning the silver medal. At the 2010 Asian Games, he won a bronze medal in the lightweight (-60 kg) division.

== Career ==
At the 2006 Asian Games he beat Mongolia's Enkhbatyn Badar-Uugan but lost against Joan Tipon of the Philippines.

At the World Championships in 2007 he lost early to Ukrainian Maxim Tretyak.

At the second Olympic qualifier for the 2008 Summer Olympics, he lost to Hurshid Tajibayev but beat Dinesh Kumara Mahju for the all-important third place to qualify for the Beijing Olympics. He lost his first Olympic match to Héctor Manzanilla 6:17.

Having moved up to the lightweight category, Han qualified for the 2012 Summer Olympics. He beat Mohamed Ramadan, Vazgen Safaryants, Fazliddin Gaibnazarov and Evaldas Petrauskas before losing to Vasyl Lomachenko in the final.
