= Jesse Ross =

Australian boxer

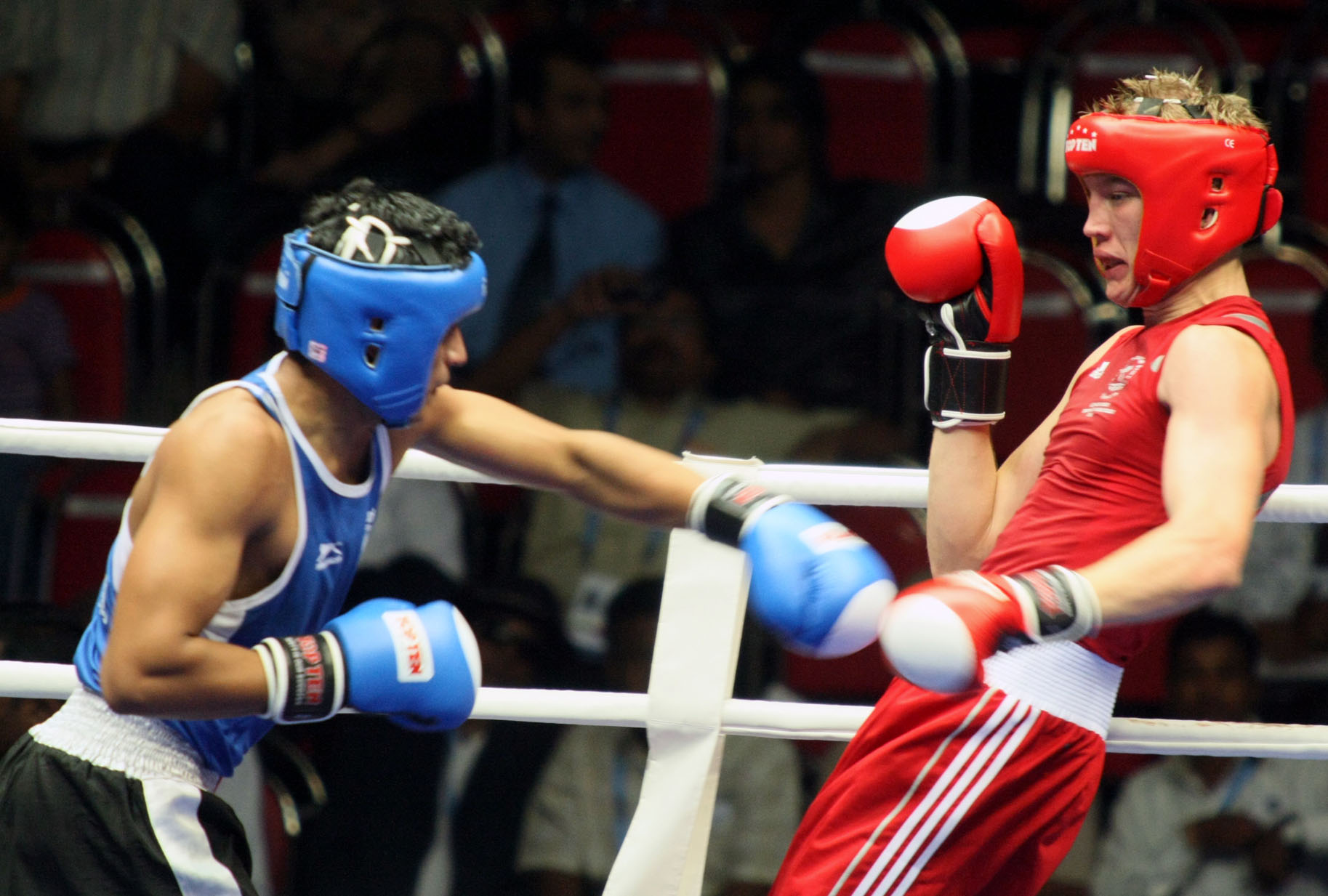
- Ross Jesse (Red) at 2008 Commonwealth Youth Games

Personal information
- Full name: Jesse Ross
- Nickname: JR
- Nationality: Australia
- Born: 9 February 1990 (age 36) Brisbane, Queensland
- Height: 1.88 m (6 ft 2 in)
- Weight: 76 kg (168 lb)

Sport
- Sport: Boxing
- Weight class: Middleweight
- Club: Nerang PCYC

Jesse Ross (born 9 February 1990 in Brisbane, Queensland) is an Australian amateur boxer selected for the 2012 Summer Olympics in the middleweight division.

== Career ==
Ross has alternated between the welterweight and middleweight categories during his career. He won a bronze medal at the 2008 Youth Commonwealth Games in Pune, India fighting as a welterweight. He went up to middleweight in 2009, and back to welterweight in 2010 where he made the Australian team that toured Europe in 2011. Poor results on that tour saw him step up to middleweight again, where he claimed the Australian and Oceanian titles and a place at the London Olympics.

He described the move to the heavier weight division as a "no-brainer". He said that at 188 cm tall, keeping his weight below 69 kg didn't leave him enough energy to fight.

At the 2012 Olympics, he lost in the first round to Abdelmalek Rahou.

== Personal ==
Ross's girlfriend Jessica Rettalack is also a boxer hoping to make the Olympic team. He is recognized in the Australian Olympic Committee list of Australian Indigenous Olympians.
