= Wrestling at the 2022 Commonwealth Games – Men's freestyle 97 kg =

Wrestling competition

Wrestling – Men's freestyle 97 kg at the 2022 Commonwealth Games
- Venue: Coventry Arena
- Dates: 6 August 2022
- Competitors: 9 from 9 nations

Medalists
gold medal	Nishan Randhawa	Canada
silver medal	Nicolaas de Lange	South Africa
bronze medal	Deepak Nehra	India
bronze medal	Thomas Barns	Australia

The Men's freestyle 97 kg wrestling competitions at the 2022 Commonwealth Games in Birmingham, England took place on 6 August at the Coventry Arena. A total of nine competitors from nine nations took part.

This freestyle wrestling competition consists of a single-elimination tournament, with a repechage used to determine the winner of two bronze medals. The two finalists face off for gold and silver medals. Each wrestler who loses to one of the two finalists moves into the repechage, culminating in a pair of bronze medal matches featuring the semifinal losers each facing the remaining repechage opponent from their half of the bracket.

== Results ==
The draw is as follows:

Legend

- F — Won by fall

=== Main bracket ===
Round of 16
Tayab Raza (PAK)	10
Rashji Mackey (BAH)	0

Quarterfinals
Cameron Nicol (SCO)	0
Tayab Raza (PAK)	10
Nishan Randhawa (CAN)	8
Deepak Nehra (IND)	6
Sione Sika (TGA)	0
Maulalo Alofipo (SAM)	11
Thomas Barns (AUS)	0
Nicolaas de Lange (RSA)	10

Semifinals
Tayab Raza (PAK)	0
Nishan Randhawa (CAN)	7
Maulalo Alofipo (SAM)	0
Nicolaas de Lange (RSA)	10

Final
Nishan Randhawa (CAN)	9
Nicolaas de Lange (RSA)	3

=== Repechage ===
Bronze medal matches
Deepak Nehra (IND)	10
Tayab Raza (PAK)	2
Thomas Barns (AUS)	12
Maulalo Alofipo (SAM)	0
