= Johan Linde =

Australian boxer

Johan 'Ice Man’ Linde
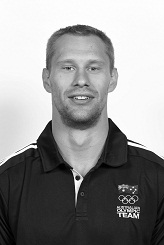
- 2012 Australian Olympic Team

Personal information
- Full name: Johan Tanel Linde
- Nicknames: Ice Man, The Number Cruncher, Drago
- Nationality: Australian
- Born: 27 June 1983 (age 43) Adelaide, South Australia
- Height: 1.99 m (6 ft 6 in)
- Weight: 102 kg (225 lb)

Sport
- Sport: Boxing
- Weight class: Super Heavyweight
- Club: ASG Boxing Club (Adelaide, SA) Lift & Box Artarmon (Sydney, NSW)

Johan ‘Ice Man’ Linde (born 27 June 1983 in Adelaide, South Australia) is an Australian boxer of Estonian descent. He represented Australia at the 2012 London Olympic Games in the super heavyweight division. He is the current Australian National Boxing Federation South Australian Heavyweight champion.

== Career ==
He started boxing at the age of 15 at the ASG Boxing Club in Adelaide under the tutelage of Colin Betty and Paul Totalis Snr. Mick Campion took over as head coach and prepared Johan for the 2012 Australian Titles and 2012 Oceania Championships, which he won and booked at spot on the 2012 London Olympic Team. Other coaches involved with him were Paul Panos, Mick Daly, Nermin Sabanovic and Gerry Murphy.

His amateur boxing record for 68 fights is 57 wins with 32 KOs and 11 losses. Some notable opponents include Anthony Joshua (2012 A.Socikas Tournament, Lithuania), Joseph Parker (2012 Belgrade Winner Tournament, Serbia), Junior Fa (2012 Oceania Championships) and Joe Goodall (2013 and 2014 Australian Championships).

He holds degrees in economics and commerce with a major in accounting from the University of Adelaide and had a career in government finance before being appointed economic advisor to the NSW Premier Dominic Perrottet in 2020. He was also a director of Boxing Australia for four years.

=== Amateur boxing ===
Linde started boxing in 2001 and was crowned South Australian heavyweight (91 kg) champion in 2003 and 2004. However, in 2005 he gave up boxing to pursue tertiary studies, work, and starring as centre back for the FC Mendozza in the Adelaide Lunchtime Premier League.

In 2009, Linde returned to the boxing gym and fought competitively for the first time in six years in 2010, moving up to the super heavyweight division (+91 kg). Linde went on to win the 2012 Australian and regional 2012 Oceania titles to qualify for the 2012 London Olympics, beating the highly rated Tongan Junior Fa in the final, who in turn had beaten Joseph Parker in the semi-final. This was his first time Linde had represented Australia at an international tournament.

In the lead up to the London Olympic Games, Linde fought |Joseph Parker in the 2012 Belgrade Winner final, narrowly losing on a countback. One week later, Linde suffered a TKO against Anthony Joshua at the 2012 A. Socikas Tournament in Lithuania, the first stoppage in his career.

Linde lost in the round of 16 at the London Olympics to Chinese super heavyweight Zhilei Zhang, who was the silver medallist at the 2008 Beijing Olympics in the same weight division. After reaching the world level in amateur boxing, Linde wasn't able to penetrate into the top of the amateur ranks, losing his first fight to Uzbekistan at the 2013 World Boxing Championships in Kazakhstan and only winning a bronze medal at the 2014 Australian Titles, losing to Joseph Goodall in the semi-final. He was Australian team captain at the 2013 World Amateur Boxing Championships in Almaty, Kazakhstan.

Linde retired from amateur boxing in 2014 to resume his career and was active in helping boxers with both training and promotion. He was also a director of Boxing Australia, chairman of the Boxing Australia Athletes Commission and National Federation representative for boxing with the Australian Olympic Committee.

=== Professional boxing ===
After the Perrottet Liberal Government was defeated at the 2023 New South Wales state election, Johan turned professional with his first fight against Parminder Singh (TKO Rd 2) in June 2023.

In February 2024, he won Australian National Boxing Federation South Australian Heavyweight Title against Michael Koko (TKO Round 4) in Adelaide.

He fought for the Australian National Boxing Federation Australasian Heavyweight Title against Stevan Ivic (Split draw) in Southport, Queensland.

== Titles and medals ==
- ANBF South Australian Heavyweight title (February 2024)
- 8x Australian caps including 2012 London Olympic Games and 2013 World Amateur Boxing Championships
- 2012 Oceania Champion
- 2012 Australian Champion
- 2x Australian Titles Silver medal (2003, 2013)
- 2014 Australian Titles Bronze medal
- 6x South Australian Champion (2003, 2004, 2010, 2011, 2012, 2013)
