= Mandhir Kooner =

British freestyle wrestler (born 1995)

Personal information
- Full name: Mandhir Singh Kooner
- Nationality: British (English)
- Born: 27 September 1995 (age 30) Wolverhampton, England
- Height: 180.0 cm (5 ft 11 in)
- Weight: 115 kg (254 lb)

Sport
- Sport: Wrestling
- Weight class: 125 kg
Medal record
Men's freestyle wrestling
Representing England
Commonwealth Games
Bronze medal – third place	2022 Birmingham	125 kg

Mandhir Singh Kooner (born 27 September 1995) is an English international freestyle wrestler. He has represented England at the Commonwealth Games and won a bronze medal.

== Biography ==
In 2018, Kooner won a silver medal at the English Championships, beaten by Ben Pollin in the heavyweight category but gained revenge in 2022, when he won the Championships.

In 2022, he was selected for the 2022 Commonwealth Games in Birmingham where he competed in the men's 125 kg category, winning the bronze medal.
