= Zaman Anwar =

Pakistani professional wrestler

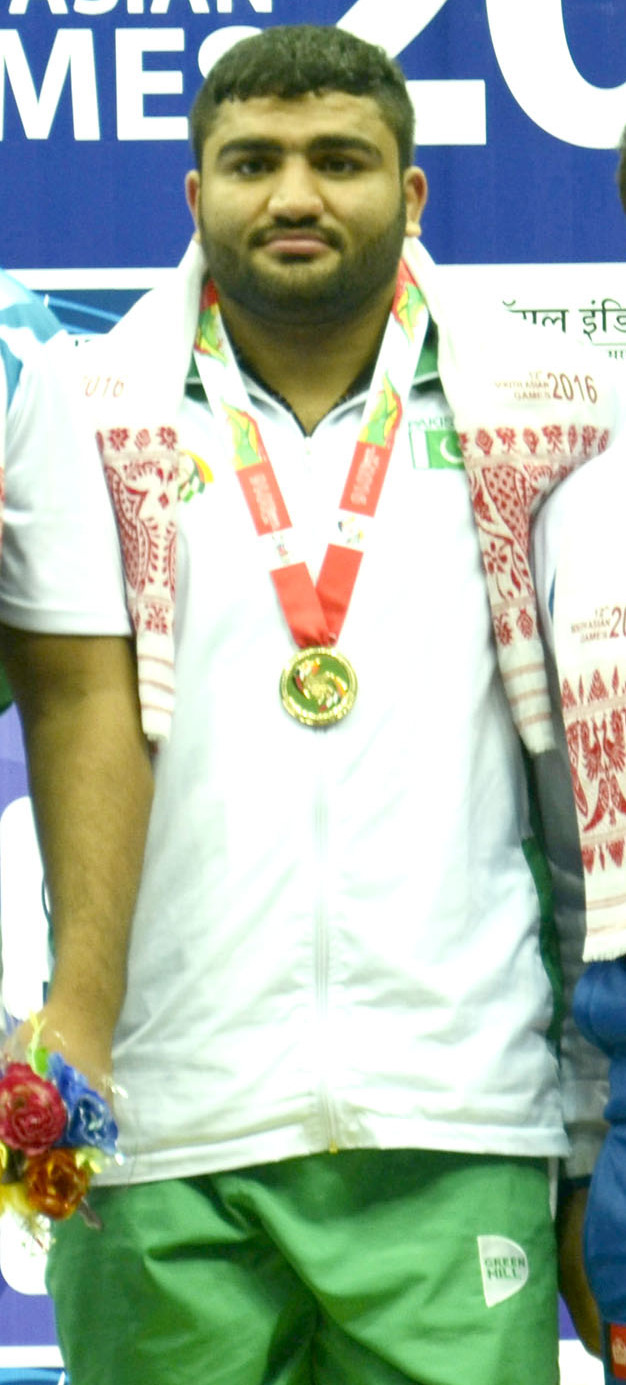
- Zaman Anwar with his gold medal at the 2016 South Asian Games

Personal information
- Nationality: (Pakistan) Pakistani
- Born: 20 June 1991 (age 35) Gujranwala, Punjab, Pakistan

Sport
- Country: Pakistan
- Sport: Wrestling
- Event: Freestyle wrestling
Medal record
Representing Pakistan
Event	1st	2nd	3rd
Commonwealth Games	–	1	–
South Asian Games	1	–	–
Total	1	1	0
Commonwealth Games
Silver medal – second place	2022 Birmingham	Freestyle (125kg)
South Asian Games
Gold medal – first place	2016 India	Freestyle (125kg)

Zaman Anwar is a Pakistani professional wrestler. He won gold at the 2016 South Asian Games and won a silver medal at the 2022 Commonwealth Games. He participated at the 2014 Commonwealth Games.
