= Magan Maka =

New Zealand - Tongan boxer

Personal information
- Born: 29 December 1993; Auckland, New Zealand

Sport
- Country: New Zealand / Tonga
- Sport: Boxing

Magan Maka (born 29 December 1993) is a Tongan New Zealander boxer who has represented both New Zealand and Tonga at the Commonwealth Games.

Maka was born in Auckland, New Zealand, and educated at Rodney College in Wellsford. She began boxing at the age of 11, training against boys as there were no girls to train with. At the age of 16 she competed in the 2010 Oceania Boxing Championships and the 2010 AIBA Women's World Boxing Championships in Barbados. She then contested the 2011 world championships in Turkey.

In May 2014 she was selected for the New Zealand team for the 2014 Commonwealth Games.

In 2018 she was selected as flagbearer for the Tongan team at the 2018 Commonwealth Games. She lost to Wales' Rosie Eccles in the quarterfinals.
