= Mohit Grewal =

Indian freestyle wrestler

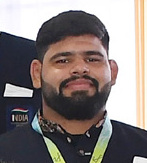
- Grewal in August 2022

Personal information
- Nationality: Indian
- Born: 20 December 1999 (age 26) Bamla, Bhiwani, Haryana, India
- Occupation: Wrestler
- Height: 1.67 m (5 ft 6 in)
- Weight: 125 kg (276 lb)

Sport
- Country: India
- Sport: Wrestling
- Event: Freestyle
Medal record
Men's Freestyle Wrestling
Representing India
Event	1st	2nd	3rd
Commonwealth Games	-	-	1
Total	0	0	1
Commonwealth Games
Bronze medal – third place	2022 Birmingham	125 kg
Grand Prix
Bronze medal – third place	2022 Almaty	125 kg

Mohit Grewal (born 20 December 1999) is an Indian freestyle wrestler, who competes in the 125 kg category. He won a bronze medal in the 2022 Birmingham Commonwealth Games.

== Career ==
=== 2022 Commonwealth Games ===
After a win against Alexios Kaoslidis of Cyprus in the Quarterfinals, he was knocked out by Amarveer Dhesi of Canada in the Semi-Finals. Grewal then went on to win the bronze medal in the bronze medal match against Aaron Johnson of Jamaica.

== International competitions ==
=== Commonwealth Games ===
Year	Competition	Venue	Event	Rank
2022	2022 Commonwealth Games	Birmingham	125kg	3rd place, bronze medalist(s)
