= Wrestling at the 2022 Commonwealth Games – Men's freestyle 125 kg =

Wrestling competition

Wrestling – Men's freestyle 125 kg at the 2022 Commonwealth Games
- Venue: Coventry Arena
- Dates: 5 August 2022
- Competitors: 10 from 10 nations

Medalists
gold medal	Amar Dhesi	Canada
silver medal	Zaman Anwar	Pakistan
bronze medal	Mandhir Kooner	England
bronze medal	Mohit Grewal	India

The Men's freestyle 125 kg wrestling competitions at the 2022 Commonwealth Games in Birmingham, England took place on 5 August at the Coventry Arena. A total of ten competitors from ten nations took part.

This freestyle wrestling competition consists of a single-elimination tournament, with a repechage used to determine the winner of two bronze medals. The two finalists face off for gold and silver medals. Each wrestler who loses to one of the two finalists moves into the repechage, culminating in a pair of bronze medal matches featuring the semifinal losers each facing the remaining repechage opponent from their half of the bracket.

== Results ==
The draw is as follows:

Legend

- F — Won by fall

=== Main bracket ===
Round of 16
Aaron Lehauli (TGA)	3
Mandhir Kooner (ENG)	13
Aaron Johnson (JAM)	11
Liton Biswas (BAN)	0

Quarterfinals
Mohamed Bundu (SLE)	1
Mandhir Kooner (ENG)	4^{F}
Zaman Anwar (PAK)	12^{F}
Kensley Marie (MRI)	0
Mohit Grewal (IND)	10
Alexios Kaouslidis (CYP)	1
Aaron Johnson (JAM)	0
Amar Dhesi (CAN)	10

Semifinals
Mandhir Kooner (ENG)	0
Zaman Anwar (PAK)	5^{F}
Mohit Grewal (IND)	2
Amar Dhesi (CAN)	12

Final
Zaman Anwar (PAK)	2
Amar Dhesi (CAN)	9^{F}

=== Repechage ===
Bronze medal matches
Kensley Marie (MRI)	0
Mandhir Kooner (ENG)	4^{F}
Aaron Johnson (JAM)	0
Mohit Grewal (IND)	6^{F}
