= Yasniel Toledo =

Cuban boxer (born 1989)

Yasnier Toledo
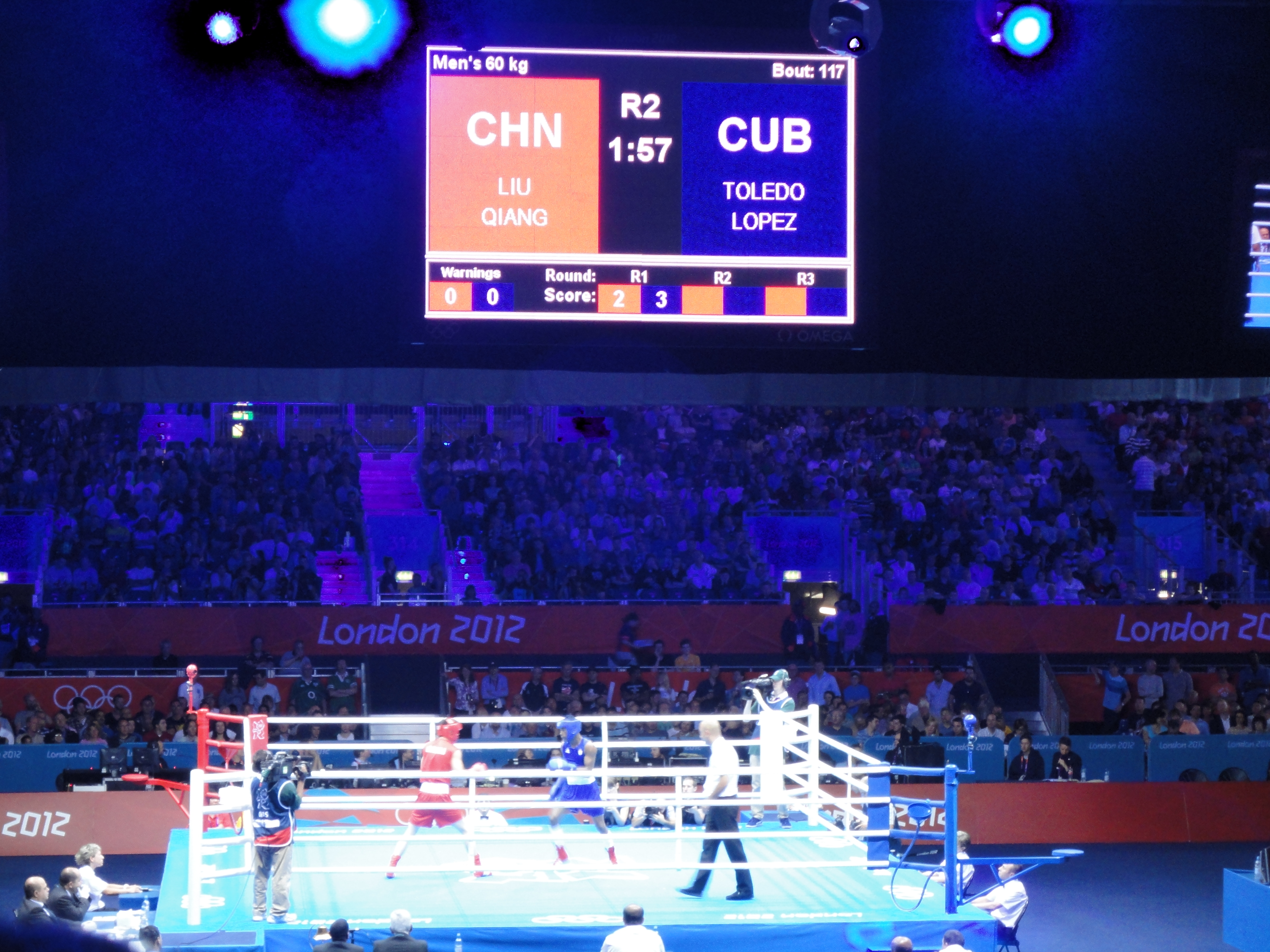
- Round of 16 bout against Liu Qiang (red) at the 2012 Summer Olympics

Personal information
- Full name: Yasnier Toledo López
- Born: September 15, 1989 (age 37) Camagüey, Cuba
- Height: 1.75 m (5 ft 9 in)
Medal record
Men's amateur boxing
Representing Cuba
Olympic Games
Bronze medal – third place	2012 London	Lightweight
World Amateur Championships
Silver medal – second place	2011 Baku	Lightweight
Silver medal – second place	2013 Almaty	Light welterweight
Bronze medal – third place	2015 Doha	Light welterweight
Pan American Games
Gold medal – first place	2011 Guadalajara	Lightweight
Central American and Caribbean Games
Gold medal – first place	2014 Veracruz	Light welterweight

Yasnier Toledo López (born 15 September 1989 in Camagüey) is a Cuban amateur boxer from Pinar del Río who won the bronze medal at the 2012 Summer Olympics and the PanAm lightweight title in 2011. He is a southpaw.

== Career ==
After winning the 52 kg Under-17 world title in 2005, the following year López lost in the final to Russia's Vladimir Saruhanyan.

As a senior, he stood in the shadows of the near-invincible Guillermo Rigondeaux but when Rigondeaux did not participate in 2007 he won the 54 kg national championships against Yankiel León and the international tournament Ahmet Comert Cup.

In 2008 when Rigondeaux was suspended by the Cuban authorities, Toledo was defeated by veteran León at the Cuban national championships and therefore León was selected to be Cuba's representative in the 54 kg division.

In 2009 Toledo moved to featherweight and lost the national final to Ivan Onate. Toledo won the Cuban nationals in his division every year from 2010 to 2015.

In 2011 he became silver medalist at the World Championships after losing to Ukraine's Vasyl Lomachenko, later in the year he beat Brazil's Robson Conceição to win the PanAm Games.

At the 2012 Summer Olympics, he beat Liu Qiang and Gani Zhaylauov before losing his semifinal match to Lomachenko. Through his performance Toledo won a bronze medal.

At the 2013 World Championships, he competed as a light welterweight, winning the silver medal, losing in the final to Merey Ashkalov. He won bronze in the same division at the 2015 World Championships. At the 2016 Olympics, he beat Pat McCormack before losing to eventual silver medalist Lorenzo Sotomayor.
