= Shōta Nakayama =

Japanese baseball player (born 1996)

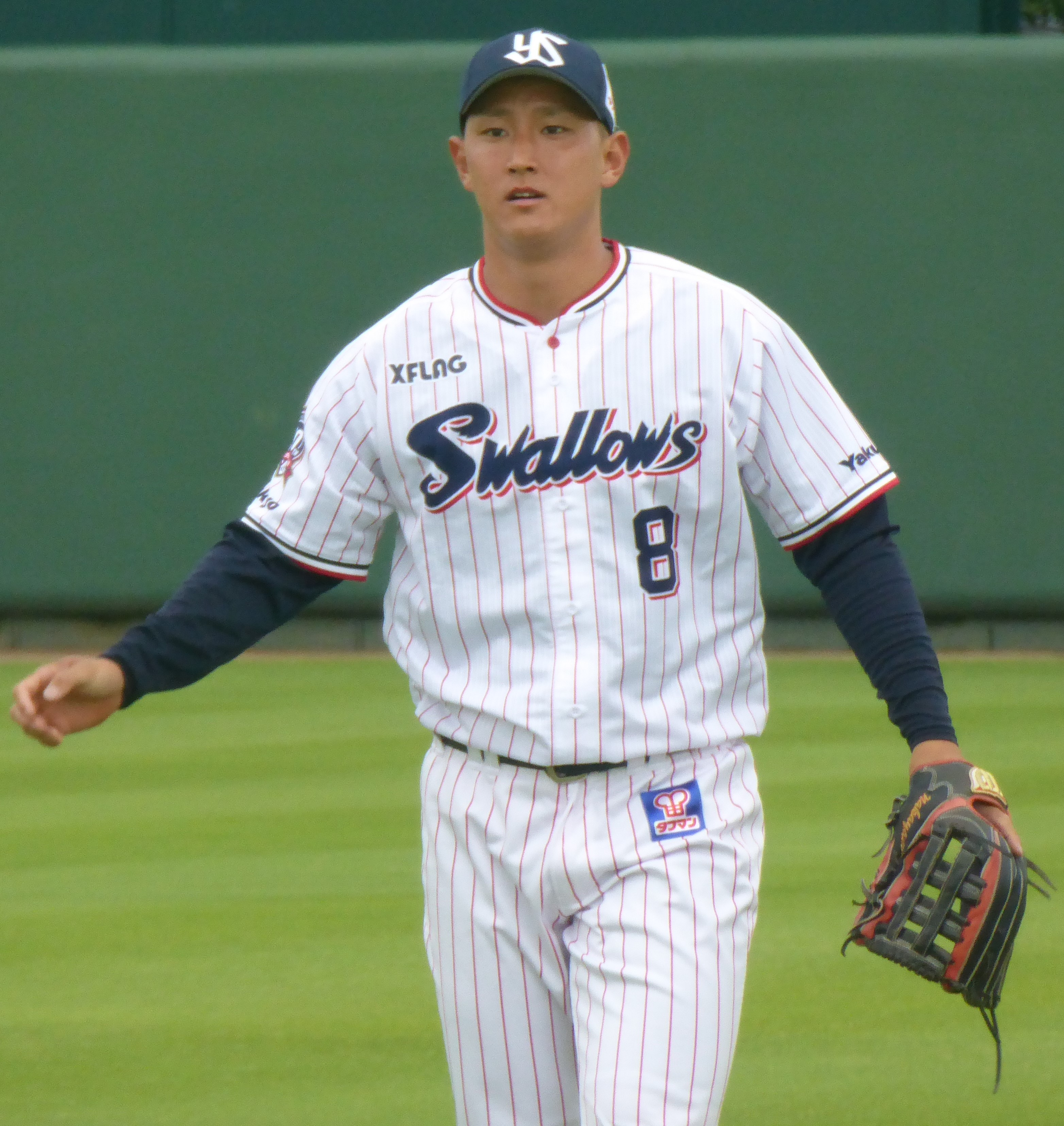

Oisix Niigata Albirex – No. 37
- Outfielder
- Born: September 22, 1996 (age 29); Osaka, Osaka, Japan
- Bats: Right Throws: Right

NPB debut
- June 9, 2019, for the Tokyo Yakult Swallows

Career statistics (through 2022 season)
- Batting average: .256
- Hits: 40
- Home runs: 9
- Runs batted in: 23
- Stolen bases: 0
- Stats at Baseball Reference

Teams
- Tokyo Yakult Swallows (2019–2022)

Shōta Nakayama (中山 翔太, Nakayama Shōta; born September 22, 1996 in Osaka, Osaka, Japan) is a professional Japanese baseball player. He plays outfielder for the Tokyo Yakult Swallows.
