= Gani Zhailauov =

Kazakhstani boxer

Gani Zhailauov (born 3 August 1985) is an amateur boxer from Kazakhstan who fought at lightweight (-60 kg) at the 2012 Olympics.

At the 2011 World Amateur Boxing Championships he won a bronze medal, after losing the semifinal to Cuban Yasniel Toledo. BY reaching the semi-finals he qualified for the Olympics.

At the London Olympics, he had major problems in a 12:12 countback win over Thailand's Saylom Ardee who complained bitterly, then defeated India's Jai Bhagwan 16:8. In the quarter-finals, he again lost to Toledo.
