= Sailom Adi =

Thai boxer (born 1986)

Personal information
- Nationality: Thai
- Born: 7 July 1986 (age 39) Ban Phai District, Khon Kaen Province, Thailand

Sport
- Sport: Boxing
- Weight class: Welterweight
Medal record
Men's amateur boxing
Representing Thailand
Asian Games
Bronze medal – third place	2018 Jakarta/Palembang	Welterweight
Southeast Asian Games
Gold medal – first place	2007 Nakhon Ratchasima	Featherweight
Gold medal – first place	2009 Vientiane	Featherweight
Bronze medal – third place	2011 Jakarta/Palembang	Lightweight
Bronze medal – third place	2015 Singapore	Lightweight

Sailom Adi (Thai: สายลม อาดี, pronounced [sǎːj.lōm ʔāːdīː], also known as Saylom Ardee, born 7 July 1986 at Ban Phai District, Khon Kaen Province) is a Thai amateur boxer who competed at featherweight at the 2008 Olympics and at lightweight at the 2012 London Olympics. He got Master of Social Sciences from Thongsook College.

At the 2008 Summer Olympics, he had a bye through to the second round where he lost to Abdelkader Chadi of Algeria.

At the 2012 Olympics he controversially lost his first bout against Kazakhstan's Gani Zhailauov 12:12 on countback.
