= John Vake =

Tongan MMA fighter and wrestler

- Born: John Taufa Vake; June 15, 1991 (age 35); Auckland, New Zealand
- Height: 6 ft 0 in (1.83 m)
- Weight: 170 lb (77 kg; 12 st)
- Division: Light Heavyweight; Middleweight; Welterweight
- Style: Wrestling
- Fighting out of: Auckland, New Zealand
- Team: City Kickboxing
- Years active: 2012–present

Mixed martial arts record
- Total: 24
- Wins: 14
- By knockout: 4
- By submission: 4
- By decision: 6
- Losses: 10
- By knockout: 3
- By submission: 1
- By decision: 6

Other information
- Mixed martial arts record from Sherdog

John Taufa Vake (born 15 June 1991) is a Tongan New Zealander pro-mixed martial arts fighter and wrestler, who has represented Tonga at the Commonwealth Games.

== Background ==
Vake was born in Auckland, New Zealand and educated at Kelston Boys' High School. He took up wrestling after failing to get into the school rugby team. His first professional MMA fight was in 2012. In 2018, he opened a fight club in Auckland to help troubled youth. He also runs a Whānau Ora-funded program for Kelston Boys' High School students.

In 2022 he was selected for the Tongan team for the 2022 Commonwealth Games in Birmingham, England. He was defeated in the first round by Muhammad Sharif Tahir.

== Mixed martial arts record ==
Professional record breakdown
24 matches	14 wins	10 losses
By knockout	4	3
By submission	4	1
By decision	6	6

Res.	Record	Opponent	Method	Event	Date	Round	Time	Location	Notes
Loss	14–10	Alfred Stoddart	Decision (unanimous)	Shuriken Fight Series 19	7 December 2024	5	5:00	Auckland, New Zealand	For the Shuriken MMA Middleweight Championship.
Loss	14–9	Lachlan Stitt	Submission (rear-naked choke)	Eternal MMA 86	22 June 2024	5	1:48	Gold Coast, Australia	For the vacant Eternal MMA Welterweight Championship.
Win	14–7	James Craughwell	TKO (punches)	Shuriken Fight Series 17	20 April 2024	2	2:41	Auckland, New Zealand	Light Heavyweight bout.
Loss	14–8	J.J. Ambrose	Decision (split)	Shuriken Fight Series 15	17 July 2023	5	5:00	Auckland, New Zealand	For the Shuriken MMA Welterweight Championship.
Win	13–7	Daniel Kerr	TKO (punches)	XFC 64	15 April 2023	1	N/A	Dunedin, New Zealand	
Loss	12–7	Aldin Bates	Decision (split)	Eternal MMA 73	11 February 2023	3	5:00	Perth, Australia	
Win	12–6	Andrew Mills	Decision (unanimous)	Eternal MMA 68	20 August 2022	3	5:00	Perth, Australia	
Loss	11–6	Saeid Fatahifar	KO (punches)	Wollongong Wars 7	12 July 2019	2	N/A	Gwynneville, Australia	For the Wollongong Wars Welterweight Championship.
Loss	11–5	Park Jun-yong	TKO (punches)	HEX Fight Series 13	23 March 2018	2	2:14	Melbourne, Australia	
Win	11–4	Stephen Walton	Submission (arm-triangle choke)	HEX Fight Series 12	24 November 2017	1	4:25	Melbourne, Australia	
Loss	10–4	Kitt Campbell	Decision (unanimous)	HEX Fight Series 10	29 July 2017	5	5:00	Perth, Australia	For the vacant HEX Welterweight Championship.
Win	10–3	Liu Huanan	Submission (guillotine choke)	Chin Woo Men: 2016-2017 Season, Stage 6	19 February 2017	1	1:27	Guangzhou, China	
Win	9–3	Sergey Lesnikov	Decision (unanimous)	World Kings Glory MMA	6 January 2017	3	5:00	Harbin, China	
Win	8–3	Zhang Mingyang	KO (punches)	Kunlun Fight: Cage Fight Series 6	21 October 2016	1	2:18	Yiwu, China	Catchweight (190 lb) bout.
Loss	7–3	B.J. Bland	Decided (split)	Shuriken MMA: Island Wars	28 November 2015	3	5:00	Auckland, New Zealand	For the Shuriken MMA Welterweight Championship.
Win	7–2	Beau Rawiri	Decision (unanimous)	Fair Pay Fighting 1	5 September 2015	3	5:00	Auckland, New Zealand	
Win	6–2	Brogan Anderson	Decision (unanimous)	Hammerhead MMA Fight Night 16	23 May 2015	3	5:00	Dunedin, New Zealand	Return to Welterweight. Won the Hammerhead MMA Welterweight Championship.
Win	5–2	Naruaedon Keewkaew	TKO (punches)	Chiang Mai FC 4	26 July 2014	1	1:27	Chiang Mai, Thailand	Light Heavyweight debut.
Win	4–2	Oh Jae-sung	Decision (unanimous)	PRO Fighting 9	25 May 2014	3	5:00	Taipei, Taiwan	Welterweight debut.
Loss	3–2	Israel Adesanya	TKO (punches)	Shuriken MMA: Best of the Best	5 June 2013	1	4:43	Auckland, New Zealand	
Win	3–1	Maikara Potae	Submission (guillotine choke)	Farquhar Fight Night	4 May 2013	1	1:00	Auckland, New Zealand	
Loss	2–1	Julian Matenga	Decision (unanimous)	Combined Combat Inc.: Rising Stars	9 November 2012	3	5:00	Auckland, New Zealand	
Win	2–0	Eva Almente	Submission (rear-naked choke)	Autorea MMA Expo	3 November 2012	1	1:59	Auckland, New Zealand	
Win	1–0	Brent Tumoana Shadbolt	Decision (unanimous)	Supremacy FC 9	24 March 2012	3	5:00	Auckland, New Zealand	Middleweight debut.
