= Mohamed Ramadan (boxer) =

Egyptian boxer (born 1986)

Mohamed Ramadan Mohamed Eliwa (born 23 August 1986, Alexandria) is an Egyptian boxer. At the 2012 Summer Olympics, he competed in the Men's lightweight, but was defeated in the first round.
