= Muhammad Sharif Tahir =

Pakistani wrestler (born 2002)

Personal information
- Born: 12 June 2002 (age 24) Pakistan
- Height: 174 cm (5 ft 9 in)

Sport
- Country: Pakistan
- Sport: Wrestling
- Weight class: 74 kg
- Event: Freestyle wrestling
Medal record
Men's freestyle wrestling
Representing Pakistan
Event	1st	2nd	3rd
Commonwealth Games	–	1	–
Total	0	1	0
Commonwealth Games
Silver medal – second place	2022 Birmingham	74 kg

Muhammad Sharif Tahir (born 12 June 2002) is a Pakistani wrestler. He competed at the 2022 Commonwealth Games, winning the silver medal in the men's freestyle 74 kg event. He was defeated in the final by Naveen Malik.
