= Jai Bhagwan (boxer) =

Indian boxer

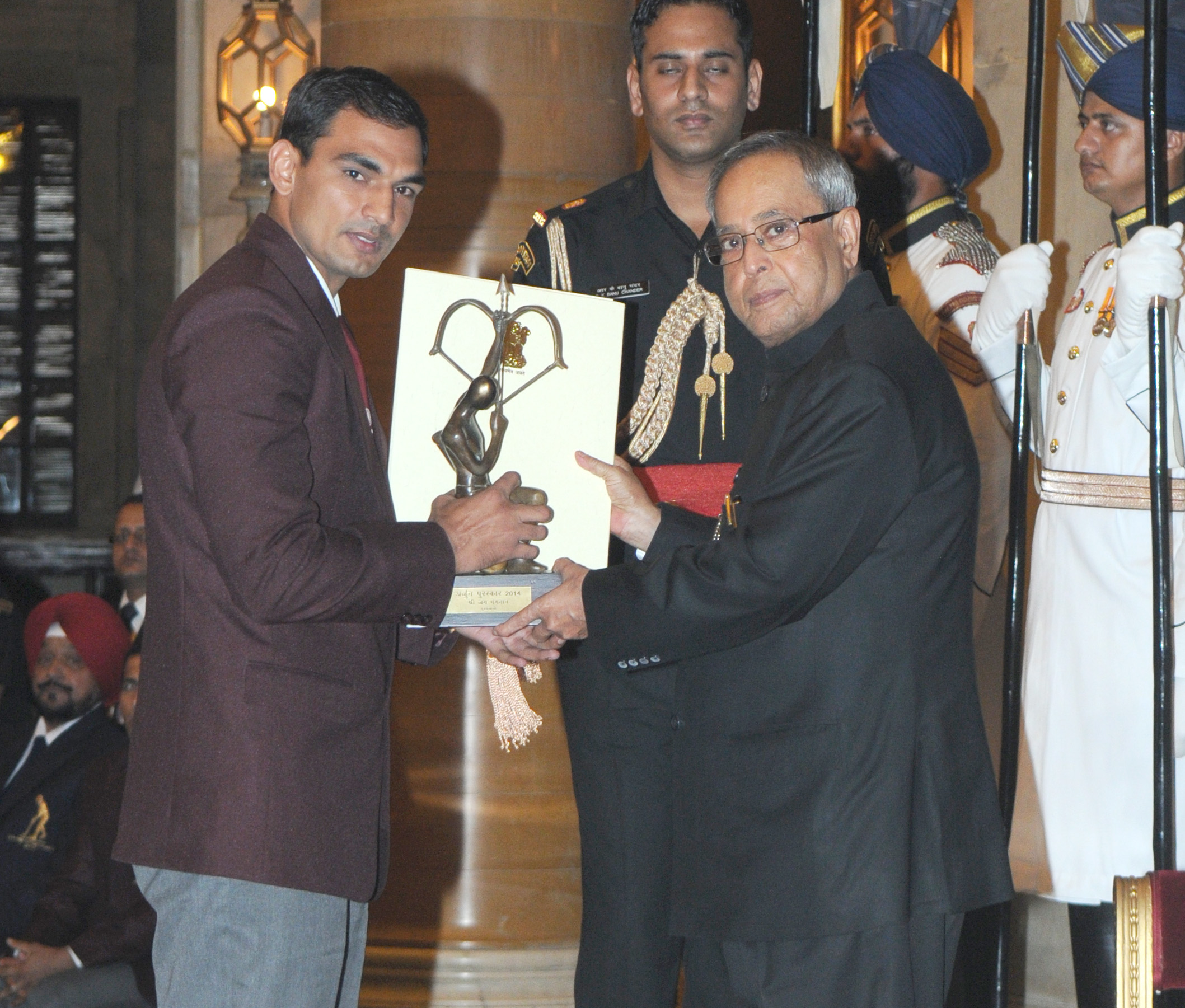
- Bhagwan (left) receiving the Arjuna Award in 2014

Personal information
- Nationality: Indian
- Born: 11 May 1985 (age 41) Hisar district, Haryana, India
- Height: 169 cm (5 ft 7 in)
- Weight: 60 kg (132 lb)

Sport
- Sport: Boxing
- Weight class: Lightweight
Medal record
Men's Boxing
Representing India
Commonwealth Games
Bronze medal – third place	2010 delhi	Lightweight

Jai Bhagwan (born 11 May 1985), is a two-time Asian Championships medallist and a bronze winner at the 2010 Commonwealth Games who also represented India in boxing in the lightweight (60 kg) division at the 2012 London Olympics.

Bhagwan qualified for the London Games by reaching the quarterfinals of the 2011 World Amateur Boxing Championships in Baku. He was coached by the Indian Boxing Coach Gurbaksh Singh Sandhu.

In 2011, he appeared in a reality game show hosted by Shahrukh Khan called Zor Ka Jhatka: Total Wipeout and was one of the finalists.

At the 2012 Summer Olympics, he defeated Andrique Allisop of Seychelles 18–8 in the opening round on 29 July 2012. On 2 August 2012, Bhagwan was defeated by Kazakh fighter Gani Zhailauov in the last 16.
