= Junior Fa =

New Zealand boxer (born 1989)

Personal information
- Born: Uaine Fa Jr. 19 October 1989 (age 37) Papakura, New Zealand
- Height: 196 cm (6 ft 5 in)
- Weight: Heavyweight

Boxing career
- Reach: 204 cm (80 in)
- Stance: Orthodox

Boxing record
- Total fights: 23
- Wins: 20
- Win by KO: 11
- Losses: 3
Medal record
Men's amateur boxing
Representing Tonga
Commonwealth Games
| Bronze medal – third place | 2010 Delhi | Super heavyweight |
Oceanian Championships
| Silver medal – second place | 2008 Apia | Super heavyweight |
| Gold medal – first place | 2010 Canberra | Super heavyweight |
| Silver medal – second place | 2012 Canberra | Super heavyweight |

Uaine Fa Junior (born 19 October 1989) is a New Zealand former professional boxer. As an amateur he represented Tonga at the 2010 Commonwealth Games, winning a bronze medal in the super-heavyweight division; he also represented Tonga at the Oceania Championships, winning gold and multiple silver medals.

== Amateur career ==
For much of his amateur career, Fa began under the guidance of coach and trainer Lolo Heimuli. Heimuli brought Fa to his Balmoral Lee Gar Gym in 2006 after discovering his coach failed to show at his first amateur fight. Being born and raised in Papakura, New Zealand, Fa decided to represent Tonga as an amateur. He was the flag bearer for Tonga on two occasions at the Commonwealth Games.

At the Oceanian Amateur Boxing Championships, Fa featured in three consecutive events. In 2008 in Apia, Samoa he won a silver medal. Fa fought for a qualification spot and progression into the 2008 Summer Olympics. He began with a points decision victory over New Zealand senior North Island champion, Isikeli Maama in the quarter-finals. He followed up with another win over Australian Steven Rudic before losing out to Daniel Beahan on points in the final to gain gold. During 2010, Fa return home with a gold medal from the tournament held in Canberra. He controlled an emphatic win over the host nations, Alexey Mukhin. Establishing himself an 8–1 score in his favor. He again had a chance to make it to the Olympics after having to win an Oceania gold medal to secure a position. Unfortunately, Fa instead won silver. He started off with a close win over New Zealand up and coming prospect and later rival, Joseph Parker. He continued his winning streak with a first-round technical knockout over Jubilee Arama in the semi-finals but lost the final against Johan Linde to settle for second place.

Fa was drafted for two seasons of the World Series of Boxing. His first season was with the Indian Mumbai Fighters Franchise as a mid season sign up for the 2011–12 season. He had a successful season and was ranked in the top 8 heavyweights for the series. His second season was during 2012–13 where he was drafted by the British Lionhearts where he fought the likes of Oleksandr Usyk and former multiple Olympic silver medalist, Clemente Russo. He was based in Sheffield, England training alongside the likes of Anthony Joshua and Joe Joyce. His first encounter with Joshua was when he trained with him back in mid-2011 when Joshua was just starting out.

=== Parker rivalry ===
Fa and Joseph Parker fought four times during their amateur careers, with two victories and two defeats each. Their first encounter was at the 2009 Boxing New Zealand National Championships held in Rotorua. The pair competed in the super-heavyweight final, Fa defeating Parker 8–4. Fa was also awarded the Bill O'Connor Cup for the youngest senior titleholder. A month later Parker forced a second-round standing eight count and a points win over Fa in a Samoan Tsunami Boxing appeal event at the North Shore Events Centre, organised by David Tua. On 12 June, they met for a third time in an amateur world-class contest rematch. It showcased as the main event at The Night of the Young Champions from ABA Stadium in 2010. Parker won by a large margin of twelve points.

In their fourth contest, Fa and Parker fought in a do-or-die opportunity to secure a place at the 2012 Summer Olympics during the Oceania Boxing Championships in Canberra, Australia. Parker had four opponents in the super-heavyweight division, one being Fa. Parker was eliminated, Fa claiming a closely fought three-round encounter eleven points to eight. He dropped the first round 2–1 but came back strongly in the second to secure a decisive 3-point lead that he protected when the final three-minute joust ended in stalemate.

== Professional career ==
=== Early beginnings ===
Fa turned pro in February 2016, where he featured at The Night of the Freaks from ASB Stadium, Auckland. After taking three years out of the sport to have a family, Fa decide to return to the sport. Assembling an impressive team, Lolo Heimuli as coach, former New Zealand Olympic sprinter Mark Keddell as manager, Shane Cameron as mentor along with input from strength and conditioning guru Angus Ross. Fa fought veteran Richard Tutaki, winning in a first-round knockout. Something Fa's amateur rival, Joseph Parker couldn't do as it took him three rounds in his third bout. In only his second professional fight, Fa was added to the Taranaki Explosion Fight Night card on 2 April. Fa showing he was far too good for Clint Foa'i whose corner threw the towel in during the first round after their fighter was hit hard in the ribs, his pain obvious. Fa fought in quick succession after another successful victory over Australian based Jayson Aloese, participating in the Royal Rampage event. Aloese whom was undefeated as both a corporate boxer and a professional, lost on points in a four-round fight by unanimous decision. Fa remained unbeaten, extending his record to four and zero. In the co-main event, New Zealand prospect Fa won his second unanimous points victory in a one-sided contest against fellow New Zealander Junior Pati. Fa landing big punches and huge shots, but could not end the fight early with Pati being remarkably durable. Fa also switched coaches, learning off Henry Schuster.

Progressing to five straight victories, Fa added another win to his professional record, knocking out his debuting countryman Tussi Asafo in the first round. The fight took place at ABA Stadium, listed as the main event at FA WARS: The Force Awakens. In the buildup to the bout, Fa injured his leg which hindered his training two weeks prior the fight. He then fought American Samoan heavyweight Alapati A'asa on Joseph Parker's undercard against Alexander Dimitrenko. Fa used his significant reach advantage effectively, keeping busy with his jab to frustrate A'asa who struggled to get on the inside. Although A'asa kept busy with his stalking style but found few inroads against Fa's defense which included some great footwork to get out of troubling situations. Sustaining an unbeaten record, Fa once again finished with another early first-round knockout. The co-main event at CTP's Judgement Day, Fa fought Junior Maletino Iakopo, however the fight ended quickly after Fa's power finished Iakopo early.

Closing in on Fa's debut year as a professional, he featured once again on one of New Zealand's most promising boxing events, The Big Bash. Hosted by Auckland Netball Centre in Auckland and broadcast on TV3. Originally scheduled to fight Daniel Tai for the vacant NZPBA heavyweight title, but due to Tai's hand injury, the title bout was called off. Instead Fa fought in a four rounder against Moe Hussain. A former kickboxer, with a record of ten wins and six losses, took the fight on short notice. Fa destroyed his opponent, the quickest fight of the night, ending in thirty seconds within the first round by technical knockout. With details of the undercard revealed for Joseph Parker's world title bout against Andy Ruiz, Fa was announced set to square off against Argentina's Pablo Matías Magrini, being Fa's toughest fight of his career. With eight fights since turning professional. Fa, was keen to showcase his skills with Top Rank's Bob Arum, one of many global promoters that watched on. But Fa was too strong, thumping Magrini with a third-round technical knockout, felling the diminutive Argentinian with a series of left-hand body blows.

Late January 2017, it was announced Fa had agreed to terms signing a three-year deal, which included clauses for a possible fourth under the tutelage of Lou DiBella. DiBella, a former boss of HBO's Boxing set up and looking after seventy fighters, including WBC heavyweight champion Deontay Wilder, where Fa would be joining him as DiBella's only other heavyweight fighter. The deal would see him fight at least three times in the United States per year, flying over fifteen days before every bout. His first challenge would be on the undercard of Wilder's title defense against Gerald Washington on 25 February at the Legacy Arena in Birmingham, Alabama. Taking on American journeyman Keith Barr over six rounds.

Fa won his fight against Keith Barr, of Glenville, West Virginia, en route to a third-round knockout. Barr was knocked down three times before the fight was stopped by the referee. He beat down his opponent with left jab-right combinations time and again. He dropped Barr, in the second round and hammered him around the ring for most of the round. In the third round, he landed at will, connecting with about two dozen unanswered punches before a left hook to the body dropped Barr to a knee. Moments later, Fa landed another body shot for another knockdown, and referee Flynn Gerald waved off the fight at 2 minutes, 36 seconds. The win improved Fa's undefeated record to ten wins.

=== Career breakout ===
In March, Fa prepared for the vacant New Zealand Professional Boxing Association heavyweight title against Daniel Tai, at the ABA Stadium in Auckland. It would be his first title shot. Tai, an Auckland-based fighter, had been fighting professionally since the year 2000, whilst he boasted a record of 22 wins and 9 losses. With only one loss coming by knockout, in 2001, by legendary Australian champion Danny Green. With the title being vacant for almost five years and last held by Sonny Bill Williams, this was Fa's most difficult fight of his career to note as he was hampered by a back injury and forced to live off the jab. Tai applied pressure and landed several clean blows throughout the bout Tai, however, Fa did enough to win most of the rounds. The judges were divided, however, with one judge scoring a draw in a disappointing majority decision win to Fa.

Fa won his twelfth pro-fight after defeating veteran Australian boxer Hunter Sam by unanimous decision. Sam, the former Australian champion, proved to be a difficult opponent and played tough throughout the fight. The bout was the main event of the Indian Motorcycle Fight Night organised by New Zealand boxing legend Shane Cameron. He then featured as one of six undefeated prospects making their SHOBOX debut, being matched with Pittsburgh's Fred Latham in an eight-round bout. The fight took place at the Masonic Temple in Cleveland, and telecasted on Showtime. Fa scored an impressive victory, knocking out Latham in the first round. His hand-speed, pressure, and punch selection were too much with referee Clifford Pinkney having no option but to stop the fight early.

He returned to the United States, fighting the former three-time amateur champion, Craig Lewis in Deadwood, South Dakota. Fa was originally scheduled to fight Joey Dawejko. But he remained undefeated after going the distance, claiming a majority decision win. Fa established the jab in the opening two rounds while looking to land a big right hand on several occasions. Lewis continuously tied up Fa but Fa landed the more power shots to earn the decision.

Originally confirmed to fight Richard Lartey from Ghana, Fa instead fought the Mexican heavyweight champion Luis Pascaul for the interim WBO Oriental title. He headlined live on Sky Sports at the Mahatma Gandhi Centre in Auckland, an event promoted by Shane Cameron and co-promoted by Lou DiBella. He won a unanimous points victory over Pascaul but gained criticism after failing to find combinations to back up some punishing one-off punches. Fa evidently won every round on the judge's scorecards with Pascual offering nothing on attack apart from lunging in for body shots. His main sparring partner Malik Scott was in the corner and persistently asked for more throughout the fight but Fa couldn't deliver.

== Personal life ==
Fa has three children. His son was diganosed with Autism at the age of two years old. Fa grew up going to The Church of Jesus Christ of Latter-day Saints. The same Mormon church as his former opponent Joseph Parker. Fa is married to his wife Talya Fa. In September 2019 Fa's father, Uaine Fa, died from cancer while Junior Fa was away in Salt Lake City, Utah in camp for his fight against American Devin Vargas. Uaine Fa last message for Junior Fa was "Just keep fighting." Fa was born in New Zealand, however, his parents were born in Tonga.

== Professional boxing record ==
| 23 fights | 20 wins | 3 losses |
|---|---|---|
| By knockout | 11 | 2 |
| By decision | 9 | 1 |

| No. | Result | Record | Opponent | Type | Round, time | Date | Location | Notes |
|---|---|---|---|---|---|---|---|---|
| 23 | Loss | 20–3 | Frank Sánchez | TKO | 7 (10), 2:42 | 23 Dec 2023 | Kingdom Arena, Riyadh, Saudi Arabia | For WBC Continental Americas and WBO-NABO heavyweight titles |
| 22 | Win | 20–2 | Tussi Asafo | KO | 1 (4), 0:45 | 23 Oct 2022 | Parāoa Brewing Co, Auckland, New Zealand | |
| 21 | Loss | 19–2 | Lucas Browne | KO | 1 (10), 1:58 | 5 Jun 2022 | Marvel Stadium, Melbourne, Australia | For WBA Oceania and vacant IBF Australasian heavyweight titles |
| 20 | Loss | 19–1 | Joseph Parker | UD | 12 | 27 Feb 2021 | Spark Arena, Auckland, New Zealand | Lost WBO Oriental heavyweight title |
| 19 | Win | 19–0 | Devin Vargas | UD | 10 | 15 Nov 2019 | Salt Palace, Salt Lake City, Utah, US | Retained WBO Oriental interim heavyweight title |
| 18 | Win | 18–0 | Dominick Guinn | UD | 10 | 28 Jun 2019 | Pechanga Resort & Casino, Temecula, California, US | |
| 17 | Win | 17–0 | Newfel Ouatah | TKO | 1 (10), 2:51 | 2 Mar 2019 | Voinovich Center, Columbus, Ohio, US | Retained WBO Oriental interim heavyweight title |
| 16 | Win | 16–0 | Rogelio Omar Rossi | TKO | 1 (10), 1:26 | 15 Dec 2018 | Horncastle Arena, Christchurch, New Zealand | Retained WBO Oriental interim heavyweight title |
| 15 | Win | 15–0 | Luis Pascual | UD | 10 | 22 Jun 2018 | Mahatma Gandhi Centre, Auckland, New Zealand | Won WBO Oriental interim heavyweight title |
| 14 | Win | 14–0 | Craig Lewis | MD | 8 | 9 Mar 2018 | Deadwood Mountain Grand, Deadwood, South Dakota, US | |
| 13 | Win | 13–0 | Fred Latham | KO | 1 (8), 1:07 | 10 Nov 2017 | Masonic Temple & Performing Arts Center, Cleveland, Ohio, US | |
| 12 | Win | 12–0 | Hunter Sam | UD | 6 | 25 May 2017 | ABA Stadium, Auckland, New Zealand | |
| 11 | Win | 11–0 | Daniel Tai | MD | 10 | 18 Mar 2017 | ABA Stadium, Auckland, New Zealand | Won vacant NZPBA heavyweight title |
| 10 | Win | 10–0 | Keith Barr | TKO | 3 (6), 2:36 | 25 Feb 2017 | Legacy Arena, Birmingham, Alabama, US | |
| 9 | Win | 9–0 | Pablo Matías Magrini | KO | 3 (8), 0:55 | 10 Dec 2016 | Vector Arena, Auckland, New Zealand | |
| 8 | Win | 8–0 | Moe Hussain | TKO | 1 (4), 0:31 | 12 Nov 2016 | AMI Netball Centre, Auckland, New Zealand | |
| 7 | Win | 7–0 | Junior Maletino Iakopo | TKO | 1 (6), 2:36 | 28 Oct 2016 | ASB Stadium, Auckland, New Zealand | |
| 6 | Win | 6–0 | Alapati A'asa | UD | 6 | 1 Oct 2016 | Vodafone Events Centre, Auckland, New Zealand | |
| 5 | Win | 5–0 | Tussi Asafo | KO | 1 (4), 2:56 | 26 Aug 2016 | ABA Stadium, Auckland, New Zealand | |
| 4 | Win | 4–0 | Junior Pati | UD | 4 | 1 Jul 2016 | ASB Stadium, Auckland, New Zealand | |
| 3 | Win | 3–0 | Jayson Aloese | UD | 4 | 16 Apr 2016 | The Trusts Arena, Auckland, New Zealand | |
| 2 | Win | 2–0 | Clint Foai | TKO | 1 (4), 2:17 | 2 Apr 2016 | TSB Stadium, New Plymouth, New Zealand | |
| 1 | Win | 1–0 | Richard Tutaki | KO | 1 (4), 0:48 | 13 Feb 2016 | ASB Stadium, Auckland, New Zealand | |

== Honors and awards ==
=== Amateur ===
- 2009 New Zealand national amateur boxing Super heavyweight champion
- 2010 Oceania Championships Super heavyweight Gold medalist
- 2010 Commonwealth Games Super heavyweight Bronze medalist
- 2012 Oceania Championships Super heavyweight Silver medalis

=== Professional ===
- 2019 Gladrap Boxing Awards Male boxer of the year (Won)
- 2019 Gladrap Boxing Awards International fight of the year (Nominated)'
- 2019 Gladrap Boxing Awards Knockout of the year (Nominated)
- 2019 Gladrap Boxing Awards Champion of the year (Nominated)

Sporting positions
Regional boxing titles
| Vacant Title last held by Sonny Bill Williams | NZPBA heavyweight champion 18 March 2017 – present | Incumbent |
| Vacant Title last held by Chauncy Welliver | WBO Oriental heavyweight champion Interim title 22 June 2018 – present | Incumbent |
