= Luke Jackson (boxer) =

Australian boxer (born 1985)

Personal information
- Nickname: Action
- Born: Luke Christopher Jackson; 1 January 1985 (age 41) Hobart, Tasmania, Australia
- Height: 5 ft 6 in (168 cm)
- Weight: Featherweight, Lightweight

Boxing career
- Reach: 68 in (173 cm)
- Stance: Orthodox

Boxing record
- Total fights: 23
- Wins: 21
- Win by KO: 8
- Losses: 2
Medal record
Men's amateur boxing
Representing Australia
Commonwealth Games
| Bronze medal – third place | 2006 Melbourne | Featherweight |

Luke Jackson (born 1 January 1985) is an Australian former professional boxer. He challenged for the interim WBO featherweight title in 2018. Jackson is a former WBA Oceania, WBO Oriental and Australian featherweight champion. As an amateur he won a bronze medal at the 2006 Commonwealth Games and represented Australia at the 2012 Summer Olympics.

== Amateur career ==
Jackson took up boxing aged 18. During his amateur career he had 145 bouts, winning 113 and losing 32. This tally included being a five-time Australian national amateur champion.

On the international stage, Jackson won a bronze medal in the featherweight division at the 2006 Commonwealth Games in Melbourne. He was selected as captain of the Australian boxing team for the 2012 Summer Olympics in London. Competing in the lightweight category, he lost in the first round to China's Liu Qiang on points 20:7.

== Professional career ==
Jackson turned professional in 2013. On 14 March 2015, in his eighth pro-fight, he defeated defending champion Will Young by split decision to win the Australian featherweight title at Rumours International in Toowoomba.

Just less than a year later, on 5 March 2016, Jackson claimed the vacant WBA Oceania title with a unanimous decision win over John Mark Apolinario at City Hall in Hobart.

On 19 November 2016, he fought Silvester Lopez for the vacant WBO Oriental featherweight title at Princes Wharf No. 1 in Hobart. Jackson won via unanimous decision.

Unbeaten in 16 professional fights, Jackson got an opportunity at a world title when he faced WBO interim featherweight champion Carl Frampton at Windsor Park in Belfast, Northern Ireland, on 18 August 2018. Fighting outside of Australia for the first time in the paid ranks, he was knocked to the canvas by a left hook to the body in the eighth round. Jackson got back to his feet and continued the bout but suffered more heavy blows in round nine, leading his corner to throw in the towel to halt the fight and give Frampton the win by technical knockout.

Jackson retired from professional boxing in August 2023.

== Airport arrest ==
On 9 November 2023, Jackson was arrested at Hobart Airport by Tasmania Police and Australian Federal Police. He was allegedly attempting to fly from Sydney to Hobart with $150,000 AUD concealed in his luggage. Jackson was charged with one count of dealing with property reasonably suspected of being proceeds of crime.

== Personal life ==
Jackson has obsessive–compulsive disorder (OCD) which went undiagnosed until he was in his late 20s.
