= Lomalito Moala =

Tongan Australian boxer (born 2000)

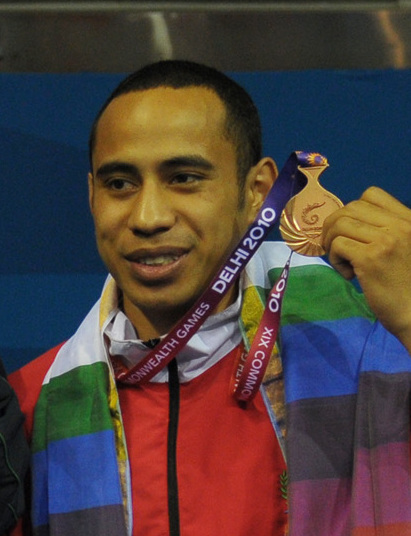

Sport
- Country: Tonga
- Sport: Boxing
Medal record
Men's Boxing
Representing Tonga
Commonwealth Games
Bronze medal – third place	2010 New Delhi	Lightweight

Lomalito Moala is a Tongan Australian boxer who has represented Tonga at the Commonwealth Games. He won a Bronze medal at the 2010 Commonwealth Games.

Moala was born in New Zealand and grew up in Lower Hutt, but moved to Australia in 2005 at the age of 15.

He competed in the 2010 Commonwealth games in New Delhi, winning bronze in the lightweight class. In 2012 he was part of the Tongan team at the Oceania Boxing Championships. He failed to qualify for the 2012 Summer Olympic Games by a single point.

He was selected for the Tongan team for the 2014 Commonwealth Games in Glasgow. In the leadup to the opening ceremony he tweeted that he would wear the shirt of football club Celtic F.C. if retweeted a hundred times. He kept his promising at the opening ceremony, attracting media attention and the ire of Tongan fans. The next day, he failed to make the weigh-in and so was not able to compete.

Moala now runs a boxing academy in Sydney.
