= Tonga at the 2006 Commonwealth Games =

Sporting event delegation

Flag of Tonga

Tonga participated at the 2006 Commonwealth Games in Melbourne with a team comprising of 24 athletes. The Tongan team included a rugby sevens team, six boxers, three weight lifters and three competitors in athletics.

== Medals ==
	(gold)	(silver)	(bronze)	Total
Tonga	0	0	0	0
