= Northern Ireland at the 2010 Commonwealth Games =

- CG code: NIR
- CGA: Northern Ireland Commonwealth Games Council
- Website: nicgc.org

in Delhi, India
- Competitors: 80
- Flag bearers: Opening: Mark Montgomery; Closing:
- Medals Ranked 13th: Gold 3 Silver 3 Bronze 4 Total 10

Commonwealth Games appearances (overview)
- 1934; 1938; 1950; 1954; 1958; 1962; 1966; 1970; 1974; 1978; 1982; 1986; 1990; 1994; 1998; 2002; 2006; 2010; 2014; 2018; 2022; 2026; 2030

Other related appearances
- Ireland (1930)

Northern Ireland competed at the 2010 Commonwealth Games in Delhi, India, from 3 to 14 October 2010. The team went by the abbreviation NIR and used the Ulster Banner as its flag and Derry Air as the victory anthem.

The team was selected in various batches throughout May and June.

Northern Ireland finished 24th in the medal table with three gold medals, four silver medals and four bronze medals.

== Medals ==
| | (gold) | (silver) | (bronze) | Total |
|---|---|---|---|---|
| Northern Ireland | 3 | 3 | 4 | 10 |

== Medallists ==
| Medal | Name | Sport | Event | Date |
|---|---|---|---|---|
| Gold | Paddy Barnes | Boxing | Light flyweight | October 13 |
| Gold | Patrick Gallagher | Boxing | Welterweight | October 13 |
| Gold | Eamonn O'Kane | Boxing | Middleweight | October 13 |
| Silver | Wendy Houvenaghel | Cycling | Women's Individual Pursuit | October 8 |
| Silver | Steven Ward | Boxing | Heavyweight | October 13 |
| Silver | Thomas McCarthy | Boxing | Light heavyweight | October 13 |
| Bronze | Sean Downey; Martyn Irvine; Philip Lavery; David McCann | Cycling | Men's Team Pursuit | October 7 |
| Bronze | Matthew Hall | Shooting | Men's 50 metre rifle prone singles | October 13 |
| Bronze | Gary Kelly | Lawn bowls | Men's Singles | October 13 |
| Bronze | David Calvert | Shooting | Full Bore Rifle Open singles | October 13 |

== Team ==
Team Northern Ireland for the 2010 Commonwealth Games was confirmed on 10 September 2010, the team members are as follows:

=== Archery ===
Team Northern Ireland consists of 7 archers.

Emma Parker, Robert Hall, Stuart Wilson, Darrel Wilson, Mark Nesbitt, Ian McGibbon, Karl Watson.

=== Athletics ===
Team Northern Ireland consists of 10 athletes.

Ciara Mageean, Kelly McNeice, Amy Foster, Tom Reynolds, Stephen Scullion, James McIlroy, Joanna Mills, Jo Patterson, Katie Kirk, Christine McMahon.

=== Badminton ===
Men

| Athlete | Events | Club |
|---|---|---|
| Matthew Gleave | doubles, mixed doubles, mixed team | Alpha Club, Lisburn |
| Tony Stephenson | singles, doubles, mixed team | Alpha Club, Lisburn |

Women

| Athlete | Events | Club |
|---|---|---|
| Caroline Black | singles, doubles, mixed team | Alpha Club, Lisburn |
| Sinead Chambers | singles, doubles, mixed doubles, mixed team | Alpha Club, Lisburn |

Team Event

| Event | Player(s) | Pool Games | Quarter Final | Semi Final | Final | Rank |
| Event | Player(s) | Opposition Result | Opposition Result | Opposition Result | Opposition Result | Rank |
|---|---|---|---|---|---|---|
| Mixed Team | TBA | Singapore | Thu 7 Oct | Thu 7 Oct | Fri 8 Oct | - |
| Mixed Team | TBA | Sri Lanka | Thu 7 Oct | Thu 7 Oct | Fri 8 Oct | - |
| Mixed Team | TBA | Jamaica | Thu 7 Oct | Thu 7 Oct | Fri 8 Oct | - |
| Mixed Team | TBA | New Zealand | Thu 7 Oct | Thu 7 Oct | Fri 8 Oct | - |

=== Boxing ===
Team Northern Ireland consists of 9 boxers.

Men

| Athlete | Event | Round of 32 | Round of 16 | Quarterfinals | Semifinals | Final | Overall Rank |
| Athlete | Event | Opposition Result | Opposition Result | Opposition Result | Opposition Result | Opposition Result | Overall Rank |
|---|---|---|---|---|---|---|---|
| Paddy Barnes | Light flyweight | Bye | (Scotland) Lain Butcher; W 4-2 | (Australia) Andrew Moloney; W 5-3 | (India) Amandeep Singh; W 5-0 | (Namibia) Jafet Uutoni; W 8-4 | Gold medal |
| Michael Conlon | Flyweight | Bye | (Australia) Jason Moloney; L +10-10 | Did not advance | | | |
| Tyrone McCullagh | Bantamweight | Bye | (Australia) Ibrahim Balla; W 7-2 | (Wales) Sean McGoldrick; L 4-3 | Did not advance | | |
| Mark O'Hara | Lightweight | (Namibia) Mikka Shonena; W 6-3 | (New Zealand) Angus Donaldson; W 6-0 | (Canada) Alex Rynn; L 9-5 | Did not advance | | |
| Steven Donnelly | Light welterweight | (Australia) Luke Woods; L 10-0 | Did not advance | | | | |
| Patrick Gallagher | Welterweight | (Cameroon) Joseph Mulema; W 3-0 | (Bangladesh) Suruz Bangali; W 9-0 | (Namibia) Mujandjae Kasuto; W 7-5 | (India) Dilbag Singh; W 5-4 | (England) Callum Smith; W 11-6 | Gold medal |
| Eamonn O'Kane | Middleweight | (Sri Lanka) Ranil Jayathilakage; W 5-0 | (New Zealand) Nathon McKwen; W 9-2 | (Samoa) Afaese Fata; W 7-2 | (Wales) Keiran Harding; W 12-6 | (England) Anthony Ogogo; W 16-4 | Gold medal |
| Tommy McCarthy | Light heavyweight | Bye | (Tanzania) Leonard Machichi; W 11-1 | (New Zealand) Reece Papuni; W 7-2 | (Kenya) Joshua Makonjio; W 9-4 | (Scotland) Callum Johnson; L 8-1 | Silver medal |
| Steven Ward | Heavyweight | Bye | (Australia) Giancarlo Squillace; W 7-4 | (India) Manpreet Singh; W 11-10 | (Scotland) Stephen Simmons; W 6-1 | (England) Simon Vallily; L RSCH | Silver medal |

=== Cycling ===
Team Northern Ireland consists of:

Wendy Houvenaghel, David McCann, Michael Hutchinson, Philip Lavery, Heather Carson, Martyn Irvine, Adam Armstrong, Sean Downey.

Northern Ireland won the bronze medal in the 4000 m men's team pursuit race.

=== Gymnastics ===
Team Northern Ireland consists of 3 gymnasts.

Luke Carson, Charlotte McKenna, Seriena Johnrose.

=== Lawn bowls ===
Men

| Athlete | Events | Club |
|---|---|---|
| Neil Booth | triples | Old Bleach BC |
| Paul Daly | triples | Ulster Transport BC |
| Gary Kelly | singles | Ballymoney BC |
| Gary McCloy | pairs | Portrush BC |
| Ian McClure | pairs | Portrush BC |
| Martin McHugh | triples | Whitehead BC |

Women

| Athlete | Events | Club |
|---|---|---|
| Sandra Bailie | triples | Knock BC |
| Mandy Cunningham | triples | Ewarts BC |
| Jennifer Dowds | pairs | Ballymena BC |
| Barbara Logue | triples | Ballymoney BC |
| Donna McCloy | pairs | Ballymena BC |

=== Shooting ===
Men

| Athlete | Events |
|---|---|
| David Beattie | clay pigeon trap, trap pair |
| David Calvert | fullbore rifle, fullbore rifle pairs |
| Robert Doak | 10m air pistol, air pistol pair, 25m standard pistol, 25m standard pistol pair, 50m free pistol, centre fire pistol, centre fire pistol pair |
| Gary Duff | 50m rifle prone, 50m rifle prone pair |
| Matthew Hall | 50m rifle prone, 50m rifle prone pair |
| Ross McGuillan | fullbore rifle, fullbore rifle pairs |
| Mervyn Morrison | clay pigeon trap, trap pair |
| Hugh Duncan Stewart | 10m air pistol, air pistol pair, 25m standard pistol, 25m standard pistol pair, centre fire pistol, centre fire pistol pair |

Women

| Athlete | Events |
|---|---|
| Louise Aiken | 50m rifle prone |
| Debbie Bader | clay pigeon trap, trap pair |
| Kirsty Barr | clay pigeon trap, trap pair |

=== Squash ===
Team Northern Ireland consists of 2 squash players. Women

| Athlete | Events | Club | Medals |
|---|---|---|---|
| Zoe Barr | singles, doubles | Bangor | |
| Madeline Perry | singles, doubles | Banbridge | |

=== Table Tennis ===
Team Northern Ireland consists of 5 table tennis players.

Na Liu, Amanda Mogey, Ashley Given, Paul McCreery, Claire Nelson.

=== Swimming ===
Team Northern Ireland consists of 11 swimmers.

Melanie Nocher, Andrew Bree, Ryan Harrison, Conor Leaney, Bethany Carson, Michael Dawson, Chelsey Wilson, Clare Dawson, Sycerika McMahon, Laurence McGivern, Robert McFaul.

== Wrestling ==
Team Northern Ireland consists of 1 wrestler.

Men – Freestyle

| Event | Wrestler | Rank |
|---|---|---|
| Freestyle 96 kg | Mark Montgomery | - |
