= Boxing at the 2010 Commonwealth Games =

Boxing competitions

- Venue: Talkatora Stadium
- Location: Delhi, India
- Dates: 5 to 11 October 2010
- Nations: 38

Boxing at the 2010 Commonwealth Games was the 19th appearance of the Boxing at the Commonwealth Games. The events were held in Delhi, India, from 5 to 11 October 2010 and featured contests in eleven weight classes.

The boxing events were held at the Talkatora Stadium and the training venue for the event was at Delhi University.

== Medal summary ==
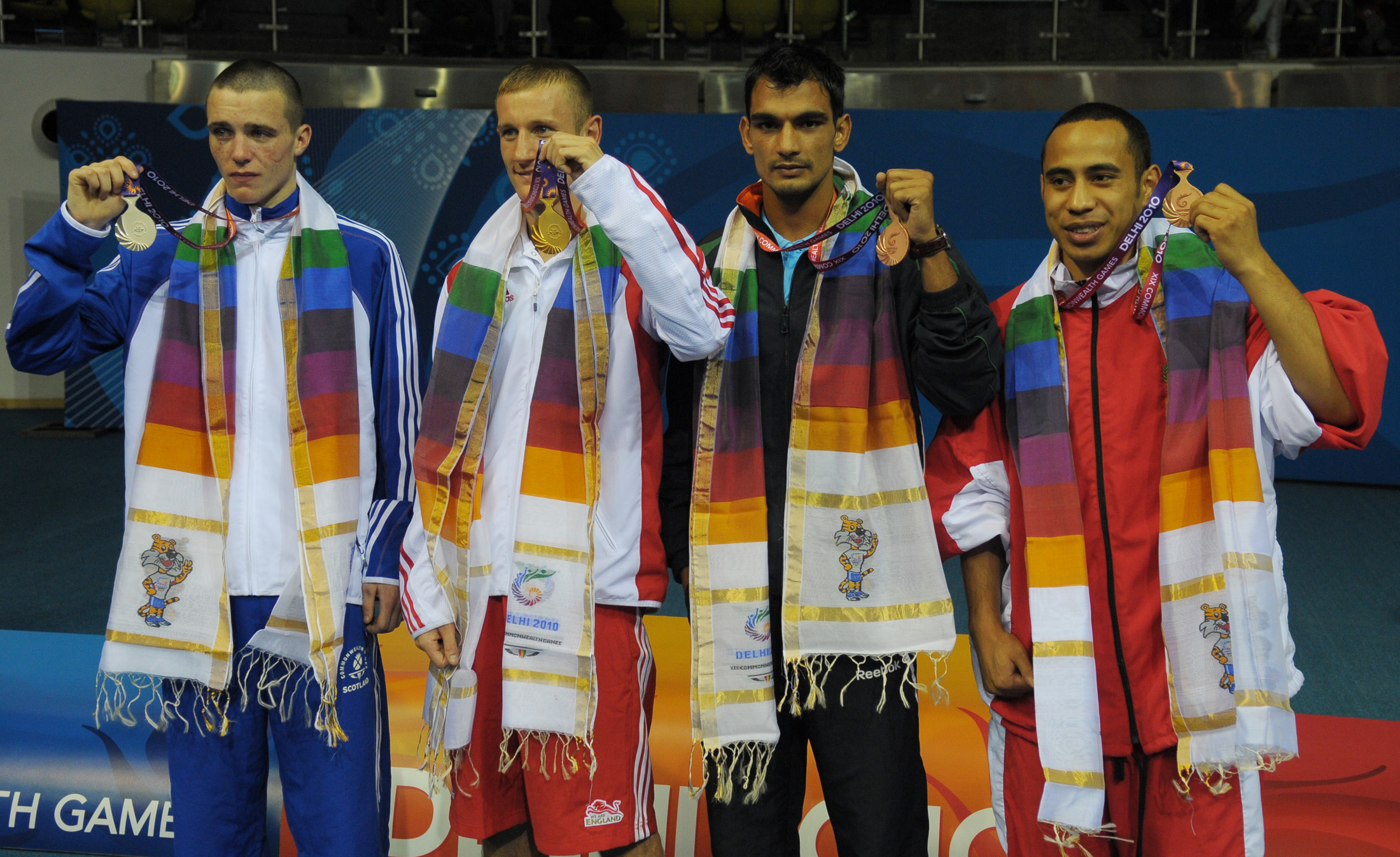
XIX Commonwealth Games-2010 Delhi Winners of (60 kg category Boxing), Thomas Stalker of England (Gold), Josh Taylor of Scotland (Silver) and Jai Bhagwan of India (Bronze) Lornalito Moala of Tonga (Bronze)

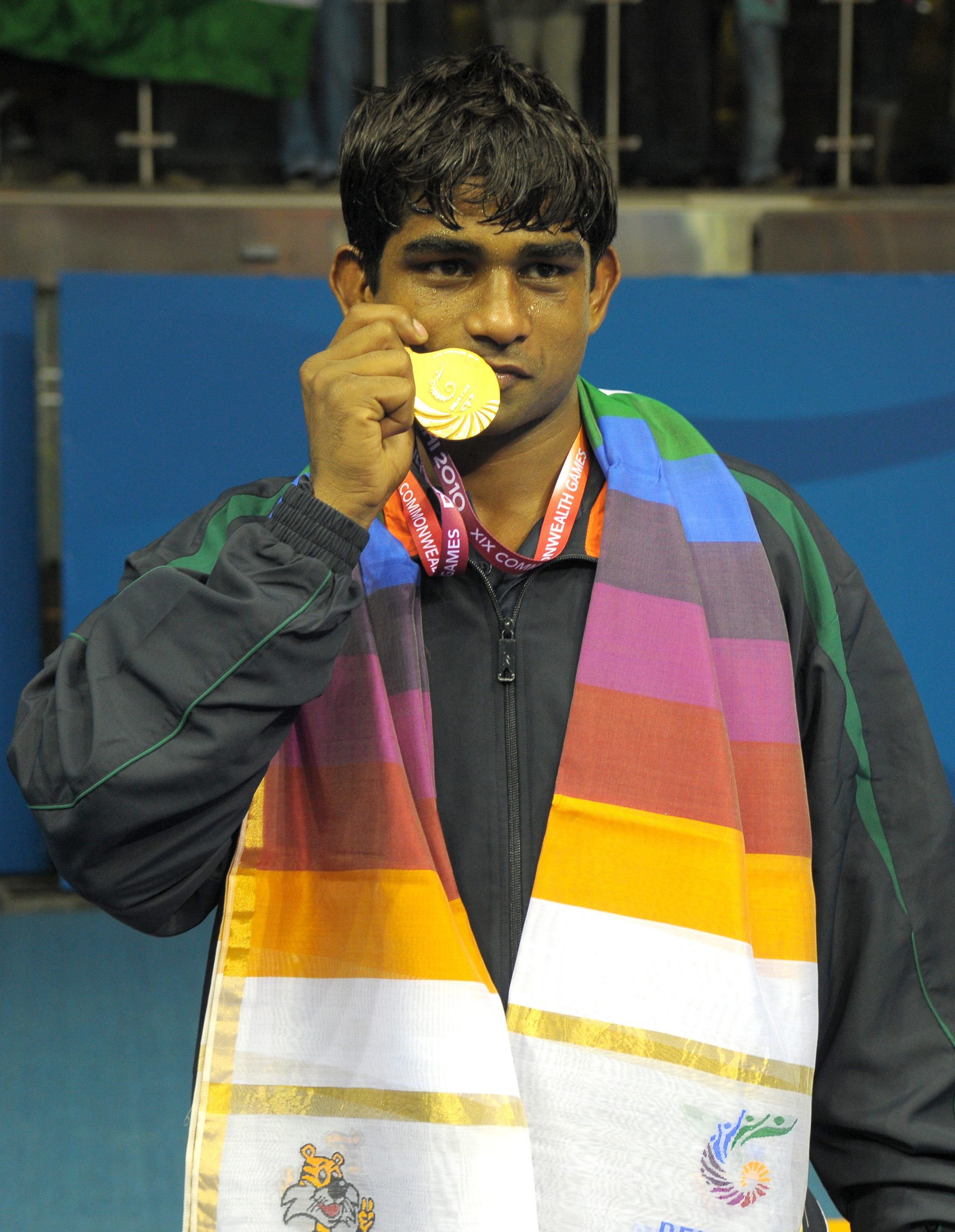
XIX Commonwealth Games-2010 Delhi (Men’s) Boxing Heavy Weight 91Kg Event Paramjeet Samota of India won the Gold Medal, at Talkatora Indoor Stadium, in New Delhi on October on October 13, 2010

Event	Gold	Silver	Bronze
Light flyweight (48 kg)	Paddy Barnes; Northern Ireland	Jafet Uutoni; Namibia	Muhammad Waseem; Pakistan
Light flyweight (48 kg)	Paddy Barnes; Northern Ireland	Jafet Uutoni; Namibia	Amandeep Singh; India
Flyweight (51 kg)	Suranjoy Mayengbam; India	Benson Gicharu Njangiru; Kenya	Oteng Oteng; Botswana
Flyweight (51 kg)	Suranjoy Mayengbam; India	Benson Gicharu Njangiru; Kenya	Haroon Iqbal; Pakistan
Bantamweight (54 kg)	Sean McGoldrick; Wales	Tirafalo Seoko; Botswana	Nicholas Okoth; Kenya
Bantamweight (54 kg)	Sean McGoldrick; Wales	Tirafalo Seoko; Botswana	Louis Julie; Mauritius
Lightweight (60 kg)	Thomas Stalker; England	Josh Taylor; Scotland	Jai Bhagwan; India
Lightweight (60 kg)	Thomas Stalker; England	Josh Taylor; Scotland	Lomalito Moala; Tonga
Light welterweight (64 kg)	Manoj Kumar; India	Bradley Saunders; England	Valentino Knowles; Bahamas
Light welterweight (64 kg)	Manoj Kumar; India	Bradley Saunders; England	Louis Colin; Mauritius
Welterweight (69 kg)	Patrick Gallagher; Northern Ireland	Callum Smith; England	Carl Hield; Bahamas
Welterweight (69 kg)	Patrick Gallagher; Northern Ireland	Callum Smith; England	Dilbag Singh; India
Middleweight (75 kg)	Eamonn O'Kane; Northern Ireland	Anthony Ogogo; England	Vijender Singh; India
Middleweight (75 kg)	Eamonn O'Kane; Northern Ireland	Anthony Ogogo; England	Keiron Harding; Wales
Light heavyweight (81 kg)	Callum Johnson; Scotland	Tommy McCarthy; Northern Ireland	Joshua Makonjio; Kenya
Light heavyweight (81 kg)	Callum Johnson; Scotland	Tommy McCarthy; Northern Ireland	Jermaine Asare; Wales
Heavyweight (91 kg)	Simon Vallily; England	Steven Ward; Northern Ireland	Awusone Yekeni; Ghana
Heavyweight (91 kg)	Simon Vallily; England	Steven Ward; Northern Ireland	Stevie Simmons; Scotland
Super heavyweight (+91 kg)	Paramjeet Samota; India	Tariq Abdul Haqq; Trinidad and Tobago	Blaise Yepmou; Cameroon
Super heavyweight (+91 kg)	Paramjeet Samota; India	Tariq Abdul Haqq; Trinidad and Tobago	Junior Fa; Tonga

== Medal table ==
* Host nation (India)

Rank	Nation	Gold	Silver	Bronze	Total
1	Northern Ireland	3	2	0	5
2	India*	3	0	4	7
3	England	2	3	0	5
4	Scotland	1	1	1	3
5	Wales	1	0	2	3
6	Kenya	0	1	2	3
7	Botswana	0	1	1	2
8	Namibia	0	1	0	1
8	Trinidad and Tobago	0	1	0	1
10	Bahamas	0	0	2	2
10	Mauritius	0	0	2	2
10	Pakistan	0	0	2	2
10	Tonga	0	0	2	2
14	Cameroon	0	0	1	1
14	Ghana	0	0	1	1
Totals (15 entries)		10	10	20	40

== Participating nations ==
- Antigua and Barbuda (1)
- Australia (10)
- Bahamas (2)
- Bangladesh (3)
- Barbados (2)
- Botswana (6)
- Cameroon (3)
- Canada (5)
- Cook Islands (2)
- Cyprus (1)
- England (9)
- The Gambia (1)
- Ghana (9)
- Grenada (3)
- Guyana (3)
- India (10)
- Isle of Man (2)
- Jamaica (4)
- Kenya (10)
- Kiribati (4)
- Lesotho (6)
- Malaysia (7)
- Malawi (4)
- Mauritius (8)
- Namibia (7)
- Nigeria (5)
- Northern Ireland (9)
- Niue (1)
- Nauru (4)
- New Zealand (6)
- Pakistan (6)
- Papua New Guinea (5)
- Rwanda (1)
- Saint Lucia (3)
- Saint Vincent and the Grenadines (3)
- Samoa (3)
- Scotland (7)
- Seychelles (2)
- Sierra Leone (2)
- Solomon Islands (2)
- South Africa (4)
- Sri Lanka (7)
- Swaziland (2)
- Tanzania (8)
- Tonga (6)
- Trinidad and Tobago (3)
- Wales (9)
- Zambia (4)
