= Boxing at the 2010 Commonwealth Games – Heavyweight =

Boxing competitions

The Heavyweight class is an event on the Boxing at the 2010 Commonwealth Games competition. Heavyweights were limited to those boxers weighing less than 91 kilograms (200.62 lbs). 17 boxers competed.

Like all Olympic boxing events, the competition was a straight single-elimination tournament. Both semifinal losers were awarded bronze medals, so no boxers competed again after their first loss. Bouts consisted of four rounds of two minutes each, with one-minute breaks between rounds. Punches scored only if the white area on the front of the glove made full contact with the front of the head or torso of the opponent. Five judges scored each bout; three of the judges had to signal a scoring punch within one second for the punch to score. The winner of the bout was the boxer who scored the most valid punches by the end of the bout.

== Medalists ==
Gold	Simon Vallily; England
Silver	Steven Ward; Northern Ireland
Bronze	Awusone Yekeni; Ghana
Bronze	Stephen Simmons; Scotland

== Tournament ==
=== Bracket ===
Round of 32
Kevin Evans (WAL)	2
Samir El-Mais (CAN)	11

Round of 16
Elly Ochola (KEN)	RSCI
David Aloua (NZL)
Awusone Yekeni (GHA)
Semisi Kalu (TON)	RET
Arsene Fokou (CMR)	+2
Anderson Emmanuel (BAR)	2
Dominic Winrow (IOM)
Simon Vallily (ENG)	KO
Manpreet Singh (IND)	15
Haruna Mhando (TAN)	3
Giancarlo Squillace (AUS)	4
Steven Ward (NIR)	7
Stephen Simmons (SCO)	10
Masana Manganyi (RSA)	2
Duncan Lorenz (SVG)	0
Samir El-Mais (CAN)	11

Quarterfinals
Elly Ochola (KEN)	3
Awusone Yekeni (GHA)	7
Arsene Fokou (CMR)
Simon Vallily (ENG)	RSCH R3 2:39
Manpreet Singh (IND)	10
Steven Ward (NIR)	11
Stephen Simmons (SCO)	7
Samir El-Mais (CAN)	4

Semifinals
Awusone Yekeni (GHA)
Simon Vallily (ENG)	w/o
Steven Ward (NIR)	6
Stephen Simmons (SCO)	1

Finals
Simon Vallily (ENG)	RSCH R1 1:58
Steven Ward (NIR)
