= Boxing at the 2010 Commonwealth Games – Light heavyweight =

Boxing competitions

The light heavyweight class is an event on the Boxing at the 2010 Commonwealth Games competition. Light heavyweights were limited to those boxers weighing under 81 kilograms (179 lb), 20 boxers competed.

Like all Olympic boxing events, the competition was a straight single-elimination tournament. Both semifinal losers were awarded bronze medals, so no boxers competed again after their first loss. Bouts consisted of three rounds of three minutes each, with one-minute breaks between rounds. Punches scored only if the front of the glove made full contact with the front of the head or torso of the opponent. Five judges scored each bout; three of the judges had to signal a scoring punch within one second for the punch to score. The winner of the bout was the boxer who scored the most valid punches by the end of the bout.

== Medalists ==
Gold	Callum Johnson; Scotland
Silver	Tommy McCarthy; Northern Ireland
Bronze	Joshua Makonjio; Kenya
Bronze	Jermaine Asare; Wales

== Tournament ==
Round of 32
Ahmed Saraku (GHA)	18
Yakita Aska (ANT)	4
Jermaine Asare (WAL)	6
Tarieta Ruata (KIR)	3
Andrew Fermin (TRI)	DSQ
Filimaua Hala (SAM)
Lennon Bannis (DMA)	6
Mathew Titoa (COK)	1

Round of 16
Reece Papuni (NZL)	5
Travis Tapatuetoa (NIU)	1
Tommy McCarthy (NIR)	11
Leonard Machichi (TAN)	1
Rodney Prosper (MRI)	6
Joshua Makonjio (KEN)	11
Mussa Ajibu (MAW)	3
Dane Mulivai (AUS)	4
Dinesh Kumar (IND)	8
Obed Mbwakongo (ENG)	9
Krystian Borucki (IOM)	1
Callum Johnson (SCO)	8
Ahmed Saraku (GHA)	3
Jermaine Asare (WAL)	+3
Filimaua Hala (SAM)	+0
Lennon Bannis (DMA)	0

Quarterfinals
Reece Papuni (NZL)	2
Tommy McCarthy (NIR)	7
Joshua Makonjio (KEN)	9
Dane Mulivai (AUS)	4
Obed Mbwakongo (ENG)	2
Callum Johnson (SCO)	6
Jermaine Asare (WAL)	10
Filimaua Hala (SAM)	4

Semifinals
Tommy McCarthy (NIR)	9
Joshua Makonjio (KEN)	4
Callum Johnson (SCO)	RSC
Jermaine Asare (WAL)

Final
Tommy McCarthy (NIR)	1
Callum Johnson (SCO)	8
