= Boxing at the 2010 Commonwealth Games – Welterweight =

Boxing competitions

The Welterweight class is an even on the Boxing at the 2010 Commonwealth Games competition. Welterweights were limited to those boxers weighing less than 69 kilograms (152.12 lbs).

32 boxers competed, this is the second largest amount of entries in any weight class.

Like all Olympic boxing events, the competition was a straight single-elimination tournament. Both semifinal losers were awarded bronze medals, so no boxers competed again after their first loss. Bouts consisted of four rounds of two minutes each, with one-minute breaks between rounds. Punches scored only if the white area on the front of the glove made full contact with the front of the head or torso of the opponent. Five judges scored each bout; three of the judges had to signal a scoring punch within one second for the punch to score. The winner of the bout was the boxer who scored the most valid punches by the end of the bout.

== Medalists ==
Gold	Patrick Gallagher; Northern Ireland
Silver	Callum Smith; England
Bronze	Carl Hield; Bahamas
Bronze	Dilbag Singh; India

== Tournament ==
=== Bracket ===
Round of 32
Steve Thanki (MAW)
Keithland King (SVG)	KO R2 3:00
Joseph St.Pierre (MRI)	+8
Freddie Evans (WAL)	8
Kokole Paneng (LES)	1
Muhamad Farkhan (MAS)	8
Hubert Lucien (DMA)
Carl Hield (BAH)	RSC
Rayton Okwiri (KEN)	3
Aston Brown (SCO)	8
Joseph Mwaisalenge (TAN)	3
Custio Clayton (CAN)	5
Ritiati Betero (KIR)	0
Callum Smith (ENG)	5
Cameron Hammond (AUS)	7
Kehinde Ademuyiwa (NGR)	2
Joseph Deireragea (NRU)	3
Michalis Michaelidis (CYP)	+3
Mujandjae Kasuto (NAM)	KO R3 0:46
Siphiwe Lusizi (RSA)
Suranga Mudannayaka (SRI)	1
Suruz Bangali (BAN)	9
Patrick Gallagher (NIR)	3
Joseph Mulema (CMR)	0
Moabi Mothiba (BOT)	11
Azumah Mohammed (GHA)	2
Reece Shagourie (JAM)	1
Godfrey Mumba (ZAM)	3
Viliami Latu (TON)	4
Dilbag Singh (IND)	22
Miguel Auguste (LCA)
Aaron Prince (TRI)	RSC

Round of 16
Keithland King (SVG)	8
Joseph St.Pierre (MRI)	10
Muhamad Farkhan (MAS)	3
Carl Hield (BAH)	7
Aston Brown (SCO)	4
Custio Clayton (CAN)	1
Callum Smith (ENG)	4
Cameron Hammond (AUS)	2
Michalis Michaelidis (CYP)	3
Mujandjae Kasuto (NAM)	5
Suruz Bangali (BAN)	0
Patrick Gallagher (NIR)	9
Moabi Mothiba (BOT)	7
Godfrey Mumba (ZAM)	1
Dilbag Singh (IND)	13
Aaron Prince (TRI)	3

Quarterfinals
Joseph St.Pierre (MRI)	1
Carl Hield (BAH)	13
Aston Brown (SCO)	0
Callum Smith (ENG)	4
Mujandjae Kasuto (NAM)	5
Patrick Gallagher (NIR)	7
Moabi Mothiba (BOT)	3
Dilbag Singh (IND)	11

Semifinals
Carl Hield (BAH)	3
Callum Smith (ENG)	4
Patrick Gallagher (NIR)	5
Dilbag Singh (IND)	4

Finals
Callum Smith (ENG)	6
Patrick Gallagher (NIR)	11
