= Mark Montgomery =

Mark Montgomery may refer to:

- Mark Montgomery (entrepreneur) (born 1967), American entrepreneur
- Mark Montgomery (basketball) (born 1970), American college basketball coach
- Mark Montgomery (baseball) (born 1990), minor league baseball pitcher
- Mark Montgomery (softball) (born 1966), American college softball coach
- Mark Montgomery (wrestler) (born 1974), Northern Irish sportsman
- Mark Montgomery (racing driver) in 2005 NASCAR Busch Series

== See also ==
- Marc Montgomery (disambiguation)
