= Boxing at the 2010 Commonwealth Games – Super heavyweight =

Boxing competitions

The Super Heavyweight class is an even on the Boxing at the 2010 Commonwealth Games competition. Super Heavyweights were limited to those boxers weighing over 91 kilograms (201 lb) and thus is the heaviest weight class in boxing. 16 boxers competed.

Like all Olympic boxing events, the competition was a straight single-elimination tournament. Both semifinal losers were awarded bronze medals, so no boxers competed again after their first loss. Bouts consisted of four rounds of two minutes each, with one-minute breaks between rounds. Punches scored only if the white area on the front of the glove made full contact with the front of the head or torso of the opponent. Five judges scored each bout; three of the judges had to signal a scoring punch within one second for the punch to score. The winner of the bout was the boxer who scored the most valid punches by the end of the bout.

== Medalists ==
Gold	Paramjeet Samota; India
Silver	Tariq Abdul Haqq; Trinidad and Tobago
Bronze	Blaise Yepmou; Cameroon
Bronze	Junior Fa; Tonga

== Tournament ==
Round of 16
Meer Khan (PAK)	1
Tariq Abdul Haqq (TRI)	10
Didier Bence (CAN)	7
Joseph Parker (NZL)	14
Andrew Jones (WAL)
Blaise Yepmou (CMR)
Michael Nakafwa (KEN)	0
Tobias Munihango (NAM)	4
Jubilee Arama (COK)	8
Jake Ageidu (NRU)	12
Amin Isa (ENG)	5
Uaine Fa Jr (TON)	8
Andre Reid (JAM)
Paramjeet Samota (IND)	RSC
Alexey Mukhin (AUS)	7
Ross Henderson (SCO)	1

Quarterfinals
Tariq Abdul Haqq (TRI)	+7
Joseph Parker (NZL)	7
Blaise Yepmou (CMR)	3
Tobias Munihango (NAM)	2
Jake Ageidu (NRU)	2
Uaine Fa Jr (TON)	12
Paramjeet Samota (IND)	7
Alexey Mukhin (AUS)	4

Semifinals
Tariq Abdul Haqq (TRI)	7
Blaise Yepmou (CMR)	5
Uaine Fa Jr (TON)	2
Paramjeet Samota (IND)	6

Final
Tariq Abdul Haqq (TRI)	1
Paramjeet Samota (IND)	5
