= Shane Crawford (disambiguation) =

Shane Crawford is an Australian footballer. It may also refer to:

- Shane Crawford (Jamaican footballer)
- Shane Crawford (militant)
