= Freddy Kiwitt =

Liberian-German boxer

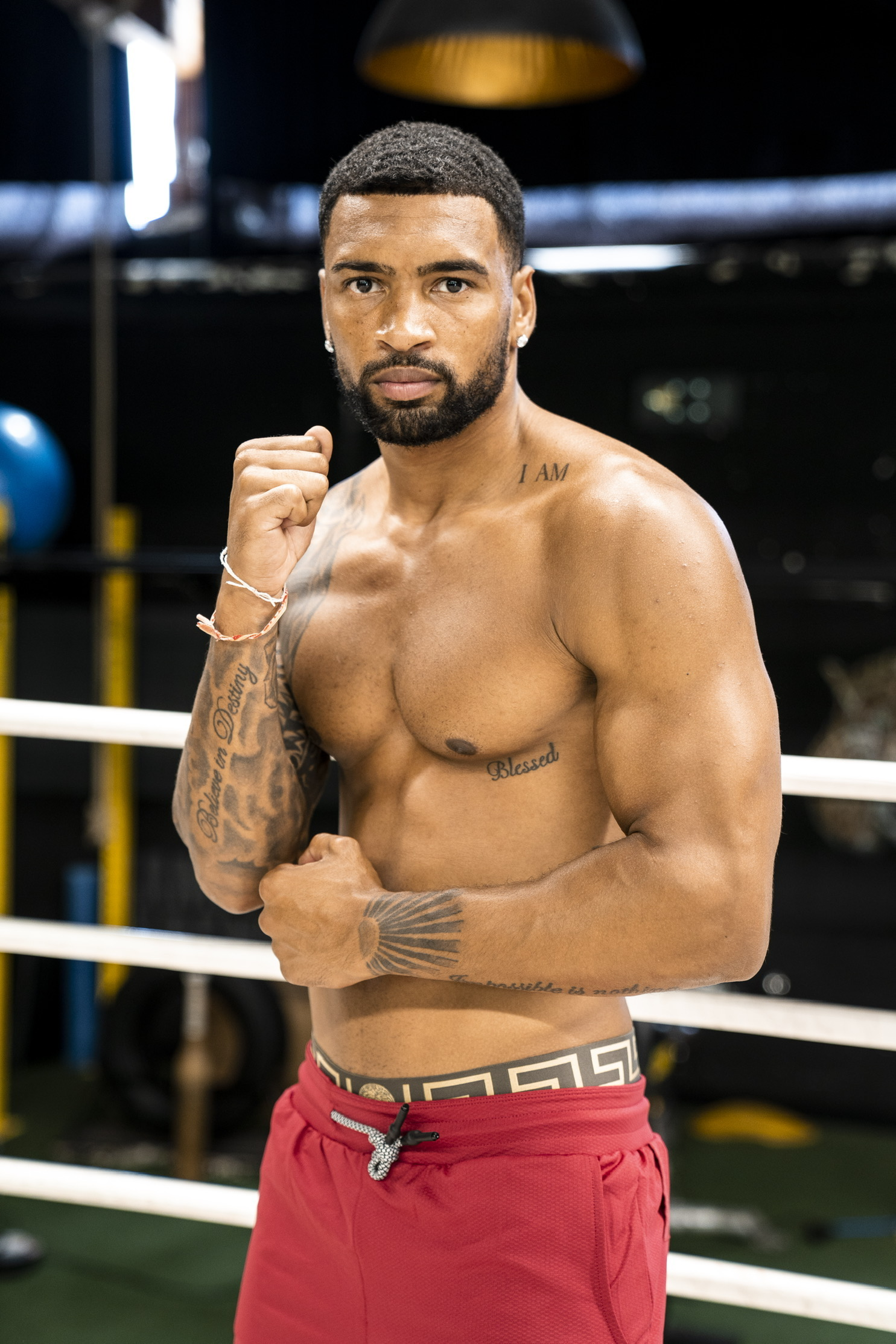

Personal information
- Nickname: KING
- Nationality: German, Liberian
- Born: August 24, 1990 (age 36) Saclepea, Liberia
- Height: 1.80 m (5 ft 11 in)
- Weight: Super Welterweight

Boxing career
- Stance: Orthodox

Boxing record
- Total fights: 33
- Wins: 30
- Win by KO: 19
- Losses: 3

Frederick Kiwitt is a Liberian-German professional boxer who is the current WBF and WBO Global super welterweight champion, holding the title since November 2023. He has competed professionally in multiple countries, including the United Kingdom, Germany, Denmark, and Ghana. He also held the WBO European welterweight title in 2019.

== Early years and family ==
Kiwitt was born in Saclepea, Liberia, in 1990 to a German father and Liberian mother during the Liberian Civil War. A few months after Kiwitt's birth, in order to escape the war, the family moved to the German city of Flensburg, where Kiwitt spent his childhood and youth.

== Career ==
Kiwitt joined the boxing division of local sports club DGF Flensborg in his hometown of Flensburg, Germany, at age 18. He trained there until moving to England to launch his professional career. He made his professional debut on 23 November 2013, beating his opponent on points. In 2018 he hired former professional boxer Manuel Ossie as his trainer.

=== Southern Area Champion ===
On 9 July 2017, Kiwitt had his first regional title fight. In London York Hall, he knocked out former English Champion Erick Ochieng in the seventh round to win the Southern Area Welterweight Title.

=== European Champion ===
On 22 February 2019, Kiwitt beat British boxer Paddy Gallagher at York Hall in London to win the WBO European Championship. He scored two knockdowns during the fight and was declared the winner on points after 10 rounds. Subsequently, the WBO ranked him at 11 in the welterweight division.

=== African Champion ===
Kiwitt became the African welterweight champion on 20 July 2019 in Accra, Ghana, scoring a technical knockout against Samuel Turkson in the fourth round.

=== German Champion ===
On 3 December 2022, Kiwitt fought for the first time in his hometown of Flensburg, defeating Ali Hasso for the German Superwelterweight Championship via a third-round knockout.

=== World Boxing Federation champion ===
On 23 November 2023, Kiwitt defeated Venezuelan boxer Luis Enrique Romero by technical knockout to win the vacant WBF super welterweight title in Flensburg, Germany.

The bout was sanctioned by the WBF as a world title fight, with Kiwitt securing victory after Romero’s corner stopped the fight before the eleventh round.

He subsequently defended the title in 2025, including a victory over Evander Castillo in Flensburg.

== Professional boxing record ==
| 31 fights | 28 wins | 3 losses |
|---|---|---|
| By knockout | 18 | 0 |
| By decision | 10 | 3 |

| No. | Result | Record | Opponent | Type | Round, time | Date | Location | Notes |
|---|---|---|---|---|---|---|---|---|
| 31 | Win | 28–3 | (Venezuela) Ifrain Alcantara | TKO | 6 (8), 2:15 | 13 Sep 2025 | Sydbank Arena, Kolding, Denmark | |
| 30 | Win | 27–3 | (Venezuela) Evander Castillo | TKO | 9 (12), 2:30 | 29 Mar 2025 | Deutsches Haus, Flensburg, Germany | Retained WBF super welterweight title |
| 29 | Win | 26–3 | (Venezuela) Gregorio Dominguez | KO | 2 (8), 1:36 | 1 May 2024 | Grosse Freiheit 36, St. Pauli, Germany | |
| 28 | Win | 25–3 | (Venezuela) Luis Enrique Romero | TKO | 11 (12), 2:03 | 23 Nov 2023 | Deutsches Haus, Flensburg, Germany | Won vacant WBF super welterweight title |
| 27 | Win | 24–3 | (Germany) Dustin Ammann | TKO | 3 (8), 1:30 | 24 June 2023 | Foerdegymnasium, Flensburg, Germany | |
| 26 | Win | 23–3 | (Syria) Ali Hasso | KO | 3 (10) | 2 Dec 2022 | Foerdehalle, Flensburg, Germany | Won BDB German super welterweight title |
| 25 | Win | 22–3 | (Venezuela) Ivan Matute | UD | 8 | 10 Sep 2022 | Universum Gym, Hamburg, Germany | |
| 24 | Win | 21–3 | (Georgia (country)) Merab Turkadze | KO | 3 (8), 2:22 | 19 Feb 2022 | Universum Gym, Hamburg, Germany | |
| 23 | Win | 20–3 | (Colombia) Wilber Blanco | KO | 3 (8), 2:10 | 20 Nov 2021 | Universum Gym, Hamburg, Germany | |
| 22 | Win | 19–3 | (Venezuela) Johan Perez | UD | 8 | 25 Sep 2021 | Universum Gym, Hamburg, Germany | |
| 21 | Win | 18–3 | (Romania) Octavian Gratii | UD | 6 | 21 Aug 2021 | Universum Gym, Hamburg, Germany | |
| 20 | Loss | 17–3 | (United Kingdom) Luther Clay | UD | 10 | 19 Dec 2019 | (United Kingdom) York Hall, London, England | For WBO Global welterweight title |
| 19 | Win | 17–2 | (Georgia (country)) Nika Nakashidze | RTD | 6 (8), 3:00 | 9 Nov 2019 | Vinding Idraetscenter, Vejle, Denmark | |
| 18 | Win | 16–2 | (Ghana) Samuel Turkson | RTD | 4 (12), 3:00 | 20 Jul 2019 | Old Kingsway Building, Accra, Ghana | Won vacant African welterweight title |
| 17 | Win | 15–2 | (United Kingdom) Paddy Gallagher | MD | 10 | 22 Feb 2019 | (United Kingdom) York Hall, London, England | Won vacant WBO European welterweight title |
| 16 | Win | 14–2 | (Ghana) Frank Dodzi | TKO | 3 (8) | 24 Dec 2018 | Bukom Boxing Arena, Accra, Ghana | |
| 15 | Win | 13–2 | (United Kingdom) Jumanne Camero | PTS | 8 | 16 Feb 2018 | (United Kingdom) York Hall, London, England | |
| 14 | Loss | 12–2 | (United Kingdom) Louis Greene | PTS | 10 | 23 Sep 2017 | (United Kingdom) York Hall, London, England | Lost Southern Area welterweight title |
| 13 | Win | 12–1 | (United Kingdom) Erick Ochieng | KO | 7 (10), 2:29 | 9 Jul 2017 | (United Kingdom) York Hall, London, England | Won vacant Southern Area welterweight title |
| 12 | Loss | 11–1 | (United Kingdom) Akeem Ennis-Brown | PTS | 10 | 12 Nov 2016 | (United Kingdom) York Hall, London, England | |
| 11 | Win | 11–0 | (Latvia) Zaurs Sadihovs | TKO | 4 (6), 0:29 | 24 Sept 2016 | (United Kingdom) York Hall, London, England | |
| 10 | Win | 10–0 | (Czech Republic) Jiri Jaros | KO | 2 (6), 1:29 | 16 Jul 2016 | Max-Schmeling-Halle, Berlin, Germany | |
| 9 | Win | 9–0 | (Nicaragua) Michael Mora | TKO | 5 (6), 2:54 | 12 Mar 2016 | Jahnsportforum, Neubrandenburg, Germany | |
| 8 | Win | 8–0 | (Belgium) Andrei Dolgozhiev | KO | 1 (6), 2:59 | 5 Dec 2015 | Inselparkhalle, Hamburg, Germany | |
| 7 | Win | 7–0 | (United Kingdom) Ryan Toms | PTS | 6 | 29 May 2015 | (United Kingdom) York Hall, London, England | |
| 6 | Win | 6–0 | (Slovakia) Lubos Priehradnik | TKO | 1 (6) | 18 Apr 2015 | (United Kingdom) Camden Centre, London, England | |
| 5 | Win | 5–0 | (United Kingdom) Kevin McCauley | PTS | 4 | 26 Oct 2014 | (United Kingdom) Plymouth Guildhall, Plymouth, England | |
| 4 | Win | 4–0 | (United Kingdom) Kevin McCauley | PTS | 4 | 21 Jun 2014 | (United Kingdom) Riviera International Conference Centre, Torquay, England | |
| 3 | Win | 3–0 | (United Kingdom) Dee Mitchell | PTS | 4 | 26 Apr 2014 | (United Kingdom) GL1 Leisure Centre, Gloucester, England | |
| 2 | Win | 2–0 | (United Kingdom) Owen Raine | TKO | 1 (4), 2:03 | 14 Mar 2014 | (United Kingdom) Oasis Leisure Centre, Swindon, England | |
| 1 | Win | 1–0 | (United Kingdom) Matt Seawright | PTS | 4 | 23 Nov 2013 | (United Kingdom) GL1 Leisure Centre, Gloucester, England | |
