= Simon Vallily =

English boxer (born 1985)

Personal information
- Nationality: British
- Born: 15 August 1985 (age 40) Middlesbrough, Yorkshire, England
- Weight: Heavyweight; Cruiserweight

Boxing career
- Stance: Orthodox

Boxing record
- Total fights: 21
- Wins: 17
- Win by KO: 7
- Losses: 3
- Draws: 1
Medal record
Men's amateur boxing
Representing England
Commonwealth Games
Gold medal – first place	2010 Delhi	Heavyweight

Simon Vallily (born 15 August 1985) is an English professional boxer. As an amateur, he was a member of the England elite squad as well as the Great British podium squad and won the gold medal in the heavyweight division at the 2010 Commonwealth Games.

== Early life ==
Vallily was born to a Jamaican father and English mother.

== Amateur career ==
Fighting for the South Bank Amateur boxing club in Middlesbrough, Vallily was formerly on the books of Middlesbrough Football Club until disciplinary issues meant that his career in football ended prematurely. Vallily claimed that he started boxing after getting into trouble when he was a kid, and that what he would be doing if he were not boxing would be "not worth thinking about".

In February 2006, he was sentenced to four years in prison following a knife attack. Halfway into his sentence he was released and started to concentrate on his boxing career.

=== Domestic honours ===
In 2009, competing in the super-heavyweight division, Vallily won the senior ABA title in Sheffield at the English Institute of Sport, beating Amin Isa 13-4. Despite touching the canvas himself, the victory included a knockdown of his opponent in the third round.

Speaking of the win and of the fact that he himself had taken a count, Vallily said, "Getting caught gave me a kick up the backside and got me going". Reflecting on the turnaround in his life since being sentenced to jail in 2006 Vallily said, "I've changed since those days and I'm an ABA champion now...All that is behind me and I don't like to look back - I was just a daft kid...I want to look to the future. I'm grown up now and more focused and this is just the start". On 13 November 2010, Vallily was crowned the Great Britain champion after defeating experienced rival Danny Price 4-3 in the tournament held in Liverpool's Echo Arena and televised by the BBC.

=== Commonwealth Games ===
Vallily was part of the England team that competed at the 2010 Commonwealth Games in Delhi, India. Picked at the heavyweight category, Vallily fought his way to the final, defeating Dominic Winrow of the Isle of Man in the first round, Arsene Foukou of Cameroon in the quarter-finals and gaining a walkover against Awusone Yekeni of Ghana in the semifinals.

In the final he claimed the gold medal with a first round stoppage over Northern Ireland's Steven Ward after knocking him to the canvas, having quickly established a 6-1 lead. Speaking of Vallily's performance, coach Rob McCracken said "He's frighteningly good. We've got two years to work with him and there's a real possibility he could win the Olympics".

== Professional career ==
Vallily made his professional debut at York Hall in London on 21 March 2013, defeating Simeon Cover on points over four rounds.

In October 2015, he was sentenced to eight months in prison after pleading guilty to twice breaching a restraining order relating to an ex-girlfriend.

He challenged English cruiserweight champion, Arfan Iqbal, at Metro Radio Arena in Newcastle on 16 June 2018. The fight ended in a split draw with Vallily paying the price for having two points deducted, one for illegal use of his head and another for rabbit punches.

Vallily faced future world champion, Fabio Wardley, for the vacant English heavyweight title at Matchroom Fight Camp in Brentwood, Essex, on 1 August 2020. He lost by stoppage in the third round.

== Professional boxing record ==
21 fights	17 wins	3 losses
By knockout	7	3
By decision	10	0
Draws	1	

No.	Result	Record	Opponent	Type	Round, time	Date	Location	Notes
21	Loss	17–3–1	Fabio Wardley	TKO	3 (10), 1:01	1 Aug 2020	Matchroom Fight Camp, Brentwood, England	For vacant English heavyweight title
20	Win	17–2–1	Phil Williams	PTS	6	19 Dec 2019	Hilton Newcastle Gateshead Hotel, Gateshead, England	
19	Win	16–2–1	Erik Nazaryan	RTD	4 (10), 3:00	28 Aug 2019	Eagles Community Arena, Newcastle, England	
18	Win	15–2–1	Dorian Darch	TKO	2 (8), 2:10	14 Jul 2019	Stadium of Light, Sunderland, Tyne and Wear, England	
17	Win	14–2–1	Jone Volau	TKO	1 (6), 2:43	3 May 2019	Eagles Community Arena, Newcastle, England	
16	Loss	13–2–1	Craig Glover	TKO	8 (10), 1:06	13 Oct 2018	Metro Radio Arena, Newcastle, England	
15	Draw	13–1–1	Arfan Iqbal	SD	10	16 Jun 2018	Metro Radio Arena, Newcastle, England	For English cruiserweight title
14	Win	13–1	Blaise Mendouo	TKO	4 (4), 2:24	17 Feb 2018	Manchester Arena, Manchester, England	
13	Win	12–1	Blaise Mendouo	PTS	6	23 Jun 2017	Walker Activity Dome, Newcastle, Tyne and Wear, England	
12	Win	11–1	Dmitrij Kalinovskij	PTS	4	26 May 2017	Rainton Meadows Arena, Houghton-le-Spring, Tyne and Wear, England	
11	Win	10–1	Artūrs Kuļikauskis	TKO	4 (4), 2:14	4 Mar 2017	Rainton Meadows Arena, Houghton-le-Spring, Tyne and Wear, England	
10	Loss	9–1	Mairis Briedis	TKO	3 (8), 2:36	15 Oct 2016	Echo Arena, Liverpool, Merseyside, England	
9	Win	9–0	Toni Višić	TKO	3 (6), 2:33	10 Jul 2016	Stadium of Light, Sunderland, Tyne and Wear, England	
8	Win	8–0	Remigijus Žiaušys	PTS	6	05 Mar 2016	Rainton Meadows Arena, Houghton-le-Spring, Tyne and Wear, England	
7	Win	7–0	Wladimir Letr	PTS	6	04 Apr 2015	Metro Radio Arena, Newcastle, Tyne and Wear, England	
6	Win	6–0	David Vicena	KO	3 (4), 0:40	08 Mar 2015	Rainton Meadows Arena, Houghton-le-Spring, Tyne and Wear, England	
5	Win	5–0	Jiří Svačina	TD	5 (6), 1:14	04 Oct 2014	First Direct Arena, Leeds, Yorkshire, England	
4	Win	4–0	Moses Matovu	PTS	4	21 May 2014	First Direct Arena, Leeds, Yorkshire, England	
3	Win	3–0	Rolandas Čėsna	PTS	4	7 Oct 2013	Royal Lancaster Hotel, Bayswater, London, England	
2	Win	2–0	Moses Matovu	PTS	4	20 Sep 2013	Hilton Hotel, Mayfair, London, England	
1	Win	1–0	Simeon Cover	PTS	4	21 Mar 2013	York Hall, Bethnal Green, London, England	

== Exhibition boxing record ==
1 fight	0 wins	0 losses
Draws	1	

No.	Result	Record	Opponent	Type	Round, time	Date	Location	Notes
1	Draw	0–0–1	Hafþór Júlíus Björnsson	D	4	28 May 2021	Conrad Hotel, Dubai, U.A.E.	
