= International Boxing Organization =

Sanctioning organization for professional boxing bouts

- Abbreviation: IBO
- Formation: 1988; 38 years ago
- Type: Private
- Purpose: Boxing sanctioning organization
- Headquarters: Coral Gables, Florida, U.S.
- Region served: Worldwide
- President: Ed Levine
- Main organ: Board of Directors
- Website: iboboxing.com

The International Boxing Organization (IBO) is a US based corporation that sanctions professional boxing matches and awards world and regional championships.

It is an independent organization not recognized by the "big four" governing bodies (WBA, WBC, IBF and WBO), who only recognize each other in their rankings and title unification rules. Despite this, as of 2023, IBO titles have been unified with titles of the other bodies in several weight divisions. The WBC website highlights the importance of title recognition and the implications of multiple governing bodies in boxing. While the IBO operates independently, its titles being unified with the WBA, IBF, and WBO in certain divisions demonstrates how these organizations work together despite initial rivalries.

== History ==
The IBO was founded in 1988 and incorporated in Illinois in 1992 by John W. Daddono. The organization was later moved to Florida in 1997 and incorporated in Florida at that time. Ed Levine, who continues to serve as the organization's President became a partner and President of the IBO at that time.

The organization implemented a computerized system 'The Independent World Boxing Rankings' in the late 1990s that removed subjective elements from the ratings in an effort to bring more credibility to the sport. From 2014 the organization now employs Boxrec, the independent boxing records keeper and computerized rankings website to produce IBO's rankings.

The IBO permits only one world champion per weight division. "We have never had more than one champion per weight division nor will we", according to its president Ed Levine.

In addition to world champions, IBO recognizes regional champions, including the Inter-Continental champion. If an IBO Inter-Continental champion successfully defends his title three times, he may receive a mandatory opportunity for the world title.

== Characteristics ==
=== Championship format ===
One of the biggest differences between organizations is the IBO's policy to recognize only one world champion in each weight division. In contrast, other organizations like the WBA have been criticized for having multiple championship titles in the same division, confusing fans and fighters alike. For example, the WBA often has "super" champions and regular champions, which muddies the waters of title recognition.

=== Regional titles ===
The IBO recognizes regional champions, including the Inter-Continental champion, and provides a clear pathway for these fighters to challenge for the world title after successful defenses.

=== Credibility and transparency ===
IBO claims their use of technology in rankings improves transparency and credibility in boxing. The other sanctioning bodies, such as the WBC and WBA, have long and storied histories, but both have come under fire for some of their rankings, which many argue are more reflective of promoters' and political influences than fighters' actual abilities.

== Notable past IBO champions ==
- Nonito Donaire, flyweight
- Marco Antonio Barrera, featherweight
- Naseem Hamed, featherweight
- Manny Pacquiao, light welterweight
- Ricky Hatton, light welterweight
- Floyd Mayweather Jr., welterweight
- Sergio Martínez, super welterweight
- Erislandy Lara, super welterweight
- Dmitry Bivol, light heavyweight
- Bernard Hopkins, light heavyweight
- Roy Jones Jr., light heavyweight
- Antonio Tarver, light heavyweight, cruiserweight
- Thomas Hearns, cruiserweight
- James Toney, cruiserweight
- Brian Nielsen, heavyweight
- Lennox Lewis, heavyweight
- Tyson Fury, heavyweight
- Wladimir Klitschko, heavyweight
- Anthony Joshua, heavyweight
- Oleksandr Usyk, heavyweight

== Current IBO world title holders ==
As of August 11, 2026

=== Male ===
Weight class:	Champion:	Reign began:	Days
Minimumweight	vacant		
Light flyweight	Mpumelelo Tshabalala	September 14, 2024	779
Flyweight	vacant		
Super flyweight	Ricardo Malajika	September 2, 2023	1157
Bantamweight	vacant		
Super bantamweight	Shabaz Masoud	November 2, 2024	730
Featherweight	Dayan Gonzalez	December 6, 2024	696
Super featherweight	Jono Carroll	March 14, 2026	233
Lightweight	vacant		
Super lightweight	Mark Chamberlain	August 1, 2026	93
Welterweight	Tulani Mbenge	October 19, 2024	744
Super welterweight	Uisma Lima	December 12, 2024	690
Middleweight	Chris Eubank Jr	October 12, 2024	751
Super middleweight	Osleys Iglesias	December 9, 2022	1424
Light heavyweight	Dmitry Bivol	February 23, 2025	618
Cruiserweight	Juergen Uldedaj	October 25, 2025	373
Heavyweight	vacant		

=== Female ===
Weight class:	Champion:	Reign began:	Days
Minimumweight	Sarah Bormann	May 21, 2022	1626
Light flyweight	Nina Radovanović	March 23, 2024	954
Flyweight	vacant		
Super flyweight	Angelica Lukas	5 October 2024	758
Bantamweight	vacant		
Super bantamweight	Laura Grzyb	March 15, 2026	232
Featherweight	Amanda Serrano	March 25, 2021	2048
Super featherweight	Alycia Baumgardner	November 13, 2021	1815
Lightweight	Pamela Noutcho Sawa	November 7, 2025	360
Super lightweight	Flora Pili	December 5, 2025	332
Welterweight	Lauren Price	May 11, 2024	905
Super welterweight	Oshae Jones	November 22, 2024	710
Middleweight	vacant		
Super middleweight	vacant		
Light heavyweight	vacant		
Cruiserweight	vacant		
Heavyweight	vacant		

== See also ==
- List of IBO world champions
- List of IBO female world champions
