= Erick Ochieng =

Kenyan-English boxer

Personal information
- Nickname: The Eagle
- Nationality: English; Kenyan
- Born: 5 May 1987 (age 39) Nairobi, Kenya

Boxing career
- Weight class: Light Middleweight; Welterweight
- Stance: Orthodox

Boxing record
- Total fights: 25
- Wins: 16
- Win by KO: 4
- Losses: 8
- Draws: 1
- No contests: 0

Erick Ochieng (born 5 May 1987) is a British professional boxer in the Welterweight division and former BBBofC English super-welterweight champion.

Ochieng was born in Kaloleni, Nairobi, Kenya. He was raised by his grandmother, and following her death, he moved to London aged 11 to join his parents, who had moved to London earlier. Ochieng has fought 65 amateur fights altogether with a record of 55–10.

== Professional career ==
On 23 June 2006 Ochieng beat the British veteran Matt Scriven to win his pro debut. On 18 March 2011 he fought against Luke Robinson - amateur ABA runner-up in 2008. Robinson won by unanimous decision.

On 28 January 2012 Ochieng won against British boxer Nick Quigley and received the first professional belt of his career - BBBofC English in super-welterweight division.

In the last fight (2017) Erick lost the match against Freddy Kiwitt with a score of 11:1:0

== Professional boxing record ==
25 fights	16 wins	8 losses
By knockout	4	2
By decision	12	6
Draws	1	

No.	Result	Record	Opponent	Type	Round, Time	Date	Location	Notes
25	Loss	16–8–1	Freddy Kiwitt	KO	7 (10), 2:29	9 Sep 2017	York Hall, Bethnal Green, England	For vacant BBBofC Southern Area welterweight title
24	Loss	16–7–1	John O'Donnell	SD	10	18 Mar 2017	York Hall, Bethnal Green, England	For vacant BBBofC English welterweight title
23	Loss	16–6–1	Asinia Byfield	PTS	10	15 Oct 2016	York Hall, Bethnal Green, England	For vacant BBBofC Southern Area super-welterweight title
22	Loss	16–5–1	Tamuka Mucha	TKO	6 (10), 2:10	28 May 2015	York Hall, Bethnal Green, England	For vacant BBBofC Southern Area welterweight title
21	Draw	16–4–1	Tom Knight	PTS	8	7 Mar 2015	Ice Arena, Hull, England	
20	Win	16–4	William Warburton	PTS	4	11 Oct 2014	The O2 Arena, Greenwich, London	
19	Win	15–4	Paddy Gallagher	UD	3	5 Apr 2014	York Hall, Bethnal Green, England	Prizefighter Tournament, welterweight quarter-finals; Ochieng stretchered out from the ring after feeling unwell in his corner, Gallagher progressed through the semi-finals
18	Loss	14–4	Neil Perkins	PTS	8	15 Mar 2014	Echo Arena, Liverpool, England	
17	Loss	14–3	Dale Evans	PTS	8	1 Feb 2014	Cardiff International Centre, Cardiff, Wales	
16	Loss	14–2	Liam Smith	UD	12	21 Sep 2013	Olympia, Liverpool, England	For vacant British super-welterweight title
15	Win	14–1	Simone Lucas	PTS	6	29 Jun 2013	Bolton Arena, Bolton, England	
14	Win	13–1	Frederic Serre	PTS	8	9 Mar 2013	Wembley Arena, Wembley, England	
13	Win	12–1	Max Maxwell	UD	10	8 Dec 2012	Olympia, Kensington, England	Retained BBBofC English super-welterweight title
12	Win	11–1	Ryan Toms	TKO	5 (10), 2:37	8 Sep 2012	Alexandra Palace, Muswell Hill, London	Retained BBBofC English super-welterweight title
11	Win	10–1	AA Lowe	UD	10	26 May 2012	Nottingham Arena, Nottingham, England	Retained BBBofC English super-welterweight title
10	Win	9–1	Nick Quigley	RTD	9 (10), 0:10	28 Jan 2012	York Hall, Bethnal Green, England	Won vacant BBBofC English super-welterweight title
9	Win	8–1	Dee Mitchell	PTS	6	9 Nov 2011	York Hall, Bethnal Green, England	
8	Win	7–1	Liam Cameron	PTS	8	28 May 2011	Hillsborough Leisure Centre, Sheffield, England	
7	Loss	6–1	Luke Robinson	PTS	4	18 Mar 2011	York Hall, Bethnal Green, England	
6	Win	6–0	Lee Noble	PTS	6	5 Feb 2011	Brentwood Centre, Brentwood, England	
5	Win	5–0	Alex Spitko	TKO	4 (4), 2:41	11 Sep 2010	York Hall, Bethnal Green, England	
4	Win	4–0	Curtis Valentine	PTS	4	14 May 2010	Goresbrook Leisure Centre, Dagenham, England	
3	Win	3–0	Jon Harrison	KO	2 (4), 0:50	22 Jan 2010	Brentwood Centre, Brentwood, England	
2	Win	2–0	Prince Davis	PTS	4	20 Nov 2009	Harvey Hadden Leisure Centre, Nottingham, England	
1	Win	1–0	Matt Scriven	PTS	4	11 Sep 2009	Brentwood Centre, Brentwood, England	
