= List of Albanians in Germany =

The following is a list of notable Germans of Albanian descent.

== Politics ==
- Aferdita Suka – politician
- Elyesa Bazna – secret agent for Nazi Germany during World War II
- Shqiprim Arifi – politician and businessman
- Zana Ramadani – politician, feminist activist and author

== Science and academia ==
- Fatmir Dalladaku – cardiac surgeon
- Mira Mezini – computer scientist

== Writers ==
- Anila Wilms – writer
- Ferdinand Laholli – poet
- Lindita Arapi – writer and journalist
- Thanas Jorgji – author

== Business and civil society ==
- Nicolas Berggruen – philanthropist and investor

== Arts and entertainment ==
- Adela Demetja – art curator

=== Cinema ===
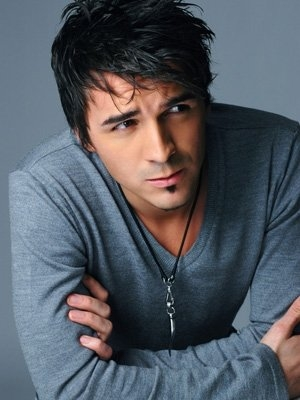
Blerim Destani is an actor and film producer.

- Bettina Moissi – stage and film actress
- Blerim Destani – actor and film producer
- Gedeon Burkhard – film and television actor
- Heinrich Schmieder – actor
- İrem Helvacıoğlu – actress
- Nur Fettahoğlu – actress

=== Musicians ===
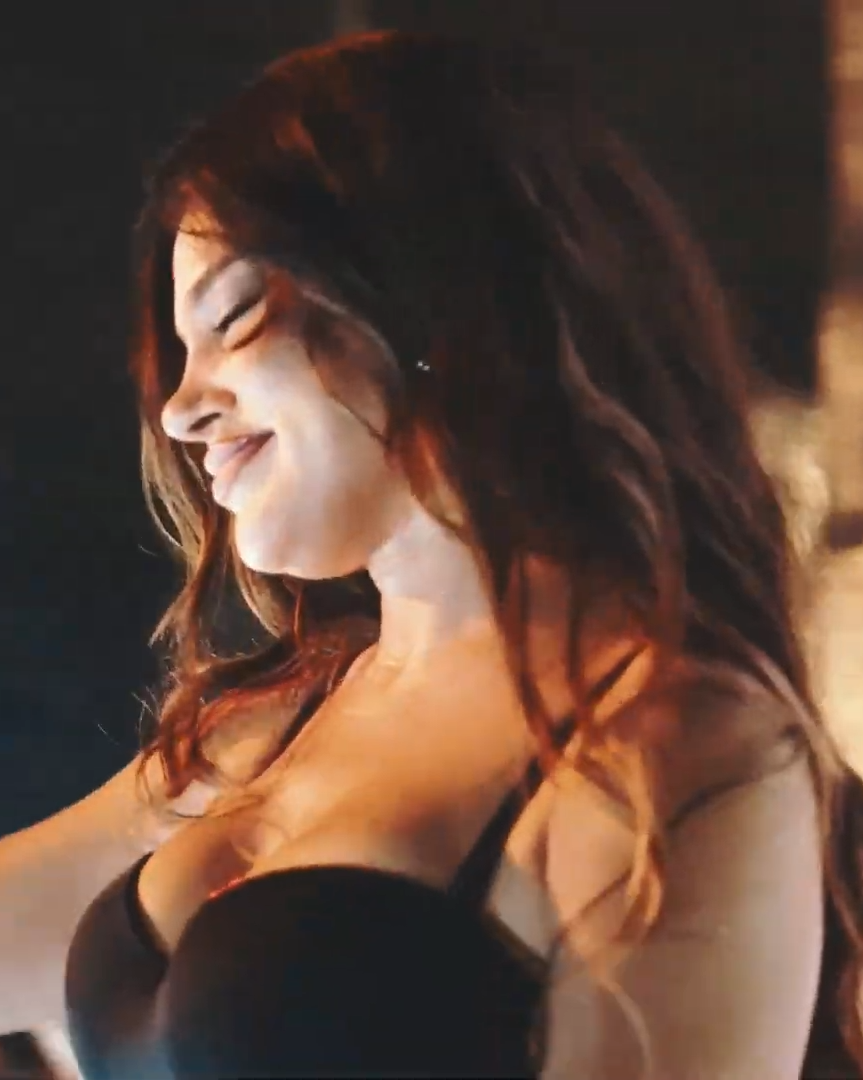
Dhurata Dora is a popular singer/songwriter.

- Ardian Bujupi – singer and songwriter
- Azet – rapper
- Blerando – singer, songwriter and rapper
- Butrint Imeri – singer
- Dardan – rapper
- Dhurata Dora – singer and songwriter
- DJ Gimi-O – DJ and producer
- Fifi – singer
- Gent – rapper
- Miriam Cani – singer and television personality
- Njomza – singer and songwriter
- Vanessa Krasniqi – singer

== Sports ==
=== Football ===
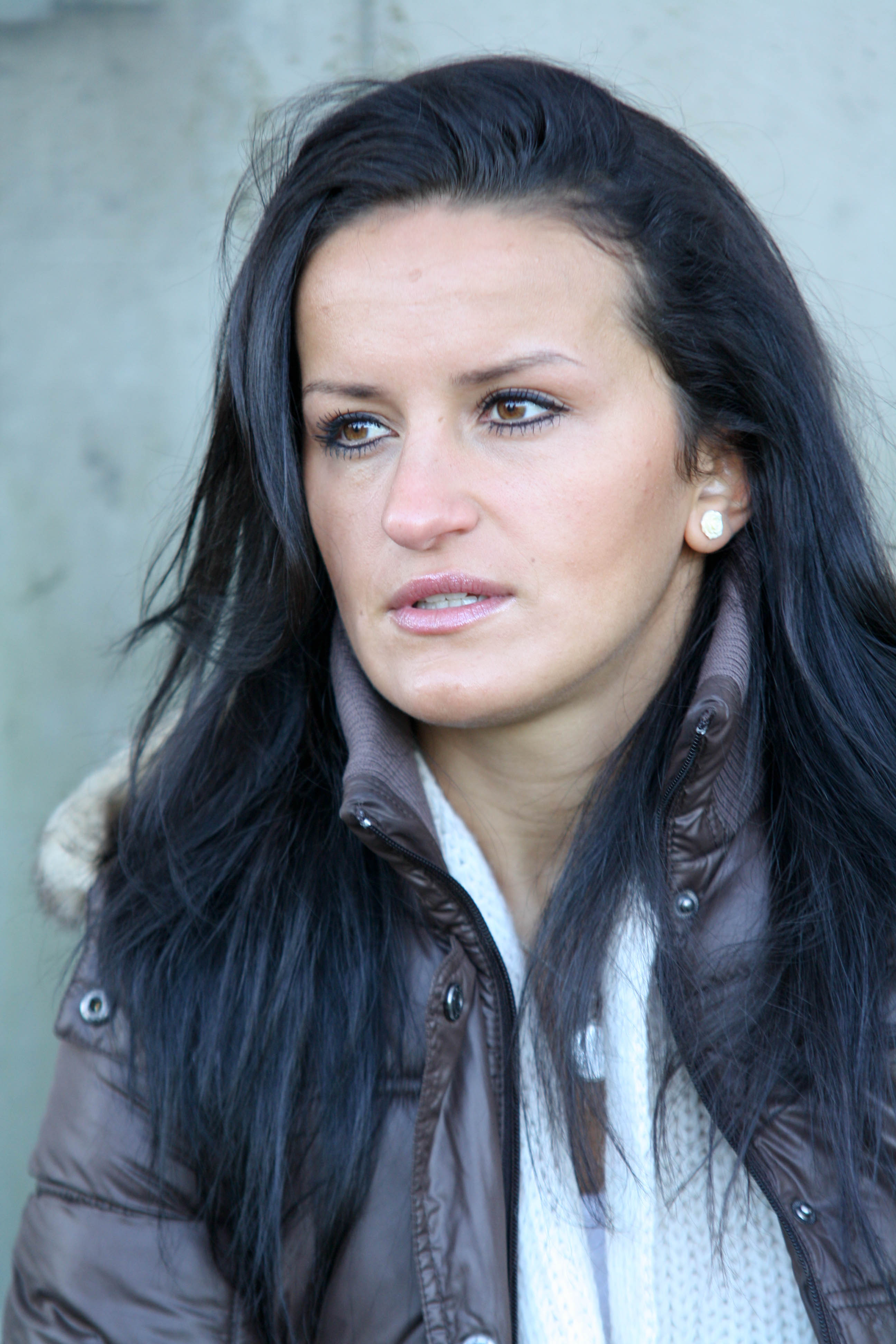
Fatmire Bajramaj placed third in the 2010 FIFA Ballon d'Or competition, an award given to the world's best player.

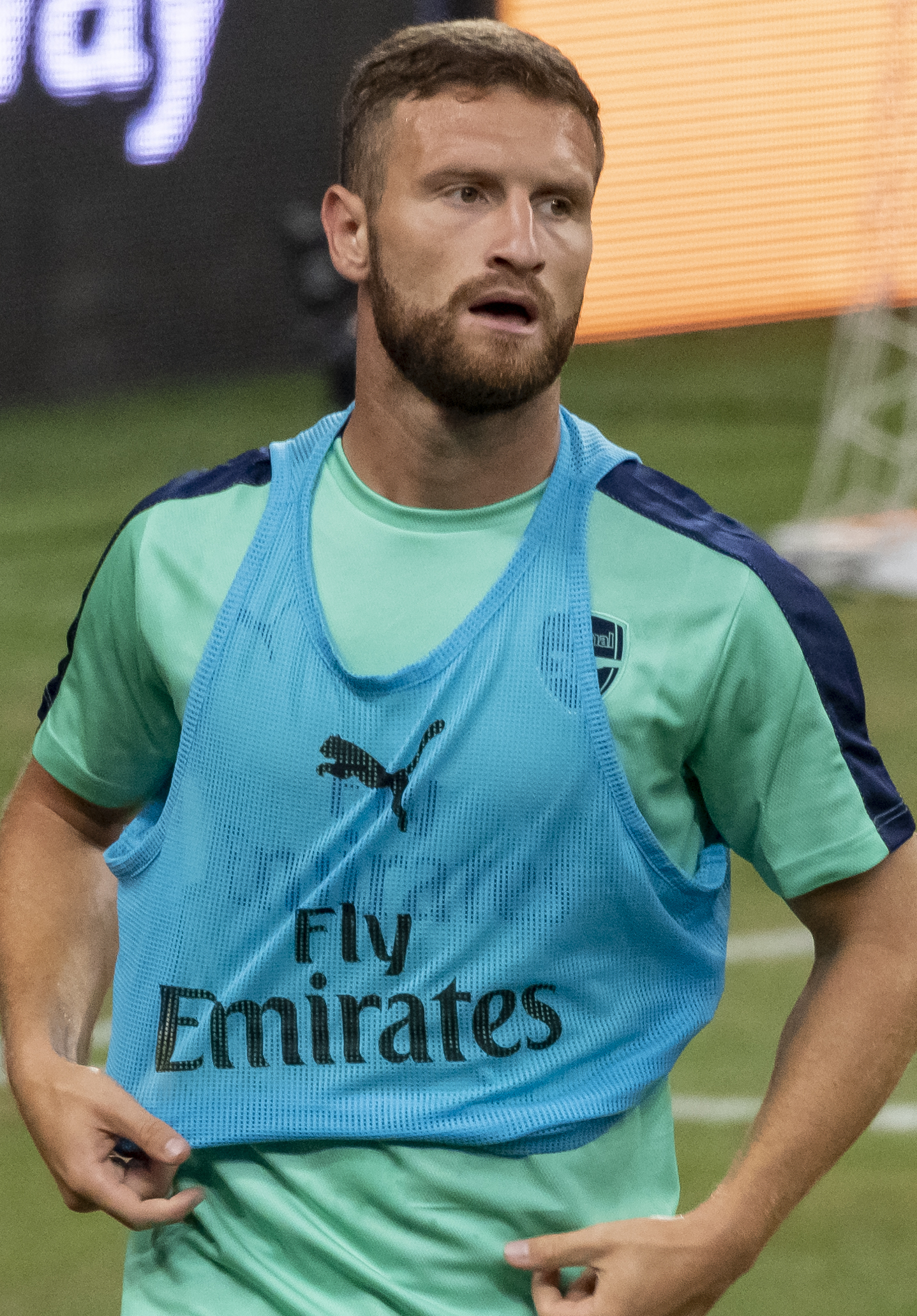
Shkodran Mustafi was part of the German national team that won the 2014 FIFA World Cup.

- Ali Ibrahimaj – footballer
- Alban Meha – footballer
- Arianit Ferati – footballer
- Besar Halimi – footballer
- Blendi Idrizi – footballer
- Brajan Gruda – footballer
- Daniel Caligiuri – footballer of Arbëreshë descent
- Diant Ramaj – footballer
- Donis Avdijaj – footballer
- Dren Feka – footballer
- Edon Zhegrova – footballer
- Elvis Rexhbeçaj – footballer
- Enis Alushi – footballer
- Enis Bunjaki – footballer
- Fatmire Bajramaj – footballer
- Faton Toski – footballer
- Florent Muslija – footballer
- Jürgen Gjasula – footballer
- Klaus Gjasula – footballer
- Leart Paqarada – footballer
- Marco Caligiuri – footballer of Italo-Albanian/Arbëreshë descent
- Marvin Çuni – footballer
- Meritan Shabani – footballer
- Mërgim Berisha – footballer
- Mërgim Mavraj – footballer
- Nelson Weiper – footballer
- Shkodran Mustafi – footballer
- Tim Civeja – footballer
- Valentina Limani – footballer
- Valmir Sulejmani – footballer

=== Boxing ===
- Arber Bellegu – professional boxer and MMA trainer
- Besar Nimani – professional boxer
- Besim Kabashi – kickboxer
- Juergen Uldedaj – professional boxer
- Luan Krasniqi – boxer
- Mirdi Limani – kickboxer
- Robin Krasniqi – professional boxer
- Valdet Gashi – kickboxer and Muay Thai fighter

=== Other sports ===
- Kristian Bećiri – handball player
- Lirim Zendeli – racing driver
