= Paramjeet Samota =

Indian boxer

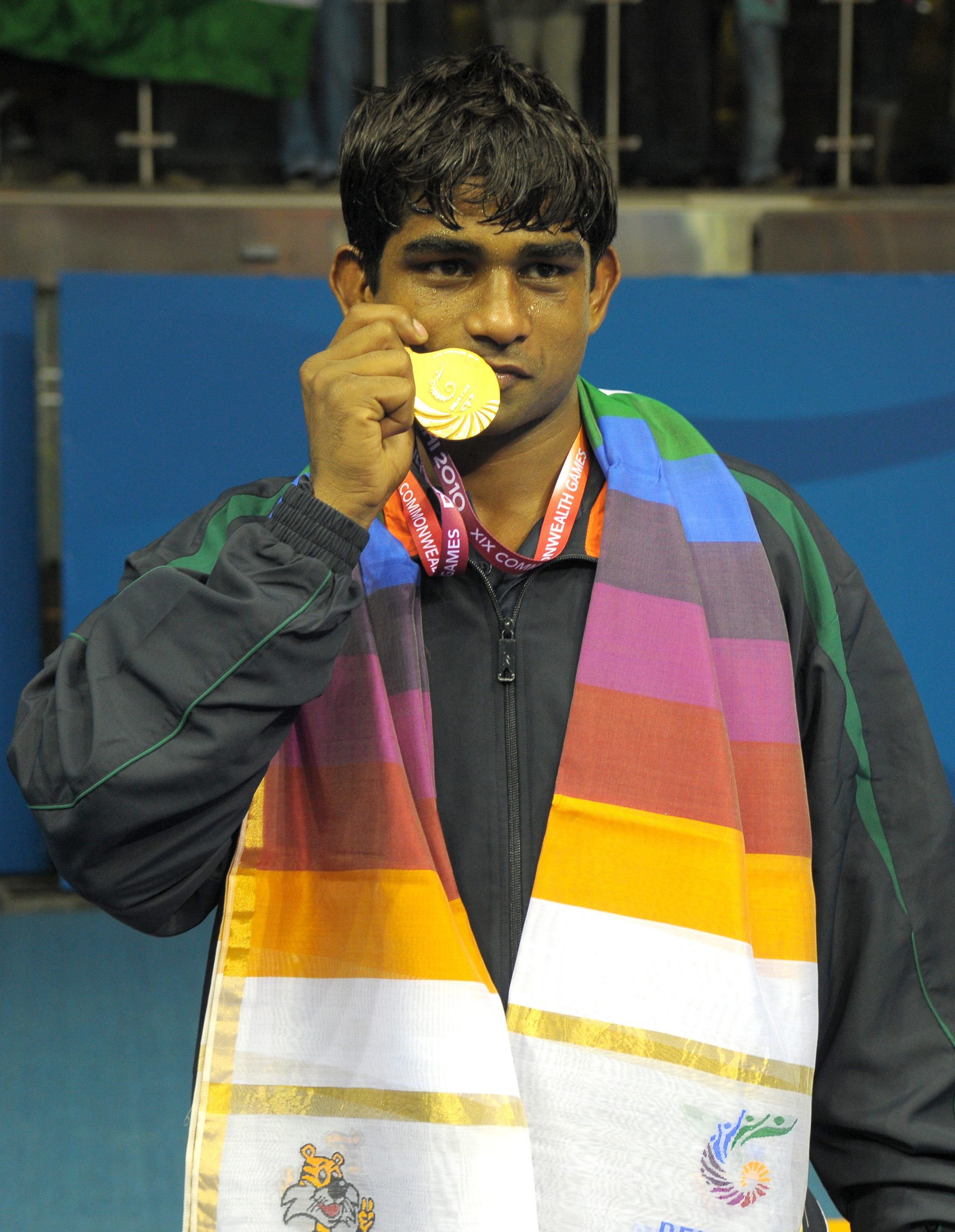
- XIX Commonwealth Games-2010 Delhi (Men’s) Boxing Heavy Weight 91Kg Event Samota Paramjeet of India won the Gold Medal, at Talkatora Indoor Stadium, in New Delhi on October on October 13, 2010.

Personal information
- Nationality: Indian
- Born: 5 July 1988 (age 38) Dinod village, Bhiwani district
- Height: 183 cm (6 ft 0 in)

Boxing career
Medal record
Men's amateur boxing
Representing India
Asian Games
Bronze medal – third place	2010 Guangzhou	Super heavyweight
Commonwealth Games
Gold medal – first place	2010 Delhi	Super heavyweight
Asian Championships
Bronze medal – third place	2009 Zhuhai	Super-heavyweight
Bronze medal – third place	2011 Incheon	Heavyweight

Paramjeet Samota (born 5 July 1988) is an Indian amateur boxer best known for winning a Commonwealth Games Gold Medal in 2010 at Super Heavyweight.

== Early life ==
Samota grew up in Dinod, a village near Bhiwani.

== Career ==
Samota won a gold medal in the Super heavyweight category at the 2010 Commonwealth Games, defeating Tariq Abdul Haqq of Trinidad and Tobago 5–1. In the fifth Commonwealth Boxing Championships held in New Delhi from 10 to 18 March 2010, he, along with five other fellow Indians, won a gold medal, defeating New Zealand's Joseph Parker 7–3. He won a bronze medal in the Men's Super heavyweight category at the 2010 Asian Games, as he lost in the semifinals to eventual winner Zhang Zhilei.
