= Juergen Uldedaj =

Albanian boxer (born 1997)

Jurgen Uldedaj
Personal information
- Nationality: Albanian
- Born: 26 August 1997 (age 29) Lezhë, Albania
- Height: 6 ft 1.5 in (187 cm)
- Weight: Cruiserweight

Boxing career
- Reach: 70 in (178 cm)
- Stance: Orthodox

Boxing record
- Total fights: 23
- Wins: 22
- Win by KO: 8
- Losses: 1

Jurgen Uldedaj (born 26 August 1997) is an Albanian professional boxer. He has held the IBO cruiserweight title since October 2025.

== Professional boxing career ==
Uldedaj made his professional debut against Mateusz Gatek on 14 December 2015. He won the fight by unanimous decision. Uldedaj amassed a 7–0 record during the next two years, with two of those victories coming by way of stoppage.

Uldedaj fought for his first professional title on 3 February 2018, when he faced Jakub Synek for the vacant German International cruiserweight title. The fight was scheduled for the undercard of the Tom Schwarz and Samir Nebo heavyweight bout, and was broadcast by MDR Fernsehen. Uldedaj won the fight ten round bout of his career by unanimous decision, with two judges scoring the fight 100–89 in his favor, while the third judge scored it 100–88 for him.

Uldedaj faced the undefeated Dode Tahiri Arganaraz for the vacant WBO Youth cruiserweight title on 15 December 2018, at the Olympic Park “Feti Borova” in Tirana, Albania, which was his first fight in Albania. Uldedaj captured the title by unanimous decision, with all three judges scoring the fight 98–91 for him. Uldedaj was scheduled to face Krzysztof Twardowski on 11 May 2019, for the interim WBC Youth title. He won the fight by unanimous decision, with all three judges awarding him a 97–93 scorecard.

Uldedaj faced Robert Grguric on 22 August 2020, following a 13-month absence from the sport. He won the fight by a second-round knockout. Uldedaj next faced the overmatched Bojan Cestic on 12 December 2020. He won the fight stoppage, as Cestic retired from the bout at the end of the third round.

Uldedaj was booked to face Dmytro Serguta for the vacant WBC Youth cruiserweight title on 17 July 2021, on the undercard of an MDR broadcast card. He won the bout by a seventh-round technical knockout, extending his finishing streak to three consecutive fights.

After losing his unbeaten record on points to Benoit Huber at The O2 Arena in London on 1 April 2023, he bounced back immediately in his next fight by winning the vacant IBO Mediterranean cruiserweight title by unanimous decision against John Franck Mendy at York Hall in London on 10 February 2024.

On 19 July 2024, Uldedaj faced Steven Ward for the vacant IBF International cruiserweight title at Motorspace Dubai Investments Park in Dubai, winning by stoppage in the fifth round.

He retained the title by stopping Edin Puhalo in the second round at The Hall in Dübendorf, Switzerland, on 20 December 2024.

Returning to the scene of his only professional defeat, The O2 Arena in London, Uldedaj faced Rolly Lambert Fogoum for the vacant IBO cruiserweight title on 25 October 2025. This time he came away from the venue with the win, claiming the belt via unanimous decision.

He successfully defended the title against Austine Nnamdi at Wembley Arena in London on 30 May 2026, winning by unanimous decision.

== Professional boxing record ==
23 fights	22 wins	1 loss
By knockout	8	0
By decision	14	1

No.	Result	Record	Opponent	Type	Round, time	Date	Location	Notes
23	Win	22–1	(United Kingdom) Austine Nnamdi	UD	12	30 May 2026	(United Kingdom) Wembley Arena, London, England	Retained IBO cruiserweight title
22	Win	21–1	(Cameroon) Rolly Lambert Fogoum	UD	12	25 Oct 2025	(United Kingdom) The O2 Arena, London, England	Won vacant IBO cruiserweight title
21	Win	20–1	(Chile) Gerardo Mellado	UD	10	5 Apr 2025	(United Kingdom) Co-op Live, Manchester, England	
20	Win	19–1	(Bosnia and Herzegovina) Edin Puhalo	TKO	2 (10), 2:40	20 Dec 2024	The Hall, Dübendorf, Switzerland	Retained IBF International cruiserweight title
19	Win	18–1	(Republic of Ireland) Steven Ward	TKO	5 (10), 2:46	19 Jul 2024	Motorspace Dubai Investments Park, Dubai, United Arab Emirates	Won vacant IBF International cruiserweight title
18	Win	17–1	(Bosnia and Herzegovina) Damir Beljo	UD	10	20 Apr 2024	BMW Park, Munich, Germany	
17	Win	16–1	(France) John Franck Mendy	UD	10	10 Feb 2024	(United Kingdom) York Hall, Bethnal Green, England	Won vacant IBO Mediterranean cruiserweight title
16	Loss	15–1	(Switzerland) Benoit Huber	PTS	8	1 Apr 2023	(United Kingdom) The O2 Arena, London, England	
15	Win	15–0	(Argentina) Bruno Igor Hong	TKO	4 (8), 2:36	4 Feb 2023	(United Kingdom) York Hall, Bethnal Green, England	
14	Win	14–0	(Ukraine) Dmytro Serguta	TKO	7 (8), 1:12	17 Jul 2021	Seebühne Elbauenpark, Magdeburg, Germany	Won vacant WBC Youth cruiserweight title
13	Win	13–0	(Bosnia and Herzegovina) Bojan Cestic	RTD	3 (8), 3:00	12 Dec 2020	Maritim Hotel, Magdeburg, Germany	
12	Win	12–9	(Croatia) Robert Grgurić	KO	2 (8), 1:25	22 Aug 2020	Seebühne Elbauenpark, Magdeburg, Germany	
11	Win	11–0	(Poland) Krzysztof Twardowski	UD	10	11 May 2019	Stadthalle, Magdeburg, Germany	Won interim WBC Youth cruiserweight title
10	Win	10–0	(Argentina) Nicolas Leandro Arganaraz	UD	10	15 Dec 2018	Tirana Olympic Park, Tirana, Albania	Won vacant WBO Youth cruiserweight title
9	Win	9–0	(France) Morgan Dessaux	UD	6	15 Sep 2018	Stadthalle, Magdeburg, Germany	
8	Win	8–0	(Czech Republic) Jakub Synek	UD	10	3 Feb 2018	Erdgas Arena, Halle an der Saale, Germany	Won vacant German International cruiserweight title
7	Win	7–0	(Czech Republic) Radek Geissmann	TKO	3 (6), 1:25	2 Dec 2017	Sluneta, Ústí nad Labem, Czech Republic	
6	Win	6–0	(Albania) Ziso Poulitsa	UD	6	18 Mar 2017	Arena Leipzig, Leipzig, Germany	
5	Win	5–0	(Georgia (country)) Giorgi Tevdorashvili	RTD	3 (6), 3:00	4 Feb 2017	Maritim Hotel, Magdeburg, Germany	
4	Win	4–0	(Czech Republic) Ondřej Budera	UD	6	2 Nov 2016	GETEC Arena, Magdeburg, Germany	
3	Win	3–0	(Germany) Ben Nsafoah	UD	4	4 Jun 2016	Seebühne Elbauenpark, Magdeburg, Germany	
2	Win	2–0	(Germany) Sven Haselhuhn	UD	4	30 Apr 2016	Jahrhunderthalle, Spergau, Germany	
1	Win	1–0	(Poland) Mateusz Gatek	UD	4	14 Nov 2015	Anhalt Arena, Dessau, Germany	

== See also ==
- List of Albanians in Germany
