= Marc Montgomery =

Marc Montgomery may refer to:

- Marc Montgomery, voice actor in Animal Crackers (TV series)
- Marc Montgomery, candidate for Mid Sussex (UK Parliament constituency)
- Marc Montgomery (presenter) on Radio Canada International

== See also ==
- Mark Montgomery (disambiguation)
