= Shooting at the 2010 Commonwealth Games – Men's 25 metre standard pistol singles =

The Men's 25 metre standard pistol singles event took place at 13 October 2010 at the CRPF Campus.

== Results ==
| Rank | Name | Country | 150 sec | 20 sec | 10 sec | Total |
|---|---|---|---|---|---|---|
| 1st place, gold medalist(s) | Bin Gai | Singapore | 195 | 187 | 188 | 570^{14} (FGR) |
| 2nd place, silver medalist(s) | Roger Daniel | Trinidad and Tobago | 189 | 191 | 183 | 563^{12} |
| 3rd place, bronze medalist(s) | Samaresh Jung | India | 188 | 187 | 184 | 559^{11} |
| 4 | Lip Poh | Singapore | 192 | 188 | 177 | 557^{9} |
| 5 | Hasli Amir | Malaysia | 185 | 183 | 186 | 554^{7} |
| 6 | Mustaqeem Shah | Pakistan | 192 | 186 | 174 | 552^{6} |
| 7 | Mick Gault | England | 194 | 183 | 174 | 551^{12} |
| 8 | Christopher Roberts | Australia | 185 | 187 | 177 | 549^{7} |
| 9 | Rhodney Allen | Trinidad and Tobago | 191 | 182 | 174 | 547^{10} |
| 10 | David Moore | Australia | 190 | 184 | 173 | 547^{7} |
