= Trinidad and Tobago and the Islamic State =

Trinidad and Tobago had one of the higher proportional recruitment rates for the Islamic State, with over 100 citizens joining. British academic Simon Cottee nicknamed it Calypso Caliphate.

== Members ==
- Tariq Abdul Haqq, a boxer who had been a Commonwealth Games medalist, killed in 2015
- Abu Sa'd al-Trinidadi, born Shane Crawford, killed in 2017

== See also ==
- Jamaat al Muslimeen coup attempt
