= Tommy McCarthy (boxer) =

Irish boxer (born 1990)

Personal information
- Nationality: Irish
- Born: 4 November 1990 (age 35) London, England
- Height: 6 ft 2 1/2 in (189 cm)
- Weight: Cruiserweight

Boxing career
- Reach: 75 1/2 in (192 cm)
- Stance: Orthodox

Boxing record
- Total fights: 28
- Wins: 21
- Win by KO: 10
- Losses: 7
Medal record
Men's amateur boxing
Representing Northern Ireland
Commonwealth Games
Silver medal – second place	2010 Delhi	Light-heavyweight
Representing Ireland
Youth World Championships
Bronze medal – third place	2008 Guadalajara	Light-heavyweight

Tommy McCarthy (born 4 November 1990) is an Irish former professional boxer who held the European cruiserweight title. As an amateur he won the silver medal for Northern Ireland in the light-heavyweight division at the 2010 Commonwealth Games and a bronze medal for Ireland at the 2008 Youth World Championships.

== Professional career ==
Following an amateur career which included winning a silver medal at the 2010 Commonwealth Games and a bronze at the 2008 Youth World Championships, McCarthy made his professional boxing debut against Rolandas Cesna on 24 May 2014. He won the fight by a third-round technical knockout. McCarthy fought three more times in 2014 and won all three fights by stoppage: against Imantas Davidaitis on 21 June, against Dimitar Spaiyski on 4 October, and Martin Horak on 15 November.

McCarthy fought four more times in 2015. He first notched a sixth-round technical knockout of Jakub Wojcik on 20 February 2015. McCarthy next scored points victories against Courtney Fry on 1 August and Martin Szatmari on 5 December. His last of the year, against Vladimir Reznicek, came just a week after his victory over Szatmari. McCarthy won the fight by points.

McCarthy faced Jon-Lewis Dickinson on 28 May 2016, and won by unanimous decision. It was the first ten-round bout of his career. McCarthy was next scheduled to face Matty Askin on 19 November 2016. He suffered the first loss of his professional career, as he lost by unanimous decision.

McCarthy rebounded from the first loss of his professional career with a first-round technical knockout of Peter Hegyes on 21 October 2017. McCarthy was then scheduled to face Blaise Mendouo on 18 November 2017. He won the fight on points.

McCarthy's sole fight of 2018 came against Kent Kauppinen on 17 November. He won the fight on points.

McCarthy was scheduled to face Jiri Svacina on 9 February 2019. He won the fight on points. McCarthy's four-fight winning streak earned McCarthy the chance to challenge the incumbent WBA Inter-continental Cruiserweight champion Richard Riakporhe on 2 March 2019. Riakporhe won the fight by a fourth-round technical knockout.

Following his loss to Riakporhe, McCarthy re-matched Jiri Svacina on 18 May 2019, and won by a third-round technical knockout. McCarthy was scheduled to face Francesco Cataldo on 11 July 2019 in Rome, which was his first fight outside of the British Isles. Cataldo retired from the fight at the end of the second round.

McCarthy was scheduled to fight the reigning WBC International cruiserweight champion Fabio Turchi on 11 October 2019. He won the fight by split decision.

McCarthy fought Bilal Laggoune for the European cruiserweight title on 31 October 2020. He won the fight by majority decision. McCarthy made the first defense of his European title against Alexandru Jur on 15 May 2021. He won the fight by a sixth-round knockout.

McCarthy was scheduled to fight Chris Billam-Smith on 31 July 2021. The fight was a defense of his European cruiserweight title, a challenge for Billam-Smith's Commonwealth title, and a fight for the vacant British cruiserweight title. The bout was set as the main event of a Matchroom Boxing card, which was broadcast by DAZN. McCarthy lost the fight by split decision, with scores of 116–112, 115-115 and 116–115. McCarthy expressed his surprise at the scorecards after the fight, stating: "“When I heard that score of 116-112 I just walked out of the ring in disgust... How could one of the judges have it eight rounds to four after a fight like that?". McCarthy was booked to face Billam-Smith in an immediate rematch on 16 April 2022. McCarthy lost the fight by an eight-round technical knockout.

McCarthy was stopped in the seventh-round by Michal Cieslak in a challenge to regain the European cruiserweight title in Poland on 4 November 2023.

On 27 January 2024, McCarthy was stopped in the fourth-round by Cheavon Clarke in a contest for the vacant WBA cruiserweight Intercontinental title at Ulster Hall, Belfast, Northern Ireland.

He faced Steven Ward at the SSE Arena in Belfast on 1 March 2025, losing by stoppage in the sixth round. McCarthy announced his retirement from professional boxing a few days later.

== Personal life ==
His cousin is the English musician Labrinth. Following his retirement from boxing, McCarthy announced plans to pursue a career as a stand-up comedian.

== Professional boxing record ==
28 fights	21 wins	7 losses
By knockout	10	5
By decision	11	2

No.	Result	Record	Opponent	Type	Round, time	Date	Location	Notes
28	Loss	21–7	Steven Ward	PTS	6 (10)	1 Mar 2025	The SSE Arena, Belfast, Northern Ireland	
27	Win	21–6	Ryan Labourn	PTS	6	1 Nov 2024	The SSE Arena, Belfast, Northern Ireland	
26	Loss	20–6	Cheavon Clarke	TKO	4 (10), 1:28	27 Jan 2024	Ulster Hall, Belfast, Northern Ireland	For vacant WBA Inter-Continental cruiserweight title
25	Loss	20–5	Michal Cieslak	TKO	7 (12), 1:05	4 Nov 2023	Nosalowy Dwór, Zakopane, Poland	For European cruiserweight title
24	Win	20–4	Reinis Porozovs	PTS	8	4 Sep 2022	Europa Hotel, Belfast, Northern Ireland	
23	Win	19–4	Pauls Vilbergs	TKO	2 (6), 0:45	11 Jun 2022	Tondi 17 Boxing Hall, Tallinn, Estonia	
22	Loss	18–4	Chris Billam-Smith	TKO	8 (12), 1:28	16 Apr 2022	AO Arena, Manchester, England	For European and Commonwealth cruiserweight titles
21	Loss	18–3	Chris Billam-Smith	SD	12	31 Jul 2021	Matchroom Headquarters, Brentwood, England	Lost European cruiserweight title; For Commonwealth and vacant British cruiserweight titles
20	Win	18–2	Alexandru Jur	KO	6 (12), 2:20	15 May 2021	AO Arena, Manchester, England	Retained European cruiserweight title
19	Win	17–2	Bilal Laggoune	MD	12	31 Oct 2020	The SSE Arena, London, England	Won European cruiserweight title
18	Win	16–2	Fabio Turchi	SD	12	11 Oct 2019	PalaTrento, Trento, Italy	Won WBC International cruiserweight title
17	Win	15–2	Francesco Cataldo	RTD	2 (8)	11 Jul 2019	Stadio Nicola Pietrangeli, Rome, Italy	
16	Win	14–2	Jiri Svacina	TKO	3 (6), 2:01	18 May 2019	Europa Hotel, Belfast, Northern Ireland	
15	Loss	13–2	Richard Riakporhe	TKO	4 (10), 2:45	2 Mar 2019	East of England Arena, Peterborough, England	For WBA Inter-Continental cruiserweight title
14	Win	13–1	Jiri Svacina	PTS	8	9 Feb 2019	Ulster Hall, Belfast, Northern Ireland	
13	Win	12–1	Kent Kauppinen	PTS	6	17 Nov 2018	Shorts Sports & Social Club, Belfast, Northern Ireland	
12	Win	11–1	Blaise Mendouo	PTS	6	18 Nov 2017	Odyssey Complex, Belfast, Northern Ireland	
11	Win	10–1	Peter Hegyes	TKO	1 (6), 2:33	21 Oct 2017	Odyssey Complex, Belfast, Northern Ireland	
10	Loss	9–1	Matty Askin	UD	12	19 Nov 2016	Victoria Warehouse, Manchester, England	
9	Win	9–0	Jon-Lewis Dickinson	UD	10	28 May 2016	OVO Hydro, Glasgow, Scotland	
8	Win	8–0	Vladimir Reznicek	PTS	6	12 Dec 2015	Hilton Hotel, Blackpool, England	
7	Win	7–0	Martin Szatmari	PTS	6	5 Dec 2015	Westcroft Leisure Centre, Carshalton, England	
6	Win	6–0	Courtney Fry	PTS	8	1 Aug 2015	Marquee, Belfast, Northern Ireland	
5	Win	5–0	Jakub Wojcik	TKO	6 (6), 1:30	20 Feb 2015	Red Cow Moran Hotel, Dublin, Ireland	
4	Win	4–0	Martin Horak	TKO	2 (4), 0:59	15 Nov 2014	3Arena, Dublin, Ireland	
3	Win	3–0	Dimitar Spaiyski	TKO	1 (4), 1:07	4 Oct 2014	Devenish Complex, Belfast, Northern Ireland	
2	Win	2–0	Imantas Davidaitis	TKO	2 (4), 2:27	21 Jun 2014	Bowlers Exhibition Centre, Manchester, England	
1	Win	1–0	Rolandas Cesna	TKO	3 (4), 0:43	24 May 2014	Dewsbury Leisure Centre, Dewsbury, England	
