= Steven Ward (boxer) =

Irish boxer (born 1990)

Personal information
- Nickname: The Quiet Man
- Born: 18 April 1990 (age 36) Belfast, Northern Ireland
- Height: 6 ft 2 in (188 cm)
- Weight: Cruiserweight, Light-heavyweight, Heavyweight

Boxing career
- Stance: Orthodox

Boxing record
- Total fights: 19
- Wins: 15
- Win by KO: 5
- Losses: 4
Medal record
Representing Northern Ireland
Commonwealth Games
Silver medal – second place	2010 Delhi	Heavyweight

Steven Ward (born 18 April 1990) is an Irish former professional boxer. He held the WBO European light-heavyweight title in 2019. As an amateur, Ward won the silver medal in the heavyweight category at the 2010 Commonwealth Games.

== Career ==
After an amateur career which included winning the heavyweight division silver medal at the 2010 Commonwealth Games and three Ulster senior titles, Ward turned professional in August 2016. He made his pro-debut on 5 November that year at the Titanic Exhibition Centre in Belfast, defeating Merdjidin Yuseinov on points over four rounds.

With a perfect record of seven wins from seven contests, Ward claimed his first professional title by beating Steve Collins Jr. on points for the vacant BUI Celtic light-heavyweight championship at Windsor Park in Belfast on 18 August 2018.

He faced Liam Conroy for the vacant WBO European light-heavyweight title at Ulster Hall in Belfast on 21 June 2019. The bout was halted in the eighth round because of a cut he sustained during an accidental clash of heads. At that stage, all three ringside judges' scorecards had Ward ahead 76–75, meaning he won the contest via unanimous technical decision.

Ward made the first defense of his title against Ričards Bolotņiks at the Brentwood Centre in Brentwood, England, on 14 December 2019, in a fight which doubled as a quarter-final in the Golden Contract tournament run by MTK Global. He was knocked to the canvas three times in the opening round before the referee stopped the bout, handing his opponent a technical knockout victory.

On 16 January 2021, Ward faced 2018 World's Strongest Man and Game of Thrones star, Hafþór Júlíus Björnsson, in a three-round exhibition match at the Conrad Hotel in Dubai. The contest was declared a draw.

Switching up in weight categories to cruiserweight, he fought Kamshybek Kunkabayev for the vacant WBA Gold title at CSKA Sport Complex in Almaty, Kazakhstan, on 11 December 2021. Ward suffered a severe cut caused by what the referee ruled to be an accidental elbow from his opponent which forced the fight to be ended in round seven. He lost via unanimous technical decision as all three judges had Kunkabayev 70–62 in the lead at the time of the stoppage.

A more than two-year hiatus from the competitive boxing ring followed, before Ward returned to action on 30 March 2024, recording a points win over six rounds against Perry Howe at Ulster Hall in Belfast.

On 19 July 2024, he faced Juergen Uldedaj for the vacant IBF International cruiserweight title at Motorspace Dubai Investments Park in Dubai, taking the fight at two weeks notice after Uldedaj's original opponent, Claudio Squeo, withdrew due to injury. Ward lost by stoppage in the fifth round.

He got back to winning ways in his next outing, stopping Tommy McCarthy in the sixth of their scheduled 10-round contest at the SSE Arena in Belfast on 1 March 2025.

Ward faced Mike Perez for the vacant WBA Intercontinental cruiserweight title at Portman Road in Ipswich, England, on 7 June 2025. He was sent to the canvas twice in the eighth round and again in the ninth, at which point his corner threw in the towel to end the fight.

Ward announced his retirement from professional boxing on 23 June 2025.

== Personal life ==
Ward founded and runs Fight2Thrive, an organisation aimed at helping young people in Northern Ireland to improve their mental and physical fitness.

== Professional boxing record ==
19 fights	15 wins	4 losses
By knockout	5	3
By decision	9	1
By disqualification	1	0

No.	Result	Record	Opponent	Type	Round, time	Date	Location	Notes
19	Loss	15–4	Mike Perez	TKO	9 (10), 0:49	7 Jun 2025	Portman Road, Ipswich, England	For vacant WBA Intercontinental cruiserweight title
18	Win	15–3	Tommy McCarthy	TKO	6 (10), 1:17	1 Mar 2025	SSE Arena, Belfast, Northern Ireland	
17	Loss	14–3	Juergen Uldedaj	TKO	5 (10), 2:46	19 Jul 2024	Motorspace Dubai Investments Park, Dubai, United Arab Emirates	For vacant IBF International cruiserweight title
16	Win	14–2	Perry Howe	PTS	6	30 Mar 2024	Ulster Hall, Belfast, Northern Ireland	
15	Loss	13–2	Kamshybek Kunkabayev	TD	7 (10), 1:05	11 Dec 2021	CSKA Sport Complex, Almaty, Kazakhstan	For vacant WBA Gold cruiserweight title
14	Win	13–1	Jone Volau	PTS	6	30 Sep 2020	Production Park Studios, South Kirkby, West Yorkshire, England	
13	Loss	12–1	Ričards Bolotņiks	TKO	1 (10), 2:21	14 Dec 2019	Brentwood Centre, Brentwood, Essex, England	Lost WBO European light-heavyweight title
12	Win	12–0	Liam Conroy	TD	8 (10)	21 Jun 2019	Ulster Hall, Belfast, Northern Ireland	Won vacant WBO European light-heavyweight title
11	Win	11–0	Abdullah Arabie	RTD	5 (6), 3:00	26 Apr 2019	York Hall, London, England	
10	Win	10–0	Josip Perkovic	PTS	8	29 Mar 2019	Ulster Hall, Belfast, Northern Ireland	
9	Win	9–0	Rolando Leonel Paredes Ramirez	DQ	9 (10), 2:08	5 Oct 2018	Titanic Exhibition Centre, Belfast, Northern Ireland	Paredes, after having one point deducted in the fourth round, was disqualified for repeated headbutts
8	Win	8–0	Steve Collins Jr.	PTS	8	18 Aug 2018	Windsor Park, Belfast, Northern Ireland	Won vacant BUI Celtic light-heavyweight title
7	Win	7–0	Michal Ciach	TKO	3 (6), 2:48	21 Apr 2018	SSE Arena, Belfast, Northern Ireland	
6	Win	6–0	Przemyslaw Binienda	PTS	6	18 Nov 2017	SSE Arena, Belfast, Northern Ireland	
5	Win	5–0	Attila Tibor Nagy	TKO	1 (6), 1:30	16 Sep 2017	Devenish Complex, Belfast, Northern Ireland	
4	Win	4–0	Istvan Orsos	TKO	4 (6), 3:00	17 Jun 2017	Waterfront Hall, Belfast, Northern Ireland	
3	Win	3–0	Curtis Gargano	PTS	4	10 Mar 2017	Waterfront Hall, Belfast, Northern Ireland	
2	Win	2–0	Remigijus Ziausys	PTS	4	3 Dec 2016	Hilton Hotel, Coventry, England	
1	Win	1–0	Merdjidin Yuseinov	PTS	4	15 Nov 2016	Titanic Exhibition Centre, Belfast, Northern Ireland	

== Exhibition boxing record ==
1 fight	0 wins	0 losses
Draws	1	

No.	Result	Record	Opponent	Type	Round, time	Date	Location	Notes
1	Draw	0–0–1	Hafþór Júlíus Björnsson	D	3	16 Jan 2021	Conrad Hotel, Dubai, U.A.E.	
