= Trinidad and Tobago at the 2010 Commonwealth Games =

- CGF code: TRI
- CGA: Trinidad and Tobago Olympic Committee
- Website: ttoc.org

in Delhi, India
- Medals Ranked 25th: Gold 0 Silver 4 Bronze 2 Total 6

Commonwealth Games appearances (overview)
- 1934; 1938; 1950; 1954; 1958; 1962; 1966; 1970; 1974; 1978; 1982; 1986; 1990; 1994; 1998; 2002; 2006; 2010; 2014; 2018; 2022; 2026; 2030

Trinidad and Tobago competed in the 2010 Commonwealth Games held in Delhi, India, from 3 to 14 October 2010.

== Medals ==
	(gold)	(silver)	(bronze)	Total
Trinidad and Tobago	0	4	2	6

== Medalists ==
Medal	Name	Sport	Event
Silver	Ayanna Alexander	Athletics	Women's Triple Jump
Silver	Cleopatra Brown	Athletics	Women's Shot Put
Silver	Roger Peter Daniel	Shooting	Men's 25 metre standard pistol
Silver	Tariq Abdul Haqq	Boxing	Super heavyweight
Bronze	Aaron Armstrong	Athletics	Men's 100m
Bronze	Rhodney Richard Allen and Roger Peter Daniel	Shooting	Men's 50 metre pistol (pairs)

== See also ==
- 2010 Commonwealth Games
