= Shane Crawford (militant) =

Shane Crawford (1984/85 – February 2017), also known as Abu Sa’d at-Trinidadi or Abu Sa’d al-Trinidadi, was an Islamic State militant from Trinidad and Tobago. He was killed in 2017.

== Early life ==
Crawford was raised in Enterprise, Chaguanas in 1984 or 1985 (Note: In Black Flags of the Caribbean Simon Cottee notes that Crawford would have been "just five years old" at the time of the Jamaat al Muslimeen coup attempt in July 1990) the youngest of Joan Crawford's six children. He was raised a Spiritual Baptist, but converted to Islam when he was 20. After leaving school he worked as a labourer, taxi driver and worked as a fish vendor.

In September 2011 Crawford was arrested and charged with possession of a firearm, ammunition, an army uniform and a bullet-proof vest. In November 2011 he was arrested along with 15 others in connection with an alleged plot to assassinate Prime Minister Kamla Persad-Bissessar and other senior government officials. After 14 days, all were released without charge. In November 2013 Crawford, together with Milton Algernon and Stuart Mohamed, murdered Joel Malchan and Dharmendra Sookdeo in Chaguanas.

== Career in the Islamic State ==
Crawford left Trinidad and Tobago in 2013 after the murder of Malchan and Sookdeo. He travelled to Venezuela with his wife Jamelia Luqman where the met up with Algernon and Mohamed, and the four travelled to Syria. These four were the first group of Trinidad and Tobago militants to join the Islamic State.

Crawford appeared in the July 2016 issue of the Islamic State's magazine, Dabiq, where he called for Muslims in Trinidad and Tobago to "terrify the disbelievers in their own homes and make their streets run with their blood". A few weeks later he was seriously injured in a United States drone strike, and died of his injuries in February 2017.

== See also ==
- Trinidad and Tobago and the Islamic State
