= Mark Montgomery (entrepreneur) =

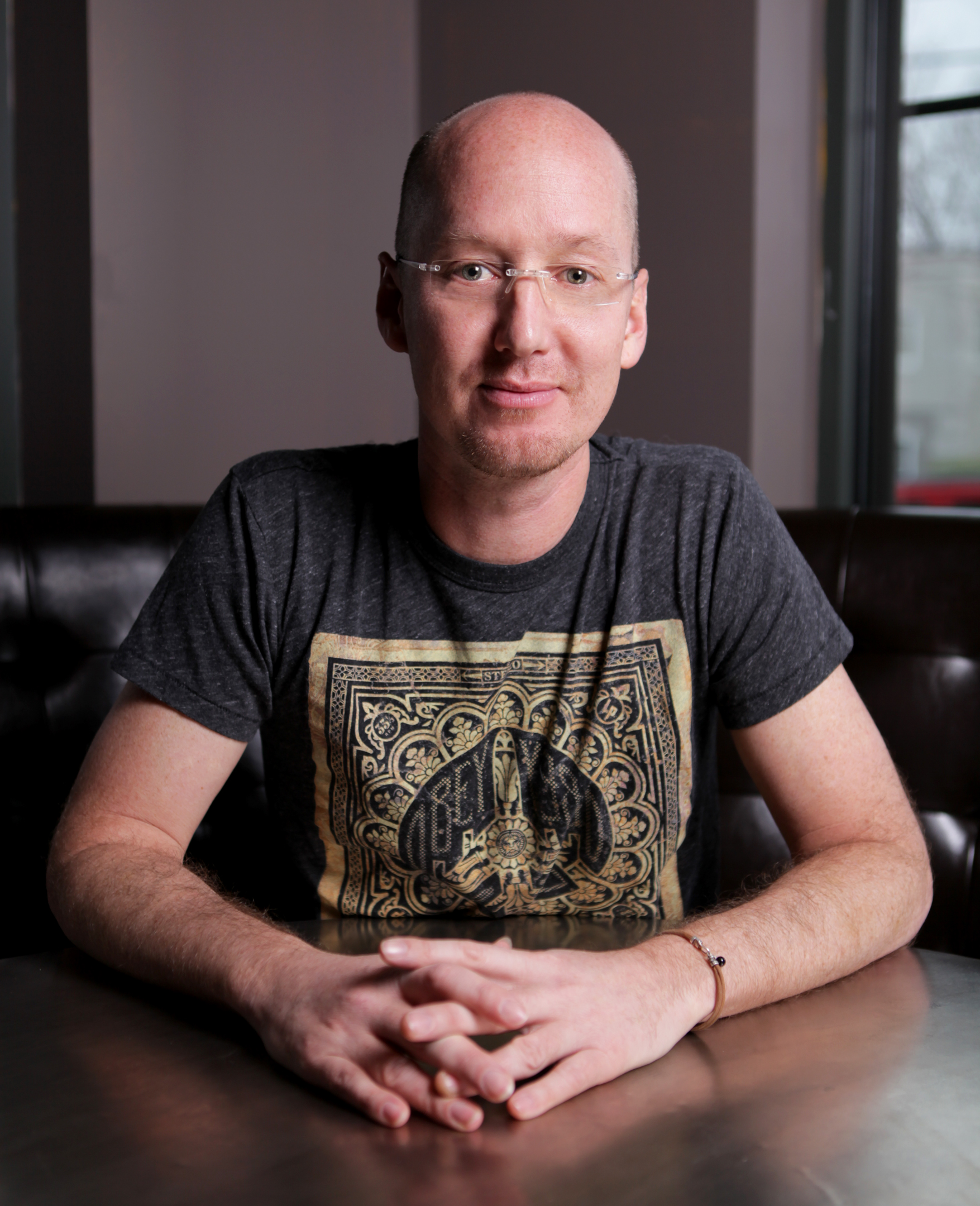
Mark Anthony Montgomery

Mark Anthony Montgomery (born June 16, 1967) is an American entrepreneur best known for co-founding echomusic, which was sold to Ticketmaster/IAC in March 2007 for $25MM.

After selling echomusic, Montgomery went on to serve as Entrepreneur in Residence at Claritas Capital, sat on the Founding Board of the Nashville Entrepreneur Center, founded flo{thinkery}, launched Blue Chair Bay Rum.

== Career ==
In 1999, Montgomery and Neil Einstman, one of his partners in ChelseaMusic, formed echomusic, LLC, a digital marketing and distribution company which aimed to facilitate direct communication between artists and fans. Clients included Kelly Clarkson, Keith Urban, Rascal Flatts, Casting Crowns, the Academy of Country Music, and the Gospel Music Channel.

In 2007, echo attracted the attention of IAC/Ticketmaster, which purchased a majority interest in echo. Montgomery left echo in 2009 to pursue other ventures.

Montgomery was awarded the Nashville Business Journal's Entrepreneur of the Year in 2007.

In the fall of 2013, Montgomery partnered up with Middle Tennessee State University's Music Business Department to teach a class revolving around the "New Music Business" and the marriage of music and technology. Montgomery arranged for the students to receive mentorship through The Nashville Entrepreneurship Center, where Montgomery is a current member on the board of directors.

== Personal life ==
Montgomery resides just outside of Nashville with his daughter and fiancé.
