= Stephen Simmons (boxer) =

Scottish boxer (born 1984)

Personal information
- Nickname: Simbo Monster
- Born: 6 August 1984 (age 42) Edinburgh, Scotland
- Weight: Cruiserweight

Boxing career
- Stance: Orthodox

Boxing record
- Total fights: 21
- Wins: 18
- Win by KO: 7
- Losses: 3
- No contests: 0
Medal record
Men's Boxing
Representing Scotland
Commonwealth Games
Bronze medal – third place	2010 Delhi	Heavyweight
Commonwealth Championships
Silver medal – second place	2005 Glasgow	Heavyweight
Silver medal – second place	2007 Liverpool	Heavyweight
Bronze medal – third place	2010 Delhi	Heavyweight

Stephen Simmons (born 6 August 1984) is a Scottish former professional boxer who competed from 2011 to 2018. He held multiple cruiserweight championships; and challenged once for the British title in 2018.

== Amateur career ==
Stephen Simmons started boxing aged 12 and fought his entire Amateur Career out of renowned Scottish Amateur Boxing Club Leith Victoria AAC, being coached by his Uncle Kenny who boxed for Scotland at Middleweight. He won numerous trophies throughout Europe since 2004, having around 115 Amateur contests winning approximately 80 of them. Simmons competed in the 2010 Commonwealth Games held in Delhi, winning the bronze medal in the 91 kg Heavyweight Division.

== Professional career ==
He is currently trained by Billy Nelson. Simmons is managed by MTK Global (Mathew Macklin).

According to Boxrec, in October 2016, Simmons was ranked 5th in the UK and 46th in the World at Cruiserweight level.

On 27 June 2016, Simmons battled against Noel Gevor in Hamburg, Germany. Simmons was aggressive throughout the fight, while Gevor boxed well, but neither fighter looked like they did enough to win the rounds by a clear margin. In the end, it was a very close fight, and the judges scored it 116-112 twice for Gevor, and 116–113, awarding Gevor the split-decision win.

On 17 March 2018, Simmons fought Matty Askin for the vacant British cruiserweight belt. Simmons was outmatched by Askin, losing the fight in the second round via TKO.

In April 2018, Simmons announced that he is retiring from the sport of boxing.

== Personal life ==
Simmons married his fiancée Nicole on 1 June 2014. They live in Edinburgh and they have 3 children.

== Professional boxing record ==
21 fights	18 wins	3 losses
By knockout	7	2
By decision	10	1
By disqualification	1	0

No.	Result	Record	Opponent	Type	Round, time	Date	Location	Notes
21	Loss	18–3	Matty Askin	TKO	2 (12), 1:53	17 Mar 2018	York Hall, London, England	For British cruiserweight title
20	Win	18–2	Simon Barclay	UD	12	6 Oct 2017	Meadowbank Sports Centre, Edinburgh, Scotland	Won vacant IBF European cruiserweight title
19	Win	17–2	Lukasz Rusiewicz	DQ	6 (6), 0:35	8 Jul 2017	Braehead Arena, Glasgow, Scotland	Rusiewicz disqualified for persistent fouling
18	Win	16–2	Arturs Kulikauskis	PTS	6	19 May 2017	Crowne Plaza Hotel, Glasgow, Scotland	
17	Loss	15–2	Norair Mikaeljan	SD	12	14 Oct 2016	Inselpark Arena, Hamburg, Germany	For WBO International cruiserweight title
16	Win	15–1	Lars Buchholz	RTD	3 (10), 3:00	1 Oct 2016	Bellahouston Leisure Centre, Glasgow, Scotland	
15	Win	14–1	Remigijus Ziausys	PTS	6	28 Jan 2016	Crowne Plaza Hotel, Glasgow, Scotland	
14	Win	13–1	Imantas Davidaitis	TKO	5 (6), 1:03	5 Dec 2015	Meadowbank Sports Centre, Edinburgh, Scotland	
13	Win	12–1	Jiri Svacina	PTS	8	5 Sep 2015	Meadowbank Sports Centre, Edinburgh, Scotland	
12	Loss	11–1	Jon-Lewis Dickinson	TKO	8 (10), 2:15	4 Apr 2015	Metro Radio Arena, Newcastle, England	Lost WBC International Silver cruiserweight title
11	Win	11–0	Courtney Richards	PTS	6	4 Oct 2014	First Direct Arena, Leeds, England	
10	Win	10–0	Wadi Camacho	TKO	10 (10), 1:01	27 Jun 2014	Braehead Arena, Glasgow, Scotland	Retained WBC International Silver cruiserweight title
9	Win	9–0	David Graf	UD	10	7 Sep 2013	Exhibition and Conference Centre, Glasgow, Scotland	Won vacant WBC International Silver cruiserweight title
8	Win	8–0	Michael Sweeney	RTD	3 (10), 3:00	11 May 2013	Emirates Arena, Glasgow, Scotland	Won vacant Celtic cruiserweight title
7	Win	7–0	Jovan Kaludjerovic	KO	2 (6), 2:38	12 Jul 2014	Gorbals Leisure Centre, Glasgow, Scotland	
6	Win	6–0	Tayar Mehmed	PTS	6	22 Sep 2012	Exhibition and Conference Centre, Glasgow, Scotland	
5	Win	5–0	Jevgenijs Andrejevs	PTS	6	29 Jun 2012	Kelvin Hall, Glasgow, Scotland	
4	Win	4–0	Hastings Rasani	TKO	6 (6), 2:29	1 Feb 2014	Braehead Arena, Glasgow, Scotland	
3	Win	3–0	John Anthony	PTS	6	25 Nov 2011	Ravenscraig Regional Sports Facility, Motherwell, Scotland	
2	Win	2–0	Hari Miles	PTS	4	21 May 2011	The O2 Arena, London, England	
1	Win	1–0	Nick Okoth	TKO	2 (4), 1:36	12 Mar 2011	Braehead Arena, Glasgow, Scotland	
