= Mark Montgomery (wrestler) =

Irish wrestler

Mark Montgomery (born 25 February 1974) is a Northern Irish sportsman who represented Northern Ireland at the 2010 Commonwealth Games in Delhi in Freestyle Wrestling and Greco Roman Wrestling finishing in 5th Place in both disciplines. He was born in Belfast and resides in the City of Lisburn. At the 2010 Games Montgomery was the flag bearer at the opening ceremony and was a GB Senior Representative in Wrestling. Montgomery also represented Northern Ireland in the 2002 and 2014 Commonwealth Games in Manchester and Glasgow in Judo finishing in 5th place in Manchester. Also representing GB in Judo, Montgomery became the British, Commonwealth & European Masters Champion and World Bronze Medallist. Montgomery retired from senior international competition in 2014 after a senior career spanning 26 years, but continues to coach at local and national level.
