= Conrad Dubai =

Hotel in Dubai, United Arab Emirates

- Location within Dubai

General information
- Type: Hotel
- Architectural style: Modernism
- Location: 20 Sheikh Zayed Road; Dubai, United Arab Emirates
- Construction started: 2008
- Completed: 2013
- Owner: Hilton Worldwide

Height
- Roof: 255 m (837 ft)

Technical details
- Floor count: 51; 3 below ground
- Lifts/elevators: 29

Design and construction
- Architects: WS Atkins & Partners

Other information
- Number of rooms: 555

Website
- Official website

Conrad Dubai is a 51-storey luxury hotel in the United Arab Emirates. Located in Dubai's commercial center on Sheikh Zayed Road, the property is close to the Dubai International Financial Centre and the Dubai Mall. The hotel was officially opened on 18 September 2013.

Conrad Dubai hotel has three food and beverage venues: Ballaro, Bliss 6, Cave, Anâsa, Isla, and Kimpo.

== See also ==
- Hotels in Dubai
- Hilton Hotels & Resorts
- Conrad Hotels
