= Dilbag Singh =

Indian boxer

Personal information
- Full name: Dilbag Singh
- Born: 2 October 1981 (age 44) India
- Height: 5 ft 7 in (1.70 m)
- Weight: 152 lb (69 kg)
Medal record
Men's boxing
Representing India
Bronze medal – third place	2010 Commonwealth Games	Welterweight

Dilbag Singh (born 4 September 1981) Dilbag Singh is an Indian boxer.

== Amateur boxing career ==
Singh won the bronze medal in the 2010 Commonwealth Games in the Welterweight category.

Date	Championships Name	Venue	Medal
2009-03-11	1st A. K. Misra International Boxing Tournament	Chandigarh	Gold
2009-10-26	56th Senior National Boxing Championship at Hyderabad	Andhra Pradesh	Gold
2010-03-10	2010 Commonwealth Games	New Delhi, India	Bronze
2010-07-10	Sahara 57th Senior National Boxing Championship	New Delhi, India	Gold
2011-02-12	34th National Games (Men Boxing)	Jharkhand	Gold
2012-10-30	Sahara 59th Senior Men National Boxing Championships	Hyderabad, Andhra Pradesh	Gold
2013	International Boxing Tournament "Konstantin Korotkov Memorial"	Khabarovsk, Russia	Silver

== Professional boxing career ==
Singh turned professional in 2015.

Date	Opponent	Location	Result
2015-11-04	Yan Jin	Wanda Plaza, Kunming, China	Won TKO 3rd rounds
2015-10-04	Rocky Alap Alap	Sunhak Gymnasium, Incheon, South Korea	Won TKO 2nd round
2015-05-30	Clinton Smith	Select Citywalk Saket, New Delhi, India	Won TKO 4th round

== Controversies ==
Singh was accused of allegedly manipulation the trials for the World Championship. Singh also failed a dope test, he had tested positive for methylhexaneamine after winning gold in the Jharkhand National Games 2011.
