= Tariq Abdul Haqq =

Tariq Abdul Haqq (1990 – 2015) was a Trinidad and Tobago athlete and Islamic State militant. A boxer and martial artist, he won a silver medal in boxing at the 2010 Commonwealth Games. He trained as a lawyer before travelling to Syria with his wife and sister in 2014 to join the Islamic State.

== Early life and education ==
Abdul Haqq was the son of boxing coach and gym owner Yaqub Abdul Haqq, and nephew of Pamela Elder, a prominent lawyer. He was educated at Saint Mary's College in Port of Spain, where he completed his A Levels and competed in boxing and martial arts.

Abdul Haqq graduated from the University of London, and completed law school before travelling to Syria in 2014.

== Boxing career ==
In 2005 Abdul Haqq was the National Junior Amateur Middleweight Boxing champion. In 2006 and 2007 he was the National Under-17 Light Heavyweight Boxing Champion, and in 2006 he was the Caribbean Under-17 Light Heavyweight Boxing Champion. He represented Trinidad and Tobago at the 2010 Central American and Caribbean Games where he earned a bronze medal in the super heavyweight class.

Abdul Haqq represented Trinidad and Tobago at the 2010 Commonwealth Games in Delhi, where he earned a silver medal in super heavyweight boxing. After beating Pakistani boxer Meer Khan 10-1 and New Zealander Joseph Parker 7-7, he defeated Cameroonian Blaise Yepmou to advance to the final where the lost 5–1 to Paramjeet Samota of India.

After the Commonwealth Games, Abdul Haqq found himself at odds with the Trinidad and Tobago Boxing Board of Control over compensation for medical expenses, and ruled himself out of contention for the 2012 Summer Olympics.

== Career in the Islamic State ==
Abdul Haqq's father, Yaqub, died of an accidentally self-inflicted gunshot wound in May 2013. After his father's death, Abdul Haqq "made this big turnaround", according to his sister Aliya, and decided to move to Syria. He travelled to Syria in November 2014 with his wife, Abbey Greene, a Barbadian citizen, his sister Aliya, and her husband Osyaba Muhammad.

Abdul Haqq met German journalist Jürgen Todenhöfer in Syria. When asked why he was there, he said "I'm here to do whatever the caliph is asking". He was later injured in a bombing raid, and lost one of his hands. Abdul Haqq was killed after less than six months in the territory of the Islamic State. His brother-in-law Osyaba Muhammad was killed in Syria in 2014 and Aliya's second husband, Chris Lewis (another militant from Trinidad and Tobago) was killed in August 2016 in a United States bombing raid against the ISIS compound where he was stationed. Greene and Aliya Abdul Haqq survived the Battle of Baghuz Fawqani in 2019 and appeared on the Popular Front podcast in 2020.

== See also ==
- Trinidad and Tobago and the Islamic State
