= Paddy Gallagher (boxer) =

Irish boxer

Personal information
- Nickname: 'Pat-Man'
- Born: Patrick Gallagher; 9 April 1989 (age 37) Belfast, Northern Ireland
- Weight: Welterweight; Light-middleweight

Boxing career
- Stance: Orthodox

Boxing record
- Total fights: 22
- Wins: 16
- Win by KO: 10
- Losses: 6
Medal record
Men's amateur boxing
Representing Northern Ireland
Commonwealth Games
Gold medal – first place	2010 Delhi	Welterweight

Patrick Gallagher (born 9 April 1989) is a professional boxer who challenged once for the British, and Commonwealth welterweight titles in 2019. As an amateur he won gold at the 2010 Commonwealth Games.

== Amateur awards ==
- 2009 Irish Amateur Boxing Association Best U21
- Irish under 21 light welterweight champion
- Irish Intermediate champ
- Ulster Elite runner up

== Amateur career ==
=== 2010 Commonwealth Games ===
Gallagher represented Northern Ireland in the Delhi Commonwealth Games in the welterweight division. He won the gold medal, defeating England's Callum Smith 11–6 in the final.

- 6 October 2010 Qualification Bout 56 – defeated Joseph Mulema Cameroon 3–0
- 8 Oct 2010 1/8 Eliminations Bout 107 – defeated Suruz Bangali Bangladesh9–0
- 10 Oct 2010 Quarterfinals Bout 168 – defeated Mujandjae Kasuto Namibia 7–5
- 11 Oct 2010 Semifinals Bout 197 – defeated Dilbag Singh India 5–4
- 13 Oct 2010 Finals Gold Medal Bout 213 – defeated Callum Smith England 11–6

=== 2011–2012 World Series of Boxing ===
Gallagher boxed for the Mumbai Fighters during the 2011 WSB season. He finished up with a record of 1–1.

- Week 1 – defeated by Sergiy Derevyanchenko Ukraine TKO
- Week 4 – defeated Russell Lamour Haiti (48:47, 48:47, 47:48)

== Professional career ==
=== Professional contract ===
On 22 May 2012 Gallagher signed his professional contract with John Rooney, deciding to keep his base in Belfast.

== Professional boxing record ==
22 fights	16 wins	6 losses
By knockout	10	0
By decision	6	6

No.	Result	Record	Opponent	Type	Round, time	Date	Location	Notes
7	Loss	5–2	(United Kingdom) Johnny Coyle	UD	3	5 Apr 2014	(United Kingdom) York Hall, London, England	Prizefighter: The Welterweights IV – Final
6	Win	5–1	(United Kingdom) Mark Douglas	TKO	1 (3)	5 Apr 2014	(United Kingdom) York Hall, London, England	Prizefighter: The Welterweights IV – Semi-final
5	Loss	4–1	(United Kingdom) Erick Ochieng	UD	3	5 Apr 2014	(United Kingdom) York Hall, London, England	Prizefighter: The Welterweights IV – Quarter-final
4	Win	4–0	(Lithuania) Aleksas Vaseris	TKO	1 (4)	18 Nov 2013	(United Kingdom) Park Plaza Hotel, London, England	
3	Win	3–0	(Hungary) Jozsef Garai	TKO	1 (4)	14 Sep 2013	(United Kingdom) The Devenish, North Finaghy Roady, Belfast, Northern Ireland	
2	Win	2–0	(United Kingdom) Andrew Patterson	TKO	1 (4)	26 Nov 2012	(United Kingdom) Royal Lancaster Hotel, London, England	
1	Win	1–0	(United Kingdom) William Warburton	UD	4	22 Sep 2012	(United Kingdom) Odyssey Arena, Belfast, Northern Ireland	
