= Awusone Yekeni =

Ghanaian boxer

Medal record

Representing Ghana

Men's Boxing

Commonwealth Games
Bronze medal – third place	2006 Melbourne	Heavyweight
Bronze medal – third place	2010 Delhi	Heavyweight

Awusone Yekeni (born 23 June 1983) is a Ghanaian amateur boxer best known for winning a bronze medal at the 2006 Commonwealth Games at the heavyweight 201 lbs limit.

== Career ==
He upset favorite Emmanuel Izonritei in his first bout and beat Scot Steven Simmons before losing the semifinal to local favorite and eventual winner Bradley Michael Pitt in 13:25.

At the Olympic qualifiers he lost to Mohamed Arjaoui and Durodola Olanrewaju and failed in his bid.
