= England at the 2010 Commonwealth Games (medalists) =

- CG code: ENG
- CGA: Commonwealth Games England
- Website: weareengland.org

in Delhi, India
- Competitors: 364 in 17 sports
- Flag bearers: Opening: Nathan Robertson; Closing: Nicky Hunt
- Medals Ranked 2nd: Gold 38 Silver 58 Bronze 46 Total 142

Commonwealth Games appearances (overview)
- 1930; 1934; 1938; 1950; 1954; 1958; 1962; 1966; 1970; 1974; 1978; 1982; 1986; 1990; 1994; 1998; 2002; 2006; 2010; 2014; 2018; 2022; 2026; 2030

England was represented at the 2010 Commonwealth Games by Commonwealth Games England. The country went by the abbreviation ENG, will use the Cross of St George as its flag and "Jerusalem" as its victory anthem. It had previously used "Land of Hope and Glory" as its anthem at the Commonwealth Games, but decided to change following an "internet poll".

England's delegation is notable for including two Paralympic champions, who qualified to compete in Delhi against fully able-bodied athletes: Danielle Brown, who won a gold medal in archery at the 2008 Summer Paralympics, and Sarah Storey, who won two gold medals in cycling in 2008. They are the first English athletes with disabilities ever to compete in able-bodied events at the Commonwealth Games.

== Gold Medalists ==
Medal	Name	Sport	Event	Date
Gold	Liam Tancock	Aquatics	Men's 50 m backstroke	5 October
Gold	Francesca Halsall	Aquatics	Women's 50 m butterfly	5 October
Gold	Myroslav Dykun	Wrestling	Men's Greco-Roman 66 kg	6 October
Gold	Luke Folwell	Gymnastics	Men's artistic individual all-around	6 October
Gold	Steven Scott & Stevan Walton	Shooting	Men's double trap pairs	6 October
Gold	James Goddard	Aquatics	Men's 200 m backstroke	6 October
Gold	Rebecca Adlington	Aquatics	Women's 800 m freestyle	7 October
Gold	England; Danielle Brown, Nicky Hunt & Nichola Simpson	Archery	Women's compound team	7 October
Gold	England; Duncan Busby, Liam Grimwood & Christopher White	Archery	Men's compound team	7 October
Gold	Imogen Cairns	Gymnastics	Women's vault	7 October
Gold	Stevan Walton	Shooting	Men's double trap singles	7 October
Gold	Katrina Hart	Athletics	Women's 100 m (T37)	7 October
Gold	Liam Tancock	Aquatics	Men's 100 m backstroke	8 October
Gold	Rebecca Adlington	Aquatics	Women's 400 m freestyle	8 October
Gold	James Goddard	Aquatics	Men's 200 m individual medley	8 October
Gold	Andy Turner	Athletics	Men's 110 m hurdles	8 October
Gold	Luke Folwell	Gymnastics	Men's vault	8 October
Gold	Imogen Cairns	Gymnastics	Women's floor	8 October
Gold	Nick Matthew	Squash	Men's singles	8 October
Gold	Jo Jackson	Athletics	Women's 20 km race walk	8 October
Gold	Anita North	Shooting	Women's trap singles	9 October
Gold	Louise Hazel	Athletics	Women's heptathlon	9 October
Gold	Leon Baptiste	Athletics	Men's 200 m	10 October
Gold	Aaron Heading	Shooting	Men's trap singles	10 October
Gold	Ellen Falkner, Amy Monkhouse	Lawn bowls	Women's pairs	11 October
Gold	Bradley Saunders	Boxing	Men's Light Welterweight 64 kg	13 October

== Silver Medalists ==
Medal	Name	Sport	Event	Date
Silver	Michael Rock	Aquatics	Men's 200 m butterfly	4 October
Silver	England; Adam Brown, Simon Burnett, Ross Davenport, Liam Tancock & Grant Turner	Aquatics	Men's 4 × 100 m freestyle	4 October
Silver	England; Reiss Beckford, Tariq Dowers, Steve Jehu, Danny Lawrence & Max Whitlock	Gymnastics	Men's artistic team all-around	4 October
Silver	England; Imogen Cairns, Laura Edwards, Jocelyn Hunt & Charlotte Lindsley	Gymnastics	Women's artistic team all-around	5 October
Silver	James Huckle & Kenny Parr	Shooting	Men's 10 m air rifle pairs	5 October
Silver	Terence Bosson	Wrestling	Men's Greco-Roman 60 kg	5 October
Silver	Gemma Spofforth	Aquatics	Women's 100 m backstroke	6 October
Silver	David Daniell	Cycling	Men's Keirin	6 October
Silver	George Atkins	Cycling	Men's points race	6 October
Silver	Reiss Beckford	Gymnastics	Men's artistic individual all-around	6 October
Silver	Simon Miller	Aquatics	Men's 50 m freestyle S9	6 October
Silver	Ellen Gandy	Aquatics	Women's 100 m butterfly	7 October
Silver	Simon Burnett	Aquatics	Men's 100 m freestyle	7 October
Silver	Joseph Roebuck	Aquatics	Men's 400 m individual medley	7 October
Silver	Jenna Randall	Aquatics	Women's solo	7 October
Silver	Olivia Allison & Jenna Randall	Aquatics	Women's duet	7 October
Silver	Mark Lewis-Francis	Athletics	Men's 100 m	7 October
Silver	Reiss Beckford	Gymnastics	Men's floor	7 October
Silver	Max Whitlock	Gymnastics	Men's pommel horse	7 October
Silver	Luke Folwell	Gymnastics	Men's rings	7 October
Silver	Nick Baxter & Mick Gault	Shooting	Men's 10 m air pistol pairs	7 October
Silver	Stephanie Millward	Aquatics	Women's 100 m freestyle S9	7 October
Silver	Dan West	Athletics	Men's shot put (F32/34/52)	7 October
Silver	Antony James	Aquatics	Men's 100 m butterfly	8 October
Silver	Francesca Halsall	Aquatics	Women's 50 m freestyle	8 October
Silver	Elizabeth Simmonds	Aquatics	Women's 200 m backstroke	8 October
Silver	Gemma Spofforth	Aquatics	Women's 50 m backstroke	8 October
Silver	Joseph Roebuck	Aquatics	Men's 200 m individual medley	8 October
Silver		Aquatics	Women's 4 × 100 m freestyle	8 October
Silver	England	Archery	Women's recurve team	8 October
Silver	William Sharman	Athletics	Men's 110 m hurdles	8 October
Silver	Alex Smith	Athletics	Men's hammer throw	8 October
Silver	Luke Folwell	Gymnastics	Men's parallel bars	8 October
Silver		Shooting	Women's trap pairs	8 October
Silver		Shooting	Men's 50 m rifle 3 positions pairs	8 October
Silver	James Willstrop	Squash	Men's singles	8 October
Silver	Jenny Duncalf	Squash	Women's singles	8 October
Silver		Aquatics	Women's 4 × 100 m medley	9 October
Silver	Christopher White	Archery	Men's compound individual	9 October
Silver	Greg Rutherford	Athletics	Men's long jump	9 October
Silver		Table tennis	Men's team	9 October
Silver		Table tennis	Men's doubles	9 October
Silver	Stephanie Millward	Aquatics	Women's 100 m butterfly S9	9 October
Silver	Alison Williamson	Archery	Women's individual recurve	10 October
Silver	Elizabeth Armitstead	Cycling	Women's road race	10 October
Silver	Steven Lewis	Athletics	Men's pole vault	11 October
Silver	England	Lawn bowls	Men's pairs	11 October
Silver	England	Shooting	Women's 50 m rifle prone pairs	11 October
Silver	Steven Lewis	Athletics	Women's 200 m	11 October
Silver	Alex Dowsett	Cycling	Men's time trial	13 October

== Bronze Medalists ==
Medal	Name	Sport	Event	Date
Bronze	Rebecca Adlington	Aquatics	Women's 200 m freestyle	5 October
Bronze	Gorgs Geikie & Julia Lydall	Shooting	Women's 25 m pistol pairs	5 October
Bronze	Kate Haywood	Aquatics	Women's 50 m breaststroke	5 October
Bronze	Stephanie Millward	Aquatics	Women's 50 m freestyle S9	5 October
Bronze	Francesca Halsall	Aquatics	Women's 100 m freestyle	6 October
Bronze	James Huckle	Shooting	Men's 10 m air rifle singles	6 October
Bronze	Zoe Smith	Weightlifting	Women's 58 kg	6 October
Bronze	Gemma Prescott	Athletics	Women's shot put (F32–34/52/53)	6 October
Bronze	England	Aquatics	Women's 4 × 200 m freestyle relay	6 October
Bronze	Katherine Endacott	Athletics	Women's 100 m	7 October
Bronze	Anna Blyth	Cycling	Women's 10 km scratch race	7 October
Bronze	Zoe Derham	Athletics	Women's hammer throw	7 October
Bronze	Lawrence Clark	Athletics	Men's 110 m hurdles	8 October
Bronze	Kate Haywood	Aquatics	Women's 100 m breaststroke	8 October
Bronze	Mike Floyd	Athletics	Men's hammer throw	8 October
Bronze	Martin Brockman	Athletics	Men's decathlon	8 October
Bronze		Badminton	Mixed team	8 October
Bronze	Max Whitlock	Gymnastics	Men's horizontal bar	8 October
Bronze	England	Shooting	Men's trap pairs	8 October
Bronze	Peter Barker	Squash	Men's singles	8 October
Bronze	Ellen Gandy	Aquatics	Women's 200 m butterfly	9 October
Bronze	KeriAnne Payne	Aquatics	Women's 400 m individual medley	9 October
Bronze	Daniel Fogg	Aquatics	Men's 1500 m freestyle	9 October
Bronze		Aquatics	Men's 4 × 100 m medley	9 October
Bronze	James Huckle	Shooting	Men's 50 m rifles 3 position singles	9 October
Bronze	Sasha Madyarchyk	Wrestling	Men's freestyle 60 kg	9 October
Bronze	Leon Rattigan	Wrestling	Men's freestyle 96 kg	9 October
Bronze	Robert Welbourn	Aquatics	Men's 100 m freestyle S10	9 October
Bronze	Grace Clements	Athletics	Women's heptathlon	9 October
Bronze	Carl Myerscough	Athletics	Men's discus throw	10 October
Bronze		Lawn bowls	Women's triples	10 October
Bronze		Lawn bowls	Men's triples	10 October
Bronze		Tennis	Mixed doubles	10 October
Bronze	England	Shooting	Men's skeet pairs	11 October

Medals by sport
Sport	gold	silver	bronze	Total
Aquatics	9	18	11	38
Gymnastics	4	7	2	13
Athletics	7	8	11	26
Shooting	6	5	5	16
Archery	4	3	0	7
Squash	2	3	1	6
Wrestling	1	1	2	4
Cycling	0	4	2	6
Badminton	0	3	2	5
Weightlifting	0	0	1	1
Boxing	3	2	0	5
Hockey	0	0	1	1
Lawn bowls	2	1	2	5
Netball	0	0	1	1
Rugby sevens	0	0	0	0
Table tennis	0	1	2	3
Tennis	0	1	1	2
Total	38	58	46	142

== See also ==
- England at the Commonwealth Games
- England at the 2006 Commonwealth Games
