= England at the 2010 Commonwealth Games =

- CG code: ENG
- CGA: Commonwealth Games England
- Website: weareengland.org

in Delhi, India
- Competitors: 364 in 17 sports
- Flag bearers: Opening: Nathan Robertson; Closing: Nicky Hunt
- Medals Ranked 3rd: Gold 37 Silver 60 Bronze 45 Total 142

Commonwealth Games appearances (overview)
- 1930; 1934; 1938; 1950; 1954; 1958; 1962; 1966; 1970; 1974; 1978; 1982; 1986; 1990; 1994; 1998; 2002; 2006; 2010; 2014; 2018; 2022; 2026; 2030

England competed at the 2010 Commonwealth Games and were represented by Commonwealth Games England. The country used: the abbreviation ENG, the Cross of St George as its flag and "Jerusalem" as its victory anthem. England had previously used "Land of Hope and Glory" as its anthem at the Commonwealth Games, but decided to change following an "internet poll".

England's delegation is notable for including two Paralympic champions, who qualified to compete in Delhi against fully able-bodied athletes: Danielle Brown, who won a gold medal in archery at the 2008 Summer Paralympics, and Sarah Storey, who won two gold medals in cycling in 2008. They are the first English athletes with disabilities ever to compete in able-bodied events at the Commonwealth Games.

England finished third in the medal table behind Australia and India with 37 gold medals, 60 silver medals and 45 bronze medals.

== Medal table (top three) ==
Rank	Nation	Gold	Silver	Bronze	Total
1	Australia	74	55	48	177
2	India	38	27	36	101
3	England	37	60	45	142
Totals (3 entries)		149	142	129	420

== Medallists ==
Medal	Name	Sport	Event	Date
Gold	Liam Tancock	Aquatics	Men's 50 m backstroke	5 October
Gold	Francesca Halsall	Aquatics	Women's 50 m butterfly	5 October
Gold	Myroslav Dykun	Wrestling	Men's Greco-Roman 66 kg	6 October
Gold	Luke Folwell	Gymnastics	Men's artistic individual all-around	6 October
Gold	Steven Scott; Stevan Walton	Shooting	Men's double trap pairs	6 October
Gold	James Goddard	Aquatics	Men's 200 m backstroke	6 October
Gold	Rebecca Adlington	Aquatics	Women's 800 m freestyle	7 October
Gold	England; Danielle Brown; Nicky Hunt; Nichola Simpson	Archery	Women's compound team	7 October
Gold	England; Duncan Busby; Liam Grimwood; Christopher White	Archery	Men's compound team	7 October
Gold	Imogen Cairns	Gymnastics	Women's vault	7 October
Gold	Stevan Walton	Shooting	Men's double trap singles	7 October
Gold	Katrina Hart	Athletics	Women's 100 m (T37)	7 October
Gold	Liam Tancock	Aquatics	Men's 100 m backstroke	8 October
Gold	Rebecca Adlington	Aquatics	Women's 400 m freestyle	8 October
Gold	James Goddard	Aquatics	Men's 200 m individual medley	8 October
Gold	Andy Turner	Athletics	Men's 110 m hurdles	8 October
Gold	Luke Folwell	Gymnastics	Men's vault	8 October
Gold	Imogen Cairns	Gymnastics	Women's floor	8 October
Gold	Nick Matthew	Squash	Men's singles	8 October
Gold	Jo Jackson	Athletics	Women's 20 km race walk	9 October
Gold	Anita North	Shooting	Women's trap singles	9 October
Gold	Louise Hazel	Athletics	Women's heptathlon	9 October
Gold	Nicky Hunt	Archery	Women's compound individual	9 October
Gold	Duncan Busby	Archery	Men's compound individual	9 October
Gold	Leon Baptiste	Athletics	Men's 200 m	10 October
Gold	Aaron Heading	Shooting	Men's trap singles	10 October
Gold	Ellen Falkner; Amy Monkhouse	Lawn bowls	Women's pairs	11 October
Gold	Max Brick; Tom Daley	Aquatics	Men's 10 m synchro platform	12 October
Gold	Katherine Endacott; Montell Douglas; Laura Turner; Abiodun Oyepitan	Athletics	Women's 4 × 100 metres relay	12 October
Gold	Ryan Scott; Leon Baptiste; Marlon Devonish; Mark Lewis-Francis	Athletics	Men's 4 × 100 metres relay	12 October
Gold	Tom Daley	Aquatics	Men's 10 m platform	13 October
Gold	Thomas Stalker	Boxing	Men's Lightweight 60 kg	13 October
Gold	Simon Vallily	Boxing	Men's Heavyweight 91 kg	13 October
Gold	Natalie Melmore	Lawn bowls	Women's singles	13 October
Gold	Richard Brickell	Shooting	Men's skeet singles	13 October
Gold	Parag Patel	Shooting	Men's full bore rifle open singles	13 October
Gold	Adrian Grant; Nick Matthew	Squash	Men's doubles	13 October
Silver	Michael Rock	Aquatics	Men's 200 m butterfly	4 October
Silver	England; Adam Brown; Simon Burnett; Ross Davenport; Liam Tancock; Grant Turner	Aquatics	Men's 4 × 100 m freestyle	4 October
Silver	England; Reiss Beckford; Tariq Dowers; Steve Jehu; Danny Lawrence; Max Whitlock	Gymnastics	Men's artistic team all-around	4 October
Silver	England; Imogen Cairns; Laura Edwards; Jocelyn Hunt; Charlotte Lindsley	Gymnastics	Women's artistic team all-around	5 October
Silver	James Huckle; Kenneth Parr	Shooting	Men's 10 m air rifle pairs	5 October
Silver	Terence Bosson	Wrestling	Men's Greco-Roman 60 kg	5 October
Silver	Gemma Spofforth	Aquatics	Women's 100 m backstroke	6 October
Silver	David Daniell	Cycling	Men's Keirin	6 October
Silver	George Atkins	Cycling	Men's points race	6 October
Silver	Reiss Beckford	Gymnastics	Men's artistic individual all-around	6 October
Silver	Simon Miller	Aquatics	Men's 50 m freestyle S9	6 October
Silver	Ellen Gandy	Aquatics	Women's 100 m butterfly	7 October
Silver	Simon Burnett	Aquatics	Men's 100 m freestyle	7 October
Silver	Joseph Roebuck	Aquatics	Men's 400 m individual medley	7 October
Silver	Jenna Randall	Aquatics	Women's solo	7 October
Silver	Olivia Allison; Jenna Randall	Aquatics	Women's duet	7 October
Silver*	Katherine Endacott	Athletics	Women's 100 m	7 October
Silver	Mark Lewis-Francis	Athletics	Men's 100 m	7 October
Silver	Reiss Beckford	Gymnastics	Men's floor	7 October
Silver	Max Whitlock	Gymnastics	Men's pommel horse	7 October
Silver	Luke Folwell	Gymnastics	Men's rings	7 October
Silver	Nick Baxter; Mick Gault	Shooting	Men's 10 m air pistol pairs	7 October
Silver	Stephanie Millward	Aquatics	Women's 100 m freestyle S9	7 October
Silver	Dan West	Athletics	Men's shot put (F32/34/52)	7 October
Silver	Antony James	Aquatics	Men's 100 m butterfly	8 October
Silver	Francesca Halsall	Aquatics	Women's 50 m freestyle	8 October
Silver	Elizabeth Simmonds	Aquatics	Women's 200 m backstroke	8 October
Silver	Gemma Spofforth	Aquatics	Women's 50 m backstroke	8 October
Silver	Joseph Roebuck	Aquatics	Men's 200 m individual medley	8 October
Silver	Amy Smith; Francesca Halsall; Emma Saunders; Jessica Sylvester	Aquatics	Women's 4 × 100 m freestyle	8 October
Silver	England; Naomi Folkard; Amy Oliver; Alison Williamson	Archery	Women's recurve team	8 October
Silver	William Sharman	Athletics	Men's 110 m hurdles	8 October
Silver	Alex Smith	Athletics	Men's hammer throw	8 October
Silver	Luke Folwell	Gymnastics	Men's parallel bars	8 October
Silver	Abbey Burton; Anita North	Shooting	Women's trap pairs	8 October
Silver	James Huckle; Kenneth Parr	Shooting	Men's 50 m rifle 3 positions pairs	8 October
Silver	James Willstrop	Squash	Men's singles	8 October
Silver	Jenny Duncalf	Squash	Women's singles	8 October
Silver	Gemma Spofforth; Kate Haywood; Ellen Gandy; Francesca Halsall	Aquatics	Women's 4 × 100 m medley	9 October
Silver	Christopher White	Archery	Men's compound individual	9 October
Silver	Greg Rutherford	Athletics	Men's long jump	9 October
Silver	England; Andrew Baggaley; Paul Drinkhall; Darius Knight; Liam Pitchford; Daniel Reed	Table tennis	Men's team	9 October
Silver	Ross Hutchins; Ken Skupski	Tennis	Men's doubles	9 October
Silver	Stephanie Millward	Aquatics	Women's 100 m butterfly S9	9 October
Silver	Alison Williamson	Archery	Women's individual recurve	10 October
Silver	Elizabeth Armitstead	Cycling	Women's road race	10 October
Silver	Steven Lewis	Athletics	Men's pole vault	11 October
Silver	Stuart Airey; Merv King	Lawn bowls	Men's pairs	11 October
Silver	Michelle Smith; Sharon Lee	Shooting	Women's 50 m rifle prone pairs	11 October
Silver	Abiodun Oyepitan	Athletics	Women's 200 m	11 October
Silver	England; Kelly Massey; Vicki Barr; Meghan Beesley; Nadine Okyere; Joice Maduaka	Athletics	Women's 4 × 400 metres relay	12 October
Silver	Mike Babb; Richard Wilson	Shooting	Men's 50 m rifle prone pairs	12 October
Silver	Alex Dowsett	Cycling	Men's time trial	13 October
Silver	Bradley Saunders	Boxing	Men's Light Welterweight 64 kg	13 October
Silver	Anthony Ogogo	Boxing	Men's Middleweight 75 kg	13 October
Silver	Callum Smith	Boxing	Men's Welterweight 69 kg	13 October
Silver	Jenny Duncalf; Laura Massaro	Squash	Women's doubles	13 October
Silver	Rajiv Ouseph	Badminton	Men's singles	14 October
Silver	Anthony Clark; Nathan Robertson	Badminton	Men's doubles	14 October
Silver	Jenny Wallwork; Nathan Robertson	Badminton	Mixed doubles	14 October
Bronze	Rebecca Adlington	Aquatics	Women's 200 m freestyle	4 October
Bronze	Gorgs Geikie; Julia Lydall	Shooting	Women's 25 m pistol pairs	5 October
Bronze	Kate Haywood	Aquatics	Women's 50 m breaststroke	5 October
Bronze	Stephanie Millward	Aquatics	Women's 50 m freestyle S9	5 October
Bronze	Francesca Halsall	Aquatics	Women's 100 m freestyle	6 October
Bronze	James Huckle	Shooting	Men's 10 m air rifle singles	6 October
Bronze	Zoe Smith	Weightlifting	Women's 58 kg	6 October
Bronze	Gemma Prescott	Athletics	Women's shot put (F32–34/52/53)	6 October
Bronze	England; Joanne Jackson; Rebecca Adlington; Emma Saunders; Sasha Matthews	Aquatics	Women's 4 × 200 m freestyle relay	6 October
Bronze	Anna Blyth	Cycling	Women's 10 km scratch race	7 October
Bronze	Zoe Derham	Athletics	Women's hammer throw	7 October
Bronze	Lawrence Clark	Athletics	Men's 110 m hurdles	8 October
Bronze	Kate Haywood	Aquatics	Women's 100 m breaststroke	8 October
Bronze	Mike Floyd	Athletics	Men's hammer throw	8 October
Bronze	Martin Brockman	Athletics	Men's decathlon	8 October
Bronze	England; Chris Adcock; Mariana Agathangelou; Carl Baxter; Liz Cann; Anthony Clark; Heather Olver; Rajiv Ouseph; Nathan Robertson; Jenny Wallwork; Gabrielle White	Badminton	Mixed team	8 October
Bronze	Max Whitlock	Gymnastics	Men's horizontal bar	8 October
Bronze	Aaron Heading; Dave Kirk	Shooting	Men's trap pairs	8 October
Bronze	Peter Barker	Squash	Men's singles	8 October
Bronze	Ellen Gandy	Aquatics	Women's 200 m butterfly	9 October
Bronze	Keri-Anne Payne	Aquatics	Women's 400 m individual medley	9 October
Bronze	Daniel Fogg	Aquatics	Men's 1500 m freestyle	9 October
Bronze	England; Liam Tancock; Daniel Sliwinski; Antony James; Simon Burnett	Aquatics	Men's 4 × 100 m medley	9 October
Bronze	James Huckle	Shooting	Men's 50 m rifles 3 position singles	9 October
Bronze	Sasha Madyarchyk	Wrestling	Men's freestyle 60 kg	9 October
Bronze	Leon Rattigan	Wrestling	Men's freestyle 96 kg	9 October
Bronze	Robert Welbourn	Aquatics	Men's 100 m freestyle S10	9 October
Bronze	Grace Clements	Athletics	Women's heptathlon	9 October
Bronze	Carl Myerscough	Athletics	Men's discus throw	10 October
Bronze	Sian Gordon; Sandy Hazell; Jamie-Lea Winch	Lawn bowls	Women's triples	10 October
Bronze	Mark Bantock; Rob Newman; Graham Shadwell	Lawn bowls	Men's triples	10 October
Bronze	Sarah Borwell; Ken Skupski	Tennis	Mixed doubles	10 October
Bronze	Max Eaves	Athletics	Men's pole vault	11 October
Bronze	Richard Brickell; Clive Bramley	Shooting	Men's skeet pairs	11 October
Bronze	Kate Dennison	Athletics	Women's pole vault	12 October
Bronze	England; Conrad Williams; Nick Leavey; Richard Yates; Robert Tobin; David Hughes; Graham Hedman	Athletics	Men's 4 × 400 metres relay	12 October
Bronze	England; Rachel Ennis; Francesca Fox; Lynne Hutchison	Gymnastics	Women's rhythmic team all-around	12 October
Bronze	Mick Gault; Iqbal Ubhi	Shooting	Men's 25 metre standard pistol pairs	12 October
Bronze	Joanna Parker; Paul Drinkhall	Table tennis	Mixed doubles	12 October
Bronze	Andrew Baggaley; Liam Pitchford	Table tennis	Men's doubles	13 October
Bronze	Julia Shaw	Cycling	Women's 29 km road time trial	13 October
Bronze	Jon Underwood; Parag Patel	Shooting	Men's full bore rifle open pairs	13 October
Bronze	Elizabeth Cann	Badminton	Women's singles	13 October
Bronze	England; Ashleigh Ball; Charlotte Craddock; Crista Cullen; Alex Danson; Susie Gilbert; Hannah Macleod; Helen Richardson; Chloe Rogers; Natalie Seymour; Beth Storry; Georgie Twigg; Laura Unsworth; Kate Walsh; Sally Walton; Nicola White; Kerry Williams	Hockey	Women's team	13 October
Bronze	England; Karen Atkinson; Sara Bayman; Eboni Beckford-Chambers; Louisa Brownfield; Jade Clarke; Pamela Cookey; Rachel Dunn; Stacey Francis; Tamsin Greenway; Jo Harten; Geva Mentor; Sonia Mkoloma	Netball	Women's team	14 October

Medals by sport
Sport	gold	silver	bronze	Total
Aquatics	9	18	11	38
Archery	4	3	0	7
Athletics	7	9	10	26
Badminton	0	3	2	5
Boxing	2	3	0	5
Cycling	0	4	2	6
Gymnastics	4	7	2	13
Hockey	0	0	1	1
Lawn bowls	2	1	2	5
Netball	0	0	1	1
Rugby sevens	0	0	0	0
Shooting	6	6	7	19
Squash	2	3	1	6
Table tennis	0	1	2	3
Tennis	0	1	1	2
Weightlifting	0	0	1	1
Wrestling	1	1	2	4
Total	37	60	45	142

Medals by day
Day	1st place, gold medalist(s)	2nd place, silver medalist(s)	3rd place, bronze medalist(s)	Total
4 October	0	3	1	4
5 October	2	3	3	8
6 October	4	5	5	14
7 October	6	13	2	22
8 October	7	14	8	29
9 October	5	6	9	20
10 October	2	2	4	8
11 October	1	4	2	7
12 October	3	2	5	10
13 October	7	5	5	17
14 October	0	3	1	4
Total	37	60	45	142

* Katherine Endacott was originally awarded a bronze medal, but this was upgraded to a silver following the disqualification of the gold medal winner, raising England's silver medal tally to 60, and reducing the bronze tally to 45.

== England 2010 ==
Key
Qualifiers / Medal Winners
Top 8 Finish (Non Medal Winners)
Non-Qualifiers / Non Top 8 Finish

== See also ==
- England at the Commonwealth Games
- England at the 2006 Commonwealth Games
