= Shooting at the 2014 Commonwealth Games – Men's 50 metre rifle three positions =

Shooting – Men's 50 metre rifle three positions at the 2014 Commonwealth Games
- Venue: Barry Buddon Shooting Centre
- Dates: 29 July 2014
- Competitors: 20 from 12 nations

Medalists
gold medal	Daniel Rivers	England
silver medal	Sanjeev Rajput	India
bronze medal	Gagan Narang	India

The qualification round of Men's 50 metre rifle three positions event at 2014 Commonwealth Games will start at morning of 29 July 2014 at the Barry Buddon Shooting Centre, while the final will be held in the evening at the same place.

== Results ==
=== Qualification ===
Rank	Athlete	Country	Kneeling					Prone					Standing					Total
Rank	Athlete	Country	1	2	3	4	Result	1	2	3	4	Result	1	2	3	4	Result	Total
1	Daniel Rivers	England	91	97	97	96	381	97	99	99	98	393	96	95	95	97	383	1157 Q
2	Gagan Narang	India	94	98	93	95	380	97	100	96	100	393	96	96	97	94	383	1156 Q
3	Kenneth Parr	England	96	97	96	91	380	98	98	99	97	392	95	97	97	93	382	1154 Q
4	Sanjeev Rajput	India	93	98	95	98	384	98	99	99	97	393	93	93	93	97	376	1153 Q
5	Dane Sampson	Australia	94	96	95	93	378	100	99	100	99	398	95	95	90	88	368	1144 Q
6	Neil Stirton	Scotland	95	96	96	95	382	100	99	98	97	394	95	92	95	85	367	1143 Q
7	Jonathan Hammond	Scotland	98	96	95	95	384	99	100	99	97	395	91	91	92	88	362	1141 Q
8	Mohd Hadafi Jaafar	Malaysia	95	91	92	93	371	99	98	98	98	393	95	94	93	94	376	1140 Q
9	Mike Bamsey	Wales	98	94	90	95	377	98	97	96	99	390	94	87	92	97	370	1137
10	Muhamad Zubair Mohammad	Malaysia	94	93	90	90	367	95	94	95	95	379	92	93	91	94	370	1116
11	Mangala Samarakoon	Sri Lanka	94	91	91	92	368	96	98	98	95	387	88	89	91	87	355	1110
12	Simon Henry	Saint Helena	96	93	92	91	372	95	98	98	94	385	88	92	89	83	352	1109
13	Michael Brown	Australia	90	95	93	95	373	96	99	95	96	386	80	88	90	90	348	1107
14	Krishantha Kodikara	Sri Lanka	95	91	92	95	363	98	99	98	96	391	89	85	84	81	339	1093
15	Marlon Best	Barbados	90	93	87	90	360	96	96	93	94	379	70	84	77	79	310	1049
16	Lee Roy Andrews Jordie	Saint Helena	83	92	92	88	355	89	96	90	93	368	55	51	60	61	277	950
17	Ibrahim Simad	Maldives	44	81	43	50	218	93	96	97	96	382	64	62	69	60	255	855
-	Sesan Abolarin	Nigeria	-	-	-	-	-	-	-	-	-	-	-	-	-	-	-	DNS
-	Frederick Omedi	Uganda	-	-	-	-	-	-	-	-	-	-	-	-	-	-	-	DNS
-	Barau Waziri	Nigeria	-	-	-	-	-	-	-	-	-	-	-	-	-	-	-	DNS

=== Finals ===
Rank	Athlete	Country	Kneeling				Prone				Standing Elimination								Total
Rank	Athlete	Country	1	2	3	Result	1	2	3	Result	1	2	3	4	5	6	7	Result	Total
1st place, gold medalist(s)	Daniel Rivers	England	50.6	50.9	50.8	152.3	51.0	49.8	50.4	151.2	49.7	49.6	9.7	10.0	9.9	10.1	10.4	149.4	452.9
2nd place, silver medalist(s)	Sanjeev Rajput	India	50.5	49.3	48.3	148.1	49.7	51.7	51.4	152.8	48.4	47.7	10.7	9.2	10.0	10.4	9.6	146.0	446.9
3rd place, bronze medalist(s)	Gagan Narang	India	50.0	46.6	49.6	146.2	50.5	51.2	51.8	153.5	49.5	48.8	9.4	10.2	10.1	9.1	-	137.1	436.8
4	Neil Stirton	Scotland	49.3	48.5	48.4	146.2	52.1	51.6	51.0	154.7	45.8	47.9	10.3	8.8	9.6	-	-	122.4	423.3
5	Jonathan Hammond	Scotland	50.4	50.1	48.7	149.2	50.3	52.0	50.2	152.5	45.2	48.5	8.3	9.5	-	-	-	111.5	413.2
6	Kenneth Parr	England	50.9	46.6	50.5	148.0	51.3	51.0	52.0	154.3	43.9	47.4	8.3	-	-	-	-	99.6	401.9
7	Mohd Hadafi Jaafar	Malaysia	46.4	48.1	50.9	145.4	49.0	49.3	52.0	150.3	47.0	48.9	-	-	-	-	-	95.9	391.6
8	Dane Sampson	Australia	47.7	47.3	48.4	143.4	49.9	50.2	51.4	151.5	49.6	-	-	-	-	-	-	49.6	391.4
