= Shooting at the 2014 Commonwealth Games – Men's 50 metre rifle prone =

Shooting – Men's 50 metre rifle prone at the 2014 Commonwealth Games
- Venue: Barry Buddon Shooting Centre
- Dates: 28 July 2014
- Competitors: 43 from 24 nations

Medalists
gold medal	Warren Potent	Australia
silver medal	Gagan Narang	India
bronze medal	Kenneth Parr	England

The qualification round of Men's 50 metre rifle prone event started at morning of 28 July 2014 at the Barry Buddon Shooting Centre, while the final was also held in the evening at the same place.

== Results ==
=== Qualification ===
Rank	Name	Country	1	2	3	4	5	6	Final	Notes
1	Warren Potent	Australia	104	104.6	104.6	103.6	105.4	102.3	624.5	Q, GR
2	Kenneth Parr	England	102.8	104.6	102.7	102.2	104.8	103.7	620.8	Q
3	Gagan Narang	India	102.6	104	103.7	103.4	103.5	103.3	620.5	Q
4	Dane Sampson	Australia	103.2	102.9	102.9	104.1	103.6	103.2	619.9	Q
5	Gary Duff	Northern Ireland	101.1	104.6	102.6	103.5	104.5	103.4	619.7	Q
6	Ryan Taylor	New Zealand	102.6	101.9	103.5	104.1	103.9	103.3	619.3	Q
7	Muhammad Nasir Khan	Malaysia	103.3	103.5	103.7	101.3	104	103.4	619.2	Q
8	Neil Stirton	Scotland	102.8	102.5	103.7	103.8	102.2	103.3	618.3	Q
9	Joydeep Karmakar	India	103.3	102.7	103.2	101.6	102.7	103.5	617	
10	Abel Lim	Singapore	104.1	102.8	102.1	100.9	103.2	103.1	616.2	
11	Jonathan Hammond	Scotland	102.5	102.9	104	100.9	103.7	101.9	615.9	
12	David Phelps	Wales	102.5	102.5	102.4	103.1	102.9	102.1	615.5	
13	Martin Hunt	New Zealand	103.7	101.8	102.6	104.7	99.9	102.7	615.4	
14	Wayne Piri	Gibraltar	102.5	101.4	101.2	103.6	102.3	104.3	615.3	
15	Samuel Kelly	Northern Ireland	101	104.1	102.5	100.8	103.3	103.6	615.3	
16	Harry Creevy	Isle of Man	101.5	102.7	101.7	101.7	101.9	105.1	614.1	
17	Nasir Yasin	Pakistan	101.2	102.8	104.3	102.8	99.5	102.8	613.4	
18	Muhammad Hassanul Adzhar	Malaysia	102.7	102.5	103	101.9	100.6	102.6	613.3	
19	Mike Bamsey	Wales	103.4	99.8	101.5	101.9	102.4	103.9	612.9	
20	Daniel Rivers	England	99.6	103.9	101.6	102.2	103.1	101	611.4	
21	Wynn Payne	Canada	101	101.6	101.4	101.5	102.8	100.9	609.2	
22	Jordie Lee Roy Andrews	Saint Helena	102.6	102.8	98.1	103.7	102.9	97.8	607.9	
23	Gulraaj Singh Sehmi	Kenya	100.1	101.5	102.2	102.1	101.8	98.7	606.4	
24	Richard John Bouchard	Jersey	99.8	100.7	103.4	101.6	102.6	98	606.1	
25	Hassan Abdul Gafoor	Maldives	99.3	99.3	102.6	102	101.2	101.6	606	
26	Benjamin Kelly	Isle of Man	98.7	101.9	99.1	102.3	103.3	99.2	604.5	
27	Albert Buhagiar	Gibraltar	100.5	96.1	100.9	101.8	102.3	102.2	603.8	
28	Gurupreet Singh Danjal	Kenya	99.8	99.4	100	100.6	102	101.4	603.2	
29	Krishantha Kodikara	Sri Lanka	95.1	99.8	101.2	99.8	103.2	102.8	602	
30	Indika Perera	Sri Lanka	97.6	101.1	100.1	101.6	100.5	99.5	600.1	
31	Marlon Moses	Trinidad and Tobago	97.9	98.8	99.8	100.1	102	100.9	599.5	
32	Ahmed Mumthaz	Maldives	99.9	98	98.5	102	96.9	97.5	592.8	
33	Marlon Best	Barbados	97.6	101.9	98.4	94.5	98.5	97.3	588.2	
34	Louis Estwick	Barbados	99.2	91	98.9	97.4	88	100.2	574.7	
35	Frederick Omedi	Uganda	94.1	92.4	92.2	96.8	95.1	92.8	563.4	
36	Patrick Young	Saint Helena	83.7	93	91.4	93.5	92.9	95.5	550	
37	Emmanuel Koli	Ghana	88.7	90.9	95.4	97.5	87.3	89.1	548.9	
38	Jeremy Nigel Poncet	Falkland Islands	88.6	75.5	85.4	75.4	71.9	89.6	486.4	
39	Joseph Dzorvakpor	Ghana	68.6	75.4	79.1	83.1	70.1	82.9	459.9	
40	Stephen Le Couilliard	Jersey	103.3	101.8	101.1	−	−	−	306.2	DNF
−	Charles Adewumni	Nigeria	−	−	−	−	−	−	−	DNS
−	Akeem Animasaun	Nigeria	−	−	−	−	−	−	−	DNS
−	Michael Goss	Falkland Islands	−	−	−	−	−	−	−	DNS

=== Final ===
Rank	Name	Country	1	2	3	4	5	6	7	8	9	Final	Notes
1st place, gold medalist(s)	Warren Potent	Australia	30.4	31.1	20.1	20.3	20.4	20.7	20.8	20.4	20.1	204.3	FGR
2nd place, silver medalist(s)	Gagan Narang	India	30.5	31.4	19.1	19.7	20.5	20.9	20	20.5	21	203.6	
3rd place, bronze medalist(s)	Kenneth Parr	England	29.8	30.5	18.8	21.2	20.3	20	20.5	20.8	−	182	
4	Dane Sampson	Australia	30.8	30	21.2	19.9	20.2	19.6	19.1	−	−	160.8	
5	Muhammad Nasir Khan	Malaysia	30.4	29.7	19.5	20.7	19.7	19.7	−	−	−	139.7	
6	Ryan Taylor	New Zealand	30	30.8	19.1	19.3	19.3	−	−	−	−	118.5	
7	Gary Duff	Northern Ireland	29.2	30.5	19.4	19.4	−	−	−	−	−	98.4	
8	Neil Stirton	Scotland	28.2	31.7	18.7	−	−	−	−	−	−	78.6	
