= Shooting at the 2010 Commonwealth Games – Men's 50 metre rifle prone pairs =

The Men's 50 metre rifle prone pairs event of the 2010 Commonwealth Games took place on 12 October 2010 at the CRPF Campus.

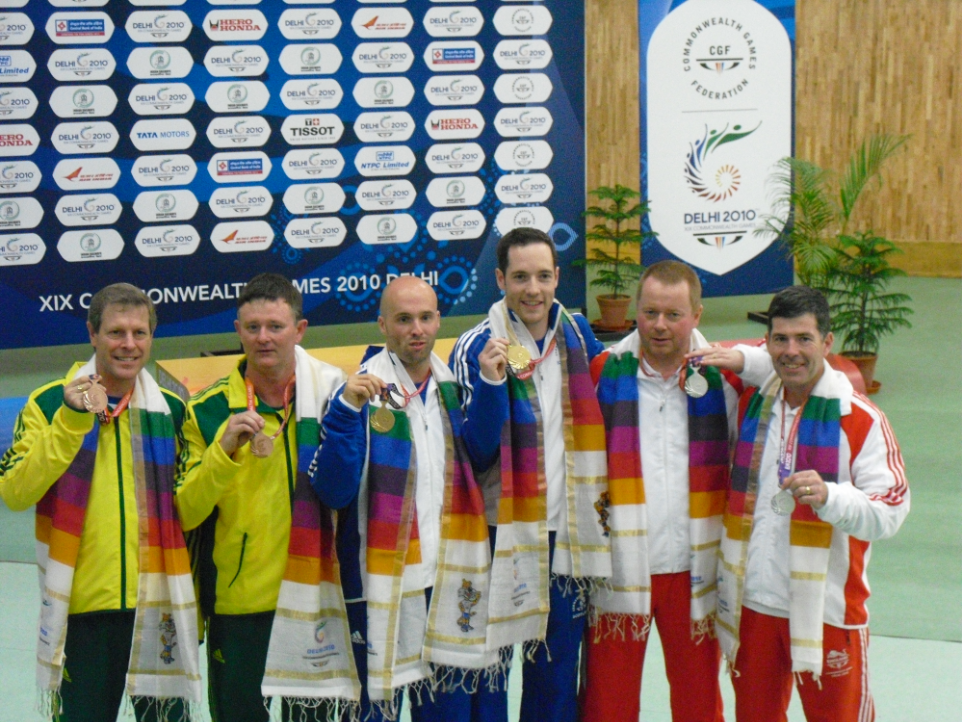
From the left: Warren Potent, David Clifton, Neil Stirton, Jonathan Hammond, Mike Babb, and Richard Wilson.

== Results ==
Rank	Name	Country	1	2	3	4	5	6	Ind. total	Total
1st place, gold medalist(s)	Neil Stirton	Scotland	97	99	98	100	100	98	592^{39}	1181^{74}
1st place, gold medalist(s)	Jonathan Hammond	Scotland	99	99	97	100	98	96	589^{35}	1181^{74}
2nd place, silver medalist(s)	Mike Babb	England	99	98	99	99	97	99	591^{35}	1178^{59}
2nd place, silver medalist(s)	Richard Wilson	England	98	98	98	97	98	98	587^{24}	1178^{59}
3rd place, bronze medalist(s)	Warren Potent	Australia	100	99	100	98	97	100	594^{42}	1174^{64}
3rd place, bronze medalist(s)	David Clifton	Australia	97	97	99	95	95	97	580^{22}	1174^{64}
4	Gary Duff	Northern Ireland	97	99	98	97	100	97	588^{23}	1174^{61}
4	Matthew Hall	Northern Ireland	99	99	99	95	98	96	586^{27}	1174^{61}
5	Gagan Narang	India	99	99	99	99	98	99	593^{30}	1173^{53}
5	Hariom Singh	India	98	97	96	96	94	99	580^{23}	1173^{53}
6	Shahril Sahak	Malaysia	99	99	97	97	96	99	587^{29}	1171^{53}
6	Hadafi Jaafar	Malaysia	98	97	99	96	97	97	584^{24}	1171^{53}
7	David Moore	Isle of Man	94	96	99	98	98	100	585^{28}	1168^{54}
7	Henry Creevy	Isle of Man	99	99	97	97	96	95	583^{26}	1168^{54}
8	Ryan Taylor	New Zealand	100	97	99	99	96	97	588^{33}	1166^{51}
8	Adrian Black	New Zealand	94	99	96	95	96	98	578^{18}	1166^{51}
9	Ramjan Ali	Northern Ireland	96	94	98	98	100	96	582^{29}	1162^{54}
9	Abdullah Baki	Northern Ireland	97	97	96	97	94	99	580^{25}	1162^{54}
10	David Phelps	Wales	96	96	97	99	96	97	581^{30}	1160^{55}
10	Jamie Dummer	Wales	98	98	97	98	96	92	579^{25}	1160^{55}
11	Wayne Piri	Gibraltar	100	98	95	97	98	96	584^{28}	1160^{50}
11	Albert Buhagiar	Gibraltar	97	97	93	97	97	95	576^{22}	1160^{50}
12	Jun Ong	Singapore	94	97	99	98	97	95	580^{21}	1155^{41}
12	Kasmijan Kimin	Singapore	97	96	96	96	96	94	575^{20}	1155^{41}
13	Carl Reid	Bermuda	97	99	95	92	96	96	575^{29}	1149^{50}
13	Ross Roberts	Bermuda	95	97	95	98	92	97	574^{21}	1149^{50}
14	Stephen le Couillard	Jersey	100	99	94	98	95	91	577^{26}	1147^{42}
14	Marc Yates	Jersey	92	97	96	93	94	98	570^{16}	1147^{42}
15	Aftab Khan	Trinidad and Tobago	95	96	95	96	97	95	574^{20}	1147^{39}
15	Curtis Blunt	Trinidad and Tobago	96	97	97	95	95	93	573^{19}	1147^{39}
16	Mangala Samarakoon	Sri Lanka	100	94	98	98	96	97	583^{28}	1135^{36}
16	Mudiyanselage Chandrasiri	Sri Lanka	98	92	85	93	89	95	552^{8}	1135^{36}
17	Hassan Abdul	Maldives	95	96	93	93	90	92	559^{14}	1118^{27}
17	Abdulla Mohamed	Maldives	96	89	91	99	92	92	559^{13}	1118^{27}
18	Rico Yon	Saint Helena	97	95	92	94	94	95	567^{16}	1099^{24}
18	Carlos Yon	Saint Helena	88	90	88	90	88	88	532^{8}	1099^{24}
19	Macqugua Baltimore	Antigua and Barbuda	89	88	92	95	92	93	549^{8}	1092^{14}
19	Christopher Joseph	Antigua and Barbuda	90	94	90	93	87	89	543^{6}	1092^{14}
