= Shooting at the 2010 Commonwealth Games – Men's 50 metre rifle prone singles =

The Men's 50 metre rifle prone singles event took place at 13 October 2010 at the CRPF Campus. There was a qualification round held to determine the finalists.

== Results ==
Rank	Name	1	2	3	4	5	6	Final	Total
1st place, gold medalist(s)	Jonathan Hammond (SCO)	99	100	99	100	98	99	101.9	696.9
2nd place, silver medalist(s)	Warren Potent (AUS)	100	100	99	99	98	98	101.4	695.4
3rd place, bronze medalist(s)	Matthew Hall (NIR)	99	99	98	98	100	99	101.1	694.1
4	Mike Babb (ENG)	99	98	100	98	100	97	101.9	693.9
5	Neil Stirton (SCO)	99	99	100	99	98	97	101.7	693.7
6	Gary Duff (NIR)	100	99	98	99	98	98	101.1	693.1
7	Mangala Samarakoon (SRI)	98	100	98	98	98	98	100.4	690.4
8	Hariom Singh (IND)	98	99	98	99	98	99	98.6	689.6
