= Gymnastics at the 2010 Commonwealth Games – Men's vault =

The Men's vault event took place on 8 October 2010 at the Indira Gandhi Arena.

== Final ==
Position	Gymnast	D Score	E Score	Penalty	Score 1	D Score	E Score	Penalty	Score 2	Total
1st place, gold medalist(s)	Luke Folwell (ENG)	6.600	9.250		15.850	6.600	9.075		15.675	15.762
2nd place, silver medalist(s)	Ashish Kumar (IND)	7.000	9.150		16.150	6.600	8.175	0.3	14.475	15.312
3rd place, bronze medalist(s)	Ian Galvan (CAN)	6.600	8.775	0.3	15.075	6.200	9.100	0.3	15.000	15.037
4	Reiss Beckford (ENG)	5.800	9.175	0.1	14.875	6.600	8.525		15.125	15.000
5	Patrick Peng (NZL)	6.200	8.875		15.075	6.200	9.025	0.3	14.925	15.000
6	Clinton Purnell (WAL)	6.200	8.875	0.1	14.975	6.200	8.800	0.3	14.700	14.837
7	Grant Gardiner (WAL)	6.200	8.775		14.975	6.200	8.275	0.1	14.375	14.675
8	Thomas Pichler (AUS)	6.200	7.950	0.3	13.850	5.400	9.300		14.700	14.275
Position	Gymnast	Vault 1				Vault 2				Total
