= James Huckle =

English sport shooter and Olympian

Personal information
- National team: Great Britain; England
- Born: 17 September 1990 (age 35) Harlow, Essex
- Years active: 2007-2012

Sport
- Sport: Shooting sport
- Events: 10 metre air rifle; 50 metre rifle three positions; 50 metre rifle prone
Medal record
Men's shooting
Commonwealth Games
Representing England
Silver medal – second place	2010 Delhi	10 m air rifle pairs
Silver medal – second place	2010 Delhi	50 m rifle 3 positions pairs
Bronze medal – third place	2010 Delhi	10 m air rifle singles
Bronze medal – third place	2010 Delhi	50 m rifle 3 positions singles

James Charles Huckle (born 17 September 1990) is an English former sport shooter, who represented Great Britain at the 2012 Summer Olympics. He won three gold medals at the 2008 Commonwealth Youth Games in India, and at the 2010 Commonwealth Games he won a total of four medals, two silver and two bronze.

== Early life and education ==
Huckle was born on 17 September 1990 in Harlow, Essex. He is one of triplets with a brother and sister the same age.

He began shooting after his father purchased a rifle to deal with a rat problem on his farm. At the age of 16, he saved to buy his first competition rifle.

== Shooting career ==
=== 2008 ===
Huckle's international debut for England was at the 2008 Commonwealth Youth Games in India where he won all three men's rifle events.

=== 2010 ===
Huckle won four medals representing England at the 2010 Commonwealth Games held in Delhi, India. Competing with Kenneth Parr he won a silver medal in the men's 10 metre air rifle pairs. Parr and Huckle finished with a score of 1174 points, 19 points behind India's Abhinav Bindra and Gagan Narang who set a new Commonwealth Games record. In the individual 10 metre air rifle Huckle came into the final in fourth place, two points behind Parr, but overtook his team mate to win the bronze medal, with gold and silver being taken by Bindra and Narang.

In the pairs three position 50 metres rifle event Huckle and Parr finished in a tie for second, behind Narang and Bindra, having recorded the same score as Scottish pair Neil Stirton and Jonathan Hammond but were awarded the silver medal on the x count, an additional target within the maximum 10 target. In the individual 50 metre rifle three positions Huckle scored 1254.9 points to win the bronze medal; Gold was won by Narang and silver by Hammond.

As a result of winning four Commonwealth medals Huckle was awarded the Sports Personality of the Year trophy at the Essex Sports Awards 2010.

=== 2011 ===
At the 2011 ISSF World Cup in Korea he broke double Olympic gold medallist Malcolm Cooper's British record in the three positions rifle. In the 50 metres rifle prone event he achieved the minimum qualifying standard for the 2012 Summer Olympics with a score of 591 points at the ISSF World Cup in Fort Benning, United States.

Huckle was named as one of the 2011 Team Essex Ambassadors for the 2012 London Olympics, receiving a £6,500 bursary from Essex County Council in exchange for visiting schools and community groups in order to inspire people about the 2012 Olympic and Paralympic Games. In November he was again named as a Team Essex Ambassador for 2012 and also won his second Sports Personality of the year award.

=== 2012 ===
Huckle was selected as one of ten shooters to represent Great Britain at the 2012 Summer Olympics in London. He competed in the men's 50 metre rifle three positions and men's 50 metre rifle prone events at the Royal Artillery Barracks in Woolwich, and also the 10 m air rifle competition.

== Career after shooting ==
Huckle transitioned to tech and finance following his shooting career:

- Quantitative Development: Built trading platforms at GS Trading and crypto indices at CryptoCompare.
- Machine Learning: Applied advanced ML techniques to crypto, equities, and FX markets.
- Entrepreneurship: Founded Counterpoise Finance, managing crypto portfolios (2021-2024).
- AI Leadership: Head of Research and Development at AutogenAI between 2022 and 2024 working directly to Sean Williams and co-authoring "Easy Problems that Large Language Models get Wrong" with him.
- Healthcare AI: Head of AI at 32Co since 2025, focusing on orthodontics and tech.
