= Jonathan Hammond (sport shooter) =

Scottish sport shooter

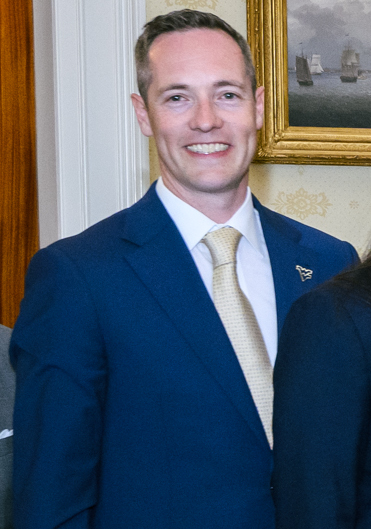
- Hammond in 2026

Personal information
- Born: 1 October 1980 (age 45) Aberdeen, Scotland

Jonathan Hammond
Medal record

Men's shooting

Representing United Kingdom

ISSF World Shooting Championships
Gold medal – first place	1998 Barcelona	50m Rifle Prone Junior

Representing Scotland

Commonwealth Games
Gold medal – first place	2010 Delhi	50 m rifle prone pairs
Gold medal – first place	2010 Delhi	50 m rifle prone singles
Silver medal – second place	2010 Delhi	50 m rifle 3 positions singles
Bronze medal – third place	2010 Delhi	50 m rifle 3 positions pairs

Jonathan William James Hammond (born 1 October 1980) is a British sport shooter, who has competed for Scotland at the Commonwealth Games and Great Britain at the Olympics. He is currently the head coach of the rifle team at the West Virginia University.

== Early life ==
Hammond was born on 1 October 1980 in Aberdeen, Scotland. He began shooting at Ardvreck School in Crieff, Perthshire and at the age of 13 he won the Scottish under-18s championships. At the age of 17 he won the World Junior Championship in prone rifle. He has a BA in geography and a master's in sport management.

== 2008 Olympics ==
At the 2008 Summer Olympics held in Beijing, China, Hammond competed in three events as the sole representative in rifle for Great Britain. In his first event, the men's 10 metres air rifle, Hammond scored 589 points to finish in 29th place as Abhinav Bindra won to become India's first ever individual Olympic gold medallist. Hammond came 34th in the 50 metre rifle prone again scoring 589 points as gold was won by Artur Ayvazian of Ukraine. In the 50 metres rifle three positions Hammond finished 42nd out of the 49 athletes who started in an event that was won by China's Qiu Jian

== 2010 Commonwealth Games ==
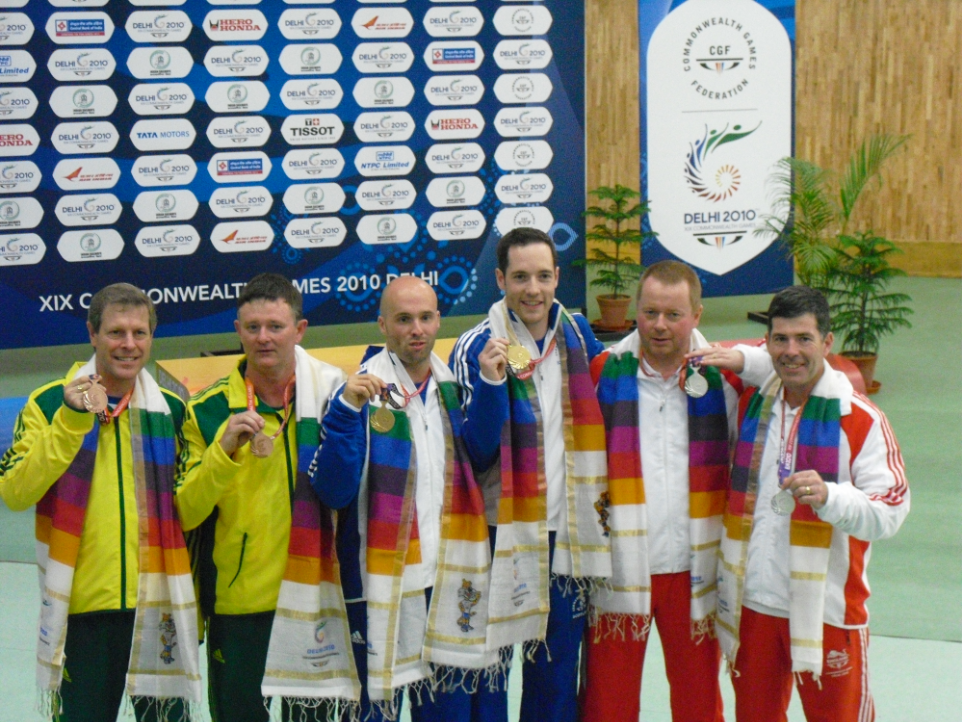
From the left: Warren Potent, David Clifton, Neil Stirton, Jonathan Hammond, Mike Babb, and Richard Wilson with their medals after the men's 50 metre rifle prone pairs.

At the 2010 Commonwealth Games Hammond won a total of four medals, two gold, a silver and a bronze, making him the most successful Scottish athlete ever at the Games.

Hammond's first medal of the Games came in the pairs three position 50 metres rifle. Hammond and teammate Neil Stirton finished in a tie for second, behind Abhinav Bindra and Gagan Narang of India, having recorded the same score as English pair James Huckle and Kenneth Parr but were awarded the bronze medal on the x count, an additional target within the maximum 10 target. Hammond won his silver medal in the individual 50 metre rifle three positions;Gold was won by Narang and bronze by Huckle. His first gold medal came in the 50 metres rifle prone pairs. Again partnered by Stirton the Scottish duo scored 1181-74x to beat England's Mike Babb and Richard Wilson.Hammond's second gold medal was won in men's 50 metres rifle prone singles, his score of 696.9 points beat Australian silver medallist Warren Potent's score by 1.5 points.

== 2012 Olympics ==
Hammond was selected as one of ten shooters to represent Great Britain at the 2012 Summer Olympics in London. He competed in the men's 50 metre rifle prone event held at the Royal Artillery Barracks in Woolwich and the 50 metre 3 positions. He finished in 17th in the prone and in 41st in the 3 positions event.
