= Shooting at the 2010 Commonwealth Games – Men's skeet pairs =

The Men's skeet pairs event took place at 11 October 2010 at the CRPF Campus.

== Results ==
Rank	Name	Country	1	2	3	4	Ind. Total	Total
1st place, gold medalist(s)	Georgios Achilleos	Cyprus	25	25	25	25	100	194 (EGR)
1st place, gold medalist(s)	Andreas Chasikos	Cyprus	23	24	23	24	94	194 (EGR)
2nd place, silver medalist(s)	Jason Caswell	Canada	25	23	24	25	97	191
2nd place, silver medalist(s)	Richard mcBride	Canada	24	23	23	24	94	191
3rd place, bronze medalist(s)	Richard Brickell	England	23	24	24	25	96	191
3rd place, bronze medalist(s)	Clive Bramley	England	24	24	24	23	95	191
4	Clive Farrugia	Malta	23	23	24	25	95	188
4	Darren Vella	Malta	24	24	24	21	93	188
5	Mairaj Khan	India	22	25	23	24	94	186
5	Allan Peoples	India	23	24	24	21	92	186
6	Clive Barton	Australia	24	22	25	25	96	184
6	Anthony Sottosanti	Australia	22	21	23	22	88	184
7	Ian Marsden	Scotland	21	25	22	24	92	183
7	Drew Christie	Scotland	23	23	24	21	91	183
8	Malcolm Allen	Wales	24	25	25	24	98	182
8	Rhys Price	Wales	22	19	21	22	84	182
9	Shaikh Masud	Pakistan	24	23	22	24	93	179
9	Ahmed Sultan	Pakistan	20	22	23	21	86	179
10	Iqbal Islam	Bangladesh	22	24	20	22	88	173
10	Noor Salim	Bangladesh	20	21	23	21	85	173
11	Huan Chiew	Singapore	19	23	20	23	85	168
11	Yee Lee	Singapore	20	21	20	22	83	168
12	Asaf Mahakitau	Niue	8	7	10	9	34	66
12	Sione Togiavalu	Niue	3	9	11	9	32	66
