= Shooting at the 2010 Commonwealth Games – Men's 50 metre rifle three positions singles =

The Men's 50 metre rifle three positions singles event took place at 9 October 2010 at the CRPF Campus. There was a qualification held to determine the final participants.

== Results ==
Rank	Name	Country	Prone	Standing	Kneeling	Final shots	Total
1st place, gold medalist(s)	Gagan Narang	India	395	389	388	96.2	1262.2 (FGR)
2nd place, silver medalist(s)	Jonathan Hammond	Scotland	398	373	393	91.3	1255.3
3rd place, bronze medalist(s)	James Huckle	England	394	381	382	97.9	1254.9
4	Imran Khan	India	394	382	381	95.4	1252.4
5	Hadafi Jaafar	Malaysia	388	377	387	91.9	1243.9
6	Benjamin Burge	Australia	394	362	385	93.2	1234.2
7	Kenny Parr	England	393	361	382	93.8	1136.37
8	John Croydon	Wales	394	361	381	91.6	1227.6
