= Gibraltar at the 2010 Commonwealth Games =

Gibraltar at the Commonwealth Games
- CG code: GIB
- CGA: Commonwealth Games Association of Gibraltar
- Medals: Gold 0 Silver 0 Bronze 0 Total 0

Commonwealth Games appearances (overview)
- 1958; 1962; 1966; 1970; 1974; 1978; 1982; 1986; 1990; 1994; 1998; 2002; 2006; 2010; 2014; 2018; 2022; 2026; 2030

Gibraltar competed in the 2010 Commonwealth Games held in Delhi, India, from 3 to 14 October 2010.

Fifteen athletes were named to the team.

== Team Gibraltar at the 2010 Commonwealth Games ==
Chef de mission – Harry Murphy
Team manager – Joe Schembri

== Aquatics ==
=== Swimming ===
==== Men ====
Event	Swimmer(s)	Heats		Semi Finals		Final	
Event	Swimmer(s)	Result	Rank	Result	Rank	Result	Rank
100m Freestyle	Suheil Harjani	55.88	36	Did Not Advance			
200m Freestyle	Colin Bensadon	2:00.32	28	n/a		Did Not Advance	
200m Freestyle	James Sanderson	2:02.18	29	n/a		Did Not Advance	
400m Freestyle	Joe Noguera	4:17.63	22	n/a		Did Not Advance	
400m Freestyle	James Sanderson	4:22.41	23	n/a		Did Not Advance	
200m medley	Colin Bensadon	2:18.49	21	n/a		Did Not Advance	
400m medley	Colin Bensadon	DSQ		n/a		Did Not Advance	

==== Women ====
Event	Swimmer(s)	Heats		Semi Finals		Final	
Event	Swimmer(s)	Result	Rank	Result	Rank	Result	Rank
100m Freestyle	Elaine Reyes	1:03.18	33	Did Not Advance			
100m Backstroke	Rachel Fortunato	1:15.10	24	Did Not Advance			
50m Butterfly	Elaine Reyes	31.31	21	Did Not Advance			

== Cycling ==
=== Road ===
==== Men ====
Event	Cyclist(s)	Time	Rank
40 km Time Trial	Jonathan Bellido	58:01.24	26
40 km Time Trial	Lee Calderon	1:01:17.71	41
167 km Road Race	Chris Walker	DNF	

== Gymnastics ==
=== Rhythmic ===
Event	Gymnast(s)	Final	
Event	Gymnast(s)	Points	Rank
Individual All-Round	Georgina Cassar	71.725	15

== Shooting ==
=== Clay Target ===
Men

Event	Shooter(s)	Final	
Event	Shooter(s)	Points	Rank
Trap Pairs	Kevin Cowles; Gary Cooper	176	14

=== Pistol ===
Men

Event	Shooter(s)	Final	
Event	Shooter(s)	Points	Rank
25m centre fire pistol singles	Jonathan Patron	551	23

=== Small Bore and Air Rifle ===
Men

Event	Shooter(s)	Final	
Event	Shooter(s)	Points	Rank
50m rifle prone pairs	Albert Buhagair; Wayne Piri	1160	11

== Tennis ==
Event	Competitor	Round of 32	Round of 16	Quarter Final	Semi Final	Final	Rank
Event	Competitor	Opposition Results	Opposition Result	Opposition Result	Opposition Result	Opposition Result	Rank
Women	Amanda Carreras	(Kiribati) Keeba (KIR); W 6–2 6–1	(Australia) Rogowska (AUS); L 2–6 4–6	Did Dot Advance			Second Round

== See also ==
- 2010 Commonwealth Games
