= Shooting at the 2010 Commonwealth Games – Men's double trap singles =

The Men's double trap singles event took place on 7 October 2010, at the CRPF Campus.

== Results ==
Rank	Name	Country	Round 1	Round 2	Round 3	Final shots	Total
1st place, gold medalist(s)	Stevan Walton	England	49	49	45	47	190 (GR)
2nd place, silver medalist(s)	Ronjan Sodhi	India	47	48	44	47	186^{+8}
3rd place, bronze medalist(s)	Timothy Kneale	Isle of Man	47	47	46	46	186^{+7+6}
4	Asher Noria	India	48	46	45	47	186^{+7+5}
5	Russell Mark	Australia	45	48	49	41	183
6	Steven Scott	England	44	49	44	4	181
