= Gymnastics at the 2010 Commonwealth Games – Men's artistic individual all-around =

The Men's artistic individual all-around event took place on 6 October 2010 at the Indira Gandhi Arena.

== Final ==
Position	Gymnast	Floor (gymnastics)	Pommel horse	Rings (gymnastics)	Vault (gymnastics)	Parallel bars	Horizontal bar	Total
1st place, gold medalist(s)	Luke Folwell (ENG)	14.150	13.500	14.850	15.650	14.150	13.250	85.550
2nd place, silver medalist(s)	Reiss Beckford (ENG)	14.800	13.600	14.200	15.050	13.500	14.300	85.450
3rd place, bronze medalist(s)	Joshua Jefferis (AUS)	13.800	12.750	14.850	15.250	14.150	13.950	84.750
4	Max Whitlock (ENG)	14.200	13.300	13.950	14.650	14.500	13.850	84.450
5	Samuel Offord (AUS)	14.150	10.550	15.100	15.500	14.050	14.000	83.350
6	Misha Koudinov (NZL)	14.250	12.550	13.950	14.550	14.300	13.400	83.000
7	Thomas Pichler (AUS)	14.500	11.200	14.300	15.300	13.850	12.700	81.850
8	Ashish Kumar (IND)	14.850	12.500	13.700	16.200	12.700	11.850	81.800
9	Dimitris Krasias (CYP)	13.100	12.400	13.750	14.450	13.800	13.300	80.800
10	Robert Watson (CAN)	14.000	12.700	13.550	14.250	13.250	12.750	80.500
11	Grant Gardiner (WAL)	13.050	12.400	13.600	14.650	13.100	13.050	79.850
12	Tariq Dowers (CAN)	13.100	13.000	11.900	15.200	12.900	13.200	79.300
13	Patrick Peng (NZL)	14.350	12.150	13.550	15.350	11.600	11.750	78.750
14	Michalis Krasias (CYP)	12.900	12.350	13.050	14.000	13.450	13.000	78.750
15	Lucas Carson (NIR)	13.150	11.100	13.000	14.500	13.700	12.750	78.200
16	Matt Hennessey (WAL)	13.300	10.200	13.200	14.450	13.400	13.250	77.800
17	Ryan McKee (SCO)	14.000	11.300	13.000	14.950	13.350	10.950	77.550
18	Wan Lum (MAS)	12.900	12.300	12.650	13.550	13.150	12.150	76.700
19	Alexander Hedges (IOM)	13.200	11.800	12.150	14.350	12.750	12.400	76.650
20	Clinton Purnell (WAL)	13.850	8.650	13.150	15.100	12.600	12.300	75.650
21	William Albert (TRI)	13.250	10.500	11.550	14.550	13.350	12.000	75.200
22	John Honiball (NAM)	11.750	11.200	12.350	14.100	13.100	12.300	74.800
23	Panagiotis Aristotelous (CYP)	13.050	11.350	12.000	14.200	10.500	13.500	74.600
24	Mohd Ismail (MAS)	12.500	12.200	11.000	15.050	10.950	10.450	72.150
