= Shooting at the 2010 Commonwealth Games – Men's 10 metre air rifle singles =

The Men's 10 metre air rifle singles event took place at 6 October 2010 at the CRPF Campus. There were a qualification round held to determine the final participants.

== Results ==
Rank	Name	1	2	3	4	5	6	Final	Total
1st place, gold medalist(s)	Gagan Narang (IND)	100	100	100	100	100	100	103.6	703.6 (FGR)
2nd place, silver medalist(s)	Abhinav Bindra (IND)	99	98	100	98	100	100	103.0	698.0
3rd place, bronze medalist(s)	James Huckle (ENG)	99	100	97	99	97	99	102.5	693.5
4	Kenneth Parr (ENG)	100	98	99	98	99	99	100.0	693.0
5	Edwin Gouw (AUS)	99	99	97	100	98	98	101.9	692.9
6	Jun Ong (SIN)	98	98	99	98	99	97	103.2	692.2
7	Jin Zhang (SIN)	100	97	97	97	98	99	102.6	690.6
8	Tyren Vitler (AUS)	98	99	98	96	99	98	102.4	690.4
