= Swimming at the 2010 Commonwealth Games – Men's 200 metre backstroke =

The Men's 200 metre backstroke event at the 2010 Commonwealth Games took place on 6 October 2010, at the SPM Swimming Pool Complex.

Three heats were held, with most containing the maximum number of swimmers (eight). The heat in which a swimmer competed did not formally matter for advancement, as the swimmers with the top eight times from the entire field qualified for the finals.

== Heats ==
=== Heat 1 ===
Rank	Lane	Name	Nationality	Time	Notes
1	3	Charles Francis	Canada	01:59.67	Q
2	4	Ashley Delaney	Australia	02:00.44	Q
3	6	Craig McNally	Scotland	02:02.10	
4	5	Daniel Bell	New Zealand	02:02.34	
5	2	Rehan Poncha	India	02:09.71	

=== Heat 2 ===
Rank	Lane	Name	Nationality	Time	Notes
1	3	Tobias Oriwol	Canada	01:59.79	Q
2	4	Christopher Walker-Hebborn	England	02:00.57	Q
3	6	Charl Crous	South Africa	02:01.37	
4	5	Hayden Stoeckel	Australia	02:01.76	
5	2	Rohit Havaldar	India	02:09.45	
6	7	Praveen Tokas	India	02:12.67	

=== Heat 3 ===
Rank	Lane	Name	Nationality	Time	Notes
1	4	James Goddard	England	01:59.30	Q
2	6	Marco Loughran	Wales	1:59.88	Q
3	3	Ryan Bennett	England	2:00.32	Q
4	5	Gareth Kean	New Zealand	2:00.86	Q
5	2	Ian Barr	Malaysia	2:08.84	
6	7	Jeremy Matthews	Singapore	2:10.94	

== Final ==
Rank	Lane	Name	Nationality	Time	Notes
1st place, gold medalist(s)	4	James Goddard	England	1:55:58	CGR
2nd place, silver medalist(s)	8	Gareth Kean	New Zealand	1:57:37	NR
3rd place, bronze medalist(s)	7	Ashley Delaney	Australia	1:58:18	
4	1	Christopher Walker-Hebborn	England	1:59:00	
5	5	Charles Francis	Canada	2:00:07	
6	6	Marco Loughran	Wales	2:00:11	
7	3	Tobias Oriwol	Canada	2:00:24	
8	2	Ryan Bennett	England	2:01:86	
