= Swimming at the 2010 Commonwealth Games – Men's 200 metre butterfly =

The Men's 200 metre butterfly event at the 2010 Commonwealth Games took place on 4 October 2010, at the SPM Swimming Pool Complex.

Three heats were held. The heat in which a swimmer competed did not formally matter for advancement, as the swimmers with the top eight times from the entire field qualified for the finals.

== Heats ==
=== Heat 1 ===
| Rank | Lane | Name | Nationality | Time | Notes |
|---|---|---|---|---|---|
| 1 | 4 | Chad le Clos | South Africa | 1.57.92 | Q |
| 2 | 5 | Roberto Pavoni | England | 1.58.24 | Q |
| 3 | 3 | Moss Burmester | New Zealand | 1.58.93 | |
| 4 | 2 | Lewis Smith | Scotland | 2.00.73 | |
| 5 | 6 | Daniel Bego | Malaysia | 2.01.08 | |
| | 7 | Thomas Haffield | Wales | 2.05.13 | |

=== Heat 2 ===
| Rank | Lane | Name | Nationality | Time | Notes |
|---|---|---|---|---|---|
| 1 | 4 | Chris Wright | Australia | 1.57.78 | Q |
| 2 | 5 | Jayden Hadler | Australia | 1.57.90 | Q |
| 3 | 3 | Joseph Roebuck | England | 1.57.98 | Q |
| 4 | 2 | Cameron Brodie | Scotland | 2.00.16 | |
| 5 | 6 | Ian Powell | Guernsey | 2.00.65 | |
| 6 | 7 | Rehan Poncha | India | 2.04.20 | |
| 7 | 1 | Tarun Tokas | India | 2.14.09 | |

=== Heat 3 ===
| Rank | Lane | Name | Nationality | Time | Notes |
|---|---|---|---|---|---|
| 1 | 3 | Stefan Hirniak | Canada | 1.57.01 | Q |
| 2 | 6 | Sebastian Rousseau | South Africa | 1.57.45 | Q |
| 3 | 5 | Michael Rock | England | 1.58.42 | Q |
| 4 | 4 | Nick D'Arcy | Australia | 1.58.48 | |
| 5 | 2 | Andrew Mayor | Scotland | 2.01.49 | |
| 6 | 7 | Thomas Hollingsworth | Guernsey | 2.03.16 | |
| 7 | 1 | Ben Lowndes | Guernsey | 2.09.69 | |

=== Final ===
| Rank | Lane | Name | Nationality | Time | Notes |
|---|---|---|---|---|---|
| 1 | 2 | Chad le Clos | South Africa | 1.56.48 | GR |
| 2 | 8 | Michael Rock | England | 1.57.15 | |
| 3 | 4 | Stefan Hirniak | Canada | 1.57.26 | |
| 4 | 3 | Chris Wright | Australia | 1.57.32 | |
| 5 | 6 | Jayden Hadler | Australia | 1.57.37 | |
| 6 | 7 | Joseph Roebuck | England | 1.57.44 | |
| 7 | 1 | Roberto Pavoni | England | 1.58.13 | |
| 8 | 5 | Sebastian Rosseau | South Africa | 1.58.28 | |
