= Gymnastics at the 2010 Commonwealth Games – Men's horizontal bar =

The Men's artistic horizontal bar event took place on 8 October 2010, at the Indira Gandhi Arena.

== Final ==
Position	Gymnast	D Score	E Score	Penalty	Total
1st place, gold medalist(s)	Dimitris Krasias (CYP)	5.800	8.100		13.900
2nd place, silver medalist(s)	Anderson Loran (CAN)	5.800	7.825		13.625
3rd place, bronze medalist(s)	Max Whitlock (ENG)	5.500	8.075		13.575
4	Samuel Offord (AUS)	5.100	8.450		13.550
5	Reiss Beckford (ENG)	5.600	7.875		13.475
6	Jason Scott (CAN)	5.400	8.050		13.450
7	Luke Wiwatowski (AUS)	5.900	6.825		12.725
8	Panagiotis Aristotelous (CYP)	5.900	6.500		12.400
