= Max Eaves =

English pole vaulter

Personal information
- Nationality: British (English)
- Born: 31 May 1988 (age 38) Crowthorne, Berkshire, England
- Height: 1.86 m (6 ft 1 in)
- Weight: 84 kg (185 lb) (2014)

Sport
- Sport: Athletics
- Event: Pole vault
- Club: Newham & Essex Beagles
Medal record
Men's athletics
Representing England
Commonwealth Games
Bronze medal – third place	2010 Delhi	Pole vault

Maxwell Southern Eaves (born 31 May 1988) is an English former athlete specialising in the pole vault.

== Biography ==
Eaves represented England at the 2010 Commonwealth Games in Delhi.

Eaves was on the podium onfour occasions at the British Athletics Championships in 2010, 2011, 2013 and 2015.

His personal best jumps are 5.62 metres outdoors (Loughborough 2014) and 5.64 metres indoors (Jablonec 2016).

== Competition record ==
Year	Competition	Venue	Position	Notes
Representing Great Britain and England
2010	Commonwealth Games	Delhi, India	3rd	5.40 m
2012	European Championships	Helsinki, Finland	14th (q)	5.30 m
2014	Commonwealth Games	Glasgow, United Kingdom	–	NM
