= Swimming at the 2010 Commonwealth Games – Men's 100 metre backstroke =

The Men's 100 metre backstroke event at the 2010 Commonwealth Games took place on 7 and 8 October 2010, at the SPM Swimming Pool Complex.

Five heats were held, with most containing the maximum number of swimmers (eight). The top sixteen advanced to the semifinals and the top eight from there qualified for the finals.

== Heats summary ==
Rank	Heat	Lane	Name	Nationality	Time	Notes
1	2	6	Marco Loughran	Wales	54.95	Q
2	4	5	Daniel Bell	New Zealand	55.03	Q
3	4	4	Liam Tancock	England	55.15	Q
4	4	3	Christopher Walker-Hebborn	England	55.18	Q
5	2	4	Ashley Delaney	Australia	55.35	Q
6	3	5	Daniel Arnamnart	Australia	55.63	Q
7	2	3	Charl Crous	South Africa	55.69	Q
8	2	5	Gareth Kean	New Zealand	55.85	Q
9	3	3	Charles Francis	Canada	56.06	Q
10	3	6	Ryan Bennett	England	56.07	Q
11	4	2	Craig McNally	Scotland	56.92	Q
12	4	6	Tobias Oriwol	Canada	57.15	Q
13	3	7	Ian Kumarakulasinghe	Malaysia	58.54	Q
14	3	2	Balakrishnan Melkote	India	59.03	Q
15	2	7	Heshan Unamboowe	Sri Lanka	59.35	Q
16	2	8	Zane Jordan	Zambia	59.89	Q

== Semifinals ==
=== Semifinal 1 ===
Rank	Lane	Name	Nationality	Time	Notes
1	4	Daniel Bell	New Zealand	54.38	Q, CG
2	5	Christopher Walker-Hebborn	England	54.76	Q
3	6	Gareth Kean	New Zealand	55.26	Q
4	2	Ryan Bennett	England	55.50	Q
5	3	Daniel Arnamnart	Australia	55.66	
6	7	Tobias Oriwol	Canada	55.76	
7	1	Balakrishnan Melkote	India	59.25	
8	8	Zane Jordan	Zambia	59.42	

=== Semifinal 2 ===
Rank	Lane	Name	Nationality	Time	Notes
1	3	Ashley Delaney	Australia	54.31	Q, CG
2	5	Liam Tancock	England	54.32	Q
3	4	Marco Loughran	Wales	54.45	Q
4	6	Charl Crous	South Africa	55.28	Q
5	2	Charles Francis	Canada	55.88	
6	7	Craig McNally	Scotland	56.45	
7	1	Ian Kumarakulasinghe	Malaysia	58.46	
8	8	Heshan Unamboowe	Sri Lanka	58.96	

== Final ==
Rank	Lane	Name	Nationality	Time	Notes
1st place, gold medalist(s)	5	Liam Tancock	England	53.59	CG
2nd place, silver medalist(s)	3	Daniel Bell	New Zealand	54.43	
3rd place, bronze medalist(s)	4	Ashley Delaney	Australia	54.51	
4	6	Marco Loughran	Wales	54.68	
5	7	Gareth Kean	New Zealand	54.91	
6	2	Christopher Walker-Hebborn	England	55.04	
7	8	Ryan Bennett	England	55.85	
8	1	Charl Crous	South Africa	55.90	
