= Gymnastics at the 2010 Commonwealth Games – Men's pommel horse =

The Men's artistic pommel horse event took place on 7 October 2010 at the Indira Gandhi Arena.

== Final ==
Position	Gymnast	D Score	E Score	Penalty	Total
1st place, gold medalist(s)	Prashanth Sellathurai (AUS)	6.600	8.900		15.500
2nd place, silver medalist(s)	Max Whitlock (ENG)	6.500	8.625		15.125
3rd place, bronze medalist(s)	Chan Thuang Tong David-Jonathan (SIN)	5.700	8.500		14.200
4	Zi Gan (SIN)	5.100	9.050		14.150
5	Luke Folwell (ENG)	5.200	8.100		13.300
6	Anderson Loran (CAN)	5.100	7.875		12.975
7	Alex Rothe (WAL)	4.600	7.825		12.425
8	Tariq Dowers (CAN)	5.100	6.900		12.000
