= Swimming at the 2010 Commonwealth Games – Men's 200 metre individual medley =

The Men's 200 metre individual medley event at the 2010 Commonwealth Games took place on 8 October 2010, at the SPM Swimming Pool Complex.

Three heats were held, with most containing the maximum number of swimmers (eight). The top eight from there qualified for the finals.

== Heats ==
=== Heat 1 ===
Rank	Lane	Name	Nationality	Time	Notes
1	1	Leith Brodie	Australia	2:01.41	Q
2	4	Darian Townsend	South Africa	2:01.72	Q
3	5	Thomas Fraser-Holmes	Australia	2:03.32	Q
4	6	Ieuan Lloyd	Wales	2:03.55	
5	3	Robert Ford	Canada	2:03.65	
6	2	Ian Kumarakulasinghe	Malaysia	2:07.22	
7	7	Jeremy Matthews	Singapore	2:12.48	

=== Heat 2 ===
Rank	Lane	Name	Nationality	Time	Notes
1	4	Joseph Roebuck	England	2:01.80	Q
2	3	Sebastien Rousseau	South Africa	2:02.33	Q
3	6	Roberto Pavoni	England	2:03.37	
4	5	Brian Johns	Canada	2:03.91	
5	2	Thomas Hollingsworth	Guernsey	2:05.90	
6	7	Rehan Poncha	India	2:09.64	
7	1	Colin Bensadon	Gibraltar	2:18.49	

=== Heat 3 ===
Rank	Lane	Name	Nationality	Time	Notes
1	4	James Goddard	England	2:00.43	Q
2	5	Chad le Clos	South Africa	2:02.90	Q
3	6	Tobias Oriwol	Canada	2:02.97	Q
4	2	Lewis Smith	Scotland	2:03.88	
5	3	Tommaso D'Orsogna	Australia	2:06.38	
6	7	Ian Black	Jersey	2:09.69	
7	1	Agnishwar Jayaprakash	India	2:10.51	

== Final ==
Rank	Lane	Name	Nationality	Time	Notes
1st place, gold medalist(s)	4	James Goddard	England	1:58.10	CG
2nd place, silver medalist(s)	6	Joseph Roebuck	England	1:59.86	
3rd place, bronze medalist(s)	5	Leith Brodie	Australia	2:00.00	
4	3	Darian Townsend	South Africa	2:00.29	
5	7	Chad le Clos	South Africa	2:00.74	
6	8	Thomas Fraser-Holmes	Australia	2:02.31	
7	2	Sebastien Rousseau	South Africa	2:02.65	
8	1	Tobias Oriwol	Canada	2:03.09	
