= Athletics at the 2010 Commonwealth Games – Men's 110 metres hurdles =

Men's 110 metres hurdles at the Commonwealth Games

The Men's 110 metres hurdles at the 2010 Commonwealth Games as part of the athletics programme was held at the Jawaharlal Nehru Stadium on Friday 8 October 2010.

The top three runners in each of the initial two heats automatically qualified for the final alongside the two fastest athletes.

== Records ==
World Record	12.87	Dayron Robles	CUB	Ostrava, Czech Republic	12 June 2008
Games Record	13.08	Colin Jackson	WAL	Victoria, Canada	1994

== Round 1 ==
First 3 in each heat (Q) and 2 best performers (q) advance to the Final.

=== Heat 1 ===
Rank	Lane	Name	Reaction Time	Result	Notes
1	5	Eric Keddo (JAM)	0.202	13.65	Q
2	6	William Sharman (ENG)	0.168	13.66	Q
3	7	Lawrence Clarke (ENG)	0.177	13.82	Q
4	4	Ronald Forbes (CAY)	0.186	13.87	q, SB
5	3	Siddhanth Thingalaya (IND)	0.183	14.06	
6	2	Amara Kamara (SLE)	0.206	16.54	

=== Heat 2 ===
Rank	Lane	Name	Reaction Time	Result	Notes
1	4	Andy Turner (ENG)	0.174	13.58	Q
2	3	Hansle Parchment (JAM)	0.204	13.86	Q, PB
3	5	Chris Baillie (SCO)	0.213	14.03	Q
4	7	Samuel Okon (NGR)	0.248	14.06	q
5	6	Muthuswamy Pandi (IND)	0.203	14.97	

== Final ==
Rank	Lane	Name	Reaction Time	Result	Notes
1st place, gold medalist(s)	7	Andy Turner (ENG)	0.157	13.38	
2nd place, silver medalist(s)	4	William Sharman (ENG)	0.184	13.50	
3rd place, bronze medalist(s)	9	Lawrence Clarke (ENG)	0.174	13.70	
4	6	Eric Keddo (JAM)	0.196	13.71	
5	5	Hansle Parchment (JAM)	0.167	13.71	PB
6	3	Ronald Forbes (CAY)	0.190	13.84	SB
7	8	Chris Baillie (SCO)	0.190	13.97	
DSQ	2	Samuel Okon (NGR)	0.172	13.72	
