= Shooting at the 2010 Commonwealth Games – Men's 10 metre air rifle pairs =

The Men's 10 metre air rifle pairs event took place at 5 October 2010 at the CRPF Campus.

== Results ==
Rank	Name	Country	1	2	3	4	5	6	Ind. Total	Total
1st place, gold medalist(s)	Gagan Narang	India	99	100	100	99	100	100	598^{54}	1193^{105} (GR)
1st place, gold medalist(s)	Abhinav Bindra	India	100	98	99	100	99	99	595^{51}	1193^{105} (GR)
2nd place, silver medalist(s)	James Huckle	England	100	98	100	98	96	97	589^{44}	1174^{84}
2nd place, silver medalist(s)	Kenneth Parr	England	99	99	97	96	97	97	585^{40}	1174^{84}
3rd place, bronze medalist(s)	Asif Khan	Bangladesh	99	100	98	97	98	98	590^{40}	1173^{78}
3rd place, bronze medalist(s)	Abdullah Baki	Bangladesh	95	97	99	98	96	98	583^{38}	1173^{78}
4	Jin Zhang	Singapore	97	100	96	99	97	98	587^{38}	1171^{79}
4	Jun Ong	Singapore	98	99	98	98	96	95	584^{41}	1171^{79}
5	Edwin Gouw	Australia	98	98	98	100	97	98	589^{40}	1170^{70}
5	Tyren Vitler	Australia	96	98	96	97	99	95	581^{30}	1170^{70}
6	Mohd Abdul	Trinidad and Tobago	97	97	98	97	96	99	584^{37}	1162^{66}
6	Zubair Mohammad	Trinidad and Tobago	96	96	97	96	95	98	578^{29}	1162^{66}
