= Athletics at the 2010 Commonwealth Games – Women's 100 metres (T37) =

Part of 2010 commonwealth games

The Women's 100 metres (T37) at the 2010 Commonwealth Games as part of the athletics programme was held at the Jawaharlal Nehru Stadium on Thursday 7 October 2010.

== Results ==
Rank	Lane	Name	Reaction Time	Result	Notes
1st place, gold medalist(s)	6	Katrina Hart (ENG)	0.272	14.36	PB
2nd place, silver medalist(s)	4	Jenny McLoughlin (WAL)	0.247	14.68	=PB
3rd place, bronze medalist(s)	7	Johanna Benson (NAM)		14.81	
4	5	Jodi Elkington (AUS)		15.08	
5	3	Leah Robinson (CAN)		15.27	PB
6	8	Bethany Woodward (ENG)		15.27	
7	1	Megan Muscat (CAN)		15.73	SB
	2	Ajara Mohammed (GHA)		DNS	
