= Athletics at the 2010 Commonwealth Games – Women's heptathlon =

Women's heptathlon at the Commonwealth Games

The Women's heptathlon at the 2010 Commonwealth Games as part of the athletics programme was held at the Jawaharlal Nehru Stadium on Friday 8 and Saturday 9 October 2010.

== Records ==
World Record	7291	Jackie Joyner-Kersee	USA	Seoul, South Korea	24 September 1988
Games Record	6695	Jane Flemming	AUS	Auckland, New Zealand	1990

== Results ==
The best score for each event is highlighted.

Rank	Name	100m Hurdles	High Jump	Shot Put	200m	Long Jump	Javelin Throw	800m	Points	Notes
1st place, gold medalist(s)	Louise Hazel (ENG)	13.25	1.69	12.54	24.10	6.44	44.42	2:20.33	6156	PB
2nd place, silver medalist(s)	Jessica Zelinka (CAN)	13.19	1.69	13.30	24.08	6.01	41.68	2:15.26	6100	
3rd place, bronze medalist(s)	Grace Clements (ENG)	14.18	1.72	12.78	25.88	6.00	43.67	2:16.06	5819	PB
4	Peaches Roach (JAM)	13.74	1.84	10.92	24.52	5.78	32.75	2:18.54	5758	
5	Pramila Aiyappa (IND)	14.43	1.66	11.55	25.92	5.96	39.66	2:31.60	5330	
6	Sushmitha Singha Roy (IND)	14.96	1.69	10.66	26.01	5.67	38.71	2:31.94	5120	
7	Navpreet Kaur (IND)	14.65	1.63	10.67	25.08	5.28	33.48	2:26.97	5022	
–	Margaret Simpson (GHA)	13.79	1.81	12.19	25.12	5.86	DNS	–	DNF	
–	Phyllis Agbo (ENG)	14.20	1.63	13.16	25.46	DNS	–	–	DNF	
–	Selloane Tsoaeli (LES)	15.27	1.78	10.49	26.77	DNS	–	–	DNF	
–	Rebecca Wardell (NZL)	14.18	1.69	14.64	DNF	DNS	–	–	DNF	
–	Katy Sealy (BIZ)	16.40	1.66	10.11	DNS	–	–	–	DNF	
