= Grace Clements (athlete) =

British heptathlete

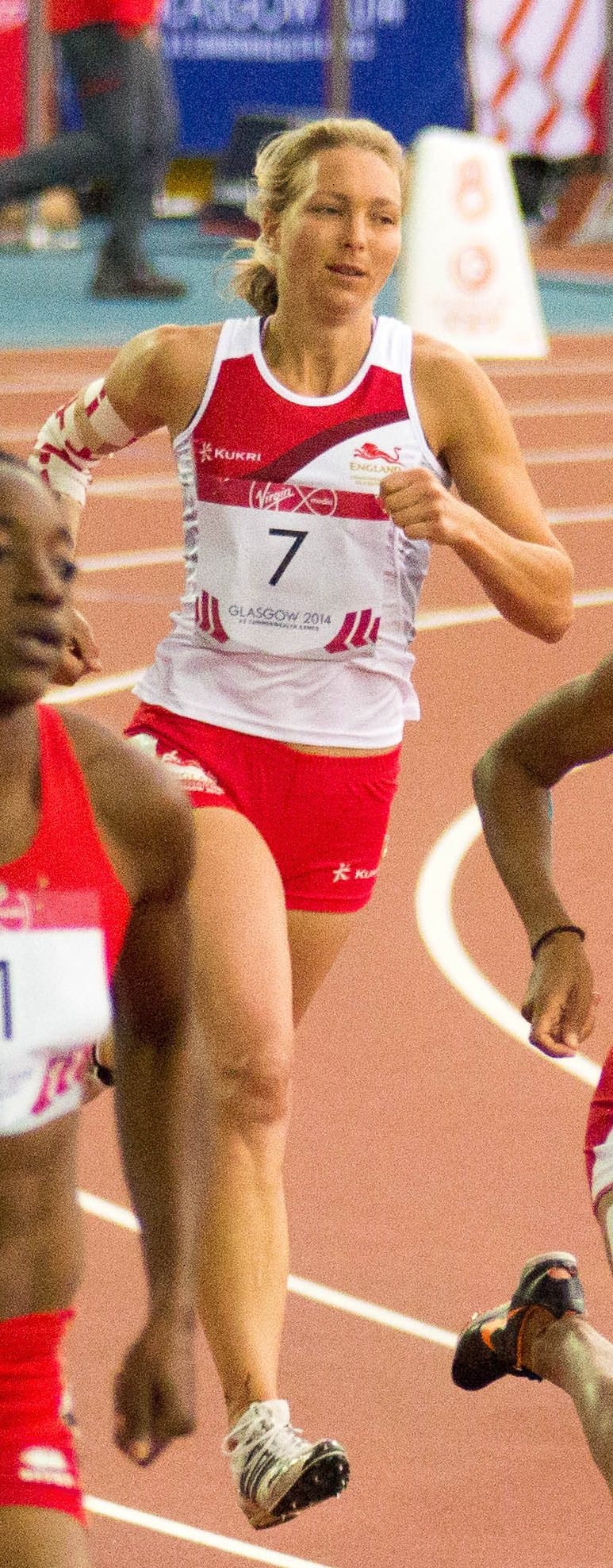
- Clements at the 2014 Commonwealth Games

Personal information
- Nationality: British (English)
- Born: 2 May 1984; Dartford, Kent, Engl;and

Sport
- Sport: Athletics
- Event: heptathlon
- Club: Southampton AC

Grace Clements (born 2 May 1984) is an English track and field athlete.

== Biography ==
Clements was born in Dartford, Kent and educated at Dartford Grammar School for Girls. She finished second behind Katia Lannon in the heptathlon event at the 2006 AAA Championships and then repeated the feat at the following two English Championships, finishing second to Phyllis Agbo in 2007 and second to Julie Hollman in 2008.

Clements represented England at the 2010 Commonwealth Games in Delhi and won a bronze medal for England competing in the heptathlon event.

Four years later she particiapetd at a second Commonwealth Games in the heptathlon event at the 2014 Commonwealth Games.

== See also ==
- England at the 2010 Commonwealth Games
