= Athletics at the 2010 Commonwealth Games – Men's shot put (F32/34/52) =

The Para Sport - Men's Shot Put F32/34/52 at the 2010 Commonwealth Games as part of the athletics programme was held at the Jawaharlal Nehru Stadium on Thursday 7 October 2010.

== Results ==
Rank	Name	Class	Points	Notes
1st place, gold medalist(s)	Kyle Pettey (CAN)	F34	1021 (11.44 m)	WR
2nd place, silver medalist(s)	Daniel West (ENG)	F34	969 (10.78 m)	
3rd place, bronze medalist(s)	Hamish MacDonald (AUS)	F34	889 (9.92 m)	
4	Damien Bowen (AUS)	F34	889 (9.92 m)	
5	Ashleigh Hellyer (WAL)	F32	753 (6.80 m)	
6	Alihan Muda (BRU)	F34	676 (8.10 m)	
7	Daniel Davies (WAL)	F32	206 (4.50 m)	SB
8	Amit Kumar (IND)	F52	43 (4.39 m)	
9	Timothy Nwanguma (NGR)	F52	2 (2.99 m)	
