= Richard Phillips (sport shooter) =

British sport shooter

Personal information
- National team: United Kingdom; England
- Born: Exeter
- Height: 183 cm (6 ft 0 in)

Sport
- Country: United Kingdom; England
- Sport: Shooting sports
- Event: 50 metre rifle prone
- Club: National Smallbore Rifle Association
- Coached by: Jock Allan
Medal record
Men's shooting
Representing England
World Shooting Championships
Gold medal – first place	2006 Zagreb	ISSF 50 meter rifle prone

Richard Phillips (born 12 January 1987) is a British sport shooter who has won gold medals at the World Shooting Championships. He represented Great Britain at the 2006 World Shooting Championships in Zagreb.
