= Athletics at the 2010 Commonwealth Games – Men's long jump =

Men's long jump at the Commonwealth Games

The Men's long jump at the 2010 Commonwealth Games as part of the athletics programme was held at the Jawaharlal Nehru Stadium on Friday 8 and Saturday 9 October 2010.

== Records ==
World Record	8.95	Mike Powell	USA	Tokyo, Japan	30 August 1991
Games Record	8.39	Yusuf Alli	NGR	Auckland, New Zealand	1990

== Results ==
=== Qualifying round ===
Qualification: Qualifying Performance 7.90 (Q) or 12 best performers (q) to the advance to the Final.

Rank	Athlete	Group	1	2	3	Result	Notes
1	Fabrice Lapierre (AUS)	A	8.00			8.00	Q
2	Chris Tomlinson (ENG)	B	7.95			7.95	Q
3	Chris Noffke (AUS)	B	7.27	x	7.89	7.89	q
4	Ignisious Gaisah (GHA)	B	7.86	7.83	7.88	7.88	q
5	Greg Rutherford (ENG)	A	x	7.74	-	7.74	q
6	Stanley Gbagbeke (NGR)	B	7.73	7.67	x	7.73	q
7	Rudon Bastian (BAH)	A	x	7.44	7.64	7.64	q
8	Ankit Sharma (IND)	B	7.39	7.56	x	7.56	q
9	Tera Langat (KEN)	A	7.44	7.36	7.50	7.50	q
10	Mahan Singh (IND)	B	x	7.47	7.49	7.49	q
11	Tyrone Smith (BER)	A	7.49	x	7.37	7.49	q
12	Zacharias Arnos (CYP)	B	7.33	7.32	7.47	7.47	q
13	Carlos Morgan (CAY)	A	x	7.47	x	7.47	
14	Carl Morgan (CAY)	B	7.24	7.33	7.46	7.46	
15	Harikrishnan (IND)	A	x	7.40	x	7.40	
16	Al Amin (BAN)	A	7.28	x	7.15	7.28	
17	Norman Tse (PNG)	B	6.92	6.80	6.81	6.92	
18	Kudzanai Alberto (MOZ)	A	6.71	x	x	6.71	
19	Boitu Baiteke (KIR)	A	6.04	x	x	6.04	
20	George Pine (KIR)	B	x	5.88	-	5.88	
	Domanique Missick (TCI)	A				DNS	

=== Final ===
Rank	Athlete	1	2	3	4	5	6	Result	Notes
1st place, gold medalist(s)	Fabrice Lapierre (AUS)	7.96	8.30	x	x	x	8.11	8.30	GR
2nd place, silver medalist(s)	Greg Rutherford (ENG)	x	8.22	7.99	7.76	7.89	8.16	8.22	SB
3rd place, bronze medalist(s)	Ignisious Gaisah (GHA)	7.89	8.12	8.01	x	7.84	6.63	8.12	SB
4	Stanley Gbagbeke (NGR)	7.90	6.23	7.91	7.91	7.98	7.85	7.98	
5	Tyrone Smith (BER)	7.27	7.70	7.76	7.50	7.70	x	7.76	
6	Chris Noffke (AUS)	7.68	x	7.56	7.41	7.58	7.59	7.68	
7	Tera Langat (KEN)	x	7.57	7.40	7.53	x	7.63	7.63	
8	Ankit Sharma (IND)	x	7.56	x	x	7.47	x	7.56	
9	Mahan Singh (IND)	7.47	7.24	7.42				7.47	
10	Rudon Bastian (BAH)	7.45	x	7.26				7.45	
11	Zacharias Arnos (CYP)	x	x	7.37				7.37	
	Chris Tomlinson (ENG)	x	x	x				NM	
