= Athletics at the 2010 Commonwealth Games – Women's 20 kilometres walk =

Women's 20 kilometres walk at the Commonwealth Games

The Women's 20 kilometres walk at the 2010 Commonwealth Games as part of the athletics programme was held on Saturday 9 October 2010.

== Records ==
World Record	1:25:41	Olimpiada Ivanova	RUS	Helsinki, Finland	7 August 2005
Games Record	1:32:46	Jane Saville	AUS	Melbourne, Australia	20 March 2006

== Results ==
Rank	Athlete	Time	Notes
1st place, gold medalist(s)	Jo Jackson (ENG)	1:34:22	
2nd place, silver medalist(s)	Claire Tallent (AUS)	1:36:55	
3rd place, bronze medalist(s)	Grace Wanjiru Njue (KEN)	1:37:49	
4	Lisa Kehler (ENG)	1:40:33	SB
5	Cheryl Webb (AUS)	1:42:03	
6	Emily Wamusyi Ngii (KEN)	1:49:01	
7	Sandhya Kakkuziyil Jolly (IND)	1:51:44	
DSQ	Rani Yadav (IND)	1:42:54	
	Deepamala Devi Leimapokpam (IND)	DNF	
