= Athletics at the 2010 Commonwealth Games – Men's pole vault =

Men's pole vault at the Commonwealth Games

The Men's pole vault at the 2010 Commonwealth Games as part of the athletics programme was held at the Jawaharlal Nehru Stadium on Monday 11 October 2010.

== Records ==
World Record	6.14	Sergey Bubka	UKR	Sestriere, Italy	31 July 1994
Games Record	5.80	Steven Hooker	AUS	Melbourne, Australia	24 March 2006

== Results ==
Rank	Athlete	4.80	4.95	5.10	5.25	5.40	5.50	5.60	5.70	Result	Notes
1st place, gold medalist(s)	Steve Hooker (AUS)	-	-	-	-	-	o	o	x-	5.60	
2nd place, silver medalist(s)	Steven Lewis (ENG)	-	-	-	xo	o	xxo	o	xxx	5.60	SB
3rd place, bronze medalist(s)	Max Eaves (ENG)	-	-	xo	o	xo	xxx			5.40	PB
4	Cheyne Rahme (RSA)	-	-	o	o	xxx				5.25	
5	Nikandros Stylianou (CYP)	-	-	xo	o	xxx				5.25	
5	Paul Walker (WAL)	-	-	xo	o	xxx				5.25	SB
7	Jason Wurster (CAN)	-	-	-	xo	xxx				5.25	
8	Alistair Strange (SCO)	xo	o	xxx						4.95	
9	Upadhyay Gajanan (IND)	o	xxx							4.80	
	Luke Cutts (ENG)	-	-	-	xxx					NM	
	Jabbari Ennis (JAM)	xxx								NM	
	Richard Hurren (SCO)	xxx								NM	
	Vadivelu Natarajan (IND)	xxx								NM	
