= Shooting at the 2010 Commonwealth Games – Men's 50 metre rifle three positions pairs =

Sporting Event

The Men's 50 metre rifle three positions pairs event took place on 8 October 2010, at the CRPF Campus.

== Results ==
Rank	Name	Country	Prone	Standing	Kneeling	Individual Total	Total
1st place, gold medalist(s)	Gagan Narang	India	397	385	385	1167^{62}	2325^{106} (CGR)
1st place, gold medalist(s)	Imran Khan	India	395	381	382	1158^{44}	2325^{106} (CGR)
2nd place, silver medalist(s)	James Huckle	England	391	383	384	1158^{57}	2308^{105}
2nd place, silver medalist(s)	Kenneth Parr	England	391	375	384	1150^{48}	2308^{105}
3rd place, bronze medalist(s)	Jonathan Hammond	Scotland	398	371	391	1160^{54}	2308^{104}
3rd place, bronze medalist(s)	Neil Stirton	Scotland	395	372	381	1148^{50}	2308^{104}
4	Hadafi Jaafar	Malaysia	389	371	386	1146^{44}	2289^{84}
4	Mohd Abdul Halim	Malaysia	383	377	383	1143^{40}	2289^{84}
5	Benjamin Burge	Australia	390	360	390	1140^{47}	2277^{86}
5	William Godward	Australia	394	371	372	1137^{19}	2277^{86}
6	Taufick Khan	Bangladesh	393	374	380	1147^{40}	2277^{83}
6	Ramjan Ali	Bangladesh	388	372	370	1130^{43}	2277^{83}
–	Carlos Yon	Saint Helena	–	–	–	DNS	DNS
–	Cyril Leo	Saint Helena	–	–	–	DNS	DNS
