= Synchronised swimming at the 2010 Commonwealth Games – Women's solo =

The women's solo synchronized swimming event at the 2010 Commonwealth Games was held on 6 and 7 October, at the SPM Swimming Pool Complex. Eight soloists competed. There were two rounds of competition, with the preliminary round consisting of a technical routine and a free routine.

== Results ==
Rank	Country	Athlete	Technical	Free	Total
1st place, gold medalist(s)	Canada	Marie-Pier Boudreau Gagnon	47.667	47.667	95.334
2nd place, silver medalist(s)	England	Jenna Randall	44.583	45.417	90.000
3rd place, bronze medalist(s)	Scotland	Lauren Smith	39.917	39.584	80.084
4	Australia	Tarren Otte	39.334	39.584	78.918
5	Malaysia	Katrina Abdul Hadi	39.417	39.500	78.917
6	Singapore	Renyi Lee	37.250	38.417	75.667
7	New Zealand	Kirstin Anderson	36.167	36.667	72.834
8	India	Avani Dave	26.000	26.417	52.417
