= Swimming at the 2010 Commonwealth Games – Women's 50 metre butterfly =

The Women's 50 metre butterfly event at the 2010 Commonwealth Games took place on 4 and 5 October 2010, at the SPM Swimming Pool Complex.

Four heats were held, with most containing the maximum number of swimmers (eight). The top sixteen times qualified for the semi-finals and, the top eight from there qualified for the finals.

== Heats ==
=== Heat 1 ===
Rank	Lane	Name	Nationality	Time	Notes
1	7	Monica Bernardo	Mozambique	29.58	Q
2	1	Shubha Chittaranjan	India	29.96	Q
3	3	Ajaykumar Hanka	Kenya	33.62	
4	5	Mariam Foum	Tanzania	34.29	
5	6	Anham Salyani	Kenya	34.48	
6	4	Aishath Abdulla	Maldives	36.43	
7	8	Karin O´Reilly	Antigua and Barbuda	37.86	
8	2	Aminath Shahid	Maldives	38.19	

=== Heat 2 ===
Rank	Lane	Name	Nationality	Time	Notes
1	4	Emily Seebohm	Australia	26.52	Q
2	5	Katerine Savard	Canada	27.10	Q
3	3	Louise Pate	Scotland	27.45	Q
4	2	Bethany Carson	Northern Ireland	28.90	Q
5	7	Sylvia Brunlehner	Kenya	31.61	
6	8	Mercedes Milner	Zambia	31.93	
7	1	Shannon Austin	Seychelles	32.76	
	6	Anna Schegoleva	Cyprus		DNS

=== Heat 3 ===
Rank	Lane	Name	Nationality	Time	Notes
1	4	Marieke Guehrer	Australia	26.64	Q
2	3	Hayley Palmer	New Zealand	27.16	Q
3	5	Amy Smith	England	27.25	Q
4	6	Audrey Lacroix	Canada	27.49	Q
5	2	Alys Thomas	Wales	28.41	Q
6	7	Pooja Alva	India	30.30	
7	1	Alexia Royal-Eatmon	Jamaica	31.09	
8	8	Elaine Reyes	Gibraltar	31.31	

=== Heat 4 ===
Rank	Lane	Name	Nationality	Time	Notes
1	5	Francesca Halsall	England	26.69	Q
2	4	Yolane Kukla	Australia	27.06	Q
3	3	Ellen Gandy	England	27.07	Q
4	6	Jemma Lowe	Wales	27.45	Q
5	2	MacKenzie Downing	Canada	27.54	Q
6	7	Siona Huxley	Saint Lucia	31.01	
7	1	Kathryn Millin	Swaziland	31.14	
8	8	Judith Meauri	Papua New Guinea	31.91	

== Semifinals ==
=== Semifinal 1 ===
Rank	Lane	Name	Nationality	Time	Notes
1	4	Marieke Guehrer	Australia	26.07	Q, CGR
2	5	Yolane Kukla	Australia	26.22	Q
3	3	Katerine Savard	Canada	26.96	Q
4	2	Jemma Lowe	Wales	27.02	Q
5	7	MacKenzie Downing	Canada	27.12	Q
6	6	Amy Smith	England	27.23	
7	1	Bethany Carson	Northern Ireland	28.94	
8	8	Shubha Chittaranjan	India	30.00	

=== Semifinal 2 ===
Rank	Lane	Name	Nationality	Time	Notes
1	5	Francesca Halsall	England	26.33	Q
2	4	Emily Seebohm	Australia	26.62	Q
3	3	Ellen Gandy	England	27.14	Q
3	6	Hayley Palmer	New Zealand	27.14	
5	2	Louise Pate	Scotland	27.49	
6	7	Audrey Lacroix	Canada	27.68	
7	1	Alys Thomas	Wales	28.20	
8	8	Monica Bernardo	Mozambique	29.75	

== Final ==
Rank	Lane	Name	Nationality	Time	Notes
1st place, gold medalist(s)	3	Francesca Halsall	England	26.24	
2nd place, silver medalist(s)	4	Marieke Guehrer	Australia	26.27	
3rd place, bronze medalist(s)	6	Emily Seebohm	Australia	26.29	
4	5	Yolane Kukla	Australia	26.41	
5	8	Ellen Gandy	England	26.80	
6	7	Jemma Lowe	Wales	27.15	
7	2	Katerine Savard	Canada	27.21	
8	1	MacKenzie Downing	Canada	27.42	
