= Athletics at the 2010 Commonwealth Games – Men's hammer throw =

Men's hammer throw at the Commonwealth Games

The Men's hammer throw at the 2010 Commonwealth Games as part of the athletics programme was held at the Jawaharlal Nehru Stadium on Friday 8 October 2010.

== Records ==
World Record	86.74	Yuriy Sedykh	URS	Stuttgart, Germany	30 August 1986
Games Record	77.53	Stuart Rendell	AUS	Melbourne, Australia	24 March 2006

== Results ==
Rank	Athlete	1	2	3	4	5	6	Result	Notes
1st place, gold medalist(s)	Chris Harmse (RSA)	71.69	x	x	72.71	68.68	73.15	73.15	
2nd place, silver medalist(s)	Alex Smith (ENG)	70.70	72.95	72.91	72.33	72.13	x	72.95	PB
3rd place, bronze medalist(s)	Mike Floyd (ENG)	x	68.79	69.34	x	67.18	64.05	69.34	
4	Andrew Frost (SCO)	x	x	65.56	69.08	x	68.07	69.08	
5	Simon Wardhaugh (AUS)	64.27	x	63.89	64.23	68.15	67.20	68.15	
6	Mark Dry (SCO)	67.07	66.81	65.58	67.26	x	67.41	67.41	
7	Timothy Driesen (AUS)	65.64	x	66.28	62.78	x	66.67	66.67	
8	Petros Sofianos (CYP)	63.20	63.83	64.98	65.21	64.30	64.79	65.21	
9	Chandrodaya Singh (IND)	63.89	63.57	64.20				64.20	
10	Matthew Lambley (ENG)	x	x	62.95				62.95	
11	Kamalpreet Singh (IND)	x	61.00	58.26				61.00	
12	Matthew Richards (WAL)	60.52	x	58.49				60.52	
13	Michael Letterlough (CAY)	54.48	x	54.15				54.48	
