= Shooting at the 2010 Commonwealth Games – Men's trap pairs =

The Men's trap pairs event of the 2010 Commonwealth Games took place on 8 October 2010, at the CRPF Campus.

== Results ==
Rank	Name	Country	Round 1	Round 2	Round 3	Round 4	Indi. total	Total
1st place, gold medalist(s)	Michael Diamond	Australia	25	25	25	25	100^{0}	198^{0}(GR)
1st place, gold medalist(s)	Adam Vella	Australia	24	24	25	25	98^{0}	198^{0}(GR)
2nd place, silver medalist(s)	Mansher Singh	India	25	24	25	25	99^{0}	197^{0}
2nd place, silver medalist(s)	Manavjit Sandhu	India	23	25	25	25	98^{0}	197^{0}
3rd place, bronze medalist(s)	Aaron Heading	England	25	25	24	25	99^{0}	193^{0}
3rd place, bronze medalist(s)	Dave Kirk	England	24	22	24	24	94^{0}	193^{0}
4	John Macdonald	Scotland	25	25	22	24	96^{0}	190^{0}
4	Ossie McLean	Scotland	24	23	22	25	94^{0}	190^{0}
5	Myles Browne-Cole	New Zealand	24	25	24	22	95^{0}	189^{0}
5	Allan Sinclair	New Zealand	24	22	23	25	94^{0}	189^{0}
6	Yiannis Ailiotis	Cyprus	24	24	25	22	95^{0}	188^{0}
6	Leontios Leontiou	Cyprus	22	22	23	24	91^{0}	188^{0}
7	Wung Lee	Singapore	24	24	23	24	95^{0}	186^{0}
7	Mohd Amat	Singapore	22	22	23	24	91^{0}	186^{0}
8	Mike Wixey	Wales	24	23	23	25	95^{0}	185^{0}
8	Scott Morgan	Wales	23	23	20	24	90^{0}	185^{0}
9	David Beattie	Northern Ireland	24	25	22	24	95^{0}	185^{0}
9	Mervyn Morrison	Northern Ireland	25	22	20	23	90^{0}	185^{0}
10	Bernard Yeoh	Malaysia	22	24	25	23	94^{0}	185^{0}
10	Seong Chen	Malaysia	23	21	24	23	91^{0}	185^{0}
11	Neil Parsons	Isle of Man	24	23	25	23	95^{0}	185^{0}
11	David Walton	Isle of Man	23	23	23	21	90^{0}	185^{0}
12	Jason Aquilina	Malta	23	21	22	24	90^{0}	180^{0}
12	Nazzareno Attard	Malta	21	23	24	22	90^{0}	180^{0}
13	Drew Shaw	Canada	22	24	22	24	92^{0}	177^{0}
13	Paul Shaw	Canada	19	23	22	21	85^{0}	177^{0}
14	Kevin Cowles	Gibraltar	22	23	23	24	92^{0}	176^{0}
14	Gary Cooper	Gibraltar	22	22	18	23	84^{0}	176^{0}
15	Saul Pitaluga	Falkland Islands	20	19	21	23	83^{0}	154^{0}
15	Bono McKay	Falkland Islands	18	21	19	13	71^{0}	154^{0}
16	Clayton Viliamu	Niue	14	18	20	15	67^{0}	123^{0}
16	San Talagi	Niue	15	16	5	20	56^{0}	123^{0}
