= Shooting at the 2010 Commonwealth Games – Men's trap singles =

The Men's trap singles event at the 2010 Commonwealth Games took place on 10 October 2010, at the CRPF Campus. There was a qualification held to determine the final participants.

== Results ==
Rank	Name	Country	1	2	3	4	5	Final	Total
1st place, gold medalist(s)	Aaron Heading	England	25	25	24	24	25	24	147 (FGR)
2nd place, silver medalist(s)	Michael Diamond	Australia	24	24	24	25	25	24	146
3rd place, bronze medalist(s)	Manavjit Sandhu	India	24	24	24	25	25	24	144^{+2}
4	Adam Vella	Australia	24	25	25	23	24	21	144^{+1}
5	Robert Auerbach	Trinidad and Tobago	25	23	23	24	25	18	138
6	Mansher Singh	India	25	24	25	24	23	16	137
