= Cycling at the 2010 Commonwealth Games – Men's points race =

The men's point race at the 2010 Commonwealth Games in New Delhi, India took place on 6 October 2010 at the Indira Gandhi Arena. Two qualification heats were held to determine the participants in the final.

== Final ==
Rank	Name	Sprint Points	Extra Laps	Total Points
1st place, gold medalist(s)	Cameron Meyer (AUS)	29	3	89
2nd place, silver medalist(s)	George Atkins (ENG)	12	2	52
3rd place, bronze medalist(s)	Mark Christian (IOM)	17	1	37
4	Sam Harrison (WAL)	17	1	37
5	Aaron Gate (NZL)	24		24
6	Evan Oliphant (SCO)	3	1	23
7	Martyn Irvine (NIR)	13		13
8	Muhamad Othman (MAS)	11		11
9	Peter Latham (NZL)	8		8
10	Dean Edwards (RSA)	7		7
11	Luke Durbridge (AUS)	3		3
12	Mohd Salleh (MAS)	3		3
13	Erick Rowsell (ENG)	1		1
14	Darren Matthews (BAR)	0		0
15	Zach Bell (CAN)	9	+1, −2	−11
16	Simon Yates (ENG)	5	−1	−15
17	Philip Lavery (NIR)	1	−1	−19
–	Christopher Whorrall (IOM)	3	−1	DNF
–	Shane Archbold (NZL)	7	−1	DNF
–	Christoffel van Heerden (RSA)			DNF
–	David Lines (SCO)		−1	DNF
–	James McCallum (SCO)		−2	DNF
–	Jon Mould (WAL)	3	−2	DNF
–	Luke Rowe (WAL)		−2	DNF
