= Martin Brockman =

British athlete

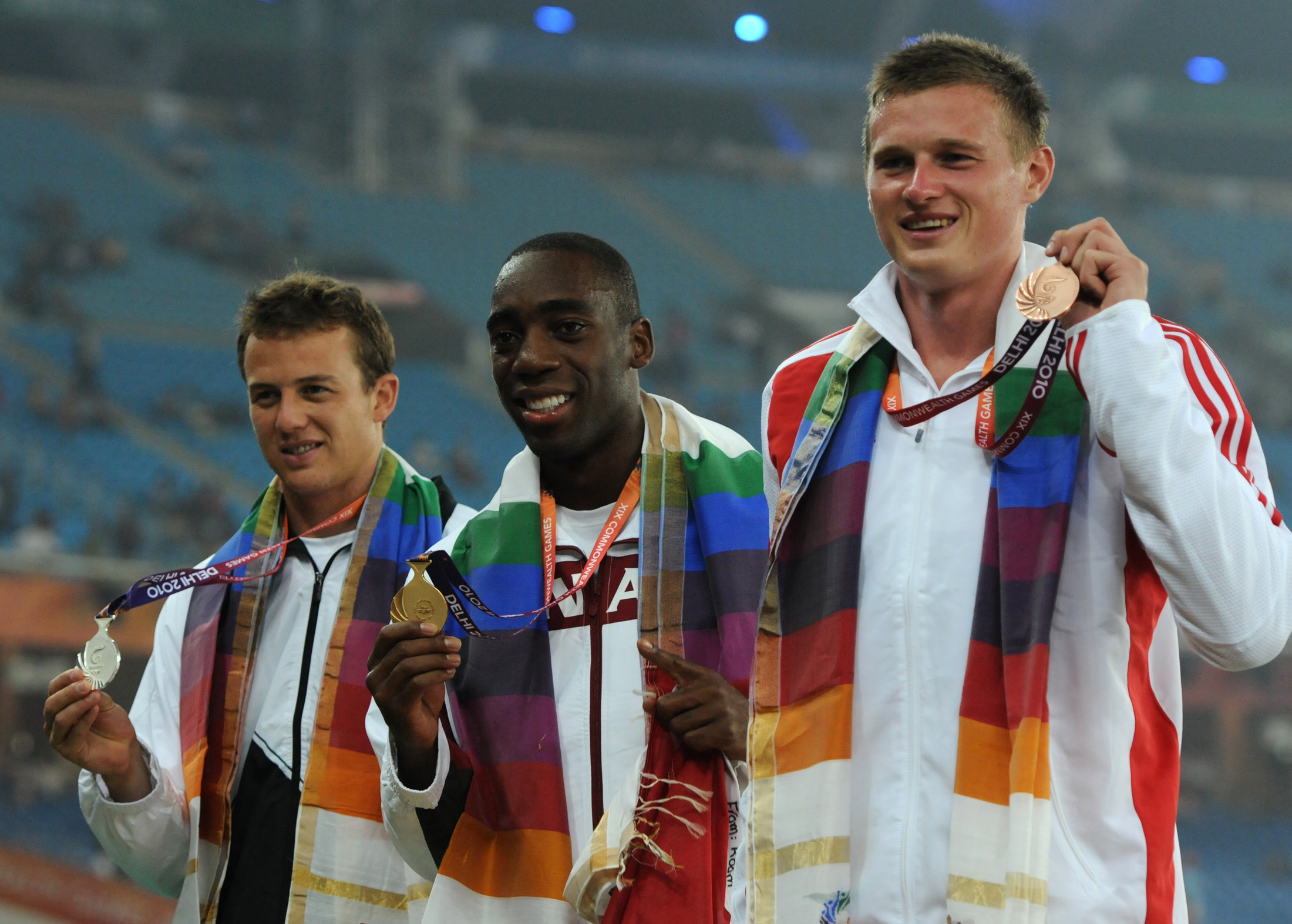
- Brockman on the right

Personal information
- Born: 13 November 1987 (age 38) Maidstone, Kent, England
- Height: 6 ft 6 in (198 cm)

Sport
- Sport: Athletics
- Event: Decathlon
Medal record
Representing England
Commonwealth Games
Bronze medal – third place	2010 Delhi	Decathlon

Martin Brockman (born 13 November 1987) is a British former decathlete.

A native of Maidstone, Kent, Brockman was a junior high jumper before converting to decathlon. He secured a bronze medal in decathlon at the 2010 Commonwealth Games in Delhi, with his win in the 1,500 metre race enough to edge teammate Ben Hazell for the last podium place. After failing to make the 2012 Olympic team, Brockman competed at the 2014 Commonwealth Games in Glasgow, where he came 13th in the decathlon.
