= Richard Brickell =

British sports shooter (born 1975)

Richard Brickell (born 29 October 1975 in Newbury, Berkshire, England) is a sport shooter who represented Great Britain at the 2004 Summer Olympics and the 2012 Summer Olympics and 2010 Commonwealth Games in Delhi where he won both individual gold and bronze medals in the pairs event.

At the 2004 Summer Olympics in Athens he participated in the men's skeet event, finishing tied for 34th position. At the 2012 Summer Olympics in London he also participated in the men's skeet event. This time he finished in 12th position.
