= Joe Roebuck =

British swimmer

Medal record

Men's swimming

Representing United Kingdom

European Championships (SC)
Bronze medal – third place	2011 Szczecin	200 m butterfly

Representing England

Commonwealth Games
Silver medal – second place	2010 Delhi	200 m Individual Medley
Silver medal – second place	2010 Delhi	400 m Individual Medley

Joseph Peter "Joe" Roebuck (born 5 June 1985 in Rotherham, South Yorkshire, England) is an English swimmer.

As of 2012, Roebuck is 1.88 metres (6 ft 2 in) tall and weighs 78 kilograms (172 lb). He is coached by Ian Armiger at Loughborough University, where he also studies Sports Science.

At the 2005 British Swimming Championships Roebuck won a silver medal in both the 200 and 400 metres individual medleys; in 2006 he took gold in both of the medley events and also won gold in the 200 metres butterfly. In 2007 he retained his butterfly and 400 metres medley titles but took silver in the 200 metres medley. In the 2008 Championships Roebuck won a bronze medal in the 400 metres medley and silver in the 200 metres butterfly.

Roebuck missed out on qualification for the 2008 Summer Olympics in Beijing, China, when he missed the required qualifying time by a quarter of a second at the Olympic Trials.

In 2009, he finished 4th in the men's 400 m individual medley at the European Short Course Championship, setting a new British record despite tearing his swimsuit.

In 2010 Roebuck won a bronze medal in the 200 metres individual relay at the 2010 European Aquatics Championships in Budapest, Hungary; defending champion László Cseh won gold and Markus Rogan the silver. Later in the year he represented England at the 2010 Commonwealth Games, held in Delhi, India. Competing in the 400 metres individual medley he won a silver medal behind South Africa's Chad le Clos. Roebuck won his second silver medal of the Games in the 200 metres individual medley; he finished in a time of one minute 59.86 seconds as compatriot James Goddard won the race in one minute 58.10 seconds.

At the 2011 European Short Course Swimming Championships in Eindhoven, Netherlands, Roebuck won the bronze medal in the 200 metres butterfly.

At the 2012 British Championships Roebuck won the silver medal, behind fellow Loughborough University student Roberto Pavoni in the 400 metres individual medley. This meant he qualified to take part in the event at the 2012 Summer Olympics in London. He went on to win gold medals in the 200 metres butterfly and 200 metres individual medley, earning himself Olympic qualification for both events.

In June 2012 Roebuck was confirmed as part of a 44-swimmer squad for Great Britain at the 2012 Summer Olympics; he competed in the 200 metres butterfly, 200 metres individual medley and the 400 metres individual medley. His best result was reaching the semi-final in the men's 200 m individual medley.

At the 2014 Commonwealth Games, he competed in the 100 and 200 m butterfly and the 200 m individual medley.
