= Clive Bramley =

British sport shooter

Clive Bramley is a sport shooter who represented Great Britain at the 2010 Commonwealth Games in Delhi where he won bronze medal in the Skeet pairs event.
