= Richard Wilson (sport shooter) =

British sports shooter

Personal information
- Full name: Richard Wilson
- Citizenship: British
- Born: 29 August 1964 (age 62)

Sport
- Country: United Kingdom; England
- Sport: Shooting sport
- Event: 50 m prone rifle
- Club: Shanklin Rifle Club
Medal record
Men's shooting
Representing England
Commonwealth Games
Silver medal – second place	2010 Delhi	50m Prone Rifle Pairs

Richard Wilson is a British sport shooter specialising in the ISSF 50 meter rifle prone event. He won a silver medal at the 2010 Commonwealth Games in Delhi in the Men's 50m rifle prone pairs event, representing England alongside Mike Babb.

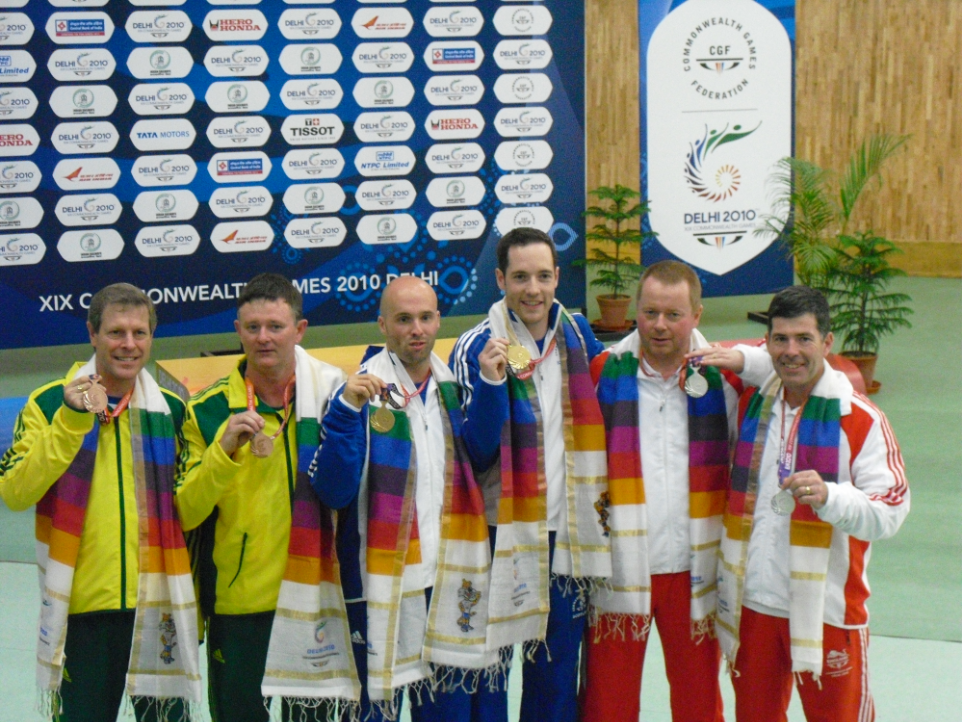
Babb and Wilson (right) win silver in the Men's Prone Rifle Pairs

Wilson has won the British Prone Rifle Championship twice, first in 2016 and again in 2026 following a three-way tie shoot.

He represented Great Britain at the 2009 European Shooting Championships in Osijek, Croatia. He finished 17th in the men's Prone Rifle.

At the 2012 Commonwealth Shooting Federation (European Division) Championships on the Isle of Man, Wilson won the Men's Prone Rifle event.

Wilson has represented England in domestic Home Countries matches numerous times.
