= Gagan Narang =

Indian sport shooter

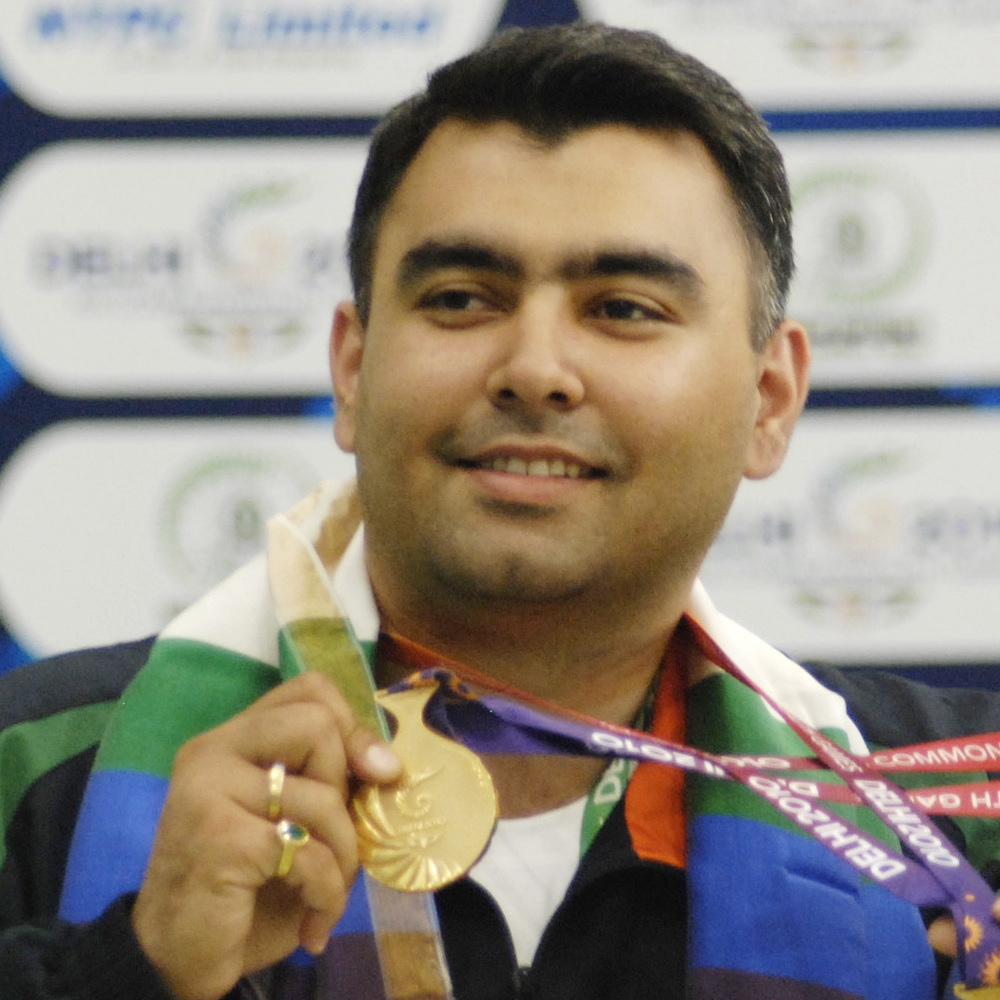
- Narang winning Gold at the 2010 Commonwealth Games

Personal information
- Nationality: Indian
- Born: 6 May 1983 (age 43) Madras, Tamil Nadu
- Occupation: Rifle shooting
Medal record
Men's shooting
Representing India
Olympic Games
Bronze medal – third place	2012 London	10 m air rifle
World Championships
Bronze medal – third place	2010 Munich	10 m air rifle
Asian Games
Silver medal – second place	2010 Guangzhou	10 m air rifle
Silver medal – second place	2010 Guangzhou	10 m air rifle team
Bronze medal – third place	2006 Doha	10 m air rifle team
Bronze medal – third place	2006 Doha	50 m rifle 3 positions
Bronze medal – third place	2006 Doha	50 m rifle 3 positions team
Asian Championships
Gold medal – first place	2007 Kuwait City	10 m air rifle team
Gold medal – first place	2012 Doha	50 m rifle 3 positions team
Silver medal – second place	2007 Kuwait City	50 m rifle prone
Silver medal – second place	2007 Kuwait City	50 m rifle prone team
Silver medal – second place	2012 Doha	10 m air rifle team
Bronze medal – third place	2007 Kuwait City	50 m rifle 3 positions team
Bronze medal – third place	2012 Doha	50 m rifle 3 positions
Commonwealth Games
Gold medal – first place	2006 Melbourne	10m air rifle
Gold medal – first place	2006 Melbourne	10m air rifle pairs
Gold medal – first place	2006 Melbourne	50m rifle 3 positions
Gold medal – first place	2006 Melbourne	50m rifle 3 positions pairs
Gold medal – first place	2010 Delhi	10m air rifle
Gold medal – first place	2010 Delhi	10m air rifle pairs
Gold medal – first place	2010 Delhi	50m rifle 3 positions
Gold medal – first place	2010 Delhi	50m rifle 3 positions pairs
Silver medal – second place	2014 Glasgow	50m rifle prone
Bronze medal – third place	2014 Glasgow	50m rifle 3 positions
Commonwealth Championships
Gold medal – first place	2005 Melbourne	10 m air rifle
Gold medal – first place	2005 Melbourne	10 m air rifle pairs
Gold medal – first place	2010 Delhi	10 m air rifle
Gold medal – first place	2010 Delhi	10 m air rifle pairs
Gold medal – first place	2010 Delhi	10 m air rifle badge
Gold medal – first place	2010 Delhi	50 m rifle 3 positions pairs
Gold medal – first place	2010 Delhi	50 m rifle prone pairs
Gold medal – first place	2010 Delhi	50 m rifle prone badge
Silver medal – second place	2005 Melbourne	10 m air rifle badge
Silver medal – second place	2010 Delhi	50 m rifle 3 positions
Silver medal – second place	2010 Delhi	50 m rifle prone
Silver medal – second place	2017 Brisbane	50 m rifle prone

Gagan Narang (born 6 May 1983) is an Indian sport shooter, supported by the Olympic Gold Quest. He won the bronze medal in the Men's 10 m Air Rifle Event at the 2012 Summer Olympics in London with a final score of 701.1 on 30 July 2012. He was also a member of prestigious Padma award committee 2023.

== Early life and background ==
Gagan was born to Bhimsen Narang and his wife Amarjit, in a Punjabi Hindu Arora family in Chennai on 6 May 1983. His father is a retired chief manager of the Air India. Gagan's family hail from the Simla Gujran village of Haryana's Panipat district. However, his father's job assignments made them to shift from Panipat to Hyderabad, where he was brought up. He did his schooling from the Gitanjali Senior School. He attained his Bachelor of Computer Application degree from the Hyderabad's Osmania University. He took to shooting when his father presented him an air pistol in 1997. He went about perfecting his shooting skills at the backyard of his home in Begumpet. According to his father, Gagan showed early sparks of his shooting ability when, at the age of two, he shot a balloon with a toy pistol.

== Career ==
Narang won a gold medal in the Afro Asian games, 2003 in Hyderabad on 26 October 2003 in Men's 10m air rifle competition. He won the Air Rifle Gold medal at the World Cup 2006 and followed it up with win in the event in April 2010.

In a pre-Olympic event in Hannover, Germany, Gagan shot an Air Rifle score higher than the world record, 704.3 as opposed to 703.1 set by Thomas Farnik of Austria in the World Cup 2006. Gagan Narang won 4 Gold medals at 2006 Commonwealth Games.

Narang qualified for the 2008 ISSF World Cup Final after he won a gold in the World Cup in China earlier in 2008. Gagan shot a perfect 600 in the qualification round. He scored 103.5 in the final round making total score of 703.5 to gain the universe record. On 4 November 2008, he broke Austria's Thomas Farnik's record, set in the 2006 World Cup final in Granada, Spain. Gagan said his win was special because Barack Obama, who won the United States' Presidential election on same day, was a source of inspiration.

Narang added 4 Gold medals to the Indian tally at the 2010 Commonwealth Games in New Delhi. In the Men's 10 m Air Rifle singles event, he shot a perfect 600 which was a new record. Gagan also clinched a silver medal in his pet event at the Asian Games 2010. He also combined with Abhinav Bindra and Sanjeev Rajput to win the country another silver, in the team event behind champions, China. He won both of his silvers on the opening day of Asian Games.

Narang won the bronze medal in the 10m air rifle event at the 2012 London Olympics with a total score of 701.1 becoming India's first medal winner at the 2012 games. This win made his only the 3rd shooter from India to medal at the Olympics. Gagan was just behind the silver medallist Niccolo Campriani of Italy who scored 701.5, while the gold medallist Alin George Moldoveanu of Romania was at 702.1. However he failed to qualify for the finals of the men's 50-metre rifle three positions at the Royal Artillery Barracks.

Narang won 1 silver medal and 1 bronze medal in 50-metre rifle prone and 50-metre rifle 3 position respectively at the 2014 Commonwealth Games in Glasgow.

== ISSF World Medal Tally ==
No.	Event	Championship	Year	Place	Medal
1	10m air rifle	ISSF World Shooting Championships	2010	Munich	3rd place, bronze medalist(s)
3	50m rifle 3 Positions	ISSF World Cup	2009	Changwon	1st place, gold medalist(s)
4	10m air rifle	ISSF World Cup	2009	Changwon	3rd place, bronze medalist(s)
5	10m air rifle	ISSF World Cup Final	2008	Bangkok	1st place, gold medalist(s)
6	10m air rifle	ISSF World Cup	2008	Beijing	3rd place, bronze medalist(s)
7	10m air rifle	ISSF World Cup	2006	Guangzhou	1st place, gold medalist(s)

== World record ==
Current world records held in 10 m Air Rifle
Men	Qualification	600	Tevarit Majchacheep (THA); Denis Sokolov (RUS); Gagan Narang (IND); Gagan Narang (IND); Zhu Qinan (CHN)	January 27, 2000; March 1, 2008; May 5, 2008; May 16, 2008; September 22, 2011	Langkawi (MAS); Winterthur (SUI); Bangkok (THA); New Delhi (IND); Wrocław (POL)

== Controversy ==
In August 2010, Narang had publicly expressed his displeasure after being ignored for the prestigious Rajiv Gandhi Khel Ratna award thrice and he threatened to skip the 2010 Commonwealth Games due to lack of motivation. However, intense pressure from his family and fans, he later decided to participate.

== Summer Olympics ==
Year	Event	Rank
2004 Athens	10 m air rifle	12
2008 Beijing	10 m air rifle	9
2008 Beijing	50 m rifle Prone	35
2008 Beijing	50 m rifle three positions	13
2012 London	10 m air rifle	3rd place, bronze medalist(s)
2012 London	50 m rifle prone	18
2012 London	50 m rifle three positions	20
2016 Rio	10 m air rifle	23
2016 Rio	50 m rifle prone	13
2016 Rio	50 m rifle three positions	33

== Awards & Recognitions ==
In recognition with his achievements, Narang was conferred with the Padma Shree Award in 2011. Gagan Narang was selected for the prestigious Rajiv Gandhi Khel Ratna award for 2010. This is the highest sports award in the country. He was conferred the award by then president Pratibha Patil on 29 August 2011. Also Gagan Narang was invited by the organisers of the Indian Grand Prix to wave the chequered flag in the 2012 Indian Grand Prix.

Awards for 2012 Olympics Bronze medal

- ₹10 million (US$100,000) cash prize by State Government of Haryana.
- ₹5 million (US$52,000) cash prize by the State Government of Andhra Pradesh.
- ₹5 million (US$52,000) cash prize by the State Government of Rajasthan.
- ₹2 million (US$21,000) cash prize by Steel Ministry of India.
- 2 kg of gold by Sahara India Pariwar.
