= Reiss Beckford =

Jamaican gymnast (born 1992)

- Born: 17 February 1992 (age 34) Enfield, London, England
- Height: 5 ft 8 in (173 cm)

Gymnastics career
- Discipline: Men's artistic gymnastics
- Country represented: Jamaica
- Former countries represented: (United Kingdom) Great Britain; England
- Club: South Essex Gymnastics Club
- Head coach: Scott Hann (personal)
Medal record
Commonwealth Games
Silver medal – second place	2010 Delhi	Team
Silver medal – second place	2010 Delhi	All-Around
Silver medal – second place	2010 Delhi	Floor

Reiss Beckford (born 17 February 1992) is a Jamaican gymnast. Prior to 2015, Beckford competed for England and Great Britain.

== Gymnatsics career ==
In October 2010 he was part of the team that won the silver medal for England in the gymnastics in the men's artistic all-around team event at the 2010 Commonwealth Games. He also won the silver medal in the men's individual all-around event and a silver medal in the men's floor event at the same games.

Born in England with a Jamaican father, Beckford announced his decision to switch allegiance to Jamaica, a move considered likely to increase his chances of qualification for the Olympic Games in Rio in 2016.

Beckford competed at the 2015 World Gymnastics Championships in Glasgow. He and his two teammates were the first Jamaican men to do this. He did not qualify for any finals but placed high enough to qualify a Jamaican man to the Rio Test Event in April 2016 to try to qualify for the Olympic Games. However Beckford was unable to take this place at the qualifying event himself because the rules state a gymnast must not have competed for another country in the past three years. Beckford last represented Great Britain in 2014.

== See also ==
- Nationality changes in gymnastics
