= Tobias Oriwol =

Canadian swimmer

Personal information
- Full name: Tobias Oriwol
- National team: Canada
- Born: May 13, 1985 (age 41) Westmount, Quebec
- Height: 1.95 m (6 ft 5 in)
- Weight: 85 kg (187 lb)

Sport
- Sport: Swimming
- Strokes: Backstroke
- Club: Toronto Swim Club

Tobias Oriwol (born May 13, 1985) is a Canadian backstroke swimmer who competed in two consecutive Summer Olympics in 2008 and 2012.

Tobias swam in the semifinals of the men's 200-metre backstroke at the 2008 Summer Olympics in Beijing, and afterward retired to focus on his urban planning degree from Harvard University. He returned to competition in 2010 and qualified to compete at the 2012 Summer Olympics in London, and again advanced to the semifinals of his signature 200-metre event. He also swam in the preliminary heats of the 4x200-metre freestyle relay as a member of the Canadian team in that event.
