= Stevan Walton =

English sport shooter (born 1985)

Medal record

Shooting

Representing England

Commonwealth Games
Gold medal – first place	2010 Delhi	Men's double trap singles
Gold medal – first place	2010 Delhi	Men's double trap pairs

Stevan Walton (born 23 April 1985 in Bromsgrove) is a shooter from Redditch who won a gold medal in Commonwealth Games held from 3–14 October 2010 in Delhi, India. He won, with Steven Scott, the men's double trap pairs event on 6 October 2010.

Walton was introduced to shooting by his godfather, who owned a shooting ground. From here he participated in county shooting and then advanced to national shooting.
