= Kenneth Parr =

British sport shooter

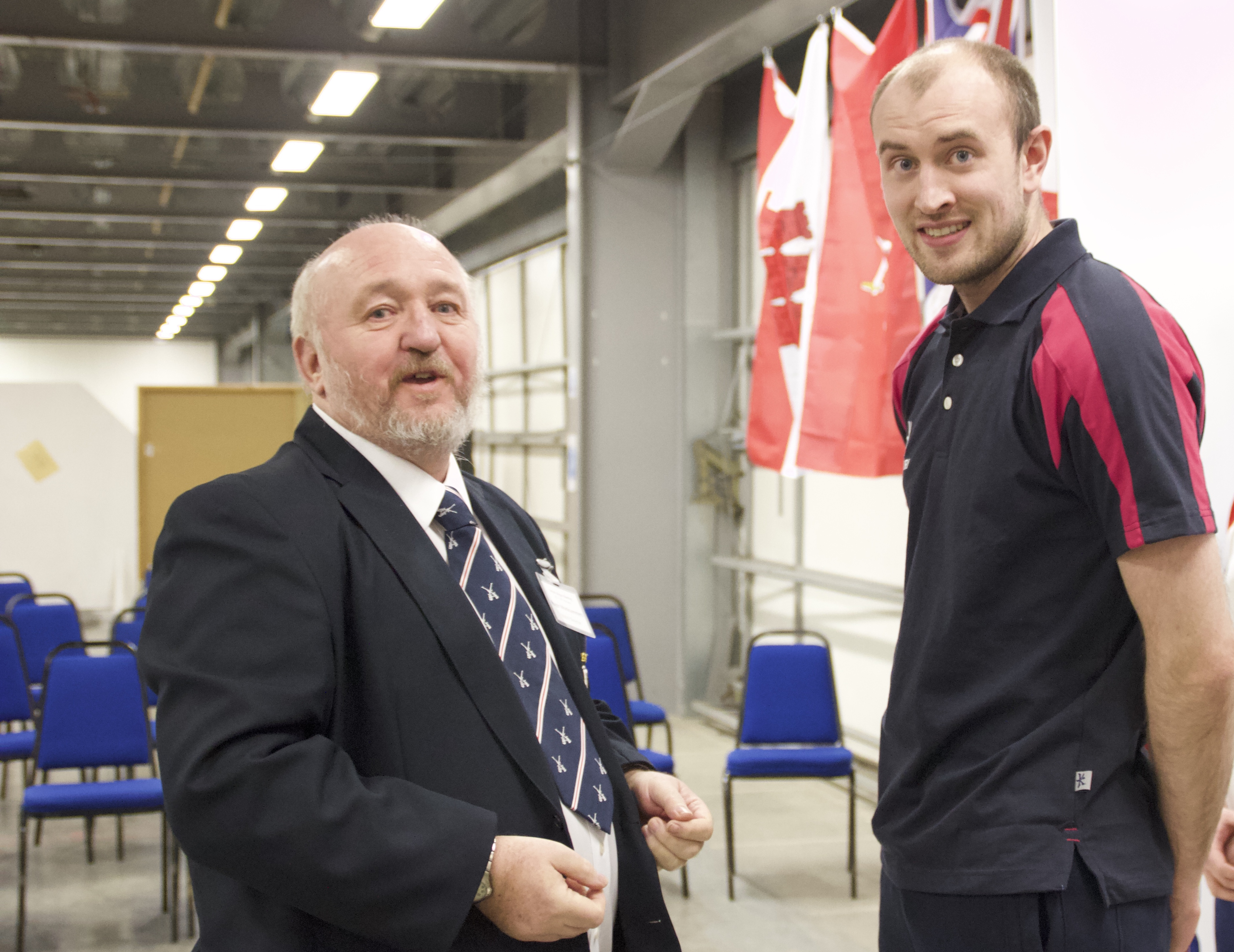
- Kenneth Parr (right) wins Bronze at 2014 British Air Gun Championship

Personal information
- Nicknames: Kenny, Ken Jr
- Nationality: United Kingdom
- Born: 3 October 1988 (age 37) Westminster, England
- Height: 6 ft 0 in (183 cm)
- Weight: 75 kg (165 lb)

Sport
- Country: England
- Sport: Sport shooter
Medal record
Men's shooting
Representing Great Britain
World Championships
Gold medal – first place	2008 Granada	50m Rifle Prone Junior Team
World Cup
Silver medal – second place	2016 Baku	50m Rifle Prone
European Shooting Championships
Bronze medal – third place	2019 Bologna	50m Rifle Prone Mixed Team
Representing England
Commonwealth Games
Silver medal – second place	2010 New Delhi	Men's 50 metre rifle three positions pairs
Silver medal – second place	2010 New Delhi	Men's 10 metre air rifle pairs
Bronze medal – third place	2014 Glasgow	50 metre rifle prone
Bronze medal – third place	2018 Gold Coast	50 metre rifle prone

Kenneth Parr (born 3 October 1988) is a male British sport shooter who has medalled at three Commonwealth Games. In 2016, he won a silver medal at the ISSF World Cup in Baku.

== Sport shooting career ==
In 2006, Parr was selected to represent Great Britain at the World Championships in Zagreb. Teammate Matthew Thomson became junior world champion in the 50m prone rifle event, and together with Richard Phillips, the three won the junior men's team event.

In April 2007, Parr set a new British junior record in the 50 meter rifle three positions event at the ISCH Meeting in Hannover.

Parr has competed for England in three consecutive Commonwealth Games. He won two silver medals at the 2010 Commonwealth Games in Delhi, in the 50 metre rifle three positions pairs and Men's 10 metre air rifle pairs with James Huckle. Four years later he won a bronze medal in the 50 metre rifle prone event at the 2014 Commonwealth Games.

In 2016, he won a silver medal in the Men's 50m Prone Rifle event at the Baku World Cup. This qualified him for the World Cup Final in Bologna where he finished seventh.

At the 2018 Commonwealth Games, he won a second bronze medal in Men's 50m Prone Rifle.

In 2019, with teammate Seonaid McIntosh, Kenneth won Bronze in the 50m rifle mixed team event at the European Championships in Bologna.

== Personal life ==
He is the son of the two times Commonwealth Games medallist Ken Parr (sport shooter).
