= Gary Duff =

Irish sports shooter

Personal information
- Nationality: Irish
- Born: 14 February 1967 (age 58)

Sport
- Sport: Sports shooting

Gary Duff (born 14 February 1967) is a Northern Irish sports shooter who has represented both the Republic of Ireland and Great Britain in international competition. He competed in the men's 50 metre rifle prone event at the 1996 Summer Olympics.
