= Commonwealth Games England =

Sporting association

- Category: Commonwealth Games Association
- Abbreviation: CGE
- Headquarters: London
- Location: Albert Embankment; SE1 7TY
- President: Laura Kenny
- Chairman: John Steele
- CEO: Mark Osikoya
- Replaced: Commonwealth Games Council for England

Official website
- teamengland.org
- (England)

Commonwealth Games England (CGE) is the national Commonwealth Games Association for England. The company is responsible for supporting and managing the participation of Team England at the Commonwealth Games'.

== History ==
=== Commonwealth Games Council for England ===
The Commonwealth Games Council for England (CGCE) was originally responsible for 'Team England' and oversaw each team between the 1930 British Empire Games and Melbourne 2006 Commonwealth Games and the England teams at the Commonwealth Youth Games.

Membership of the Games Council consisted of representatives from 26 different sports on the Commonwealth Games' Sports Programme, supported by a small salaried team.

CGCE's president was gold medallist Sir Christopher Chataway, the first winner of the BBC's Sports Personality of the Year award and a teammate of Sir Roger Bannister.

=== Commonwealth Games England ===
Following a review in 2009, the Commonwealth Games Council for England was disbanded and a new organisation, Commonwealth Games England, was established in its place. CGE is governed by a board of non-executive directors, chaired by Ian Metcalfe. The Board is made up of experts from fields including sport, marketing and finance including England hockey player Alex Danson and co-founder of Carphone Warehouse and British Olympic Association non-executive director David Ross and the national director of the English Institute of Sport, Nigel Walker.

Laura Kenny was named as the organization's president in March 2025, succeeding Denise Lewis and becoming CGE's youngest-ever president at the age of 32.

== Funding ==
Since 1994, the costs of the preparation of Team England have been supported with funding from Sport England, a public body that distributes public and lottery funds. The raising of funds for the team's participation in the Games themselves is the sole responsibility of CGE and is raised through sponsorship and fundraising activities.

== Identity ==
In the run-up to the 2010 Commonwealth Games, CGE adopted a new logo and brand identity. The logo features a single red English lion representing strength, power and performance.

== See also ==
- British Olympic Association
- British Paralympic Association
