= Luke Folwell =

British artistic gymnast (born 1987)

- Born: 15 May 1987 (age 39) Northampton, England

Gymnastics career
- Discipline: Men's artistic gymnastics
- Country represented: (United Kingdom) Great Britain; England
- Club: Huntingdon Olympic Club
- Head coach: Paul Hall
Medal record
Representing England
Commonwealth Games
Gold medal – first place	2010 Delhi	Men's Artistic Individual All-Round
Gold medal – first place	2010 Delhi	Men's Vault
Silver medal – second place	2010 Delhi	Men's Rings
Silver medal – second place	2010 Delhi	Men's Parallel Bars
Silver medal – second place	2010 Delhi	Men's artistic team all-around
Bronze medal – third place	2006 Melbourne	Men's Team

Luke Folwell (born 15 May 1987) is a British artistic gymnast and coach from Northampton. In October 2010, he won five medals for England in the gymnastics at the 2010 Commonwealth Games to become the most successful British gymnast in a single Games in Commonwealth Games history. His feat was matched by Max Whitlock in 2014, and Nile Wilson in 2018, and bettered by Welsh rhythmic gymnast Francesca Jones in 2014, who won 6 medals.
