= Neil Stirton =

British sport shooter (born 1981)

Personal information
- National team: Great Britain; Scotland
- Born: 15 February 1981 (age 45) Aberdeen
- Years active: 1996–present

Sport
- Country: United Kingdom
- Sport: Shooting sport
- Events: 50 metre rifle prone; 50 metre rifle three positions; 10 metre air rifle
- Club: Bon Accord
- Coached by: Donald McIntosh
Medal record
Men's shooting
Representing Great Britain
ISSF World Cup
Silver medal – second place	2008 Munich	50 m rifle prone
Representing Scotland
Commonwealth Games
Gold medal – first place	2010 Delhi	50 m rifle prone pairs
Silver medal – second place	2006 Melbourne	50 m rifle prone pairs
Silver medal – second place	2018 Gold Coast	50 m rifle prone
Bronze medal – third place	2010 Delhi	50 m rifle three positions pairs
Commonwealth Championships
Silver medal – second place	2005 Melbourne	50 m rifle prone pairs
Bronze medal – third place	2010 Delhi	50 m rifle three positions pairs
- Updated on 5 August 2025

Neil Stirton (born 1981) is a British sport shooter.

== Career ==
Stirton has held a number of Scottish and British shooting records. In the 2005 Commonwealth Shooting Federation Championships (the test event for the 2006 Melbourne Commonwealth Games), Stirton won Silver in the 50M Rifle Prone Pairs partnering with Martin Sinclair. The pair went on to win Silver in the same event at the 2006 Commonwealth Games. Partnering with Jonathan Hammond at the 2010 Commonwealth Games, Stirton won Gold in the Prone Pairs, and Bronze in the 50M Rifle 3 Positions Pairs.

In 2008, Stirton won the silver medal in the 50M Prone Rifle at the Munich World Cup, where he shot a career personal best and British record of 599 in the Qualification stage. His Silver medal position qualified him for the 2008 World Cup Final where he finished twelfth.
