= 2010 Commonwealth Shooting Championships =

- Host city: New Delhi, India
- Dates: 19–27 February 2010
- Main venue: Dr. Karni Singh Shooting Range

The 2010 Commonwealth Shooting Federation Championships were held at the Dr. Karni Singh Shooting Range in New Delhi, India from 19 to 27 February 2010. They served as a test event for that year's Commonwealth Games despite a four-month postponement necessitated by venue construction delays.

== Medalists ==
Results were as follows:

=== Men ===
==== Pistol ====
Event	Gold	Silver	Bronze
10 m air pistol	Samaresh Jung; India	Zakir Khan; India	Mick Gault; England
10 m air pistol pairs	India; Zakir Khan; Samaresh Jung	England; Mick Gault; Nick Baxter	Australia; Chris Roberts; Alfio Casagrande
10 m air pistol badge	Omkar Singh; India	Zakir Khan; India	Samaresh Jung; India
25 m centre fire pistol	Vijay Kumar; India	Mahender Singh; India	Viraj Singh; India
25 m centre fire pistol pairs	India; Vijay Kumar; Mahender Singh	Wales; Alan Green; Steve Pengelly	England; Mick Gault; Iqbal Ubhi
25 m centre fire pistol badge	Vijay Kumar; India	Mahender Singh; India	Alan Green; Wales
25 m rapid fire pistol	Vijay Kumar; India	Gurpreet Singh; India	Pemba Tamang; India
25 m rapid fire pistol pairs	India; Vijay Kumar; Pemba Tamang	Not awarded (lack of entries)	
25 m rapid fire pistol badge	Vijay Kumar; India	Gurpreet Singh; India	Pemba Tamang; India
25 m standard pistol	Gurpreet Singh; India	Samaresh Jung; India	Vijay Kumar; India
25 m standard pistol pairs	India; Samaresh Jung; Gurpreet Singh	England; Mick Gault; Iqbal Ubhi	Wales; Steve Pengelly; Alan Green
25 m standard pistol badge	Samaresh Jung; India	Vijay Kumar; India	Mick Gault; England
50 m pistol	Amanpreet Singh; India	Mick Gault; England	Viraj Singh; India
50 m pistol pairs	England; Mick Gault; Nick Baxter	India; Bapu Vanzare; Viraj Singh	Australia; Alfio Casagrande; Janek Janski
50 m pistol badge	Amanpreet Singh; India	Mick Gault; England	Nick Baxter; England

==== Rifle ====
Event	Gold	Silver	Bronze
10 m air rifle	Gagan Narang; India	Sanjeev Rajput; India	James Huckle; England
10 m air rifle pairs	India; Gagan Narang; P. T. Raghunath	England; James Huckle; Kenneth Parr	Bangladesh; Md. Asif Hossain Khan; Shovon Chowdhury
10 m air rifle badge	Gagan Narang; India	P. T. Raghunath; India	Md. Asif Hossain Khan; Bangladesh
50 m rifle prone	Warren Potent; Australia	Gagan Narang; India	Thomas Versace; Australia
50 m rifle prone pairs	India; Gagan Narang; Joydeep Karmakar	Australia; Robert Howell; Warren Potent	England; James Huckle; Richard Wilson
50 m rifle prone badge	Gagan Narang; India	Robert Howell; Australia	Matthew Hall; Northern Ireland
50 m rifle 3 positions	Sanjeev Rajput; India	Gagan Narang; India	Imran Hassan Khan; India
50 m rifle 3 positions pairs	India; Sanjeev Rajput; Gagan Narang	England; James Huckle; Kenneth Parr	Scotland; Graham Rudd; Neil Stirton
50 m rifle 3 positions badge	Sanjeev Rajput; India	James Huckle; England	Imran Hassan Khan; India

==== Shotgun ====
Event	Gold	Silver	Bronze
Skeet	Malcolm Allen; Wales	Mairaj Ahmad Khan; India	Arozepal Sandhu; India
Skeet pairs	India; Arozepal Sandhu; Mairaj Ahmad Khan	England; Rory Warlow; Craig Lakey	Bangladesh; Iqbal Islam; Nooruddin Salin
Skeet badge	Michael Wilson; New Zealand	Rory Warlow; England	Arozepal Sandhu; India
Trap	Manavjit Singh Sandhu; India	Aaron Heading; England	Adam Vella; Australia
Trap pairs	Australia; Adam Vella; Michael McNabb	India; Manavjit Singh Sandhu; Birendeep Sodhi	England; Aaron Heading; James Sole
Trap badge	Adam Vella; Australia	Aaron Heading; England	Michael McNabb; Australia
Double trap	Steven Scott; England	Mohammed Asab; India	Vikram Bhatnagar; India
Double trap pairs	India; Mohammed Asab; Vikram Bhatnagar	Australia; Mark Russell; Kirley Nicholas	England; Steven Scott; James Sole
Double trap badge	Mohammed Asab; India	Steven Scott; England	Mark Russell; Australia

=== Women ===
==== Pistol ====
Event	Gold	Silver	Bronze
10 m air pistol	Shweta Chaudhary; India	Annu Raj Singh; India	Pushpanjali Rana; India
10 m air pistol pairs	India; Shweta Chaudhary; Pushpanjali Rana	England; Georgina Geikie; Julia Lydall	Wales; Danielle Jones; Nicola Wilson
10 m air pistol badge	Shweta Chaudhary; India	Annu Raj Singh; India	Georgina Geikie; England
25 m pistol	Anisa Sayyed; India	Annu Raj Singh; India	Linda Ryan; Australia
25 m pistol pairs	India; Anisa Sayyed; Annu Raj Singh	Australia; Linda Ryan; Elena Galiabovitch	England; Georgina Geikie; Julia Lydall
25 m pistol badge	Anisa Sayyed; India	Linda Ryan; Australia	Georgina Geikie; England

==== Rifle ====
Event	Gold	Silver	Bronze
10 m air rifle	Neha Sapte; India	Sharmin Ratna; Bangladesh	Robyn van Nus; Australia
10 m air rifle pairs	Bangladesh; Sharmin Ratna; Sadiya Sultana	India; Priya Aggarwal; Neha Sapte	England; Sheree Cox; Sharon Lee
10 m air rifle badge	Sharmin Ratna; Bangladesh	Sadiya Sultana; Bangladesh	Priya Aggarwal; India
50 m rifle prone	Johanne Brekke; Wales	Kay Copland; Scotland	Robyn van Nus; Australia
50 m rifle prone pairs	Scotland; Jennifer McIntosh; Sheena Sharp	England; Michelle Smith; Sharon Lee	Wales; Johanne Brekke; Helen Warnes
50 m rifle prone badge	Sally Johnston; New Zealand	Birmati; India	Jennifer McIntosh; Scotland
50 m rifle 3 positions	Meena Kumari; India	Lajja Goswami; India	Sharon Lee; England
50 m rifle 3 positions pairs	Scotland; Jennifer McIntosh; Kay Copland	Wales; Jennifer Corish; Sian Corish	India; Lajja Goswami; Tejaswini Sawant
50 m rifle 3 positions badge	Jennifer McIntosh; Scotland	Lajja Goswami; India	Jennifer Corish; Wales

==== Shotgun ====
Event	Gold	Silver	Bronze
Skeet	Elena Allen; Wales	Sian Bruce; Scotland	Cerys Evans; Wales
Skeet pairs	England; Nicki Brocklesby; Pinky Le Grelle	India; Artes Rao; Rashmee Rathore	Wales; Elena Allen; Cerys Evans
Skeet badge	Elena Allen; Wales	Lauren Mark; Australia	Sian Bruce; Scotland
Trap	Kirsty Barr; Northern Ireland	Shreyasi Singh; India	Shona Marshall; Scotland
Trap pairs	England; Anita North; Charlotte Kerwood	Australia; Laetisha Scanlan; Catherine Skinner	Scotland; Shona Marshall; Linda Pearson
Trap badge	Seema Tomar; India	Anita North; England	Kirsty Barr; Northern Ireland

== Medal table ==
* Host nation (India)

Rank	Nation	Gold	Silver	Bronze	Total
1	India*	35	25	14	74
2	England	4	15	13	32
3	Wales	4	2	7	13
4	Australia	3	7	9	19
5	Scotland	3	2	5	10
6	Bangladesh	2	2	3	7
7	New Zealand	2	0	0	2
8	Northern Ireland	1	0	2	3
Totals (8 entries)		54	53	53	160
