= Shooting at the 2010 Commonwealth Games =

- Venue: Dr. Karni Singh Shooting Range; CRPF Campus (Kadarpur)
- Location: Delhi, India
- Dates: 5 to 13 October 2010

Shooting at the 2010 Commonwealth Games was the 11th appearance of Shooting at the Commonwealth Games. The shooting events at the 2010 Commonwealth Games took place at the Dr. Karni Singh Shooting Range in Delhi, India from 5 to 13 October 2010.

The Full Bore events were held at the CRPF Campus (Kadarpur) from 9 to 13 October 2010.

== Medal table ==
* Host nation (India)

Rank	Nation	Gold	Silver	Bronze	Total
1	India*	14	11	5	30
2	England	6	6	7	19
3	Singapore	5	4	5	14
4	Scotland	4	3	2	9
5	Australia	3	5	4	12
6	Malaysia	2	3	3	8
7	Cyprus	1	1	1	3
8	New Zealand	1	1	0	2
9	Canada	0	1	2	3
10	Trinidad and Tobago	0	1	1	2
11	Northern Ireland	0	0	2	2
12	Bangladesh	0	0	1	1
12	Isle of Man	0	0	1	1
12	Namibia	0	0	1	1
12	Wales	0	0	1	1
Totals (15 entries)		36	36	36	108

== Medals by events ==
=== Pistol ===
==== Men's events ====
Event	Gold	Silver	Bronze
10 metre air pistol singles	Omkar Singh; India	Gai Bin; Singapore	Daniel Repacholi; Australia
10 metre air pistol pairs	Omkar Singh; Gurpreet Singh; India	Nick Baxter; Mick Gault; England	Gai Bin; Lim Swee Hon Nigel; Singapore
25 metre centre fire pistol singles	Harpreet Singh; India	Vijay Kumar; India	Lip Poh; Singapore
25 metre centre fire pistol pairs	Vijay Kumar; Harpreet Singh; India	Greg Yelavich; Alan Earle; New Zealand	Gai Bin; Meng Poh; Singapore
25 metre rapid fire pistol singles	Vijay Kumar; India	Hasli Izwan Amir Hasan; Malaysia	Gurpreet Singh; India
25 metre rapid fire pistol pairs	Vijay Kumar; Gurpreet Singh; India	Hafiz Adzha; Hasli Izwan Amir Hasan; Malaysia	David Chapman; Bruce Quick; Australia
25 metre standard pistol singles	Gai Bin; Singapore	Roger Peter Daniel; Trinidad and Tobago	Samaresh Jung; India
25 metre standard pistol pairs	Gai Gai; Poh Lip Meng; Singapore	Samresh Jung; Chandrasekhar Chaudhary; India	Mick Gault; Iqbal Ubhi; England
50 metre pistol singles	Omkar Singh; India	Gai Bin; Singapore	Lim Swee Hon Nigel; Singapore
50 metre pistol pairs	Gai Bin; Lim Swee Hon Nigel; Singapore	Deepak Sharma; Omkar Singh; India	Rhodney Richard Allen; Roger Peter Daniel; Trinidad and Tobago

==== Women's events ====
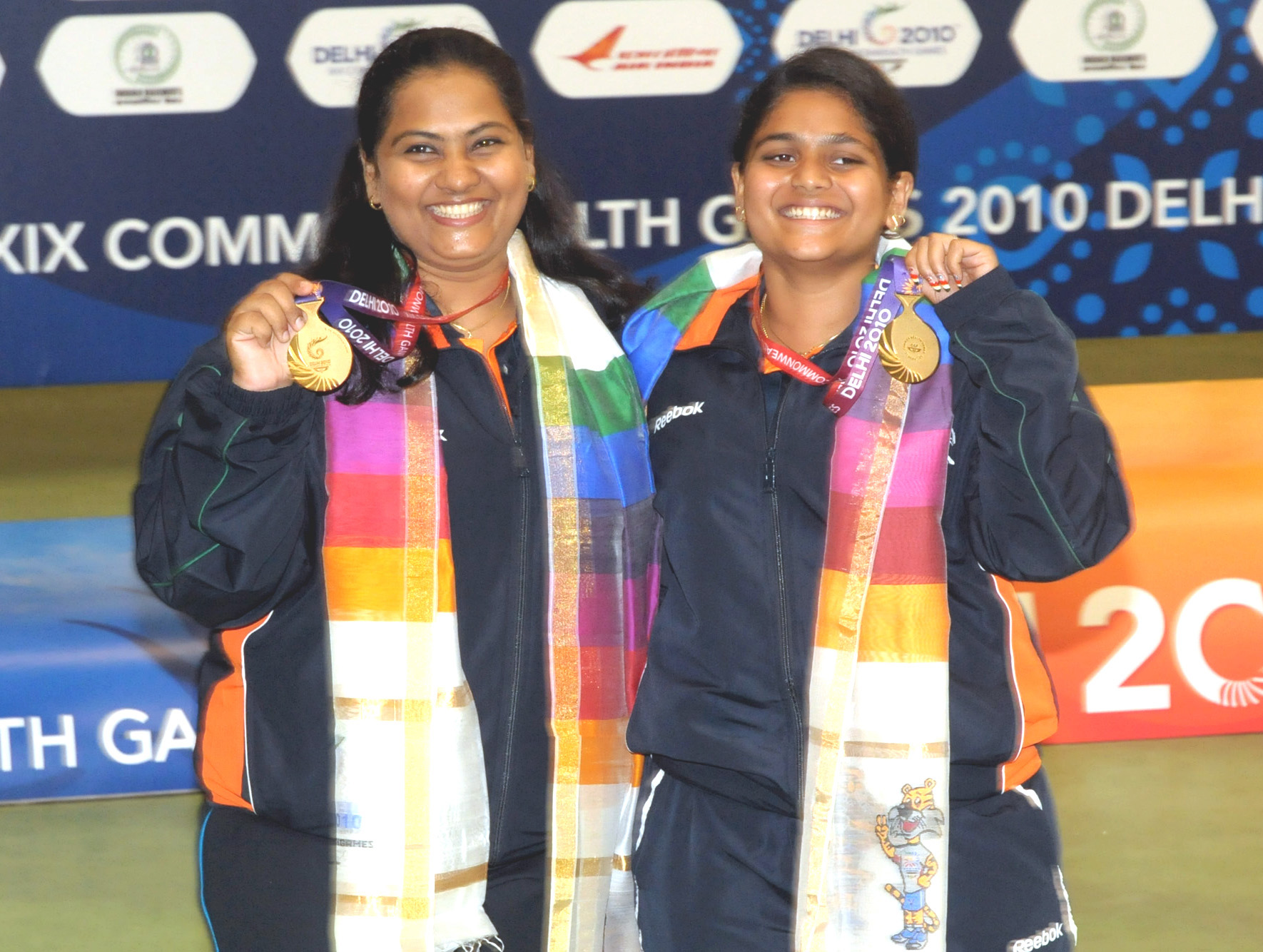
XIX Commonwealth Games-2010 Delhi Anisa Sayed and Sarnobat of India won the gold medal in 25M Pistol Women (Pair) event, at Karnail Singh Shooting Range, in New Delhi on 5 October 2010

Event	Gold	Silver	Bronze
10 metre air pistol singles	Pei Chin Bibiana Ng; Malaysia	Heena Sidhu; India	Dina Aspandiyarova; Australia
10 metre air pistol pairs	Heena Sidhu; Annuraj Singh; India	Dina Aspandiyarova; Pamela McKenzie; Australia	Dorothy Ludwig; Lynda Hare; Canada
25 metre pistol singles	Anisa Sayyed; India	Rahi Sarnobat; India	Bibiana Ng Pei Chin; Malaysia
25 metre pistol pairs	Rahi Sarnobat; Anisa Sayyed; India	Linda Ryan; Lalita Yauhleuskaya; Australia	Georgina Geikie; Julia Lydall; England

=== Small Bore and Air Rifle ===
==== Men's events ====
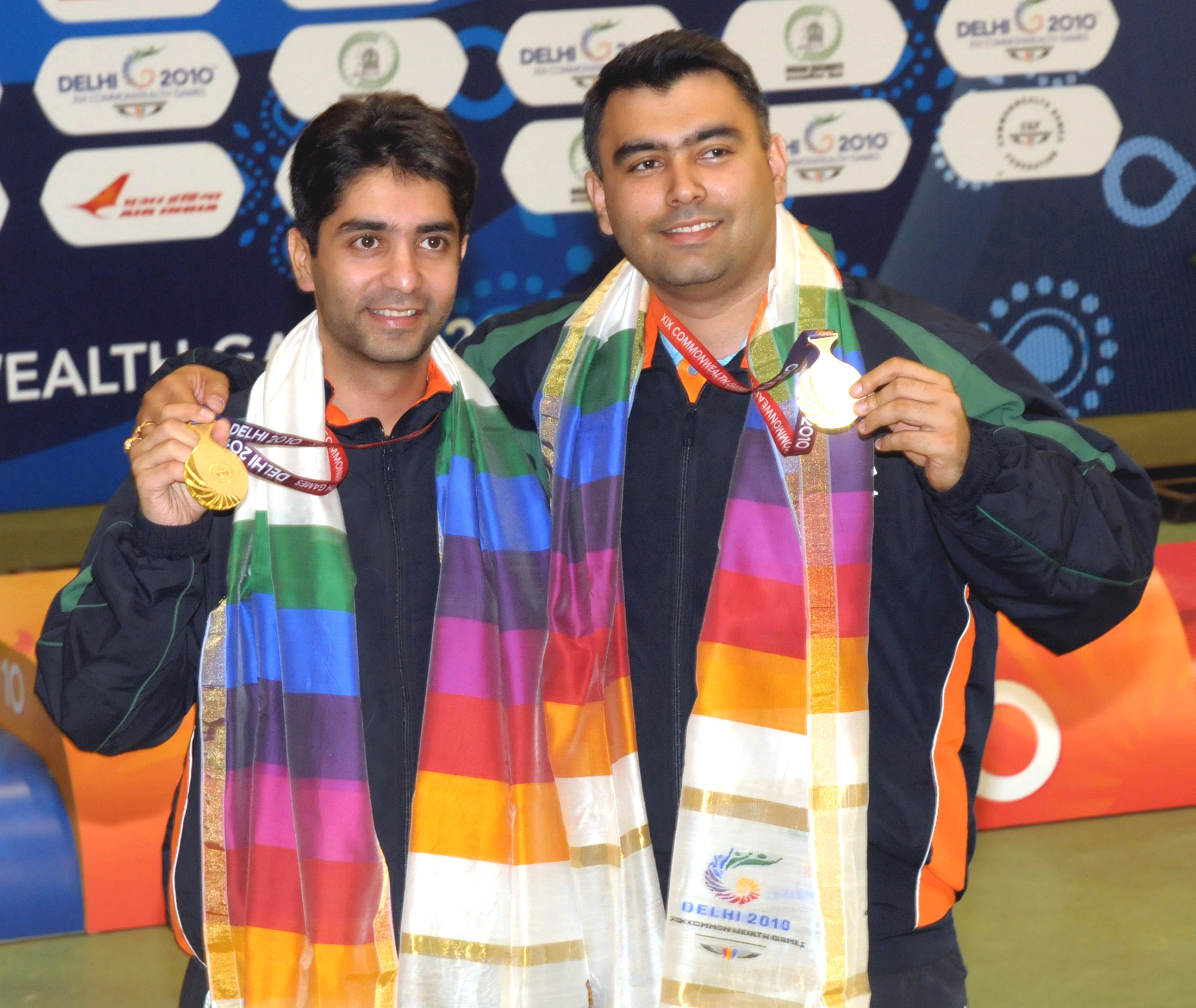
XIX Commonwealth Games-2010 Delhi Abhinav Bindra and Gagan Narang of India won the gold medal in 10m Air Rifle Men (Pair) event, at Dr. Karni Singh Shooting Range, in New Delhi on 5 October 2010

Event	Gold	Silver	Bronze
10 metre air rifle singles	Gagan Narang; India	Abhinav Bindra; India	James Huckle; England
10 metre air rifle pairs	Abhinav Bindra; Gagan Narang; India	James Huckle; Kenneth Parr; England	Abdullah Hel Baki; Md. Asif Hossain Khan; Bangladesh
50 metre rifle three positions singles	Gagan Narang; India	Jonathan Hammond; Scotland	James Huckle; England
50 metre rifle three positions pairs	Imran Hassan Khan; Gagan Narang; India	James Huckle; Kenneth Parr; England	Jonathan Hammond; Neil Stirton; Scotland
50 metre rifle prone singles	Jonathan Hammond; Scotland	Warren Potent; Australia	Matthew Hall; Northern Ireland
50 metre rifle prone pairs	Neil Stirton; Jonathan Hammond; Scotland	Michael Babb; Richard Wilson; England	Warren Potent; David Clifton; Australia

==== Women's events ====
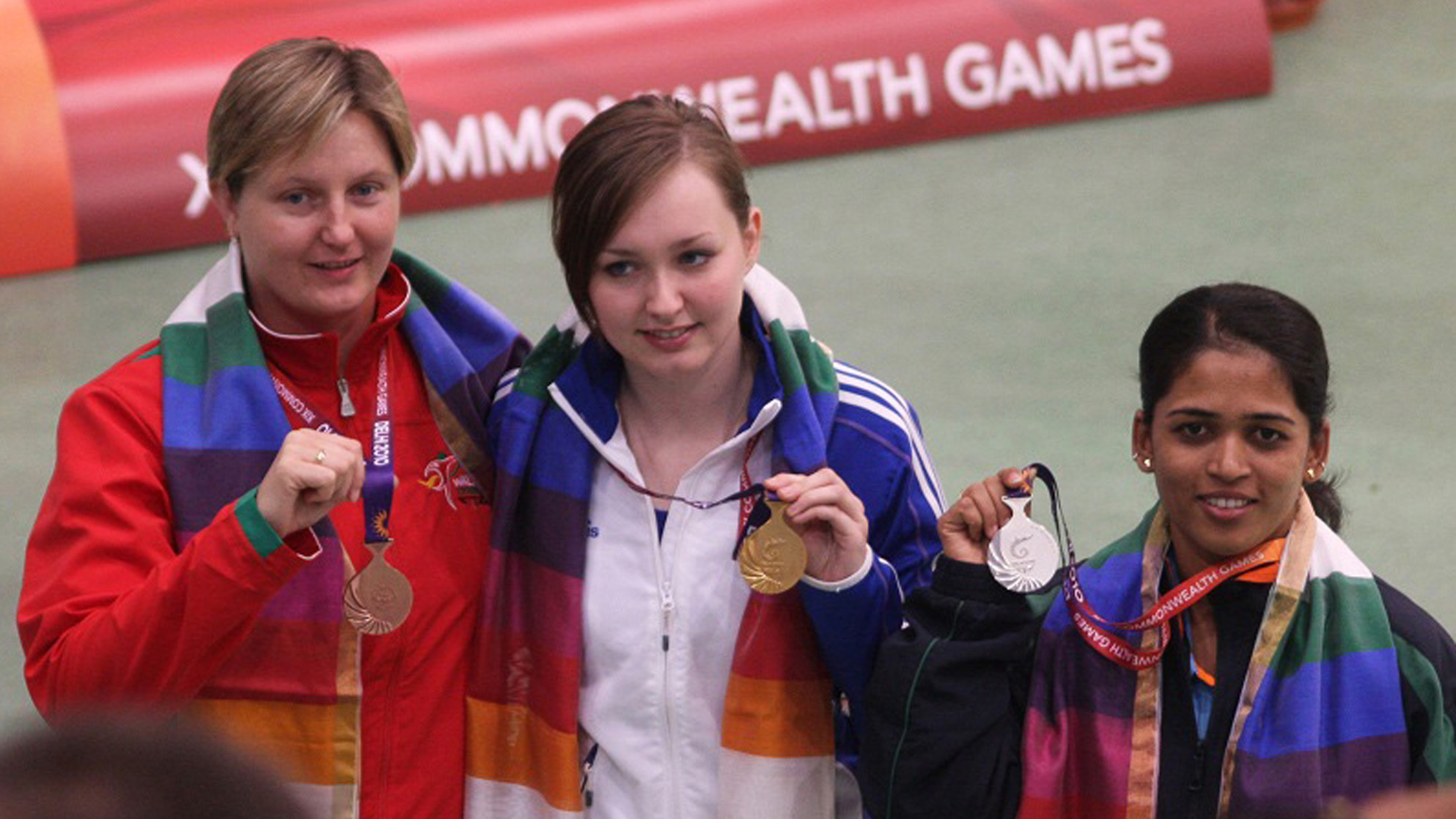
XIX Commonwealth Games-2010 Delhi Winners of (Singles Shooting 50M Rifle Prone Women’s), Mcintosh Jen of Scotland (Gold), Tejaswini Sawant of India (Silver) and Brekke Johanne of Wales (Bronze)

Event	Gold	Silver	Bronze
50 metre rifle three positions singles	Alethea Sedgman; Australia	Ser Xiang Wei Jasmine; Singapore	Aqilah Binte Sudhir; Singapore
50 metre rifle three positions pairs	Ser Xiang Wei Jasmine; Aqilah Binte Sudhir; Singapore	Lajjakumari Gauswami; Tejaswini Sawant; India	Kay Copland; Jennifer McIntosh; Scotland
50 metre rifle prone singles	Jennifer McIntosh; Scotland	Tejaswini Sawant; India	Johanne Brekke; Wales
50 metre rifle prone pairs	Jennifer McIntosh; Kay Copland; Scotland	Michelle Smith; Sharon Lee; England	Meena Kumari; Tejaswini Sawant; India
10 metre air rifle singles	Ser Xiang Wei Jasmine; Singapore	Ayuni Halim; Malaysia	Taibi Mohamed; Malaysia
10 metre air rifle pairs	Suryani Mohamed; Ayuni Halim; Malaysia	Ser Xiang Wei Jasmine; Cheng Jian Huan; Singapore	Suma Shirur; Kavita Yadav; India

=== Full Bore Rifle ===
Event	Gold	Silver	Bronze
Open singles	Parag Patel; England	James Corbett; Australia	David Calvert; Northern Ireland
Open pairs	Mike Collings; John Snowden; New Zealand	Angus McLeod; Ian Shaw; Scotland	Jon Underwood; Parag Patel; England

=== Clay target ===
==== Men's events ====
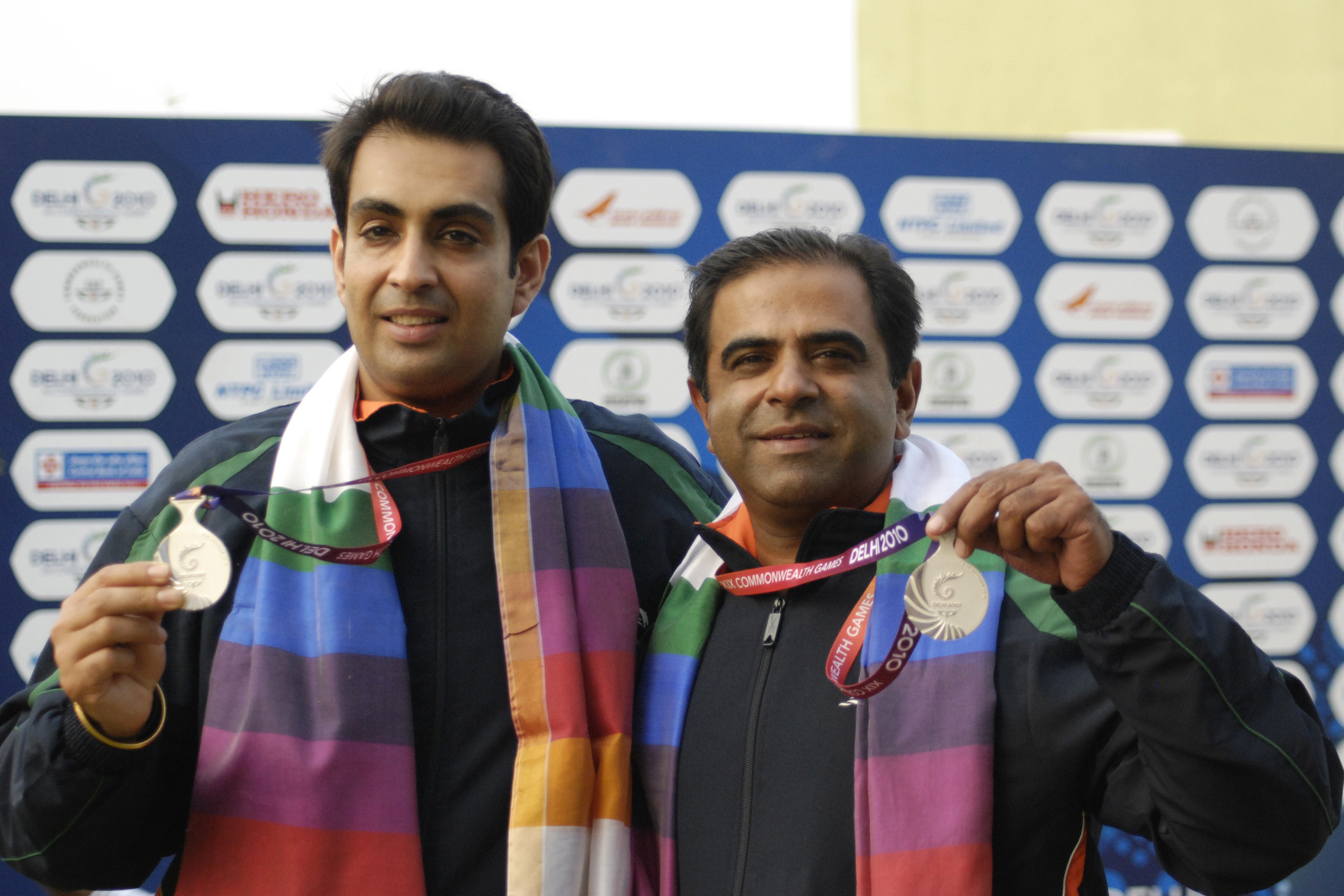
XIX Commonwealth Games-2010 Delhi (Men’s) Shooting Trap Pairs, India’s Mansher Singh and Manavjit Singh won Bronze medal, at Dr. Karni Singh Shooting Range, in New Delhi on 8 October 2010

Event	Gold	Silver	Bronze
Trap singles	Aaron Heading; England	Michael Diamond; Australia	Manavjit Singh Sandhu; India
Trap pairs	Michael Diamond; Adam Vella; Australia	Manavjit Singh Sandhu; Mansher Singh; India	Aaron Heading; Dave Kirk; England
Double trap singles	Stevan Walton; England	Ronjan Sodhi; India	Tim Kneale; Isle of Man
Double trap pairs	Steven Scott; Stevan Walton; England	Asher Noria; Ronjan Sodhi; India	Seng Chye; Benjamin Cheng Jie; Malaysia
Skeet singles	Richard Brickell; England	Georgios Achilleos; Cyprus	Andreas Chasikos; Cyprus
Skeet pairs	Georgios Achilleos; Andreas Chasikos; Cyprus	Jason Hughes Caswell; Richard McBride; Canada	Richard Brickell; Clive Bramley; England

==== Women's events ====
Event	Gold	Silver	Bronze
Trap singles	Anita North; England	Shona Marshall; Scotland	Gaby Ahrens; Namibia
Trap pairs	Laetisha Scanlan; Stacy Roiall; Australia	Abbey Burton; Anita North; England	Cynthia Meyer; Susan Nattrass; Canada

== Participating nations ==
- Antigua and Barbuda (4)
- Australia (30)
- Bangladesh (12)
- Barbados (6)
- Bermuda (4)
- Canada (16)
- Cayman Islands (2)
- Cyprus (10)
- England (22)
- Falkland Islands (8)
- Gibraltar (5)
- Guernsey (2)
- Guyana (2)
- India (30)
- Isle of Man (11)
- Jamaica (2)
- Jersey (6)
- Kenya (6)
- Malaysia (22)
- Maldives (4)
- Malta (10)
- Namibia (2)
- New Zealand (12)
- Niue (6)
- Norfolk Island (4)
- Northern Ireland (11)
- Pakistan (7)
- Saint Helena (4)
- Scotland (15)
- Singapore (20)
- South Africa (4)
- Sri Lanka (3)
- Trinidad and Tobago (7)
- Uganda (1)
- Wales (19)
