= Shooting at the 2010 Commonwealth Games – Women's 50 metre rifle prone singles =

The women's 50 metre rifle prone singles event took place at 12 October 2010 at the CRPF Campus.

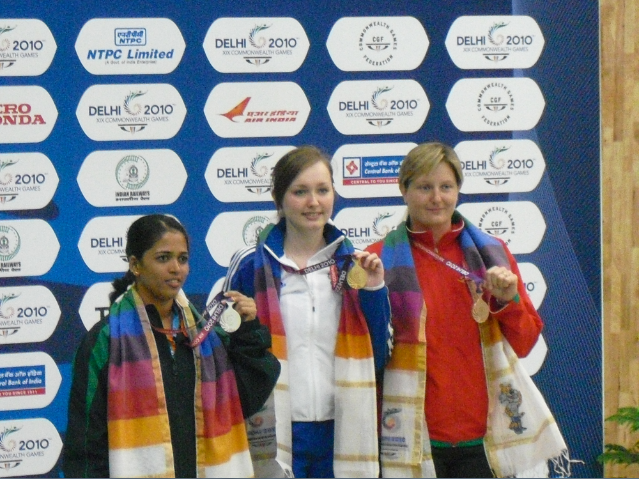
From the left: Tejaswini Sawant, Jennifer McIntosh, and Johanne Brekke.

== Results ==
Rank	Name	Country	1	2	3	4	5	6	Total
1st place, gold medalist(s)	Jennifer McIntosh	Scotland	99	100	98	100	100	100	597^{42} (GR)
2nd place, silver medalist(s)	Tejaswini Sawant	India	99	100	99	100	96	100	594^{31}
3rd place, bronze medalist(s)	Johanne Brekke	Wales	100	99	99	98	98	99	593^{33}
4	Michelle Smith	England	99	98	100	96	99	99	591^{33}
5	Susannah Smith	Australia	99	97	99	98	98	99	590^{36}
6	Aqilah Sudhir	Singapore	99	97	98	97	98	97	586^{33}
7	Meena Kumari	India	99	96	98	98	98	99	586^{30}
8	Sharon Lee	England	99	97	99	97	97	97	586^{30}
9	Sally Johnston	New Zealand	96	95	99	98	99	99	586^{26}
10	Helen Warnes	Wales	98	96	100	99	97	96	586^{26}
11	Juliet Etherington	New Zealand	97	100	96	98	99	95	585^{23}
12	Sabrina Sultana	Bangladesh	99	96	97	99	99	94	584^{29}
13	Kay Copland	Scotland	96	99	98	95	98	97	583^{31}
14	Lara Ward	Isle of Man	94	96	96	100	96	97	579^{26}
15	Louise Aiken	Northern Ireland	97	98	92	97	99	96	579^{23}
16	Gemma Kermode	Isle of Man	94	95	99	95	96	94	573^{17}
17	Muslifah Zulkifli	Malaysia	96	96	97	95	96	92	572^{24}
18	Deborah Lowe	Australia	98	94	94	99	94	93	572^{17}
19	Tripti Datta	Bangladesh	95	92	91	95	97	96	566^{17}
20	Siew Haw	Singapore	96	95	92	94	94	93	564^{15}
21	Haslisa Hamed	Malaysia	95	91	86	96	97	93	558^{18}
