= Shooting at the 2010 Commonwealth Games – Women's 50 metre rifle three positions pairs =

The Women's 25 metre pistol pairs event took place at 5 October 2010 at the CRPF Campus.

== Results ==
Rank	Name	Country	Prone	Standing	Kneeling	Individual Total	Total
1st place, gold medalist(s)	Aqilah Binte Sudhir	Singapore	199	190	192	581^{28}	1149^{44} (CGR)
1st place, gold medalist(s)	Ser Xiang Wei Jasmine	Singapore	194	187	187	568^{16}	1149^{44} (CGR)
2nd place, silver medalist(s)	Tejaswini Sawant	India	194	190	191	575^{18}	1143^{38}
2nd place, silver medalist(s)	Lajjakumari Gauswami	India	193	188	187	568^{20}	1143^{38}
3rd place, bronze medalist(s)	Kay Copland	Scotland	195	186	193	574^{19}	1142^{41}
3rd place, bronze medalist(s)	Jennifer McIntosh	Scotland	196	183	189	568^{22}	1142^{41}
4	Alethea Sedgman	Australia	197	185	187	569^{22}	1127^{31}
4	Robyn van Nus	Australia	189	184	185	558^{9}	1127^{31}
5	Nur Mohamed Taibi	Malaysia	195	188	189	572^{15}	1124^{24}
5	Shahera Rahim Raja	Malaysia	190	181	181	552^{9}	1124^{24}
6	Sian Corish	Wales	195	184	184	563^{20}	1122^{41}
6	Helen Warnes	Wales	198	177	184	559^{21}	1122^{41}
7	Michelle Smith	England	195	178	192	565^{19}	1118^{37}
7	Sharon Lee	England	196	169	188	553^{18}	1118^{37}
8	Sabrina Sultana	Bangladesh	196	182	183	561^{18}	1114^{32}
8	Sarmin Shilpa	Bangladesh	193	174	186	553^{14}	1114^{32}
