= Shooting at the 2010 Commonwealth Games – Women's 10 metre air rifle pairs =

The Women's 10 metre air rifle pairs event took place at 9 October 2010 at the CRPF Campus.

== Results ==
Rank	Name	Country	1	2	3	4	Ind. Total	Total
1st place, gold medalist(s)	Nur Mohamed	Malaysia	99	100	99	100	398^{29}	793^{59}
1st place, gold medalist(s)	Nur Halim	Malaysia	100	100	98	97	395^{30}	793^{59}
2nd place, silver medalist(s)	Xiang Ser	Singapore	100	99	97	100	396^{29}	790^{52}
2nd place, silver medalist(s)	Jian Cheng	Singapore	100	100	99	95	394^{23}	790^{52}
3rd place, bronze medalist(s)	Suma Shirur	India	99	99	100	99	397^{36}	785^{61}
3rd place, bronze medalist(s)	Kavitha Yadav	India	98	98	95	97	388^{25}	785^{61}
4	Jenny Corish	Wales	97	99	99	100	395^{30}	784^{54}
4	Sian Corish	Wales	99	97	97	96	389^{24}	784^{54}
5	Sharmin Ratna	Bangladesh	97	98	99	100	394^{27}	784^{53}
5	Sadiya Sultana	Bangladesh	96	97	99	98	390^{26}	784^{53}
6	Alethea Sedgman	Australia	97	99	97	99	392^{29}	780^{51}
6	Robyn van Nus	Australia	96	99	96	97	388^{22}	780^{51}
7	Sheree Cox	England	97	99	99	99	394^{30}	779^{47}
7	Sharon Lee	England	97	95	95	98	385^{17}	779^{47}
8	Marilena Constantinou	Cyprus	96	98	97	99	390^{28}	772^{28}
8	Fanoula Charalambous	Cyprus	95	95	96	96	382^{18}	772^{28}
–	Gemma Kermode	Isle of Man	92	95	97	95	379^{15}	DNS
–	Lara Ward	Isle of Man					DNS	DNS
