= Scotland at the 2010 Commonwealth Games =

- CG code: SCO
- CGA: Commonwealth Games Scotland
- Website: goscotland.org

in Delhi, India
- Competitors: 192
- Flag bearers: Opening: Ross Edgar; Closing: Jonathan Hammond
- Medals Ranked 10th: Gold 9 Silver 10 Bronze 7 Total 26

Commonwealth Games appearances (overview)
- 1930; 1934; 1938; 1950; 1954; 1958; 1962; 1966; 1970; 1974; 1978; 1982; 1986; 1990; 1994; 1998; 2002; 2006; 2010; 2014; 2018; 2022; 2026; 2030

Scotland were represented at the 2010 Commonwealth Games in Delhi. They used Flower of Scotland as its victory anthem for these games; replacing Scotland the Brave which had been in use since the 1950s. The change was decided by the Scottish athletes in a vote.

A team of 191 athletes was selected.

== Medalists ==
Medal	Name	Sport	Event	Date
Gold	Robert Renwick	Aquatics	Men's 200 m freestyle	5 October
Gold	Jen McIntosh and Kay Copland	Shooting	Women's 50 m metre rifle prone pairs	11 October
Gold	Hannah Miley	Aquatics	Women's 400 m individual medley	9 October
Gold	Colin Fleming and Jocelyn Rae	Tennis	Mixed Doubles	10 October
Gold	Jen McIntosh	Shooting	Women's 50m Rifle Prone	12 October
Gold	David Millar	Cycling	Men's time trial	13 October
Gold	Jonathan Hammond and Neil Stirton	Shooting	Men's 50m Rifle Prone Pairs	12 October
Gold	Callum Johnson	Boxing	Light heavyweight	13 October
Gold	Jonathan Hammond	Shooting	Men's 50m Rifle Prone	13 October
Silver	Michael Jamieson	Aquatics	Men's 200 m breaststroke	9 October
Silver	Jenny Davis and Charline Joiner	Cycling	Women's Team Sprint	6 October
Silver	David Carry, Andrew Hunter, Jak Scott, and Robert Renwick	Aquatics	Men's 4 x 200 m freestyle relay	6 October
Silver	Sean Fraser	Aquatics	100m Freestyle S8	8 October
Silver	Peter Kirkbride	Weightlifting	Men's 94 kg	9 October
Silver	Eilidh Child	Athletics	Women's 400 m hurdles	10 October
Silver	Jonathan Hammond	Shooting	Men's 50m Rifle Three Positions	9 October
Silver	Shona Marshall	Shooting	Women's Trap singles	10 October
Silver	Ian Shaw and Angus McLeod	Shooting	Fullbore Rifle Pairs	13 October
Silver	Josh Taylor	Boxing	Lightweight	15 October
Bronze	David Carry	Aquatics	Men's 400 m freestyle	4 October
Bronze	Lauren Smith	Aquatics	Woman's solo	7 October
Bronze	Kay Copland and Jen McIntosh	Shooting	Women's 50m Three Positions Rifle Pair	5 October
Bronze	Jonathan Hammond and Neil Stirton	Shooting	Men's 50m Three Positions Rifle Pair	8 October
Bronze	David Millar	Cycling	Men's road race	10 October
Bronze	Stevie Simmons	Boxing	Heavyweight	15 October
Bronze	Steph Twell	Athletics	Women's 1500 m	8 October

Medals by sport
Sport	gold	silver	bronze	Total
Aquatics	2	3	2	7
Cycling	1	1	1	3
Shooting	4	3	2	9
Archery	0	0	0	0
Athletics	0	1	1	2
Badminton	0	0	0	0
Boxing	1	1	1	3
Gymnastics	0	0	0	0
Hockey	0	0	0	0
Lawn bowls	0	0	0	0
Netball	0	0	0	0
Rugby sevens	0	0	0	0
Squash	0	0	0	0
Table tennis	0	0	0	0
Tennis	1	0	0	1
Weightlifting	0	1	0	1
Wrestling	0	0	0	0
Total	9	10	7	26

== Aquatics ==
=== Diving ===
Team Scotland had one competitor in the Women's 3 metre springboard event.

Events	Diver(s)	Qualification		Final	
Events	Diver(s)	Points	Rank	Points	Rank
3 metre springboard	Grace Reid	271.70 pts	7 Q	303.15 pts	6

=== Swimming ===
Team Scotland consists of 21 swimmers over 24 events.

Men

Event	Swimmer(s)	Rank
50m Freestyle	TBA	-
100m Freestyle	TBA	-
200m Freestyle	David Carry	Final (8th) 01:49.190
200m Freestyle	Robert Renwick	Final (1st) 01:47.880
400m Freestyle	David Carry	Final (3rd) 03:50.060
400m Freestyle	Robert Renwick	Final (6th) 03:51.740
1,500m Freestyle	TBA	-
4 × 100 m Freestyle Relay	Andrew Hunter; Jak Scott; Craig McNally; Cameron Brodie	Final (5th) 03:20.700
4 × 200 m Freestyle Relay	David Carry; Robert Renwick; Jak Scott; Andrew Hunter	Final (2nd) 7:14.02
50m Backstroke	TBA	-
100m Backstroke	Craig McNally	Heat (4th) 00:56.920
200m Backstroke	Craig McNally	Heats (3rd) 02:02.10
50m Breaststroke	TBA	-
100m Breaststroke	Kristopher Gilchrist	Final (7th) 1:01.43
100m Breaststroke	Michael Jamieson	Final (4th) 1:00.60
200m Breaststroke	Kristopher Gilchrist	Final (5th) 2:11.77
200m Breaststroke	Michael Jamieson	Final (2nd) 2:10.97
50m Butterfly	Andrew Mayor	Semifinal (5th) 00:24.700
100m Butterfly	Cameron Brodie	Semifinal (8th) 55.39
Andrew Mayor	Final (6th) 03:51.740	
200m Butterfly	Cameron Brodie	Heat (4th) 02:00.160
200m Butterfly	Andrew Mayor	Final (7th) 53.85
200m Butterfly	Lewis Smith	Heat (4th) 02:00.730
200m Individual Medley	Lewis Smith	Heat (4th) 2:03.88
400m Individual Medley	Lewis Smith	Final (8th) 4:21.64
4 × 100 m Medley Relay	David Carry; Andrew Hunter; Andrew Mayor; Craig McNally; Michael Jamieson	Final (5th) 3:40.68

Men – EAD (Para-Sports)

Event	Swimmer(s)	Rank
50m Freestyle S9	Sean Fraser	Final (6th) 28.63
100m Freestyle S8	Sean Fraser	Final (2nd)
100m Freestyle S10	TBA	-

Women

Event	Swimmer(s)	Rank	
50m Freestyle	Sara Hamilton	Heat (4th) 00:26.800	
100m Freestyle	Lucy Ellis	Semi (8th) 00:58.120	
100m Freestyle	Caitlin McClatchey	Semi (6th) 00:56.360	
100m Freestyle	Sara Hamilton	Heat (5th) 00:57.620	
100m Freestyle	Lucy Ellis	Heat (6th) 00:57.640	
200m Freestyle	Caitlin McClatchey	Heat (6th) 02:02.510	
400m Freestyle	Megan Gilchrist	DNS	
800m Freestyle	Megan Gilchrist	Final (7th) 8:47.83	
4 × 100 m Freestyle Relay	Lucy Ellis; Sara Hamilton; Caitlin McClatchey; Hannah Miley	Final (5th) 3:49.79	
4 × 200 m Freestyle Relay	Lucy Ellis; Megan Gilchrist; Caitlin McClatchey; Hannah Miley; Lucy Ellis; Sara Hamilton	Final (5th) 8:06.85	
50m Backstroke	TBA	-	
100m Backstroke	TBA	-	
200m Backstroke	TBA	-	
50m Breaststroke	Kathryn Johnstone	Final (7th) 00:32.190	
50m Breaststroke	Corrie Scott	Semifinal (5th) 00:32.800	
50m Breaststroke	Kerry Buchan	Semifinal (6th) 00:32.930	
100m Breaststroke	Kathryn Johnstone	Semifinal (6th) 1:11.00	
100m Breaststroke	Kerry Buchan	Semifinal (6th) 1:11.33	
100m Breaststroke	200m Breaststroke	Kerry Buchan	Final (8th) 02:31.18
Hannah Miley	200m Breaststroke	Final (7th) 02:30.20	
50m Butterfly	Louise Pate	Semifinal (5th) 00:27.490	
100m Butterfly	Louise Pate	Semifinal (5th) 1:00.83	
200m Butterfly	TBA	-	
200m Individual Medley	Hannah Miley	Final (5th) 02:12.900	
400m Individual Medley	Hannah Miley	Final (1st) 4:38.83	
4 × 100 m Medley Relay	Kerry Buchan; Caitlin McClatchey; Hannah Miley	Final (5th) 3:49.79	

Women – EAD (Para-Sports)

Event	Swimmer(s)	Rank
50m Freestyle S9	TBA	-
100m Freestyle S9	TBA	-
100m Butterfly S9	TBA	-

=== Synchronised swimming ===
Women

Event	Swimmer(s)	Rank
Solo	Lauren Smith	-
Duet	-	-

== Archery ==
Team Scotland consists of 10 archers over 7 events

Men

Event	Archer(s)	Ranking round		Round of 16	Quarter Final	Semi Final	Final	Rank
Event	Archer(s)	Score	Seed	Opposition Result	Opposition Result	Opposition Result	Opposition Result	Rank
Compound Individual	Kyle Dods	Mon 4 Oct	-	Tue 5 Oct	Sat 9 Oct	Sat 9 Oct	Sat 9 Oct	-
Compound Individual	Tim Keppie	Mon 4 Oct	-	Tue 5 Oct	Sat 9 Oct	Sat 9 Oct	Sat 9 Oct	-
Compound Individual	Alistair Whittingham	Mon 4 Oct	-	Tue 5 Oct	Sat 9 Oct	Sat 9 Oct	Sat 9 Oct	-
Compound Team	Kyle Dods; Tim Keppie; Alistair Whittingham				Wed 6 Oct	Thu 7 Oct	Thu 7 Oct	-
Recurve Individual	Mark Forrester	Mon 4 Oct	-	Tue 5 Oct	Sun 10 Oct	Sun 10 Oct	Sun 10 Oct	-
Recurve Individual	James Laing	Mon 4 Oct	-	Tue 5 Oct	Sun 10 Oct	Sun 10 Oct	Sun 10 Oct	-
Recurve Individual	Simon Needham	Mon 4 Oct	-	Tue 5 Oct	Sun 10 Oct	Sun 10 Oct	Sun 10 Oct	-
Recurve Team	Mark Forrester; James Laing; Simon Needham				Wed 6 Oct	Fri 8 Oct	Fri 8 Oct	-

Women

Event	Archer(s)	Ranking round		Round of 16	Quarter Final	Semi Final	Final	Rank
Event	Archer(s)	Score	Seed	Opposition Result	Opposition Result	Opposition Result	Opposition Result	Rank
Compound Individual	Claudine Jennings	Mon 4 Oct	-	Tue 5 Oct	Sat 9 Oct	Sat 9 Oct	Sat 9 Oct	-
Compound Individual	Susan Maitland	Mon 4 Oct	-	Tue 5 Oct	Sat 9 Oct	Sat 9 Oct	Sat 9 Oct	-
Compound Individual	Tracey McGowan	Mon 4 Oct	-	Tue 5 Oct	Sat 9 Oct	Sat 9 Oct	Sat 9 Oct	-
Compound Team	Claudine Jennings; Susan Maitland; Tracey McGowan				Wed 6 Oct	Thu 7 Oct	Thu 7 Oct	-
Recurve Individual	Emma Downie	Mon 4 Oct	-	Tue 5 Oct	Sun 10 Oct	Sun 10 Oct	Sun 10 Oct	-
Recurve Team	-				Wed 6 Oct	Fri 8 Oct	Fri 8 Oct	-

== Athletics ==
Team Scotland consists of 19 athletes over 16 events

Men – Track

Event	Athlete(s)	Heat		Quarter Final		Semi Final		Final	
Event	Athlete(s)	Result	Rank	Result	Rank	Result	Rank	Result	Rank
100m	-	Wed 6 Oct	-	Wed 6 Oct	-	Thu 7 Oct	-	Thu 7 Oct	-
200m	-	Sat 9 Oct	-	Sat 9 Oct	-	Sun 10 Oct	-	Sun 10 Oct	-
400m	-			Thu 7 Oct	-	Fri 8 Oct	-	Sat 9 Oct	-
800m	-					Fri 8 Oct	-	Sun 10 Oct	-
1,500m	Alistair Hay					Mon 11 Oct	-	Tue 12 Oct	-
5,000m	-							Mon 11 Oct	-
10,000m	-							Tue 12 Oct	-
110m Hurdles	Chris Baillie					Fri 8 Oct	-	Fri 8 Oct	-
400m Hurdles	-			Fri 8 Oct	-	Sat 9 Oct	-	Sun 10 Oct	-
3,000m Steeplechase	-							Mon 11 Oct	-
4 × 100 m Relay	-					Mon 11 Oct	-	Tue 12 Oct	-
4 × 400 m Relay	-					Mon 11 Oct	-	Tue 12 Oct	-

Men – Throws

Event	Athlete(s)	Qualifying		Final	
Event	Athlete(s)	Result	Rank	Result	Rank
Shot Put	-	Wed 6 Oct	-	Thu 7 Oct	-
Discus Throw	Angus McInroy	Sat 9 Oct	(9th)54.30	Sun 10 Oct	
Hammer Throw	Mark Dry	Thu 7 Oct	NA	Fri 8 Oct	(6th)67.41
Hammer Throw	Andy Frost	Thu 7 Oct	NA	Fri 8 Oct	(4th)69.08
Javelin Throw	James Campbell	Mon 11 Oct	-	Tue 12 Oct	-

Men – Jumps

Event	Athlete(s)	Qualifying		Final	
Event	Athlete(s)	Result	Rank	Result	Rank
Long Jump	-	Fri 8 Oct	-	Sat 9 Oct	-
High Jump	-	Thu 7 Oct	-	Sat 9 Oct	-
Triple Jump	-	Mon 11 Oct	-	Tue 12 Oct	-
Pole Vault	Richard Hurren	Sat 9 Oct	-	Mon 11 Oct	-
Pole Vault	Alistair Strange	Sat 9 Oct	-	Mon 11 Oct	-

Men – Combined

Event	Athlete(s)	100m	Long Jump	Shot Put	High Jump	400m	110m Hurdles	Discus	Pole Vault	Javelin	1,500m	Final	
Event	Athlete(s)	100m	Long Jump	Shot Put	High Jump	400m	110m Hurdles	Discus	Pole Vault	Javelin	1,500m	Result	Rank
Decathlon	Roger Skedd	-	-	-	-	-	-	-	-	-	-	Fri 8 Oct	-

Men – Road

Event	Athlete(s)	Final	
Event	Athlete(s)	Result	Rank
Marathon	Martin Williams	Thu 14 Oct	-
20 km Walk	-	Sat 9 Oct	-

Men – EAD (Para-Sports)

Event	Athlete(s)	Heat		Quarter Final		Semi Final		Final	
Event	Athlete(s)	Result	Rank	Result	Rank	Result	Rank	Result	Rank
100m T46	-	-	-	-	-	-	-	-	-
1,500m T54 Wheelchair	-	-	-	-	-	-	-	-	-
Shot Put F32/34/52	-	-	-	-	-	-	-	-	-

Women – Track

Event	Athlete(s)	Heat		Quarter Final		Semi Final		Final	
Event	Athlete(s)	Result	Rank	Result	Rank	Result	Rank	Result	Rank
100m	-			Wed 6 Oct	-	Thu 7 Oct	-	Thu 7 Oct	-
200m	-			Sat 9 Oct	-	Sun 10 Oct	-	Sun 10 Oct	-
400m	Lee McConnell	Wed 6 Oct	(1st)53.24	Thu 7 Oct	-	Fri 8 Oct	(2nd)52.27	Sat 9 Oct	(5th)52.36
800m	Claire Gibson			Sat 9 Oct	-	Sun 10 Oct	-	Mon 11 Oct	-
1,500m	Steph Twell					Thu 7 Oct	-	Fri 8 Oct	(3rd) 4:06.15
5,000m	Freya Murray							Wed 6 Oct	-
5,000m	Steph Twell							Wed 6 Oct	-
10,000m	-							Fri 8 Oct	-
100m Hurdles	-					Sun 10 Oct	-	Mon 11 Oct	-
400m Hurdles	Eilidh Child					Sat 9 Oct	(2nd)56.16	Sun 10 Oct	-
3,000m Steeplechase	Lennie Waite							Sat 9 Oct	-
4 × 100 m Relay	-					Mon 11 Oct	-	Tue 12 Oct	-
4 × 400 m Relay	Eilidh Child; Claire Gibson; Lee McConnell; Gemma Nicol; Kathryn Evans					Mon 11 Oct	-	Tue 12 Oct	-

Women – Throws

Event	Athlete(s)	Qualifying		Final	
Event	Athlete(s)	Result	Rank	Result	Rank
Shot Put	-	Fri 8 Oct	-	Sat 9 Oct	-
Discus Throw	-	Sun 10 Oct	-	Mon 11 Oct	-
Hammer Throw	-	Wed 6 Oct	-	Thu 7 Oct	-
Javelin Throw	-	Fri 8 Oct	-	Sat 9 Oct	-

Women – Jumps

Event	Athlete(s)	Qualifying		Final	
Event	Athlete(s)	Result	Rank	Result	Rank
Long Jump	-	Sat 9 Oct	-	Sun 10 Oct	-
High Jump	-	Fri 8 Oct	-	Sun 10 Oct	-
Triple Jump	-	Thu 7 Oct	-	Fri 8 Oct	-
Pole Vault	Henrietta Paxton	Sun 10 Oct	-	Tue 12 Oct	-

Women – Combined

Event	Athlete(s)	100m Hurdles	High Jump	Shot Put	200m	Long Jump	Javelin	800m	Final	
Event	Athlete(s)	100m Hurdles	High Jump	Shot Put	200m	Long Jump	Javelin	800m	Result	Rank
Heptathlon	-	-	-	-	-	-	-	-	Sat 9 Oct	-

Women – Road

Event	Athlete(s)	Final	
Event	Athlete(s)	Result	Rank
Marathon	-	Thu 14 Oct	-
20 km Walk	-	Sat 9 Oct	-

Women – EAD (Para-Sports)

Event	Athlete(s)	Heat		Quarter Final		Semi Final		Final	
Event	Athlete(s)	Result	Rank	Result	Rank	Result	Rank	Result	Rank
100m T37	-	-	-	-	-	-	-	-	-
1,500m T54 Wheelchair	-	-	-	-	-	-	-	-	-
Shot Put F32-34/52/53	-	-	-	-	-	-	-	-	-

== Badminton ==
Team Scotland consisted of 8 badminton players over 6 events

Men

Athlete	Events
Watson Briggs	doubles, mixed doubles, team
Kieran Merrilees	singles, mixed doubles, team
Paul van Rietvelde	doubles, mixed doubles, team

Women

Athlete	Events
Imogen Bankier	doubles, mixed doubles, team
Jillie Cooper	doubles, mixed doubles, team
Susan Eglestaff	singles, team
Kirsty Gilmour	singles, doubles, team
Emma Mason	doubles, mixed doubles, team

== Boxing ==
Team Scotland consists of 6 boxers over 6 events

Men

Event	Boxer	Round of 32	Round of 16	Quarter Final	Semi Final	Final	Rank
Event	Boxer	Opposition Result	Opposition Result	Opposition Result	Opposition Result	Opposition Result	Rank
Light Flyweight 49 kg	Ian Butcher	BYE	(Northern Ireland) Barnes; L PTS 4-2 (NIR)	-	-	-	-
Flyweight 52 kg	-	-	-	-	-	-	-
Bantamweight 56 kg	Joe Ham	BYE	(Namibia) Lukas; L PTS 11-14 (NAM)	-	-	-	-
Lightweight 60 kg	Josh Taylor	(Wales) Edwards (WAL); W PTS 5-1	(Samoa) Ioane(SAM); W PTS 4-1	(Kiribati) Roddy (WAL)	-	-	-
Light Welterweight 64 kg	-	-	-	-	-	-	-
Welterweight 69 kg	Aston Brown	(Kenya) Okwiri (KEN); W PTS 8-3	(Canada) Clayton (CAN); W PTS 4-1	(England) Smith (ENG)	-	-	-
Middleweight 75 kg	-	-	-	-	-	-	-
Light Heavyweight 81 kg	-	-	-	-	-	-	-
Heavyweight 91 kg	Stephen Simmons	BYE	(South Africa) Manganyi (RSA); W PTS 10-2	(Canada) El-Mais (CAN)	-	-	-
Super Heavyweight +91 kg	Ross Henderson	-	(Australia) Mukhin (AUS); L PTS 7-1	-	-	-	-

== Cycling ==
Team Scotland consists of 19 cyclists over ? events

=== Road ===
Men

Event	Cyclist(s)	Time	Rank
40 km Time Trial	David Millar	-	1
40 km Time Trial	Evan Oliphant	-	11
40 km Time Trial	Andrew Fenn	-	14
167 km Road Race	Ross Crebar	-	DNF
167 km Road Race	Andrew Fenn	-	13
167 km Road Race	David Lines	-	DNF
167 km Road Race	James McCallum	-	DNF
167 km Road Race	David Millar	-	3
167 km Road Race	Evan Oliphant	-	21

Women

Event	Cyclist(s)	Time	Rank
29 km Time Trial	Pippa Handley	-	16
100 km Road Race	Jane Barr	-	35
100 km Road Race	Kate Cullen	-	17
100 km Road Race	Anne Ewing	-	37
100 km Road Race	Pippa Handley	-	31
100 km Road Race	Eileen Roe	-	20
100 km Road Race	Claire Thomas	-	24

=== Track ===
Men

Ross Edgar, Andrew Fenn, James McCallum, Evan Oliphant, John Paul, Chris Pritchard, Callum Skinner, Kevin Stewart

Event	Cyclist(s)	Qualifying		1/16 Final	1/8 Final	Quarter Final	Semi Final	Final	Rank
Event	Cyclist(s)	Time	Rank	Opposition Result	Opposition Result	Opposition Result	Opposition Result	Opposition Result	Rank
1 km Time Trial	TBA							-	-
Individual Sprint	TBA	-	-	-	-	-	-	-	-
Team Sprint	TBA	-						-	-
Individual Pursuit	TBA	-						-	-
Team Pursuit	TBA	-						-	-
Kieren	TBA				-	-	-	-	-
Scratch Race	TBA							-	-
Points Race	TBA							-	-

Women

Kate Cullen, Jenny Davis, Charline Joiner, Eileen Roe

Event	Cyclist(s)	Qualifying		1/16 Final	1/8 Final	Quarter Final	Semi Final	Final	Rank
Event	Cyclist(s)	Time	Rank	Opposition Result	Opposition Result	Opposition Result	Opposition Result	Opposition Result	Rank
500m Time Trial	TBA							-	-
Individual Sprint	TBA	-	-	-	-	-	-	-	-
Team Sprint	TBA	-						-	-
Individual Pursuit	TBA	-						-	-
Scratch Race	TBA							-	-
Points Race	TBA							-	-

== Gymnastics ==
Team Scotland consists of 7 gymnasts over 18 events

=== Artistic ===
Men

Adam Cox, Ryan McKee

Event	Gymnast(s)	Qualification		Final	
Event	Gymnast(s)	Points	Rank	Points	Rank
Team Competition	TBA	-	-	-	-
Individual All-Round	Ryan McKee	-	-	77.550	(17th)
Floor	TBA	-	-	-	-
Horizontal Bar	TBA	-	-	-	-
Parallel Bars	TBA	-	-	-	-
Pommel Horse	TBA	-	-	-	-
Rings	TBA	-	-	-	-
Vault	TBA	-	-	-	-

Women

Jordan Lipton, Amy Regan, Tori Simpson, Emma White

Event	Gymnast(s)	Qualification		Final	
Event	Gymnast(s)	Points	Rank	Points	Rank
Team Competition	TBA	-	-	-	-
Individual All-Round	TBA	-	-	-	-
Beam	TBA	-	-	-	-
Floor	TBA	-	-	-	-
Uneven Bars	TBA	-	-	-	-
Vault	TBA	-	-	-	-

=== Rhythmic ===
Women

Vicky Clow

Event	Gymnast(s)	Qualification		Final	
Event	Gymnast(s)	Points	Rank	Points	Rank
Team Competition	TBA	-	-	-	-
Individual All-Round	TBA	-	-	-	-
Ball	TBA	-	-	-	-
Hoop	TBA	-	-	-	-
Ribbon	TBA	-	-	-	-
Rope	TBA	-	-	-	-

== Hockey ==
Team Scotland consists of 32 hockey players over the 2 team events.

Summary

Event	Team	Rank
Men's Team	Scotland	9
Women's Team	Scotland	7

Men

Scotland Squad:
Kenny Bain, Stephen Dick, Alan Forsyth, Cameron Fraser, Gareth Hall, William Marshall, Vishal Marwaha, Alistair McGregor (gk),
Gordon McIntyre, Graham Moodie, Chris Nelson (c), Mark Ralph, Derek Salmond, Iain Scholefield, Niall Stott, Ross Stott, coach - Russell Garcia

Pool A

Team	Pts	Pld	W	D	L	GF	GA	GD
Australia	9	3	3	0	0	15	2	+13
Pakistan	6	3	2	0	1	7	2	-
India	3	3	2	0	1	9	7	+2
Malaysia	3	3	1	0	2	5	7	–2
Scotland	0	4	0	0	4	0	18	–18

5 October 2010
10:30

Pakistan	3-0	Scotland

6 October 2010
08:30

Australia	9-0	Scotland

8 October 2010
20:30

Malaysia	2-0	Scotland

9 October 2010
19:00

Scotland	0-4	India

Women

Scotland Squad:
Louise Baxter, Alison Bell, Vikki Bunce, Aimee Clark, Linda Clement, Holly Cram, Leigh Fawcett, Catriona Forrest,
Samantha Judge, Nikki Kidd, Emily Maguire, Kareena Marshall, Morag McLellan, Becky Merchant, Chris(tine) Nelson, Ailsa Robertson, Abi Walker

Pool A

Team	Pts	Pld	W	D	L	GF	GA	GD
Australia	10	4	3	1	0	19	4	+15
South Africa	7	4	2	1	1	16	5	+11
India	7	4	2	1	1	12	4	+8
Scotland	4	4	1	1	2	10	9	+1
Trinidad and Tobago	0	4	0	0	4	1	36	–35

4 October 2010
18:00

India	1-1	Scotland

5 October 2010
21:00

South Africa	2-1	Scotland

7 October 2010
11:00

Scotland	6-1	Trinidad and Tobago

9 October 2010
13:30

Australia	5-2	Scotland

== Lawn bowls ==
Team Scotland consists of 12 lawn bowls players over 6 events

Men

Event	Player(s)	Rank
Men's singles	Paul Foster	quarter finals
Men's pairs	Darren Burnett; Neil Speirs	semi-finals
Men's triples	Wayne Hogg; David Peacock; Willie Wood	4th, section A

Women

Event	Player(s)	Rank
Women's singles	Claire Johnston	semi-finals
Women's pairs	Caroline Brown; Margaret Letham	4th, section B
Women's triples	Michelle Cooper; Lorraine Malloy; Lynn Stein	quarter-finals

== Rugby sevens ==
Summary

Event	Team	Rank
Men's Team	Scotland	-

Men

Mike Adamson, Alexander Blair, David Callam, Scott Forrest, Chris Fusaro, John Houston,
Lee Jones, Stuart McInally, Scott Newlands, Hefin O'Hare, Colin Shaw, Andrew Turnbull

Group A

Team	Pld	W	D	L	PF	PA	PD	Pts
New Zealand	3	3	0	0	141	7	+134	9
Scotland	3	2	0	1	45	63	−18	7
Canada	3	1	0	2	71	62	9	5
Guyana	3	0	0	3	0	125	−125	3

11 October 2010
10:06

Scotland	v	Guyana

Delhi University

11 October 2010
13:12

Scotland	v	Canada

Delhi University

11 October 2010
17:32

New Zealand	v	Scotland

Delhi University

== Shooting ==
Team Scotland consists of 15 shooters over 21 events

Clay Target – Men

Event	Shooter(s)	Rank
Trap Singles	John MacDonald	(23)
Trap Singles	Osmond McLean	(10th)
Trap Pairs	John MacDonald; Osmond McLean	(4th)
Skeet Singles	Drew Christie	(4th)
Skeet Singles	Ian Marsden	-
Skeet Pairs	Drew Christie; Ian Marsden	(7th)

Clay Target – Women

Event	Shooter(s)	Rank
Trap Singles	Shona Marshall	(2nd)
Trap Pairs	Shona Marshall; Linda Pearson	(6th)

Pistol – Men

Event	Shooter(s)	Rank
10m Air Pistol Singles	Alan Ritchie	(11th)
50m Pistol Singles	Alan Ritchie	(19th)

Pistol – Women

Event	Shooter(s)	Rank
10m Air Pistol Singles	Caroline Brownlie	-
25m Pistol Singles	Caroline Brownlie	-

Small Bore & Air Rifle – Men

Event	Shooter(s)	Rank
10m Air Rifle Singles	Graham Rudd	-
50m Rifle 3 Pos Singles	Jonathan Hammond	(2nd)
50m Rifle 3 Pos Singles	Neil Stirton	-
50m Rifle 3 Pos Pairs	Jonathan Hammond; Neil Stirton	(3rd)
50m Rifle Prone Singles	Jonathan Hammond	(1st)
50m Rifle Prone Singles	Neil Stirton	-
50m Rifle Prone Pairs	Jonathan Hammond; Neil Stirton	(1st)

Small Bore & Air Rifle – Women

Event	Shooter(s)	Rank
50m Rifle 3 Pos Singles	Kay Copland	-
50m Rifle 3 Pos Singles	Jennifer McIntosh	-
50m Rifle 3 Pos Pairs	Kay Copland; Jennifer McIntosh	(3rd)
50m Rifle Prone Singles	Kay Copland	-
50m Rifle Prone Singles	Jennifer McIntosh	(1st)
50m Rifle Prone Pairs	Kay Copland; Jennifer McIntosh	(1st)

Full Bore – Open

Event	Shooter(s)	Rank
Full Bore Singles	Angus McLeod	-
Full Bore Singles	Ian Shaw	-
Full Bore Pairs	Angus McLeod; Ian Shaw	(2nd)

== Squash ==
Team Scotland consists of 6 squash players over 5 events.

The competition draw was announced on 22 September 2010. (Seeds are denoted in brackets after players' names)

Men's Singles

Player(s)	Round of 64	Round of 32	Round of 16	Quarter Final	Semi Final	Final	Rank
Player(s)	Opposition Result	Opposition Result	Opposition Result	Opposition Result	Opposition Result	Opposition Result	Rank
Alan Clyne	Kyme (BER); W 11–4 11–0 11–0	(England) Barker (ENG); L 11–4 11–2 11–3	-	-	-	-	-
Lyall Paterson	Chifunda (ZAM); W w/o	(India) Ghosal (IND); L 11–6 11–6 11–7	-	-	-	-	-
Chris Small	Boswell (AUS) (8); L 11–7 11–6 11–4	-	-	-	-	-	-
Harry Leitch	Ragontse (BOT); W 11–6 11–2 8–11 11–8	(New Zealand) Grayson (NZL); L 11–4 11–5 11–3	-	-	-	-	-

Women's Singles

Player(s)	Round of 64	Round of 32	Round of 16	Quarter Final	Semi Final	Final	Rank
Player(s)	Opposition Result	Opposition Result	Opposition Result	Opposition Result	Opposition Result	Opposition Result	Rank
Lisa Aitken	BYE	Massaro (ENG) (5); L 11–4 11–2 11–5	-	-	-	-	-
Frania Gillen-Buchert	Khalil (GUY); W 11–2 11–3 11–6	(Australia) Camilleri (AUS); L 11–5 11–7 11–7	-	-	-	-	-

Men's Doubles

Player(s)	Pool Match	Pool Match	Round of 16	Quarter Final	Semi Final	Third Place	Rank
Player(s)	Opposition Result	Opposition Result	Opposition Result	Opposition Result	Opposition Result	Opposition Result	Rank
Alan Clyne & Harry Leitch (5)	Butt & Khan (PAK) (12); W 2–0	Matewere & Taulo (MAW); W 11–2 11–1	Jangra & Sandhu (IND) (11); W	(England) Barker & Selby (ENG) (3); W 11–7 11–7	(Australia) Palmer & Boswell (AUS) (2); L 11–10 11–6	(Australia) Cuskelly & Pilley (AUS) (4); L 11–5 11–7	4th
Lyall Paterson & Chris Small (9)	Nandrajog & Suchde (IND) (8); W 11–8 11–8	Bains & Reel (KEN); W	(Malta) Fiteni & Hindle (MLT) (14); W	(Australia) Palmer & Boswell (AUS) (2); L 11–2 11–2	-	-	-

Women's Doubles

Player(s)	Pool Match	Pool Match	Quarter Final	Semi Final	Final	Rank
Player(s)	Opposition Result	Opposition Result	Opposition Result	Opposition Result	Opposition Result	Rank
Lisa Aitken & Frania Gillen-Buchert (6)	Curgenven & Norman-Ross (GUE); W 11–4 11–1	(New Zealand) Hawkes & King (NZL) (4); L 11–5 11–4	(Australia) Pittock & Camilleri (AUS) (3); L 11–9 11–8	-	-	-

Mixed Doubles

Player(s)	Pool Match	Pool Match	Pool Match	Quarter Final	Semi Final	Final	Rank
Player(s)	Opposition Result	Opposition Result	Opposition Result	Opposition Result	Opposition Result	Opposition Result	Rank
Harry Leitch & Lisa Aitken (10)	David & Hee (MAS) (3); W 11–9 11–5	Edmison & McDougall (CAN)	Nimji & Reel (KEN)	(Australia) Palmer & Urquhart (AUS); L 11–3 11–3	-	-	-
Frania Gillen-Buchert & Alan Clyne (9)	Chinappa & Ghosal (IND) (4)	West & Stafford (CAY)	Stubbings & Rucklinger (PNG)	-	-	-	-

== Table Tennis ==
Team Scotland consists of 3 table tennis players over 3 events.

Men

Event	Player(s)	Rank
Men's Singles	Gavin Rumgay	-
Men's Doubles	Craig Howieson; Gavin Rumgay	-
Men's Team	Stewart Crawford; Craig Howieson; Gavin Rumgay	-

== Tennis ==
Team Scotland consists of 5 players over 5 events.

Men

Colin Fleming Singles and Doubles
Jamie Murray Doubles

Event	Player(s)	Rank
Men's Singles	Colin Fleming	Second Round
Men's Singles	Jamie Murray	Second Round
Men's Doubles	Colin Fleming Jamie Murray	First Round

Women

Mhairi Brown Singles and Doubles
Jocelyn Rae Doubles

Event	Player(s)	Rank
Women's Singles
Women's Singles	Mhairi Brown	First Round
Women's Doubles	Mhairi Brown Jocelyn Rae	Quarterfinals

Mixed

Event	Player(s)	Rank
Mixed Doubles	Mhairi Brown Jamie Murray	Quarterfinals
Mixed Doubles	Colin Fleming Jocelyn Rae	Winners

== Weightlifting ==
Team Scotland consists of 3 weightlifters over 3 events.

Men

Event	Weightlifter	Weights Lifted		Total Lifted	Rank
Event	Weightlifter	Snatch	Clean & Jerk	Total Lifted	Rank
77 kg	Graeme Kane	-	-	-	-
94 kg	Peter Kirkbride	-	-	-	-
105 kg	Tommy Yule	-	-	-	-

== Wrestling ==
Team Scotland consists of 10 wrestlers over 10 events.

Men – Freestyle

Event	Wrestler	Rank
Freestyle 55 kg	Craig McKenna	-
Freestyle 60 kg	Viorel Etko	-
Freestyle 74 kg	Sean Keogh	-

Women

Event	Wrestler	Rank
Freestyle 48 kg	Fiona Robertson	-
Freestyle 51 kg	Donna Robertson	-
Freestyle 55 kg	Jayne Clason	-
Freestyle 59 kg	Kathryn Marsh	-
Freestyle 63 kg	Tracey Connell	-
Freestyle 67 kg	Ashlea McManus	-
Freestyle 72 kg	Sarah Jones	-

== See also ==
- Commonwealth Games Council for Scotland
- Scotland at the 2006 Commonwealth Games
