= Shooting at the 2010 Commonwealth Games – Women's 50 metre rifle prone pairs =

The women's 50 metre rifle prone pairs event took place at 11 October 2010 at the CRPF Campus.

== Results ==
Rank	Name	Country	1	2	3	4	5	6	Individual Total	Total
1st place, gold medalist(s)	Jennifer McIntosh	Scotland	99	98	100	98	99	97	591^{35}	1169^{60}
1st place, gold medalist(s)	Kay Copland	Scotland	97	96	100	94	94	97	578^{25}	1169^{60}
2nd place, silver medalist(s)	Michelle Smith	England	98	100	98	98	98	98	590^{24}	1169^{52}
2nd place, silver medalist(s)	Sharon Lee	England	95	95	98	97	96	98	579^{28}	1169^{52}
3rd place, bronze medalist(s)	Meena Kumari	India	98	99	98	97	94	99	585^{23}	1168^{45}
3rd place, bronze medalist(s)	Tejaswini Sawant	India	98	100	98	94	94	99	583^{22}	1168^{45}
4	Johanne Brekke	Wales	98	98	98	99	98	98	589^{30}	1166^{56}
4	Helen Warnes	Wales	95	96	97	96	97	96	577^{26}	1166^{56}
5	Haslisa Hamed	Malaysia	98	98	93	97	98	99	583^{22}	1165^{41}
5	Muslifah Zulkifli	Malaysia	97	98	98	97	97	95	582^{19}	1165^{41}
6	Susannah Smith	Australia	96	100	99	95	98	98	586^{26}	1158^{42}
6	Deborah Lowe	Australia	95	96	99	95	94	93	572^{16}	1158^{42}
7	Sally Johnston	New Zealand	96	93	97	97	99	99	581^{21}	1155^{43}
7	Juliet Etherington	New Zealand	94	94	95	97	96	98	574^{22}	1155^{43}
8	Aqilah Sudhir	Singapore	99	94	97	97	99	98	584^{23}	1155^{40}
8	Siew Haw	Singapore	96	94	91	95	97	98	571^{17}	1155^{40}
9	Sabrina Sultana	Bangladesh	95	98	97	96	95	99	580^{24}	1143^{38}
9	Tripti Datta	Bangladesh	94	93	91	96	97	92	563^{14}	1143^{38}
10	Lara Ward	Isle of Man	95	94	95	96	97	96	573^{18}	1132^{34}
10	Gemma Kermode	Isle of Man	94	93	92	97	92	91	559^{16}	1132^{34}
