= Shooting at the 2010 Commonwealth Games – Women's trap pairs =

The Women's trap pairs event of the 2010 Commonwealth Games took place on 8 October 2010 at the CRPF Campus.

== Results ==
Rank	Name	Country	Series 1	Series 2	Indi. total	Total
1st place, gold medalist(s)	Laetisha Scanlan	Australia	24	24	48	93 (GR)
1st place, gold medalist(s)	Stacy Roiall	Australia	23	22	45	93 (GR)
2nd place, silver medalist(s)	Abbey Burton	England	24	22	46	91
2nd place, silver medalist(s)	Anita North	England	24	21	45	91
3rd place, bronze medalist(s)	Sue Nattrass	Canada	22	24	46	90
3rd place, bronze medalist(s)	Cynthia Meyes	Canada	22	22	44	90
4	Debbie Bader	Northern Ireland	24	22	46	90
4	Kirsty Barr	Northern Ireland	23	21	44	90
5	Shreyasi Singh	India	23	22	45	89
5	Seema Tomar	India	24	20	44	89
6	Shona Marshall	Scotland	21	25	46	88
6	Linda Pearson	Scotland	18	24	42	88
7	Nadine Stanton	New Zealand	23	22	45	87
7	Natalie Rooney	New Zealand	21	21	42	87
8	Rebecca Madyson	Malta	22	22	44	79
8	Kathryn Cassar	Malta	16	19	35	79
9	Jackie Lewis	Wales	21	20	41	78
9	Cheryl Gizzi	Wales	19	18	37	78
