= Donald McIntosh (sport shooter) =

Scottish sport shooter

Personal information
- Nationality: Scottish
- Born: 19 July 1966 (age 59) Elgin
- Education: Elgin Academy & University of Edinburgh
- Spouse: Shirley McIntosh (1992–present)
- Children: Jennifer McIntosh; Seonaid McIntosh

Sport
- Country: United Kingdom
- Sport: Shooting
- Events: 10 metre air rifle; 50 metre rifle three positions; 50 metre rifle prone
- Club: Clachnacuddin
- Retired: 2003
Medal record
Men's Shooting
Representing Scotland
Commonwealth Championships
| Gold medal – first place | 1999 Auckland | 50m Rifle 3 Positions Pairs |
| Gold medal – first place | 2001 Bisley | 50m Rifle 3 Positions Pairs |

Donald McIntosh (born 19 July 1966) is a Scottish rifle shooter and coach from Elgin. He represented Scotland for the first time in 1989 at the Commonwealth Shooting Federation Championships in Wales. He has been capped 60 times, making him the seventh most capped Scottish shooter. He represented Scotland in the 2002 Manchester Commonwealth Games where he was unable to replicate his previous gold medal success in the Commonwealth Shooting Federation Championships. Donald began his international coaching career at the 2003 World University Shooting Championships and continues to coach his younger daughter Seonaid McIntosh and coached his older daughter Jennifer McIntosh until her retirement in 2018. He is the owner of Edinkillie Sports Services.

== Early life ==
Donald was born in July 1966 in Elgin, Moray. His father was a prominent member of Elgin Miniature Rifle Club and Donald was introduced to shooting at a young age.

== Education ==
He attended Elgin Academy until 1984. He studied Computer Science at the University of Edinburgh (Graduated 1988). He also holds an MSc in Performance Psychology from the University of Edinburgh (2004). He was a prominent member of the University of Edinburgh Rifle Club and was a co-founder of the EU Alumni Club.

== Shooting career ==
Donald's first Scottish Cap was at the 1989 Commonwealth Shooting Federation (European Division) Championships in Wales and he continued on to represent Scotland a further 59 times. He also shot in the Commonwealth Championships in 1997, 1999 and 2001. He won Gold in the 50m 3-Position pairs event in 1999 and 2001 with Martin Sinclair.

Donald has represented Great Britain in the Dewar, Wakefield and Roberts Matches and travelled to Camp Perry as Coach to the Pershing Trophy Team in 2005.

== Coaching career ==
- Assistant Rifle Coach at British Shooting (2005-2009)
- Head Rifle Coach at British Shooting (October 2009 – March 2017)
- Rifle Coach at Scottish Target Shooting (October 2004 – October 2010)
- Programme Manager for Shooting at Scottish Target Shooting then sportscotland Institute of Sport (April 2006 – April 2018)
- Coached and/or Managed Team Scotland at the Melbourne 2006, Delhi 2010, Glasgow 2014 and Gold Coast 2018 Commonwealth Games
- Coached Team GB Rifle at the London 2012, Rio 2016, Tokyo 2020 and Paris 2024 Olympics

As rifle coach and manager of the Scotland shooting team, Donald was selected to give the Coach's Oath at the opening ceremony of the 2014 Commonwealth Games.

== Awards ==
- Inducted into the Scottish Smallbore Rifle Association Hall of Fame 2007.
- Inducted into University of Edinburgh Sports Hall of Fame in 2016.
- Awarded Bob Aitken Service to Shooting Award 2018.
- Awarded Team Scotland Coach of the Year 2019.
