= Joydeep Karmakar =

Indian sport shooter

Joydeep Karmakar OLY
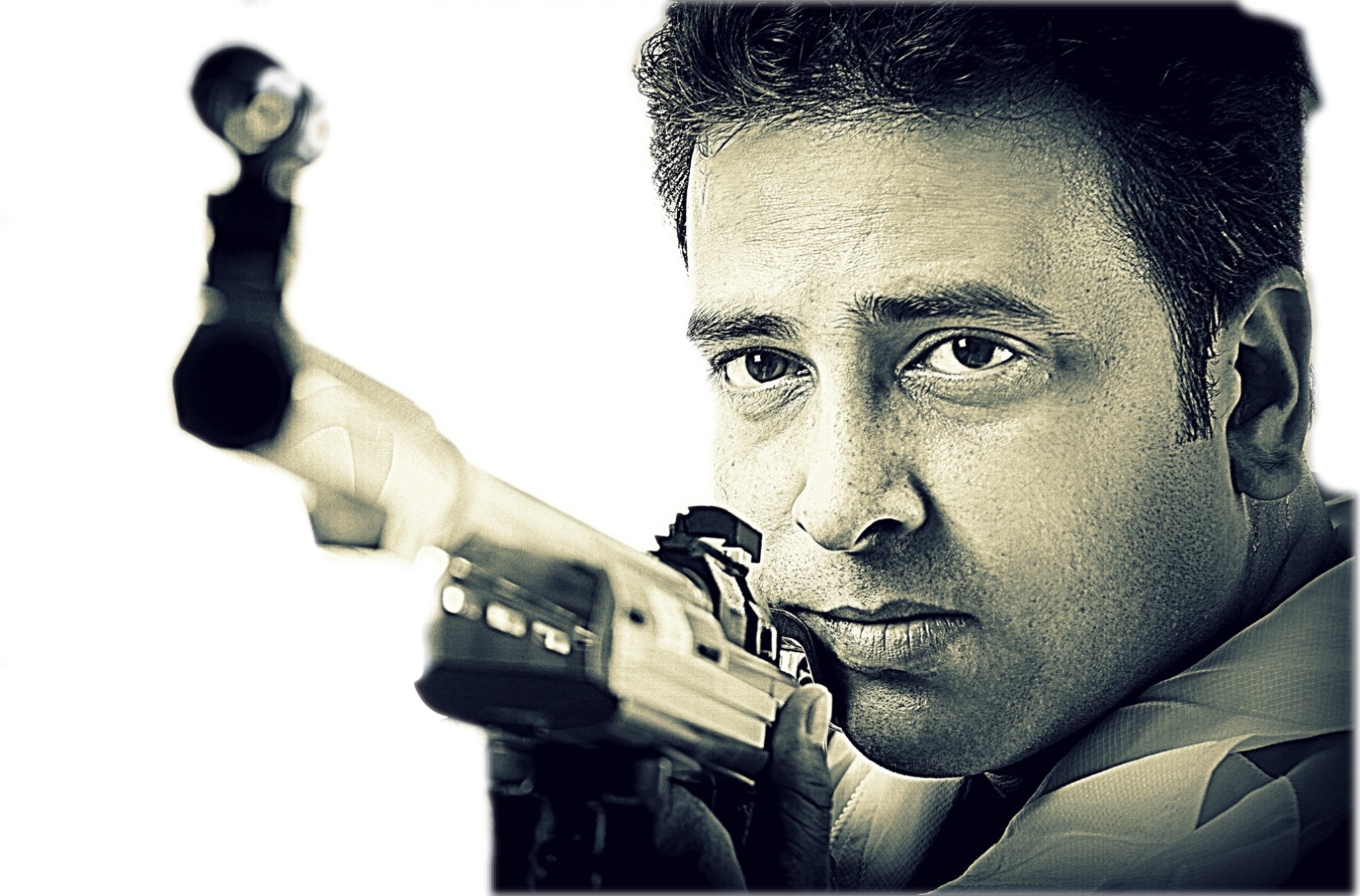

Personal information
- Nationality: Indian
- Born: 7 December 1979 (age 46) Kolkata, West Bengal, India
- Years active: 1994–present
- Height: 177 cm (5 ft 10 in)
- Weight: 73 kg (161 lb)
- Spouse: Radhika Karmakar
- Website: jksa.in

Sport
- Country: India
- Club: North Calcutta Rifle Club
- Now coaching: (India) Mehuli Ghosh (India) Adriyan Karmakar

Achievements and titles
- Olympic finals: 2012 Summer Olympics: 4
- Highest world ranking: 4
Medal record
Men's Shooting
Representing India
World Cup
Silver medal – second place	2010 Sydney	50 meter rifle prone
Commonwealth Championships
Gold medal – first place	2010 New Delhi	50 meter rifle prone pairs

Joydeep Karmakar (Bengali: জয়দীপ কর্মকার; born 7 September 1979) is an Indian sports shooter from Kolkata, West Bengal. Starting his sports career in 1989, he represented India in rifle prone events in various championships. He became a Junior National Champion in his first Nationals in 1994. He has represented India in 28 World Cups, 2 Commonwealth Games, 1 Asian Games and 3 World Championships. Karmakar competed at the 2012 Olympics, where he narrowly missed the podium with a fourth-place finish in the men's 50 metre rifle prone event.

== Career ==
On 3 August 2012, Joydeep qualified for the Olympic Finals of Men's 50 metre Rifle Prone event After six rounds, Joydeep was at joint fourth with eight other shooters. However, there was a shoot off between the nine tied shooters, in which Joydeep scored 51.6 and finished fourth in the shoot off, thereby qualifying for the final round as he finished 7th overall. In the final he scored 104.1 and with a total of 699.1 he finished fourth, behind the bronze medal winner, Rajmond Debevec of Slovenia.

Earlier in 2010 he had participated in ISSF World Cup, Sydney and won a silver medal with an Asian Record score of 599/600. He is still the only silver medalist in World Cup in Prone event from India. His National Record Scores of 594/600, 595, 598 & 599 from 2005 to 2010 was unique as Joydeep only bettered his own record. Apart from more than 70 National Medals, he also won Individual Australian Open Cup, Commonwealth Championships Gold and South Asian double Gold.

In domestic competitions he held the Kumar Surendra Singh record of 597/600 in Prone. He participated in International tournaments till 2015, including 2014 Glasgow Commonwealth Games and 2014 Incheon Asian Games and ISSF World Championships in Granada, Spain.

In late 2015 he set up a shooting academy in Kolkata named JKSA (Joydeep Karmakar Shooting Academy) which include more than 700 shooters. and above 100 champions. at New Town, Kolkata. Later in 2018, he opened the other two branches of JKSA at Ballygunge and Bally, which is named as Shooting Sports Club Howrah, where he with other National & International shooters are training newcomers to the nuances of Rifle Shooting. In 2022 he established another shooting range for the top players in Dumdum. Karmakar is the coach and mentor of 2018 Commonwealth Games and 2018 Summer Youth Olympics silver medallist Mehuli Ghosh.

== Summer Olympics ==
Year	Event	Rank	Score
2012 London	50m rifle prone	4	699.1

In 2012 Summer Olympics Karmakar qualified for the finals of men's 50 metre rifle prone with a score of 595. In the final he scored 104.1 and finished fourth with a total score of 699.1, behind the bronze medal winner, Rajmond Debevec of Slovenia, whose aggregate score was 701.

== Personal life ==
Karmakar was born on 7 December 1979, to Santo Karmakar and Gayatri Karmakar, in Kolkata, West Bengal. His father, Santo Karmakar was a three-time national swimming champion and the well known introducer of sports air pistol in West Bengal. He married Radhika Ghosh Karmakar. His son, Adriyan Karmakar, has also represented India and won silver medal in 50m rifle prone event at Junior World Cup in Suhl, Germany in May 2025.

== Awards and accolades ==
Joydeep Karmakar has received the following awards and accolades:

- Arjuna Award in 2012
- West Bengal Khel Samman Award in 2013–14
- ABP Shera Bangali 2013

== Trained Shooters ==
- Mehuli Ghosh
- Adriyan Karmakar
