= Sheree Cox =

British sport shooter

Personal information
- Born: Sheree Cox; 16 July 1990 (age 35) Ashford, England
- Height: 1.67 m (5 ft 6 in)
- Weight: 65 kg (143 lb)
- Spouse: David Phelps
- Website: podiumtherapies.co.uk

Sport
- Country: United Kingdom
- Sport: Shooting
- Events: 10 metre air rifle; 50 metre rifle three positions; 50 metre rifle prone
- Club: Heston & Hounslow Rifle Club
- Retired: 2016
Medal record
Women's shooting
Representing Great Britain
European Junior Shooting Championships
Silver medal – second place	2008 Plzeň	50m Rifle Prone Team
Representing England
Commonwealth Shooting Championships
Bronze medal – third place	2010 Delhi	10m Air Rifle Team
Commonwealth Youth Games
Gold medal – first place	2008 Pune	50m Rifle 3-Position
Bronze medal – third place	2008 Pune	50m Rifle Prone

Sheree Cox (born 16 July 1990), later known by her married name Sheree Phelps is a female British sports shooter who won medals at the European Junior Shooting Championships and Commonwealth Youth Games, as well as representing England at two Commonwealth Games.

== Personal life ==
Sheree Cox was born in Ashford, Middlesex in 1990. Coming from a family of target shooters, she learned to shoot at Heston & Hounslow Rifle Club. She married fellow GB target shooter David Phelps in 2014.

== Sporting career ==
In 2008 Cox was selected to represent England at the Commonwealth Youth Games in Pune, India where she won gold in the women's 50m 3-position rifle and bronze in the prone rifle event. She was then selected to the GB squad to the European Junior Championships in Plzeň where she won a silver medal with Kay Copland and Nikki Sammels in the 50-metre Prone Rifle team event.

In January 2009 she competed at the Australian Youth Olympic Festival, winning silver in the 50m 3-position rifle event. She went on to win three golds and set a British Junior Record for air rifle at the 2009 InterShoot meeting in the Netherlands.

Cox was selected to represent England in 10metre air rifle at the 2010 Commonwealth Games in New Delhi. At the Commonwealth Shooting Championships ahead of the Games, she won a bronze medal in the Women's Air Rifle Team event.

She was selected again for the 2014 Commonwealth Games in Glasgow. She placed 15th in the Women's 10m Air Rifle event and 16th in the 50metre Three-Position event.

== Post-Sporting Career ==
Following the 2014 Glasgow Games, Cox trained in sports massage, practicing in South Wales.
