= Shirley McIntosh =

Scottish sports shooter

Shirley McIntosh MBE
Personal information
- Nationality: British
- Born: Shirley Smith; 8 July 1965 (age 60) Falkirk, Scotland
- Spouse: Donald McIntosh (1992-Present)

Sport
- Country: United Kingdom
- Sport: Sports shooting
- Events: 10 metre air rifle; 50 metre rifle three positions; 50 metre rifle prone
- Club: Alloa & District
- Retired: September 1998
Medal record
Women's shooting
Representing Scotland
Commonwealth Games
Bronze medal – third place	1998 Kuala Lumpur	50m Rifle 3 Positions Pairs
Bronze medal – third place	1998 Kuala Lumpur	50m Rifle Prone Pairs
Gold medal – first place	1994 Victoria	50m Rifle Prone Individual
Silver medal – second place	1994 Victoria	50m Rifle Prone Pairs
Commonwealth Shooting Championships
Silver medal – second place	1997 Kualu Lumpur	50m Rifle 3 Positions Individual

Shirley McIntosh MBE (born 8 July 1965) is a retired Scottish sports shooter.

== Career ==
McIntosh won a Gold and a Silver in the 1994 Commonwealth Games.

At the 1997 Commonwealth Shooting Championships she won silver in the 50metre three position rifle event.

At the 1998 Commonwealth Games she won Bronze in the Women's 50 metre rifle three position pairs and Bronze in the 50m rifle prone pairs, making her the second Scottish Woman to win four Commonwealth Games medals.

McIntosh is the mother of five-times Scottish Commonwealth Games medalist Jennifer McIntosh and double Olympian Seonaid McIntosh.

McIntosh was appointed Member of the Order of the British Empire (MBE) in the 1996 New Year Honours for services to shooting.

McIntosh was inducted into the University of Edinburgh Sports Hall of Fame in 2011 and into the Scottish Sports Hall of Fame in 2015.
