= Zoe Bruce =

British sport shooter

Personal information
- Full name: Zoe Anne Bruce
- Nationality: British
- Born: 15 October 1975 (age 50)

Sport
- Country: Great Britain
- Sport: Shooting
- Events: 10 metre air rifle; 50 metre rifle three positions; 50 metre rifle prone
Medal record
Representing Great Britain
World Championships
Bronze medal – third place	2018 Changwon	50 m team rifle prone

Zoe Anne Bruce (born 15 October 1975) is a British sport shooter, World Championship medallist and former British record holder.

In May 2017, Bruce won the Women's 50m prone rifle at the International Shooting Competition of Hannover, setting a new British and English Record of 624.3. The British record was broken less than a month later by the Scot Seonaid McIntosh, but Bruce retains the English record. In July 2018, she was selected as a member of the Great Britain team to the 2018 ISSF World Shooting Championships where she won a bronze medal in the Women's 50m prone rifle team event with her teammates Jennifer McIntosh and Seonaid McIntosh. This was the first Senior World Championship medal won by Great Britain in a 50 metre rifle event since 1982.
