= Martin Sinclair =

Martin Sinclair may refer to:

- Martin Sinclair (footballer) (born 1986), British Paralympic footballer
- Martin Sinclair (sport shooter), British sport shooter
