= Shooting at the 2010 Commonwealth Games – Women's trap singles =

The Women's trap singles event took place on 9 October 2010 at the CRPF Campus. There was a qualification held to determine the final participants.

== Results ==
Rank	Name	Country	Round 1	Round 2	Round 3	Final	Total
1st place, gold medalist(s)	Anita North	England	24	22	25	22	93 (FGR)
2nd place, silver medalist(s)	Shona Marshall	Scotland	23	21	24	23	91
3rd place, bronze medalist(s)	Gaby Ahrens	Namibia	24	23	21	20	88
4	Nadine Stanton	New Zealand	21	22	24	20	87
5	Natalie Rooney	New Zealand	21	25	24	15	85^{+2}
6	Shreyasi Singh	India	24	22	24	15	85^{+1}
