= Mairaj Ahmad Khan =

Indian skeet shooter (born 1975)

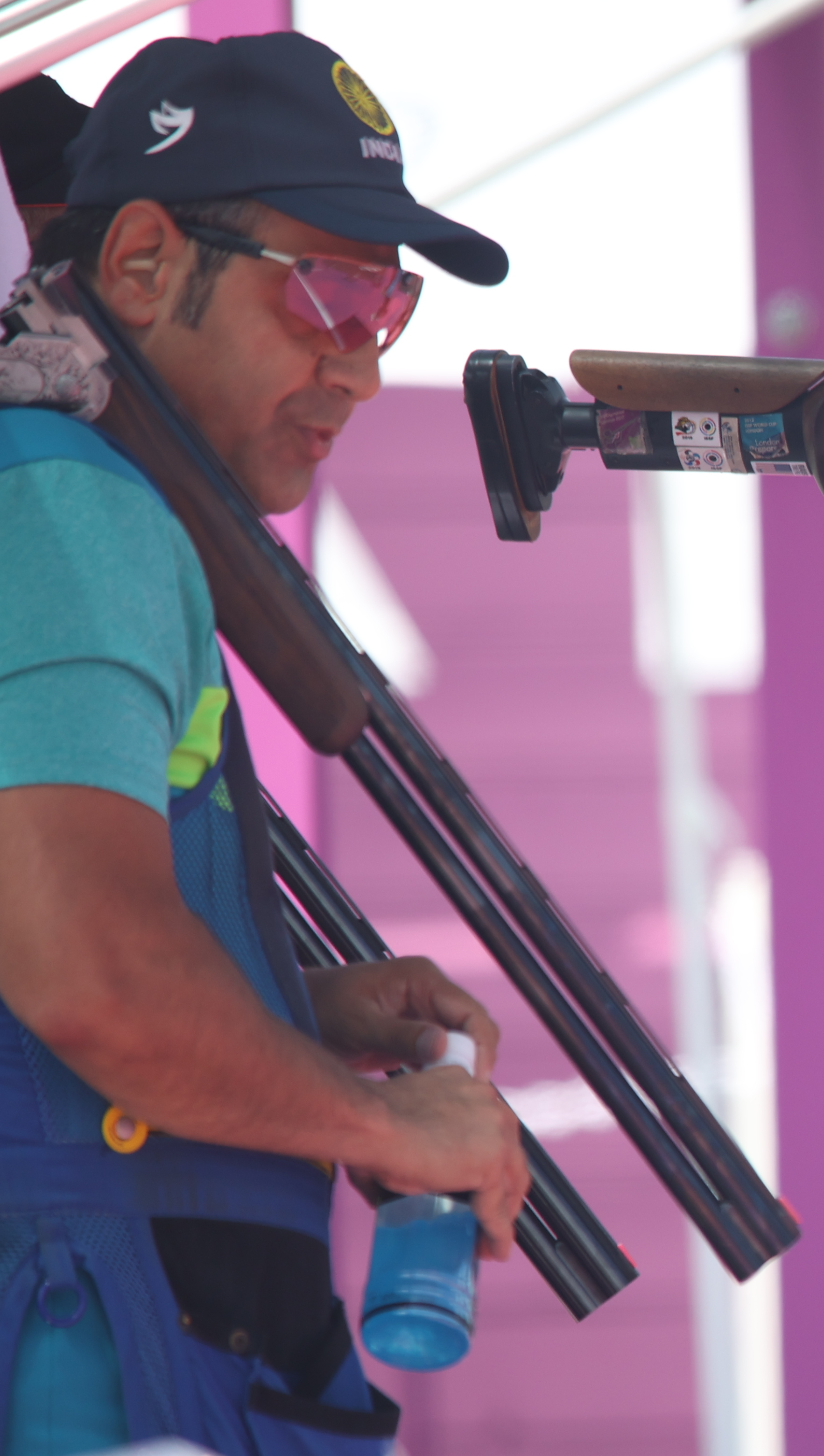
- Khan at the 2020 Tokyo Olympics

Personal information
- Born: 2 November 1975 (age 50) Khurja, Uttar Pradesh, India
- Years active: 2003–present

Sport
- Sport: Shooting
- Event: Skeet
Medal record
Men's skeet shooting
Representing India
World Cup
Gold medal – first place	2021 New Delhi	Team
Gold medal – first place	2022 Changwon	Individual
Gold medal – first place	2023 Cairo	Mixed team
Silver medal – second place	2016 Rio de Janeiro	Individual
Bronze medal – third place	2021 Cairo	Team
Asian Games
Bronze medal – third place	2026 Aichi–Nagoya	Team
Asian Championships
Gold medal – first place	2011 Kuala Lumpur	Team
Silver medal – second place	2012 Patiala	Team
Silver medal – second place	2019 Doha	Individual
Bronze medal – third place	2016 Abu Dhabi	Individual
Bronze medal – third place	2016 Abu Dhabi	Team
Bronze medal – third place	2017 Astana	Team
Commonwealth Championships
Gold medal – first place	2010 New Delhi	Pairs
Silver medal – second place	2010 New Delhi	Individual
South Asian Championships
Silver medal – second place	2009 Dhaka	Individual
Silver medal – second place	2009 Dhaka	Team

Mairaj Ahmad Khan (born 2 November 1975) is an Indian skeet shooter and two-time Olympian. He has won gold medals at the World Cup, Asian Championships, and Commonwealth Championships.

== Early life ==
Khan was born on 2 November 1975 in an affluent Kheshgi-Sunni landlord family in Khurja, Uttar Pradesh, India. His father, brother and uncles were state-level trap shooters. At age 10, he placed third in a U12 50 m rifle competition and used his prize money to buy a cricket bat. He developed an interest in cricket during his childhood and played as a top-order batsman. He eventually captained the Uttar Pradesh U19 team in the 1990s. Khan made his college team and played alongside former Indian international Virender Sehwag for Jamia Millia Islamia, and also played the Vizzy Trophy and C. K. Nayudu Trophy. He returned to shooting in 1994 as a shotgun shooter before specialising in skeet from 2000.

== Career ==
Khan's first international competition was the 2003 World Cup in Lonato, Italy. He has participated in a number of regional, national, and world competitions, including the World Cup, (2000, 2003, 2005–2011, 2013–2016, 2021–2023) Commonwealth Championships (2010), Commonwealth Games (2010, 2014), Asian Games (2006, 2010, 2014), Asian Championships (2004, 2007–2009, 2011–2014, 2016–2017, 2019), and the South Asian Championships (2009).

In 2016, Khan became the first ever Indian skeet shooter to qualify for the Olympics. At the Rio Olympics, he finished in 9th in the qualification round and did not advance into the final. He also finished 25th at the Tokyo Olympics.

In 2022 in Changwon, he became the first Indian skeet shooter to win a gold medal at the World Cup. This came as a surprise to Khan, who almost quit shooting after his father's death in 2021.

== Coaching ==
His coaches throughout his career have included Andrea Benelli, Sunny Thomas, Ennio Falco, and Riccardo Filippelli.

Khan also runs an NGO called MAK Shooting Foundation, which trains future shooting talent. He coached Angad Vir Singh Bajwa.
