= David Phelps (sport shooter) =

Welsh sport shooter

Personal information
- Nationality: (Wales) Welsh
- Citizenship: British
- Born: 10 April 1977 (age 49) Cardiff, Wales
- Years active: 1995 – 2018
- Spouse: Sheree Cox (m. 2014)
- Other interests: Archery
- Website: Official website

Sport
- Sport: Shooting sport
- Event: 50 metre rifle prone
Medal record
Commonwealth Games
Representing Wales
Gold medal – first place	2006 Melbourne	Men's 50m Rifle Prone (Singles)
Bronze medal – third place	2006 Melbourne	Men's 50m Rifle Prone (Pairs)
Gold medal – first place	2018 Gold Coast	Men's 50m Rifle Prone (Singles)

David Phelps (born 10 April 1977) is a Welsh sport shooter, who won Gold in the 50 meter rifle prone individual competition and Bronze in the corresponding pairs event for Wales at the 2006 Commonwealth Games. He went on to win individual Gold in the event at the 2018 Commonwealth Games.

== History ==
Phelps comes from Cardiff in Wales. In August 2014, he married England Commonwealth rifle shooter Sheree Cox.

== Career ==
In 2000 and 2001, Phelps won back-to-back British Prone Championships at the NSRA National Meeting.

Phelps was selected for his first Commonwealth Games in 2002 where he qualified for the final in the Men's 50M Prone Rifle, finishing 6th. He finished 11th in the Men's Prone Rifle Pairs with team-mate Robin Hilborne. Four years later he earned selection for the 2006 Commonwealth Games, by which time he was representing Great Britain at World Cup level. On 22 March 2006, Phelps claimed Gold in the men's singles prone rifle event, with a score of 698.3. He followed this with a Bronze in the pairs prone rifle event with teammate Gruffudd Morgan.

Phelps was selected again for the Commonwealth Games in 2010, in the singles and paired prone rifle (paired this time with Jamie Dummer), but failed to qualify for the final. In 2014 Phelps saw his fourth selection for Wales to the 2014 Commonwealth Games in Glasgow where he finished twelfth in the Prone Rifle.

In January 2018 Phelps' fifth Commonwealth Selection was announced ahead of the Gold Coast Commonwealth Games. He went on to win Gold in the Men's Prone Rifle, which was contested on his 41st birthday.

=== Post-Shooting Career ===
After retirement from competitive shooting, Phelps became involved in sports management and coaching, working for the Welsh Target Shooting Federation. In 2022 he was a member of the Team Wales support group to the Birmingham Commonwealth Games. In 2023 he was appointed to the Team Wales Athletes Commission. In 2024 he was appointed coach to the British team for the 2025 Roberts Match between Britain and the USA. In August 2025 Britain won for the first time in 16 years.

Phelps was inducted into the Welsh Sports Hall of Fame on the 25th June 2026. As inductee #214 Phelps was only the second shooting athlete to be inducted, the other being Lord Swansea.
