= Seonaid McIntosh =

British sport shooter (born 1996)

Seonaid McIntosh OLY
Personal information
- Nickname: Mini Mac
- Born: 15 March 1996 (age 30) Edinburgh, Scotland
- Education: Dollar Academy, University of Edinburgh, Heriot-Watt University and University of Strathclyde
- Height: 1.73 m (5 ft 8 in)

Sport
- Country: United Kingdom
- Sport: Shooting
- Events: 10 metre air rifle; 10 metre air rifle mixed team; 50 metre rifle three positions; 50 metre rifle prone; 300 metre rifle three positions; 300 metre rifle prone
- Club: Alloa & District
- Coached by: Donald McIntosh
Medal record
Women's shooting
Representing Great Britain
World Championships
| Gold medal – first place | 2018 Changwon | 50 m rifle prone |
| Silver medal – second place | 2026 Doha | 50 m rifle prone |
| Bronze medal – third place | 2018 Changwon | 50 m rifle prone team |
| Bronze medal – third place | 2025 Cairo | 50 m rifle 3 positions |
World Cup Final
| Gold medal – first place | 2019 Putian | 50 m rifle 3 positions |
| Silver medal – second place | 2025 Doha | 50 m rifle 3 positions |
| Bronze medal – third place | 2019 Putian | 10 m air rifle mixed team |
World Cup
| Silver medal – second place | 2019 Munich | 50 m rifle 3 positions |
| Gold medal – first place | 2019 Rio de Janeiro | 50 m rifle 3 positions |
| Silver medal – second place | 2019 Rio de Janeiro | 10 m air rifle |
| Gold medal – first place | 2023 Cairo | 10 m air rifle |
| Gold medal – first place | 2023 Baku | 50 m rifle 3 positions |
| Gold medal – first place | 2024 Cairo | 10 m air rifle mixed team |
| Gold medal – first place | 2024 Cairo | 50 m rifle 3 positions |
| Gold medal – first place | 2024 Baku | 50 m rifle 3 positions |
| Gold medal – first place | 2024 Munich | 50 m rifle 3 positions |
| Gold medal – first place | 2026 Hangzhou | 50 m rifle 3 positions |
| Silver medal – second place | 2026 Munich | 50 m rifle 3 positions |
European Games
| Bronze medal – third place | 2023 Kraków-Małopolska | 50 m rifle 3 positions |
European Championships
| Gold medal – first place | 2017 Baku | 50 m rifle 3 positions |
| Gold medal – first place | 2017 Baku | 50m Rifle Three Positions - Women's Team |
| Gold medal – first place | 2019 Tolmezzo | 300 m rifle prone |
| Silver medal – second place | 2015 Arnhem | 10 m air rifle junior |
| Silver medal – second place | 2023 Tallinn | 10 m air rifle |
| Bronze medal – third place | 2019 Bologna | 50 m rifle prone mixed team |
| Silver medal – second place | 2026 Osijek | 300 m rifle 3 positions |
| Bronze medal – third place | 2026 Osijek | 50 m rifle 3 positions |
Representing Scotland
Commonwealth Games
| Bronze medal – third place | 2018 Gold Coast | 50 m rifle prone |
| Bronze medal – third place | 2018 Gold Coast | 50 m rifle 3 positions |
Commonwealth Championships
| Gold medal – first place | 2017 Brisbane | 50 m rifle 3 positions |
| Silver medal – second place | 2017 Brisbane | 50 m rifle prone |

Seonaid McIntosh (born 15 March 1996) is a British sports shooter who became the World Champion at the 2018 ISSF World Shooting Championships in the 50m Prone Rifle event. In 2019 she became Britain's most successful female rifle shooter of all time, winning five World Cup medals (including the first World Cup Gold to be won by a British Woman). She also became the first British Woman to rank World #1 for the 50m Rifle Three Position event and became European Champion in the 300m Rifle Prone event with an equal World Record score.

McIntosh is the daughter of four-times Commonwealth Games medallist Shirley McIntosh and sport shooter Donald McIntosh. She is the younger sister of British Olympian Jennifer McIntosh. In 2017 she won the Women's 3x20 Rifle event at the 2017 European Shooting Championships in Baku, becoming European Champion. Sister Jennifer had also won the Women's 50m Prone Rifle earlier in the week, becoming European Champion in that event.

== Education ==
McIntosh attended Dollar Academy.

She completed a Bachelor’s Degree in Electrical and Electronic Engineering at Heriot-Watt University, before completing a Postgraduate Diploma in Performance Psychology at the University of Edinburgh in 2021. In 2022 McIntosh graduated with a Masters in Biomedical Engineering from the University of Strathclyde.

== Shooting career ==
Seonaid shot at school (Dollar Academy) and club level and did not harbour international ambitions until sister Jennifer's success at the 2010 Commonwealth Games and attendance at the 2012 Summer Olympics. Whilst a pupil at Dollar Academy she was a member of the school's winning team in the NRA's 2013 Ashburton Shield competition, as well as individually winning the School's Hundred that year.

After beginning training in earnest in November 2012, she placed 11th in the Junior Women's 50 Metre Prone Rifle at the ISSF World Shooting Championships – her first major international. At the 2015 10M European Championships in Arnhem she won Silver in the Junior Women's 10 metre Air Rifle, making her the first British Junior in 35 years to medal at a European Championship, and setting a new British Under-21s Record.

At the 2014 Commonwealth Games, she competed in the 10 metre air rifle event, placing 19th.

In November 2017, Seonaid was selected for Scotland's team for the 2018 Commonwealth Games At the Games she qualified in the 10m Air Rifle in 7th place, placing 5th in the Final. In the 50m Prone Rifle she won the bronze medal, and in the 50m Rifle Three Positions qualified 6th, working up to win the bronze medal in the Final. As of 2016 was Seonaid enrolled on the British Shooting World Class Performance Programme, working towards Tokyo 2020.

At the 2018 ISSF World Shooting Championships, McIntosh won the Women's Prone 50m Rifle event becoming World Champion, she went on to place fourth in the Women's 3x40 Rifle, earning a Quota Place for the 2020 Summer Olympics in Tokyo.

In May 2019 McIntosh won a silver medal at the Munich leg of the 2019 ISSF World Cup in the Women's 3x40 Rifle event, earning herself a place at the World Cup Final. She was not allocated an Olympic Quota Place however having already won one at the World Championships. This was the first Rifle World Cup Medal a GB shooter had won since Kenneth Parr won a silver medal for Prone in the 2016 ISSF World Cup, and the first Women's medal since Louise Minett won a Silver in 10m Air Rifle at the 1999 Atlanta World Cup.

In August at the Rio de Janeiro leg of the World Cup McIntosh won Silver in the Women's 10m Air Rifle. She went on to win Gold in the Women's 3x40 Rifle, becoming the first British Woman to win a World Cup Gold Medal. This result moved her from fourth to first in the ISSF World Rankings for Three Position Rifle in the September 2019 Rankings, making her the first British Woman to be ranked World #1.

At the European Championships in September 2019 Seonaid won Bronze in the 50m Prone Rifle Mixed Team (Pairs) event with teammate Kenneth Parr. She went on to win Gold in the 300m Prone Rifle, equalling the World Record with a score of 599(ex600).

McIntosh was studying for an MSc Performance Psychology at the University of Edinburgh when the British teams were announced for the postponed 2020 Summer Olympics in Tokyo. In addition to McIntosh's inclusion on this team, the other British women shooters bound for Tokyo were Olympian Kirsty Hegarty (women’s Olympic trap) and Paralympians Lorraine Lambert, Issy Bailey and Lesley Stewart.

In February 2023, McIntosh won the 10m Air Rifle event at the second stage of the 2023 ISSF World Cup in Cairo. This made her the first British athlete to win a World Cup Gold Medal in the air rifle event. Her qualification score of 634.0 was a Personal Best and new British Record.

In March 2023 she won silver at the European 10Metre Championships in Tallinn, Estonia. This earned British Shooting a quota place to the 2024 Olympic Games in Paris.

In May 2023 she won a gold medal in the 50M Three Position event at the ISSF World Cup in Baku, setting a world record. In June she won a bronze medal in the Three Position event at the 3rd European Games in Poland. Her qualification score of 591 was a new British record.

At the 2024 ISSF World Cup in Cairo, McIntosh won gold in the 10m Air Rifle Mixed Pairs with teammate Dean Bale, scoring 10.9 on her final shot. In the 50m Three Position Rifle, she won gold at three of the four World Cup matches (Cairo, Baku 2 and Munich), placing fourth at the first Baku event.

At the 2024 Paris Olympic Games, she finished 26th in the Mixed Team Air Rifle paired with Mike Bargeron, 37th in the Women's Air Rifle and 12th in the Women's Three-Position Rifle.

Following the Paris Olympic Games, McIntosh took a break from shooting, returning to competition in 2025 World Championships where she won a bronze medal in the Women's 50m Three Positions Rifle event.

In 2026, she secured gold and silver ISSF World Cup medals in Hangzhou and Munich. At the 2026 European Shooting Championships, McIntosh won silver in the 300m three-position rifle and bronze in the 50m three-position rifle.

Current world records held in 300 metre rifle prone
| Women (ISSF) | Individual | 599 | Charlotte Jakobsen (DEN); Bettina Bucher (SWI); Charlotte Jakobsen (DEN); Seonaid McIntosh (GBR) | 21 July 2009; 9 August 2010; 23 September 2019; 24 September 2019 | Osijek (CRO); Munich (GER); Tolmezzo (ITA); Tolmezzo (ITA) |
