= Kavita Yadav =

Indian sport shooter (born 1986)

Personal information
- Nationality: Indian
- Born: 1986 (age 39–40) Bangalore, India
Medal record
Women's shooting
Representing India
Commonwealth Games
| Bronze medal – third place | 2010 Delhi | 10 m air rifle pairs |

Kavita Yadav (born 1986 in Bangalore) is an Indian woman sport shooter who won the bronze medal in Women's 10 m Air Rifle (Pairs) in 2010 Commonwealth Games.

She is from Karnataka.
