= Martin Sinclair (sport shooter) =

British sport shooter

Personal information
- Nationality: British

Sport
- Country: United Kingdom
- Sport: Shooting sport
- Events: 50 metre rifle prone; 50 metre rifle three positions
- Club: E U Alumni

Achievements and titles
- Regional finals: 1999 Commonwealth Shooting Championships: 50 m rifle 3 positions pairs – Gold; 2001 Commonwealth Shooting Championships: 50 m rifle 3 positions pairs – Gold; 2005 Commonwealth Shooting Championships: 50 m rifle prone pairs – Silver
Medal record
Men's shooting
Representing Scotland
Commonwealth Games
Silver medal – second place	2006 Melbourne	50 m rifle prone pairs
- Updated on 4 September 2012

Martin Sinclair is a British sport shooter who won silver at the 2006 Commonwealth Games in the 50 m rifle prone pairs partnering with Neil Stirton. He was a member of the University of Edinburgh Rifle Club whilst studying at the University of Edinburgh. He won Gold in the 50m 3-Position Pairs even at the 1999 Commonwealth Championships with partner Donald McIntosh.
