= Kay Copland =

Scottish sport shooter

Personal information
- Nationality: Scottish

Sport
- Country: Scotland
- Sport: Shooting
Medal record
Women's shooting
Representing Great Britain
European Junior Shooting Championships
Silver medal – second place	2008 Plzeň	50m Rifle Prone Team
Representing Scotland
Commonwealth Games
Gold medal – first place	2010 Delhi	50m prone pairs
Bronze medal – third place	2010 Delhi	50m three positions pairs
Commonwealth Youth Games
Gold medal – first place	2008 Pune	50m Rifle Prone

Kay Copland is a Scottish sport shooter.

Copland competed at the 2010 Commonwealth Games winning a gold medal in the 50m prone pairs event and a bronze medal in the 50m three positions pairs event, both alongside Jennifer McIntosh.

In October 2008 she won gold in the 50 metre prone rifle at the Commonwealth Youth Games in Pune, India. Later in 2008 she won a silver medal with Sheree Cox and Nikki Sammels in the 50 metre Prone Rifle team event at the European Junior Championships in Plzeň.
