= Nick Baxter (sport shooter) =

British sport shooter (born 1971)

Personal information
- Full name: Nicholas James Baxter
- Nationality: English
- Born: 18 March 1971 (age 55) Maulden, Bedfordshire
Medal record
Sports shooting
Representing England
Commonwealth Games
Gold medal – first place	1998 Kuala Lumpur	10m air pistol pair
Gold medal – first place	1998 Kuala Lumpur	50m free pistol pair
Gold medal – first place	2002 Manchester	10m air pistol pair
Silver medal – second place	2006 Melbourne	10m air pistol pair
Bronze medal – third place	2006 Melbourne	50m free pistol pair
Silver medal – second place	2010 Delhi	10m air pistol pair

Nicholas James Baxter (born 18 March 1971) is a male British sport shooter.

== Sport shooting career ==
Baxter represented England at four consecutive Commonwealth Games in 1998, 2002, 2006 and 2010. The appearances resulted in the winning three gold medals, two silver medals and one bronze medal.

Two of the three gold medals came representing England at the 1998 Commonwealth Games in Kuala Lumpur, Malaysia, in the 10 metres air pistol pair and 50 metres free pistol pair. Four years later in 2002 he won a third gold in the 10 metres air pistol pair. All three golds were won while partnering Mick Gault. In 2010, Baxter partnered again with Mick Gault for the 2010 Commonwealth Games in Delhi, and they won a silver medal.
