= Peter Kirkbride =

Scottish weightlifter

Personal information
- Nationality: British
- Born: 19 December 1987 (age 37); Irvine, North Ayrshire, Scotland
- Height: 1.89 m (6 ft 2 in)
- Weight: 94 kg (207 lb)

Sport
- Country: Great Britain; Scotland
- Sport: Weightlifting
- Event: –94 kg
- Club: Kilmarnock WLC
- Coached by: Charles Hamilton
- Updated on 14 August 2012

Peter Kirkbride (born 19 December 1987 in Irvine, North Ayrshire) is a Scottish weightlifter. Kirkbride won a silver medal in weightlifting at the 2010 Commonwealth Games and was selected to represent Britain at the 2012 Summer Olympics in the men's 94 kg division, where he finished in 16th place. His placing was later increased to 8th overall, following failed retroactive doping tests.
