= Alethea Sedgman =

Australian sport shooter

Personal information
- Full name: Alethea Nevada Sedgman
- Nationality: Australian
- Born: 24 January 1994 (age 32) Carlton, Victoria, Australia
- Height: 1.79 m (5 ft 10 in) (2012)
- Weight: 65 kg (143 lb) (2012)

Sport
- Country: Australia
- Sport: Sport shooting
- Club: Horsham Smallbore Club
- Coached by: Petr Kůrka
Medal record
Women's shooting
Representing Australia
Commonwealth Games
Gold medal – first place	2010 Delhi	50 m rifle 3 positions single

Alethea Nevada Sedgman (born 24 January 1994) is an Australian sport shooter. At the 2010 Commonwealth Games, she won a gold medal in the women's 50 metres rifle three position event. She was selected to represent Australia at the 2012 Summer Olympics in the 10 metres air rifle event and the 50m rifle event.

== Personal ==
Sedgman was born on 24 January 1994 in Carlton, Victoria. She grew up in Victoria on a farm. She attended Natimuk Primary School before going to high school at Horsham College. In 2010, she earned her VCE in English literature. As of 2012, she lives in Natimuk, Victoria.

Sedgman is 179 centimetres (5 ft 10 in) tall and weighs 65 kilograms (143 lb).

== Shooting ==
Sedgman is a sport shooter, specialising in the rifle. She is a member of the Horsham Smallbore Club and has been coached by Petr Kůrka since 2009. She has a shooting scholarship with the Victorian Institute of Sport. She became a senior shooter in 2009. She represented Australia at the 2010 World Championship in Munich.

Sedgman competed at the 2010 Commonwealth Games, where she earned a gold medal as a sixteen-year-old in the women's 50m rifle three position event. Her gold was Australia's first in shooting at the 2010 Games. She won gold with a score of 676.0 points.

Sedgman finished 2nd in the three position and 4th in the prone 10 metres air rifle at the 2011 Oceania Championships in Sydney, Australia. She finished 23rd and 24th in the junior 10 metres air rifle events at the 2012 Plzeň Grand Prix in Plzeň, Czech Republic. At the 2012 Meyton Cup in Tirol, Austria, she finished 4th and 18th in the junior 10 metres rifle events. She finished 42nd in the junior 10 metres air rifle at the 2012 Munich IWK in Munich Germany. In the 2012 Australia Cup 1 she finished 2nd in the 10 metres air rifle at Event 2 in Adelaide, Australia having placed 1st in the same event and 3rd in the three positions at Event 1, also in Adelaide. In the 2012 Australia Cup 2 Sedgman recorded finishes of 2nd in the 10 metres air rifle and 4th in the three positions at Event 1 in Sydney and followed this by finishing 2nd in the 10 metres at Event 2.

=== Olympics ===
Sedgman was selected to represent Australia at the 2012 Summer Olympics in shooting in the 10 metres air rifle event. She was eighteen years old at the Games.

Australia had one final quota place to give to a shooter for the Olympics and it came down a choice between Gulvin and Sedgman. Sedgman was selected ahead of her boyfriend as Australian International Shooting opted to send a female competitor.
