= European Junior Shooting Championships =

International sport shooting competition

The European Junior Shooting Championships are the main shooting championships in Europe organize by European Shooting Confederation (ESC).

== European Junior Shooting Championships (25, 50, Running Target) ==
Number	Year	City	Country	Events	Notes
1	1984	Vingsted	Denmark	8	25, 50
2	1986	Budapest	Hungary	10	25, 50
3	1988	Joensuu	Finland	10	25, 50, Running Target
4	1990	Zenica	Yugoslavia	10	25, 50, Running Target
5	1992	Sofia	Bulgaria	8	25, 50
6	1994	Wrocław	Poland	10	25, 50, Running Target
7	1996	Sofia	Bulgaria	8	25, 50
8	1998	Copenhagen	Denmark	8	25, 50
9	2000	Plzeň	Czech Republic	10	25, 50, Running Target
10	2004	Munich	Germany	10	25, 50, Running Target
11	2008	Plzeň	Czech Republic	10	25, 50, Running Target
12	2012	Bologna	Italy	9	25, 50
13	2016	Tallinn	Estonia	9	25, 50

== Results ==
- http://www.issf-sports.org/competitions/historicalmedalwinners.ashx
- http://www.issf-sports.org/competitions/results.ashx
- https://results.sius.com/Championships.aspx
- http://www.esc-shooting.org/documents/results/
- http://www.esc-shooting.org/documents/european_championships/
- http://www.the-sports.org/shooting-sports-european-shotgun-and-running-target-championships-2018-epr84349.html

== See also ==
- List of medalists at the European Shooting Championship
