= Linda Ryan (sport shooter) =

Australian sports shooter (born 1966)

Personal information
- Full name: Linda Maree Ryan
- Nationality: Australia
- Born: 25 August 1966 (age 60) Brisbane, Australia
- Height: 1.66 m (5 ft 5 1/2 in)
- Weight: 53 kg (117 lb)

Sport
- Sport: Shooting
- Events: 10 m air pistol (AP40); 25 m pistol (SP)
- Club: Outtrim Pistol Club
- Coached by: Anatoliy Babushkin
Medal record
Women's shooting
Representing Australia
Commonwealth Games
Gold medal – first place	2002 Manchester	25 m sport pistol pairs
Silver medal – second place	2002 Manchester	25 m sport pistol
Silver medal – second place	2010 Delhi	25 m sport pistol pairs

Linda Maree Ryan (born 25 August 1966 in Brisbane) is an Australian sport shooter. She has been selected to compete for Australia in two editions of the Olympic Games (2000 and 2004), and has collected a total of thirteen medals in a major international competition, spanning the ISSF World Cup series, the Oceanian Championships, and the Commonwealth Games. Ryan also trains under head coach Anatoliy Babushkin for the national team, while shooting at her home club, Outtrim Pistol Club in South Gippsland, Victoria.

Ryan's Olympic debut came as part of the host nation team in pistol shooting when Australia hosted the 2000 Summer Olympics in Sydney. There, she finished in a three-way tie with U.S. shooter Christina Cassidy and Georgia's Nino Uchadze for twenty-eighth place in the qualifying round of the women's air pistol, shooting a total of 375 points. Ryan had also eluded from her dramatic air pistol aim to fire a much brilliant 579 (290 in precision and 289 in the rapid fire) for an eleventh-place tie with three other shooters, including 1988 Olympic champion Nino Salukvadze of Georgia in the sport pistol, but her qualifying score was not good enough for her to surpass the final cutoff by two points.

In 2002, Ryan showed her most potential form in bouncing back to the range at the Commonwealth Games in Manchester, England, claiming her first individual silver medal in sport pistol. She also set a new Games record with a combined score of 1150 to share a superb victory with former Belarusian shooter and 2000 Olympic bronze medalist Lalita Yauhleuskaya in the pairs.

At the 2004 Summer Olympics in Athens, Ryan qualified for her second Australian team only in the women's 10 m air pistol. She beat her fellow markswoman and 2000 Olympic bronze medalist Annemarie Forder at the Olympic trials in Sydney to snatch the Olympic quota place that the latter won from the Oceanian Championships in Auckland, having registered a minimum qualifying score of 380. She fired a substandard 376 out of a possible 400 to force in a two-way tie with Iran's Nasim Hassanpour for twenty-eighth in a field of forty-one shooters, matching her position from the previous Games.
