= Anita North =

English sport shooter

Personal information
- Born: 10 January 1963 (age 63)
Medal record
Women's shooting
Representing England
Commonwealth Games
Silver medal – second place	2010 Delhi	Trap pairs

Anita North (born 10 January 1963) is a clay-pigeon shooter representing England.

North earned silver medals in the trap singles and pairs at the 2002 Commonwealth Games in Manchester in 2002, but missed out on a place in the team for Melbourne in 2006 by one shot. She won her second silver medal of the Commonwealth Games at Bisley, Surrey, finishing just one shot behind Canadian gold medallist Cynthia Meyer in the women's trap singles final. North hit 94 targets to Meyer's 95 in the final.

In 2010 North earned selection for the England shooting team for the 2010 Commonwealth Games in Delhi from 3–14 October 2010. She won Silver when competing in the women’s trap pairs, with partner Abbey Burton, and Gold in the singles event.
