= Meena Kumari (sport shooter) =

Indian sport shooter (born 1983)

Personal information
- Nationality: Indian
- Born: 17 July 1983 (age 42) Raghunathpura, Himachal Pradesh
- Height: 156 cm (5 ft 1 in)

Sport
- Country: India
- Sport: Shooting
- Event: 50m Rifle Prone Women
Medal record
Women's shooting
Representing India
Commonwealth Games
Bronze medal – third place	2010 Delhi	50 m rifle prone pairs

Meena Kumari (born 17 July 1983) is an Indian shooter. She is from Bilaspur district of Himachal Pradesh.

She along with Tejaswini Sawant won a bronze medal in at the 2010 Commonwealth Games. They secured the bronze after losing by just a margin of one point.

In the Commonwealth Games 2014, Meena finished sixth with a score of 615.3 points in the women's 50-metre rifle prone finals at the Barry Buddon Shooting Centre. She finished fourth with a score of 586 at the 2010 Asian Games held at the Aoti Range in Guangzhou.
