= Shona Marshall =

Scottish sport shooter

Personal information
- Born: June 27, 1964 (age 62) Aberdeen, Scotland

Sport
- Country: Scotland
- Sport: Shooting
Medal record
Commonwealth Games
Silver medal – second place	2010 Delhi	women's trap singles

Shona Marshall (born 27 June 1964) is a Scottish sport shooter.

Marshall won a silver medal at the 2010 Commonwealth Games in the women's trap singles event. She also competed at the 2006 Commonwealth Games and 2014 Commonwealth Games.
