= Johanne Brekke =

Welsh sport shooter (born 1978)

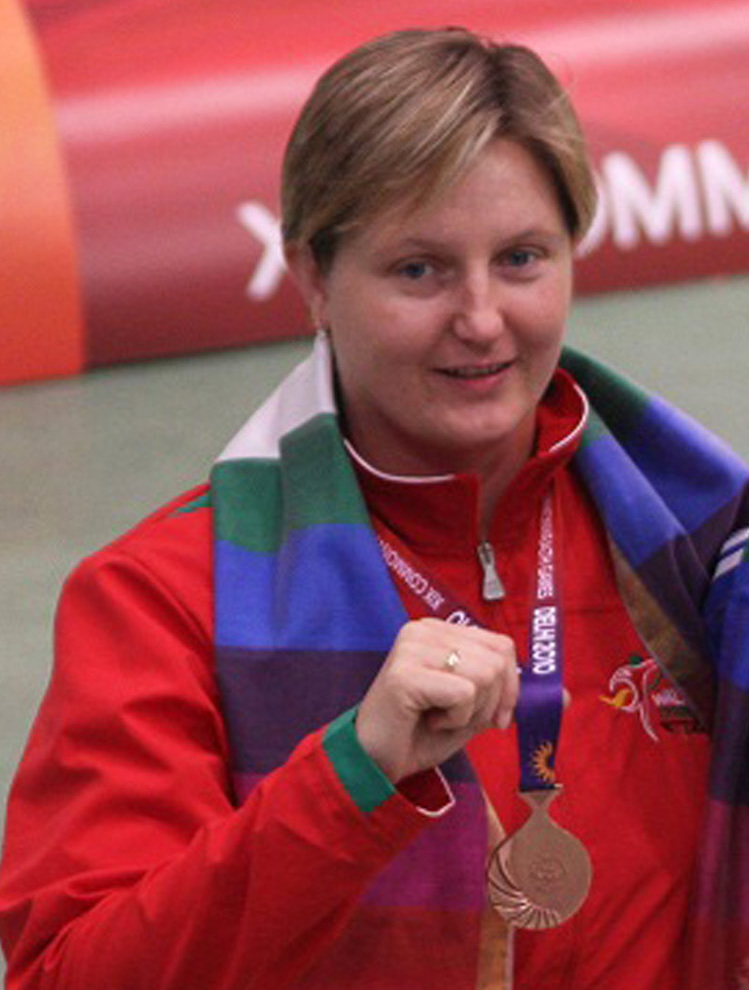
- Brekke at the 2010 Commonwealth Games

Personal information
- Nationality: Welsh
- Born: 11 August 1978 (age 47)

Sport
- Country: Wales
- Sport: Shooting
Medal record
Commonwealth Games
Gold medal – first place	2002 Manchester	50m Rifle Prone Pairs
Bronze medal – third place	2006 Melbourne	50m Rifle Prone
Bronze medal – third place	2010 Delhi	50m Rifle Prone

Johanne Brekke (born 11 August 1978) is a Welsh sports shooter.

Brekke won a gold medal at the 2002 Commonwealth Games in the Women's Smallbore Rifle Prone Pairs event alongside Ceri Dallimore, a bronze medal at the 2006 Commonwealth Games in the 50m Rifle Prone event and another bronze medal at the 2010 Commonwealth Games in the 50m Rifle Prone Event. She also competed in 1998.

She was a Royal Air Force Air Cadet.
