= Robyn van Nus =

Australian sport shooter (born 1982)

Personal information
- Nationality: Australian
- Born: 10 December 1982 (age 43) Attadale, Western Australia
- Height: 164 cm (5 ft 5 in) (2012)
- Weight: 60 kg (132 lb) (2012)

Sport
- Country: Australia
- Sport: Sport shooting
- Club: Kalamunda Smallbore Rifle Club

Robyn van Nus (born 10 December 1982) is an Australian sport shooter. She competed in two events at the 2008 Summer Olympics and the 2012 Summer Olympics; the Women's Air Rifle, 10 metres event where she finished 44th overall in 2008 and 45th in 2012, and the Women's Small-Bore Rifle, Three Positions, 50 metres event where she finished 40th overall in 2008 and 41st in 2012.

== Personal ==
van Nus was born on 10 December 1982 in Attadale, Western Australia. She attended St Josephs Primary School and St. Norbert College in Western Australia. In 2010, she enrolled at Central Queensland University where she is working on Bachelor of Exercise and Sports Science.

As of 2012, she lives in Sydney.

As of 2012, van Nus was 164 centimetres (5 ft 5 in) tall and weighed 60 kilograms (130 lb), unchanged from 2008. She has chronic fatigue syndrome. Her mother also represented Australia in shooting.

== Shooting ==
van Nus is a sport shooter, specialising in the rifle. She took up the sport around 1998 as a way to deal with chronic fatigue syndrome with her mother serving as her first coach. Petr Kůrka became her coach in 2009. She was a member of the Melbourne International Shooting Club. In 2012, she was a member of the Kalamunda Smallbore Rifle Club. She has a shooting scholarship with the Western Australian Institute of Sport.

van Nus competed in the 2008 Summer Olympics in the Women's Air Rifle, 10 metres event where she finished 44 overall and in the Women's Small-Bore Rifle, Three Positions, 50 metres event where she finished 40th overall. Going into the 2008 Games, her inclusion was challenged by Susannah Smith because van Nus was selected over Smith by having a one-point lead. She competed at the 2010 Commonwealth Shooting Championship, earning a bronze in the 10m air rifle event with a score of 494.2 (394). In the women's 10-metre air rifle pairs, she and partner Aletha Sedgman finished sixth. She had some difficulties with the competition because "her gun and the rest of her equipment was lost in transit to Delhi."

In 2011, van Nus was the number one ranked Australian woman in her discipline. In Brisbane in a July 2011 at national tournament, she broke her own women's air rifle Australian record when she shot 397 out of 400. In October 2011, she participated in the Australia Cup Final in Sydney, but withdrew mid-competition because of a back injury after only shooting nine of her forty shots. She was selected to represent Australia at the 2012 Summer Olympics in shooting. London were her second Games.
