= Jennifer McIntosh =

Scottish Olympic sport shooter and fantasy author

Jennifer McIntosh OLY
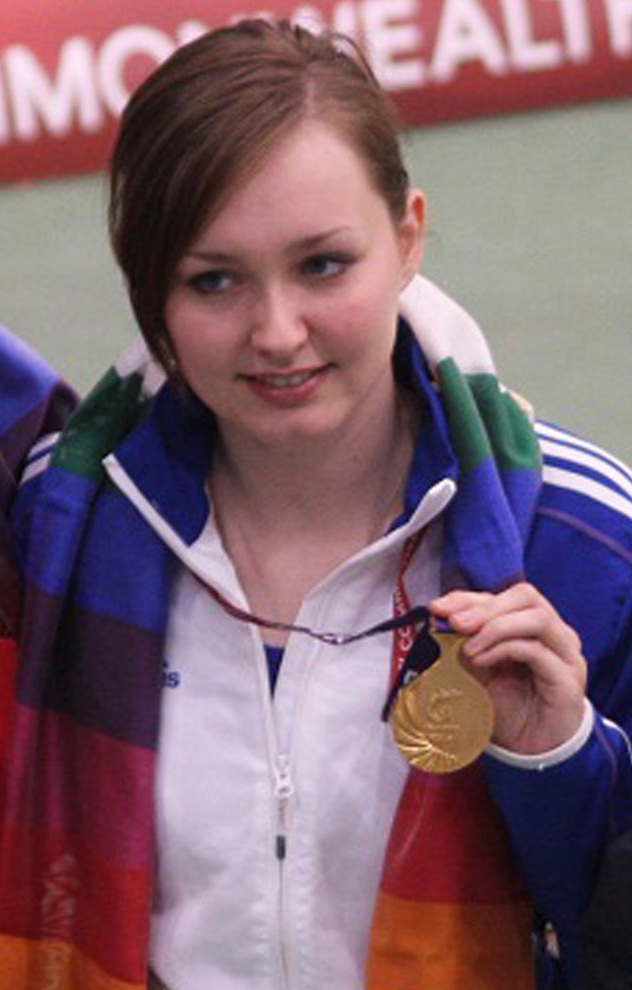
- Jennifer McIntosh in 2010

Personal information
- Born: 17 June 1991 (age 35) Edinburgh, Scotland
- Years active: 2005-2018
- Height: 1.74 m (5 ft 9 in)
- Weight: 75 kg (165 lb)
- Website: Official website

Sport
- Country: United Kingdom
- Sport: Shooting
- Events: 10 metre air rifle; 50 metre rifle three positions; 50 metre rifle prone
- Club: Alloa & District
- Coached by: Donald McIntosh
- Retired: 2018
Medal record
Women's shooting
Representing Great Britain
World Championships
Bronze medal – third place	2018 Changwon	50m Rifle Prone Team
European Championships
Gold medal – first place	2017 Baku	50m Rifle Prone
Gold medal – first place	2017 Baku	50m Rifle 3 Positions Team
Representing Scotland
Commonwealth Games
Gold medal – first place	2010 Delhi	50m Rifle Prone
Gold medal – first place	2010 Delhi	50m Rifle Prone Pairs
Silver medal – second place	2014 Glasgow	50m Rifle 3 Positions Single
Bronze medal – third place	2010 Delhi	50m Rifle 3 Positions Pairs
Bronze medal – third place	2014 Glasgow	50m Rifle Prone
Commonwealth Championships
Gold medal – first place	2010 Delhi	50m Rifle Prone Pairs
Gold medal – first place	2010 Delhi	50m Rifle 3 Positions Pairs
Gold medal – first place	2010 Delhi	50m Rifle 3 Positions Badge
Gold medal – first place	2017 Brisbane	50m Rifle Prone
Bronze medal – third place	2010 Delhi	50m Rifle Prone Badge

Jennifer McIntosh (born 17 June 1991) is a Scottish Olympic sports shooter and fantasy author. McIntosh is the daughter of four-times Commonwealth Games medalist Shirley McIntosh and Donald McIntosh, and the elder sister of British Olympic shooter Seonaid McIntosh.

== Shooting career ==
McIntosh won two golds and a bronze in the 2010 Commonwealth Games, making her the most successful female athlete with Team Scotland. At the 2014 Commonwealth Games in Glasgow she won Silver in the Women's 50 metre rifle three position and Bronze in the 50m rifle prone, making her the most decorated female medal winner in Scottish Commonwealth Games history – a record previously held by her mother and Elenor Gordon.

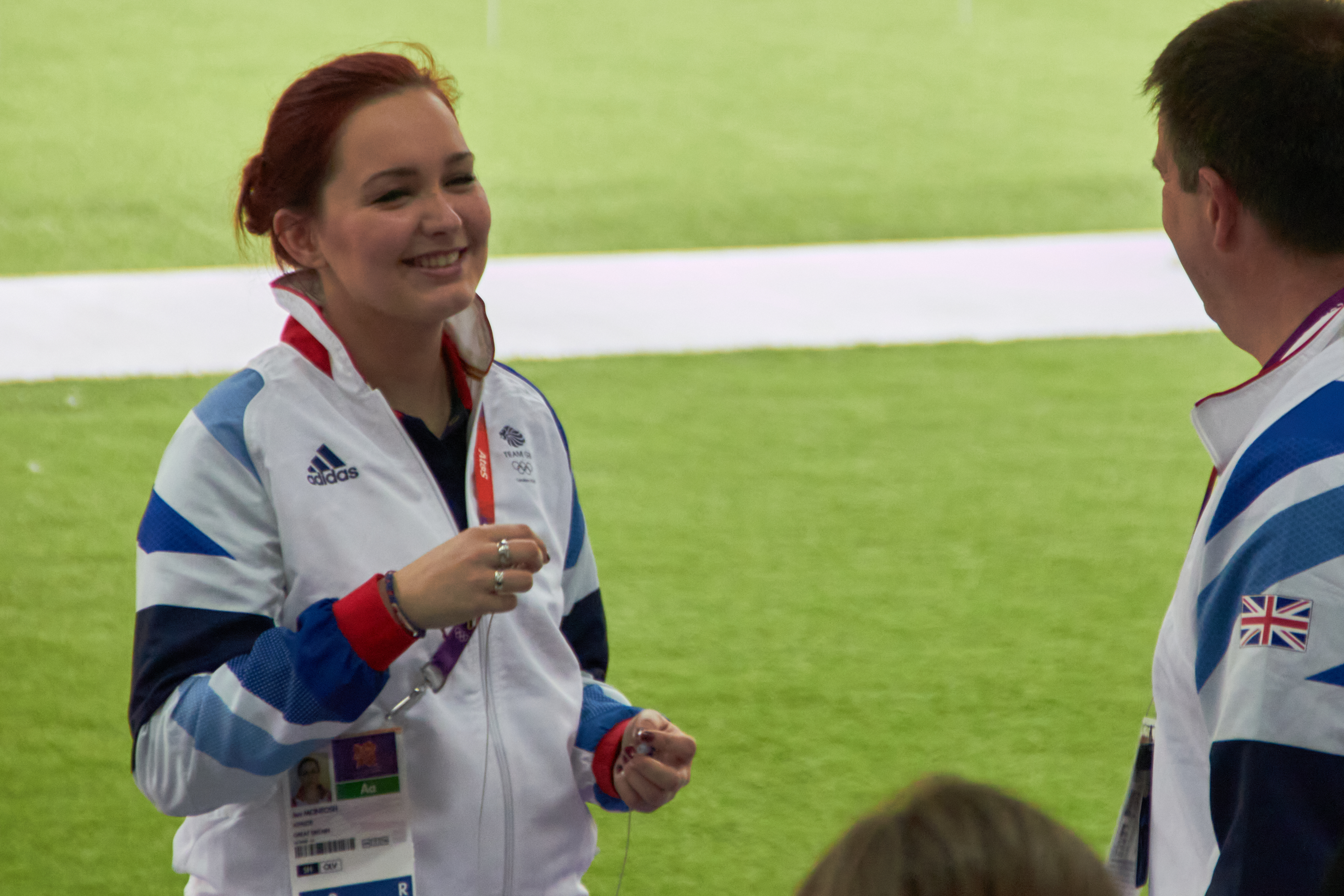
Jennifer McIntosh with father and coach Donald McIntosh before the Women's 3P Rifle event at London 2012 Summer Olympic Games

At the 2012 Summer Olympics, she competed in the 10 metre air rifle and 50 metre three positions events using a Host Nation Quota place.

At the 2015 European Championships in Maribor, she placed fourth in the 50 metre rifle three positions, earning Great Britain a women's rifle quota place to the 2016 Summer Olympics.

McIntosh was awarded the quota place and competed in the 10 metre air rifle and 50 metre three positions events.

In 2017 at the 48th Grand Prix of Liberation in Plzeň, McIntosh took Individual Bronze in the Women's 3x20 rifle with a qualification score of 589, one point off her PB and the British Record. Together with sister Seonaid McIntosh and Katie Gleeson the team won Silver as well as setting a new British Team Record of 1759ex1800. In the Prone 50m Rifle she won another Team Silver whilst setting another British Team Record of 1866.7 with Katie Gleeson and Lina Jones.

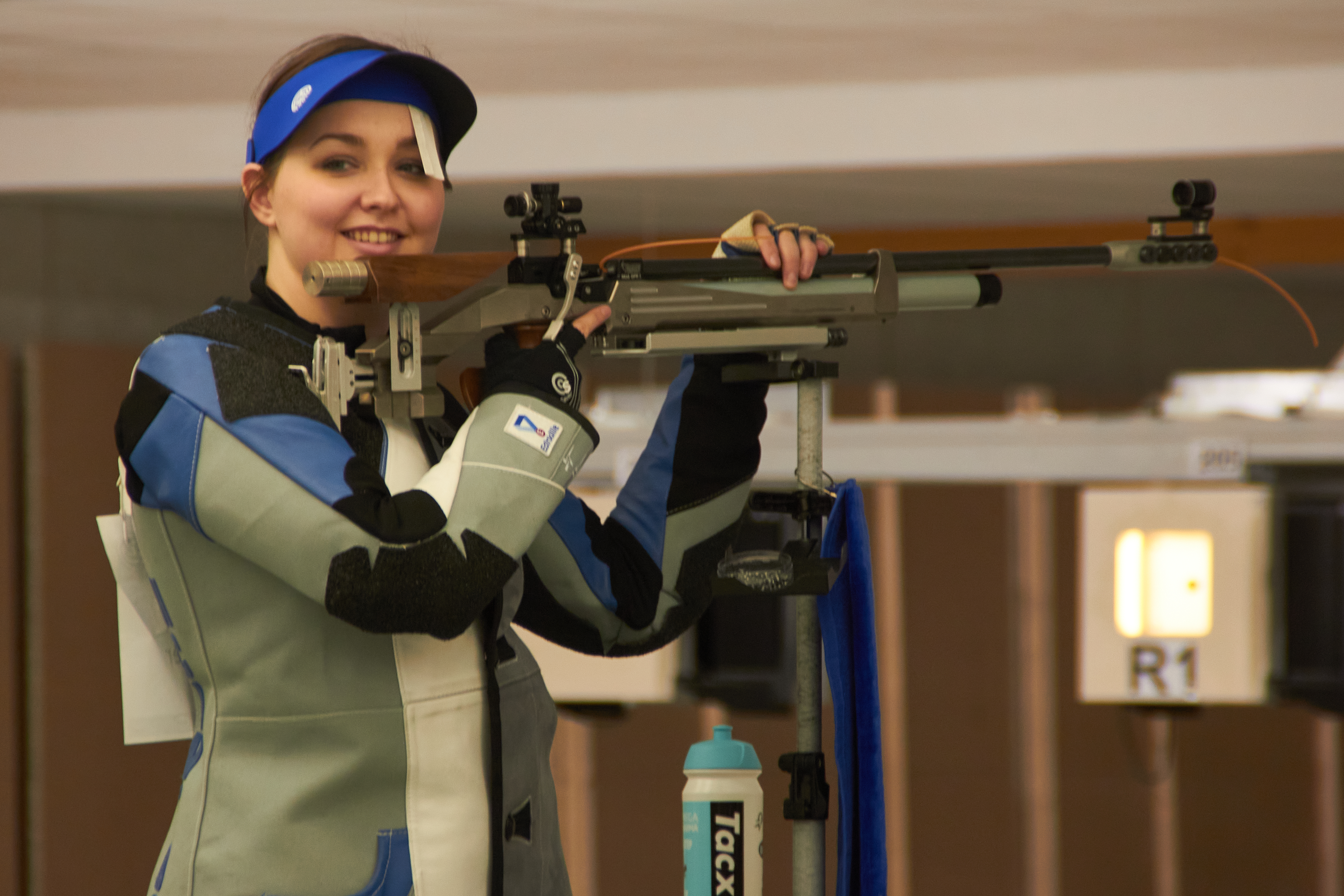
Jennifer McIntosh in the 10m Final at ISCH 2015

Plzeň marked the start of a winning streak for McIntosh and the GB Women's Rifle Team. At the International Shooting Competition of Hannover in May, McIntosh won individual Gold in the 10m Air Rifle, as well as winning Team Golds in all three Women's Rifle Events with Seonaid McIntosh (who won her first Senior Gold medal in the Women's 3x20 50m Rifle) and Katie Gleeson (who took Bronze in the Prone 50m Rifle).

At the 2017 European Shooting Championships, Jennifer went on to take the gold medal in the Women's 50M Prone Rifle becoming European Champion. In the 3x20 she qualified in fourth and placed fifth in the final, whilst younger sister Seonaid won the final, becoming European Champion in that event. Along with Katie Gleeson, the McIntosh sisters won the Three Position Team event.

In November 2017, McIntosh was selected for Scotland's team for the 2018 Commonwealth Games. At the Games she narrowly missed a spot in the 10m Air Rifle Final, qualifying in 9th place.

In July 2018 McIntosh was selected as a member of the GB Team to the 2018 ISSF World Shooting Championships, where she won a bronze medal in the Women's 50m Prone Rifle Team event with teammates Zoe Bruce and Seonaid McIntosh. In the Individual Women's Prone Rifle event, Jen placed 26th. Her sister Seonaid won the event, becoming World Champion.

On 17 September 2018 after returning from the World Championships, Jen announced her retirement from competitive shooting.

== Writing ==
In 2021, McIntosh announced her debut novel, Blood of Ravens, publishing as Jen McIntosh.
