= Michelle Smith (sport shooter) =

Medal record

Representing England

Women's shooting

Commonwealth Games
Silver medal – second place	2010 Delhi	50m rifle prone Pairs

Michelle Smith (born 9 May 1983 in Keighley, West Yorkshire) is a competitive sport shooter from England.

At the 2010 Commonwealth Games she won the silver medal in the Women's 50 metre Prone Pairs event with Sharon Lee.
