= Sharon Lee (sport shooter) =

British sport shooter

Personal information
- Nationality: English
- Born: 6 August 1976 (age 49) Leicester, Leicestershire

Sport
- Sport: Sport shooting
Medal record
Sports shooting
Representing England
Commonwealth Games
Silver medal – second place	2006 Melbourne	50m rifle prone pair

Sharon Elizabeth Lee (born 1976) is a female retired British sport shooter.

== Sport shooting career ==
She represented England in the 50 metres rifle prone at the 1998 Commonwealth Games in Kuala Lumpur, Malaysia. A second Games appearance eight years later in 2006 resulted in winning a silver medal in the same event with Helen Spittles.
