= Commonwealth Shooting Championships =

The Commonwealth Shooting Federation Championships is a shooting championship for Commonwealth countries. Organised by the Commonwealth Shooting Federation, it is typically held as a test event for the Commonwealth Games to validate the preparations for the venue and technical officials.

== Editions ==
- 1995 - New Delhi, India
- 1997 - Langkawi, Malaysia
- 1999 - Auckland, New Zealand (November 16–25)
- 2001 - Bisley, United Kingdom (August 23–31)
- 2005 - Melbourne, Australia
- 2010 - New Delhi, India (February 19–27)
- 2017 (Note: Held in conjunction with the 2017 Oceania Shooting Championships.) - Brisbane, Australia (October 28 – November 8)
- ~~2022 - Chandigarh, India~~

== Shooting in the Commonwealth Games after 2018 ==
=== 2022 Games ===
Shooting is an optional sport at the Commonwealth Games, but had been routinely included since 1974. In January 2018 it was confirmed that shooting would not feature in the 2022 Games programme, citing a lack of facilities near Birmingham. In December 2018, a delegation including the International Shooting Sport Federation and British Shooting visited Birmingham and discussed the addition of shooting with the Birmingham Organising Committee. This proposal was unsuccessful.

In January 2020, the Indian Olympic Association (IOA) submitted a proposal to the CGF to host a combined archery and shooting championships in Chandigarh during January 2022. The CGF Executive Board approved the proposal in February 2020, and also confirmed that the 2022 Commonwealth Shooting and Archery Championships and the 2022 Commonwealth Games will be two separately organised and funded Commonwealth Sport events. In July 2021, the CGF announced that the event had been cancelled due to the COVID-19 pandemic in India.

=== 2026 Games ===
In July 2022, the organising committee for the Victoria Games released their programme, which also did not include shooting. India expressed strong disappointment, raising the matter during the Birmingham Games with visiting organisers from Victoria. Shooting Australia submitted a proposal for shooting when the expression of interest period for additional sports opened.

There is concern that if shooting is missed from two consecutive Games, it may cease to be a regular feature. CSF Championships could continue, but would be detached from any particular host as they would no longer represent a test event for the Games. This has also raised concerns over funding for both the Championships and participating teams as this has traditionally been drawn from Games budgets as part of preparations.

== European Division ==
The ten Commonwealth nations in Europe have operated a CSF(ED) Championship since 1974, typically in any year where there is not a Commonwealth Games or full CSF Championship. This serves to provide development shooters with experience of matches run to international standards.

Due to restrictive firearms laws in Great Britain, cartridge pistol events are generally run in another nation when England, Scotland or Wales host the Championship.
