= England at the 2010 Commonwealth Games (S–Z) =

- CG code: ENG
- CGA: Commonwealth Games England
- Website: weareengland.org

in Delhi, India
- Competitors: 364 in 17 sports
- Flag bearers: Opening: Nathan Robertson; Closing: Nicky Hunt
- Medals Ranked 3rd: Gold 37 Silver 60 Bronze 45 Total 142

Commonwealth Games appearances (overview)
- 1930; 1934; 1938; 1950; 1954; 1958; 1962; 1966; 1970; 1974; 1978; 1982; 1986; 1990; 1994; 1998; 2002; 2006; 2010; 2014; 2018; 2022; 2026; 2030

England was represented at the 2010 Commonwealth Games by Commonwealth Games England. The country's abbreviation was ENG, they used the Cross of St George as its flag and "Jerusalem" as its victory anthem. It had previously used "Land of Hope and Glory" as its anthem at the Commonwealth Games, but decided to change following an "internet poll".

England's delegation is notable for including two Paralympic champions, who qualified to compete in Delhi against fully able-bodied athletes: Danielle Brown, who won a gold medal in archery at the 2008 Summer Paralympics, and Sarah Storey, who won two gold medals in cycling in 2008. They are the first English athletes with disabilities ever to compete in able-bodied events at the Commonwealth Games.

== England 2010 ==
Key
Qualifiers / Medal Winners
Top 8 Finish (Non Medal Winners)
Non-Qualifiers / Non Top 8 Finish

== Shooting ==
Team England consists of 22 shooters over 34 events

=== Clay Target ===
Men

Event	Shooter(s)	Qualifying		Final	
Event	Shooter(s)	Points	Rank	Points	Rank
Trap Singles	Aaron Heading	123 pts	2 Q	147 pts	Gold
Trap Singles	David Kirk	116 pts	18	DNQ	18
Trap Pairs	Aaron Heading & David Kirk			193 pts	Bronze
Double Trap Singles	Stevan Walton	143 pts	1 Q	190 pts	Gold
Double Trap Singles	Steven Scott	137 pts	6 Q	181 pts	6
Double Trap Pairs	Steven Scott & Stevan Walton			189 pts	Gold
Skeet Singles	Richard Brickell	121 pts	2 Q	144 pts	Gold
Skeet Singles	Clive Bramley	121 pts	3 Q	143 pts	5
Skeet Pairs	Clive Bramley & Richard Brickell			191 pts	Bronze

Women

Event	Shooter(s)	Qualifying		Final	
Event	Shooter(s)	Points	Rank	Points	Rank
Trap Singles	Anita North	71 pts	1 Q	93 pts	Gold
Trap Singles	Abbey Burton	68 pts	8	DNQ	8
Trap Pairs	Abbey Burton & Anita North			91 pts	Silver

=== Pistol ===
Men

Event	Shooter(s)	Qualifying		Final	
Event	Shooter(s)	Points	Rank	Points	Rank
10m Air Pistol Singles	Mick Gault	574 pts	5	671.6 pts	6
10m Air Pistol Singles	Nick Baxter	569 pts	9	DNQ	9
10m Air Pistol Pairs	Nick Baxter & Mick Gault			1,143 pts	Silver
25m Centre Fire Singles	Mick Gault			574 pts	4
25m Centre Fire Singles	Iqbal Ubhi			555 pts	21
25m Centre Fire Pairs	Mick Gault			1,124 pts	8
25m Standard Singles	Mick Gault			551 pts	7
25m Standard Singles	Iqbal Ubhi			540 pts	16
25m Standard Pairs	Mick Gault & Iqbal Ubhi			1,098 pts	Bronze
50m Pistol Singles	Nick Baxter	543 pts	5 Q	635.7 pts	5
50m Pistol Singles	Mick Gault	542 pts	7 Q	632.3 pts	7
50m Pistol Pairs	Nick Baxter & Mick Gault			1,073 pts	5

Women

Event	Shooter(s)	Qualifying		Final	
Event	Shooter(s)	Points	Rank	Points	Rank
10m Air Pistol Singles	Gorgs Geikie	370 pts	12	DNQ	12
10m Air Pistol Singles	Julia Lydall	374 pts	8	471.6 pts	7
10m Air Pistol Pairs	Gorgs Geikie & Julia Lydall			754 pts	5
25m Pistol Singles	Julia Lydall	568 pts	7 Q	765.5 pts	7
25m Pistol Singles	Gorgs Geikie	562 pts	9	DNQ	9
25m Pistol Pairs	Gorgs Geikie & Julia Lydall			1,122 pts	Bronze

=== Small Bore ===
Men

Event	Shooter(s)	Qualifying		Final	
Event	Shooter(s)	Points	Rank	Points	Rank
10m Air Rifle Singles	James Huckle	591 pts	4 Q	693.5 pts	Bronze
10m Air Rifle Singles	Kenny Parr	593 pts	3 Q	693.0 pts	4
10m Air Rifle Pairs	James Huckle & Kenny Parr			1,174 pts	Silver
50m Rifle 3 Pos Singles	James Huckle	1,157 pts	3 Q	1,254.9 pts	Bronze
50m Rifle 3 Pos Singles	Kenny Parr	1,136 pts	8 Q	1,229.8 pts	7
50m Rifle 3 Pos Pairs	James Huckle & Kenny Parr			2,308 pts	Silver
50m Rifle Prone Singles	Mike Babb	592 pts	4	693.9 pts	4
50m Rifle Prone Singles	Richard Wilson	DSQ	-	DSQ	-
50m Rifle Prone Pairs	Mike Babb & Richard Wilson			1,178 pts	Silver

Women

Event	Shooter(s)	Qualifying		Final	
Event	Shooter(s)	Points	Rank	Points	Rank
10m Air Rifle Singles	Sheree Cox	389 pts	11	DNQ	11
10m Air Rifle Singles	Sharon Lee	389 pts	12	DNQ	12
10m Air Rifle Pairs	Sheree Cox & Sharon Lee			779 pts	7
50m Rifle 3 Pos Singles	Sharon Lee	556 pts	16	DNQ	16
50m Rifle 3 Pos Singles	Michelle Smith	562 pts	14	DNQ	14
50m Rifle 3 Pos Pairs	Sharon Lee & Michelle Smith			1,118 pts	7
50m Rifle Prone Singles	Michelle Smith			591 pts	4
50m Rifle Prone Singles	Sharon Lee			586 pts	8
50m Rifle Prone Pairs	Sharon Lee & Michelle Smith			1,169 pts	Silver

=== Full Bore ===
Event	Shooter(s)	Stage 1 300 yds	Stage 1 500 yds	Stage 1 600 yds	Stage 2 300 yds	Stage 2 500 yds	Stage 2 600 yds	Stage 3 900 yds	Stage 3 1000 yds	Total Points	Rank
Event	Shooter(s)	Points	Points	Points	Points	Points	Points	Points	Points	Total Points	Rank
Full Bore Singles	Parag Patel	34-3v	35-6v	35-3v	49-6v	50-7v	47-6v	73-5v	73-6v	396-42v	Gold
Full Bore Singles	Jon Underwood	35-5v	32-2v	35-7v	48-4v	50-7v	48-7v	69-6v	57-1v	374-39v	26
Full Bore Pairs	Parag Patel & Jon Underwood				98-7v	99-10v	99-10v	146-13v	142-8v	584-48v	Bronze

== Squash ==
Team England consists of 10 squash players over 5 events. The competition draw was announced on 22 September 2010. (Seeds are denoted in brackets after players' names)

Men's Singles

Player(s)	Round of 64	Round of 32	Round of 16	Quarter Final	Semi Final	Final	Rank
Player(s)	Opposition Result	Opposition Result	Opposition Result	Opposition Result	Opposition Result	Opposition Result	Rank
Nick Matthew (1)	BYE	(Malaysia) Adnan (MAS); W 11–6 13–11 6–11; 11–3	(Pakistan) Khan (PAK); W 10–12 11–3 11–5; 11–5	(Australia) Pilley (AUS) (7); W 11–7 11–5 11–6	(England) Barker (ENG) (3); W 11–9 11–2 11–9	(England) Willstrop (ENG) (2); W 11–6 11–7 11–7	Gold
James Willstrop (2)	BYE	(Malaysia) Yuen (MAS); W 11–7 11–4 11–4	(Canada) Delierre (CAN); W 11–7 11–4 10–12; 11–2	(Australia) Palmer (AUS) (5); W 9–11 8–11 11–5; 11–8 11–5	(Malaysia) Iskandar (MAS) (6); W 11–4 11–7 11–5	(England) Matthew (ENG) (1); L 6–11 7–11 7–11	Silver
Peter Barker (3)	(Zambia) Ndhlovu (ZAM); W 11–2 11–1 11–1	(Scotland) Clyne (SCO); W 11–4 11–2 11–3	(India) Ghosal (IND) (11); W11–9 11–9 11–13; 11–5	(Australia) Boswell (AUS) (8); W 10–12 11–9 11–3; 11–3	(England) Matthew (ENG) (1); L 9–11 2–11 9–11	Bronze Final: (Malaysia) Iskandar (MAS) (6); W 11–5 11–4 11–2	Bronze
Daryl Selby (4)	(Papua New Guinea) Rucklinger (PNG); W 11–2 11–1 11–2	(Pakistan) Khan (PAK); W 11–5 11–4 11–3	(Guernsey) Simpson (GGY); W 11–9 11–5 11–5	(Malaysia) Iskandar (MAS) (6); L 6–11 11–7 11–13; 11–13	-	-	-

Women's Singles

Player(s)	Round of 64	Round of 32	Round of 16	Quarter Final	Semi Final	Final	Rank
Player(s)	Opposition Result	Opposition Result	Opposition Result	Opposition Result	Opposition Result	Opposition Result	Rank
Jenny Duncalf (2)	BYE	(Guernsey) Curgenven (GGY); W 11–4 11–3 11–1	(England) Kippax (ENG) (10); W 4–11 11–3 11–6; 11–2	(New Zealand) Hawkes (NZL) (7); W 11–8 11–4 12–10	(England) Waters (ENG) (3); W 6–11 12–10 11–9; 11–4	(Malaysia) David (MAS) (1); L 3–11 5–11 7–11	Silver
Alison Waters (3)	BYE	(Canada) Cornett (CAN); W 11–2 11–4 11–5	(Canada) Edmison (CAN); W 11–3 11–3 11–3	(New Zealand) King (NZL) (12); W 12–10 9–11 11–5; 10–12 11–2	(England) Duncalf (ENG) (2); L 11–6 10–12 9–11; 4–11	Bronze Final: (Australia) Brown (AUS) (6); L W/O	4
Laura Massaro (5)	BYE	(Scotland) Aitken (SCO); W 11–4 11–2 11–5	(Canada) Miller (CAN) (16); W 11–7 11–4 11–3	(Malaysia) David (MAS) (1); L 5–11 3–11 7–11	-	-	-
Sarah Kippax (10)	BYE	(India) Alankamony (IND); W 11–7 11–4 11–3	(England) Duncalf (ENG) (2); L 11–4 3–11 6–11; 2–11	-	Classic Plate; Semi Final: (Scotland) Gillen-Buchert (SCO); W W/O	Classic Plate Final: (Jersey) Cowie (JEY); L W/O	-

Men's Doubles

Player(s)	Pool Match 1	Pool Match 2	Round of 16	Quarter Final	Semi Final	Final	Rank
Player(s)	Opposition Result	Opposition Result	Opposition Result	Opposition Result	Opposition Result	Opposition Result	Rank
Adrian Grant & Nick Matthew (1)	(Cayman Islands) Blair & Frazer (CAY); W 11–1 11–4	(Zambia) Chifunda & Chilufya (ZAM); W 11–0 11–0	(Pakistan) Butt & Khan (PAK); W 11–6 11–8	(Malaysia) Adnan & Iskandar (MAS); W 11–5 11–10	(Australia) Cuskelly & Pilley (AUS); W 11–10 11–9	(Australia) Boswell & Palmer (AUS); W 11–9 6–11 11–5	Gold
Peter Barker & Daryl Selby (3)	(Norfolk Island) Christian-Bailey & Rundell (NFK); W 11–4 11–1	(Malta) Fiteni & Hindle (MLT) (14); W 11–7 11–6	(Canada) Clarke & Delierre (CAN)); W 11–4 11–2	(Scotland) Clyne & Leitch (SCO); L 7–11 7–11	-	-	-

Women's Doubles

Player(s)	Pool Match 1	Pool Match 2	Pool Match 3	Quarter Final	Semi Final	Final	Rank
Player(s)	Opposition Result	Opposition Result	Opposition Result	Opposition Result	Opposition Result	Opposition Result	Rank
Jenny Duncalf & Laura Massaro (4)	(Kenya) Madhani & Nimji (KEN); W 11–0 11–3	(Malaysia) Arnold & Wern Wee (MAS); W 11–10 11–4	(India) Alankamony & Misra (IND); W 11–6 11–1	(New Zealand) Leevey & Lindsay (NZL); W 11–4 11–9	(Australia) Brown & Urquhart (AUS); W 6–11 11–5 11–4	(New Zealand) Hawkes & King (NZL); L 9–11 10–11	Silver
Tania Bailey & Sarah Kippax (6)	(Guyana) Fernandes & Khalil (GUY); W 11–6 11–2	(Northern Ireland) Barr & Perry (NIR); W 11–7 11–3	(Australia) Camilleri & Pittock (AUS) (3); L 4–11 9–11	(New Zealand) Hawkes & King (NZL); L 4–11 11–9 4–11	-	-	-

Mixed Doubles

Player(s)	Pool Match 1	Pool Match 2	Pool Match 3	Round of 16	Quarter Final	Semi Final	Final	Rank
Player(s)	Opposition Result	Opposition Result	Opposition Result	Opposition Result	Opposition Result	Opposition Result	Opposition Result	Rank
Jenny Duncalf & James Willstrop (2)	(Jersey) Cowie & Hopkins (JEY); W 11–2 11–2	(New Zealand) King & Knight (NZL) (11); L 9–11 5–11	(Kenya) Madhani & Bains (KEN); W 11–3 11–4	(Guernsey) Curgenven & Birch (GGY); W 11–4 11–2	(Australia) Brown & Pilley (AUS); L 7–11 11–7 8–11	-	-	-
Sarah Kippax & Adrian Grant (6)	(Guernsey) Curgenven & Birch (GGY); W 11–5 11–5	(Sri Lanka) Guruge & Samarasinghe (SRI); W 11–6 11–5	-	(Malaysia) David & Ong (MAS); L 7–11 3–11	-	-	-	-

== Table Tennis ==
Team England consists of 11 table tennis players over 8 events.

Men's Singles

Player(s)	Qualifying	Round of 64	Round of 32	Round of 16	Quarter Final	Semi Final	Final	Rank
Player(s)	Opposition Results	Opposition Result	Opposition Result	Opposition Result	Opposition Result	Opposition Result	Opposition Result	Rank
Paul Drinkhall (5)	BYE	BYE	(Nigeria) Jegede (NGR); W 11–8 11–6 11–6; 11–4	(India) Ravichandran (IND); W 11–9 9–11 11–4; 4–11 11–3 8–11; 11–6	(Singapore) Yang (SIN); L 6–11 10–12 11–8; 11–8 9–11 5–11	-	-	-
Andrew Baggaley (9)	BYE	BYE	(Nigeria) Ajetunmobi (NGR); W 5–11 11–8 11–4; 14–12 11–8	(Singapore) Gao (SIN); L 7–11 5–11 6–11; 10–12	-	-	-	-
Daniel Reed	(Saint Vincent and the Grenadines) Hunte (VIN); W 11–5 11–6 11–1; 11–8	(Sri Lanka) M-Gedara (SRI); W 11–3 11–5 11–7; 11–9	(Nigeria) Aruna (NGR); W 11–8 5–11 8–11; 11–4 11–8 11–8	(Singapore) Cai (SIN); L 7–11 6–11 7–11; 8–11	-	-	-	-
Daniel Reed	(Ghana) Ofori Addo (GHA); W 11–2 11–7 11–9; 11–5	(Sri Lanka) M-Gedara (SRI); W 11–3 11–5 11–7; 11–9	(Nigeria) Aruna (NGR); W 11–8 5–11 8–11; 11–4 11–8 11–8	(Singapore) Cai (SIN); L 7–11 6–11 7–11; 8–11	-	-	-	-
Darius Knight	(Seychelles) Nibourette (SEY); W 11–8 11–3 11–5; 11–5	(Guyana) Lewis (GUY); W 11–6 11–8 13–11; 11–7	(Nigeria) Merotohun (NGR); W 12–10 7–11 11–8; 11–4 7–11 11–8	(Singapore) Ma (SIN); L 7–11 8–11 9–11; 7–11	-	-	-	-
Darius Knight	(Ghana) Abrefa (GHA); W 11–9 11–3 9–11; 11–7 11–3	(Guyana) Lewis (GUY); W 11–6 11–8 13–11; 11–7	(Nigeria) Merotohun (NGR); W 12–10 7–11 11–8; 11–4 7–11 11–8	(Singapore) Ma (SIN); L 7–11 8–11 9–11; 7–11	-	-	-	-
Liam Pitchford	(Sierra Leone) Barnabas (SLE); W 11–2 11–0 11–1; 11–3	(Sri Lanka) P-Don Silva (SRI); W 10–12 11–7 12–10; 11–4 11–4	(Singapore) Yang (SIN); L 6–11 4–11 6–11; 6–11	-	-	-	-	-
Liam Pitchford	(Kenya) Daim (KEN); W 11–7 11–4 11–3; 14–12	(Sri Lanka) P-Don Silva (SRI); W 10–12 11–7 12–10; 11–4 11–4	(Singapore) Yang (SIN); L 6–11 4–11 6–11; 6–11	-	-	-	-	-

Women's Singles

Player(s)	Qualifying 1	Qualifying 2	Round of 32	Round of 16	Quarter Final	Semi Final	Final	Rank
Player(s)	Opposition Results	Opposition Result	Opposition Result	Opposition Result	Opposition Result	Opposition Result	Opposition Result	Rank
Kelly Sibley (7)	BYE	BYE	(Nigeria) Edem (NGR); W 11–6 2–11 11–8; 11–3 4–11 13–11	(Australia) Tan (AUS); L 4–11 6–11 8–11; 11–7 5–11	-	-	-	-
Joanna Parker (10)	BYE	BYE	(New Zealand) Hung (NZL); W 11–2 11–7 11–6; 8–11 11–4	(Singapore) Li (SIN); L 7–11 12–10 7–11; 8–11 1–11	-	-	-	-
Hannah Hicks	(Tanzania) Kikwa (TAN); W W/O	(Sri Lanka) Gonapinuwala (SRI); W 11–1 11–2 11–9 16–14	(India) Patkar (IND); L 8–11 3–11 4–11; 2–11	-	-	-	-	-
Karina Lefevre	(Kenya) Maina (KEN); W 11–6 11–5 11–3 11–4	(Wales) Carey (WAL); L 4–11 7–11 11–6 6–11; 6–11	-	-	-	-	-	-

EAD Para-Sports – Women's Wheelchair Singles

Player(s)	Qualifying	Qualifying	Qualifying	Qualifying	Qualifying	Semi Final	Final	Rank
Player(s)	Opposition Result	Opposition Result	Opposition Result	Opposition Result	Opposition Result	Opposition Result	Opposition Result	Rank
Leanne Stephen	(Nigeria) Obiora; L 4–11 7–11 6–11	(South Africa) Moll; W 7–11 11–9 8–11; 11–5 11–8	(Kenya) Kamande; W 11–6 11–2 11–3	(India) Patel; L 8–11 6–11 11–8; 3–11	(India) Rathod; W 11–6 11–8 11–5	-	-	-
Hannah Coulthurst	(India) Patel; L 10–12 4–11 8–11	(Nigeria) Konwea; L 6–11 3–11 7–11	(Kenya) Chesang; W 11–3 11–1 11–2	(Nigeria) Oputa; L 4–11 6–11 2–11	(Australia) Morrow; L 5–11 5–11 3–11	-	-	-

Men's Doubles

Player(s)	Round of 64	Round of 32	Round of 16	Quarter Final	Semi Final	Final	Rank
Player(s)	Opposition Result	Opposition Result	Opposition Result	Opposition Result	Opposition Result	Opposition Result	Rank
Andrew Baggaley & Liam Pitchford	BYE	(Tanzania) Liundi & Suleiman (TAN); W 11–1 11–6 11–3	(Malaysia) Ibrahim & Chai (MAS); W 11–8 8–11 9–11; 11–4 11–5	(Singapore) Cai & Ma (SIN); W 6–11 11–7 11–9; 11–4	(India) Achanta & Saha (IND); L 13–11 7–11 11–7; 10–12 6–11	Bronze Final (Australia) Henzell & Frank (AUS); W 11–7 8–11 12–10; 10–12 11–6	Bronze
Paul Drinkhall & Darius Knight	BYE	(Nigeria) Merotohun & Jegede (NGR); L 11–9 11–3 7–11; 12–14 11–13	-	-	-	-	-

Women's Doubles

Player(s)	Round of 32	Round of 16	Quarter Final	Semi Final	Final	Rank
Player(s)	Opposition Result	Opposition Result	Opposition Result	Opposition Result	Opposition Result	Rank
Joanna Parker & Kelly Sibley	(Vanuatu) Lulu & Santhy (VAN); W W/O	(New Zealand) Sun & Hung (NZL); L 7–11 9–11 6–11	-	-	-	-
Hannah Hicks & Karina Lefevre	(Uganda) Lukaaya & Kibone (UGA); W W/O	(Malaysia) Beh & Ng (MAS); L 11–9 7–11 9–11; 5–11	-	-	-	-

Mixed Doubles

Player(s)	Round of 64	Round of 32	Round of 16	Quarter Final	Semi Final	Final	Rank
Player(s)	Opposition Result	Opposition Result	Opposition Result	Opposition Result	Opposition Result	Opposition Result	Rank
Paul Drinkhall & Joanna Parker	(Dominica) Jerome & Dover (DMA); W 11–3 11–1 11–5	(Mauritius) Taucoory & Goodur (MRI); W 12–10 11–5 11–8	(Wales) Jenkins & Owen (WAL); W 11–4 11–7 11–4	(Singapore) Cai & Li (SIN); W 11–9 8–11 4–11; 11–3 11–7	(Singapore) Yang & Wang (SIN); L 4–11 9–11 6–11	Bronze Final (Australia) Henzell & Miao (AUS); W 11–5 5–11 13–11; 11–6	Bronze
Darius Knight & Kelly Sibley	(Tanzania) Liundi & Mwaisyula (TAN); W 11–3 11–3 11–6	(Australia) Han & Tan (AUS); W 7–11 11–6 11–6; 11–8	(Singapore) Gao & Feng (SIN); L 11–9 7–11 7–11; 6–11	-	-	-	-
Daniel Reed & Karina Lefevre	(Malaysia) Tan & Fan (MAS); W 11–8 12–10 11–7	(Nigeria) Merotohun & Edem (NGR); L 11–7 4–11 7–11; 10–12	-	-	-	-	-
Liam Pitchford & Hannah Hicks	(Vanuatu) Shing & Lulu (VAN); W 11–6 11–6 4–11; 11–9	(Australia) Gerada & Lay (AUS); L 4–11 6–11 8–11	-	-	-	-	-

Men's Team

Andrew Baggaley, Paul Drinkhall, Darius Knight, Liam Pitchford, Daniel Reed

	Pool Game 1	Pool Game 2	Pool Game 3	Quarter Final	Semi Final	Final	Rank
	Opposition Result	Opposition Result	Opposition Result	Opposition Result	Opposition Result	Opposition Result	Rank
Opponents	Mauritius	Wales	Tanzania	Malaysia	India	Singapore	Silver
Match 1	(England) Drinkhall v (Mauritius) Chan Yook Fo; W 11–9 11–2 11–4	(England) Drinkhall v (Wales) Jenkins; W 11–5 8–11 11–8; 11–7	(England) Reed v (Tanzania) Liundi; W 11–2 11–5 11–1	(England) Drinkhall v (Malaysia) Kho; W 11–6 5–11 11–3; 11–7	(England) Pitchford v (India) Achanta; L 8–11 4–11 8–11	(England) Pitchford v (Singapore) Gao; W 4–11 6–11 11–8; 11–9 13–11	Silver
Match 2	(England) Pitchford v (Mauritius) Taucoory; W 11–4 9–11 11–6; 11–5	(England) Pitchford v (Wales) Thomas; W 11–5 11–5 12–10	(England) Baggaley v (Tanzania) Swenhele; W 11–3 11–3 11–5	(England) Pitchford v (Malaysia) Ibrahim; W 11–8 9–11 9–11; 11–8 13–11	(England) Drinkhall v (India) Arputharaj; W 11–8 4–11 11–5; 7–11 12–10	(England) Drinkhall v (Singapore) Yang; L 11–9 7–11 9–11; 1–11	Silver
Match 3	(England) Knight v (Mauritius) Li Kam Wa; W 11–9 11–7 11–4	(England) Reed v (Wales) Jenkins; W 11–8 11–5 8–11; 9–11 11–8	(England) Knight v (Tanzania) Mtalaso; W 11–2 11–2 11–4	(England) Baggaley v (Malaysia) Chai; W 11–9 11–7 11–3	(England) Baggaley v (India) Saha; W 11–4 12–10 11–8	(England) Baggaley v (Singapore) Ma; L 11–8 8–11 8–11; 6–11	Silver
Match 4	-	-	-	-	(England) Drinkhall v (India) Achanta; W 11–9 11–5 10–12; 11–4	(England) Drinkhall v (Singapore) Gao; L 11–9 9–11 1–11; 7–11	Silver
Match 5	-	-	-	-	-	-	Silver
Result	W 3–0	W 3–0	W 3–0	W 3–0	W 3–1	L 1–3	Silver

Women's Team

Hannah Hicks, Karina Lefevre, Joanna Parker, Kelly Sibley

	Pool Game 1	Pool Game 2	Pool Game 3	Quarter Final	Semi Final	Final	Rank
	Opposition Result	Opposition Result	Opposition Result	Opposition Result	Opposition Result	Opposition Result	Rank
Opponents	Northern Ireland	Nigeria	Maldives	Canada	India	Bronze Final: Malaysia	4
Match 1	(England) Parker v (Northern Ireland) Liu; L 5–11 4–11 8–11	(England) Sibley v (Nigeria) Effiom; W 11–7 10–12 11–8; 11–6	(England) Hicks v (Maldives) Ibrahim; W 11–3 11–2 11–4	(England) Sibley v (Canada) Zhang; L 9–11 2–11 3–11	(England) Sibley v (India) Kumaresan; L 11–7 4–11 8–11 6–11	(England) Sibley v (Malaysia) Beh; L 11–8 2–11 13–11; 11–13 9–11	4
Match 2	(England) Sibley v (Northern Ireland) Mogey; W 11–4 11–3 7–11; 11–1	(England) Parker v (Nigeria) Edem; W 11–4 2–11 12–10; 7–11 11–3	(England) Sibley v (Maldives) Mohamed; W 11–2 11–3 11–3	(England) Parker v (Canada) Yuen; W 11–5 11–2 11–9	(England) Parker v (India) Das; L 3–11 8–11 7–11	(England) Parker v (Malaysia) Ng; L 11–7 6–11 7–11; 12–10 9–11	4
Match 3	(England) Hicks v (Northern Ireland) Nelson; W 11–4 11–5 11–3	(England) Hicks v (Nigeria) Atinuke; W 11–9 11–4 12–10	(England) Lefevre v (Maldives) Nimal; W 11–5 11–7 11–5	(England) Hicks v (Canada) Lee; W 11–2 7–11 12–10; 11–7	(England) Hicks v (India) Ghatak; L 8–11 3–11 6–11	(England) Hicks v (Malaysia) Fan; W 12–10 13–11 12–10	4
Match 4	(England) Sibley v (Northern Ireland) Liu; L 7–11 14–12 9–11; 11–4 7–11	-	-	(England) Parker v (Canada) Zhang; W 11–6 11–7 11–5	-	(England) Parker v (Malaysia) Beh; W 11–7 11–4 12–10	4
Match 5	(England) Parker v (Northern Ireland) Mogey; W 11–3 11–6 11–2	-	-	-	-	(England) Sibley v (Malaysia) Ng; L 7–11 11–9 9–11; 11–7 8–11	4
Result	W 3–2	W 3–0	W 3–0	W 3–1	L 0–3	L 2–3	4

== Tennis ==
Team England consisted of 7 players over 5 events. On 28 September 2010, Richard Bloomfield announced his withdrawal from the games due to a back injury. He was replaced by Josh Goodall. The competition draws were announced on 1 October 2010. (Seeds are denoted in brackets after players' names)

Medal Tally

Gold	Silver	Bronze	TOTAL
0	1	1	2

Men's Singles

Player	Round of 32	Round of 16	Quarter Final	Semi Final	Final	Rank
Player	Opposition Result	Opposition Result	Opposition Result	Opposition Result	Opposition Result	Rank
James Ward (4)	(Solomon Islands) Leong (SOL); W 6–1 6–1	(Scotland) Murray (SCO); W 7–5 6–0	(Australia) Jones (AUS) (5); L 3–6 2–6	-	-	=5
Josh Goodall (7)	(Saint Lucia) Richelieu (LCA); W 6–2 6–2	(The Bahamas) Rolle (BAH); W 6–4 6–3	(Australia) Ebden (AUS) (3); L 7–6 1–6 6–7	-	-	=5
Ross Hutchins	(Pakistan) Khan (PAK); W 6–2 7–6	(Wales) Milton (WAL) (8); L 4–6 2–6	-	-	-	=9

Women's Singles

Player	Round of 32	Round of 16	Quarter Final	Semi Final	Final	Rank
Player	Opposition Result	Opposition Result	Opposition Result	Opposition Result	Opposition Result	Rank
Katie O'Brien (3)	BYE	(India) Chakravarthi (IND); L 6–1 6–7 5–7	-	-	-	=9
Anna Smith (7)	(Sri Lanka) Muttiah (SRI); W 6–0 6–0	(Mauritius) Ghosh (MRI); W 6–4 6–1	(Australia) Peers (AUS) (4); L 3–6 3–6	-	-	=5

Men's Doubles

Players	Round of 16	Quarter Final	Semi Final	Final	Rank
Players	Opposition Result	Opposition Result	Opposition Result	Opposition Result	Rank
Ken Skupski & Ross Hutchins (3)	(Sri Lanka) Godamanna & Rajapakse (SRI); W 6–2 6–1	(Barbados) King & Lewis (BAR); W 6–3 7–5	(India) Bopanna & Devvarman (IND) (2); W 3–6 6–3 6–4	(Australia) Hanley & Luczak (AUS) (4); L 4–6 6–3 3–6	Silver
James Ward & Josh Goodall	(Kenya) Mwangi & Okoth (KEN); W 6–2 6–2	(India) Bhupathi & Paes (IND) (1); L 2–6 7–6 6–7	-	-	=5

Women's Doubles

Players	Round of 16	Quarter Final	Semi Final	Final	Rank
Players	Opposition Result	Opposition Result	Opposition Result	Opposition Result	Rank
Sarah Borwell & Anna Smith (2)	BYE	(India) Sanjeev & Venkatesha (IND); L 5–7 4–6	-	-	=5

Mixed Doubles

Players	Round of 16	Quarter Final	Semi Final	Final	Rank
Players	Opposition Result	Opposition Result	Opposition Result	Opposition Result	Rank
Sarah Borwell & Ken Skupski (3)	(New Zealand) Erakovic & Statham (NZL); W 6–2 7–6	(Guernsey) Watson & Ogier (GGY); W 6–0 6–1	(Australia) Rodionova & Hanley (AUS); L 4–6 6–3 6–7	Bronze Final: (England) Smith & Hutchins (ENG) (4); W 4–6 6–3 6–2	Bronze
Anna Smith & Ross Hutchins (4)	(Bermuda) Lambert & Thomas (BER); W 6–1 6–2	(Mauritius) Ghosh & Patel (MRI); W 6–2 6–2	(Scotland) Rae & Fleming (SCO); L 3–6 6–1 5–7	Bronze Final: (England) Borwell & Skupski (ENG) (3); L 6–4 3–6 2–6	4

== Weightlifting ==
Team England consisted of 12 athletes over 10 events.

Medal Tally

Gold	Silver	Bronze	TOTAL
0	0	1	1

Men

Event	Athlete	Weights Lifted		Total Lifted	Rank
Event	Athlete	Snatch	Clean & Jerk	Total Lifted	Rank
62 kg	Christopher Freebury	110 kg	125 kg	235 kg	15
77 kg	Jack Oliver	121 kg	148 kg	269 kg	8
105 kg	Gurbinder Cheema	150 kg	178 kg	328 kg	5
+105 kg	Joe Muskett	142 kg	172 kg	314 kg	5

Men – EAD (Powerlifting)

Event	Athlete	Weights Lifted	Factored Weight	Rank
Bench Press	Ali Jawad	167.5 kg	182.3 kg	5
Bench Press	Chris Rattenberry	165.0 kg	147.3 kg	15

Women

Event	Athlete	Weights Lifted		Total Lifted	Rank
Event	Athlete	Snatch	Clean & Jerk	Total Lifted	Rank
53 kg	Jo Calvino	66 kg	93 kg	159 kg	5
58 kg	Zoe Smith	85 kg	103 kg	188 kg	Bronze
58 kg	Helen Jewell	77 kg	93 kg	170 kg	9
63 kg	Emily Godley	No Lift	No Lift	DNF	-
69 kg	Kerri Wotenick	75 kg	90 kg	165 kg	11

Women – EAD (Powerlifting)

Event	Athlete	Weights Lifted	Factored Weight	Rank
Bench Press	Zoe Newson	85 kg	100.4 kg	4

== Wrestling ==
Team England consisted of 12 athletes over 13 events.

Medal Tally

Gold	Silver	Bronze	TOTAL
1	1	2	4

Men's Freestyle

Weight Class	Wrestler	Round of 16	Quarter Final	Semi Final	Repechage 1	Repechage 2	Final	Rank
Weight Class	Wrestler	Opposition Result	Opposition Result	Opposition Result	Opposition Result	Opposition Result	Opposition Result	Rank
55 kg	Scott Gregory	BYE	(Scotland) McKenna (SCO); W 3–1	(Nigeria) Welson (NGR); L 1–3	BYE	(Wales) Pilling (WAL); L 1–3	-	=5
60 kg	Sasha Madyarchyk	(Sri Lanka) Kumara (SRI); W 5–0	(Kenya) Tumto (KEN); W 5–0	(India) Dutt (IND); L 1–3	BYE	(South Africa) Loots (RSA); W 5–4	Bronze Final: (Nigeria) Amas (NGR); W 5–0	Bronze
66 kg	Philip Roberts	(Kenya) Munene (KEN); W 5–0	(Nigeria) Joseph (NGR); W 3–0	(South Africa) Barnes (RSA); L 0–3	BYE	(South Africa) Barnes (RSA); L 0–3	-	=5
74 kg	Michael Grundy	BYE	(India) Yadav (IND); L 1–7	-	BYE	(Canada) MacDonald (CAN); L 4–10	-	=5
84 kg	Jag Bhullar	(Australia) Kapaufs (AUS); L 1–3	-	-	-	-	-	9
96 kg	Leon Rattigan	(India) Maan (IND); W 3–1	(South Africa) Van Huyssteen (RSA); W 3–1	(Nigeria) Boltic (2010); L 1–3	BYE	(Northern Ireland) Montgomery (NIR); W 5–0	Bronze Final: (Pakistan) Umar (PAK); W 3–1	Bronze
120 kg	Mark Cocker	-	(India) Kumar (IND); L 0–3	-	(Australia) Roberts (AUS); L 0–3	-	-	=5

Men's Greco-Roman

Weight Class	Wrestler	Round of 16	Quarter Final	Semi Final	Repechage 1	Repechage 2	Final	Rank
Weight Class	Wrestler	Opposition Result	Opposition Result	Opposition Result	Opposition Result	Opposition Result	Opposition Result	Rank
60 kg	Terence Bosson		(Pakistan) Afaq (PAK); W 13–1	(South Africa) Loots (RSA); W 9–0			(India) Singh (IND); L 0–9	Silver
66 kg	Myroslav Dykun		(India) Kumar (IND); W 6–0	(Australia) O'Brien (AUS); W 11–0			(Canada) Bond (CAN); W 4–0	Gold
84 kg	Mohamed Osman		(South Africa) Van Zul (RSA); L 1–3	-	-	-	-	9
120 kg	Mark Cocker		(Australia) Popov (AUS); L 0–7	-	(India) Dalal (IND); L 0–2	-	-	5

Women's Freestyle

Weight Class	Wrestler	Round of 16	Quarter Final	Semi Final	Repechage 1	Repechage 2	Final	Rank
Weight Class	Wrestler	Opposition Result	Opposition Result	Opposition Result	Opposition Result	Opposition Result	Opposition Result	Rank
51 kg	Joanna Madyarchyk		BYE	(India) Kumari (IND); L 11–0	(Canada) MacDonald (CAN); L 2–16	-	-	=5
59 kg	Louisa Salmon		BYE	(India) Tomar (IND); L 4–0	BYE	(Nigeria) Richard (NGR); L 0–5	-	4

== See also ==
- England at the Commonwealth Games
- England at the 2006 Commonwealth Games
