= Table tennis at the 2010 Commonwealth Games – Women's singles =

The Women's singles competition began on 8 October 2010. There were a total of XX competitors.

== Preliminaries ==
=== Group 1 ===
Team	Pts	Pld	W	L	GW	GL
Ghatak Poulomi (IND)	4	2	2	0	8	0
Owusu-Agyei Efua Ofo (GHA)	3	2	1	1	4	4
Eloi Gem (DMA)	2	2	0	2	0	8

8 October

Ghatak Poulomi (India)	4–0	(Ghana) Owusu-Agyei Efua Ofo
Owusu-Agyei Efua Ofo (Ghana)	4–0	(Dominica) Eloi Gem

9 October

Ghatak Poulomi (India)	4–0	(Dominica) Eloi Gem

=== Group 2 ===
Team	Pts	Pld	W	L	GW	GL
Tan Zhenhua Vivian (AUS)	4	2	2	0	8	0
Worrell Sabrina (BAR)	3	2	1	1	4	4
Matariki Pareina (VAN)	2	2	0	2	0	8

8 October

Tan Zhenhua Vivia (Australia)	4–0	(Barbados) Worrell Sabrina
Worrell Sabrinao (Barbados)	4–0	(Vanuatu) Matariki Pareina

9 October

Tan Zhenhua Vivia (Australia)	4–0	(Vanuatu) Matariki Pareina

=== Group 3 ===
Team	Pts	Pld	W	L	GW	GL
Kumaresan Shamini (IND)	4	2	2	0	8	0
Nimal Fathimath Juman (MDV)	3	2	1	1	4	4
Gyasi Beatrice Pokua (GHA)	2	2	0	2	0	8

8 October

Kumaresan Shamini (India)	4–0	(Maldives) Nimal Fathimath Juman
Nimal Fathimath Juman (Maldives)	4–0	(Ghana) Gyasi Beatrice Pokua

9 October

Kumaresan Shamini (India)	4–0	(Ghana) Gyasi Beatrice Pokua

=== Group 4 ===
Team	Pts	Pld	W	L	GW	GL
Owen Naomi (WAL)	2	1	1	0	4	0
Nalubanga Lindah (UGA)	1	1	0	1	0	4
Baah-Danso Celia (GHA)	Withdrawn					

8 October

Owen Naomi (Wales)	4–0	(Uganda) Nalubanga Lindah

=== Group 5 ===
Team	Pts	Pld	W	L	GW	GL
Edem Offiong (NGR)	4	2	2	0	8	0
Mwaisyula Neema De (TAN)	3	2	1	1	4	5
Dover Larrysa (DMA)	2	2	0	2	1	8

8 October

Edem Offiong (Nigeria)	4–0	(Tanzania) Mwaisyula Neema De
Mwaisyula Neema De (Tanzania)	4–1	(Dominica) Dover Larrysa

9 October

Edem Offiong (Nigeria)	4–0	(Dominica) Dover Larrysa

=== Group 6 ===
Team	Pts	Pld	W	L	GW	GL
Yang Sun (NZL)						
{{flagCGFathlete[Megan Phillips|WAL|2010}}						
Janice Mellie (SEY)						

=== Group 7 ===
Team	Pts	Pld	W	L	GW	GL
Soo Chiu (MAS)						
Angharad Phillips (WAL)						
Mwamvita Mohamed (TAN)						

=== Group 8 ===
Team	Pts	Pld	W	L	GW	GL
Sara Yuen (CAN)						
Chrissy Mwenebungu (MAW)						
Liopa Santhy (VAN)						

=== Group 9 ===
Team	Pts	Pld	W	L	GW	GL
Peri Innes-Campbell (AUS)						
Sherrice Felix (BAR)						
Sejal Thakkar (KEN)						

=== Group 10 ===
Team	Pts	Pld	W	L	GW	GL
Annie Yang (NZL)						
Dawn Morgan (GUE)						
Jaisina Newaj (MRI)						

=== Group 11 ===
Team	Pts	Pld	W	L	GW	GL
Alice Loveridge (GUE)						
Ashley Givan (NIR)						
Kavindi Sahabandu (SRI)						

=== Group 12 ===
Team	Pts	Pld	W	L	GW	GL
Prabhu Mamta (IND)						
Anolyn Lulu (VAN)						
Sheetal Goodur (MRI)						

=== Group 13 ===
Team	Pts	Pld	W	L	GW	GL
Charlotte Carey (WAL)						
Karina Lefevre (ENG)						
Valenica Maina (KEN)						

=== Group 14 ===
Team	Pts	Pld	W	L	GW	GL
Ganiat Ogundele (NGR)						
Claire Nelson (NIR)						
Christy Bristol (SEY)						

=== Group 15 ===
Team	Pts	Pld	W	L	GW	GL
Hannah Hicks (ENG)						
Nu Gonapinuwala (SRI)						
Rose Kikwa (TAN)						

=== Group 16 ===
Team	Pts	Pld	W	L	GW	GL
Jenny Hung (NZL)						
Anqi Luo (CAN)						
Beatrice Mwanyali (MAW)						

=== Group 17 ===
Team	Pts	Pld	W	L	GW	GL
Amanda Mogey (NIR)						
Olaide Atinuke (NGR)						
Akosua Ketu (GHA)						

=== Group 18 ===
Team	Pts	Pld	W	L	GW	GL
Xiao Fan (MAS)						
Ishara Manikku (SRI)						
Halima Hussain (NGR)						

=== Group 19 ===
Team	Pts	Pld	W	L	GW	GL
Aomin Chen (AUS)						
Kay Chivers (GUE)						
Mueena Mohamed (MDV)						
Amina Lukaaya (UGA)						

=== Group 20 ===
Team	Pts	Pld	W	L	GW	GL
Janet Effiom (NGR)						
Carmen Lee (CAN)						
Amina Kibone (UGA)						
Afnan Ibrahim (MDV)						

== Elimination rounds ==
=== First quarter ===
Round 1; 10 October
Feng T (SIN)
Bye
A Chen (AUS)
G Ogundele (NGR)
H Hicks (ENG)
Bye
Bye
M Patkar (IND)
M Miao (AUS)
Bye
Bye
C Carey (WAL)
A Yang (NZL)
Bye
Bye
LW Beh (MAS)

Round 2; 11 October
Feng T (SIN)	11	11	11	11
A Chen (AUS)	4	2	8	1
H Hicks (ENG)
M Patkar (IND)
M Miao (AUS)
C Carey (WAL)
A Yang (NZL)
LW Beh (MAS)

Round 3; 11 October
Feng T (SIN)	11	3	11	10	11	11
M Patkar (IND)	5	11	2	12	2	7
M Miao (AUS)	9	4	11	11	6
LW Beh (MAS)	11	11	2	13	11

Quarterfinals; 12 October
Feng T (SIN)	11	13	11	11
LW Beh (MAS)	3	11	3	7

=== Second quarter ===
Round 1; 10 October
Li J (SIN)
Bye
Bye
P Mamta (IND)
J Hung (NZL)
Bye
Bye
J Parker (ENG)
L Na (NIR)
Bye
Bye
P Ghatak (IND)
P Campbell-Innes (AUS)
XJ Fan (MAS)
Bye
Sun B (SIN)

Round 2; 11 October
Li J (SIN)	11	11	11	11
P Mamta (IND)	7	4	7	9
J Hung (NZL)
J Parker (ENG)
L Na (NIR)	8	11	5	11	10	13	11
P Ghatak (IND)	11	8	11	7	12	11	8
XJ Fan (MAS)
Sun B (SIN)

Round 3; 11 October
Li J (SIN)	11	10	11	11	11
J Parker (ENG)	7	12	7	8	1
L Na (NIR)	5	6	6	8
Sun B (SIN)	11	11	11	11

Quarterfinals; 12 October
Li J (SIN)	14	6	8	11	11	13	9
Sun B (SIN)	16	11	11	9	6	11	11

=== Third quarter ===
Round 1; 10 October
Yu M (SIN)
Bye
A Mogey (NIR)
SJ Chiu (MAS)
S Yuen (CAN)
Bye
Bye
M Das (IND)
K Li (NZL)
Bye
Bye
V Tan (AUS)
O Edem (NGR)
Bye
Bye
K Sibley (ENG)

Round 2; 11 October
Yu M (SIN)
SJ Chiu (MAS)
S Yuen (CAN)
M Das (IND)
K Li (NZL)
V Tan (AUS)
O Edem (NGR)
K Sibley (ENG)

Round 3; 11 October
Yu M (SIN)	11	11	11	11
M Das (IND)	3	5	4	3
V Tan (AUS)	11	11	11	7	11
K Sibley (ENG)	4	6	8	11	5

Quarterfinals; 12 October
Yu M (SIN)	11	11	11	7	11
V Tan (AUS)	8	8	5	11	4

=== Fourth quarter ===
Round 1; 10 October
Lay JF (AUS)
Bye
Bye
N Owen (WAL)
Sun Y (NZL)
Bye
Bye
Ng SK (MAS)
Zhang M (CAN)
Bye
Bye
S Kumaresan (IND)
A Loveridge (GUE)
J Effiom (NGR)
Bye
Wang Y (SIN)

Round 2; 11 October
Lay JF (AUS)
N Owen (WAL)
Sun Y (NZL)
Ng SK (MAS)
Zhang M (CAN)
S Kumaresan (IND)
J Effiom (NGR)
Wang Y (SIN)

Round 3; 11 October
Lay JF (AUS)	9	2	11	9	11	8
Ng SK (MAS)	11	11	7	11	6	11
Zhang M (CAN)	4	11	5	7	8
Wang Y (SIN)	11	7	11	11	11

Quarterfinals; 12 October
Ng SK (MAS)	10	5	6	9
Wang Y (SIN)	12	11	11	11

=== Semifinals ===
Semifinals; 13 October
1	Feng Tianwei (SIN)	13	11	11	11
Sun Beibei (SIN)	11	6	8	4
Yu Mengyu (SIN)	11	9	11	11	8	11
2	Wang Yuegu (SIN)	7	11	3	8	11	5

Gold Medal Match; 13 October
1	Feng Tianwei (SIN)	11	7	11	11	11
Yu Mengyu (SIN)	8	11	8	5	7
Bronze Medal Match
Sun Beibei (SIN)	5	11	9	6	11	11	8
2	Wang Yuegu (SIN)	11	5	11	11	8	8	11

== See also ==
- 2010 Commonwealth Games
- Table tennis at the 2010 Commonwealth Games
