= Table tennis at the 2010 Commonwealth Games – Mixed doubles =

The Mixed doubles competition began on 10 October 2010. There were a total of XX competitors.

== First quarter ==
Round 1; 10 October
43	D Pitiyage Don Silva (SRI); K Sahabandu (SRI)
22	P McCreery (NIR); Liu N (NIR)
17	J Han (AUS); V Tan (AUS)
33	M Phillips (WAL); P Thomas (WAL)
54	L Liundi (TAN); N Dennis Mwaisyula (TAN)
11	D Knight (ENG); K Sibley (ENG)
12	MS Ibrahim (MAS); LW Beh (MAS)
52	B Chan Yook Fo (MRI); J Newaj (MRI)
42	H Lulu (VAN); L Santhy (VAN)
17	PL Hinse (CAN); S Yuen (CAN)
25	O Atinuke (NGR); S Ajetunmobi (NGR)
38	K Chivers (GGY); M Stubbington (GGY)
44	G Sultan (SEY); J Mellie (SEY)
7	S Kamal (IND); S Kumaresan (IND)

Round 2; 10 October
1	Feng T (SIN); Gao N (SIN)	11	11	11
22	P McCreery (NIR); Liu N (NIR)	9	6	7
17	J Han (AUS); V Tan (AUS)
11	D Knight (ENG); K Sibley (ENG)
12	MS Ibrahim (MAS); LW Beh (MAS)
PL Hinse (CAN); S Yuen (CAN)
O Atinuke (NGR); S Ajetunmobi (NGR)
S Kamal (IND); S Kumaresan (IND)

Round 3; 11 October
1	Feng T (SIN); Gao N (SIN)	9	11	11	11
11	D Knight (ENG); K Sibley (ENG)	11	7	7	6
12	MS Ibrahim (MAS); LW Beh (MAS)	11	9	11	11
S Kamal (IND); S Kumaresan (IND)	4	11	6	9

Quarterfinals; 11 October
1	Feng T (SIN); Gao N (SIN)	11	11	11
12	MS Ibrahim (MAS); LW Beh (MAS)	7	8	8

== Second quarter ==
Round 1; 10 October
8	Pang XJ (SIN); Yu M (SIN)
36	D Morgan (GGY); O Langlois (GGY)
35	B Jayasingha (SRI); N. G. Vithanage (SRI)
32	A Phillips (WAL); S Jenkins (WAL)
21	D Reed (ENG); K Lefevre (ENG)
37	C Tan (MAS); XJ Fan (MAS)
50	M Mohamed (MDV); T Saeed (MDV)
15	M Merotohun (NGR); O Edem (NGR)
10	A Ho (CAN); A Luo (CAN)
63	B Mwanyali (MAW); F Massah (MAW)
47	A Ketu (GHA); F Lartey (GHA)
30	M Das (IND); S Saha (IND)
31	K Farley (BAR); S Felix (BAR)
59	P Matariki (VAN); R Benjamin (VAN)
A Lukaaya (UGA); KM Evans (UGA)
4	W Henzell (AUS); M Miao (AUS)

Round 2; 10 October
8	Pang XJ (SIN); Yu M (SIN)
A Phillips (WAL); S Jenkins (WAL)
D Reed (ENG); K Lefevre (ENG)
M Merotohun (NGR); O Edem (NGR)
A Ho (CAN); A Luo (CAN)
M Das (IND); S Saha (IND)
K Farley (BAR); S Felix (BAR)
W Henzell (AUS); M Miao (AUS)

Round 3; 11 October
8	Pang XJ (SIN); Yu M (SIN)	11	12	11
M Merotohun (NGR); O Edem (NGR)	7	10	7
A Ho (CAN); A Luo (CAN)	2	7	11	7
4	W Henzell (AUS); M Miao (AUS)	11	11	7	11

Quarterfinals; 11 October
8	Pang XJ (SIN); Yu M (SIN)	11	6	6
4	W Henzell (AUS); M Miao (AUS)	13	11	11

== Third quarter ==
Round 1; 10 October
3	Cai X (SIN); Li J (SIN)
39	J Effiom (NGR); O Jegede (NGR)
58	A Kibone (UGA); R Nyaika (UGA)
26	MS Kho (MAS); KB Chai (MAS)
27	C Lee (CAN); X Thérien (CAN)
48	A Somba (MAW); C Mwenebungu (MAW)
49	A Ibrahim (MDV); M Naseem (MDV)
14	S Roy (IND); P Ghatak (IND)
S Jenkins (WAL); N Owen (WAL)
M-A Dowell (BAR); S Worrell (BAR)
C Swenhele (TAN); M Mohamed (TAN)
NH Oh (AUS); P Campbell-Innes (AUS)
K Goodur (MRI); R Taucoory (MRI)
R Manamendra Gedara (SRI); I Manikku Badu (SRI)
E Jerome (DMA); L Dover (DMA)
P Drinkhall (ENG); J Parker (ENG)

Round 2; 10 October
3	Cai X (SIN); Li J (SIN)
KB Chai (MAS); MS Kho (MAS)
C Lee (CAN); X Thérien (CAN)
S Roy (IND); P Ghatak (IND)
S Jenkins (WAL); N Owen (WAL)
NH Oh (AUS); P Campbell-Innes (AUS)
K Goodur (MRI); R Taucoory (MRI)
P Drinkhall (ENG); J Parker (ENG)

Round 3; 11 October
3	Cai X (SIN); Li J (SIN)	11	11	11
S Roy (IND); P Ghatak (IND)	3	7	6
R Jenkins (WAL); N Owen (WAL)	4	7	4
5	P Drinkhall (ENG); J Parker (ENG)	11	11	11

Quarterfinals; 11 October
3	Cai X (SIN); Li J (SIN)	9	11	11	3	7
5	P Drinkhall (ENG); J Parker (ENG)	11	8	4	11	11

== Fourth quarter ==
Round 1; 10 October
6	A Amalraj (IND); M Patkar (IND)
62	D Abrefa (GHA); E Owusu-Agyei (GHA)
53	A Nibourette (SEY); C Bristol (SEY)
18	G Ogundele (NGR); Q Aruna (NGR)
20	KB Chai (MAS); SK Ng (MAS)
51	F Nimal (MDV); MM Zahir (MDV)
60	G Eloi (DMA); J Timothy (DMA)
9	P Peter-Paul (CAN); Zhang M (CAN)
13	S Gerada (AUS); JF Lay (AUS)
46	A Ringui (KEN); V Cheptoo Maina (KEN)
40	A Lulu (VAN); Y Shing (VAN)
24	H Hicks (ENG); L Pitchford (ENG)
29	A Loveridge (GGY); G Dodd (GGY)
55	MI Mtalaso (TAN); RM Kikwa (TAN)
34	C Carey (WAL); S Gertsen (WAL)
2	Wang Y (SIN); Yang Z (SIN)

Round 2; 10 October
6	A Amalraj (IND); M Patkar (IND)
G Ogundele (NGR); Q Aruna (NGR)
KB Chai (MAS); SK Ng (MAS)
P Peter-Paul (CAN); Zhang M (CAN)
S Gerada (AUS); JF Lay (AUS)
H Hicks (ENG); L Pitchford (ENG)
A Loveridge (GGY); G Dodd (GGY)
2	Wang Y (SIN); Yang Z (SIN)

Round 3; 11 October
6	A Amarlraj (IND); M Patkar (IND)	11	6	11	11
P Peter-Paul (CAN); Zhang M (CAN)	7	11	6	9
S Gerada (AUS); JF Lay (AUS)	7	3	3
2	Wang Y (SIN); Yang Z (SIN)	11	11	11

Quarterfinals; 11 October
6	A Amalraj (IND); M Patkar (IND)	6	1	5
2	Wang Y (SIN); Yang Z (SIN)	11	11	11

== Semifinals ==
Semifinals; 12 October
1	Feng Tianwei (SIN); Gao Ning (SIN)	11	11	11
4	William Henzell (AUS); Miao Miao (AUS)	8	6	7
5	Paul Drinkhall (ENG); Joanna Parker (ENG)	4	9	6
2	Wang Yuegu (SIN); Yang Zi (SIN)	11	11	11

Gold Medal Match; 12 October
1	Feng Tianwei (SIN); Gao Ning (SIN)	6	6	7
2	Wang Yuegu (SIN); Yang Zi (SIN)	11	11	11
Bronze Medal Match
4	William Henzell (AUS); Miao Miao (AUS)	5	11	11	6
5	Paul Drinkhall (ENG); Joanna Parker (ENG)	11	5	13	11

== See also ==
- 2010 Commonwealth Games
- Table tennis at the 2010 Commonwealth Games
