= Table tennis at the 2010 Commonwealth Games – Women's doubles =

The Women's doubles competition began on 11 October 2010. There were a total of 64 competitors in 32 teams.

== Elimination rounds ==
Round 1; 11 October
1	Feng T (SIN); Wang Y (SIN)	11	11	11
22	C Carey (WAL); M Phillips (WAL)	2	3	5
20	Manikku Badu I.M.D. (SRI); Gonapinuwala V. N.N. (SRI)	9	8	5
14	Chiu SJ (MAS); Fan XJ (MAS)	11	11	11
16	A Loveridge (GUE); K Chivers (GUE)	7	11	4	8
31	EO Owusu-Agyei (GHA); A Ketu (GHA)	11	8	11	11
21	C Nelson (NIR); A Givan (NIR)	1	3	5
8	M Patkar (IND); S Kumaresan (IND)	11	11	11
5	J Parker (ENG); K Sibley (ENG)
23	L Anolyn (VAN); S Liopa (VAN)	W
26	M Mueena (MDV); NF Jumana (MDV)	2	1	5
13	S Yang (NZL); J Hung (NZL)	11	11	11
10	V Tan (AUS); P Campbell-Innes (AUS)	11	11	8	11
18	EJ Friday (NGR); Atinuke Olaide N. (NGR)	0	2	11	6
24	S Felix (BAR); S Worrell (BAR)	4	6	8
3	Zhang M (CAN); S Yuen (CAN)	11	11	11
A Luo (CAN); C Lee (CAN)
JF Lay (AUS); M Miao (AUS)
C Bristol (SEY); J Mellie (SEY)
A Yang (NZL); K Li (NZL)
A Phillips (WAL); N Owen (WAL)
M Das (IND); P Ghatak (IND)
J Newaj (MRI); K Goodur (MRI)
A Mogey (NIR); N Liu (NIR)
6	LW Beh (MAS); SK Ng (MAS)
32	G Eloi (DMA); L Dover (DMA)
30	A Kibone (UGA); A Lukaaya (UGA)
15	H Hicks (ENG); K Lefevre (ENG)
11	G Ogundele (NGR); O Edem (NGR)
29	M Mohamed (TAN); N Mwaisyula (TAN)
25	B Mwanyali (MAW); C Mwenebungu (MAW)	4	1	5
2	Li J (SIN); Sun B (SIN)	11	11	11

Round 2; 11 October
1	Feng T (SIN); Wang Y (SIN)	11	11	11
14	Chiu SJ (MAS); Fan XJ (MAS)	2	3	5
31	EO Owusu-Agyei (GHA); A Ketu (GHA)	2	7	5
8	MS Patkar (IND); S Kumaresan (IND)	11	11	11
5	J Parker (ENG); K Sibley (ENG)	7	9	6
13	S Yang (NZL); J Hung (NZL)	11	11	11
10	V Tan (AUS); P Campbell-Innes (AUS)	11	2	11	8	11
3	Zhang M (CAN); S Yuen (CAN)	8	11	4	11	7
JF Lay (AUS); M Miao (AUS)
A Yang (NZL); K Li (NZL)
M Das (IND); P Ghatak (IND)
A Mogey (NIR); N Liu (NIR)
LW Beh (MAS); SK Ng (MAS)
H Hicks (ENG); K Lefevre (ENG)
G Ogundele (NGR); O Edem (NGR)	3	4	3
2	Li J (SIN); Sun B (SIN)	11	11	11

Quarterfinals; 12 October
1	Feng T (SIN); Wang Y (SIN)	11	5	11	11
8	MS Patkar (IND); S Kumaresan (IND)	9	11	6	6
13	S Yang (NZL); J Hung (NZL)	9	11	10	7
10	V Tan (AUS); P Campbell-Innes (AUS)	11	7	12	11
JF Lay (AUS); M Miao (AUS)
7	M Das (IND); P Ghatak (IND)
LW Beh (MAS); SK Ng (MAS)	4	6	6
2	Li J (SIN); Sun B (SIN)	11	11	11

Semifinals; 13 October
1	Feng T (SIN); Wang Y (SIN)	11	11	11
10	V Tan (AUS); P Campbell-Innes (AUS)	4	7	2
Finals; 14 October
1	Feng T (SIN); Wang Y (SIN)	11	11	8	3	8
2	Li J (SIN); Sun B (SIN)	8	8	11	11	11
7	M Das (IND); P Ghatak (IND)	6	6	9
2	Li J (SIN); Sun B (SIN)	11	11	11

Bronze Medal Match; 14 October
4	Vivian Tan (AUS); Peri Campbell-Innes (AUS)	4	7	1
7	Mouma Das (IND); Poulomi Ghatak (IND)	11	11	11

== See also ==
- 2010 Commonwealth Games
- Table tennis at the 2010 Commonwealth Games
