= Table tennis at the 2010 Commonwealth Games – Men's doubles =

The Men's doubles competition began on 10 October 2010. There were a total of XX competitors.

== First quarter ==
Round 1; 10 October
A Yogarajah (MRI); W Li Kam Wa (MRI)
I Shujau (MDV); TA Saeed (MDV)
D Taylor (DOM); E Jerome (DOM)
I McPherson (JAM); K Watson (JAM)
P Thomas (WAL); S Gertsen (WAL)
KM Evans (UGA); R Nyaika (UGA)

Round 2; 11 October
1	S Kamal (IND); S Saha (IND)	11	11	11
A Yogarajah (MRI); W Li Kam Wa (MRI)	5	9	8
B Jayasingha (SRI); R Manamendra Gedara (SRI)
S Gerada (AUS); J Han (AUS)
I McPherson (JAM); K Watson (JAM)
T Cogill (RSA); S Overmeyer (RSA)
P Thomas (WAL); S Gertsen (WAL)	7	11	12	8	9
S Ajetunmobi (NGR); A Quadri (NGR)	11	9	10	11	11

Round 3; 11 October
1	S Kamal (IND); S Saha (IND)	9	11	11	8	11
S Gerada (AUS); J Han (AUS)	11	9	7	11	4
T Cogill (RSA); S Overmeyer (RSA)	8	11	2	6
S Ajetunmobi (NGR); A Quadri (NGR)	11	9	11	11

Quarterfinals; 12 October
1	S Kamal (IND); S Saha (IND)	7	11	12	12
S Ajetunmobi (NGR); A Quadri (NGR)	11	5	10	10

== Second quarter ==
Round 1; 10 October
A Johnny (KIR); T Barao (KIR)
L Liundi (TAN); RD Suleiman (TAN)
A Nibourette (SEY); G Sultan (SEY)
H Lulu (VAN); Y Shing (VAN)
C Daniel (SVG); RP Ballantyne (SVG)
C Franklin (GUY); E Lewis (GUY)

Round 2; 11 October
A Baggaley (ENG); L Pitchford (ENG)	11	11	11
L Liundi (TAN); R Suleiman (TAN)	1	6	3
KB Chai (MAS); S Ibrahim (MAS)
H Lulu (VAN); Y Shing (VAN)
PL Hinse (CAN); X Thérien (CAN)
D Shiahale (KEN); P Simon (KEN)
C Franklin (GUY); E Lewis (GUY)	3	3	5
Cai X (SIN); Ma L (SIN)	11	11	11

Round 3; 11 October
A Baggaley (ENG); L Pitchford (ENG)	11	8	9	11	11
KB Chai (MAS); S Ibrahim (MAS)	8	11	11	4	5
PL Hinse (CAN); X Thérien (CAN)	11	5	9	6
Cai X (SIN); Ma L (SIN)	8	11	11	11

Quarterfinals; 12 October
A Baggaley (ENG); L Pitchford (ENG)	6	11	11	11
Cai X (SIN); Ma L (SIN)	11	7	9	4

== Third quarter ==
Round 1; 10 October
K Hunte (SVG); R Spencer (SVG)	5	3	9
M Merotohun (NGR); E Nasiru (NGR)	11	11	11
M Zahir (MDV); M Naseem (MDV)
B Chan Yook Fo (MRI); R Taucoory (MRI)
D Kajubi (UGA); J Migade (UGA)
J Dibbs (JAM); S Tomlinson (JAM)
C Swenhele (TAN); M Mtalaso (TAN)
G Dodd (GGY); O Langlois (GGY)

Round 2; 11 October
D Knight (ENG); P Drinkhall (ENG)	11	11	7	12	11
M Merotohun (NGR); E Nasiru (NGR)	9	3	11	14	13
B Chan Yook Fo (MRI); R Taucoory (MRI)
P Peter-Paul (CAN); A Ho (CAN)
C Howieson (SCO); G Rumgay (SCO)
J Dibbs (JAM); S Tomlinson (JAM)
G Dodd (GGY); O Langlois (GGY)	6	5	4
R Frank (AUS); W Henzell (AUS)	11	11	11

Round 3; 11 October
M Merotohun (NGR); E Nasiru (NGR)	11	11	7	11
A Ho (CAN); P Peter-Paul (CAN)	6	6	11	6
C Howieson (SCO); G Rumgay (SCO)	0	7	9
R Frank (AUS); W Henzell (AUS)	11	11	11

Quarterfinals; 12 October
M Merotohun (NGR); E Nasiru (NGR)	8	10	15	11	11
R Frank (AUS); W Henzell (AUS)	11	12	13	9	13

== Fourth quarter ==
Round 1; 10 October
C Wells (LCA); O Ferdinand (LCA)
C Tan (MAS); MS Kho (MAS)
DT Abrefa (GHA); F Lartey (GHA)
K Farley (BAR); MA Dowell (BAR)
A Rungui (KEN); FA Daim (KEN)
A Somba (MAW); F Massah (MAW)

Round 2; 11 October
A Arputhara (IND); S Roy (IND)	11	11	11
C Tan (MAS); MS Kho (MAS)	5	7	7
DT Abrefa (GHA); F Lartey (GHA)
I Lewis (GUY); P David (GUY)
R Jenkins (WAL); S Jenkins (WAL)
K Lingeveldt (RSA); L Abrahams (RSA)
A Ringui (KEN); FA Daim (KEN)	3	2	3
2	Gao N (SIN); Yang Z (SIN)	11	11	11

Round 3; 11 October
A Arputhara (IND); S Roy (IND)	11	11	11
I Lewis (GUY); P David (GUY)	3	9	8
R Jenkins (WAL); S Jenkins (WAL)	5	13	8	4
2	Gao N (SIN); Yang Z (SIN)	11	11	11	11

Quarterfinals; 12 October
A Arputhara (IND); S Roy (IND)	5	8	6
2	Gao N (SIN); Yang Z (SIN)	11	11	11

== Semifinals ==
Semifinals; 13 October
1	Sharath Kamal (IND); Subhajit Saha (IND)	11	11	7	12	11
Andrew Baggaley (ENG); Liam Pitchford (ENG)	13	7	11	10	6
Robert Frank (AUS); William Henzell (AUS)	2	7	8
2	Gao Ning (SIN); Yang Zi (SIN)	11	11	11

Gold Medal Match; 13 October
1	Sharath Kamal (IND); Subhajit Saha (IND)	9	12	11	5	11
2	Gao Ning (SIN); Yang Zi (SIN)	11	10	4	11	8
Bronze Medal Match
Andrew Baggaley (ENG); Liam Pitchford (ENG)	11	8	12	10	11
Robert Frank (AUS); William Henzell (AUS)	7	11	10	12	6

== See also ==
- 2010 Commonwealth Games
- Table tennis at the 2010 Commonwealth Games
