= Athletics at the 2010 Commonwealth Games – Men's 100 metres =

Men's 100 metres at the 2010 Commonwealth Games
- Dates: 6-7 October
- Winning time: 10.12

Medalists
gold medal	Lerone Clarke	Jamaica
silver medal	Mark Lewis-Francis	England
bronze medal	Aaron Armstrong	Trinidad and Tobago

The Men's 100 metres at the 2010 Commonwealth Games as part of the athletics programme was held at the Jawaharlal Nehru Stadium on Wednesday 6 October and Thursday 7 October 2010.

The top three runners in each of the initial eight heats automatically qualified for the second round. The next eight fastest runners from across the heats also qualified. Those 32 runners competed in 4 heats in the second round, with the top four runners from each heat qualifying for the semifinals. There were two semifinals, and only the top three from each heat advanced to the final and the two fastest runners.

== Records ==
World Record	9.58	Usain Bolt	JAM	Berlin, Germany	16 August 2009
Games Record	9.88	Ato Boldon	TRI	Kuala Lumpur, Malaysia	17 September 1998

== Round 1 ==
=== Heat 1 ===
Rank	Lane	Name	Reaction Time	Result	Notes
1	5	Mark Lewis-Francis (ENG)	0.150	10.15	Q, SB
2	2	Adrian Griffith (BAH)	0.123	10.19	Q, PB
3	6	Aziz Zakari (GHA)	0.172	10.37	Q
4	4	Jeremy Bascom (GUY)	0.187	10.55	q, =PB
5	7	Muhammad Amirudin Bin Jamal (SIN)	0.172	10.63	q
6	8	Nagaraj Gobbargumpi (IND)	0.163	10.69	q
7	9	Jean Baptiste Joel Brasse (MRI)	0.222	10.71	PB
8	3	Ruwan Gunasinghe (PNG)	0.180	10.88	PB

=== Heat 2 ===
Rank	Lane	Name	Reaction Time	Result	Notes
1	9	Md Abdul Najeeb Qureshi (IND)	0.173	10.40	Q
2	2	Aaron Rouge-Serret (AUS)	0.163	10.42	Q
3	3	Allah Laryea-Akrong (GHA)	0.185	10.45	Q
4	5	Marcus John Duncan (TRI)	0.167	10.59	q
5	6	Muhammad Elfi Bib Mustapa (SIN)	0.188	10.73	
6	4	Chavaughn Camarley Walsh (ANT)	0.198	10.82	
7	8	Jack Iroga (SOL)	0.219	11.20	SB
8	7	Felix Mwango (MAW)	0.263	11.58	

=== Heat 3 ===
Rank	Lane	Name	Reaction Time	Result	Notes
1	4	Emmanuel Callander (TRI)	0.162	10.29	Q
2	6	Ramone McKenzie (JAM)	0.156	10.45	Q
3	3	Stephen Arlington William Headley (BAR)	0.178	10.56	Q
4	2	Simon Ihuthia Kimaru (KEN)	0.177	10.87	
5	8	Moses Kamut (VAN)	0.211	11.01	
6	7	Joe Matmat (PNG)	0.234	11.30	
7	9	Musa Alieu Sandy (SLE)	0.174	11.48	
	5	Kicio Welsh (ANG)	–	DQ	

=== Heat 4 ===
Rank	Lane	Name	Reaction Time	Result	Notes
1	9	Oshane Bailey (JAM)	0.192	10.36	Q
2	5	Shehan Abeyptiya (SRI)	0.189	10.48	Q
3	4	Idrissa Adam (CMR)	0.210	10.71	Q, SB
4	6	Lester Jevan Daryl Ryan (MNT)	0.147	10.80	
5	3	Abdoulie Assim (GAM)	0.190	10.87	
6	7	Jason Rogers (SKN)	0.207	10.92	
7	2	Billie Elton Wallbridge-Paea (NIU)	0.198	11.91	
8	8	Suitulaga Tupuiliu (NIU)	0.204	11.98	

=== Heat 5 ===
Rank	Lane	Name	Reaction Time	Result	Notes
1	9	Ogho-Oghene Egwero (NGR)		10.30	Q
2	7	Yeo Foo Ee Gary (SIN)		10.66	Q, PB
3	3	Adam Harris (GUY)		10.66	Q
4	6	Francis Manioru (SOL)		10.99	SB
5	5	Robert Orizu Ibeh (CAY)		11.06	
6	2	Denvil Ruan (ANG)		11.43	
7	8	Alford Seymour Dyett (MNT)		11.70	
	4	Ahmed Ondimba Bongo (MRI)	–	DQ	

=== Heat 6 ===
Rank	Lane	Name	Reaction Time	Result	Notes
1	5	Lerone Clarke (JAM)	0.170	10.28	Q
2	6	Jamial Rolle (BAH)	0.178	10.46	Q
3	8	Brijesh Lawrence (SKN)	0.203	10.60	Q
4	4	Mosito Lehata (LES)	0.178	10.65	q, PB
5	7	Shernyl Burns (MNT)	0.166	10.99	
6	2	Kamin Camara (GAM)	0.188	11.05	
7	3	George Pine (KIR)	0.178	11.28	NR
8	9	Saidi Hamisi Ndayisaba (RWA)	0.179	11.44	

=== Heat 7 ===
Rank	Lane	Name	Reaction Time	Result	Notes
1	9	Peter Emelieze (NGR)	0.184	10.21	Q, SB
2	2	Sam Effah (CAN)	0.183	10.28	Q
3	6	Suwaibou Sanneh (GAM)	0.170	10.41	Q, PB
4	4	Panagiotis Ioannou (CYP)	0.164	10.69	q
5	7	Kieron Rogers (ANG)	0.165	10.81	NR
6	3	Danny D'Souza (SEY)	0.187	10.87	NR
7	5	Xavier Denzel Luani Niuia-Tofa (NIU)	0.160	11.22	
	8	Emile Nissap (VAN)	0.215	DNF	

=== Heat 8 ===
Rank	Lane	Name	Reaction Time	Result	Notes
1	7	Aaron Armstrong (TRI)	0.189	10.35	Q
2	8	Emmanuel Kubi (GHA)	0.169	10.42	Q, PB
3	3	Rodney Green (BAH)	0.162	10.45	Q
4	2	Harold Houston (BER)	0.156	10.58	q, PB
5	4	Krishnakumar Satish Rane (IND)	0.152	10.61	q
6	5	Richard Rohan Junior Richardson (ANT)	0.232	10.70	
7	6	Kupun Wisil (PNG)	0.189	10.95	SB
8	9	Chris Walasi (SOL)	0.193	11.19	

== Round 2 ==
=== Heat 1 ===
Rank	Lane	Name	Reaction Time	Result	Notes
1	7	Mark Lewis-Francis (ENG)	0.156	10.20	Q
2	9	Aziz Zakari (GHA)	0.202	10.27	Q
3	5	Adrian Griffith (BAH)	0.161	10.30	Q
4	6	Md Abdul Najeeb Qureshi (IND)	0.180	10.30	q, =NR
5	3	Marcus John Duncan (TRI)	0.158	10.59	
6	8	Idrissa Adam (CMR)	0.196	10.68	SB
7	4	Foo Ee Gary Yeo (SIN)	0.167	10.75	
	2	Panagiotis Ioannou (CYP)		DNS	

=== Heat 2 ===
Rank	Lane	Name	Reaction Time	Result	Notes
1	4	Oshane Bailey (JAM)	0.166	10.12	Q
2	5	Sam Effah (CAN)	0.190	10.15	Q
3	6	Peter Emelieze (NGR)	0.201	10.21	Q, =SB
4	7	Shehan Abeyptiya (SRI)	0.181	10.31	q, PB
5	2	Harold Houston (BER)	0.136	10.45	PB
6	9	Suwaibou Sanneh (GAM)	0.200	10.47	
7	3	Nagaraj Gobbargumpi (IND)	0.122	10.65	
8	8	Adam Harris (GUY)	0.203	11.88	

=== Heat 3 ===
Rank	Lane	Name	Reaction Time	Result	Notes
1	7	Ogho-Oghene Egwero (NGR)	0.159	10.13	Q
2	4	Emmanuel Callander (TRI)	0.177	10.18	Q
3	6	Ramone McKenzie (JAM)	0.187	10.40	Q
4	8	Stephen Arlington William Headley (BAR)	0.162	10.40	q
5	5	Emmanuel Kubi (GHA)	0.162	10.47	
6	9	Rodney Green (BAH)	0.159	10.50	
7	2	Krishnakumar Satish Rane (IND)	0.157	10.55	
8	3	Muhammad Amirudin Bin Jamal (SIN)	0.195	10.64	

=== Heat 4 ===
Rank	Lane	Name	Reaction Time	Result	Notes
1	7	Lerone Clarke (JAM)	0.156	10.19	Q
2	5	Aaron Armstrong (TRI)	0.164	10.23	Q
3	4	Aaron Rouge-Serret (AUS)	0.151	10.29	Q
4	6	Jamial Rolle (BAH)	0.172	10.39	q, SB
5	9	Allah Laryea-Akrong (GHA)	0.196	10.56	
6	8	Brijesh Lawrence (SKN)	0.175	10.62	
7	3	Mosito Lehata (LES)	0.178	10.63	PB
8	2	Jeremy Bascom (GUY)	0.174	10.63	

== Semifinals ==
=== Semifinal 1 ===
Rank	Lane	Name	Reaction Time	Result	Notes
1	7	Aaron Armstrong (TRI)	0.169	10.14	Q, SB
2	6	Lerone Clarke (JAM)	0.176	10.14	Q
3	9	Aaron Rouge-Serret (AUS)	0.165	10.29	Q
4	4	Ogho-Oghene Egwero (NGR)	0.149	10.31	
5	5	Aziz Zakari (GHA)	0.212	10.32	
6	8	Adrian Griffith (BAH)	0.148	10.35	
7	3	Md Qureshi (IND)	0.182	10.40	
8	2	Shehan Abeyptiya (SRI)	0.257	10.48	

=== Semifinal 2 ===
Rank	Lane	Name	Reaction Time	Result	Notes
1	5	Emmanuel Callander (TRI)	0.140	10.14	Q, =SB
2	4	Sam Effah (CAN)	0.168	10.16	Q
3	7	Mark Lewis-Francis (ENG)	0.151	10.17	Q
4	6	Oshane Bailey (JAM)	0.159	10.20	q
5	9	Peter Emelieze (NGR)	0.182	10.22	q
6	2	Jamial Rolle (BAH)	0.182	10.53	
7	3	Stephen Headley (BAR)	0.169	10.67	
–	8	Ramone McKenzie (JAM)	–	–	DNS

== Final ==
Rank	Lane	Name	Reaction Time	Result	Notes
1st place, gold medalist(s)	7	Lerone Clarke (JAM)	0.165	10.12	
2nd place, silver medalist(s)	8	Mark Lewis-Francis (ENG)	0.148	10.20	
3rd place, bronze medalist(s)	5	Aaron Armstrong (TRI)	0.158	10.24	
4	4	Emmanuel Callander (TRI)	0.196	10.25	
5	9	Aaron Rouge-Serret (AUS)	0.180	10.30	
6	3	Peter Emelieze (NGR)	0.182	10.31	
7	6	Sam Effah (CAN)	0.171	10.37	
–	2	Oshane Bailey (JAM)	–	–	DNS
