= Table tennis at the 2010 Commonwealth Games – Men's singles =

Table tennis at the 2010 Commonwealth Games men's singles competition began on 9 October 2010 and concluded on 14 October. Sharath Kamal Achanta was the defending champion but lost to Yang Zi in semi-finals. Yang Zi went on to win the gold medal defeating top seed Gao Ning in final. Sharath Kamal won bronze medal by defeating compatriot Soumyadeep Roy.

== Elimination rounds ==
=== First quarter ===
Round 1; 10 October
Gao N (SIN)
Bye
MS Kho (MAS)	11	11	11	11
S Jenkins (WAL)
A Baggaley (ENG)
Bye
S Ajetunmobi (NGR)
T Cogill (RSA)
G Dodd (GGY)
M Yiangou (CYP)
P Peter-Paul (CAN)
Bye
J Han (AUS)
PA David (GUY)
Bye
A Amalraj (IND)

Round 2; 11 October
Gao N (SIN)
MS Kho (MAS)
A Baggaley (ENG)
S Ajetunmobi (NGR)
M Yiangou (CYP)
P Peter-Paul (CAN)
J Han (AUS)
A Amalraj (IND)

Round 3; 11 October
Gao N (SIN)
A Baggaley (ENG)
M Yiangou (CYP)
A Amalraj (IND)

Quarterfinals; 12 October
Gao N (SIN)	11	4	11	11	11
A Amalraj (IND)	1	11	5	5	7

=== Second quarter ===
Round 1; 10 October
Cai X (SIN)
Bye
R Jenkins (WAL)
R Frank (AUS)
D Reed (ENG)
R Manamendra (SRI)
Q Aruna (NGR)
Bye
S Roy (IND)
Bye
R Taucoory (MRI)
C Howieson (SCO)
W Henzell (AUS)
Bye
X Thérien (CAN)
L Abrahams (RSA)

Round 2; 11 October
Cai X (SIN)
R Jenkins (WAL)
D Reed (ENG)
Q Aruna (NGR)
S Roy (IND)
C Howieson (SCO)
W Henzell (AUS)
X Therien (CAN)

Round 3; 11 October
Cai X (SIN)
D Reed (ENG)
S Roy (IND)
W Henzell (AUS)

Quarterfinals; 12 October
Cai X (SIN)	7	11	10	5	11
S Roy (IND)	11	5	12	11	13

=== Third quarter ===
Round 1; 10 October
Yang Z (SIN)
Bye
L Pitchford (ENG)
D Pitiyage Don Silva (SRI)
S Saha (IND)
Bye
Nam HO (AUS)
P Thomas (WAL)
A Ravichandran (IND)
Bye
KB Chai (MAS)
Pang XJ (SIN)
PL Hinse (CAN)
OB Jegede (NGR)
Bye
P Drinkhall (ENG)

Round 2; 11 October
Yang Z (SIN)
L Pitchford (ENG)
S Saha (IND)
Nam HO (AUS)
A Ravichandran (IND)
Xue JP (SIN)
OB Jegede (NGR)
P Drinkhall (ENG)

Round 3; 11 October
Yang Z (SIN)
S Saha (IND)
A Ravichandran (IND)
P Drinkhall (ENG)

Quarterfinals; 12 October
Yang Z (SIN)	11	12	8	8	11	11
P Drinkhall (ENG)	6	10	11	11	9	5

=== Fourth quarter ===
Round 1; 10 October
Ma L (SIN)
Bye
S Gerada (AUS)	11	11	11	11
A Ho (CAN)
D Knight (ENG)
I Lewis (GUY)
M Merotohun (NGR)
Bye
G Rumgay (SCO)
Bye
MS Ibrahim (MAS)
Bye
S Overmeyer (RSA)
O Langlois (GGY)
Bye
2	S Kamal (IND)

Round 2; 11 October
Ma L (SIN)
S Gerada (AUS)
D Knight (ENG)
M Merotohun (NGR)
G Rumgay (SCO)
MS Ibrahim (MAS)
S Overmeyer (RSA)
2	S Kamal (IND)

Round 3; 11 October
Ma L (SIN)
D Knight (ENG)
G Rumgay (SCO)
2	S Kamal (IND)

Quarterfinals; 12 October
Ma L (SIN)	7	3	7	11	6
2	S Kamal (IND)	11	11	11	6	11

=== Semifinals ===
Semifinals; 13 October
1	Gao Ning (SIN)	11	11	11	11
Soumyadeep Roy (IND)	2	2	9	7
Yang Zi (SIN)	9	11	7	11	7	11	11
2	S Kamal (IND)	11	8	11	7	11	5	9

Gold Medal Match; 14 October
1	Gao Ning (SIN)	3	6	11	5	6
Yang Zi (SIN)	11	11	7	11	11
Bronze Medal Match
Soumyadeep Roy (IND)	8	5	10	9
2	S Kamal (IND)	11	11	11	11

== See also ==
- 2010 Commonwealth Games
- Table tennis at the 2010 Commonwealth Games
