= Table tennis at the 2010 Commonwealth Games – Men's team =

The Men's team competition began on 4 October 2010. There were a total of 25 teams.

== Preliminaries ==
=== Group 1 ===
Team	Pts	Pld	W	L	GW	GL
Singapore	6	3	3	0	9	0
Sri Lanka	5	3	2	1	6	4
Guernsey	4	3	1	2	4	6
Maldives	3	3	0	3	0	9

4 October

Singapore	3–0	Guernsey
Sri Lanka	3–0	Maldives

5 October

Singapore	3–0	Sri Lanka
Guernsey	3–0	Maldives

6 October

Sri Lanka	3–1	Guernsey
Singapore	3–0	Maldives

=== Group 2 ===
Team	Pts	Pld	W	L	GW	GL
India	4	2	2	0	6	0
Guyana	3	2	1	1	3	3
Vanuatu	2	2	0	2	0	6
Dominica	Withdrawn					

4 October

India	3–0	Vanuatu

5 October

India	3–0	Guyana

6 October

Guyana	3–0	Vanuatu

=== Group 3 ===
Team	Pts	Pld	W	L	GW	GL
England	6	3	3	0	9	0
Wales	5	3	2	1	6	3
Mauritius	4	3	1	2	3	6
Tanzania	3	3	0	3	0	9

4 October

England	3–0	Mauritius
Wales	3–0	Tanzania

5 October

England	3–0	Wales
Mauritius	3–0	Tanzania

6 October

Wales	3–0	Mauritius
England	3–0	Tanzania

=== Group 4 ===
Team	Pts	Pld	W	L	GW	GL
Nigeria	6	3	3	0	9	0
Scotland	5	3	2	1	6	3
Uganda	4	3	1	2	3	7
Kenya	3	3	0	3	1	9

4 October

Nigeria	3–0	Kenya
Scotland	3–0	Uganda

5 October

Nigeria	3–0	Scotland
Uganda	3–1	Kenya

6 October

Scotland	3–0	Kenya
Nigeria	3–0	Uganda

=== Group 5 ===
Team	Pts	Pld	W	L	GW	GL
Australia	8	4	4	0	12	0
South Africa	7	4	3	1	9	3
Ghana	6	4	2	2	6	6
Malawi	5	4	1	3	3	11
Kiribati	4	4	0	4	2	12

4 October

South Africa	3–0	Ghana
Australia	3–0	Malawi
South Africa	3–0	Malawi
Ghana	3–0	Kiribati

5 October

Australia	3–0	Kiribati
Ghana	3–0	Malawi
Australia	3–0	South Africa
Malawi	3–2	Kiribati

6 October

Australia	3–0	Ghana
South Africa	3–0	Kiribati

=== Group 6 ===
Team	Pts	Pld	W	L	GW	GL
Malaysia	8	4	4	0	12	2
Canada	7	4	3	1	11	3
Jamaica	6	4	2	2	6	6
Saint Vincent and the Grenadines	5	4	1	3	3	10
Saint Lucia	4	4	0	4	1	12

4 October

Canada	3–0	Saint Vincent and the Grenadines
Malaysia	3–0	Saint Lucia
Malaysia	3–0	Saint Vincent and the Grenadines
Jamaica	3–0	Saint Lucia

5 October

Canada	3–0	Jamaica
Saint Vincent and the Grenadines	3–1	Saint Lucia
Malaysia	3–2	Canada
Jamaica	3–0	Saint Vincent and the Grenadines

6 October

Canada	3–0	Saint Lucia
Malaysia	3–0	Jamaica

== Elimination rounds ==
Round of 16; 6 October
Singapore
Bye
Wales	3
Guyana	1
Australia	3
Canada	1
Bye
Nigeria
England
Bye
Scotland	1
Malaysia	3
South Africa	3
Sri Lanka	0
Bye
India

Quarterfinals; 7 October
Singapore	3
Wales	0
Australia	2
Nigeria	3
England	3
Malaysia	0
South Africa	1
India	3

Semifinals; 8 October
Singapore	3
Nigeria	0
England	3
India	1

Finals; 9 October
Singapore	3
England	1
Third place
Nigeria	0
India	3

== See also ==
- 2010 Commonwealth Games
- Table tennis at the 2010 Commonwealth Games
