= Mamta Prabhu =

Indian table tennis player

Personal information
- Full name: Mamta Ashok Prabhu
- Nationality: India
- Born: 1 March 1983 (age 43)
- Height: 1.57 m (5 ft 2 in) (2010)
- Weight: 53 kg (117 lb; 8.3 st) (2010)

Sport
- Country: India
- Sport: Table Tennis
- Club: Thane C.R.I.
- Team: Indian Women's Table Tennis Team
- Turned pro: December 2006
- Coached by: Kamlesh Mehta

Achievements and titles
- World finals: Commonwealth games 2010– Silver
- National finals: India Cup, Shillong– Gold
- Highest world ranking: "356 (July 2010)"
Medal record
Women's table tennis
Representing India
Commonwealth Games
Silver medal – second place	2010 Delhi	Women's team
India Cup
Gold medal – first place	2007 India Cup	Women's team

Mamta Prabhu (Marathi:ममता प्रभू, born 1 March 1983) is a table tennis player from Maharashtra, India. She is an integral part of the Indian women Table Tennis team. As of July 2011, she is ranked 356rd in the overall International Table Tennis Federation (ITTF) women rankings. She stands 4th in the Indian contingent.

== Early life ==
Mamta Prabhu is an alumnus of the S. E. S. high school and junior college, Thane. She started playing Table Tennis at a young age of 8 years in 1991. It was destiny that she started table tennis. Her parents had taken her brother and Mamata for enrolling them in table tennis club nearby her house. It so happened that her Coach Dilip Hate enrolled her brother and suggested her parents to bring her after a year as her height was even below the table. Then she accompanied her brother to table tennis club but was not allowed to play. She used to sit there for hours in one place and watched other kids play till the last player stopped. After observing her doing the same for many days her coach thought she might be interested and asked her to join. One Sunday morning he came to her house and told her we'll go for a tournament, a local district match. After reaching the venue, they were informed that only one entry was available and there were two girls standing, It was decided that a lottery will be held. Before a 9-year could understand what lottery meant to need to pick the chit the other girl already had picked up the chit and she remained standing there, but destiny gave her the entry for her first tournament. She has played through various local clubs during her school life. One of funniest part was she could not stay awake and used to doze off at after 7.30 pm so her parents and brother took special care of her as she could sleep anywhere. At her first state championship after staying on stadium for the whole day she got tired and as usual habit she slept off in the stadium itself. When the team understood that she was missing they searched the whole stadium and found her sleeping in one corner, such was the case that since she was small one of the senior picked her up and carried her to the room .After seeing this her coach just to stop her habit and make her strong started practicing at 7 in evening. In her initial Dilip Hate played a stellar role in shaping her career, to instill discipline in her he closed the club gates even if she was a minute late in the club. At age of 12 she was selected for Petroleum Tabletennis Academy to train under Chinese Coach at Ajmer, Rajasthan. She turned pro in December 2006. She used to play for Central Railway earlier, later switching to Dena Bank.

== Personal ==
Mamta is a BCom graduate from Mulund College of Commerce .She has completed Post Graduate Diploma in Management from Welingkar College. Her main hobby is Surfing Net, reading books, visiting new places and eating new cuisines. She loves to be with children.

== Playing style and equipment ==
Mamta's style of playing is Offensive. She uses Challenger Attack (pimples) and Donic Acuda S-1 on Stiga CR Blade .

== Career ==
=== World Events ===
Mamta Prabhu participated in the recently held Delhi Commonwealth Games, 2010 in India and later in the Guangzhou Asian Games 2010, held in China as a member of the Indian Women table tennis team. In Commonwealth games Mamta was a part of the team that won silver medal for India. India lost 0–3 to Singapore.

In the Asian Games, Mamta beat Mohamed Mueena of Maldives convincingly in the first match of the group in all the three sets with a score of 11–6, 11–6, 11–7 in a span of just 12 minutes contributing to the 3–0 victory of India over Maldives. However India after reaching quarter finals, were beat by China 0–3.

However, in the doubles event while playing with Mouma Das, she went down to the Singaporean pair of Li Jiawei and Sun Beibei, 5–11, 5–11, 2–11.

She also represented India in the 48th World Table Tennis Championship in Shanghai, China. She was also selected in the Chile Open, the American open in 2006 and Golden Racket tournament held in Vietnam. Other events included the International Table Tennis Tournament in DPR Korea in 2009. In the same year, she also represented India in the Indian Open ITTF Protour held at Indore, India. She donned the Indian jersey yet again in the 19th Asian Table Tennis championship held in Lucknow, India.

=== National Championship ===
In the recently held 72nd Senior National & Inter-State Table Tennis Championship, in Kolkata, India, in January 2011, Mamta Prabhu represented the Maharashtra A team. In the singles event, Mamta reached the finals for the first time but lost to current India no. 2, K. Shamini of the Petroleum Sports Promotion Board (PSPB).

In the team event, she won all the matches in the championship taking Maharashtra A to the semi-finals. However, despite winning both the matches in the semifinal, the team lost 2–3 to the strong West Bengal team.

In 2007, she won a gold medal in the Indian Open Table Tennis tournament held in Shillong, India.

== Job ==
Mamta is currently working as marketing manager at Dena Bank and also represents them at tournaments. She is also the Brand Ambassador for Dena Bank . She also featured in a recent commercial by the bank sporting the Indian sport uniform and showing her quality strokes.

== See also ==
- Poulomi Ghatak
- Mouma Das
- Shamini Kumaresan
