= Shooting at the 2010 Commonwealth Games – Women's 50 metre rifle three positions singles =

The women's 50 metre rifle three positions singles event took place at 7 October 2010 at the CRPF Campus.

== Results ==
Rank	Name	Country	Prone	Standing	Kneeling	Final shots	Total
1st place, gold medalist(s)	Alethea Sedgman	Australia	197	185	193	101.0	676.0
2nd place, silver medalist(s)	Ser Xiang Wei Jasmine	Singapore	194	183	194	101.6	672.6
3rd place, bronze medalist(s)	Aqilah Binte Sudhir	Singapore	197	189	191	94.3	671.3
4	Robyn van Nus	Australia	197	186	191	94.5	668.5
5	Jennifer McIntosh	Scotland	198	181	192	96.0	667.0
6	Lajjakumari Gauswami	India	196	186	187	96.4	666.8
7	Nur Mohamed Taibi	Malaysia	196	186	187	96.4	665.4
8	Sian Corish	Wales	197	180	192	93.7	662.7
