= 2010 Commonwealth Games medal table =

Ranking of participants by medal total

The 2010 Commonwealth Games (officially known as the XIX Commonwealth Games), was a multi-sport event held in Delhi, India from 3 to 14 October 2010. It was the first time that India hosted the Commonwealth Games and the second time it was held in Asia after Kuala Lumpur, Malaysia in 1998. A total of 6,081 athletes from 71 Commonwealth Games Associations (CGAs) participated in this Games, competing in 272 events in 21 sports.

Athletes from 36 participating CGAs won at least one medal; athletes from 23 of these CGAs secured at least one gold. Australia led the medal table for the sixth consecutive time with 74 golds and 177 medals overall. Host nation India finished second in the table for the first time in Commonwealth Games history with a tally of 38 golds and 101 medals overall. Botswana, the Cayman Islands and Samoa won their first ever Commonwealth Games gold medals. Australian swimmer Alicia Coutts emerged as the most successful athlete with five gold medals.

== Medal table ==
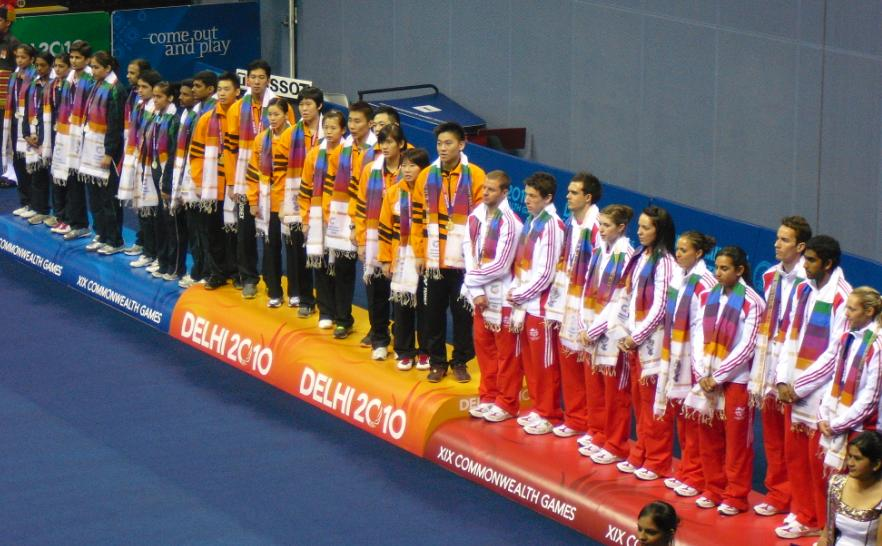
Medalists of the Badminton mixed team event. From the left: India (silver), Malaysia (gold), and England (bronze)

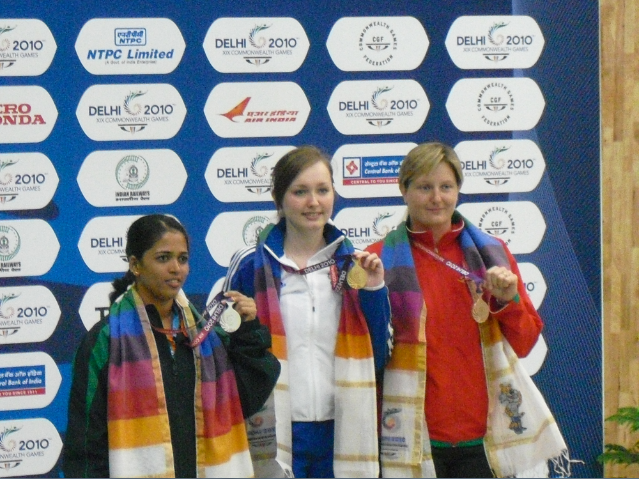
Left to right: Tejaswini Sawant (silver), Jen McIntosh (gold), and Johanne Brekke (bronze) with the medals they earned in 50 metre rifle prone singles women

The ranking in this table is consistent with International Olympic Committee convention in its published medal tables. By default, the table is ordered by the number of gold medals the athletes from a nation have won (in this context, a "nation" is an entity represented by an NOC). The number of silver medals is taken into consideration next and then the number of bronze medals. If nations are still tied, equal ranking is given and they are listed alphabetically by IOC country code.

In Boxing two bronze medals were awarded in each weight class. Additionally there was a tie of three athletes for the third place in the women's pole vault in athletics meant that three bronze medals were awarded. Therefore, the total number of bronze medals is greater than the total number of gold or silver medals.

* Host nation (India)

Rank	CGA	Gold	Silver	Bronze	Total
1	Australia	74	55	48	177
2	India*	38	27	36	101
3	England	37	60	45	142
4	Canada	26	17	34	77
5	Kenya	12	11	10	33
5	South Africa	12	11	10	33
7	Malaysia	12	10	14	36
8	Singapore	11	11	9	31
9	Nigeria	11	8	14	33
10	Scotland	9	10	7	26
11	New Zealand	6	22	8	36
12	Cyprus	4	3	4	11
13	Wales	3	6	10	19
14	Northern Ireland	3	3	4	10
15	Samoa	3	0	1	4
16	Jamaica	2	4	1	7
17	Pakistan	2	1	2	5
18	Uganda	2	0	0	2
19	Bahamas	1	1	4	6
20	Botswana	1	1	2	4
21	Nauru	1	1	0	2
22	Cayman Islands	1	0	0	1
22	Saint Vincent and the Grenadines	1	0	0	1
24	Trinidad and Tobago	0	4	2	6
25	Cameroon	0	2	4	6
26	Ghana	0	1	3	4
27	Namibia	0	1	2	3
28	Sri Lanka	0	1	1	2
29	Guyana	0	1	0	1
29	Papua New Guinea	0	1	0	1
29	Seychelles	0	1	0	1
32	Isle of Man	0	0	2	2
32	Mauritius	0	0	2	2
32	Tonga	0	0	2	2
35	Bangladesh	0	0	1	1
35	Saint Lucia	0	0	1	1
Totals (36 entries)		272	274	283	829

== Changes in medal standings ==
=== Wrestling ===
==== Men's Greco-Roman – 96 kg ====
Silver medallist Hassene Fkiri of Australia was disqualified from the entire competition for making an obscene gesture at the judges. Kakoma Bella-Lufu of South Africa was elevated from bronze to silver. Eric Feunekes of Canada was elevated from 4th to the bronze medal position.

=== Athletics ===
==== Women's 100 metres ====
Sally Pearson, an Australian hurdles specialist, was the initial winner of the gold medal in the women's 100 metres contest. However, the English Commonwealth Association launched an appeal arguing that Pearson had also false started at the same time that Laura Turner was disqualified for doing so. A final decision could not be made before the final as the chief start judge had left the stadium and the starter has no authority to disqualify an athlete. Pearson was disqualified later that night but a delay in communication meant Pearson was only told of the decision against her immediately prior to the medal ceremony. Nigeria's Oludamola Osayomi was promoted to the gold medal, while Natasha Mayers of Saint Vincent and the Grenadines and English athlete Katherine Endacott were elevated to the silver and bronze positions, respectively. On 11 October Oludamola Osayomi was reported to have tested positive for the banned stimulant Methylhexaneamine. She was disqualified from the gold medal position on 12 October and as a result Natasha Mayers and Katherine Endacott was promoted to the gold and silver positions respectively while Bertille Delphine Atangana of Cameroon was promoted to the bronze position.

==== Women's 400 metres ====
On 15 October it was announced that silver medallist Folashade Abugan had been disqualified after testing positive for testosterone prohormone. Aliann Pompey of Guyana was promoted to the silver medal position, with the bronze medal going to Christine Amertil of the Bahamas.

==== Women's 4 x 400 metres ====
Following the positive doping test recorded by Folashade Abugan Nigeria were disqualified from second place. England were promoted to the silver medal position, with the bronze medal going to Canada.

=== Boxing ===
==== Bantamweight ====
On 8 May 2011 Sri Lanka's Manju Wanniarachchi was provisionally disqualified by the Commonwealth Games Federation after testing positive for Norandrosterone during the Games. He had 21 days to appeal the decision but on 26 May announced that he did not wish to file an appeal and retired from the sport. On 6 June 2011 the Commonwealth Games Federation announced Sean McGoldrick of Wales as the new gold medallist. Tirafalo Seoko of Botswana was upgraded from bronze to silver on the basis that he had lost to Wanniarachchi in the semi-finals. Nicholas Okoth of Kenya joins Louis Julie from Mauritius as a bronze medal winner..

== See also ==
- Commonwealth Games Melbourne 2006
