= Table tennis at the 2010 Commonwealth Games =

- Venue: Yamuna Sports Complex
- Location: Delhi, India
- Dates: 4 to 14 October 2010

Table tennis at the 2010 Commonwealth Games was the third appearance of Table tennis at the Commonwealth Games. Competition was held in Delhi, India from 4 to 14 October 2010.

The table tennis events were held at the Yamuna Sports Complex.

== Medal table ==
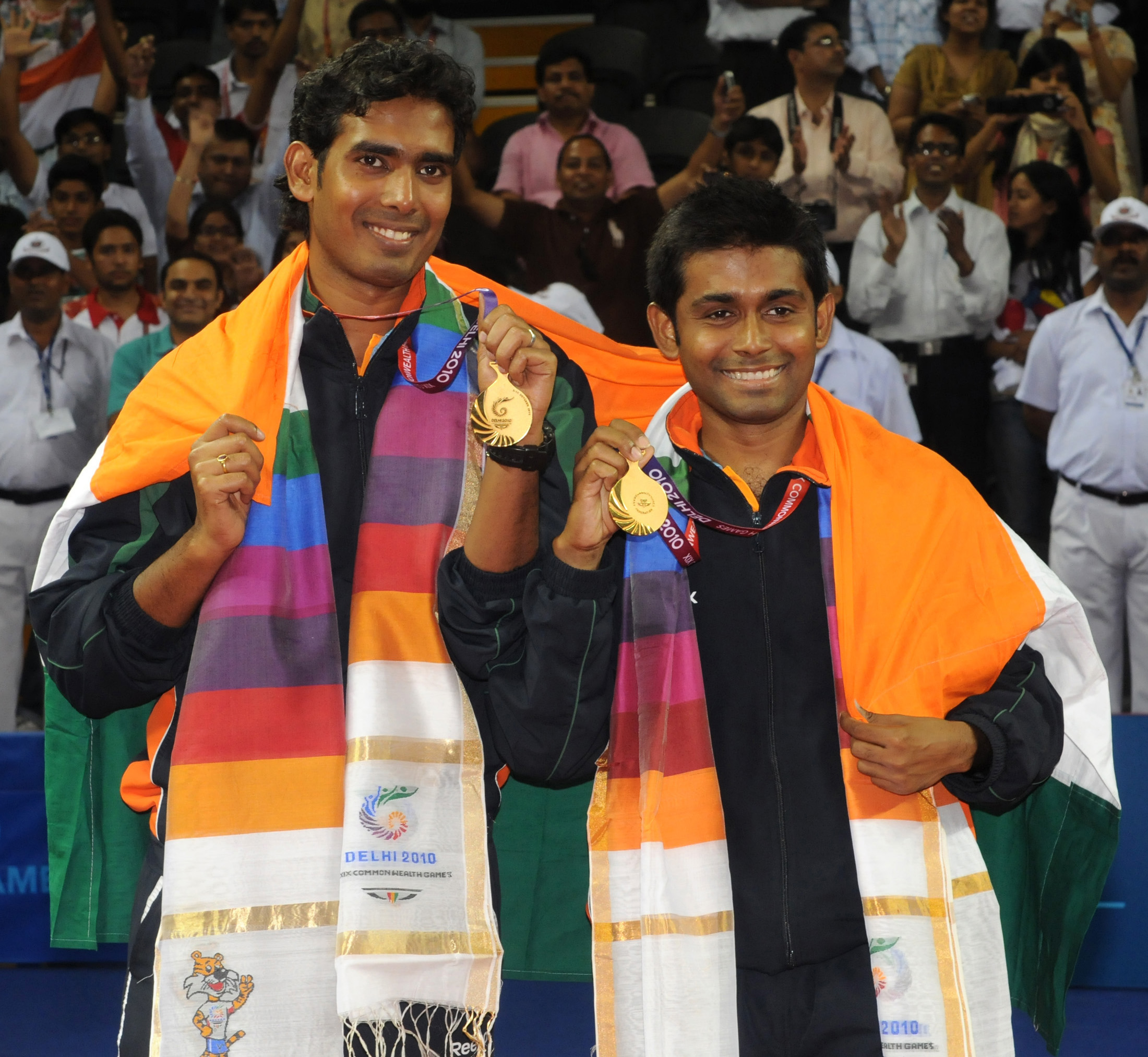
XIX Commonwealth Games-2010 Delhi (Men’s Double Table Tennis Final) Achanta Sarath Kamal & Subhajit Saha of India won the Gold medal, at Yamuna Sports Complex, in Delhi on October 13, 2010

* Host nation (India)

Rank	Nation	Gold	Silver	Bronze	Total
1	Singapore	6	5	1	12
2	India*	1	1	3	5
3	Nigeria	1	0	1	2
4	England	0	1	2	3
5	Australia	0	1	0	1
6	Malaysia	0	0	1	1
Totals (6 entries)		8	8	8	24

== Medallists ==
Event	Gold	Silver	Bronze
Men's singles	Yang Zi; Singapore	Gao Ning; Singapore	Sharath Kamal; India
Women's singles	Feng Tianwei; Singapore	Yu Mengyu; Singapore	Wang Yuegu; Singapore
Men's doubles	Sharath Kamal and Subhajit Saha; India	Gao Ning and Yang Zi; Singapore	Andrew Baggaley and Liam Pitchford; England
Women's doubles	Li Jiawei and Sun Beibei; Singapore	Feng Tianwei and Wang Yuegu; Singapore	Mouma Das and Poulomi Ghatak; India
Mixed doubles	Wang Yuegu and Yang Zi; Singapore	Feng Tianwei and Gao Ning; Singapore	Joanna Parker and Paul Drinkhall; England
Men's team	Singapore Cai Xiaoli; Gao Ning; Ma Liang; Pang Xuejie; Yang Zi	England Andrew Baggaley; Paul Drinkhall; Darius Knight; Liam Pitchford; Daniel Reed	India Sharath Kamal; Anthony Amalraj; Abiishek Ravichandran; Soumyadeep Roy; Subhajit Saha
Women's team	Singapore Feng Tianwei; Li Jiawei; Sun Beibei; Wang Yuegu; Yu Mengyu	India Mouma Das; Poulomi Ghatak; Shamini Kumaresan; Mamta Prabhu; Madhurika Patkar	Malaysia Beh Lee Wei; Chiu Soo Jiin; Fan Xiao Jun; Ng Sock Khim
Women's wheelchair open singles (TT1–5)	Kate Nwaka Oputa; Nigeria	Catherine Morrow; Australia	Faith Chinenye Obiora; Nigeria

== Participating nations ==
- Australia (12)
- Barbados (4)
- Canada (8)
- Cyprus (1)
- Dominica (5)
- England (11)
- Ghana (8)
- Guernsey (6)
- Guyana (4)
- India (13)
- Isle of Man (3)
- Jamaica (4)
- Kenya (8)
- Kiribati (3)
- Malawi (5)
- Malaysia (8)
- Maldives (7)
- Mauritius (6)
- New Zealand (4)
- Nigeria (13)
- Northern Ireland (5)
- Saint Lucia (3)
- Saint Vincent and the Grenadines (4)
- Scotland (3)
- Seychelles (4)
- Sierra Leone (2)
- Singapore (10)
- South Africa (6)
- Sri Lanka (6)
- Tanzania (7)
- Uganda (7)
- Vanuatu (6)
- Wales (8)

== See also ==
- Commonwealth Table Tennis Championships
