= Singapore at the 2010 Commonwealth Games =

- CGF code: SIN
- CGA: Singapore National Olympic Council
- Website: www.singaporeolympics.com

in Delhi, India
- Competitors: 68 in 8 sports
- Flag bearer: Feng Tianwei
- Officials: 34
- Medals Ranked 8th: Gold 11 Silver 11 Bronze 9 Total 31

Commonwealth Games appearances (overview)
- 1958; 1962; 1966; 1970; 1974; 1978; 1982; 1986; 1990; 1994; 1998; 2002; 2006; 2010; 2014; 2018; 2022; 2026; 2030

Singapore competed in the 2010 Commonwealth Games held in Delhi, India, from 3 to 14 October 2010. Singapore competed in 8 out of 17 sports consisting of 68 athletes and 34 officials, making it the largest-ever contingent sent to the Commonwealth Games. Athletes are representing the country in Aquatics, Archery, Athletics, Badminton, Gymnastics, Shooting, Table tennis and Weightlifting. With 11 gold medals won, this is Singapore's best ever Commonwealth Games performance. Table tennis player Feng Tian Wei was the flag-bearer for the opening ceremony.

== Medalists ==
Medal	Name	Sport	Event	Date
Gold	Gai Bin, Lim Swee Hon Nigel	Shooting	Men's 50-metre pistol pairs	5 October
Gold	Ser Xiang Wei Jasmine, Aqilah Binte Sudhir	Shooting	Women's 50-metre rifle three positions pairs	5 October
Gold	Feng Tianwei, Li Jiawei, Sun Beibei, Wang Yuegu, Yu Mengyu	Table Tennis	Women's Team	8 October
Gold	Cai Xiaoli, Gao Ning, Ma Liang, Pang Xuejie, Yang Zi	Table Tennis	Men's Team	9 October
Gold	Ser Xiang Wei Jasmine	Shooting	Women's 10 air rifle singles	10 October
Gold	Gai Bin, Poh Lip Meng	Shooting	Men's 25-metre standard pistol pairs	12 October
Gold	Wang Yuegu, Yang Zi	Table Tennis	Mixed doubles	12 October
Gold	Gai Bin	Shooting	Men's 25-metre standard pistol singles	13 October
Gold	Feng Tianwei	Table Tennis	Women's singles	13 October
Gold	Li Jiawei, Sun Beibei	Table Tennis	Women's doubles	14 October
Gold	Yang Zi	Table Tennis	Men's singles	14 October
Silver	Gai Bin	Shooting	Men's 50-metre pistol singles	6 October
Silver	Ser Xiang Wei Jasmine	Shooting	Women's 50-metre rifle three positions singles	7 October
Silver	Lim Heem Wei	Gymnastics	Women's Balance Beam	8 October
Silver	Gai Bin	Shooting	Men's 10 metre air pistol	8 October
Silver	Ser Xiang Wei Jasmine, Cheng Jian Huan	Shooting	Women's 10 metre air rifle pairs	9 October
Silver	Feng Tianwei, Gao Ning	Table Tennis	Mixed doubles	12 October
Silver	Gao Ning, Yang Zi	Table Tennis	Men's doubles	13 October
Silver	Yu Mengyu	Table Tennis	Women's singles	13 October
Silver	Shinta Mulia Sari, Yao Lei	Badminton	Women's doubles	14 October
Silver	Feng Tianwei, Wang Yuegu	Table Tennis	Women's doubles	14 October
Silver	Gao Ning	Table Tennis	Men's singles	14 October
Bronze	Lim Swee Hon Nigel	Shooting	Men's 50-metre pistol singles	6 October
Bronze	Chan Thuang Tong David-Jonathan	Gymnastics	Men's Pommel Horse	7 October
Bronze	Gai Bin, Lim Swee Hon Nigel	Shooting	Men's 10 metre air pistol pairs	7 October
Bronze	Aqilah Binte Sudhir	Shooting	Women's 50-metre rifle three positions singles	7 October
Bronze	Gai Bin, Poh Lip Meng	Shooting	Men's 25-metre centre fire pistol pairs	9 October
Bronze	Poh Lip Meng	Shooting	Men's 25-metre centre fire pistol singles	10 October
Bronze	Yao Lei, Chayut Triyachart	Badminton	Mixed doubles	13 October
Bronze	Hendra Wijaya, Hendri Kurniawan Saputra	Badminton	Men's doubles	13 October
Bronze	Wang Yuegu	Table Tennis	Women's singles	13 October

Medals by sport
Sport	gold	silver	bronze	Total
Aquatics	0	0	0	0
Archery	0	0	0	0
Athletics	0	0	0	0
Badminton	0	1	2	3
Gymnastics	0	1	1	2
Shooting	5	4	5	14
Table tennis	6	5	1	12
Weightlifting	0	0	0	0
Total	11	11	9	31

== Team Singapore at the 2010 Commonwealth Games ==
Key
Qualifiers / Medal Winners
Top 8 Finish (Non Medal Winners)
Non-Qualifiers / Non Top 8 Finish

== Aquatics ==
=== Swimming ===
Singapore's Swimmers got disqualified in a controversial incident. That occurred after their head coach failed to submit in the entry lists in time. Singapore Swimming Teams Head coach Ang Peng Siong apologized to his team and media after failing to register them on time, that resulted in their disqualification.

Athletes List

Athlete	Event/s
Tao Li	50m Fly (W)
Aaron Yeo Xian Ying	50/100m Free, 50m Relay (M).
Teo Zhen Ren	M 200/400/1500m Free, 4 × 200 m Free Relay
Arren Quek	M 50/100/200m Free, 50/100m Fly, 4 × 100 m Free, 4 × 200 m Free Relay (M)
Mattias Ng Jia Hui	M 400/1500m Free, 4 × 200 m Free Relay
Dzulhaili Kamal	M 100m Free, 50/100m Back, 50/100m Fly, 4 × 100 m Free Relay (M)
Jeremy Kevin Matthews	200/400/1500m Free, 100/200m Back, 200m Ind. Medley, 4 × 200 m Free Relay (M)
Richard Chng Lijie	M 50/100m Free, 50/100m Back, 50m Breast, 4 × 100 m Free Relay (M)

== Archery ==
Vanessa Loh Tze Rong, Wendy Tan Liu Jie & Elizabeth Cheok Khang Leng competed in women's Recurve Team.

== Athletics ==
Mohd Elif Mustapap, Muhd Amirudin Jamal, Lee Cheng Wei, Gary Yeo Foo Er, Calvin Kang Li Loong & U K Shyam all competed in Men's 4 × 100 m Relay, and the Men's 100m Individual. Adam Kamis competed in the parasport's 100m T4G.

== Badminton ==
The Men's Team consisted of Derek Wong Zi Liang, Ashton Chen Yong Zhao, Hendri Kurniawan Saputra, Hendra Wijaya & Chayut Triyachart. The Women's team consisted of Xing Aiying, Fu Mingtian, Yao Lei, Shinta Mulia Sari & Vanessa Neo Yuyan.

== Gymnastics ==
This was the first Commonwealth Games at which Singapore's gymnasts gained medals.

Women's Artistic Gymnastics consisted of Krystal Khoo Oon Hui, Lim Heem Wei, Nicole Tay Xi Hui & Tabitha Tay Jia Hui.

Men's Artistic Gymnastic team consists of Jonathan David Chan, Thuang Tong & Gabriel Gan Zi Jie.

== Shooting ==
Athletes	Events
Zhang Shao Ying	25m Pistol (W)
Teo Shun Xie	F 10m Air Pistol (W)
Aqilah Sudhir	F 10m Air Rifle, 50m Rifle Prone,50m Rifle 3-positions (W)
Ser Xiang Wei Jasmine	F 10m Air Rifle, 50m Rifle Prone,50m Rifle 3-positions (W)
Pheong Siew Shya	F 25m Sport Pistol (W)
Haw Siew Peng	F 10m Air Rifle, 50m Rifle Prone (W)
Fan Xiao Ping	F 10m Air Pistol, 25m Pistol, 25m Sport Pistol (W)
Cheng Jian Huan	F 10m Air Rifle (W)
Zhang Jin	M 10m Air Rifle, 50m Rifle Prone, 50m Rifle 3-positions (M)
Poh Lip Meng	M 10m Air Pistol, 25m Pistol, 25m Centre
Ong Jun Hong	M 10m Air Rifle, 50m Rifle Prone,50m Rifle 3-positions (M)
Nigel Lim Swee Hon	M 10m Air Pistol, 50m Free pistol (M)
Lee Yee	M Skeet (M)
Lee Wung Yew	M Trap (M)
Kasmijian Kimin	M 50m Rifle Prone, 50m Rifle 3-positions (M)
Gai Bin	M 10m Air Pistol, 25m Centre Fire Pistol, 25m Standard Fire Pistol, 50m Pistol (M)
Alex Chow Wei An	M Double Trap (M)
Chiew Huan Lin Eugene	M Skeet (M)
Mohd Zain Amat	Trap, Double Trap (M)

== Table tennis ==
The able tennis team was highly successful at these games.

The men's team consisted of Gao Ning, Yang Zi, Cai Xiaoli, Pang Xue Jie & Ma Liang.

The women's team consisted of Feng Tianwei, Wang Yuegu, Li Jiawei, Sun Beibei & Yu Mengyu.

== Weightlifting ==
Helena Wong Kar Mun was the sole competitor in the weightlifting for Singapore.

Goh Rui Si Theresa also competed in the Powerlifting (Parasports).

== Team officials ==
Coaches

Coach	Sport
Wu Chuan Fu	Weightlifting
Jing Junhong	Table Tennis (Deputy Head Coach Women's Team)
Yang Chuanning	Table Tennis (Head Coach Men's Team)
Loy Soo Han	Table Tennis (Team Manager)
Eddy Tay Han Chong	Table Tennis (Deputy Team Manager)
Zhou Shusen	Table Tennis (Head Coach Women's Team)
Zhang Man Zheng	Shooting (Coach)
Deng Pei Ming	Shooting (Coach)
Zhang Man Zheng	Shooting (Coach)
Zhu Chang Fu	Shooting (Coach)
Yuan Kexia	Gymnastics (Head Coach)
Lin Zhen Qiu	Gymnastics (Coach)
Zhao Qun	Gymnastics (Coach)
Chua Yong Joo	Badminton (Team Manager)
Eng Hian	Badminton (Coach)
Luan Ching	Badminton(Coach)
Melvin Tan Kim Boon	Athletics (Coach)
Park, Young Sook	Archery(Coach)
Jayaseelan s/o Gurunathan	Para-aquatics (Coach)
Ang Peng Siong	Swimming (Head Coach)
Barry Prime	Swimming (Coach)

Sports Medicine Team

Sports Medical	
Dr. Cormac O’Muircheartaigh	Medical Director / Sports Physician
Kelvin Ong Shyun Yee	Sports Physiotherapist
Shane Andrew Hayes	Sports Physiotherapist
Narasiman Sathivelu	Massage Therapist
Willy Koh	Massage Therapist

== See also ==
- 2010 Commonwealth Games
- Singapore at the 2010 Summer Youth Olympics
