= Robert Frank (table tennis) =

Australian table tennis player

Robert Frank (born 22 January 1990, Sandringham) is an Australian table tennis player. He competed for Australia at the 2012 Summer Olympics in the men's team event.
