= Subhajit Saha =

Indian table tennis player (born c. 1981)

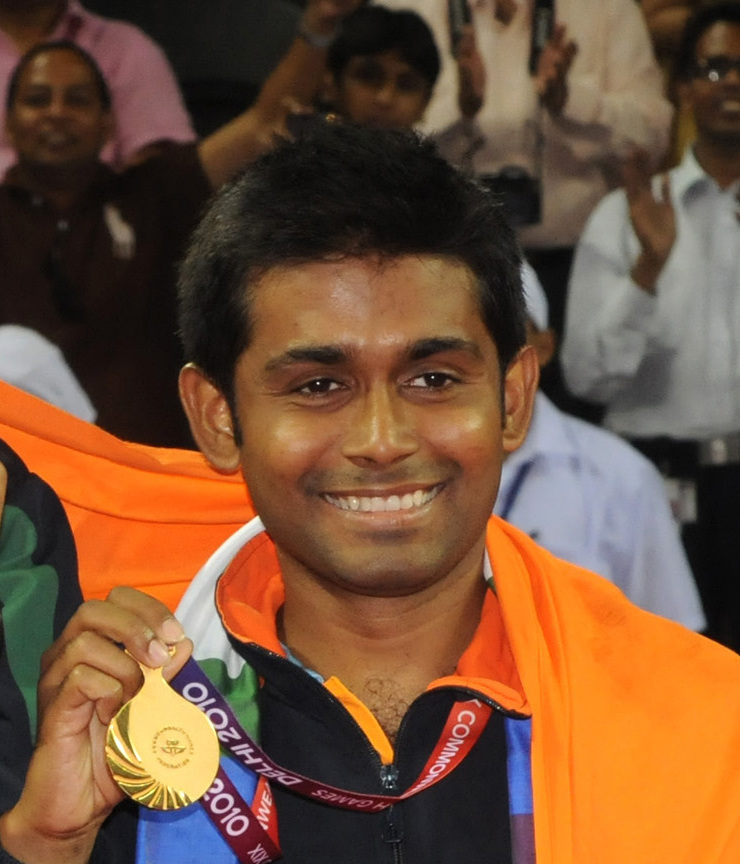
- Saha with gold medal in Delhi on October 13, 2010

Personal information
- Full name: Subhajit Saha
- Born: 1981 or 1982 (age 43–44) India
- Height: 1.7 m (5 ft 7 in)
- Weight: 70 kg (154 lb; 11 st 0 lb)

Sport
- Sport: Table tennis
- Playing style: Right-handed
- Highest ranking: 319
Medal record
Representing India
Men's Table Tennis
Commonwealth Games
Gold medal – first place	2010 New Delhi	Doubles

Subhajit Saha is a professional table tennis player from West Bengal, India. He won the men's doubles gold at the 19th Commonwealth Games' table tennis championship held at New Delhi in 2010.

== Early life ==
Saha is a Bengali and hails from Siliguri in West Bengal.

== Delhi Commonwealth Games ==
At the 2010 Commonwealth Games in New Delhi, he won the gold medal in the men's doubles event with Sharath Kamal.
