= Jenny Hung =

New Zealand table tennis player

Personal information
- Born: 23 March 1991 (age 35) Taipei, Taiwan

Sport
- Sport: Table tennis

Jenny Hung (born 23 March 1991 in Taipei, Taiwan) is a semi-professional table tennis player from Christchurch, New Zealand. She is currently ranked #3 in New Zealand, #19 in Oceania and #662 in the world for Open Women's table tennis. Hung has been the top ranked female junior in New Zealand for the past several years and is a representative player for both Canterbury region and New Zealand. Her most notable achievement came at the 2009 Australian Junior Open, where she became the first New Zealander and the first player from Oceania to win an ITTF Junior Circuit Singles title.

== Achievements ==
=== 2006 ===
Commonwealth Championships - NZ Women's team bronze medal

=== 2007 ===
New Zealand Open Champs - Under 21 & 18 Women's Singles Winner

=== 2008 ===
New Zealand Open Champs - Under 21 & 18 Women's Singles Winner

=== 2009 ===
Australian Junior Open Winner

=== 2010 ===
Oceania Champs - Under 21 Women's Singles Winner
Selected in the New Zealand team for the Commonwealth Games in Delhi

== Playing style ==
Hung primarily employs an at the table, counter-driving style of play. She utilises long serves as well as short serves due to her rallying proficiency, which effectively allows her to capitalise on all but the most aggressive of returns and take control of the point. She consistently slices long on the return of serve, often inducing a weak attacking shot from her opponent that can easily be dispatched for a winner. Because of her flat hitting style, however, Hung has historically struggled against choppers. Recent years have seen the development of her forehand topspin in order to counteract such style players.
