= Miao Miao =

Australian table tennis player

Personal information
- Full name: Miao Miao
- Nationality: Australian
- Born: 14 January 1981 (age 45) Tianjin, China
- Height: 1.62 m (5 ft 4 in)
- Weight: 48 kg (106 lb)

Sport
- Country: Poland; Australia
- Sport: Table Tennis
- Events: Singles, Team
Medal record
Women's table tennis
Representing Australia
Commonwealth Games
| Silver medal – second place | 2006 Melbourne | Women's team |
| Bronze medal – third place | 2006 Melbourne | Women's doubles |
Oceania American Championships
| Gold medal – first place | 2000 Koumac | Team |
| Gold medal – first place | 2002 Suva | Doubles |
| Gold medal – first place | 2002 Suva | Mixed Doubles |
| Gold medal – first place | 2002 Suva | Team |
| Gold medal – first place | 2004 Whangarei | Singles |
| Gold medal – first place | 2004 Whangarei | Mixed Doubles |
| Gold medal – first place | 2004 Whangarei | Team |
| Gold medal – first place | 2006 Geelong | Doubles |
| Gold medal – first place | 2006 Geelong | Mixed Doubles |
| Gold medal – first place | 2006 Geelong | Team |
| Gold medal – first place | 2008 Papeete | Singles |
| Gold medal – first place | 2008 Papeete | Doubles |
| Gold medal – first place | 2008 Papeete | Mixed Doubles |
| Gold medal – first place | 2008 Papeete | Team |
| Gold medal – first place | 2010 Auckland | Doubles |
| Gold medal – first place | 2010 Auckland | Mixed Doubles |
| Gold medal – first place | 2010 Auckland | Team |
| Silver medal – second place | 1998 Bendigo | Doubles |
| Silver medal – second place | 1998 Bendigo | Team |
| Silver medal – second place | 2000 Koumac | Doubles |
| Silver medal – second place | 2002 Suva | Singles |
| Silver medal – second place | 2004 Whangarei | Doubles |
| Silver medal – second place | 2006 Geelong | Singles |
| Silver medal – second place | 2010 Auckland | Singles |
| Bronze medal – third place | 1998 Bendigo | Singles |
| Bronze medal – third place | 2000 Koumac | Singles |
| Bronze medal – third place | 2000 Koumac | Mixed Doubles |

Miao Miao (Chinese: 苗苗; pinyin: Miáo Miao) (born 14 January 1981, Tianjin, China) is an Australian table tennis player who represented Australia at the Sydney 2000, Athens 2004, Beijing 2008 and London 2012 Summer Olympic Games. Her best Olympic result was the quarter-finals of the doubles tournament in Sydney. At the 2006 Commonwealth Games in Melbourne, she won a silver medal in the teams competition and a bronze medal in the doubles with Jian Fang Lay. Her parents immigrated to Poland when she was a child, and later to Australia. She was the highest ranked Australian table tennis player at the time of the 2008 Summer Olympics.Until the 2000 Summer Olympics she was virtually unknown in Australia she is well known in China.

Miao Miao started her international table tennis in 1995. Miao Miao is a right-handed, fast attack shakehand player (height: 1.62 m or 5 ft 4 in). She is coached by her father Miao Cang Sheng (苗仓生) who was a well known coach in China but then became the coach of the Polish women table tennis team in 1994. Miao Miao became the Polish women doubles champion in 1996. Miao Miao migrated to Australia with her father in 1997. She was a 15-year adolescent when she first arrived in Australia but then quickly established her as one of top table tennis players in Australia. Miao became Australian junior champion in singles, doubles and mixed doubles and Australian senior singles champion as well as winning a series of other events both in Australia and abroad. She also has the rare distinction of representing Australia at four successive Olympic games in 2000, 2004, 2008 and 2012.

Her father was a table tennis player and coach, and her mother represented China in sprinting. Miao speaks three languages, Chinese, English and Polish, and she enjoys playing table tennis. She is one of the most successful Australian table tennis players.
