= Madhurika Patkar =

Indian table tennis player

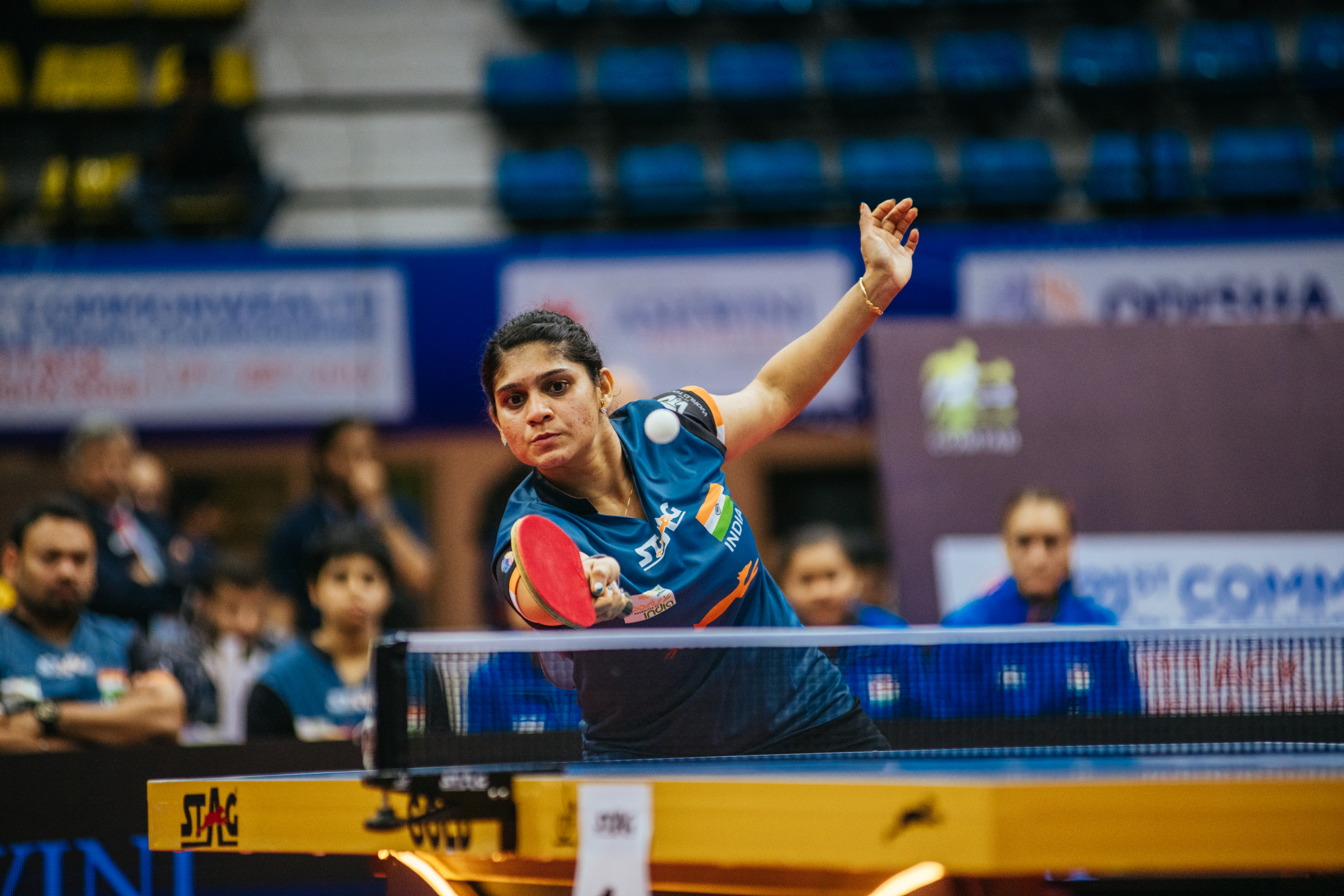

Personal information
- Full name: Madhurika Patkar
- Nationality: Indian
- Born: 10 April 1987 (age 39) Thane, Maharashtra, India

Sport
- Sport: Table tennis
- Playing style: Hand Shake, Aggressive
Medal record
Women's table tennis
Representing India
Commonwealth Games
Gold medal – first place	2018 Gold Coast	Women's team
South Asian Games
Gold medal – first place	2019 Kathmandu/Pokhara	Women's doubles
Gold medal – first place	2019 Kathmandu/Pokhara	Women's team

Madhurika Patkar is an Indian table-tennis player.

She beat serial winner Poulomi Ghatak in Manesar to win the 78th 11Even Sports Senior National and Inter-State Table Tennis Championship in 2016.

In February 2017 Patkar won the Indian national Table Tennis championship in the Women's Singles.

She was a part of Indian trio who defeated Singapore in 2018 Commonwealth Games at Gold Coast and won a gold medal for India.
