= Vivian Tan =

Australian table tennis player

Vivian Tan (Dederko)
Personal information
- Nationality: Australian
- Born: 17 September 1977 (age 48) Shanghai, China
- Height: 1.65 m (5 ft 5 in) (2012)
- Weight: 60 kg (130 lb) (2012)

Sport
- Country: Australia
- Sport: Table tennis

Vivian Tan (Zhenhua Dederko) (born September 17, 1977 in Shanghai, China) is a Chinese-born Australian table tennis player. She competed at the 2010 Commonwealth Games for Australia. She was selected to represent Australia at the 2012 Summer Olympics in table tennis.

== Personal life ==
Tan was born and grew up in Shanghai, China. She went to primary and secondary school in China. She moved to Australia in 2003 and became a citizen in 2007. From 2003 to 2005, she attended Charles Sturt University, where she earned a Bachelor of IT. She was engaged to a man from Poland in 2012. She married him prior to the start of the 2012 Summer Olympics. and changed surname to Dederko. As of 2012, she worked for the North Sydney Leagues Club, and she lived in Killara, as Sydney suburb. She is mother of Olivia.

Tan is 165 centimetres (65 in) tall and weighs 60 kilograms (130 lb).

== Business ==
Tan continues to train amateur table tennis players at Willoughby Squash in Sydney. Combining her interest in health and children, Tan is involved in the production of high quality health products. BellaVita baby formula is the first in a line of health products endorsed by Tan.

== Table tennis ==
Tan is a table tennis player and coach and is based out of the Willoughby Squash Centre. She spends up to eight hours a week training. Starting in 2009, she was coached by Paul Zhao. She has a table tennis scholarship with the New South Wales Institute of Sport.

Tan started playing table tennis when she was six years old after her mother suggested it. She retired from table tennis in 1997. She returned to the sport in 2007.

The 2009 World Team Cup was the first time Tan represented Australia as a member of the national team. In 2010, she was ranked fourth in Australia. She competed at the 2010 Russian hosted World Team Table Tennis Championships. She represented Australia at the 2010 Commonwealth Games in table tennis. She finished 3rd in the singles event at the 2011 Oceania Cup in Adelaide, Australia. She finished 2nd in the singles event at the 2012 Australian Olympic Qualification Tournament in Sydney, Australia. She finished 4th in the singles event at the 2012 Oceania Qualification Tournament in Sydney, Australia. She was selected to represent Australia at the 2012 Summer Olympics in table tennis in the team event. The Australian team had a training camp in England and played a test match against England in the month before the Games. In 2016, Vivian Dederko, who missed most of 2015 after having a baby, and fell short in her bid to qualify for 2016 Olympic Games, won the 2016 ITTF Oceania Cup singles title in Melbourne.
