= Poulomi Ghatak =

Indian table tennis player

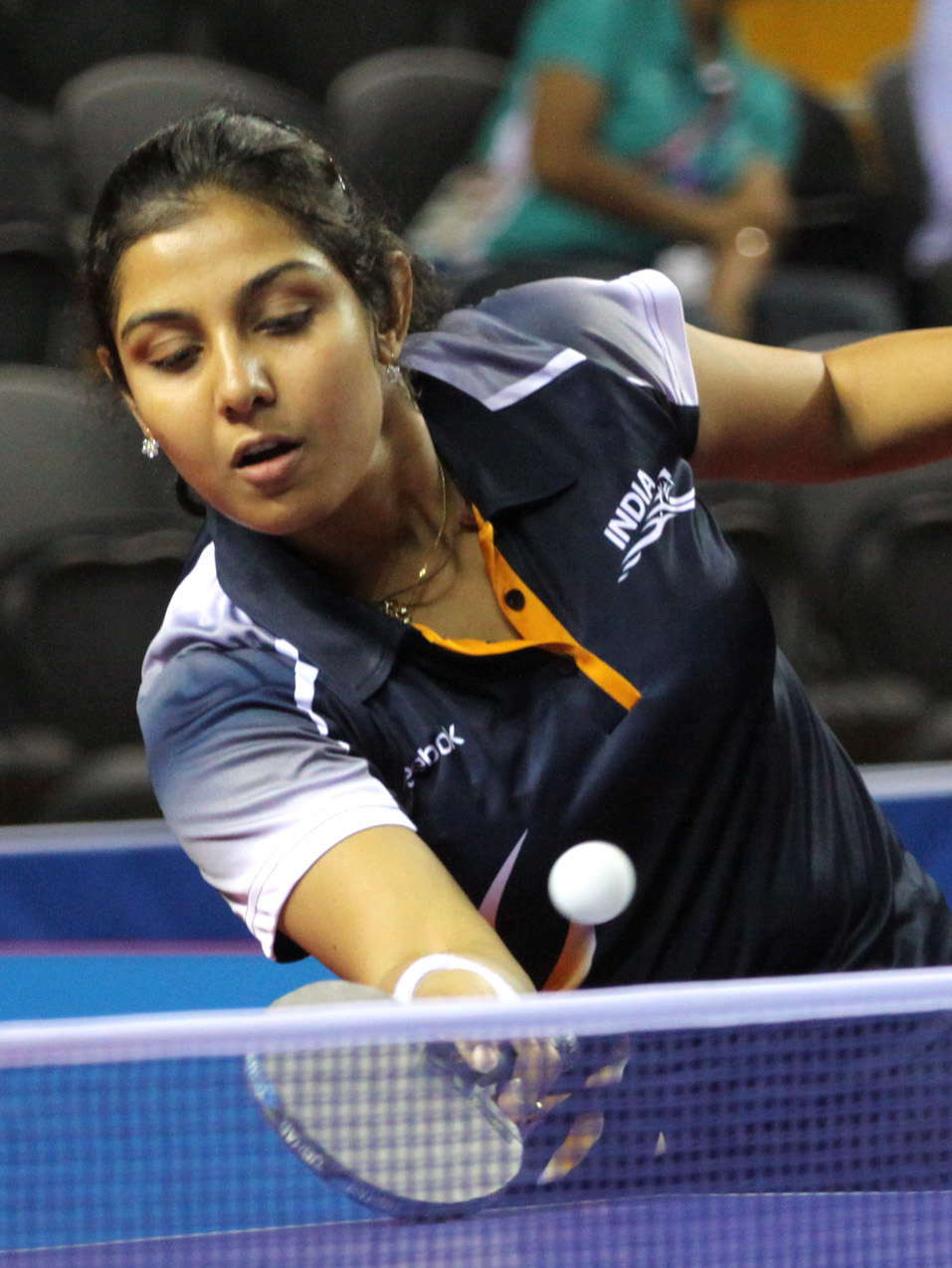
- Ghatak in 2010

Personal information
- Born: January 3, 1983 (age 43) Kolkata, West Bengal
- Spouse: Soumyadeep Roy
Medal record
Women's table tennis
Representing India
Commonwealth Games
Silver medal – second place	2010 Delhi	Women's team
Bronze medal – third place	2006 Melbourne	Women's team
Bronze medal – third place	2010 Delhi	Women's doubles

Poulomi Ghatak (Bengali: পৌলমী ঘটক; born 3 January 1983) is a table tennis player from West Bengal, India. She won three junior national championships (1996, 1998 and 1999) as well as seven senior national championships between 1998 and 2016. In 1998 she won both the senior national and junior national championships. Poulomi has represented India at the Commonwealth Games at Melbourne in 2006 and the Commonwealth Championships between 2000 and 2008. She played at the Sydney Olympics when she was 16. She also played in the Indian Open finals in 2007. She started playing in 1992 and thereafter went on a successful upward learning curve.

Poulomi is ranked #22 amongst women players in India as per the 2018 rankings of the Table Tennis Federation of India.

== Personal life ==
Poulomi Ghatak was born on 3 January 1983 in Kolkata, West Bengal, India. She is daughter of Shubhash Chandra Ghatak, who has been a constant support all throughout her life. She has a knack for painting besides playing Table Tennis. She started her table tennis career at the age of 9.

Poulomi studied at the Nava Nalanda High School, and later at the Jogamaya Devi College, of the University of Calcutta. Soon after the 2010 Commonwealth Games, she married Soumyadeep Roy, professional table tennis player.

== Career ==
She started her table tennis career in 1992 when she was nine years old. She practised regularly at Tollygunge Baisakhi Sangha. She participated in the Olympic Games at the age of 16. She played various matches with Sharath Kamal and Ankita Das. She was ranked Top 2 among the female senior table tennis player.

She represented India in the Asian Table Tennis Championship, Korea; in Russia Open; Toyota Cup at Japan; German and Polish Open; 15th Asian Games at Doha and Chile Open in 2006. In 2007, she played at World Table Tennis Championship at Croatia; Golden Racket Championship, Vietnam and International Open Tournament in Indonesia. In the same year she also represented the country in Austria, France and German Open. She was silver medalist in Common Wealth Games 2010. She had also made to the Table Tennis Quarterfinals in Asian Games 2012. She was also among the probables for Olympics 2012.

Recently, in 2014 she also played in Asian Games along with Ankita Das against Pakistan and made the victory. In the same event she also played mixed doubles with Sharath Kamal but could not make it. Her achievements for her talents are immense. She has three Junior National Championship and five Senior National Championship between 1998–2007 to her name.

Currently, Poulomi works in Bharat Petroleum as the Assistant Manager, Sports; she represents the PSPB.

== Achievements and Honors ==
- Commonwealth 2006 (Bronze)
- Women's Team, SAF Games, 2006 (Gold)
- Women's Doubles, SAF Games, 2006 (Gold)
- Women's Doubles, US Open, 2006 (Silver)
- Commonwealth Championship, 2007 (Bronze)
- National Championship, 2005 (Bronze)
- National Championships, 2006 (Gold)
- Women Singles, National Championship, 2006 (Silver)
- National Championship, 2007 (Gold)
- Women Singles, National Championships, 2007 (Gold)
- Commonwealth 2010 (Silver)

== See also ==
- Mamta Prabhu
- Sharath Kamal
- Shamini Kumaresan
- Nava Nalanda High School
