= Na Liu =

British table tennis player (born 1983)

Personal information
- Nationality: British
- Born: 7 February 1983 (age 42); Liao Ning, China
- Height: 162 cm (5 ft 4 in)
- Weight: 52 kg (115 lb)

Sport
- Sport: Table tennis

Na Liu (born 7 February 1983) is a British table tennis player.

She was born in Liao Ning, China and began playing table tennis at age seven.

Liu has lived in Belfast, Northern Ireland since 2001, gaining British citizenship in 2008.

In 2010, she represented Northern Ireland at the Commonwealth Games in Delhi, India. In 2012, she competed for Great Britain at the Summer Olympics in London, where she landed in the ninth position, after losing three games against Kim Jong.
