= Shamini Kumaresan =

Indian table tennis player

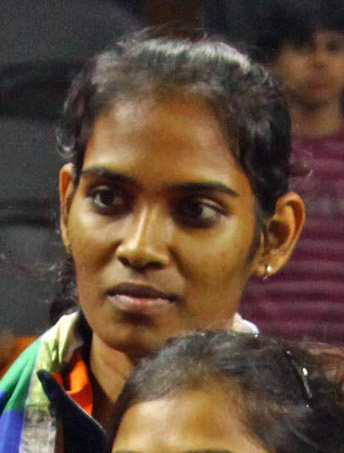
- Shamini in 2010

Personal information
- Born: 20 February 1988 (age 38) Tamil Nadu, India
- Height: 5.6 ft 0 in (171 cm)
- Weight: 56 kg (123 lb; 8 st 11 lb)
- Spouse: Nitin Thiruvengadam
Medal record
Women's table tennis
Representing India
Commonwealth Games
Silver medal – second place	2010 Delhi	Women's team
South Asian Games
Gold medal – first place	2016 Guwahati/Shillong	Women's team
Silver medal – second place	2016 Guwahati/Shillong	Women's doubles

Shamini Kumaresan (Tamil: ஷாமினி குமரேசன்; born 1988) is a professional table tennis player from Tamil Nadu, India. She did her schooling from Atomic Energy Central School Kalpakkam and Adarsh Vidyalaya, Chennai. She led the women's team which won the silver in the 19th Commonwealth table tennis championship held at Delhi in 2010. She is currently playing in the Bundesliga of Germany for the club TuS Bad Driburg.

== See also ==
- Poulomi Ghatak
- Mouma Das
