= Guyana at the 2010 Commonwealth Games =

- CGF code: GUY
- CGA: Guyana Olympic Association

in Delhi, India
- Competitors: 34 in 0 sports
- Medals: Gold 0 Silver 1 Bronze 0 Total 1

Commonwealth Games appearances (overview)
- 1930; 1934; 1938; 1950; 1954; 1958; 1962; 1966; 1970; 1974; 1978; 1982; 1986; 1990; 1994; 1998; 2002; 2006; 2010; 2014; 2018; 2022; 2026; 2030

Guyana competed in the 2010 Commonwealth Games, held in Delhi, India, from 3 to 14 October 2010. It sent 34 players, and won one silver medal, won by Aliann Pompey in the 400-meter run.

== Medalists ==
Medal	Name	Sport	Event	Date
Silver	Aliann Pompey	Athletics	Women's 400m	October 8

== Boxing ==
Men

Athlete	Event	Round of 32	Round of 16	Quarterfinals	Semifinals	Final	
Athlete	Event	Opposition Result	Opposition Result	Opposition Result	Opposition Result	Opposition Result	Rank
Clevon Rock	Lightweight	Stalker; L 1–8	did not advance				
Devon Boatswain	Middleweight	Afaese Fata; L 1–8	did not advance				

== Rugby sevens ==
Team	Pld	W	D	L	PF	PA	PD	Pts
New Zealand	3	3	0	0	141	7	+134	9
Scotland	3	2	0	1	45	63	−18	7
Canada	3	1	0	2	71	62	9	5
Guyana	3	0	0	3	0	125	−125	3

11 October 2010
10:06

Scotland	26–0	Guyana

Delhi University, New Delhi

11 October 2010
12:50

New Zealand	52–0	Guyana

Delhi University, New Delhi

11 October 2010
15:54

Canada	47–0	Guyana

Delhi University, New Delhi

== Swimming ==
Women

Athlete	Event	Heat		Final	
Athlete	Event	Time	Rank	Time	Rank
Jessica Stephenson	200 m breaststroke	02:49.56	5	did not advance	

== Squash ==
Individual

Athlete	Event	Round of 64	Round of 32	Round of 16	Quarterfinals	Semifinals	Final	Rank
Athlete	Event	Opposition Score	Opposition Score	Opposition Score	Opposition Score	Opposition Score	Opposition Score	Rank
Ashley Khalil	Women's singles	Frania Gillen-Buchert (SCO); L 0–3	did not advance					
Ashley Khalil	Women's singles	Khaaliga Nimji (KEN); W 3–0	Donna Urquhart (AUS); L 0–3	did not advance				

== See also ==
- 2010 Commonwealth Games
