= Seychelles at the 2010 Commonwealth Games =

Sporting event delegation

Seychelles competed in the 2010 Commonwealth Games held in Delhi, India, from 3 to 14 October 2010.

== Medals ==
	(gold)	(silver)	(bronze)	Total
Seychelles	0	1	0	1

== Medalist ==
Medal	Name	Sport	Event	Date
Silver	Janet Marie Georges	Weightlifting	Women's 69kg	October 8

== See also ==
- 2010 Commonwealth Games
