= Ghana at the 2010 Commonwealth Games =

Sporting event delegation

- CGF code: GHA
- CGA: Ghana Olympic Committee

in Delhi, India
- Flag bearers: Opening: Closing:
- Medals Ranked 26th: Gold 0 Silver 1 Bronze 3 Total 4

Commonwealth Games appearances (overview)
- 1954; 1958; 1962; 1966; 1970; 1974; 1978; 1982; 1986; 1990; 1994; 1998; 2002; 2006; 2010; 2014; 2018; 2022; 2026; 2030

Ghana was represented at the 2010 Commonwealth Games held in Delhi, India, from 3 to 14 October 2010. It sent 64 sportsmen and women.

== Medals ==
	(gold)	(silver)	(bronze)	Total
Ghana	0	1	3	4

== Medalist ==
Medal	Name	Sport	Event
Silver	Rosina Amenebede, Elizabeth Amolofo, Beatrice Gyaman and Janet Amponsah	Athletics	Women's 4 x 100 metres relay
Bronze	Anita Fordjour	Athletics	Women's 1500 metres (T54)
Bronze	Ignisious Gaisah	Athletics	Men's long jump
Bronze	Awusone Yekeni	Boxing	Heavyweight (91 kg)
