= Mauritius at the 2010 Commonwealth Games =

- CG code: MRI
- CGA: Mauritius Olympic Committee

in Delhi, India
- Competitors: 55 in 7 sports
- Flag bearer: Opening: Closing:
- Medals: Gold 0 Silver 0 Bronze 2 Total 2

Commonwealth Games appearances (overview)
- 1958; 1962; 1966; 1970; 1974; 1978; 1982; 1986; 1990; 1994; 1998; 2002; 2006; 2010; 2014; 2018; 2022; 2026; 2030

Mauritius competed in the 2010 Commonwealth Games held in Delhi, India, from 3 to 14 October 2010.

== Medals ==
	(gold)	(silver)	(bronze)	Total
Mauritius	0	0	2	2

== Medalists ==
Medal	Name	Sport	Event
Bronze	Louis Julie	Boxing	Bantamweight(56 kg)
Bronze	Louis Colin	Boxing	Light welterweight(64 kg)

== Athletics ==
Wednesday 6 October. 100m Men's Round 1 Heat 1. Jean Baptiste Joel Brasse: 7th 10.710s

Wednesday 6 October. 100m Men's Round 1 Heat 5. Ahmed Ondimba Bongo: Disqualified due to false start

Thursday 7 October. 100m Women – Semifinal 1. Mary Jane Vincent. Lane 8. Disqualified due to false start.

Thursday 7 October. Men's Decathlon 100m – Heat 1. Patrick Guillaume Lloyd Thierry: 7th 734 points

Thursday 7 October. Men's Decathlon Shot Put. Patrick Guillaume Lloyd Thierry: 9th 693 points

Thursday 7 October. Men's Decathlon 400m – Heat 1. Patrick Guillaume Lloyd Thierry: 7th 729 points

Thursday 7 October. Men's 400m – Heat 6. Jean Fernando Augustin: 5th 48.430s

Thursday 7 October. Men's 400m – Heat 3. Jean Francois Degrace: 4th 47.210s

== Boxing ==
Tuesday 5 October. Light Welterweight 64 kg. Bout 15 – Preliminary: Louis Colin (Mri) bt Chris Jenkins (Wal)

Tuesday 5 October. Flyweight 52 kg. Bout 3 – Preliminary: Gilbert Bactora (Mri) bt Samarasekara Dissanayake (Sri)

Wednesday 6 October. Light Weight (60 kg) Men's Qualification Bout 42 – Qualification Round: Alex Rynn (Can) bt Jean Colin (Mri)

Wednesday 6 October. Welter Weight (69 kg) Men's Qualification Bout 46 – Qualification Round: Joseph St Pierre (Mri) bt Freddie Evans (Wal)

Thursday 7 October. Men's Light Fly 46–49 kg Bout 62 – Preliminary: Jason Lavigilante (Mri) bt Christopher Katanga (Zam)

== Swimming ==
Monday 4 October. 200m Freestyle – Heat 1. Olivia De Maroussem: 2nd 02:20.320

Tuesday 5 October. 100m Freestyle – Heat 3. Olivia De Maroussem: 6th 01:03.100

Tuesday 5 October. 50m Butterfly – Heat 3. Jean Gregoire: 8th 28.480

Wednesday 6 October. 100m Freestyle Heat 3 – Qualification Round. Jean Gregoire: 8th 56.940

Thursday 7 October. 50m Freestyle – Heat 4. Olivia De Maroussem: 8th 28.540s

== Tennis ==
Tuesday 5 October. Women's Singles 7 – 1st rd: Sohinee Ghosh (Mri) bt Stacey Roheman (Lca)

Tuesday 5 October. Men's Singles 10 – 1st rd: Harshana Godamanna (Sri) bt Kamil Patel (Mri)

Wednesday 6 October. Women's Singles – 2nd rd: Anna Smith (Eng) bt Sohinee Ghosh (Mri)

== Weightlifting ==
Monday 4 October. 56 kg – Final. Marc Coret: 8th 210 points

== See also ==
- 2010 Commonwealth Games
