= Gymnastics at the 2010 Commonwealth Games =

- Venue: Indira Gandhi Arena
- Location: Delhi, India
- Dates: 4 to 8 October 2010

Gymnastics at the 2010 Commonwealth Games was the seventh appearance of Gymnastics at the Commonwealth Games. The gymnastics events were held at Indira Gandhi Arena.

== Artistic ==
Artistic gymnastics was held from .

Qualification

Men's Events

Event	Gold	Silver	Bronze
Team all-around	Australia; Samuel Offord; Joshua Jefferis; Thomas Pichler; Luke Wiwatowski; Prashanth Sellathurai	England; Max Whitlock; Luke Folwell; Danny Lawrence; Reiss Beckford; Steve Jehu	Canada; Jason Scott; Robert Watson; Tariq Dowers; Anderson Loran; Ian Galvan
Individual all-around	Luke Folwell; England	Reiss Beckford; England	Joshua Jefferis; Australia
Floor	Thomas Pichler; Australia	Reiss Beckford; England	Ashish Kumar; India
Pommel horse	Prashanth Sellathurai; Australia	Max Whitlock; England	Jonathan Chan Thuang Tong; Singapore
Rings	Samuel Offord; Australia	Luke Folwell; England	Herodotos Giorgallas; Cyprus
Vault	Luke Folwell; England	Ashish Kumar; India	Ian Galvan; Canada
Parallel bars	Joshua Jefferis; Australia	Luke Folwell; England	Prashanth Sellathurai; Australia
Horizontal bar	Dimitris Krasias; Cyprus	Anderson Loran; Canada	Max Whitlock; England

Qualification

Women's Events

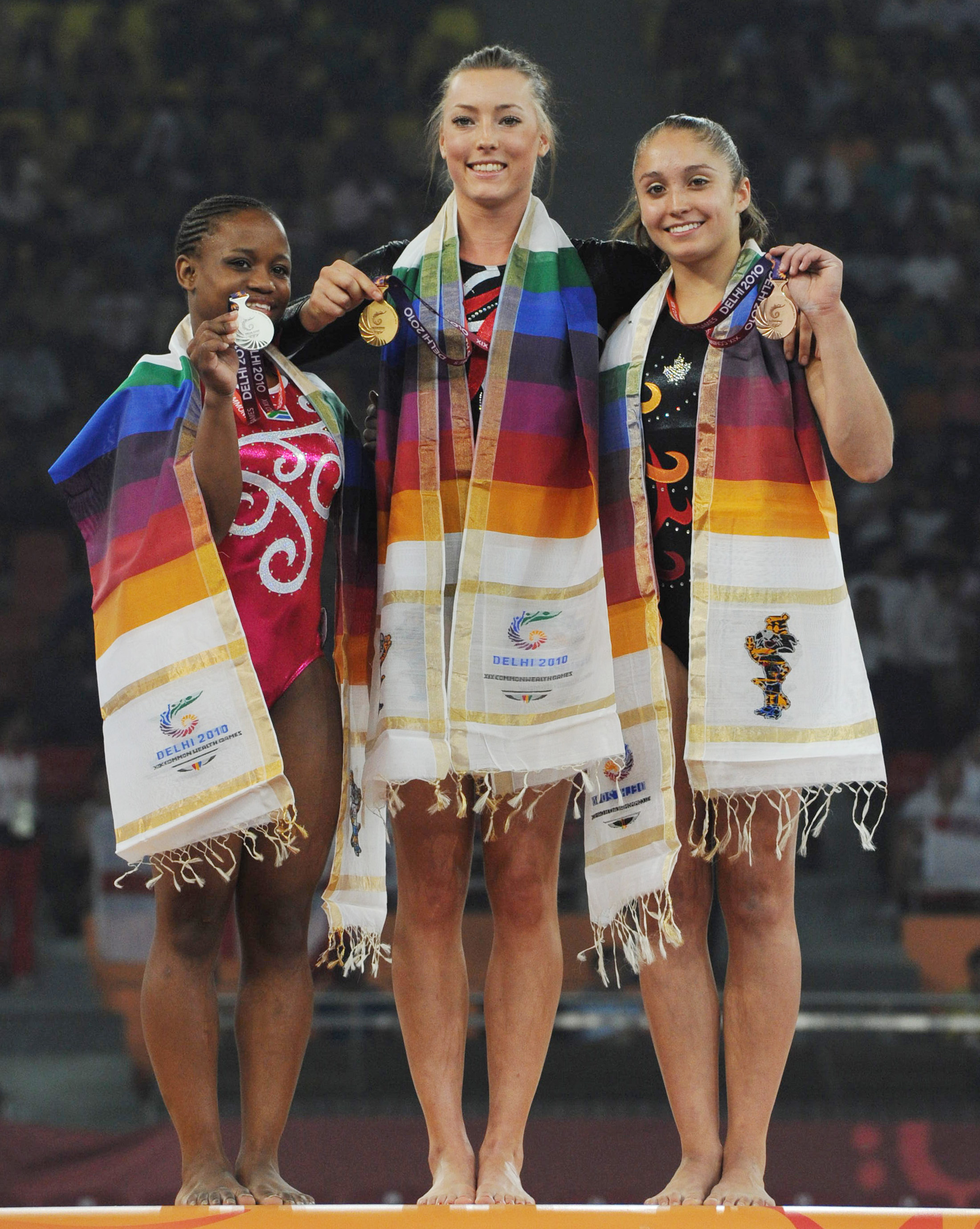
XIX Commonwealth Games-2010 Delhi Winners of Women’s Gymnastics Vault, Imogen Cairns of England (Gold), Jennifer Khwela of South Africa (Silver) and Gabby May of Canada (Bronze)

Event	Gold	Silver	Bronze
Team all-around	Australia; Emily Little; Ashleigh Brennan; Georgia Bonora; Lauren Mitchell; Georgia Wheeler	England; Charlotte Lindsley; Laura Edwards; Jocelyn Hunt; Imogen Cairns; Becky Wing	Canada; Gabby May; Cynthia Lemieux-Guillemette; Kristin Klarenbach; Emma Willis; Catherine Dion
Individual all-around	Lauren Mitchell; Australia	Emily Little; Australia	Georgia Bonora; Australia
Vault	Imogen Cairns; England	Jennifer Khwela; South Africa	Gabby May; Canada
Uneven bars	Lauren Mitchell; Australia	Georgia Bonora; Australia	Cynthia Lemieux-Guillemette; Canada
Balance beam	Lauren Mitchell; Australia	Lim Heem Wei; Singapore	Cynthia Lemieux-Guillemette; Canada
Floor	Imogen Cairns; England	Lauren Mitchell; Australia	Ashleigh Brennan; Australia

== Rhythmic ==
Rhythmic gymnastics was held from 12–14 October 2010.

Event	Gold	Silver	Bronze
Team all-around	Australia Naazmi Johnston; Janine Murray; Danielle Prince	Canada Mariam Chamilova; Demetra Mantcheva; Alexandra Martincek	England Rachel Ennis; Francesca Fox; Lynne Hutchison
Individual all-around	Naazmi Johnston; Australia	Chrystalleni Trikomiti; Cyprus	Elaine Koon; Malaysia
Ball	Naazmi Johnston; Australia	Elaine Koon; Malaysia	Chrystalleni Trikomiti; Cyprus
Hoop	Elaine Koon; Malaysia	Francesca Jones; Wales	Chrystalleni Trikomiti; Cyprus
Ribbon	Chrystalleni Trikomiti; Cyprus	Naazmi Johnston; Australia	Elaine Koon; Malaysia
Rope	Chrystalleni Trikomiti; Cyprus	Naazmi Johnston; Australia	Elaine Koon; Malaysia

== Overall medal table ==
* Host nation (India)

Rank	Nation	Gold	Silver	Bronze	Total
1	Australia	12	5	4	21
2	England	4	7	2	13
3	Cyprus	3	1	3	7
4	Malaysia	1	1	3	5
5	Canada	0	2	6	8
6	India*	0	1	1	2
6	Singapore	0	1	1	2
8	South Africa	0	1	0	1
8	Wales	0	1	0	1
Totals (9 entries)		20	20	20	60

== Participating nations ==
- Australia (13)
- Canada (13)
- Cyprus (8)
- England (13)
- Gibraltar (2)
- India (13)
- Isle of Man (3)
- Malaysia (12)
- Namibia (1)
- Northern Ireland (3)
- New Zealand (11)
- Scotland (5)
- Singapore (6)
- South Africa (8)
- Sri Lanka (5)
- Trinidad and Tobago (1)
- Wales (6)
