= England at the 2010 Commonwealth Games (B–R) =

- CG code: ENG
- CGA: Commonwealth Games England
- Website: weareengland.org

in Delhi, India
- Competitors: 364 in 17 sports
- Flag bearers: Opening: Nathan Robertson; Closing: Nicky Hunt
- Medals Ranked 3rd: Gold 37 Silver 60 Bronze 45 Total 142

Commonwealth Games appearances (overview)
- 1930; 1934; 1938; 1950; 1954; 1958; 1962; 1966; 1970; 1974; 1978; 1982; 1986; 1990; 1994; 1998; 2002; 2006; 2010; 2014; 2018; 2022; 2026; 2030

England was represented at the 2010 Commonwealth Games by Commonwealth Games England. The country went by the abbreviation ENG, will use the Cross of St George as its flag and "Jerusalem" as its victory anthem. It had previously used "Land of Hope and Glory" as its anthem at the Commonwealth Games, but decided to change following an "internet poll".

England's delegation is notable for including two Paralympic champions, who qualified to compete in Delhi against fully able-bodied athletes: Danielle Brown, who won a gold medal in archery at the 2008 Summer Paralympics, and Sarah Storey, who won two gold medals in cycling in 2008. They are the first English athletes with disabilities ever to compete in able-bodied events at the Commonwealth Games.

== England 2010 ==
Key
Qualifiers / Medal Winners
Top 8 Finish (Non Medal Winners)
Non-Qualifiers / Non Top 8 Finish

== Badminton ==
Team England consists of 10 badminton players over 6 events. The competition draw for singles and doubles events was announced on 2 October 2010.

Men's Singles

Player(s)	Round of 64	Round of 32	Round of 16	Quarter Final	Semi Final	Final	Rank
Player(s)	Opposition Result	Opposition Result	Opposition Result	Opposition Result	Opposition Result	Opposition Result	Rank
Rajiv Ouseph (2)	BYE	(Nigeria) Abah (NGR); W 21–8 21–10	(Sri Lanka) Karunaratne (SRI); W 21–5 12–21 21–15	(Singapore) Wong (SIN) (7); W 21–13 21–15	(India) Parupalli (IND) (6); W 19–21 21–12 21–18	(Malaysia) Lee (MAS) (1); L 10-21 8-21	Silver
Carl Baxter (5)	(Uganda) Tukire (UGA); W 21–5 21–11	(Nigeria) Ocholi (NGR); W 21–13 21–14	(Jamaica) Henry (JAM); W 21–11 21–14	(India) Anand (IND) (3); L 17–21 9–21	-	-	-

Women's Singles

Player(s)	Round of 64	Round of 32	Round of 16	Quarter Final	Semi Final	Final	Rank
Player(s)	Opposition Result	Opposition Result	Opposition Result	Opposition Result	Opposition Result	Opposition Result	Rank
Elizabeth Cann (4)	BYE	(Sri Lanka) Jayasinghe (SRI); W 21–13 21–12	(New Zealand) Rankin (NZL); W 21–14 21–13	(Canada) Li (CAN); W 21–14 19–21 21–16	(Malaysia) Wong (MAS) (2); L 21–21 21–18 17–21	Bronze Final (Scotland) Egelstaff (SCO) (3); W 21-18 21-16	Bronze

Men's Doubles

Player(s)	Round of 32	Round of 16	Quarter Final	Semi Final	Final	Rank
Player(s)	Opposition Result	Opposition Result	Opposition Result	Opposition Result	Opposition Result	Rank
Anthony Clark & Nathan Robertson (2)	(Zambia) Mambwe & Muwowo (ZAM); W 21–8 21–12	(Canada) Ng & Vandervet (CAN); W 21–7 21–12	(Malaysia) Chan & Hashim (MAS); W 21–8 21–7	(Singapore) Triyachart & Wong (SIN); W 21–10 17–21 21–14	(Malaysia) Koo & Tan (MAS)L 19–21 14–21	Silver

Women's Doubles

Player(s)	Round of 32	Round of 16	Quarter Final	Semi Final	Final	Rank
Player(s)	Opposition Result	Opposition Result	Opposition Result	Opposition Result	Opposition Result	Rank
Jenny Wallwork & Gabrielle White (3)	(Uganda) Bangi & Nankabirwa (UGA); W 21–7 21–10	(Canada) Gao & Ko (CAN); W 21–12 21–15	(Malaysia) Cheah & Goh (MAS); W 21–15 16–21 21–13	(Singapore) Sari & Yao (SIN) (1); L 19–21 13–21	Bronze Final (Australia) Tang & Wilson-Smith (AUS); L 23-21 12-21 16-21	4
Mariana Agathangelou & Heather Olver	(Mauritius) Foo Kune & Foo Kune (MRI); W 21–6 21–9	(Sri Lanka) Dahanayake & Jayasinghe (SRI); W 21–7 21–6	(India) Gutta & Ponnappa (IND); L 9–21 14–21	-	-	-

Mixed Doubles

Player(s)	Round of 32	Round of 16	Quarter Final	Semi Final	Final	Rank
Player(s)	Opposition Result	Opposition Result	Opposition Result	Opposition Result	Opposition Result	Rank
Nathan Robertson & Jenny Wallwork (1)	(Seychelles) Cupidon & Ah-Wan (SEY); W 21–5 21–7	(Singapore) Wijaya & Sari (SIN); W 21–19 21–17	(Scotland) Briggs & Bankier (SCO); W 22–20 23–21	(Malaysia) Chan & Goh (MAS); W 19–21 21–13 23–21	(Malaysia) Koo & Chin (MAS)	-
Anthony Clark & Heather Olver (5)	(Scotland) Van Rietvelde & Cooper (SCO); W 21–11 21–18	(Northern Ireland) Gleave & Chambers (NIR); W 21–5 21–4	(Singapore) Triyachart & Yao (SIN); L 21–19 8–21 12–21	-	-	-
Chris Adcock & Gabrielle White (7)	(Singapore) Saputra & Neo (SIN); W 21–17 21–17	(India) Thomas & Balan (IND); W 21–15 21–18	(Malaysia) Chan & Goh (MAS); L 20–22 21–16 11–21	-	-	-

Mixed Team Event

Chris Adcock, Carl Baxter, Anthony Clark, Rajiv Ouseph, Nathan Robertson, Mariana Agathangelou, Elizabeth Cann, Heather Olver, Jenny Wallwork, Gabrielle White.

	Pool Game 1	Pool Game 2	Pool Game 3	Pool Game 4	Quarter Final	Semi Final	Final	Rank
	Opposition Result	Opposition Result	Opposition Result	Opposition Result	Opposition Result	Opposition Result	Opposition Result	Rank
Opponents	Falkland Islands	Uganda	Mauritius	Canada	Scotland	India	Bronze Match: Singapore	Bronze
Men's Singles	(England) Baxter v (Falkland Islands) Brownlee; W 21–3 21–7	(England) Ouseph v (Uganda) Ekiring; W 21–10 21–9	(England) Ouseph v (Mauritius) Edoo; W 21–9 21–9	(England) Baxter v (Canada) Pang; W 21–18 21–11	(England) Ouseph v (Scotland) Merrilees; W 21–9 21–18	(England) Ouseph v (India) Parupalli; L 13–21 17–21	(England) Ouseph v (Singapore) Wong; W 21–15 21–17	Bronze
Women's Singles	(England) Cann v (Falkland Islands) Minto; W 21–2 21–3	(England) Cann v (Uganda) Nankabirwa; W 21–11 21–7	(England) Cann v (Mauritius) Foo Kune; W 21–7 21–6	(England) Cann v (Canada) Rice; L 12–21 19–21	(England) Cann v (Scotland) Egelstaff; L 12–21 17–21	(England) Cann v (India) Nehwal; L 18–21 11–21	(England) Cann v (Singapore) Xing; L 14–21 12–21	Bronze
Men's Doubles	(England) Clark/Adcock v (Falkland Islands) Clark/Brownlee; W 21–3 21–7	(England) Robertson/Clark v (Uganda) Tukire/Ssuuna; W 21–10 21–8	(England) Clark/Adcock v (Mauritius) Ramrakha/Edoo; W 21–11 21–12	(England) Clark/Adcock v (Canada) Vandervet/Ng; W 21–11 21–14	(England) Clark/Adcock v (Scotland) Van Rietvelde/Briggs; W 21–13 21–19	-	(England) Robertson/Clark v (Singapore) Triyachart/Wijaya; W 21–12 21–11	Bronze
Women's Doubles	(England) Olver/Agathangelou v (Falkland Islands) Luxton/Arkhipkina; W 21–2 21–4	(England) Wallwork/White v (Uganda) Bangi/Nankabirwa; W 21–2 21–4	(England) Olver/Agathangelou v (Mauritius) Foo Kune/Louison; W 21–5 21–6	(England) Olver/Agathangelou v (Canada) Li/Bruce; W 21–14 21–14	-	-	-	Bronze
Mixed Doubles	(England) Adcock/White v (Falkland Islands) Clark/Luxton; W 21–6 21–7	(England) Robertson/Wallwork v (Uganda) Wogute/Najjuka; W 21–10 21–7	(England) Adcock/White v (Mauritius) Beeharry/Aboobakar; W 21–9 21–10	(England) Robertson/Wallwork v (Canada) Ng/Gao; W 21–18 21–23 21–13	(England) Robertson/Wallwork v (Scotland) Briggs/Bankier; W 21–14 15–21 21–7	(England) Robertson/Wallwork v (India) Gutta/Diju; W 17–21 17–21	(England) Robertson/Wallwork v (Singapore) Triyachart/Yao; W 13–21 15–21	Bronze
Result	W 5–0	W 5–0	W 5–0	W 4–1	W 3–1	L 0–3	W 3–1	Bronze

== Boxing ==
Team England consists of 9 boxers over 9 events. On 30 September 2010 it was announced that Khalid Yafai was withdrawing due to a shoulder injury and that Tommy Stubbs would move up a weight to replace him.

Men

Event	Boxer	Round of 32	Round of 16	Quarter Finals	Semi Finals	Final	Rank
Event	Boxer	Opposition Result	Opposition Result	Opposition Result	Opposition Result	Opposition Result	Rank
Flyweight 52 kg	Tommy Stubbs	BYE	(Wales) Selby (WAL); L PTS 1-1+	-	-	-	-
Bantamweight 56 kg	Iain Weaver	(Eswatini) Simelane (SWZ); W RSCH R2	(India) Kumar (IND); L PTS 6–11	-	-	-	-
Lightweight 60 kg	Tom Stalker	(Guyana) Rock (GUY); W PTS 8–1	(Sri Lanka) Sameera (SRI); W PTS 4–0	(Australia) Jackson (AUS); W PTS 7–2	(India) Bhagwan (IND); W PTS 10–5	(Scotland) Taylor (SCO); W PTS 11–3	Gold
Light Welterweight 64 kg	Bradley Saunders	(Grenada) Boatswain (GRN); W RSCH R1	(New Zealand) Taylor (NZL); W PTS 10–0	(Canada) Ulysse (CAN); W PTS 11–4	(Mauritius) Colin (MRI); W PTS 10–7	(India) Kumar (IND); W 11-2	Gold
Welterweight 69 kg	Callum Smith	(Kiribati) Betero (KIR); W PTS 5–0	(Australia) Hammond (AUS); W PTS 4–2	(Scotland) Brown (SCO); W PTS 4–0	(The Bahamas) Hield (BAH); W PTS 4–3	(Northern Ireland) Gallagher (NIR); L PTS 6–11	Silver
Middleweight 75 kg	Anthony Ogogo	(Kiribati) Kometa (KIR); W RSC R2	(Australia) Hooper (AUS); W PTS +3-3	(Nigeria) Lukmon (NGR); W PTS 10–0	(India) Singh (IND); W PTS 4–3	(Northern Ireland) O'Kane (NIR); L 4-16	Silver
Light Heavyweight 81 kg	Obed Mbwakongo	BYE	(India) Kumar (IND); W PTS 9–8	(Scotland) Johnson (SCO); L PTS 2–6	-	-	-
Heavyweight 91 kg	Simon Vallily	BYE	(Isle of Man) Winrow (IOM); W KO R1	(Cameroon) Fokou (CMR); W RSCH R3	(Ghana) Yekeni (GHA); W W/O	(Northern Ireland) Ward (NIR); W RSCH R1	Gold
Super Heavyweight +91 kg	Amin Isa	BYE	(Tonga) Fa (TGA); L PTS 5–8	-	-	-	-

== Cycling ==
Team England consists of 18 cyclists over 18 events

On 23 September 2010, it was announced that Ian Stannard and Ben Swift were withdrawing due to health concerns (specifically around the dengue fever outbreak in Delhi).

On 25 September 2010, it was announced that Russell Downing was withdrawing from the road cycling team

=== Road ===
Men

Event	Cyclist(s)	Time	Rank
40 km Time Trial	Alex Dowsett	48:13.48	Silver
40 km Time Trial	Chris Froome	49:38.83	5
167 km Road Race	Alex Dowsett	3:54:08	14
167 km Road Race	Erick Rowsell	3:57:10	38
167 km Road Race	Chris Froome	3:57:10	44
167 km Road Race	Simon Yates	3:57:14	45

Women

Event	Cyclist(s)	Time	Rank
29 km Time Trial	Julia Shaw	39:09.52	Bronze
29 km Time Trial	Emma Trott	40:19.52	8
29 km Time Trial	Emma Pooley	40:25.22	9
100 km Road Race	Lizzie Armitstead	2:49:30	Silver
100 km Road Race	Lucy Martin	2:49:30	14
100 km Road Race	Katie Colclough	2:49:30	16
100 km Road Race	Sharon Laws	2:49:45	28
100 km Road Race	Emma Trott	2:50:17	33
100 km Road Race	Emma Pooley	2:50:19	34

=== Track ===
Men

Event	Cyclist(s)	Qualifying		Round 1	Repechage	Round 2	Semi Final	Final	Rank
Event	Cyclist(s)	Time	Rank	Opposition Result	Opposition Result	Opposition Result	Opposition Result	Opposition Result	Rank
Individual Sprint	David Daniell	10.459	9 Q	(Scotland) Paul ?-?	?	(Australia) Sunderland; L 0–2	-	5th–8th Place; 8th Place	8
Individual Sprint	Peter Mitchell	10.542	11 Q	(Malaysia) Md Yunos ?-?	Wed 6 Oct	Thu 7 Oct	Thu 7 Oct	Thu 7 Oct	-
Individual Pursuit	George Atkins	4:34.490	8					DNQ	8
Individual Pursuit	Erick Rowsell	4:39.710	10					DNQ	10
Kieren	David Daniell			1st in Heat 3 Q	BYE	3rd in Heat 1 Q		2nd in Final	Silver
Kieren	Peter Mitchell			6th in Heat 2	1st in Heat 2 Q	3rd in Heat 2 Q		5th in Final	5
Scratch Race	George Atkins	9th in Heat 2	9 Q					DNF	-
Scratch Race	Simon Yates	10th in Heat 2	10 Q					DNF	-
Scratch Race	Erick Rowsell	15th in Heat 1	15					-	-
Points Race	George Atkins	5 pts	9 Q					52 pts	Silver
Points Race	Erick Rowsell	1 pt	11 Q					1 pt	13
Points Race	Simon Yates	6 pts	7 Q					-15 pts	16

Women

Event	Cyclist(s)	Qualifying		Round 1	Repechage	Semi Final	Final	Rank
Event	Cyclist(s)	Time	Rank	Opposition Result	Opposition Result	Opposition Result	Opposition Result	Rank
Time Trial	Anna Blyth						48.903	7
Individual Pursuit	Sarah Storey	3:39.964	6				DNQ	6
Individual Pursuit	Laura Trott	3:40.329	7				DNQ	7
Individual Pursuit	Anna Blyth	3:51.252	10				DNQ	10
Scratch Race	Anna Blyth						3rd in Final	Bronze
Scratch Race	Laura Trott						9th in Final	9
Scratch Race	Lucy Martin						11th in Final	11
Points Race	Katie Colclough						24 pts	4
Points Race	Laura Trott						5 pts	9
Points Race	Lucy Martin						1 pt	12

== Gymnastics ==
Team England consists of 13 gymnasts over 20 events

=== Artistic ===
Men

Event	Gymnast(s)	Qualification		Final	
Event	Gymnast(s)	Points	Rank	Points	Rank
Team Competition	Team England			256.750	Silver
Individual All-Round	Luke Folwell	84.350	3 Q	85.550	Gold
Individual All-Round	Reiss Beckford	84.550	2 Q	85.450	Silver
Individual All-Round	Max Whitlock	84.300	5 Q	84.450	4
Individual All-Round	Danny Lawrence	42.850	42	DNQ	42
Individual All-Round	Steve Jehu	39.800	44	DNQ	44
Floor	Reiss Beckford	14.350	5 Q	14.625	Silver
Floor	Steve Jehu	14.500	3 Q	14.250	4
Floor	Luke Folwell	13.950	10	DNQ	10
Floor	Max Whitlock	13.400	18	DNQ	18
Horizontal Bar	Max Whitlock	13.700	8 Q	13.575	Bronze
Horizontal Bar	Reiss Beckford	14.000	3 Q	13.475	5
Horizontal Bar	Danny Lawrence	13.600	9	DNQ	9
Horizontal Bar	Luke Folwell	12.650	21	DNQ	21
Parallel Bars	Luke Folwell	14.250	3 Q	14.200	Silver
Parallel Bars	Reiss Beckford	14.400	2 Q	13.550	5
Parallel Bars	Danny Lawrence	13.800	7	DNQ	10
Parallel Bars	Max Whitlock	13.300	21	DNQ	21
Pommel Horse	Max Whitlock	15.300	1 Q	15.125	Silver
Pommel Horse	Luke Folwell	13.700	6 Q	13.300	5
Pommel Horse	Reiss Beckford	12.400	18	DNQ	18
Pommel Horse	Steve Jehu	11.150	35	DNQ	35
Rings	Luke Folwell	14.550	5 Q	14.750	Silver
Rings	Reiss Beckford	14.200	7 Q	14.200	4
Rings	Steve Jehu	14.150	10	DNQ	10
Rings	Max Whitlock	13.850	15	DNQ	15
Vault	Luke Folwell	15.400	2 Q	15.762	Gold
Vault	Reiss Beckford	15.350	3 Q	15.000	4
Vault	Danny Lawrence	14.750	8	DNQ	9

Women

Event	Gymnast(s)	Qualification		Final	
Event	Gymnast(s)	Points	Rank	Points	Rank
Team Competition	Team England			158.200	Silver
Individual All-Round	Imogen Cairns	53.500	3 Q	54.650	4
Individual All-Round	Jocelyn Hunt	52.300	4 Q	53.600	5
Individual All-Round	Laura Edwards	51.150	7 Q	52.900	6
Individual All-Round	Charlotte Lindsley	48.800	11	DNQ	25
Beam	Laura Edwards	13.200	3 Q	12.750	4
Beam	Imogen Cairns	13.200	2 Q	11.950	8
Beam	Jocelyn Hunt	13.150	5	DNQ	9
Beam	Charlotte Lindsley	10.500	23	DNQ	23
Floor	Imogen Cairns	14.000	2 Q	14.200	Gold
Floor	Laura Edwards	13.050	5 Q	12.925	5
Floor	Jocelyn Hunt	12.850	9	DNQ	9
Floor	Charlotte Lindsley	12.150	12	DNQ	12
Uneven Bars	Charlotte Lindsley	12.450	9 Q	11.900	4
Uneven Bars	Jocelyn Hunt	12.500	6 Q	11.225	8
Uneven Bars	Imogen Cairns	12.300	13	DNQ	13
Uneven Bars	Laura Edwards	11.350	19	DNQ	19
Vault	Imogen Cairns	13.600	2 Q	13.775	Gold

=== Rhythmic ===
Women

Francesca Fox, Lynne Hutchison, Rachel Ennis

Event	Gymnast(s)	Qualification		Final	
Event	Gymnast(s)	Points	Rank	Points	Rank
Team Competition	Team England			220.475	Bronze
Individual All-Round	Lynne Hutchison	88.325	9 Q	Wed 13 Oct	-
Individual All-Round	Francesca Fox	86.850	13 Q	Wed 13 Oct	-
Individual All-Round	Rachel Ennis	86.375	14	DNQ	19
Ball	Rachel Ennis	21.700	11	DNQ	11
Ball	Francesca Fox	21.050	15	DNQ	15
Ball	Lynne Hutchison	20.675	16	DNQ	16
Hoop	Lynne Hutchison	23.475	6 Q	Thu 14 Oct	-
Hoop	Rachel Ennis	22.825	7 Q	Thu 14 Oct	-
Hoop	Francesca Fox	22.200	12	DNQ	12
Ribbon	Lynne Hutchison	22.725	7 Q	Thu 14 Oct	-
Ribbon	Rachel Ennis	21.450	12	DNQ	12
Ribbon	Francesca Fox	21.250	14	DNQ	14
Rope	Francesca Fox	22.350	8 Q	Thu 14 Oct	-
Rope	Lynne Hutchison	21.450	13	DNQ	13
Rope	Rachel Ennis	20.400	16	DNQ	16

== Hockey ==
Team England consists of 32 hockey players over the 2 team events.

Summary

Event	Team	Rank
Men's Team	England	4th
Women's Team	England	Bronze

Men

England Squad:
James Fair, Richard Mantell, Richard Smith, Richard Alexander, Alastair Wilson, Adam Dixon, Glenn Kirkham, Ashley Jackson, Robert Moore, Harry Martin, James Tindall, Barry Middleton, Iain Mackay, Nicholas Catlin, Alastair Brogdon, Simon Mantell.

Pool B

Team	Pld	W	D	L	GF	GA	GD	Pts
England	4	3	1	0	12	5	+7	10 Q
New Zealand	4	2	1	1	15	9	+6	7 Q
South Africa	4	2	0	2	12	10	+2	6
Canada	4	1	2	1	5	6	−1	5
Trinidad and Tobago	4	0	0	4	4	18	−14	0

6 October 2010
15:30

England	4–0	Trinidad and Tobago

7 October 2010
18:00

England	1–1	Canada

9 October 2010
08:30

England	5–3	New Zealand

10 October 2010
12:00

England	2–1	South Africa

Semi-final

12 October 2010
17:30

England	3–3 (AET) 4 – 5 (PSO)	India

Bronze Medal Match

14 October 2010
09:00

New Zealand	3–3 (AET) 3 – 5 (PSO)	England

Women

England Squad:
Ashleigh Ball, Charlotte Craddock, Crista Cullen, Alex Danson, Susie Gilbert, Hannah Macleod, Helen Richardson, Chloe Rogers, Natalie Seymour, Beth Storry, Georgie Twigg, Laura Unsworth, Kate Walsh, Sally Walton, Nicola White, Kerry Williams.

Pool B

Team	Pld	W	D	L	GF	GA	GD	Pts
New Zealand	4	4	0	0	17	3	+14	12 Q
England	4	3	0	1	12	6	+6	9 Q
Canada	4	1	0	3	6	11	−5	3
Wales	4	1	0	3	5	12	−7	3
Malaysia	4	1	0	3	4	12	−8	3

5 October 2010
08:30

England	4–1	Wales

6 October 2010
11:00

England	4–1	Canada

8 October 2010
13:30

England	1–4	New Zealand

9 October 2010
14:00

England	3–0	Malaysia

Semi-final

11 October 2010
11:00

Australia	1–0	England

Bronze Medal Match

13 October 2010
10:30

England	1–0	South Africa

== Lawn bowls ==
Team England consists of 12 lawn bowls players over 6 events

Player	Match 1	Match 2	Match 3	Match 4	Match 5	Match 6	Match 7	Match 8	Match 9	Match 10	Match 11	Quarter Final	Semi Final	Final	Rank
Men's Singles; Sam Tolchard	(Jersey); JEY; W 2–0	(Malta); MLT; W 1½–½	(Botswana); BOT; L 1–1*	(Wales); WAL; W 2–0	(Niue); NIU; W 2–0	(Brunei); BRU; W 2–0	(New Zealand); NZL; W 2–0	(Cook Islands); COK; W *1–1				BYE	(Wales); WAL; L 1–1*	Bronze (Northern Ireland); NIR; L 1–1*	4
Men's Pairs; Mervyn King & Stuart Airey	(Guernsey); GGY; L 1–1*	(Falkland Islands); FLK; W 2–0	(Malawi); MAW; W 2–0	(Samoa); SAM; W 2–0	(Wales); WAL; W 2–0	(Namibia); NAM; L 1–1*	(Jersey); JEY; W *1–1	(New Zealand); NZL; W 1½–½	(India); IND; W 2–0	(Malaysia); MAS; W *1–1	(Malta); MLT; L 0–2	(Australia); AUS; W 2–0	(Malaysia); MAS; W 2–0	(South Africa); RSA; L ½–1½	Silver
Men's Triples; Mark Bantock, Graham Shadwell & Robert Newman	(Jersey); JEY; W 2–0	(Guernsey); GGY; W *1–1	(Papua New Guinea); PNG; W 2–0	(Malaysia); MAS; W *1–1	(Botswana); BOT; W 2–0	(Kenya); KEN; W 2–0	(Norfolk Island); NFK; W 2–0	(Cook Islands); COK; W 2–0	(Northern Ireland); NIR; W 2–0			BYE	(Australia); AUS; L 1–1*	Bronze (Wales); WAL; W 2–0	Bronze
Women's Singles; Natalie Melmore	(Wales); WAL; W 2–0	(Papua New Guinea); PNG; W *1–1	(Malawi); MAW; W 2–0	(Samoa); SAM; W 2–0	(Cook Islands); COK; W 2–0	(Zambia); ZAM; L 1–1*	(Niue); NIU; W 2–0	(Australia); AUS; L 0–2	(Kenya); KEN; W *1–1			(Wales); WAL; W 1½–½	(Malaysia); MAS; W *1–1	(New Zealand); NZL; W 2–0	Gold
Women's Pairs; Ellen Falkner & Amy Monkhouse	(Jersey); JEY; W 2–0	(Wales); WAL; W 1½–½	(Guernsey); GGY; L 1–1*	(Brunei); BRU; W 2–0	(Eswatini); SWZ; W *1–1	(Samoa); SAM; W 1½–½	(Malaysia); MAS; L *1–1	(Papua New Guinea); PNG; W 2–0	(Niue); NIU; W 2–0	(Scotland); SCO; W 2–0		(Namibia); NAM; W *1–1	(Australia); AUS; W 1½–½	(Malaysia); MAS; W *1–1	Gold
Women's Triples; Jamie-Lea Winch, Sandy Hazell & Sian Gordon	(Norfolk Island); NFK; W 2–0	(Wales); WAL; W 2–0	(Canada); CAN; W *1–1	(Malaysia); MAS; L 1–1*	(Cook Islands); COK; W*1–1	(Papua New Guinea); PNG; W 2–0	(South Africa); RSA; W 2–0	(Brunei); BRU; W 2–0				BYE	(South Africa); RSA; L 1–1*	Bronze (India); IND; W 1½–½	Bronze

- indicates match winner after a tie-break

== Netball ==
Team England consists of 12 netball players

Summary

Event	Team	Rank
Women's Team	England	-

Women

Karen Atkinson, Sonia Mkoloma, Pamela Cookey, Sara Bayman, Eboni Beckford Chambers, Louisa Brownfield, Jade Clarke, Rachel Dunn, Stacey Francis, Joanne Harten, Tamsin Greenway, Geva Mentor

Pool B

Nation	Pld	W	D	L
New Zealand	5	5	0	0
England	5	4	0	1
South Africa	5	3	0	2
Barbados	5	2	0	3
Cook Islands	5	1	0	4
Papua New Guinea	5	0	0	5

4 October 2010; 15:00	England	81–20	Barbados	Thyagaraj Sports Complex

5 October 2010; 09:30	England	54–36	South Africa	Thyagaraj Sports Complex

7 October 2010; 09:30	New Zealand	47–41	England	Thyagaraj Sports Complex

8 October 2010; 17:00	England	81–33	Cook Islands	Thyagaraj Sports Complex

10 October 2010; 09:00	England	89–31	Papua New Guinea	Thyagaraj Sports Complex

Semi-final

12 October 2010; 13:00	Australia	51–45	England	Thyagaraj Sports Complex

== Rugby sevens ==
Summary

Competitor(s)	Event	Rank
England	Men's Team	4

Men

England Squad:
Greg Barden, Kevin Barrett, John Brake, Dan Caprice, Chris Cracknell, Isoa Damudamu,
Ben Gollings, Simon Hunt, Dan Norton, Tom Powell, James Rodwell, Mathew Turner.

Group D

Team	Pld	W	D	L	PF	PA	PD	Pts
England	3	3	0	0	135	26	+109	9
Australia	3	2	0	1	94	26	+68	7
Uganda	3	1	0	2	35	93	−58	5
Sri Lanka	3	0	0	3	17	136	−119	3

11 October 2010
10:28

England	59–7	Sri Lanka

Delhi University

11 October 2010
14:04

England	55–0	Uganda

Delhi University

11 October 2010
17:54

England	21–19	Australia

Delhi University

Quarter Final

12 October 2010
11:00

England	7–5	Samoa

Delhi University

Semi-final

12 October 2010
14:28

New Zealand	33–12	England

Delhi University

Bronze Medal Match

12 October 2010
16:20

England	14–17	South Africa

Delhi University

== See also ==
- England at the Commonwealth Games
- England at the 2006 Commonwealth Games
