= Gymnastics at the 2010 Commonwealth Games – Women's rhythmic individual all-around =

The Women's rhythmic individual all-around event took place on 13 October 2010 at the Indira Gandhi Arena.

== Final ==
Place	Name	Rope (rhythmic gymnastics)	Hoop (rhythmic gymnastics)	Ball (rhythmic gymnastics)	Ribbon (rhythmic gymnastics)	Total
1st place, gold medalist(s)	Naazmi Johnston (AUS)	25.275 (1)	25.550 (2)	24.675 (1)	24.600 (2)	100.100
2nd place, silver medalist(s)	Chrystalleni Trikomiti (CYP)	24.450 (2)	25.625 (1)	23.550 (3)	25.350 (1)	98.975
3rd place, bronze medalist(s)	Elaine Koon (MAS)	24.250 (3)	24.900 (3)	22.600 (6)	24.250 (3)	96.000
4	Francesca Jones (WAL)	23.050 (5)	24.000 (5)	23.700 (2)	22.650 (6)	93.400
5	Mariam Chamilova (CAN)	22.750 (7)	23.600 (6)	23.275 (4)	22.850 (5)	92.475
6	Nur Hidayah Abdul Wahid (MAS)	23.000 (6)	24.050 (4)	22.650 (5)	22.000 (8)	91.700
7	Janine Murray (AUS)	23.100 (4)	22.950 (7)	22.175 (8)	23.150 (4)	91.375
8	Sibongile Mjekula (RSA)	22.150 (8)	22.550 (8)	22.150 (9)	21.750 (9)	88.600
9	Lynne Hutchison (ENG)	22.000 (9)	22.350 (9)	22.300 (11)	22.450 (7)	88.100
10	Demetra Mantcheva (CAN)	21.650 (11)	22.350 (9)	22.250 (7)	21.150 (12)	87.400
11	Francesca Fox (ENG)	21.950 (10)	22.050 (11)	22.000 (10)	21.300 (10)	87.300
12	Mereana Rademakers (NZL)	21.300 (12)	20.600 (12)	19.500 (13)	21.250 (11)	82.700
13	Keziah Oliver (NZL)	20.750 (13)	20.450 (13)	19.750 (12)	20.900 (13)	81.850
14	Victoria Clow (SCO)	18.300 (14)	19.000 (14)	18.900 (14)	18.650 (15)	74.850
15	Georgina Cassar (GIB)	17.025 (15)	17.400 (16)	16.925 (15)	18.900 (14)	71.725
16	Pooja Shriniwas Surve (IND)	16.200 (16)	17.600 (15)	16.925 (16)	17.650 (16)	68.375
