= Gymnastics at the 2010 Commonwealth Games – Women's rhythmic individual hoop =

The Women's rhythmic individual hoop event took place on 14 October 2010 at the Indira Gandhi Arena.

== Final ==
Place	Name	Hoop (rhythmic gymnastics)
1st place, gold medalist(s)	Elaine Koon (MAS)	25.300
2nd place, silver medalist(s)	Francesca Jones (WAL)	24.750
3rd place, bronze medalist(s)	Chrystalleni Trikomiti (CYP)	24.500
4	Naazmi Johnston (AUS)	24.350
5	Nur Hidayah Abdul Wahid (MAS)	23.350
6	Mariam Chamilova (CAN)	23.000
7	Rachel Ennis (ENG)	22.850
8	Lynne Hutchison (ENG)	22.500
