= Danielle Prince =

Australian rhythmic gymnast

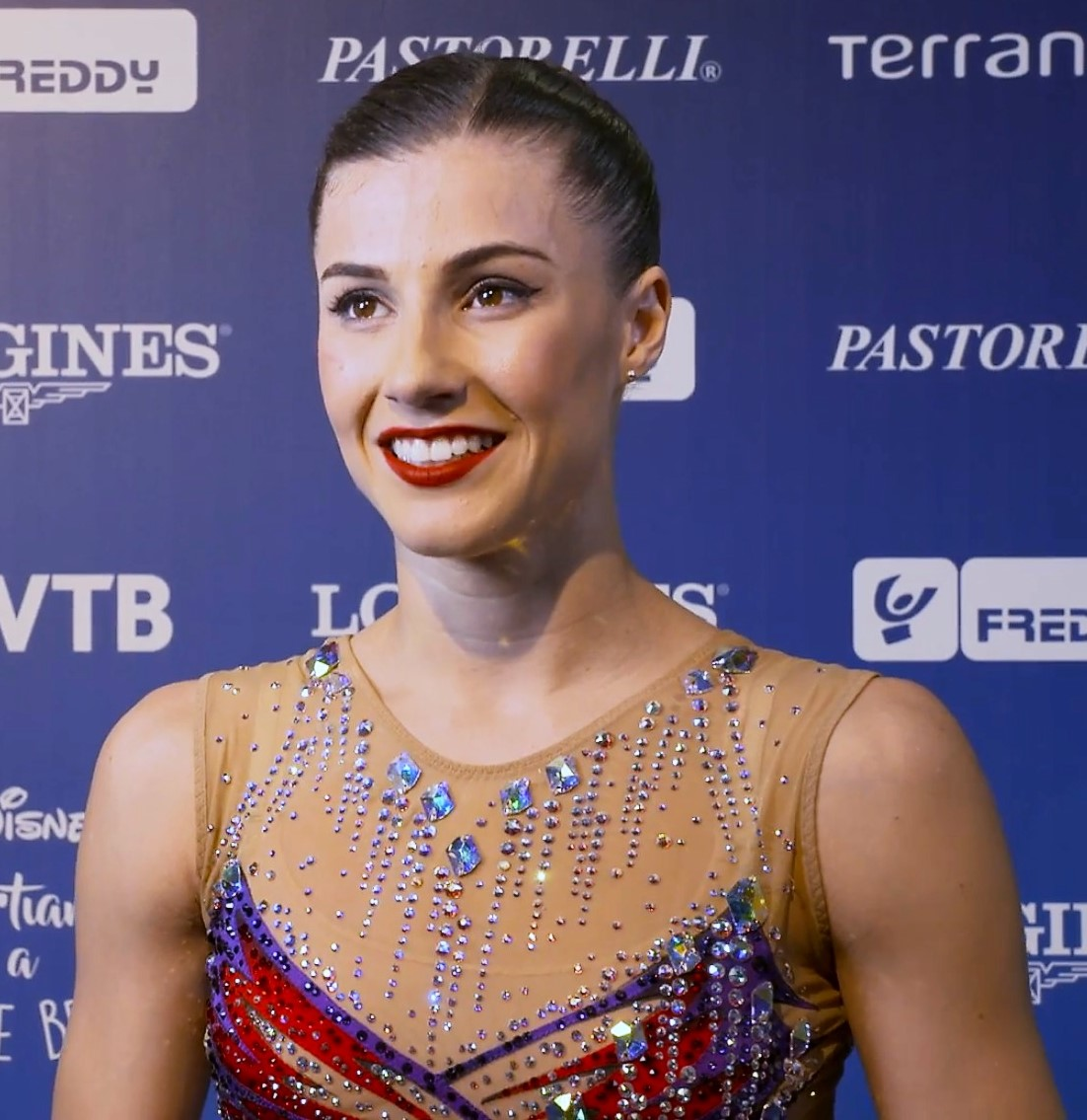
- Prince interviewed at the 35th FIG Rhythmic Gymnastics World Championships in Pesaro, Italy, 2017

Personal information
- Full name: Danielle Mia Prince
- Nickname: Danni
- Born: 12 June 1992 (age 34) Brisbane, Queensland
- Height: 166 cm (5 ft 5 in)

Gymnastics career
- Discipline: Rhythmic gymnastics
- Country represented: Australia (9)
- Club: Premier gymnastics
- Head coaches: Gina Peluso, Danielle Le Ray
- Former coach: Sam Bridges
- Retired: yes
Medal record
Rhythmic Gymnastics
Representing Australia
Commonwealth Games
Gold medal – first place	2010 Delhi	Team
Bronze medal – third place	2018 Gold Coast	Team
Pacific Rim Championships
Bronze medal – third place	2016 Everett	Ball
Bronze medal – third place	2016 Everett	Clubs
Bronze medal – third place	2016 Everett	Ribbon

Danielle Mia Prince (born 12 June 1992) is an Australian rhythmic gymnast. She is a five time Australian National All-around champion.

== Career ==
Prince has appeared in senior international competitions since 2009. She has competed in 7 World Championships (2009 in Mie, 2010 in Moscow, 2011 Montpellier 2013 in Kyiv, 2014 in İzmir, 2015 in Stuttgart), 2017 (Pesaro). Prince was member of the Australian Rhythmic Gymnastics Team (together with Janine Murray, Naazmi Johnston) that won team gold at the 2010 Commonwealth Games in Delhi, India. Making history Prince was the first Australian female gymnast to compete in three Commonwealth Games, (2010, 2014 & 2018). She has also competed in 12 Rhythmic Gymnastics World Cup.

Prince competed at the 2016 Pacific Rim Championships where she finished 6th in the all-around and won bronze medals in apparatus finals in ball, clubs and ribbon. Prince also qualified through the continental quota system for the 2016 Rio Olympics as being the highest-ranked rhythmic gymnast in the individual all-round event from the Oceania region. On 8–10 July, Prince then finished 30th in the all-around at the 2016 Kazan World Cup.

On 19–20 August, Prince competed at the 2016 Summer Olympics held in Rio de Janeiro, Brazil. She finished 24th in the rhythmic gymnastics individual all-around qualifications.

In 2017, Prince competed at the 2017 Tashkent World Cup finishing 26th in the all-around. Prince then competed at the 2017 Baku World Cup finishing 28th in the all-around. Prince competed at the quadrennial held 2017 World Games in Wrocław, Poland from 20 to 30 July. On 30 August – 3 September, Prince competed at the 2017 World Championships in Pesaro, Italy; finishing 53rd in the all-around qualifications.

Prince finished her gymnastics career at the 2018 Commonwealth Games, performing in front of a home crowd, as team captain of the Bronze Medal-winning team.
