= Gymnastics at the 2010 Commonwealth Games – Women's rhythmic individual ribbon =

Olympic Champs

The Women's rhythmic individual ribbon event took place on 14 October 2010 at the Indira Gandhi Arena.

== Final ==
Place	Name	Ribbon (rhythmic gymnastics)
1st place, gold medalist(s)	Chrystalleni Trikomiti (CYP)	25.700
2nd place, silver medalist(s)	Naazmi Johnston (AUS)	24.600
3rd place, bronze medalist(s)	Elaine Koon (MAS)	24.400
4	Mariam Chamilova (CAN)	23.900
5	Janine Murray (AUS)	23.550
6	Francesca Jones (WAL)	23.100
7	Nur Hidayah Abdul Wahid (MAS)	22.600
8	Lynne Hutchison (ENG)	22.150
