= Gymnastics at the 2010 Commonwealth Games – Women's rhythmic individual rope =

The women's rhythmic individual rope event took place on 14 October 2010, at the Indira Gandhi Arena in New Delhi, India as part of the 2010 Commonwealth Games.

== Final ==
Place	Name	Rope (rhythmic gymnastics)
1st place, gold medalist(s)	Chrystalleni Trikomiti (CYP)	25.800
2nd place, silver medalist(s)	Naazmi Johnston (AUS)	25.100
3rd place, bronze medalist(s)	Elaine Koon (MAS)	24.950
4	Francesca Jones (WAL)	23.800
5	Nur Hidayah Abdul Wahid (MAS)	23.600
6	Janine Murray (AUS)	22.900
7	Mariam Chamilova (CAN)	22.750
8	Francesca Fox (ENG)	22.150
