= Cyprus at the 2010 Commonwealth Games =

- CGF code: CYP
- CGA: Cyprus Olympic Committee
- Website: olympic.org.cy (in Greek and English)

in Delhi, India
- Competitors: 56
- Flag bearers: Opening: Closing:
- Medals Ranked 12th: Gold 4 Silver 3 Bronze 4 Total 11

Commonwealth Games appearances (overview)
- 1978; 1982; 1986; 1990; 1994; 1998; 2002; 2006; 2010; 2014; 2018; 2022; 2026; 2030

Cyprus competed in the 2010 Commonwealth Games held in Delhi, India winning 11 medals.

== Medalists ==
Medal	Name	Sport	Event	Date
Bronze	Andreas Chasikos	Shooting	Men's Skeet (Singles)	October 13
Bronze	Irodotos Georgallas	Gymnastics	Men's Rings	October 7
Bronze	Chrystalleni Trikomiti	Gymnastics	Women's rhythmic individual hoop	October 14
Bronze	Chrystalleni Trikomiti	Gymnastics	Women's rhythmic individual Ball	October 14
Silver	Marianna Zachariadi	Athletics	Women's pole vault	October 12
Silver	Georgios Achilleos	Shooting	Men's Skeet (Singles)	October 13
Silver	Chrystalleni Trikomiti	Gymnastics	Women's rhythmic individual all-around	October 13
Gold	Dimitris Krasias	Gymnastics	Men's Horizontal Bar	October 8
Gold	Georgios Achilleos and Andreas Chasikos	Shooting	Men's Skeet (Pairs)	October 11
Gold	Chrystalleni Trikomiti	Gymnastics	Women's rhythmic individual rope	October 14
Gold	Chrystalleni Trikomiti	Gymnastics	Women's rhythmic individual Ribbon	October 14

== See also ==
- 2010 Commonwealth Games
