= Gymnastics at the 2010 Commonwealth Games – Women's rhythmic individual ball =

The Women's rhythmic individual ball event took place on 14 October 2010 at the Indira Gandhi Arena.

== Final ==
Place	Name	Ball (rhythmic gymnastics)
1st place, gold medalist(s)	Naazmi Johnston (AUS)	25.100
2nd place, silver medalist(s)	Elaine Koon (MAS)	24.500
3rd place, bronze medalist(s)	Chrystalleni Trikomiti (CYP)	24.350
4	Francesca Jones (WAL)	23.950
5	Mariam Chamilova (CAN)	23.800
6	Janine Murray (AUS)	23.250
7	Nur Hidayah Abdul Wahid (MAS)	23.200
8	Alexandra Martineck (CAN)	20.200
