= Jennifer Khwela =

South African artistic gymnast (born 1992)

- Khwela at the 2010 Commonwealth Games

Personal information
- Born: February 4, 1992 (age 34) Durban, South Africa

Gymnastics career
- Discipline: Women's artistic gymnastics
- Country represented: South Africa
- Club: eThekwini Gymnastics Academy
- Head coach: Julie Adamson
- Retired: 2013
Medal record
Women's artistic gymnastics
Representing South Africa
Commonwealth Games
| Silver medal – second place | 2010 Delhi | Vault |
African Championships
| Gold medal – first place | 2010 Walvis Bay | Team |
| Gold medal – first place | 2010 Walvis Bay | Vault |
| Gold medal – first place | 2010 Walvis Bay | Floor exercise |
| Silver medal – second place | 2009 Cairo | Team |
| Silver medal – second place | 2009 Cairo | All-around |
| Silver medal – second place | 2009 Cairo | Vault |
| Silver medal – second place | 2009 Cairo | Uneven bars |
| Bronze medal – third place | 2009 Cairo | Floor exercise |
| Bronze medal – third place | 2010 Walvis Bay | All-around |
FIG World Cup
| Event | 1st | 2nd | 3rd |
|---|---|---|---|
| World Apparatus Cup | 1 | 1 | 1 |
| Total | 1 | 1 | 1 |

Jennifer Khwela (born February 4, 1992) is a South African artistic gymnast. In 2010, she achieved the highest-ever placement for a South African gymnast at the Commonwealth Games, winning silver on vault. She is also the first South African to win a gold medal at an FIG World Cup event.

== Early life ==
Khwela was born and raised in Umbilo, Durban by her mother and grandmother. Due to oxygen deprivation at birth, she was affected by learning disabilities and attended a special needs school. She became interested in gymnastics after watching the 2000 Olympics. In 2001, Khwela's potential was identified by coach Gail Adamson, and she began gymnastics at age nine. Adamson's daughter Julie began coaching Khwela shortly after, and she remained Khwela's coach for the remainder of her career.

== Gymnastics career ==
=== 2008-2009 ===
Khwela became eligible for senior competition in 2008. That year, she became the first Black woman to win the South African Gymnastics Games.

At the beginning of 2009, Khwela competed at the African Championships in Cairo. In addition to winning silver with the South African team, she won four individual medals, including silver in the all-around behind Sherine El-Zeiny of Egypt. Later that year, Khwela represented South Africa at the 2009 World Championships in London. She placed 59th in the all-around, as well as 22nd on vault.

=== 2010 ===
Khwela competed at the 2010 African Championships, where she won team gold with South Africa, as well as individual gold medals on vault and floor exercise. Weeks later, Khwela won the gold medal on vault at the 2010 Doha World Cup. This marked South Africa's first-ever gold at a World Cup event. She also won bronze on balance beam at the same competition.

At the 2010 Commonwealth Games, Khwela qualified for the vault final, winning the silver medal behind Imogen Cairns of England and ahead of Gabby May of Canada. This remains South Africa's highest gymnastics placement at the competition as of 2026. Khwela's sixth-place finish in the beam final is also South Africa's best result on that apparatus.

In October 2010, Khwela competed at the 2010 World Championships in Rotterdam. She finished 95th in the all-around, and her best individual apparatus result was 23rd on vault. Khwela concluded 2010 by competing at the Bumbo Gymnastics Cup in her home country, winning the silver medal on vault behind Katelyn Ohashi of the United States.

=== 2011-2012 ===
Khwela's 2011 season was significantly limited due to a wrist injury. In June, she was chosen as one of Mail & Guardian's 200 Young South Africans.

After undergoing and recovering from surgery, Khwela returned to competition in May 2012. Her final international competition was the Ostrava World Cup in November, where she placed fourth in the vault final and eighth in the floor final.
