= Shooting at the 2010 Commonwealth Games – Men's skeet singles =

The Men's skeet singles event took place at 13 October 2010 at the CRPF Campus. There were two qualification rounds held to determine the finalists.

== Results ==
Rank	Name	1	2	3	4	5	Final	Total
1st place, gold medalist(s)	Richard Brickell (ENG)	25	23	24	24	25	23	144^{+7}
2nd place, silver medalist(s)	Georgios Achilleos (CYP)	24	25	25	23	23	24	144^{+6}
3rd place, bronze medalist(s)	Andreas Chasikos (CYP)	25	25	25	25	22	21	143^{+6+2}
4	Drew Christie (SCO)	24	23	24	24	25	23	143^{+6+0}
5	Clive Bramley (ENG)	25	24	24	24	24	21	143^{+5+0}
6	Clive Barton (AUS)	24	25	24	24	23	22	142
