= Prashanth Sellathurai =

Australian artistic gymnast

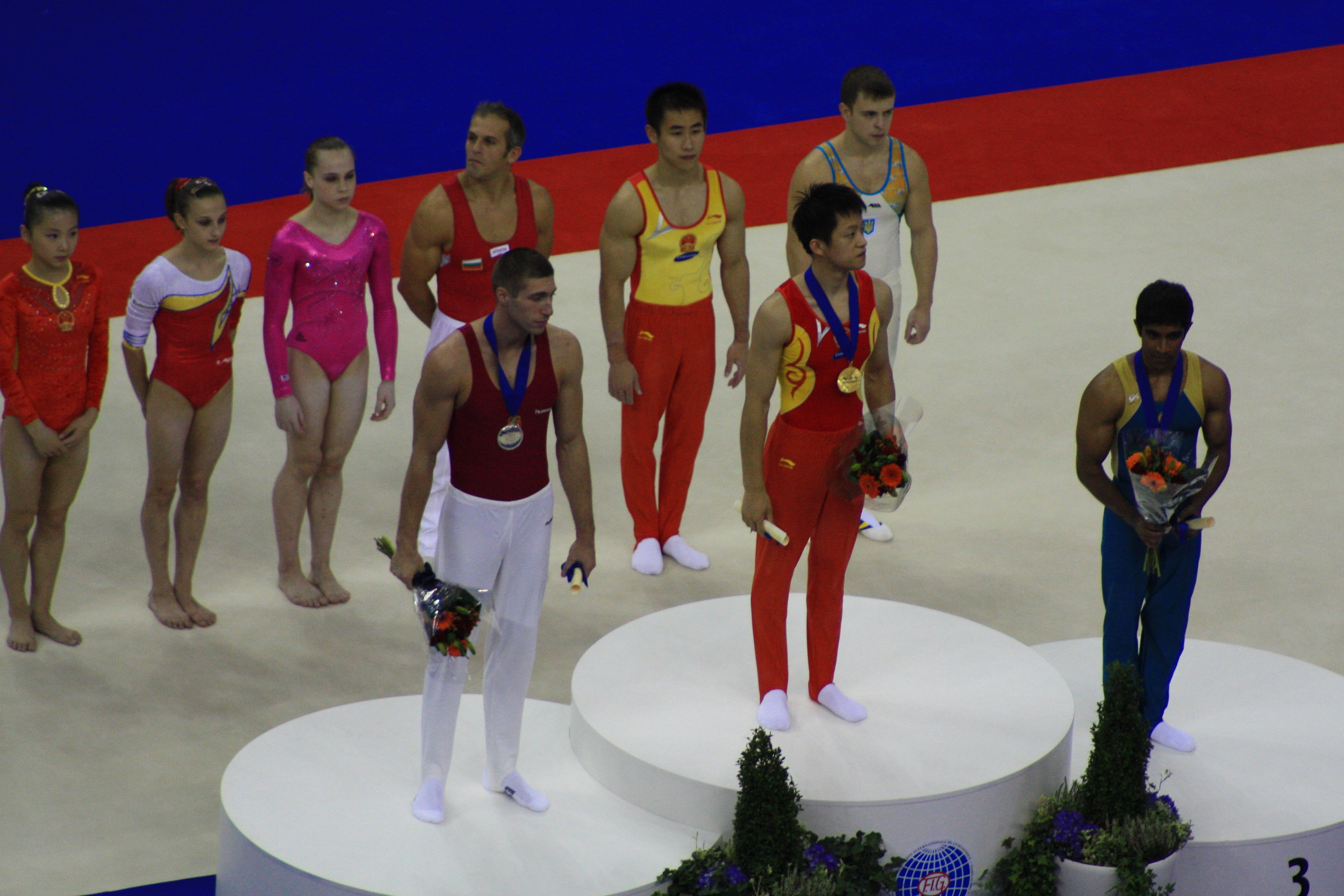
- Born: 1 October 1986 (age 40) Auburn, Australia
- Height: 1.50 m (4 ft 11 in)

Gymnastics career
- Discipline: Men's artistic gymnastics
- Country represented: Australia
Medal record
World Championships
Silver medal – second place	2006 Aarhus	Pommel horse
Bronze medal – third place	2009 London	Pommel horse
Bronze medal – third place	2010 Rotterdam	Pommel horse
Commonwealth Games
Gold medal – first place	2010 Delhi	Team
Gold medal – first place	2010 Delhi	Pommel horse
Silver medal – second place	2006 Melbourne	Team
Silver medal – second place	2006 Melbourne	Pommel horse
Bronze medal – third place	2010 Delhi	Parallel bars
Universiade
Gold medal – first place	2011 Shenzhen	Pommel horse

Prashanth Sellathurai (born 1 October 1986) is an Australian gymnast.

== Early life and education ==
Sellathurai's parents and ancestors are of Sri Lankan Tamil heritage and fled Sri Lanka to Australia as refugees. Sellathurai was born and raised in Australia. He was educated at Trinity Grammar School (New South Wales) in Sydney's inner west.

== Gymnastics career ==
Sellathurai was part of the Australian men's squad which won its first team gold medal in the Commonwealth Games at the 2010 event in New Delhi, which was sealed by his performance on the rings. He also won the pommel horse event in Delhi.

He is a three-time medallist on the pommel horse at the World Championships (two bronzes and one silver). He was a resident of Sydney, New South Wales.

He now volunteers at Milton Keynes Gymnastics, England.
