= Gymnastics at the 2010 Commonwealth Games – Women's vault =

The Women's vault event took place on 7 October 2010, at the Indira Gandhi Arena.

== Final ==
Position	Gymnast	D Score	E Score	Penalty	Score 1	D Score	E Score	Penalty	Score 2	Total
1st place, gold medalist(s)	Imogen Cairns (ENG)	5.300	8.850		14.150	4.800	8.600		13.400	13.775
2nd place, silver medalist(s)	Jennifer Khwela (RSA)	5.000	8.700		13.700	5.000	8.775		13.775	13.737
3rd place, bronze medalist(s)	Gabby May (CAN)	5.000	8.775		13.775	5.200	8.450		13.650	13.712
4	Kristin Klarenbach (CAN)	5.000	8.825		13.825	4.700	8.750		13.450	13.637
5	Jordan Rae (NZL)	4.600	8.750		13.350	4.400	8.575		12.975	13.162
6	Tracie Ang (MAS)	5.000	8.575	0.1	13.475	4.800	8.300	0.3	12.800	13.137
7	Dipa Karmakar (IND)	5.000	7.425	0.1	12.325	4.600	8.550	0.1	13.050	12.687
8	Seriena Johnrose (NIR)	4.400	8.800		13.200	4.000	8.250	0.1	12.150	12.675
Position	Gymnast	Vault 1				Vault 2				Total
