= Elaine Koon =

Malaysian rhythmic gymnast

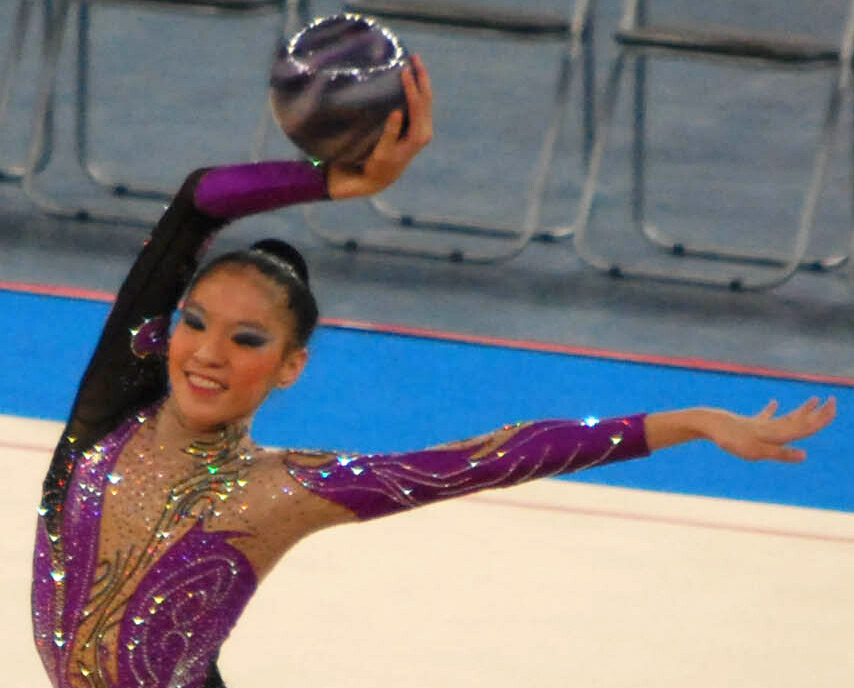
- Koon at the 2010 Commonwealth Games

Personal information
- Full name: Elaine Koon
- Born: 28 March 1993 (age 33) Los Angeles, California, United States

Gymnastics career
- Discipline: Rhythmic gymnastics
- Country represented: Malaysia
Medal record
Representing Malaysia
Rhythmic gymnastics
Commonwealth Games
Gold medal – first place	2010 New Delhi	Hoop
Silver medal – second place	2010 New Delhi	Ball
Bronze medal – third place	2010 New Delhi	Individual all-around
Bronze medal – third place	2010 New Delhi	Rope
Bronze medal – third place	2010 New Delhi	Ribbon

Elaine Koon (born c. 1993) is a former rhythmic gymnast known for being the first gymnast to ever win an individual rhythmic gymnastics gold medal for Malaysia in the 2010 Commonwealth Games. She competed at the 2009 World Championships, where she was 54th in the all-around, and the 2010 World Championships, where she was 40th in the all-around.

Koon also claimed a silver and three bronze medals at the 2010 Commonwealth Games. Her efforts earned her RM180,000 in cash reward from the National Sports Council (NSC). However, her relationship with national chief coach Elena Kholodova then deteriorated, with Koon saying that she no longer wished to train because she had been abused and asked to share her reward. Kholodova and the director of the NSC denied her allegations. Koon additionally alleged that Kholodova and the NSC had given her large amounts of painkillers rather than medical treatment for hip injuries prior to the Commonwealth Games. She officially retired in May 2011.
