= Gymnastics at the 2007 Games of the Small States of Europe =

Gymnastics events at the 2007 Games of the Small States of Europe were held in Monaco.

== Medalists ==
=== Artistic gymnastics ===
==== Men ====
Event	Gold	Silver	Bronze
Team all-around	Iceland; Viktor Kristmannsson; Dyri Kristjansson; Ingvar Jochumsson; Rúnar Alexandersson; Bjarki Asgeirsson	Cyprus; Herodotos Giorgallas; Nikolas Kylilis; Dimitris Krasias; Georgios Georgiou	Monaco; Flavien Norindr; Frederic Unternaehr; Nicolas Pollano; Carlo Bertolotto; Yann Franc de Ferriere
Individual all-around	Viktor Kristmannsson (ISL)	Herodotos Giorgallas (CYP)	Frederic Unternaehr (MON)
Floor exercise	Viktor Kristmannsson (ISL)	Georgios Georgiou (CYP)	Oliver Waldbillig (LUX)
Pommel horse	Frederic Unternaehr (MON)	Viktor Kristmannsson (ISL) Dimitris Krasias (CYP)	—
Rings	Herodotos Giorgallas (CYP)	Rúnar Alexandersson (ISL)	Georgios Georgiou (CYP)
Vault	Herodotos Giorgallas (CYP)	Viktor Kristmannsson (ISL)	Philip Caruana (MLT)
Parallel bars	Rúnar Alexandersson (ISL)	Viktor Kristmannsson (ISL)	Frederic Unternaehr (MON)
Horizontal bar	Frederic Unternaehr (MON)	Dyri Kristjansson (ISL)	Viktor Kristmannsson (ISL)

==== Women ====
Event	Gold	Silver	Bronze
Team all-around	Iceland; Thelma Hermannsdottir; Sigrun Tryggvadottir; Fridda Einarsdottir; Kristina Olafsdottir	Luxembourg; Lara Marx; Fabienne Scholtes; Izabela Anna Golinska; Dinis Joana Quiaios	Cyprus; Marilena Georgiou; Athena Stavrinaki-Panayi; Nikoleta Dimitriou; Paraskevi Krasia
Individual all-around	Fridda Einarsdottir (ISL)	Lara Marx (LUX)	Kristina Olafsdottir (ISL)
Vault	Lara Marx (LUX)	Athena Stavrinaki-Panayi (CYP)	Paraskevi Krasia (CYP)
Uneven bars	Lara Marx (LUX)	Fridda Einarsdottir (ISL)	Kristina Olafsdottir (ISL)
Balance beam	Lara Marx (LUX)	Fridda Einarsdottir (ISL)	Rachel Rominger (MON)
Floor exercise	Fridda Einarsdottir (ISL)	Marilena Georgiou (CYP)	Kristina Olafsdottir (ISL)
