= Gymnastics at the 2009 Games of the Small States of Europe =

Gymnastics events at the 2009 Games of the Small States of Europe were held in Cyprus.

== Medalists ==
=== Artistic gymnastics ===
==== Men ====
Event	Gold	Silver	Bronze
Team all-around	Cyprus; Herodotos Giorgallas; Constantinos Aristotelous; Panayiotis Aristotelous; Dimitris Krasias; Georgios Georgiou	Monaco; Paul-Alexis Ranc; Frederic Unternaehr; Romain Gobaux; Julien Gobaux; Kevin Croveto	Iceland; Viktor Kristmannsson; Robert Kristmannsson; Ingvar Jochumsson; Olafur Gunnarsson; Bjarki Asgeirsson
Individual all-around	Dimitris Krasias (CYP)	Constantinos Aristotelous (CYP)	Julien Gobaux (MON)
Floor exercise	Oliver Waldbillig (LUX)	Julien Gobaux (MON)	Olafur Gunnarsson (ISL)
Pommel horse	Bjarki Asgeirsson (ISL)	Georgios Georgiou (CYP)	Dimitris Krasias (CYP)
Rings	Georgios Georgiou (CYP) Herodotos Giorgallas (CYP)	—	Frederic Unternaehr (MON) Viktor Kristmannsson (ISL)
Vault	Constantinos Aristotelous (CYP)	Georgios Georgiou (CYP)	Sascha Palgen (LUX)
Parallel bars	Herodotos Giorgallas (CYP)	Panayiotis Aristotelous (CYP) Viktor Kristmannsson (ISL)	—
Horizontal bar	Dimitris Krasias (CYP)	Constantinos Aristotelous (CYP)	Frederic Unternaehr (MON)

==== Women ====
Event	Gold	Silver	Bronze
Team all-around	Cyprus; Marilena Georgiou; Athena Stavrinaki-Panayi; Nikoleta Dimitriou; Antonia Georgiou; Chrysia Dimitriadou	Iceland; Thelma Hermannsdottir; Sigrun Tryggvadottir; Harpa Steindottir; Fridda Einarsdottir; Dominiqua Belanyi	Malta; Kirsty Caruana; Nicole Pace; Adreana Jo Zammit
Individual all-around	Antonia Georgiou (CYP)	Fridda Einarsdottir (ISL)	Athena Stavrinaki-Panayi (CYP)
Vault	Laurence Risse (LUX)	Athena Stavrinaki-Panayi (CYP)	Marilena Georgiou (CYP)
Uneven bars	Nikoleta Dimitriou (CYP)	Fridda Einarsdottir (ISL)	Laurence Risse (LUX)
Balance beam	Antonia Georgiou (CYP)	Fridda Einarsdottir (ISL)	Rachel Rominger (MON)
Floor exercise	Thelma Hermannsdottir (ISL)	Fridda Einarsdottir (ISL)	Kirsty Caruana (MLT)

=== Rhythmic gymnastics ===
==== Women ====
Event	Gold	Silver	Bronze
Individual all-around	Loukia Trikomiti (CYP)	Chrystalleni Trikomiti (CYP)	Katerina Chrystodoulou (CYP)
Rope	Loukia Trikomiti (CYP)	Katerina Chrystodoulou (CYP)	Elisa Cavalli (SMR)
Hoop	Loukia Trikomiti (CYP)	Katerina Chrystodoulou (CYP)	Sofia Travesset (AND)
Ball	Loukia Trikomiti (CYP)	Chrystalleni Trikomiti (CYP)	Giada Della Valle (SMR)
Ribbon	Chrystalleni Trikomiti (CYP)	Loukia Trikomiti (CYP)	Giada Della Valle (SMR)
