= Chrystalleni Trikomiti =

Cypriot rhythmic gymnast (born 1993)

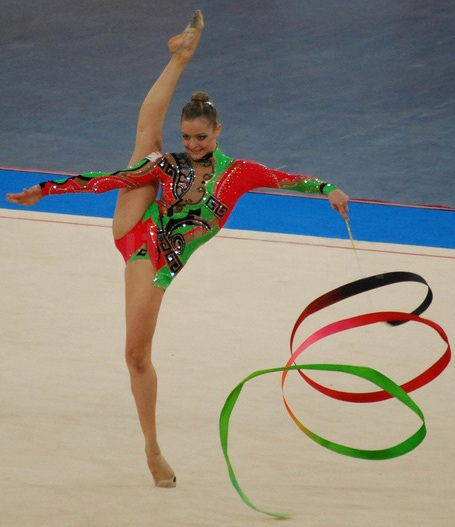
- Trikomiti during her ribbon routine at the 2010 Commonwealth Games.

Personal information
- Born: 30 November 1993 (age 32) Larnaca, Cyprus
- Height: 1.62 m (5 ft 4 in)

Gymnastics career
- Discipline: Rhythmic gymnastics
- Country represented: Cyprus
- Club: Andreas Tricomitis
- Head coach: Natalia Raskina
Medal record
Rhythmic gymnastics
Representing Cyprus
Commonwealth Games
Gold medal – first place	2010 Delhi	Ribbon
Gold medal – first place	2010 Delhi	Rope
Silver medal – second place	2010 Delhi	All-around
Bronze medal – third place	2010 Delhi	Hoop
Bronze medal – third place	2010 Delhi	Ball
Games of the Small States of Europe
Gold medal – first place	2009 Cyprus	Ribbon
Silver medal – second place	2009 Cyprus	All-around
Silver medal – second place	2009 Cyprus	Ball

Chrystalleni Trikomiti (Greek: Χρυσταλλένη Τρικωμίτη; born 30 November 1993) is a rhythmic gymnast from Cyprus who competed at the 2010 Commonwealth Games and the 2012 Summer Olympics.

== Personal life ==
Trikomiti is the third of five siblings, and her older sister Loukia (born 7 September 1990) also competed in rhythmic gymnastics and attempted to qualify for the 2008 Summer Olympics. She graduated with a degree in law but is currently working as a head coach at the Andreas Trikomitis club. In 2016, she was appointed the Cyprus Ambassador of Fair Play.

Her mother, Evangelia Trikomiti, is an executive committee member at European Gymnastics and was banned from judging for four years in February 2025. She was sanctioned by the Gymnastics Ethics Foundation Disciplinary Commission for performing score manipulation to win Vera Tugolukova, who Chrystalleni Trikomiti coaches, the single Olympic quota available at the 2024 European Championships.

== Career ==
Trikomiti competed at the 2009 World Championships, where she placed 49th in the all-around, and the 2010 World Championships, where she finished 28th.

A month later, she competed at the 2010 Commonwealth Games in Delhi, India, where she won two gold medals, one silver medal, and two bronze medals. She narrowly missed the gold in the all-around performance when she dropped her ball. She had been tied with Naazmi Johnston from Australia with 75.425 points, but the drop cost her the gold, and she finished with the silver.

At the 2011 World Championships, she placed 21st in the final. She qualified to compete at the 2012 Summer Olympics by winning a quota at the 2012 Gymnastics Olympic Test Event held in January. At the Olympics, she finished 19th in qualifications and did not advance to the final.

As a coach, her trainees have included Anna Sokolova, Diamanto Evripidou, and Vera Tugolukova.

== Medals at Commonwealth Games 2010 ==
Medal	Sport	Event	Date
Bronze	Gymnastics	Women's rhythmic individual hoop	October 14
Bronze	Gymnastics	Women's rhythmic individual ball	October 14
Silver	Gymnastics	Women's rhythmic individual all-around	October 13
Gold	Gymnastics	Women's rhythmic individual rope	October 14
Gold	Gymnastics	Women's rhythmic individual ribbon	October 14
