= Gabby May =

Canadian artistic gymnast (born 1993)

Gabrielle May
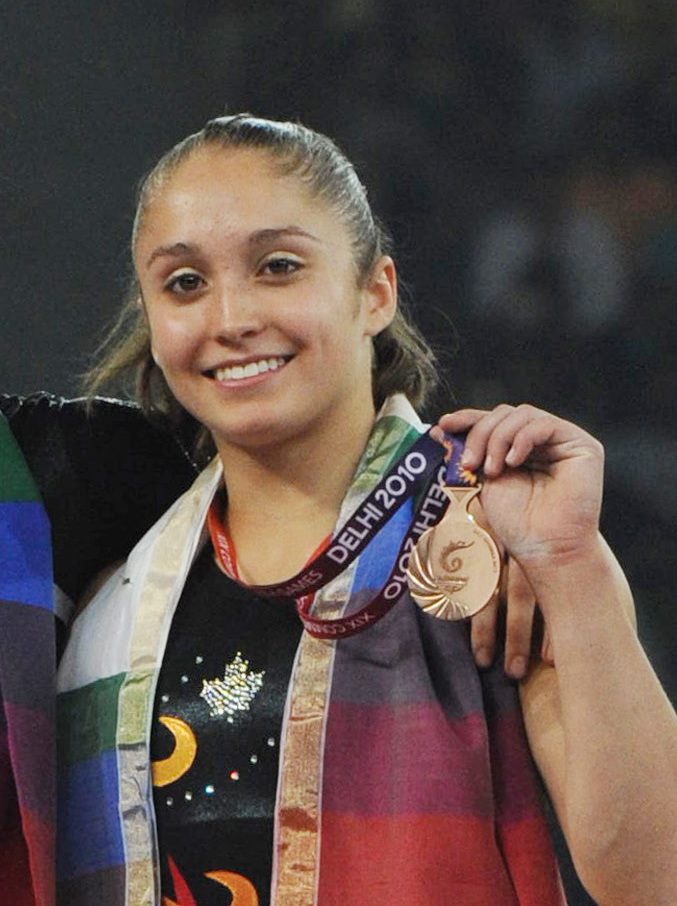
- May at the 2010 Commonwealth Games

Personal information
- Born: 29 December 1993 (age 32)

Gymnastics career
- Country represented: Canada
Medal record
Commonwealth Games
Bronze medal – third place	2010 Delhi	Vault
Bronze medal – third place	2010 Delhi	Team all-around

Gabby May (born 29 December 1993) is a Canadian artistic gymnast.

May attended high school at Collège Jeanne-Sauvé and studied English at the University of Illinois at Chicago.

She competed at the 2010 Commonwealth Games where she won bronze medals in the vault and team all-around events.
