= Greg Barden =

British Entrepreneur

- Born: Greg Barden; 8 February 1981 (age 45); Perth, Australia.
- Occupations: CEO and Founder of xplore.

Greg Barden
Rugby union career
- Position: Centre
Amateur team(s)
Years	Team	Apps	(Points)
2005–2012	Royal Navy		
Senior career
Years	Team	Apps	(Points)
2008–2009	Bristol Rugby	8	
International career
Years	Team	Apps	(Points)
–	England Sevens	12	
National sevens team
Years	Team		Comps
2009–2012	England		12

Greg Barden (born 8 February 1981 in Perth, Western Australia, Australia) is a British entrepreneur and the founder of Xplore Local, a discovery platform and grassroots movement created to unite communities and empower certified independent businesses in the fight against corporate dominance.

== Career ==
After School, Barden at the age of 16 joined the Royal Marines where he served in 45 Commando seeing service in Kosovo. At the age 20 Barden became the youngest person to complete United Kingdom Special Forces Selection and join the Special Boat Service (SBS) seeing service in Afghanistan, Iraq and other countries across the world.

In 2007, Barden having served in the UK military for 11 years, joined Bristol Rugby as a rugby union player in the Guinness Premiership. He played as a centre. In 2009 Barden got picked to play for the England Rugby Sevens where he would eventually be named as Captain for 2011/12 season.

In May 2012, Barden retired from professional rugby and founded Xplore Local.

== Club career ==
He has 12 caps for the Royal Navy rugby team and two caps for the Combined Services. He was picked to play for the England Rugby Sevens squad in 2009 where they beat New Zealand in London. His fifth career try in the IRB Sevens World Series came during the final game of 2009-10 when England lost 15–12 to Samoa in Edinburgh at the end of May. He was picked for the England 7's team for the 2010 Commonwealth Games in Delhi. He was named England sevens captain for the 2011/2012 season.
