= Rachel Ennis =

British gymnast and coach

- Born: June 21, 1987 (age 39) Hillingdon

Gymnastics career
- Discipline: Rhythmic gymnastics
- Club: West London Gymnastics
- Head coaches: Nadia Alexandrova, Villy Antonova
- Retired: yes
Medal record
Representing England
Rhythmic Gymnastics
Commonwealth Games
Bronze medal – third place	2010 Delhi	Team

Rachel Ennis (born 21 June 1987) is a retired British rhythmic gymnast and coach. She represented the United Kingdom and England in international competitions.

== Career ==
In June 2005 Ennis competed in the European Championships in Moscow, taking 23rd place in teams. Then she was selected for her maiden World Championships in Baku, she was 81st in the All-Around, 65th with rope, 81st with ball, 89th with clubs and 81st with ribbon.

In 2006 she was part of the English team for the 2006 Commonwealth Games in Melbourne, there she placed 4th in teams along Hannah Chappell and Heather Mann.

After a two-year injury-enforced absence Ennis returned to competition in September 2010, when she was selected for the World Championships in Moscow, placing 25th in teams (along Lynne Hutchison and Frankie Jones), 96th in the All-Around, 108th with rope, 73rd with hoop, 103rd with ball and 110th with ribbon. A month later she took part in her second Commonwealth Games in Delhi, being 7th in the hoop final and winning bronze in teams along Francesca Fox and Lynne Hutchison.

As of 2025 Ennis is coaching at the West London Gymnastics along her former trainer Villy Antonova. One of her trainees being Marfa Ekimova who won gold in the All-Around at the 2022 Commonwealth Games in Birmingham.
