= Dimitris Krasias =

Cypriot artistic gymnast

- Born: 1 April 1992 (age 34) Limassol, Cyprus
- Height: 5 ft 10 in (178 cm)

Gymnastics career
- Discipline: Men's artistic gymnastics
- Country represented: Cyprus
Medal record
Men's artistic gymnastics
Representing Cyprus
Commonwealth Games
Gold medal – first place	2010 Delhi	Horizontal bar
Games of the Small States of Europe
Gold medal – first place	2009 Cyprus	Team
Gold medal – first place	2009 Cyprus	All-around
Gold medal – first place	2009 Cyprus	Horizontal bar
Silver medal – second place	2007 Monaco	Team
Silver medal – second place	2007 Monaco	Pommel horse
Bronze medal – third place	2009 Cyprus	Pommel horse

Dimitris Krasias (Greek: Δημήτρης Κρασιάς; born 1 April 1992) is a Cypriot former artistic gymnast.

Krasias, born in Limassol, began competing in gymnastics at the age of five. He came fourth in parallel bars at the 2008 European Junior Championships and was fifth in the same discipline at the 2009 Mediterranean Games.

In 2010, Krasias claimed a surprise gold medal at the Delhi Commonwealth Games in the horizontal bar, becoming the first Cypriot winner for that discipline. A medical student at the time, Krasias was coached by Dimitris Aggonas.
