= Steve Jehu =

British artistic gymnast (born 1987)

- Full name: Steven Jehu
- Born: 1 April 1987 (age 39) Penzance, England

Gymnastics career
- Discipline: Men's artistic gymnastics
- Country represented: (United Kingdom) Great Britain; England
Medal record
Men's artistic gymnastics
Representing England
Commonwealth Games
Silver medal – second place	2010 Delhi	Team

Steven Jehu (born 1 April 1987) is a British artistic gymnast from Exeter, Devon. In October 2010 he was part of the team which won the silver medal for England in the gymnastics in the men's artistic all-around team event at the 2010 Commonwealth Games.

In 2004, Jehu survived a 33-foot fall from a hotel window in Ljubljana, Slovenia, by completing a mid-air loop and gymnasts' landing to escape with only a broken ankle. The attending doctor who operated on his ankle said that he would have died if he hadn't used his gymnastic skills.
