= Naazmi Johnston =

Australian rhythmic gymnast

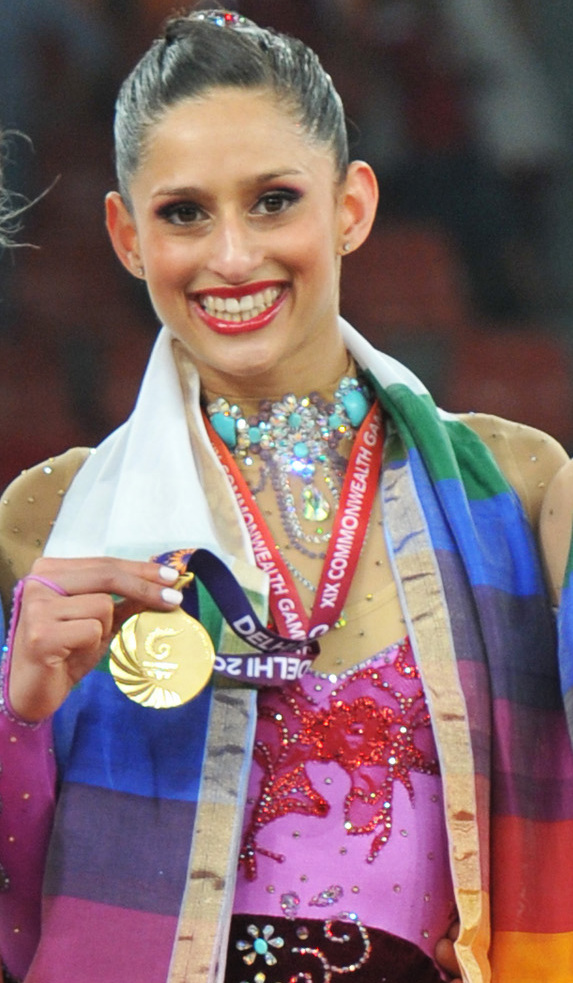
- Johnston with her ball final gold medal at the 2010 Commonwealth Games.

Personal information
- Full name: Ayiesha Naazmi Johnston
- Born: 28 November 1988 (age 37) Sydney, Australia

Gymnastics career
- Discipline: Rhythmic gymnastics
- Country represented: Australia
Medal record
Commonwealth Games
Gold medal – first place	2010 Delhi	Team
Gold medal – first place	2010 Delhi	All-around
Gold medal – first place	2010 Delhi	Ball
Silver medal – second place	2010 Delhi	Ribbon
Silver medal – second place	2010 Delhi	Rope
Bronze medal – third place	2006 Melbourne	Team

Ayiesha Naazmi Johnston (born 28 November 1988) is an Australian rhythmic gymnast who represented Australia at the 2008 Summer Olympics as well as the 2006 Commonwealth Games. She competed at world championships, including at the 2005 World Rhythmic Gymnastics Championships, 2009 World Rhythmic Gymnastics Championships and 2010 World Rhythmic Gymnastics Championships.

== Career ==
Johnston was born on 28 November 1988 to an Australian father and Maldivian mother. Her sister, Shaneez, has also competed in gymnastics for Australia. Johnston was a participant on the show Australia's Got Talent with a group called Meriden Rhythmix, they performed routines of rhythmic gymnastics and made it to the semi-finals before being eliminated. Johnston has been ranked as Australia's best gymnast on several occasions. She was coached by Danielle Le Ray. She currently has two Boxer puppies, Lewis and Georgia.

== School life ==
Naazmi Johnston studied at Concord Primary school. She attended high school at Newtown High School of the Performing Arts and Moreton Bay College.
