= Francesca Fox =

British rhythmic gymnast

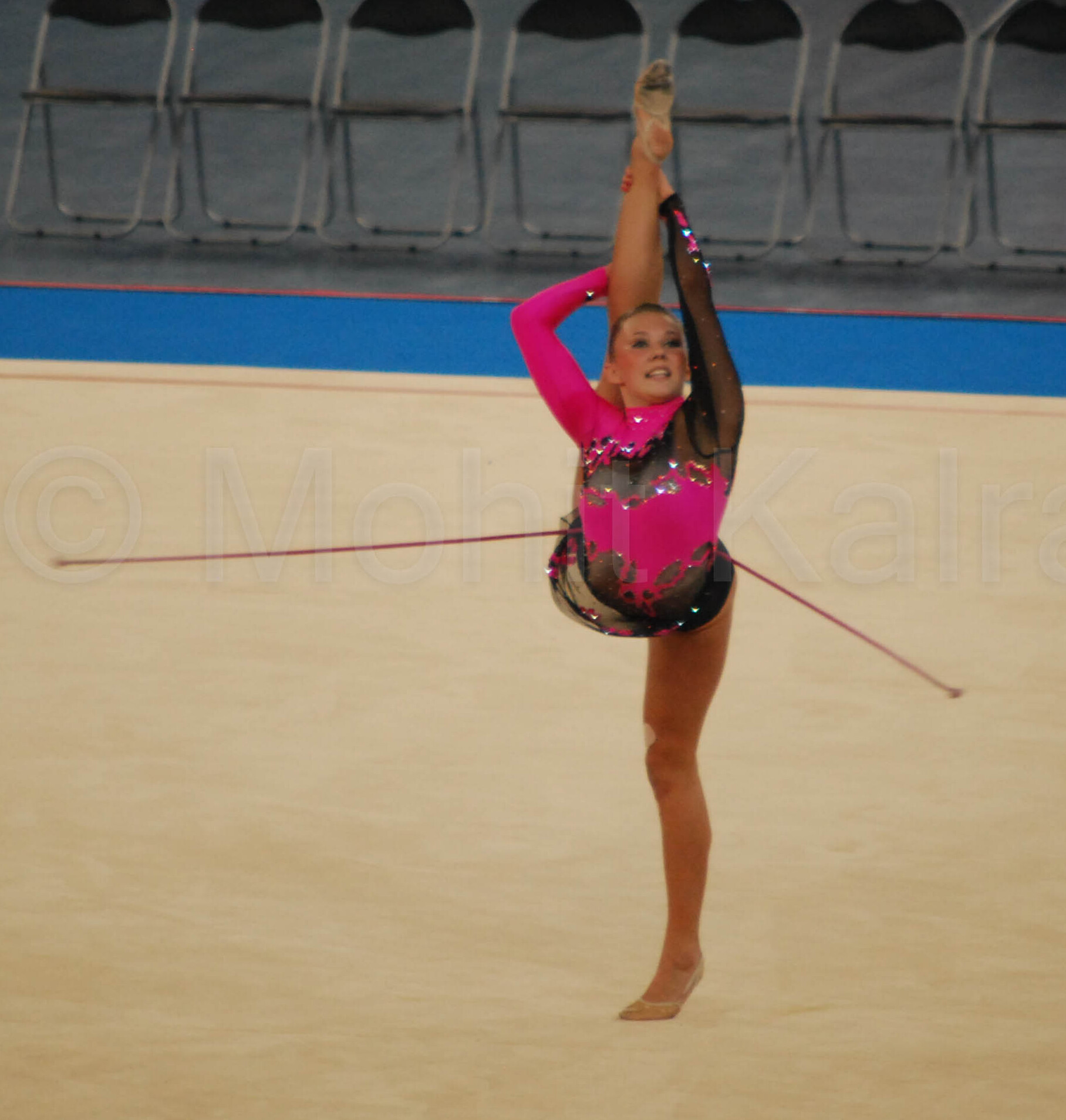

Personal information
- Full name: Francesca Amber Fox
- Born: 13 June 1992 (age 34)

Gymnastics career
- Discipline: Rhythmic gymnastics
- Country represented: United Kingdom
- Club: City of Bath Rhythmic Gymnastics Club
Medal record
Representing England
Rhythmic Gymnastics
Commonwealth Games
Bronze medal – third place	2010 Delhi	Team

Francesca Amber Fox (born 13 June 1992) is a retired rhythmic gymnast. Born in Trowbridge, Wiltshire, England, Fox represented Great Britain in the team event at the 2012 London Olympics.

== Career ==
Fox took up gymnastics at the age of four after a coach happened to spot her on a trampoline during her sister’s birthday party.

In 2008 she won gold at the British Championships. The following year she was selected for the World Championships in Mie, being 77th in the All-Around, 91st with rope, 74th with hoop, 80th with ball, 80th with ribbon and 23rd in teams along Jade Faulkner and Francesca Jones.

Competing at the 2010 Commonwealth Games in Delhi she was 11th overall, 10th with rope, 11th with hoop, 10th with ball, 10th with ribbon and won bronze in team with Rachel Ennis and Lynne Hutchison.

In 2012 she was included into the British senior group, taking part in the Olympic Test Event, despite team GB already being granted a spot thanks to the host nation quota, finishing 8th in the All-Around and in the two event finals. In August she competed at the Olympics Games in London alonside Georgina Cassar, Jade Faulkner, Lynne Hutchison, Louisa Pouli and Rachel Smith. There they were 12th in the All-Around, 11th with 5 balls and 12th with 3 ribbons & 2 hoops, thus not advancing to the final.

After becoming an Olympian she retired from the sport. Fox then moved to Mallorca, where she was cast as Captain Scarlet at the world-famous Pirates Adventure spectacle in Magaluf. In 2016 she opened the Francesca Fox Gymnastics school at the Baleares International College. In 2020 she was one of the gymnasts that accused British Gymnastics to having covered up abuse.
