= Gymnastics at the 2010 Commonwealth Games – Women's rhythmic team all-around =

Women's rhythmic team event, Commonwealth Games

The Women's rhythmic team all-around event took place on 12 October 2010 at Indira Gandhi Arena in Delhi, India.

== Final ==
Nation	Rope (rhythmic gymnastics)	Hoop (rhythmic gymnastics)	Ball (rhythmic gymnastics)	Ribbon (rhythmic gymnastics)	Total
Australia	70.275 (1)	69.925 (1)	70.225 (1)	69.600 (1)	235.775
Canada	66.025 (2)	64.925 (3)	69.125 (2)	66.050 (2)	224.325
England	64.200 (3)	68.500 (2)	63.425 (3)	65.425 (3)	220.475
New Zealand	63.100 (4)	62.225 (4)	61.750 (4)	59.100 (4)	207.725
India	53.200 (5)	50.250 (5)	54.100 (5)	49.800 (5)	174.850

== Sources ==
- Results
