= Lynne Hutchison =

British rhythmic gymnast

Lynne Karina Hutchison OLY
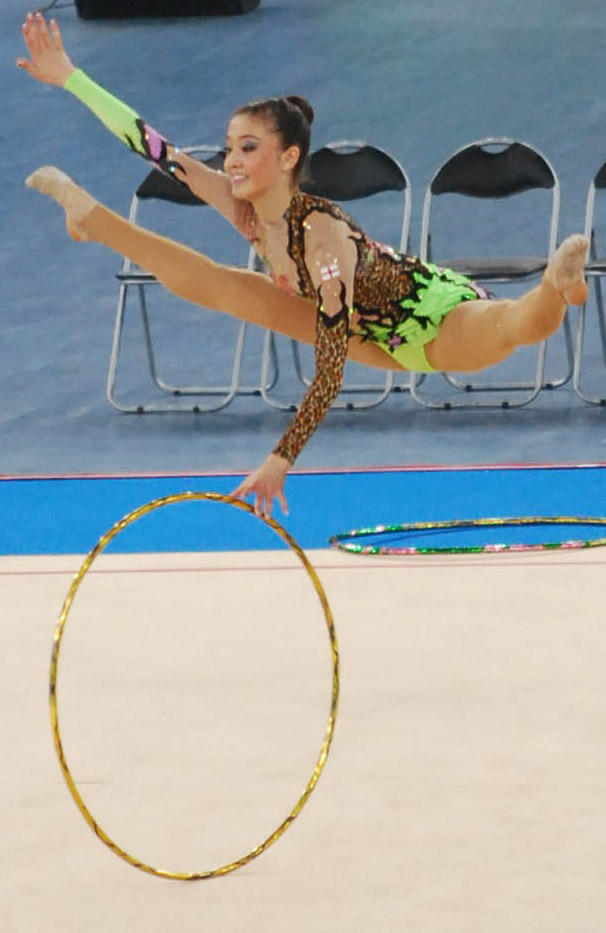
- Hutchison at the 2010 Commonwealth Games
- Born: 10 November 1994 (age 32) Tokyo, Japan
- Height: 1.74 m (5 ft 9 in)

Gymnastics career
- Discipline: Rhythmic gymnastics
- Country represented: Great Britain England
- Club: City of Bath Rhythmic Gymnastics Club
- Head coach: Sarah Moon
Medal record
Rhythmic gymnastics
Representing England
Commonwealth Games
Bronze medal – third place	2010 Delhi	Team

Lynne Karina Hutchison OLY (born 1994 in Tokyo, Japan) is a British rhythmic gymnast who represented England at the 2010 Commonwealth Games in Delhi, India, where she won a bronze medal in the team event. She also competed for Team GB at the 2012 Summer Olympics in London, United Kingdom.

Hutchison was born in Tokyo to Japanese mother Kuniko and British father Brian. She moved to Britain with her family at the age of two. Hutchison, while attending primary school in Combe Down, Bath, was invited by Sarah Moon, the head coach of the City of Bath Rhythmic Gymnastics Club, to come along to the gym. Hutchison started training at the club on the same day as Francesca Fox, who would later also represent Great Britain at the 2012 Summer Olympics. Hutchison attended King Edward's School, Bath, and trained at the University of Bath.
