= Janine Murray =

Australian rhythmic gymnast (born 1990)

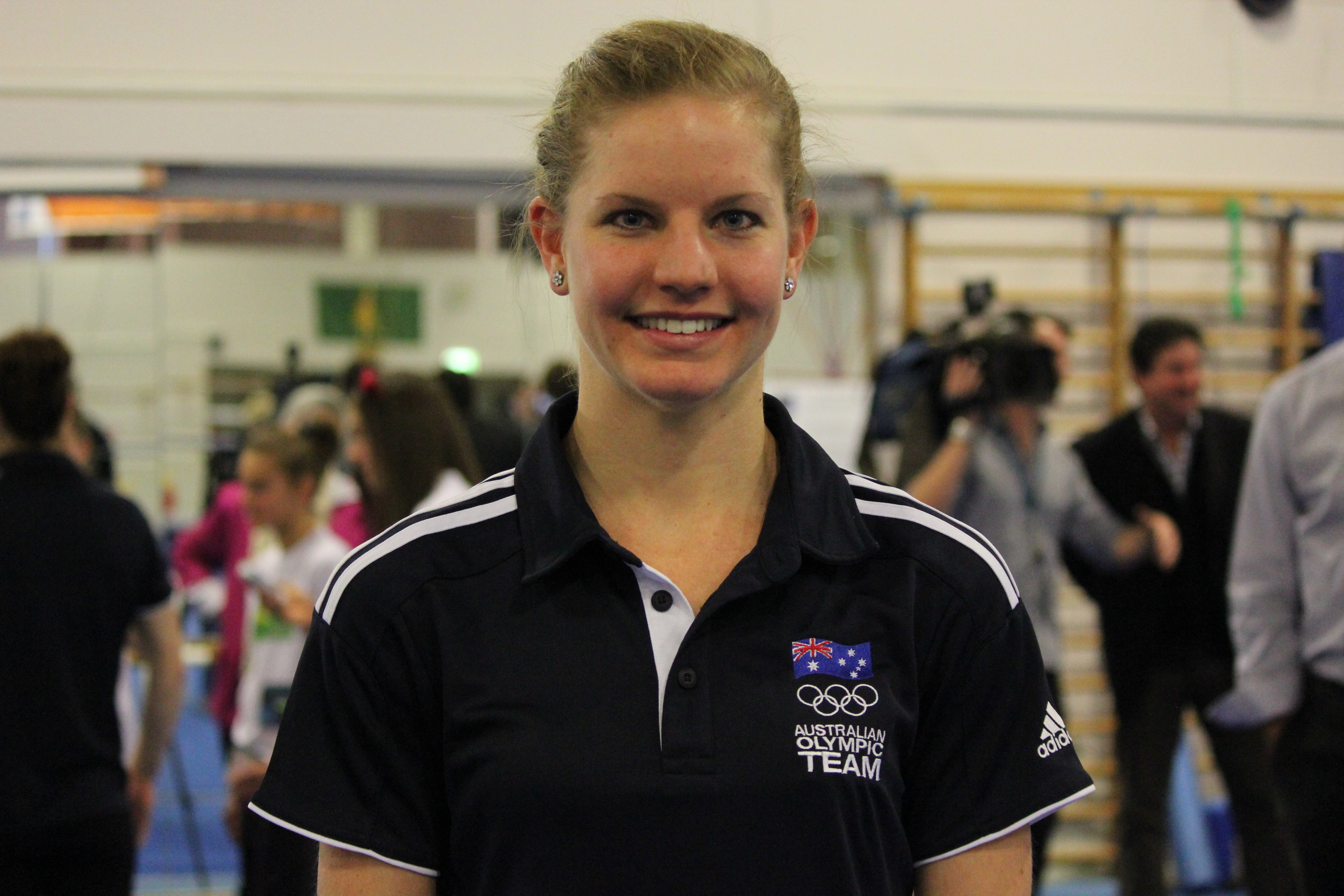
- Janine Murray at the Australian Institute of Sport

Personal information
- Nickname: Jeannie
- Born: 10 March 1990 (age 36) Harare, Zimbabwe

Gymnastics career
- Discipline: Rhythmic gymnastics
- Country represented: Australia; (2006 – present)
- Club: Rhythmic Gymnastics High Performance Centre
Medal record
Rhythmic gymnastics
Representing Australia
Commonwealth Games
Gold medal – first place	2010 Delhi	Team
Pacific Rim Championships
Silver medal – second place	2012 Everett	Ball
Silver medal – second place	2012 Everett	Hoop
Bronze medal – third place	2010 Melbourne	Team
Bronze medal – third place	2012 Everett	All-around
Bronze medal – third place	2012 Everett	Ribbon

Janine Murray (born 10 March 1990) is a Zimbabwean born Australian rhythmic gymnast. She won a gold medal in the team event at the 2010 Commonwealth Games and represented Australia at the 2012 Summer Olympics.

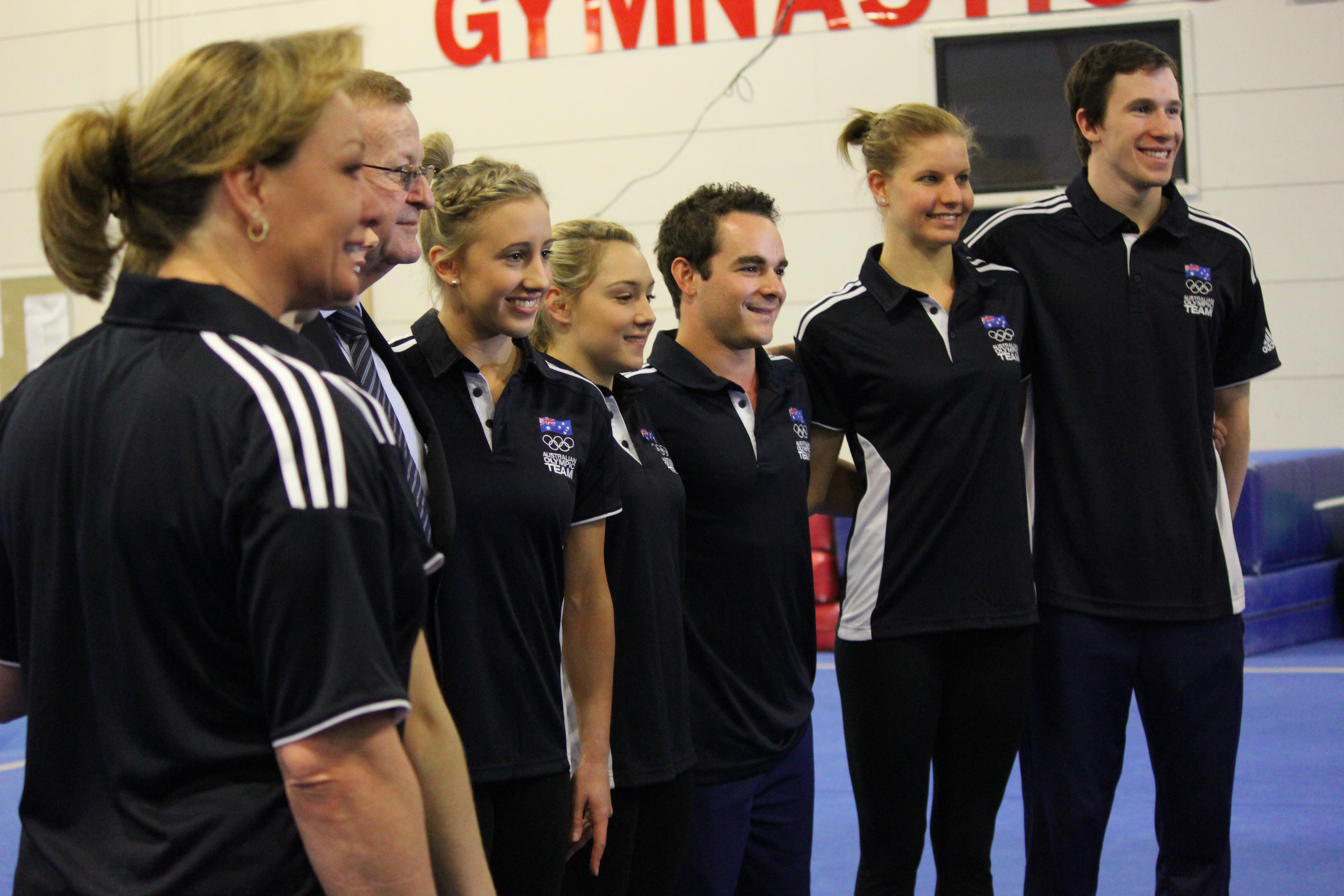
Murray, second from the right, with her Australian gymnastic Olympic teammates at the Australian Institute of Sport.

== Personal ==
Nicknamed Jeannie, Murray was born on 10 March 1990 in Harare, Zimbabwe and attended primary school while living there. As a child, she dealt with food and petrol shortages, with the latter making it difficult for her to get to her school, Chisipite Junior School in Harare. She moved to Perth, Western Australia in 2002, and continues to reside there. She attended Presbyterian Ladies' College in Western Australia. She worked on a degree in sports science at the University of Western Australia in a programme she started in 2008.

Murray is 169 centimetres (67 in) tall and weighs 56 kilograms (123 lb). She has ballet skills. One of her hobbies is cooking.

== Rhythmic gymnastics ==
Murray competes in rhythmic gymnastics and is a ribbon specialist. She started in the sport while in primary school as a six-year-old because one of her best friends was participating in the sport. Her first coach was Makoto Sato at the Rolf Valley Gymnastics.

Murray is coached by former Bulgarian gymnast Krasimira Yurukova, who has been her coach since she lived in Zimbabwe. She competes for Rhythmic Gymnastics High Performance Centre on the club level.

At the Australian senior national championships in the all around event, Murray finished first in 2012, second in 2008, 2010 and 2011, third in 2007 and fourth in 2006. In the hoop event, she finished first in 2012, second in 2008, 2010 and 2011, and third in 2007. In the rope event, she finished second in 2008, and third in 2006, 2007, and 2010. In the ball event, she finished first in 2012, second in 2010 and 2011, and fourth in 2006. In the clubs event, she finished first in 2012, second in 2008 and 2011, third in 2007 and seventh in 2006. In the ribbons event, she finished first in 2011 and 2012, second in 2008 and 2010, and third in 2006 and 2007. At the 2012 Australian National Championships, she won every one of the five available gold medals.

Murray made her senior national team debut in 2006. She has competed at the 2007, 2009 and 2010 World Championships. She won a gold medal at the 2010 Commonwealth Games in the team event. She finished 5th in the ribbon, 6th in the ball and rope, and 7th in the all around competition. She competed in the 2011 World Championships in Montpellier, where she secured a spot for a competitor from Oceania to compete at the 2012 Summer Olympics. In 2012, she won three medals, two silvers and a bronze, at the Pacific Rim Championships in Seattle.

Murray represented Australia at the 2012 Summer Olympics in women's rhythmic gymnastics. She was one of the first two gymnasts from Australia selected for the Games, and will be the first Western Australian to compete in rhythmic gymnastics at the Olympics. Her Olympic qualification came about through a wildcard entry after she was the top ranked competitor from Oceania at the 2011 World Championships.
