= 2010 in Pakistan =

- Decades: 1990s; 2000s; 2010s; 2020s
- See also: History of Pakistan; List of years in Pakistan; Timeline of Pakistani history

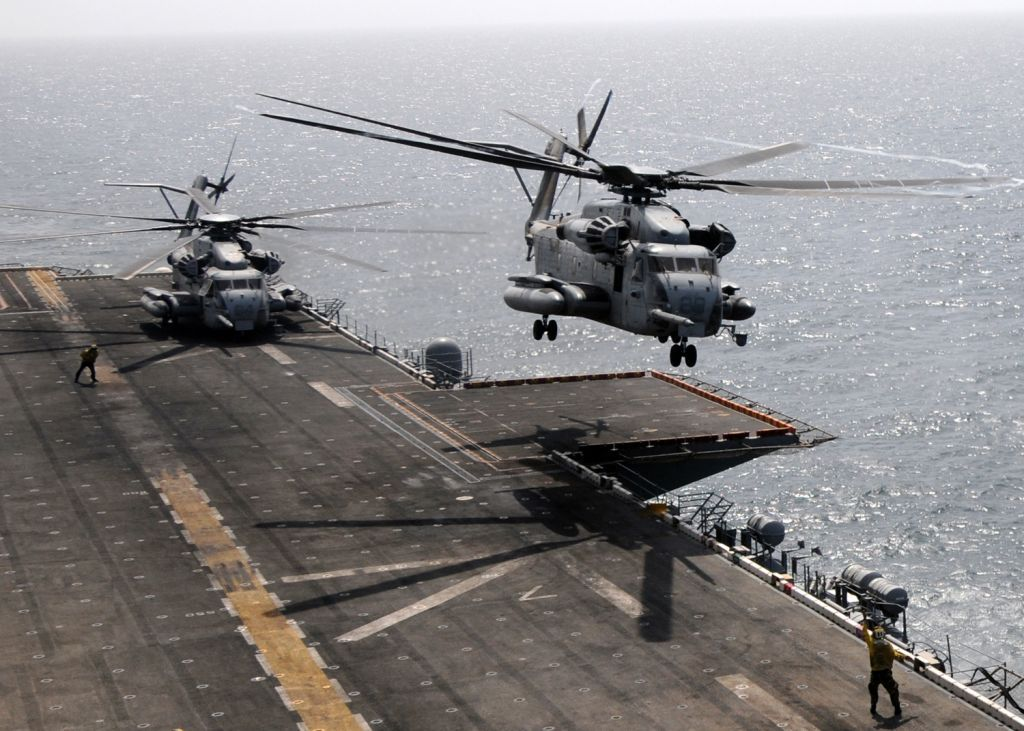
A Marine Corps CH-53E Sea Stallion assigned to Helicopter Marine Medium Squadron "White Knights"

Events from the year 2010 in Pakistan.

== Incumbents ==
=== Federal government ===
- President: Asif Ali Zardari
- Prime Minister: Yousaf Raza Gillani
- Chief Justice: Iftikhar Muhammad Chaudhry

=== Governors ===
- Governor of Balochistan – Nawab Zulfikar Ali Magsi
- Governor of Gilgit-Baltistan –
  - until 22 March: Qamar Zaman Kaira
  - 22 March-15 September: Shama Khalid
  - starting 17 September: Wazir Baig
- Governor of Khyber Pakhtunkhwa – Owais Ahmed Ghani
- Governor of Punjab – Salmaan Taseer
- Governor of Sindh – Ishrat-ul-Ibad Khan

== Events ==
=== January ===
- 1 January – A suicide bombing occurs at a volleyball game in northwestern Pakistan, killing at least 95, and injuring over 100.
- 13 January – A train hit a school bus at an ungated railway crossing in Pakistan's Punjab Province near to the town of Mian Channu, killing 8 children and injuring several others.
- 30 January – A suicide bombing occurs at a military checkpoint within the town of Khar, in the Bajaur Agency, killing at least 16 people and injuring around 25 others.

=== February ===
- Three Sikhs were beheaded by Taliban groups.
- 3 February – A suicide bombing occurs within the Lower Dir District area of the country, killing at least 8 people, including 3 American soldiers and injuring around 70 other people.
- 5 February – Twin bombings, one of which includes a suicide attack occurred within the Pakistani city of Karachi, killing at least 25 people and injuring more than 50 others.
- 10 February – A suicide bombing targeting a police patrol in the Khyber Agency killed at least 19 people, including 13 local policemen.
- 17 February – Avalanche in the Kohistan District, killing over 100 people.
- 18 February – A bombing at a local mosque in the Tirah Valley of the Khyber Agency, killed at least 30 people and injured more than 70 others.

=== March ===
- 12 March – Three separate suicide bombings targeting Pakistani security forces occurred from 8 March till 12 March. It is known that more than 72 people were killed in these three-related suicide attacks and more than 190 others were injured.

=== April ===
- 5 April – A series of coordinated bombings at the U.S. consulate in Peshawar and at a ruling party rally in the North-West Frontier Province kills 50 people and injured 100 others.
- 8 April – Pakistan adopts the 18th amendment to the Constitution, stripping President Asif Ali Zardari of key powers.
- 10 April – The military kills 100 people in an air raid on a Taliban area in the north-west.
- 17 April -18 April – Three suicide bomb attacks occurred within the town of Kohat within the North-West Frontier Province. At least 58 people were killed in these three suicide attacks and around 86 others were injured.
- 19 April – A suicide bombing struck a marketplace within the centre of Peshawar, killing at least 25 people.

=== May ===
- 28 May – A series of co-ordinated attacks were launched on two Ahmadi mosques in Lahore by the Tehrik-i-Taliban Pakistan. At least 86 people are killed in these terrorist attacks and more than 120 others are injured.

=== June ===
- 6 June – Cyclone Phet makes landfall near Karachi before wreaking havoc in coastal Balochistan province.
- 28 June – An accidental truck blast caused by an exploding gas cylinder, kills at least 18 people and injured around 42 others within the southern Pakistani city of Hyderabad.

=== July ===
- Extensive flooding after monsoon rains. At least 1,600 people were killed.
- 1 July – Twin suicide bombings targeted a Sufi shrine at the Data Durbar Complex, in the eastern Pakistani city of Lahore. At least 50 people are killed in these twin suicide attacks and more than 200 are injured.
- 9 July – A suicide bomb attack occurs at a market within the Mohmand Agency of north-western Pakistan. At least 104 people are killed in this suicide attack and more than 120 others are injured.
- 28 July – Crash of Airblue Flight 202, killing all 152 people aboard.

=== August ===
- 3–6 August – Riots in Karachi after the assassination of MP Raza Haider.
- 13 August – President Asif Ali Zardari a curb on the traditional Independence Day in favour a more sombre response to the floods. Zardari will instead spend the day visiting the regions worst affected by flooding.
- 14 August – 12 suspected militants in North Waziristan are killed by a suspected American drone attack.
- 14 August – At least 16 people are killed following an outbreak of violence in Balochistan.
- 14 August – Prime Minister Yousaf Raza Gillani announces that as many as 20 million Pakistanis have been hit by the floods, contradicting earlier United Nations estimates of 14 million.
- 15 August – Condemnations and the promise of a government inquiry follow the lynching of two teenaged brothers, Mughees and Muneeb Butt, by a mob in Sialkot. The killings, believed to have been sparked by a mistaken belief that the brothers were robbers, was caught on film by a Dunya TV reporter and aired on all private media channels.
- 24 August – Prime Minister Yousaf Raza Gillani raises fears of disease epidemic in flood-hit areas of the country, following reports from doctors in the areas that diarrhoea and cholera were spreading.

=== September ===
- 1 September – At least 35 people are killed and more than 250 others injured, following a series of bomb attacks on a Shia Islamic procession in Lahore. The attacks, two of which were said to be from suicide bombers took place at a commemoration of the death of Ali ibn Abi Talib.
- 3 September – In a similar attack on Shia Muslims at least 50 people are killed in Quetta by a suicide bomber at a Shia rally. Responsibility is claimed by the Taliban who state that the killings were a revenge attack for the killing of a Sunni leader in 2009.
- 7 September – American actress Angelina Jolie visits flood-hit areas of the country as the UN launches a renewed appeal for aid.
- 10 September – Former leader General Pervez Musharraf announces his intention to return to Pakistan from self-imposed exile in London. He claims that he plans to establish a new political party in order to contest the 2013 elections.
- 16 September – Exiled politician Imran Farooq is found murdered near his home in exile in north London having been stabbed several times. Violence erupted in his hometown Karachi following his murder. Several shops and vehicles were set on fire however no casualties were reported. MQM called for a 10-day strike to mourn Farooq's death.
- 25 September – Four people are killed in Miranshah in a suspected American drone attack. Seven more die in the Datta Khel area of North Waziristan in a similar attack the following day.
- 25 September – The three men accused of the 2008 Danish embassy bombing in Islamabad are acquitted by a Pakistani court because of insufficient evidence. The decision is to be challenged by the prosecution in the high courts.
- 26 September – Abdul Qayum Jatoi quits as Minister of Defence Production after claiming that the Pakistan Army was involved in political assassinations, including that of Benazir Bhutto.
- 27 September – Geo TV reveals that more than one third of cabinet ministers pay no taxes whatsoever and that Prime Minister Gillani had not paid taxes for any of the three years covered by the disclosure.

=== October ===
- 1 October – Pervez Musharraf launches his new political party, the All Pakistan Muslim League, at a club in London. At the launch Musharraf apologises for the "negative actions" he took whilst in power.
- 2 October – Nine more people are killed in the North-West in the latest in a series of American drone attacks on the bases of suspected militants.
- 20 October – Political and ethnic violence erupts in Karachi resulting in 35 deaths.
- 22 October – US Secretary of State Hillary Clinton announces that the American government is to give US$2 billion in military aid.

=== November ===
- 1 November – An American drone attack kills six people in the northwest.
- 1 November – A suicide bomber kills two policemen and wounds 10 others as security forces tried to stop him from walking into their local headquarters in Swabi, 100 kilometres northwest of Islamabad.
- 3 November – Two government schools are destroyed by Taliban militants in an attack in the Mohmand area.
- 5 November – A bomb explodes in a mosque in Darra Adam Khel in North-West Pakistan, killing at least 55 people and injuring over 100. Later that same day a grenade attack on another mosque in the village of Sulemankhel near Peshawar claimed at least two lives. Both attacks occurred during daily prayer sessions.
- 5 November – 2010 Karachi Beechcraft 1900 crash
- 9 November
  - The headquarters of the Pakistan police's Criminal Investigation Department in Karachi is attacked by militants. After the attack is repulsed in a gun battle a lorry load of explosives are detonated, destroying a perimeter wall. 200 deaths and over 100 injuries are reported.
  - North-West Frontier Province is officially renamed as Khyber Pakhtunkhwa.
- 28 November – Sun Way Flight 4412 crashes.

=== December ===
- Car bombing of the Al-Zuhra mosque and maternity center.
- 24 December – Taliban militants clash with troops in the north-west. 11 soldiers and 24 militants are estimated dead.
- 25 December – Bajaur bombing a female suicide bomber kills at least 43 people in Khar near the border with Afghanistan.
- 29 December – President Asif Zardari requests crisis talks after the Muttahida Qaumi Movement opts to withdraw two of its members from the cabinet in protest at government corruption. However, the MQM insists that it does not intend to bring down the government by going into opposition.

== Government ==
- President – Asif Ali Zardari
- Prime Minister – Yousaf Raza Gillani
- Commerce Minister – Ameen Faheem
- Minister of Communications – Arbab Alamgir Khan
- Culture Minister – Khawaja Saad Rafique
- Defence Minister – Ahmad Mukhtar
- Minister of Defence Production – Rana Tanveer Hussain
- Finance Minister – Shaukat Tarin (to 22 February) then Abdul Hafeez Shaikh (from 18 March)
- Minister of Foreign Affairs – Shah Mehmood Qureshi
- Interior Minister – Rehman Malik
- Minister for States and Frontier Regions – Najmuddin Khan
- Minister for Water and Power – Raja Pervaiz Ashraf

== Sport ==
- 1 to 8 January – Shaheed Benazir Bhutto International Boxing Tournament in Karachi
- 6 January – Australia defeated Pakistan in the 3rd Test match at Bellerive Oval winning the 3-test match series 3–0.
- 9 February – Naseem Hameed clocked 11.80 seconds in 100 meter finals at South Asian Games to become the fastest woman in South Asia. This achievement was not only recognized by government bodies and private organizations but also became an inspiration to aspiring athletes particularly female athletes in the country.
- 12–28 February – The 2010 Winter Olympics are held in Vancouver, British Columbia, Canada. Pakistani involvement is limited to the men's giant slalom in which Muhammad Abbas places 79th.
- 10 March – The Pakistan Cricket Board bans former skippers, Mohammad Yousuf and Younis Khan for indefinite periods, while Shoaib Malik and Rana Naved-ul-Hasan receive one year bans, following an inquiry into the team's poor performances on the tour of Australia.
- 19–24 May – 2010 Asia Baseball Cup held in Islamabad
- June – Pakistan finish third in cricket's 2010 Asia Cup
- 14–26 August – Pakistani athletes compete at the 2010 Summer Youth Olympics. The only medal gained was silver in the boys field hockey tournament
- 28 August – With the Pakistan national cricket team in the middle of its tour of England the British tabloid newspaper The News of the World publishes allegations that Pakistani players would be willing to engineer no-balls in return for bribes as part of a gambling scam. Scotland Yard subsequently announced the arrest of agent Mazhar Majeed, who had allegedly accepted the bribes, on charges of suspicion of conspiracy to defraud bookmakers.
- 3–14 October – Pakistani athletes compete at the 2010 Commonwealth Games
  - Azhar Hussain wins a silver medal in the men's Greco-Roman wrestling 55 kg competition.
  - Hussain follows this with gold in the men's Freestyle wrestling 55 kg competition.
  - Muhammad Inam adds a second wrestling gold medal by winning the men's Freestyle 84 kg title
  - Muhammad Waseem wins a silver medal for boxing in the light flyweight division.
  - Haroon Khan, brother of WBA World Light-Welterweight Amir Khan, wins silver in the flyweight boxing competition.
- 3 November – The Pakistan Cricket Board suspends the central contracts of three players caught up in match fixing allegations, Salman Butt, Mohammad Amir and Mohammad Asif.
- 9 November – Cricketer Zulqarnain Haider is reported as having retired from the international game and sought asylum in the UK after claiming to have received death threats from match fixers. However Haider denied the claims, stating that he would return to the international arena if the Pakistani government gave him assurances over his safety.
- November – Pakistani athletes to compete at the 2010 Asian Games
  - 15 November – The men's snooker team of Imran Shehzad, Shahram Changezi and Sohail Shehzad win bronze.
  - 17 November – Ijaz Ahmed won a silver medal in Wushu at the men's 75 kg event.
  - 19 November – The women's cricket team take the gold medal in their event.
  - 21 November – Aamir Atlas Khan wins silver in the men's individual squash tournament.

== Deaths ==
- 7 January – Kamal Mahsud, Pashto language folk singer, gas leak.
- 15 January – Asim Butt, 31, Stuckist artist, suicide by hanging.
- 22 January – Shazia Masih, 12, torture victim (born 1997)
- 29 January – Zahid Sheikh, 60, Olympic silver medal-winning (1972) field hockey player.
- 5 February – Gul Hameed Bhatti, 63, journalist and editor, stroke.
- 14 April – Israr Ahmed, 77, Indian-born religious scholar, cardiac arrest.
- 30 April – Khalid Khawaja, military and intelligence officer, shot. (body found on this date)
- 31 May – Uzra Butt, 93, Indian-born actress, after long illness.
- 19 June – Anwar Chowdhry, 86, sports official, President of the International Boxing Association (1986–2006), heart attack.
- 2 August – Raza Haider, 50, politician, member of the Muttahida Qaumi Movement, shot.
- 15 September – Shama Khalid, 60, Governor of Gilgit-Baltistan (2010), cancer.
- 16 September – Imran Farooq, 50, politician, member of the Muttahida Qaumi Movement, stabbed.
- 29 September – Rao Sikandar Iqbal, 67, former Defense Minister (2002–2007), kidney failure
- 20 October – Farooq Leghari, 70, President 1993–1997, cardiac arrest
- 20 December – Aamer Bashir, 38, cricketer, cancer

== See also ==
- 2010 in Pakistani television
- List of Pakistani films of 2010
