= 2023 Khar bombing =

Suicide attack in Khyber Pakhtunkhwa, Pakistan

- Part of the insurgency in Khyber Pakhtunkhwa
- Location: 34°43′57″N 71°31′25″E; Khar, Bajaur, Pakistan
- Date: 30 July 2023; 3 years ago 4 p.m. PKT (UTC+05:00)
- Target: Jamiat Ulema-e-Islam (F)
- Attack type: Suicide bombing
- Weapon: Explosive belt
- Deaths: 63+ (Including the assailant)
- Injuries: 200+
- Perpetrator: IS-KP

On 30 July 2023, the Islamic State – Khorasan Province carried out a suicide bombing at a Jamiat Ulema-e-Islam (F) rally in Khar, Bajaur District, Khyber Pakhtunkhwa, Pakistan, killing at least 63 people and injuring nearly 200 others.

== Background ==
Jamiat Ulema-e-Islam (F) (JUI-F) is a conservative political and religious party led by Fazal-ur-Rehman. It is supportive of the Taliban government in Afghanistan. The JUI-F had been preparing for a general election after the dissolution of the National Assembly. Religious parties have attempted to use an economic crisis and former prime minister Imran Khan's arrest to their advantage.

The insurgency in Khyber Pakhtunkhwa began in 2004 and its volatility peaked in the late 2000s and early 2010s, including two suicide bombings in Khar in January and December of 2010. This civil war slowed to a low-intensity conflict in 2017. However, the region has seen an increase in terrorist activity during the 2020s, with major protests erupting against the deteriorating security situation in January 2023.

== Bombing ==
JUI-F organized a workers' convention on 30 July 2023. At around 4 p.m., when over 400 party members and supporters were present, a suicide bomber approached the stage and detonated an explosive vest. At least 63 people were killed and nearly 200 others were injured, including many children. Maulana Zia Ullah, a local leader of the JUI-F, was killed in the attack and it was the second assassination attempt on him.

On 31 July, the Islamic State – Khorasan Province (IS–KP) claimed responsibility for the suicide bombing.

== Reactions ==
The Pakistani Taliban condemned the bombing, as did Zabihullah Mujahid, a spokesperson for the Afghan Taliban government. In a message on Twitter, Mujahid wrote, "Such crimes cannot be justified in any way".

Prime Minister Shehbaz Sharif condemned the bombing and gave his condolences to the families of the victims. In a statement by his party Foreign Minister Bilawal Zardari "expressed deep sorrow over the loss of precious lives" and also said "the terrorists, their facilitators and planners need to be eliminated so that peace is established in the country". Minister of Information and Broadcasting Marriyum Aurangzeb stated on social media that "religion of terrorists is only terrorism. Ending terrorism is very important for the survival and integrity of Pakistan".

== See also ==
- List of terrorist incidents linked to Islamic State – Khorasan Province
