= Boxing at the 2010 Commonwealth Games – Flyweight =

Boxing competitions

The Flyweight class in the boxing at the 2010 Commonwealth Games competition is the second lightest class. Flyweight s were limited to those boxers weighing less than 52 kilograms (114.64 lbs).

18 boxers competed.

Like all Olympic boxing events, the competition was a straight single-elimination tournament. Both semifinal losers were awarded bronze medals, so no boxers competed again after their first loss. Bouts consisted of three rounds of three minutes each, with one-minute breaks between rounds. Punches scored only if the front of the glove made full contact with the front of the head or torso of the opponent. Five judges scored each bout; three of the judges had to signal a scoring punch within one second for the punch to score. The winner of the bout was the boxer who scored the most valid punches by the end of the bout.

== Medalists ==
Gold	Suranjoy Mayengbam; India
Silver	Benson Njangiru; Kenya
Bronze	Oteng Oteng; Botswana
Bronze	Haroon Iqbal; Pakistan

== Tournament ==
Round of 32
Sunday Elias (TAN)
Haroon Iqbal (PAK)	RSCH
Gilbert Bactora (MRI)	9
Samarasekara Dissanayake (SRI)	2

Round of 16
Camillos Kaikai (PNG)	3
Benson Njangiru (KEN)	11
Dexter Jordon (GUY)	RSC
Neo Thamahane (LES)
Micheal Conlan (NIR)	10
Jason Moloney (AUS)	+10
Oteng Oteng (BOT)	11
Johannes Simon (NAM)	0
Suranjoy Mayengbam (IND)	15
Manyo Plange (GHA)	4
Brian Mwabu (ZAM)	5
Mohd Subrie (MAS)	6
Tommy Stubbs (ENG)	1
Andrew Selby (WAL)	+1
Haroon Iqbal (PAK)	8
Gilbert Bactora (MRI)	5

Quarterfinals
Benson Njangiru (KEN)	8
Dexter Jordon (GUY)	0
Jason Moloney (AUS)	3
Oteng Oteng (BOT)	5
Suranjoy Mayengbam (IND)	9
Mohd Subrie (MAS)	2
Andrew Selby (WAL)	3
Haroon Iqbal (PAK)	+3

Semifinals
Benson Njangiru (KEN)	5
Oteng Oteng (BOT)	4
Suranjoy Mayengbam (IND)	9
Haroon Iqbal (PAK)	3

Final
Benson Njangiru (KEN)	-
Suranjoy Mayengbam (IND)	WO
