= Boxing at the 2014 Commonwealth Games – Flyweight =

Boxing competitions

Boxing – Flyweight at the 2014 Commonwealth Games
- Venue: Scottish Exhibition and Conference Centre
- Dates: 25 July – 2 August 2014
- Competitors: 19 from 19 nations

Medalists
| gold medal | Andrew Moloney | Australia |
| silver medal | Muhammad Waseem | Pakistan |
| bronze medal | Abdul Omar | Ghana |
| bronze medal | Reece McFadden | Scotland |

The Flyweight boxing competition at the 2014 Commonwealth Games in Glasgow, Scotland took place between 25 July and 2 August at the Scottish Exhibition and Conference Centre. Flyweights were limited to those boxers weighing less than 52 kilograms but weighing above 49 kilograms.

Like all Commonwealth boxing events, the competition was a straight single-elimination tournament. Both semifinal losers were awarded bronze medals, so no boxers competed again after their first loss. Bouts consisted of three rounds of three minutes each, with one-minute breaks between rounds. Punches scored only if the front of the glove made full contact with the front of the head or torso of the opponent. Tree scored each bout; the winner of the bout was the boxer who won the most rounds.

== Schedule ==
All times are British Summer Time (UTC+1)

| Date | Time | Round |
|---|---|---|
| Friday 25 July 2014 | 18:30 | Round of 32 |
| Sunday 27 July 2014 | 13:00 & 18:30 | Round of 16 |
| Tuesday 29 July 2014 | 13:00 | Quarter-finals |
| Friday 1 August 2014 | 13:00 | Semi-finals |
| Saturday 2 August 2014 | 14:05 | Final |

== Medalists ==
| Gold | Andrew Moloney; Australia |
| Silver | Muhammad Waseem; Pakistan |
| Bronze | Abdul Omar; Ghana |
| Bronze | Reece McFadden; Scotland |

== Results ==
Round of 32
Simon Mulinge Nzioki (KEN) | 2
Immanuel Shapaka (NAM) | 1
Reece McFadden (SCO) | 3
Andrew Selby (WAL) | 0
Ruairi Dalton (NIR) | 3
Christopher Katanga (ZAM) | 0

Round of 16
Moroke Mokhotho (LES) | WO
Simon Mulinge Nzioki (KEN)
Muhammad Waseem (PAK) | 3
Jaya Raman Selvakumar (MAS) | 0
Junior Kauko Raka (PNG) | 0
Abdul Omar (GHA) | 3
Anurudha Rathnayake (SRI) | 3
Rogers Semitala (UGA) | 0
Charlie Edwards (ENG) | 0
Reece McFadden (SCO) | 3
Ricardo Blackman (BAR)
Oteng Oteng (BOT) | KO2
Wasiu Taiwo (NGR) | 0
Andrew Moloney (AUS) | 3
Ruairi Dalton (NIR) | 3
Ezra Paul Mwanjwango (TAN) | 0

Quarterfinals
Moroke Mokhotho (LES) | 0
Muhammad Waseem (PAK) | 3
Abdul Omar (GHA) | 2
Anurudha Rathnayake (SRI) | 1
Reece McFadden (SCO) | 3
Oteng Oteng (BOT) | 0
Andrew Moloney (AUS) | 3
Ruairi Dalton (NIR) | 0

Semifinals
Muhammad Waseem (PAK) | 3
Abdul Omar (GHA) | 0
Reece McFadden (SCO) | 1
Andrew Moloney (AUS) | 2

Final
Muhammad Waseem (PAK) | 0
Andrew Moloney (AUS) | 3
