= Vidanalange Bandara =

Sri Lankan boxer

Personal information
- Full name: M. Vidanalange Ishan Bandara
- Born: 16 May 1991 (age 35)
- Height: 159 cm (5 ft 3 in)

Sport
- Sport: Boxing
- Event: men's flyweight
Medal record
Men's boxing
Representing Sri Lanka
Commonwealth Games
Bronze medal – third place	2018 Gold Coast	52kg

M. Vidanalange Ishan Bandara (born 16 May 1991) is a Sri Lankan male boxer who generally competes in flyweight category.

Ishan Bandara made his Commonwealth Games debut at the 2018 Commonwealth Games representing Sri Lanka and claimed a bronze medal in the men's 52kg event after losing the semi-final bout to India's Gaurav Solanki. Vidanalange Ishan Bandara became the second male boxer for Sri Lanka to claim a medal at the 2018 Commonwealth Games following Thiwanka Ranasinghe's bronze medal achievement.
