= Abdul Omar (boxer) =

Ghanaian boxer (born 1993)

Personal information
- Nationality: Ghanaian
- Born: Abdul Wahid Omar; 3 October 1993 (age 32) Accra, Ghana

Boxing career
Medal record
Men's amateur boxing
Representing Ghana
Commonwealth Games
| Bronze medal – third place | 2014 Glasgow | Flyweight |
| Bronze medal – third place | 2022 Birmingham | Light welterweight |

Abdul Wahid Omar (born 3 October 1993) is a Ghanaian boxer. He competed in the men's bantamweight event at the 2016 Summer Olympics, where he was defeated by Argentine boxer Alberto Melián in the first round.
