= Syed Manzar Imam =

Pakistani politician

Syed Manzar Imam MPA

Member of the Provincial Assembly of Sindh
- In office 2008–2013

Syed Manzar Imam was a Pakistani politician who served as a member of the Provincial Assembly of Sindh. He was killed by assassins in 2013.

He graduated from the Karachi University.

He joined MQM in 1986.

He was elected to the Provincial Assembly of Sindh in 2008 election from PS-95.

He was killed in Orangi Town, Karachi, on January 17, 2013, along with two police guards and a personal security guard when four men on motorbikes opened fire on his vehicle. The Tehreek-i-Taliban Pakistan (TTP) terrorist group had claimed responsibility for the killing.

== See also ==
- Raza Haider
