= Reece McFadden =

Scottish Boxer

Personal information
- Nickname: Fast Hands
- Nationality: Scottish
- Born: Reece John McFadden; 1 June 1995 (age 31) Bellshill, Scotland
- Height: 1.54 m (5 ft 1 in)
- Weight: Bantamweight

Boxing career
- Stance: Southpaw

Boxing record
- Total fights: 4
- Wins: 4
- Win by KO: 1
- Losses: 0
Medal record
Men's amateur boxing
Representing Scotland
Commonwealth Games
Bronze medal – third place	2014 Glasgow	Flyweight
Bronze medal – third place	2018 Gold Coast	Flyweight

Reece John McFadden (born 1 June 1995) is a Scottish professional boxer. As an amateur, he won bronze medals at both the 2014 and 2018 Commonwealth Games.

== Amateur career ==
=== Commonwealth Games results ===
Glasgow 2014

- Round of 32: Defeated Andrew Selby (Wales) 3–0
- Round of 16: Defeated Charlie Edwards (England) 3–0
- Quarter-finals: Defeated Oteng Oteng (Botswana) 3–0
- Semi-finals: Defeated by Andrew Moloney 2–1

Gold Coast 2018

- Round of 16: Defeated Keevin Allicock (Guyana) 4–1
- Quarter-finals: Defeated Syed Muhammad Asif (Pakistan) 5–0
- Semi-finals: Defeated by Brendan Irvine (Northern Ireland) 4–1

== Professional career ==
On 30 November 2018, McFadden made his professional debut against Elvis Guillen of Nicaragua. The fight went the full distance as McFadden won via comfortable points decision. On 22 March 2019, McFadden fought professionally for a second time against Stefan Sashev. He won by a technical knockout after knocking his opponent down midway through the bout before eventually halting Sashev in the final round.

McFadden's third professional fight was against Georgi Georgiev on 18 May 2019 where he secured another comfortable points victory. On 22 June 2019, McFadden maintained his unbeaten record after gaining another points victory by defeating Joel Sanchez.

== Professional boxing record ==
4 fights	4 wins	0 losses
By knockout	1	0
By decision	3	0

No.	Result	Record	Opponent	Type	Round, time	Date	Location	Notes
4	Win	4–0	(Nicaragua) Joel Sanchez	PTS	6	22 Jun 2019	(United Kingdom) Emirates Arena, Glasgow, Scotland	
3	Win	3–0	(Bulgaria) Georgi Georgiev	PTS	4	18 May 2019	(United Kingdom) SSE Hydro, Glasgow, Scotland	
2	Win	2–0	(Bulgaria) Stefan Sashev	TKO	4 (4), 2:15	22 Mar 2019	(United Kingdom) Emirates Arena, Glasgow, Scotland	
1	Win	1–0	(Nicaragua) Elvis Guillen	PTS	4	30 Nov 2018	(United Kingdom) Emirates Arena, Glasgow, Scotland	
