= February 2010 Khyber mosque bombing =

Terrorist incident in Pakistan

February 2010 Khyber Mosque bombing
- Part of War in North-West Pakistan
- Location of Federally Administered Tribal Areas in Pakistan
- Location: Dars village, Tirah, Khyber Agency, Federally Administered Tribal Areas, Pakistan
- Date: 18 February 2010
- Deaths: 30
- Injuries: 70

The February 2010 Khyber mosque bombing occurred at a mosque in Dars village in Tirah Valley of Khyber Agency in Pakistan on 18 February 2010. At least 30 people died and more than 70 were injured.

== Attack ==
The blast occurred at a mosque which was used by members of banned militant group Lashkar-e-Islam. The bombing appeared to target a leader of the pro Taliban group and happened next to a market selling Hashish.

== Aftermath ==
The blast was condemned by Pakistan's Prime Minister Yousaf Raza Gilani. The bombing was thought to be result of a feud between rival militant groups.

== See also ==
- List of terrorist incidents, 2010
- List of terrorist incidents in Pakistan since 2001
