= February 2010 Karachi bombings =

Terrorist incident in Pakistan

- Part of War in North-West Pakistan
- Location of Sindh in Pakistan
- Location: Karachi, Sindh, Pakistan
- Date: 5 February 2010
- Deaths: 25
- Injuries: 50

The February 2010 Karachi bombings were a series of two bombings in Karachi in Pakistan on 5 February 2010. At least 25 people died and more than 50 were injured. The attacks which targeted Shia Muslims happened on Arba'een, a religious observation that occurs 40 days after the Day of Ashura.

== Attacks ==
The first bombing occurred when a suicide bomber on a motorcycle laden with explosives hit a bus carrying Shia pilgrims. Twelve people died. The bomb disposal squad said that the bike rider was wearing a suicide jacket with 15-20kg of explosives. About an hour later, another blast occurred just outside the emergency ward of Jinnah hospital where many victims from the first blast were being cared for. At least 10 were killed in this blast.

== See also ==
- List of terrorist incidents, 2010
- List of terrorist incidents in Pakistan since 2001
- Sectarian violence in Pakistan
