= February 2010 Khyber bombing =

Suicide bombing

- Part of War in North-West Pakistan
- Location of Federally Administered Tribal Areas in Pakistan
- Location: Khyber Agency, Federally Administered Tribal Areas, Pakistan
- Date: 10 February 2010
- Deaths: 19

The February 2010 Khyber bombing was a suicide bombing in Khyber Agency in Pakistan, on February 10, 2010. At least 19 people including 13 policemen were killed in a suicide bomb attack against a police patrol.

== Background ==
Khyber Agency is located in Northwest Pakistan. It is on the main supply route for NATO forces stationed in Afghanistan. It has seen several militant attacks against convoys carrying supplies in the past.

== Attack ==
According to officials a local police officer Zurmat Khan appeared to be the target of the attack. Zurmat Khan had been nominated for a gallantry award Tamgha-i-Jurat which was to have been given on March 23. He had been previously awarded Rs 350,000 for his bravery in a prior operation against Taliban. He was leading a patrol when the suicide bomber ran towards his vehicle and detonated himself. Militants had earlier attacked his home, but no one was injured in that attack. The attack happened on the road NATO uses to supply troops in Afghanistan.

== Aftermath ==
No group has yet claimed responsibility for this attack. A senior police officer in Peshawar stated the most likely the bombing was carried out by Taliban in retaliation for killing of Hakimullah Mehsud. Altaf Hussain chief of Muttahida Qaumi Movement strongly condemned the blast and expressed his grief. Rehmatullah Kakar Pakistan's Minister for Housing and Works also condemned the attack

== See also ==
- List of terrorist incidents, 2010
- List of terrorist incidents in Pakistan since 2001
