= Boxing at the 2018 Commonwealth Games – Men's flyweight =

Boxing competitions

Boxing – Men's flyweight at the 2018 Commonwealth Games
- Venue: Oxenford Studios
- Dates: 9 – 14 April 2018
- Competitors: 14 from 14 nations

Medalists
gold medal	Gaurav Solanki	India
silver medal	Brendan Irvine	Northern Ireland
bronze medal	Reece McFadden	Scotland
bronze medal	Vidanalange Bandara	Sri Lanka

The men's flyweight boxing competitions at the 2018 Commonwealth Games in Gold Coast, Australia took place between 9 and 14 April at Oxenford Studios. Flyweights were limited to those boxers weighing less than 52 kilograms.

Like all Commonwealth boxing events, the competition was a straight single-elimination tournament. Both semifinal losers were awarded bronze medals, so no boxers competed again after their first loss. Bouts consisted of three rounds of three minutes each, with one-minute breaks between rounds. Beginning this year, the competition was scored using the "must-ten" scoring system.

== Schedule ==
The schedule is as follows:

All times are Australian Eastern Standard Time (UTC+10)

Date	Time	Round
Monday 9 April 2018	12:02 & 18:32	Round of 16
Wednesday 11 April 2018	12:02	Quarter-finals
Friday 13 April 2018	12:32	Semi-finals
Saturday 14 April 2018	12:17	Final

== Results ==
The draw is as follows:

Round of 16
Gaurav Solanki (IND)	5
Akimos Ampiah (GHA)	0
Thabo Molefe (LES)	5
Gill Kalai (VAN)	0
Vidanalange Bandara (SRI)	3
Yachen Cook (NRU)	2
Brian Agina (KEN)	1
Syed Muhammad Asif (PAK)	4
Reece McFadden (SCO)	4
Keevin Allicock (GUY)	1
Jabali Breedy (BAR)	0
Brendan Irvine (NIR)	5

Quarterfinals
Charles Keama (PNG)	0
Gaurav Solanki (IND)	5
Thabo Molefe (LES)	1
Vidanalange Bandara (SRI)	4
Syed Muhammad Asif (PAK)	0
Reece McFadden (SCO)	5
Brendan Irvine (NIR)	4
Rajab Mahommed (BOT)	1

Semifinals
Gaurav Solanki (IND)	4
Vidanalange Bandara (SRI)	0
Reece McFadden (SCO)	1
Brendan Irvine (NIR)	4

Final
Gaurav Solanki (IND)	4
Brendan Irvine (NIR)	1
