= Muhammad Waseem =

Pakistani boxer

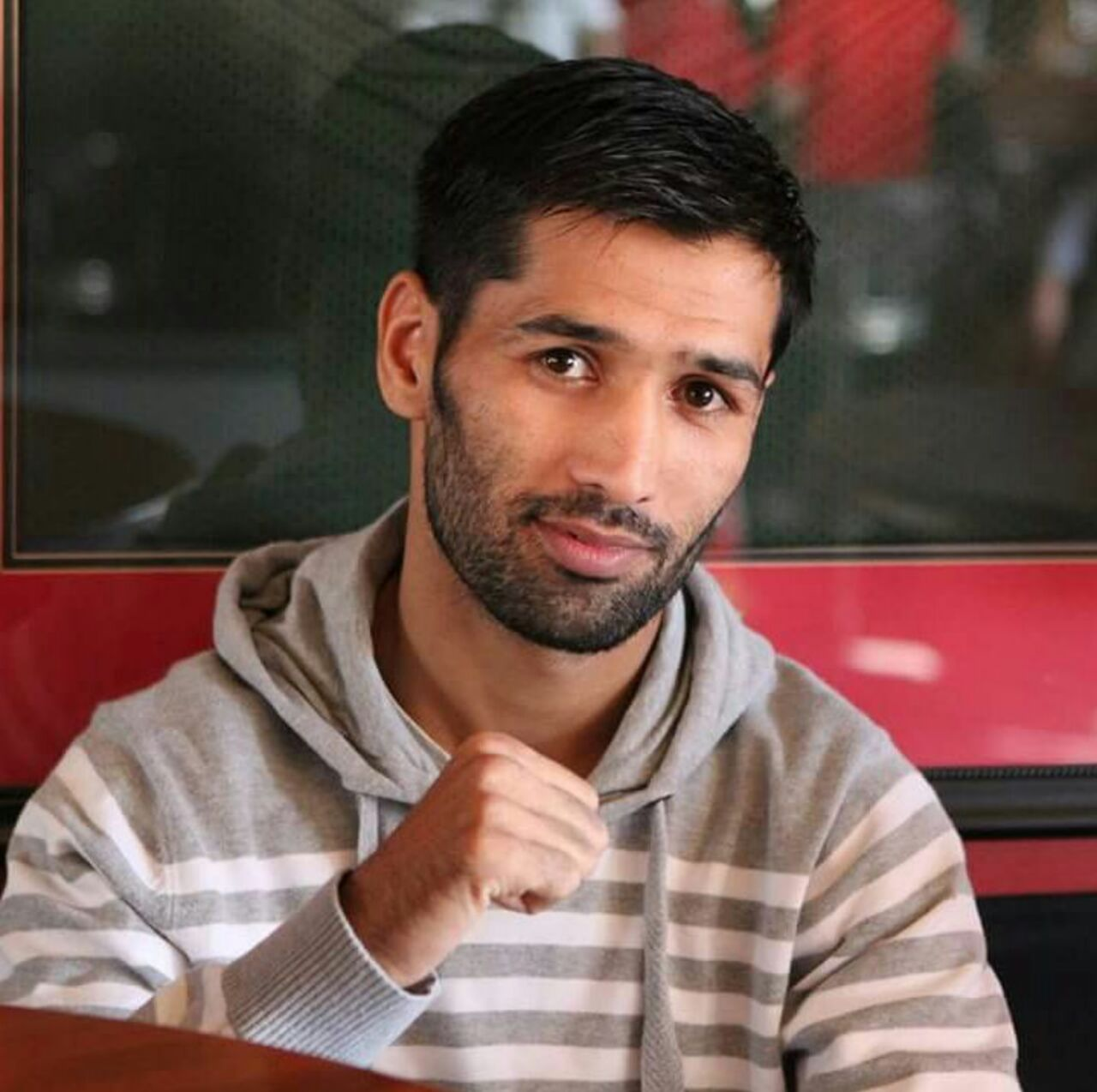

Personal information
- Nickname: Falcon
- Born: 29 August 1987 (age 39) Quetta, Pakistan
- Height: 5 ft 6 in (168 cm)
- Weight: Flyweight; Bantamweight

Boxing career
- Reach: 66 1/2 in (169 cm)
- Stance: Orthodox

Boxing record
- Total fights: 17
- Wins: 15
- Win by KO: 10
- Losses: 2
Medal record
Men's amateur boxing
Representing Pakistan
Asian Games
Bronze medal – third place	2014 Incheon	Flyweight
Commonwealth Games
Silver medal – second place	2014 Glasgow	Flyweight
Bronze medal – third place	2010 Delhi	Light-flyweight
World Combat Games
Gold medal – first place	2010 Beijing	Flyweight
South Asian Games
Silver medal – second place	2010 Dhaka	Flyweight

Muhammad Waseem (born 29 December 1989) is a Pakistani professional boxer who challenged twice for the International Boxing Federation (IBF) flyweight title in 2018 and in 2022. Known for his quick and swift style of boxing, Waseem is nicknamed "Falcon".

== Early life ==
Muhammad Waseem was born in Quetta city of Balochistan, Pakistan. He belongs to the Alizai tribe of Pashtuns with his roots in Mastung. He can speak his native Pashto, Urdu, Balochi and Persian.

== Career ==
In 2012, Muhammad Waseem was chosen to be AIBA professional (APB), however his participation failed to be confirmed, to which he stated;

"I don't know what went wrong. The federation was dealing with the matter and then nothing evolved out of it, which is really disappointing. I wanted to take on the best boxers of the world but my dream was shattered..." Muhammad Waseem lost a decision when he challenged Moruti Mthalane in 2018 for the IBF belt. Waseem has recently signed a contract with MTK Global who are guiding his career from now on.

== Amateur career ==
2010 Commonwealth Games

He has represented Pakistan at the 2010 Commonwealth Games in New Delhi, India and won boxing-bronze.

2009 Kings Cup

Muhammad Waseem was given the bronze medal in Kings Cup, Bangkok, Thailand 2009. In the quarterfinal he defeated Singapore's Saleh Mohammad in a one-sided match by 26–6.

2010 Asian Games

At the 2010 Asian Games defeated Iran's Masoud Rigi in the round of 32.

2010 World Combat Games

He was the winner of the gold medal in World Combat Games 2010 China where he defeated Dagoberto Aguero of the Dominican Republic in the final.

2010 AHMET CÖMERT Boxing Tournament

In the 24th International AHMET CÖMERT Boxing Tournament Waseem won the bronze medal in Istanbul, Turkey, 2010. In the quarterfinal, Waseem overcame his Turkish opponent, Cagdas Yikilmaz, by 14–1, but in the semifinal Waseem was defeated by Ukrainian boxer Olexandr Grishchuk 8–2 and ended up with the bronze medal.

2010 South Asian Games

Muhammad Waseem was awarded the silver medal in 11th South Asian Games, Dhaka Bangladesh, 2010. In the final, Muhammad Waseem was defeated by his Indian opponent, Suranjoy Singh, in the 51 kg flyweight. Earlier in semi-final, Muhammad Waseem won the bout against Bhutan's opponent, Kinley, by 12–5.

2011 President Cup

Muhammad Waseem was awarded the bronze medal in 21st President Cup – Jakarta, Indonesia 2011. He defeated Iran's Reza Korzbori by 22:6 in per-quarter final. In the quarterfinal he defeated Mohamed Hanureeh Hamid of Singapore by 16:6. In the semi-final, he was defeated by Katsuaki Susa of Japan by 25:19.

2011 Shaheed Benazir Bhutto International Boxing Tournament

Muhammad Waseem was awarded the gold medal in 2nd Shaheed Benazir Bhutto International Boxing Tournament, Islamabad, 2011 and was also declared the best boxer of the Competition. In Final Waseem Crushed his Kenyan rival Benson Gicharu by 26–9.

2014 Commonwealth Games

Muhammad Waseem represented Pakistan in 2014 Commonwealth Games in Glasgow, Scotland. Waseem became the only player of Pakistan's Boxing team who qualified for the final for Flyweight category. He became the silver medalist after a close fight with Moloney from Australia.

2014 Asian Games

Waseem won the bronze medal at the 2014 Asian Games.

== Amateur boxing highlights ==
Muhammad Waseem has won many National Competitions and has been undefeated for more than 7 years creating history in Pakistan Boxing. Muhammad Waseem has been nominated for WSB (World Series Boxing) to represent Pakistan from 2010 to 2015, but was denied by PBF each time. His amateur record was 89–16.

== Professional boxing ==
=== Early career ===
Muhammad Waseem turned professional in June 2015 and signed the contract with Korean Promoter Andy Kim at AK Promotion. In his first professional fight, he won the vacant South Korea bantamweight title against Min Wook Lee (2-0) of South Korea by knocking him down in 9th round on 4 October 2015.

In his second professional fight he fought Indonesian boxer Suparyanto Doglo (7-2-1, 4 KOs). Waseem knocked him down with a strong body shot and won the fight in the third round of the scheduled 10 round fight. On 19 March 2016, Waseem fought the experienced John Bajawa at the Myoung Boxing World in Seoul, South Korea. Waseem Knocked down Bajawa in 6th round with a strong body shot and won the fight.

On 17 July 2016, Waseem made history against Jether Oliva (25-5-2, 11 KOs). Waseem prepared in TMT (The Money Team) in Las Vegas for this fight. Prior to his training in Las Vegas, he trained in Japan with his Japanese trainer. Waseem trained in TMT (The Money Team) gym headed by Floyd Mayweather Jr. for two months, under Jeff Mayweather (Floyd's uncle). Waseem defeated Oliva via unanimous decision when all three judges scored the fight in his favour 119–112, 120–108, 120-108 and became the first Pakistani to win the WBC Silver flyweight title. Waseem made his first defence of his WBC Silver title on 27 November 2016 at the Gwanakgu Hall in Seoul. His opponent was undefeated 22-year-old Giemel Magramo (17-0, 13 KOs). The fight went the 12 round distance. Judge Jun Bae Lim scored the bout wide 117-110 for Waseem and judges Jerrold Tomeldan and Noppharat Sricharoen scored the fight close 114-113 for Waseem, giving him a unanimous decision win. Magramo was deducted a point in round 6 for an accidental headbutt that caused a cut on Waseem. Had he not been deducted a point, the fight would have ended in a majority draw.

After becoming the number 1 mandatory for the WBC flyweight title, Waseem traveled to Panama in June 2017 with trainer Jeff Mayweather, to fight native Eliecer Valdez in a 6-round non-title fight. The fight took place on 5 July. The card also included former world champion Luis Concepcion. Waseem knocked out Valdez in round 2, registering his fourth knockout win of his professional career. Waseem fought for the second time in the space of a month on 29 July at the Gimnasio Municipal in Puerto Armuelles, Panama and knocked out Ivan Trejos (7-7-2, 1 KO) in the third round of a scheduled 8 round fight. Waseem next fought on 30 September, once again in Panama against Jose Luis Calvo (3-8-3). The fight ended in round 1 with Waseem being victorious, retaining his number 1 position in the WBC rankings. According to his manager Andy Kim, Waseem would possibly take on WBC champion Daigo Higa in a mandatory title fight, likely in Japan in January 2018.

=== World title challenge ===
On 9 April 2018, The Ring Magazine reported that Waseem would fight former IBF world champion Moruti Mthalane (35-2, 24 KOs) on the Manny Pacquiao vs. Lucas Mattyhsse undercard on 15 July in Kuala Lumpur, Malaysia for the vacant IBF flyweight title. Mthalane was the IBF king from 2009 to 2014, recording stoppage wins over Zolani Tete and Johnriel Casimero. The fight was originally scheduled to be an eliminator, until Donnie Nietes (41-1-4, 23 KOs) vacated on 11 April in order to make a full move to super flyweight. Speaking about the last year, Waseem said, "It has been a roller-coaster ride. I had troubles even after getting Pakistan the first WBC title, but I didn’t give up. And now this is my big chance, if it’s not the WBC title then it will be the IBF title." Waseem would become the first Pakistani boxer to challenge for an IBF world title. Waseem lost to Mthalane via unanimous decision thus failing to capture his first world title. Waseem dropped Mthalana with a powerful left hand in round 11 just as the round was coming to and end. Mthalane beat the count as the round ended. Mthlane controlled the bout from the start winning the early rounds by outworking Waseem. Waseem gave away most of the early rounds feeling out Mthalane. The fight changed in round 6 due to Waseem throwing and landing more shots. Mthalane came back strong in round 7. Between rounds 8 and 10, both boxers continued to trade, turning the fight into a near slugfest. Waseem came out strong in round 12 throwing many shots, likely knowing he may need a stoppage to win the bout. Mthalane took the shots well and began throwing shots of his own. Waseem absorbed the shots and began trading again. Despite Waseem rocking Mthalane in the closing stage, Mthalane managed to finish the bout standing. The three judges scored the bout 114–113, 114-113 and 116–110 in favour of Mthalane.

=== 2019 ===
On 22 November 2019, Waseem won a fight against Ganigan López at Caesars Palace, United Arab Emirates. This was Waseem's 11th professional career bout.

On 19 December 2020, Waseem fought Jenny Boy Boca in his first professional bout in his home country of Pakistan. This fight was sanctioned by the Pakistan Boxing Council and promoted by AK Promotion by Amir Khan. Waseem dominated convincingly in each round, and the bout ended with him securing a TKO victory in the eighth round, much to the delight of the home crowd.

== Professional boxing record ==
17 fights	15 wins	2 losses
By knockout	10	0
By decision	5	2

No.	Result	Record	Opponent	Type	Round, time	Date	Location	Notes
17	Win	15–2	Kongfah CP Freshmart	UD	12	29 November 2025	MISA Cannt Lahore, Lahore, Pakistan	Retained WBA Gold bantamweight title
16	Win	14–2	Wiston Orono	KO	9 (12) 1:37	10 May 2025	Quetta Polo Club, Quetta, Pakistan	Won vacant WBA Gold bantamweight title
15	Win	13–2	Jaba Memishishi	TKO	3 (6) 0:56	4 Oct 2024	Hotel Intercontinental, St. Julian's, Malta	
14	Loss	12–2	Sunny Edwards	UD	12	19 Mar 2022	Aviation Club Tennis Centre, Dubai, United Arab Emirates	For IBF flyweight title
13	Win	12–1	Rober Barrera	UD	12	26 Nov 2021	Caesars Palace, Dubai, United Arab Emirates	Won vacant WBC Silver flyweight title
12	Win	11–1	Jenny Boy Boca	TKO	8 (10) 1:49	19 Dec 2020	Governor House, Lahore, Pakistan	
11	Win	10–1	Ganigan López	UD	8	22 Nov 2019	Caesars Palace, Dubai, United Arab Emirates	
10	Win	9–1	Conrado Tanamor	KO	1 (8), 1:02	13 Sep 2019	Caesars Palace, Dubai, United Arab Emirates	
9	Loss	8–1	Moruti Mthalane	UD	12	15 Jul 2018	Axiata Arena, Kuala Lumpur, Malaysia	For vacant IBF flyweight title
8	Win	8–0	José Luis Calvo	TKO	1 (6), 1:57	30 Sep 2017	Gimnasio Pandeportes-La Basita, David, Panama	
7	Win	7–0	Ivan Trejos	TKO	3 (8), 0:59	29 Jul 2017	Gimnasio Municipal, Puerto Armuelles, Panama	
6	Win	6–0	Eliecer Valdez	KO	2 (6), 2:24	5 Jul 2017	Fantastic Casino de Albrook Mall, Panama City, Panama	
5	Win	5–0	Giemel Magramo	UD	12	27 Nov 2016	Gwanakgu Hall, Seoul, South Korea	Retained WBC Silver flyweight title
4	Win	4–0	Jether Oliva	UD	12	19 Jul 2016	Millennium Hilton, Seoul, South Korea	Won vacant WBC Silver flyweight title
3	Win	3–0	John Bajawa	TKO	6 (8), 2:10	19 Mar 2016	Myoung Boxing World, Seoul, South Korea	
2	Win	2–0	Suparyanto Doglo	KO	3 (10), 1:15	5 Dec 2015	Royal Square, Bangkok, Thailand	
1	Win	1–0	Min Wook Lee	TKO	9 (10), 1:37	4 Oct 2015	Sunhak Gymnasium, Incheon, South Korea	Won vacant South Korea bantamweight title
