= Gaurav Solanki =

Indian boxer

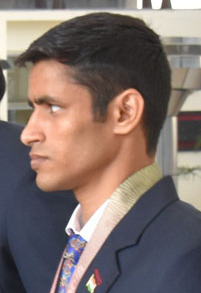

Personal information
- Nationality: Indian
- Born: 21 January 1997 (age 29) Ballabgarh, Haryana, India
- Height: 172 cm (5 ft 8 in)
- Weight: Flyweight

Boxing career
Medal record
Men's amateur boxing
Representing India
Commonwealth Games
Gold medal – first place	2018 Gold Coast	Flyweight

Gaurav Solanki (born 21 January 1997) is an Indian boxer. He competes in the 52 kg category. In the year 2018, at the Commonwealth Games held in Gold Coast, Queensland, he won the gold medal in boxing's flyweight 52 kg category. He hails from Ballabgarh, Faridabad, Haryana.

== Primary and personal life ==
Gaurav Solanki was born on 21 January 1997 in Ballabgarh of Faridabad district. His father, Vijay Pal Singh, is an electrician and has an electric shop. His younger brother, Saurav is a boxer and trains at a local boxing academy in the 46–49 kg category. Her elder sister, Neelam was the national level boxing champion from 2013 to 2015.

In Ballabgarh village, there was a lack of sports culture and very few people came forward to inspire Gaurav to pursue boxing. His school started boxing training as a sport and in order to have fun Gaurav joined, and soon boxing became his profession. Though in the initial days, there was a big problem in his family finances, i.e., in order to be a good boxer one needs enough financial support to have good food and training. In 2012, when Gaurav started showing the spark of becoming a boxer, his father sold his 50-yard land to financially support Gaurav's boxing career. So, when Gaurav decided to become a boxer, his family came forward to help him in every possible way so he could pursue his dream without giving him a hint of the financial crisis of the family.

== Career ==
=== 2018, Commonwealth Games, Gold Coast, Australia ===
- On 9 April 2018, in the last 16 rounds, Gaurav beat Ghana's Empiyar Akimos Annang Ampiah with a score of 4–0.
- On 11 April 2018, in the quarter-finals, Gaurav beat Papua New Guinea's Charles Keama with a score of 5–0.
- On 13 April 2018, in the semifinals Gaurav beat Sri Lankan M. Vidanalange Ishan Bandra with a score of 4–0 margin.
- On 14 April, in the final, Gaurav beat Ireland's Brendan Irvine with a final score of 4–1.

After the bout, the final scores made by five judges were 29–28, 30–25, 29–28, 28–29, 29–28, giving the gold medal in the Flyweight 52 kg category of male boxing event to Gaurav and making him the first Indian male boxer to win a gold medal in the 2018 Commonwealth Games. After winning the gold medal, he said, "Today I am dedicating my medal to my mother and I want to represent Tokyo Olympics 2020 and I want to stay there when the Indian flag is raised."
