= Haroon Khan (boxer) =

British professional boxer

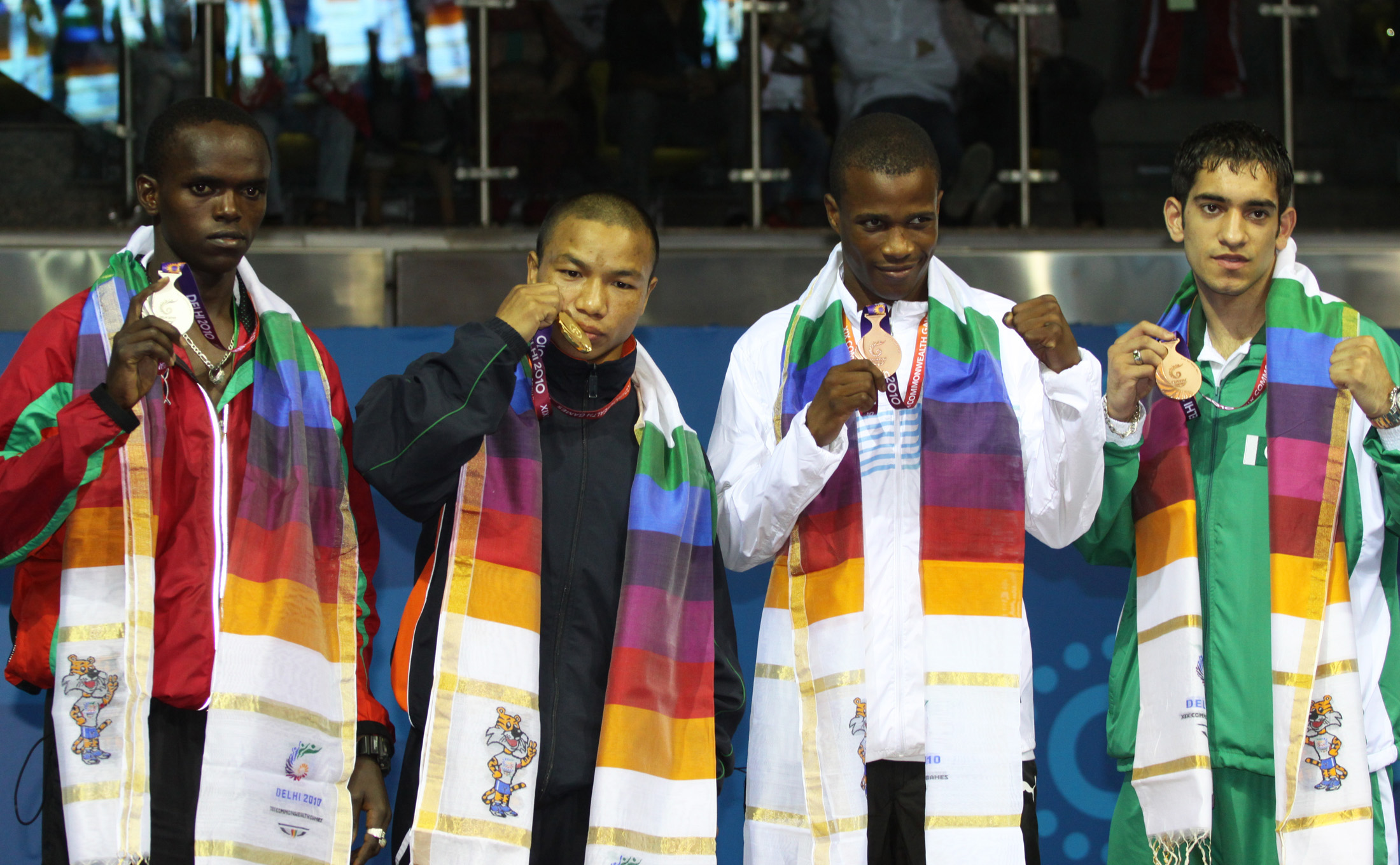
- Haroon Iqbal (far right) at the 2010 Commonwealth Games

Personal information
- Nickname: King
- Born: Haroon Khan; 10 May 1991 (age 35) Bolton, England
- Height: 168 cm (5 ft 6 in)
- Weight: Super flyweight

Boxing career
- Stance: Orthodox

Boxing record
- Total fights: 7
- Wins: 7
- Win by KO: 3
- Losses: 0
Medal record
Representing Pakistan
Commonwealth Games
Bronze medal – third place	2010 Delhi	Flyweight

Haroon Iqbal Khan (born 10 May 1991) is a British professional boxer, and Commonwealth Games Bronze medallist.

== Personal life ==
Khan was born in Bolton, England, to a Pakistani Punjabi family with roots in Rawalpindi, Pakistan.

He is the younger brother of former WBA and IBF World Light Welterweight Champion Amir Khan and is the first cousin of British cricketer Sajid Mahmood, related through a Paternal grandfather, Lall Khan, who came to England after being discharged from the Pakistan Army.

Prior to boxing, Khan played football for his local club before the club was eventually shut down. Khan supports his local football team Bolton Wanderers and he also enjoys Indian Premier League cricket. His all-time favorite boxer is Oscar De La Hoya.

In 2016, Khan married Arifa Janjua in Rawalpindi, Pakistan. Khan and Janjua then flew back to Bolton where their Walima took place.

== Amateur career ==
Khan took up boxing through watching his older brother prevail at the sport as a youngster, as an amateur, he fought in the Bantamweight class where he held 66 wins and 19 losses. Khan has previously won the Junior ABA Championships once and Junior Four Nations Challenge twice.

=== 2010 Commonwealth Games ===
The highlight of his Amateur career came when he qualified for the 2010 Commonwealth Games in New Delhi following a defeat over Tanzanian boxer Sunday Elias with a blow to the head in the third round.

Khan chose to represent Pakistan after being overlooked by the Team GB selectors in favor of Andrew Selby, who he went on to beat in the quarter-finals, and was thus guaranteed a medal before losing out to the eventual gold medalist, Indian boxer Suranjoy Singh. He became one of two Pakistanis to win a bronze-medal for boxing in the 2010 Commonwealth Games, the other being Muhammad Waseem.

=== 2012 Olympics ban ===
Khan was banned by the International Boxing Association (AIBA) from representing Pakistan in World Amateur Boxing Championships, a qualifier to the 2012 Olympics, as he prepared for the tournament because he had represented for England as a youth even though he gained Pakistani citizenship in 2010. His father tried to appeal the ban but failed to have it lifted.

== Professional career ==
=== Super flyweight ===
Khan debuted at super flyweight, and was coached by Oliver Harrison, his elder brother Amir Khan's former coach.

== Professional boxing record ==
7 wins (3 knockouts, 4 decisions), 0 losses (0 knockouts, 0 decisions), 0 draws
Res.	Record	Opponent	Type	Rd.	Date	Location	Notes
Win	7-0	(Hungary) Gyula Dodu	KO	2	2017-14-10	(United Kingdom) Robin Park Center, Wigan, Greater Manchester	
Win	6-0	(Czech Republic) Patrik Bartos	TKO	1	2017-19-05	(United Kingdom) Bolton Whites Hotel (formerly De Vere Whites), Bolton, Greater Manchester	
Win	5–0	(Hungary) Csaba Kovacs	PTS	6	2014-06-07	(United Kingdom) De Vere Whites, Reebok Stadium, Bolton, Greater Manchester	
Win	4–0	(United Kingdom) Francis Croes	PTS	4	2014-02-07	(United Kingdom) Ice Sheffield, Coleridge Road, Sheffield, Yorkshire	
Win	3–0	(Bulgaria) Stefan Slavchev	PTS	4	2013-11-15	(United Kingdom) Winter Gardens, Blackpool, Lancashire	
Win	2–0	(United States) Vincente Medellin	TKO	1	2013-05-19	(United States) Boardwalk Hall, Atlantic City, New Jersey	American Debut
Win	1–0	(United Kingdom) Brett Fidoe	PTS	4	2013-04-27	(United Kingdom) Motorpoint Arena, Sheffield, Yorkshire	Professional Debut

== Awards ==
In January 2014, he was awarded the Best at Sport award at the British Muslim Awards.

== See also ==
- Amir Khan
- British Pakistanis
