= Khar, Punjab =

Khar
- Location within Pakistan
- Coordinates: 30.15°N 71.1°E
- Country: Pakistan
- Province: Punjab
- Elevation: 117 m (384 ft)
- Time zone: UTC+5 (PST)

Khar is a town of Muzaffargarh District in the Punjab province of Pakistan. It is located at 30°15'30N 71°1'30E with an altitude of 117 metres (387 feet).
