= Raza Haider =

Pakistani politician

Raza Haider MPA

Member of the Provincial Assembly of Sindh
- In office 2008–2010

Raza Haider was a Pakistani politician who served as a member of the Provincial Assembly of Sindh in Pakistan. He was killed by assassins in Nazimabad, a suburb of Karachi on 2 August 2010, while attending a funeral.

== See also ==
- Syed Manzar Imam
