= 2010 Mitrovica attacks =

2010 Mitrovica attack
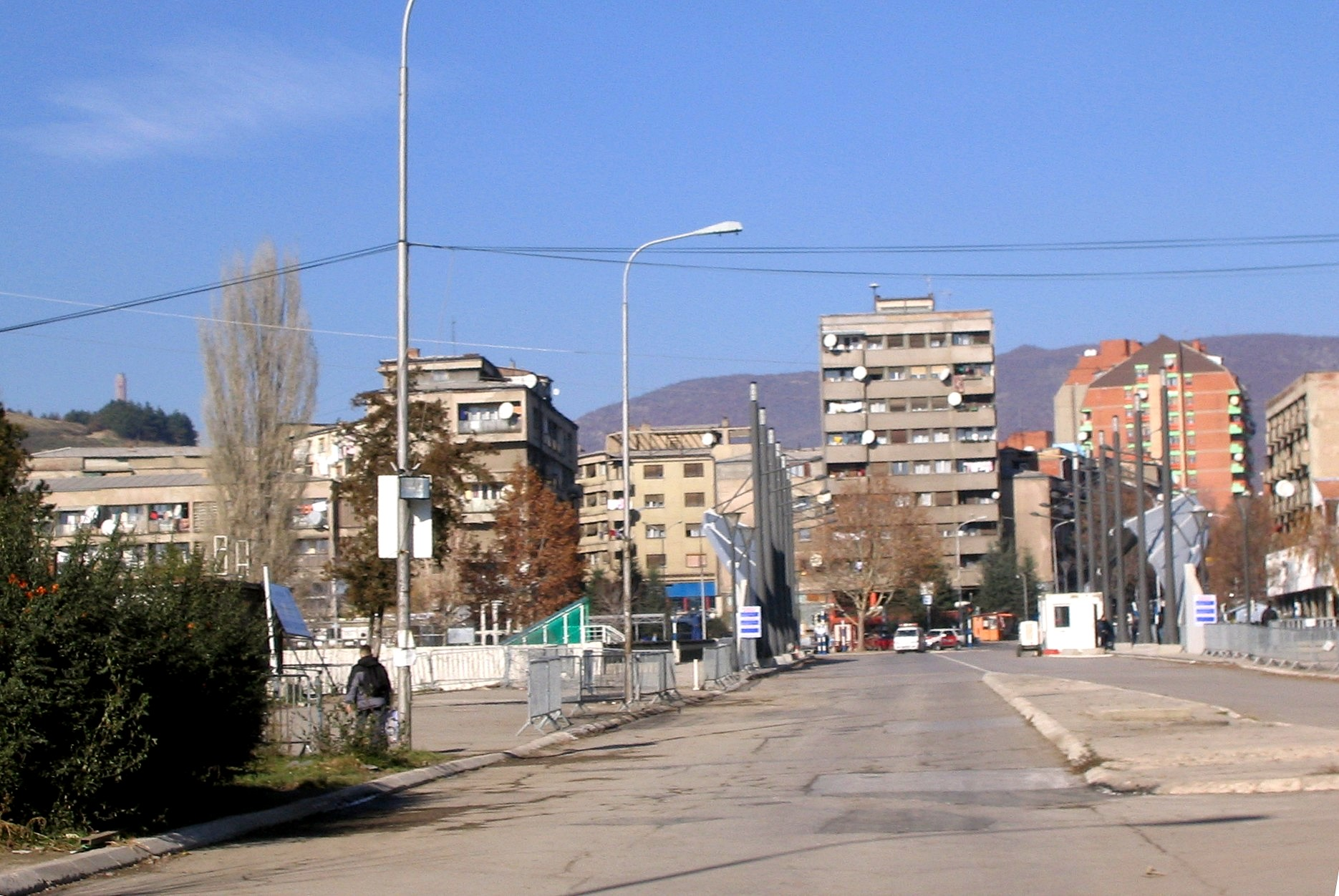
- The New Bridge, dividing the city
- Location: North Mitrovica, Kosovo
- Date: July 2, 2010
- Target: Kosovo Serbs
- Attack type: Explosive device
- Deaths: 1
- Injuries: 11
- Perpetrator: unknown

A number of incidents occurred on July 2, September 11 and September 28, 2010 in North Mitrovica, a town in the Mitrovica District of Kosovo.

== July 2 ==
An explosive device was thrown into a group of Kosovo Serbs who were protesting against the Government's intention to open a governmental office in the area, where Kosovo Serbs live. 1 person was killed and 11 were injured. Both Kosovan and Serbian authorities condemned the attack. At the moment there are no suspects. July 3 was declared a day of mourning by North Kosovan municipality Leaders in North Mitrovica, Zvečan, Leposavić and Zubin Potok.

Serbian Prime Minister Mirko Cvetković stated that violence in Mitrovica represents a terrorist attack.

== September 11 ==
Following the quarterfinals of the World Basketball Championship where Turkey beat Serbia, a fighting occurred between Kosovo Albanians and Kosovo Serbs. One Serb youth was shot and wounded in the arm by an EULEX police officer, three other lightly, a total of 7 were injured including an EULEX soldier.

== September 28 ==
An explosion device of 200 grams of TNT destroyed a cell site of a mobile carrier that services Albanians. A 3-year old Serb girl was injured, not life-threatening. The roof space was rented out by a local Serb working for the Kosovo police. EULEX and KFOR arrived at the scene and blocked North Mitrovica.

== See also ==
- North Kosovo
