= 2010 Kohistan avalanche =

Coordinates: 35.25°N 73.5°E

The 2010 Kohistan avalanche occurred in the Kohistan District, North West Frontier Province, Pakistan on February 17, 2010, striking the village of Bagaro Serai and killing at least 38 people.

== Incident ==
The avalanche came down on at least four houses in the remote village, which had been struck by heavy snow storms in recent days. According to local officials, rescue teams faced difficulties getting to the village as all the roads were blocked due to the avalanche and further landslides. Police and volunteers had to hike through the night to reach the scene of the avalanche, with the police facing communication problems as radio reception was hampered by the mountainous terrain. A search for stranded people was conducted and a request made to dispatch a helicopter and heavy machinery to the village to assist in the rescue operation.

== Response ==
Prime Minister Yousaf Raza Gilani expressed his grief and sorrow for the loss of lives and the destruction of properties caused by the avalanche. He has directed authorities to speed up the rescue operation and the safe evacuation of trapped people in the village.
