= December 2010 Khar bombing =

Terrorist incident in Pakistan

Coordinates: 34°41′01″N 71°30′25″E

- Location: Khar, Bajaur (FATA), Pakistan
- Date: 25 December 2010
- Attack type: Suicide bombing
- Deaths: 47
- Injuries: 100+
- Perpetrator: Taliban

On 25 December 2010, at least 47 people were killed and over 100 others injured, after a female suicide bomber detonated her explosives in a large crowd of people displaced by fighting, who were collecting food at a distribution centre of the World Food Programme in the Pakistani town of Khar, which is located within the Bajaur tribal region, of north-western Pakistan.

== History ==
It was later reported by witnesses, that the bomber dressed in a full-length burka had reportedly thrown a grenade after resisting search, to which then the bomber proceeded to detonate her explosives. Several police officials confirmed the bomber was a woman, as opposed to the more likely occurrence of a man wearing the burka as a disguise, in order to successfully conduct this suicide attack.

It was also known that those in this crowd were predominantly displaced members of the Salarzai Tribe, which has supported Pakistan Army operations against the Pakistani Taliban within the Bajaur tribal regions. Those dozens of people injured in this suicide attack were apparently later taken to local hospitals via means of helicopters. Local Witnesses, including that of a government official at the main government hospital within the region, Dosti Rehman, claimed that he had personally counted some 40 bodies.

However, there are concerns that the death toll could very likely rise, as the official stated that several of those injured, as a result of this suicide attack were apparently in critical condition at the local hospitals. This particular bombing acts as one of a string of recent suicide attacks, which have occurred with near impunity, predominantly throughout Pakistan's north-western, Khyber Pakhtunkhwa Province, of north-western Pakistan. No particular militant group has yet claimed responsibility for this suicide attack, although the Pakistani Taliban are strong suspects. The Bajaur tribal region has reportedly seen several Pakistan Army military operations in recent years, however, such suicide attacks still continue throughout the region with near impunity.

The Pakistani Prime Minister, Yousaf Raza Gillani later condemned this suicide attack, and claimed that such military offensives would continue against the Pakistani Taliban. This statement will be met with a certain degree of approval in the U.S., as Pakistan has recently been pressured to launch a major ground offensive in the nearby North Waziristan tribal region, in order to root out and destroy the last major remaining safe-haven for Radical Islamist and Pakistani Taliban insurgents within the country. The UN World Food Programme later suspended its food distribution activities in the Bajaur tribal region, as a security precaution to this suicide attack. This suicide bombing was strongly condemned by U.S. president, Barack Obama. The Pakistani Taliban later claimed responsibility for this suicide attack. This suicide bombing was officially declared the first such suicide attack to involve a female in Pakistan.
