= Oteng Oteng =

Botswana boxer (born 1990)

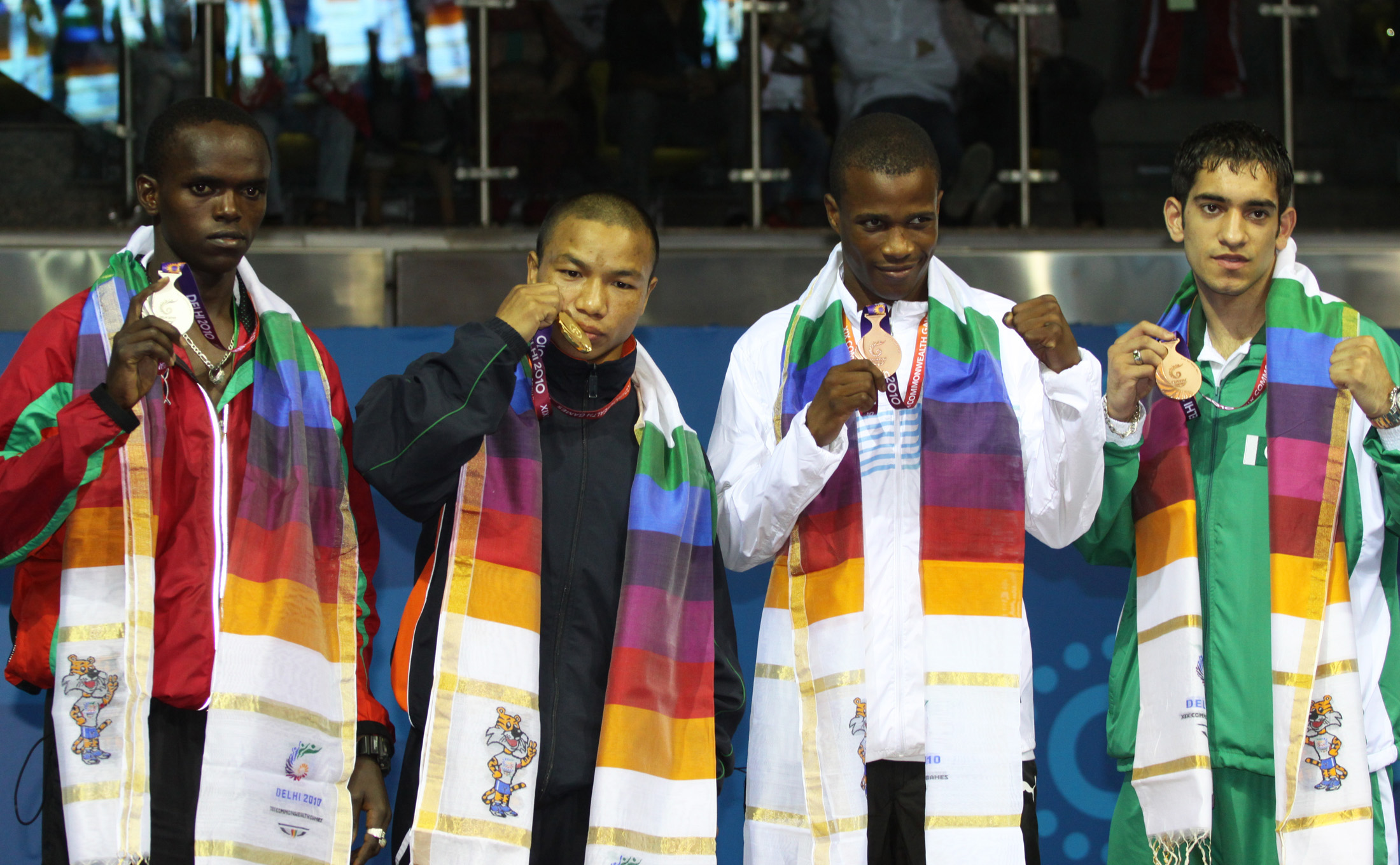
- Oteng Oteng (third from left) at the 2010 Commonwealth Games

Personal information
- Born: 9 January 1990 (age 36)

Sport
- Country: Botswana
- Sport: Boxing
- Event: Flyweight
Medal record
Representing Botswana
Men's Boxing
Commonwealth Games
| Bronze medal – third place | 2010 Delhi | Flyweight |
All-Africa Games
| Gold medal – first place | 2011 Maputo | Flyweight |
- Updated on 22 July 2012

Oteng Oteng (born 9 January 1990) is an amateur boxer from Botswana who qualified for the 2012 Olympics. He was born in Mookane.

At the 2010 Commonwealth Games in Delhi he lost to Benson Gicharu Njangiru in the semifinal and won bronze.

At the 2011 All-Africa Games he won the rematch and the Flyweight title but at the 2011 World Amateur Boxing Championships he lost his second bout to eventual winner Misha Aloyan.

He also won the 2012 African Boxing Olympic Qualification Tournament.

At the 2012 Summer Olympics, Oteng was defeated by Puerto Rican Jeyvier Cintrón in the first round with a score of 14–12.

At the 2014 Commonwealth Games, he lost 0–3 to Reece McFadden in the quarterfinal of the men's flyweight.
