= February 2010 Lower Dir bombing =

Suicide bombing in Dir, Pakistan

- Part of War in North-West Pakistan
- Location of Khyber Pakhtunkhwa in Pakistan
- Location: Khyber Pakhtunkhwa, Pakistan
- Date: 3 February 2010
- Target: Girls' school
- Attack type: Suicide school bombing, Mass murder, terrorism
- Deaths: 8
- Injuries: at least 70
- Perpetrator: Tehrik-i-Taliban Pakistan

The February 2010 Lower Dir bombing was a suicide bombing in the Lower Dir District area of Pakistan on 3 February 2010. At least 8 people, including three American soldiers, died. Three schoolgirls were among the dead. Another 70 people, including 63 schoolgirls, were among the injured.

== Attack ==
The soldiers were travelling in a convoy and headed for the inauguration of a girls' school. They were part of a contingent of approximately 70 soldiers training Pakistani soldiers in counter-insurgency. The bomb went off near another girls' school in the village of Koto along the way. The Koto Girls High School was flattened, leaving the girls crying under the rubble. The American soldiers were helping train the Pakistan Frontier Corps.

== Aftermath ==
Tehrik-i-Taliban Pakistan claimed responsibility for the bombing. They claimed that the attack was in retaliation for the October 2008 attack by Blackwater Worldwide in Peshawar. Pakistan arrested 35 people in connection with this bombing. However, a backlash against U.S. troop presence in Pakistan did not happen against some analysts' predictions.

== See also ==
- List of terrorist incidents, 2010
- Terrorist incidents in Pakistan in 2010
