= List of Palestinian rocket attacks on Israel in 2010 =

The following is a detailed list of Palestinian rocket and mortar attacks on Israel in 2010 from the Gaza Strip.

According to the Israel Security Agency's annual report, Palestinians carried out 150 rocket launches and 215 mortar launches at Israel during the year. This represented a decrease in both types of attacks compared to 2009, in which there were 569 rocket launches and 289 mortar launches.

The report stated that Iran succeeded in smuggling 1,000 mortar shells and hundreds of short-range rockets into the Gaza Strip over the course of the year. The security agency also warned that the Sinai Desert was turning into Hamas's "backyard" for operations and storage of arms. 2010 saw two unique instances of Hamas firing rockets from the Sinai at the southern Israeli port city of Eilat.

== Notable incidents ==
On 18 March, Thai national Manee Singmueangphon was killed by a Palestinian Qassam rocket launched at a greenhouse in Netiv Haasara. Both Ansar al Sunna, an Islamist group affiliated with al-Qaeda, and al Aqsa Martyrs' Brigades, the military wing of Palestinian President Mahmoud Abbas's Fatah party, claimed responsibility for the attack.

On 30 July, a Hamas Grad missile hit a residential neighborhood in the heart of the Israeli coastal city of Ashkelon. No one was physically injured, but eight people suffered from shock and surrounding apartment buildings sustained damage.

On 2 August, Hamas militants in Egypt fired seven Iranian-made Grad missiles at the resort city of Eilat in the extreme south of Israel. Overshot missiles hit the Jordanian city of Aqaba, killing one person and wounding several.

On 20 October, an accidental explosion occurred at a Hamas Qassam rocket training site in the densely crowded Tel As-Sultan neighborhood of Rafah in the southern Gaza Strip. Thirteen people were injured by flying shrapnel, including five children and three women.

== Summary ==
This strictly summarises the content of the article below.

Month	Missiles launched		Effect of missiles		Retaliation by Israel	
	Rockets	Mortars	Killed	Injured	Killed	Injured
January	13	28			4	8
February	5	5				
March	35	6	1			
April	5	18				5
May	14	7				
June	14	17			3	
July	13	10			1	9
August	14	17	1	3		
September	16	23			7	2
October	3	20			2	4
November	5	28				1
December	15	38		2		2
Total	152	217	2	5	17	31

== January ==
According to the Israel Security Agency's monthly summary, Palestinians in the Gaza Strip launched 13 rockets and 28 mortar shells towards Israel in 26 separate attacks. This represented an increase from December 2009, which saw 9 rockets and 3 mortar shell launchings in 11 separate attacks.

January 1
Two mortar shells were fired at Israel from the northern Gaza Strip. One of the shells landed in an open area within Sdot Negev Regional Council limits, while the other landed within the Gaza Strip, near the Kerem Shalom border crossing. The Popular Resistance Committees claimed responsibility for the attacks, claiming it had fired a total of five mortars. No casualties or damage were reported. The Color Red alert system did not sound.

January 5
At about noon, a Qassam rocket fired from the Gaza Strip landed in the Eshkol Regional Council. No casualties or damage were reported. In response, within an hour Israel carried out an airstrike on two tunnels in the Gaza Strip.

January 6
Militants in the southern Gaza Strip were allegedly preparing to launch a rocket attack against Israel when they were hit in an Israeli airstrike. One militant was killed and three were wounded. They were said to belong to the Popular Resistance Committees.

January 7
At least ten mortar shells were launched from the Gaza Strip, in separate incidents beginning around 7:45 am. Seven shells hit open areas in southern Israel, most of them landing between the Kerem Shalom border crossing and a community in the Eshkol Regional Council. Three shells landed within the Gaza Strip. No one was wounded and no damage was reported. Immediately after the firing, the residents of Kibbutz Kerem Shalom were asked to enter a fortified area, where they stayed for about half an hour. The Popular Resistance Committees claimed responsibility for the attack, saying it was in revenge for an Israeli air strike several days earlier that killed two of the group's fighters. The Israeli Defense Ministry responded by closing the Kerem Shalom border crossing until further notice, delaying trucks headed from Israeli into the Gaza Strip.

Militants in the Gaza Strip fired an anti-tank missile at Israeli soldiers near the border. The soldiers returned fire toward the source of the attack. No casualties were reported.

A Katyusha rocket launched from the Gaza Strip landed in an open field south of Ashkelon. No casualties or damage were reported. However, the projectile triggered air sirens throughout the area, causing panic among the residents. The Israeli Air Force responded by striking four targets in the Gaza Strip later that night, including several smuggling tunnels in the southern part of the territory, a tunnel which the army said was intended for infiltration of terrorists into Israel, and a weapons manufacturing facility. Palestinians said three men were killed and two were wounded in the strikes.

January 8
In the evening, two Qassam rockets were fired from the Gaza Strip and landed in open areas within the Shaar Hanegev Regional Council. The Color Red alert system was sounded in nearby Sderot and in other communities. No injuries or damage were reported.

January 9
Early in the morning, a mortar shell was fired from the Gaza Strip and landed in an open area within the Eshkol Regional Council. No injuries or damage were reported.

January 10
At around 4:20 pm, Palestinians fired four mortar shells at a community south of Ashkelon. All the shells landed within the Gaza Strip. No injuries or damage were reported.

In the evening, militants in the Gaza Strip were preparing to fire rockets into Israel when they were struck by an Israeli Air Force air-to-ground missile. Three senior Palestinian Islamic Jihad operatives were killed and five militants were wounded. The three killed were senior Islamic Jihad field commander Awad Nuseir, Hassan al-Qatrawi and Huzaeifa el-Hams.

January 20
According to a morning update on the IDF Hebrew language website, a Qassam rocket was fired at Israel overnight and exploded in the Eshkol Regional Council. No injuries or damage were reported.

== February ==
According to the Israel Security Agency's monthly summary, Palestinians in the Gaza Strip launched 5 rockets and 5 mortar shells towards Israel in 9 separate attacks.

February 2
A Qassam rocket launched from the Gaza Strip detonated in an open area in the Eshkol Regional Council. The Color Red warning system sounded in a number of towns in the vicinity. No injuries or damage were reported. Israel responded to the attack and to a separate explosive-barrel incident with air strikes on a weapons smuggling tunnel under the Gaza Strip's Philadelphi Corridor.

February 3
A Qassam rocket launched from the Gaza Strip detonated near the border fence on farmland in the Shaar Hanegev Regional Council, near Sderot. No injuries or damage were reported.

February 7
A Qassam rocket launched from the Gaza Strip exploded in an open area near Sderot. The Color Red warning system sounded in the surrounding areas. No injuries or damage were reported.

February 12
A Qassam rocket fired from the Gaza Strip landed in an open area between Shaar Hanegev Regional Council and Ashkelon Coast Regional Council. No injuries or damage were reported.

== March ==
According to the Israel Security Agency's monthly summary, Palestinians in the Gaza Strip launched 35 rockets and 6 mortar shells towards Israel in 30 separate attacks.

March 11
A rocket launched from the northern Gaza Strip hit an abandoned workshop in Kibbutz Nirim in the Eshkol Regional Council, located several meters from residents' homes. The rocket damaged the building but caused no casualties. Ansar al-Sunna, a Palestinian Salafist organization affiliated with al-Qaida, claimed responsibility for the attack. In response, the following day Israel carried out an airstrike on a weapons laboratory and a weapons-smuggling tunnel in the Gaza Strip, wounding several people.

Later the same day, two more rockets were launched from the Gaza Strip at Israel, but landed within the Gaza Strip near the border fence.

March 13
In the evening, a rocket fired from the Gaza Strip landed in an open area in the Eshkol Regional Council.

March 16
Two mortar shells were fired from the Gaza Strip into Israel, but missed their intended target and fell within the Gaza Strip. No injuries or damage were reported. The explosions were heard in the Sha'ar Hanegev area.

March 17
In the evening, a Qassam rocket launched from the Gaza Strip exploded in an open area between Sderot and a kibbutz belonging to the Shaar Hanegev Regional Council. Two people, including a young girl, suffered from shock and were treated by a Magen David Adom emergency crew. The Color Red alert system was activated in Sderot before the explosion.

March 18
A Qassam rocket fired at around 1 am hit an open area north of Sderot. No injuries or damage were reported. The Color Red alarm system sounded in Sderot.

A Qassam rocket fired from the Gaza Strip slammed into a greenhouse in Netiv Haasara, a cooperative agricultural community in the Hof Ashkelon Regional Council. Manee Singmueangphon, a 33-year-old Thai agricultural guest worker, was killed in the explosion, and 50 additional Thai workers suffered from shock. Ansar al-Sunna, a small, al-Qaida-inspired Salafist militant group, claimed responsibility for the attack, calling it a response to Israel's "Judaization" of Islamic holy places, without clarifying what acts it was referring to. The Aksa Martyrs Brigades, the military wing of Palestinian President Mahmoud Abbas' Fatah party, independently claimed responsibility later. Islamist militant group Hamas, the de facto ruling authority in Gaza, said that "the government of the Zionist enemy" (Israel) bore responsibility for the attack. (See Associated Press video of the attack)

The rocket was fired half an hour after European Union High Representative for Foreign Affairs Lady Catherine Ashton entered the Gaza Strip on a visit. The attack was condemned by Ashton, by the United Kingdom and by United Nations Secretary-General Ban Ki-moon, the latter calling it an "act of terror" and "violence against civilians". The United States and Russia condemned the attack as well, in a statement by the Middle East Quartet. Human Rights Watch said that Hamas has the responsibility to stop indiscriminate rocket fire into Israel.

Ashkelon Coast Regional Council Chairman Yair Farjun said, "The international community must wake up. We have left Gaza, so what do the Palestinians want now? All of these incidents are happening... because the Palestinians want all Jews out of this land and seek the destruction of Israel". Israeli Deputy Foreign Minister Danny Ayalon said that the attacks were the result of Hamas incitement to violence and a natural consequence of the Goldstone report, adding that Israel still seeks peace but would continue to defend its citizens.

Israel responded to the attack by carrying out airstrikes on six targets in the Gaza Strip: three weapons-smuggling tunnels on the Egyptian border, a weapons production facility and two tunnels intended for infiltration into Israel to carry out attacks. Two Palestinians were reportedly wounded in the strikes. Israel also sent a letter of complaint to United Nations Secretary-General Ban Ki-moon and the UN Security Council. There was no report of a response.

March 19
A Qassam rocket launched from the Gaza Strip landed in the Sha'ar Hanegev area. No injuries or damage were reported. Israel responded to the attack by carrying out airstrikes on a Hamas facility near Dahiniyeh in the southern Gaza Strip and on two weapons-smuggling tunnels under the Gaza-Egypt border. Palestinians said that fourteen people were injured in the second strike.

March 20
Four Qassam rockets were fired from the Gaza Strip, causing the Color Red alarm to sound several times and forcing residents in southern Israel to take cover in secure rooms. The first rocket landed in an open area in the Hof Ashkelon Regional Council. Shortly after the strike, a second rocket landed in an open area near Sderot, activating the Color Red alarm in the Sderot region and in the Ashkelon area. A third rocket landed within the Gaza Strip near Kissufim. In the evening, a fourth rocket landed in an open area in the Shaar Hanegev Regional Council. No injuries or damage were reported in any of the attacks.

March 21
In the evening, a Qassam rocket fired from the northern Gaza Strip struck an open field in a kibbutz south of Ashkelon, in the Hof Ashkelon Regional Council. No injuries or damage were reported. Ashkelon's Deputy Mayor Shlomo Cohen said, "We are witnessing a deterioration whereby the rockets are getting closer and closer to Ashkelon. This merely validates our fears and demands for the fortification of educational institutions."

A second rocket fired in the evening fell within the Gaza Strip.

Israel responded to the attacks by carrying out an airstrike on a smuggling tunnel in the southern Gaza Strip. No injuries were reported.

March 22
Two Qassam rockets were fired at Israel. One rocket exploded in an open area around noon, and several hours later another rocket landed within the Gaza Strip, near the Erez crossing. Israel responded to the attack and to attacks in previous days by carrying out an airstrike on a weapons storage facility in Gaza City that night. Palestinians said four civilians were lightly injured from shrapnel, though the facility was empty at the time.

March 23
A Qassam rocket fired from the northern Gaza Strip exploded near a parking lot in the heart of a populated zone in the Hof Ashkelon Regional Council. No injuries or damage were reported. Israel responded to the attack and to other attacks in recent days by carrying out an airstrike on a weapons warehouse in the northern Gaza Strip that night. No injuries were reported.

March 26
A rocket was fired from the Gaza Strip into Israel, according to the IDF. No injuries or damage were reported.

March 27
In the morning, two Qassam rockets were fired at Israel. The first landed within the Gaza Strip. The second, fired from the northern Gaza Strip, landed near a kibbutz in the Sha'ar Hanegev Regional Council. The Color Red alarm was activated in the area shortly before the rocket exploded. No injuries or damage were reported.

March 29
A Qassam rocket launched from the Gaza Strip landed in an open area within the Eshkol Regional Council during the eve of Passover. No injuries or damage were reported, and the Color Red alarm did not sound. Israel did not immediately respond to the attack.

== April ==
According to the Israel Security Agency, Palestinians in the Gaza Strip launched 18 mortar shells and 5 rockets at Israel in 15 separate attacks.

April 1
At night, a Qassam rocket fired from the Gaza Strip landed in an open area in the Hof Ashkelon Regional Council, near Ashkelon, causing damage but no injuries. Israel responded by carrying out airstrikes on four targets in the Gaza Strip used as arms storage and weapons manufacturing sites. These included a guard post of Hamas's armed wing in an open area near Khan Younis, a metal foundry in Nusseirat, a facility in Gaza City's Sabra neighborhood identified by Palestinians as the Daloul cheese factory, and a nearby warehouse. According to a Palestinian official, five people including three children were lightly injured.

April 3
In the afternoon, a mortar shell fired from the northern Gaza Strip landed in an open area near an Israeli community in the Sha'ar Hanegev Regional Council. No injuries or damage were reported. The Popular Front for the Liberation of Palestine claimed responsibility for the attack, stating that it was carried out "in response to Zionist crimes".

April 4
In the late evening, a Qassam rocket fired from the Gaza Strip hit an open space in the Shaar Hanegev Regional Council. No injuries or damage were reported. The fire came several hours after Israel allowed trucks stocked with goods into the strip.

April 7
Six mortars were fired from the northern Gaza Strip toward the Eshkol region of Israel, but all fell within the Gaza Strip. One of the mortars hit a house in Beit Hanoun, sending shrapnel flying and lighting a small fire inside. Six Palestinians were injured, one of them seriously. The attack came two days after Islamic Jihad in Gaza announced that it would cease firing rockets into Israel, and several days after Hamas announced it would try to reduce attacks.

April 8
Militants in the Gaza Strip opened fire at Israeli soldiers on the Israeli side of the border fence near Kibbutz Kissufim, shelling them with at least three mortar bombs and two RPG anti-tank projectiles. The soldiers were conducting a routine patrol. No injuries were reported.

April 12
On Holocaust Memorial Day, Palestinian militants fired two rockets at Israel from the Gaza Strip. One fell in the Sha'ar Hanegev region, the other near the Gaza border fence. No injuries or damage were reported. The Color Red alarm did not sound.

April 15
At night, a Qassam rocket fired by militants in the Gaza Strip hit an open area in the Eshkol Regional Council. No injuries or damage were reported.

April 22
Before dawn, three 122mm Grad rockets were fired from the Sinai Peninsula in Egypt at the resort town of Eilat at the extreme south of Israel. One rocket exploded in the neighboring town of Aqaba in Jordan, destroying an empty refrigerator warehouse. The other two rockets fell into the Red Sea. No injuries were reported. No group claimed responsibility, but it was later determined that Hamas was behind the attack.

== May ==
According to the Israel Security Agency's monthly summary, Palestinians in the Gaza Strip launched 14 rockets and 7 mortar shells at Israel in 17 separate attacks.

May 8
A Qassam rocket fired from the northern Gaza Strip exploded south of Ashkelon, in an open area in the Ashkelon Coast Regional Council. The Color Red alarm sounded in several nearby communities. No injuries or damage were reported. Israel responded the following day by carrying out airstrikes on two targets in the Gaza Strip. No injuries were reported.

May 19
In the evening, at the end of the Shavuot holiday, a Qassam rocket fired from the Gaza Strip landed near Ashkelon, hitting an open area in the Eshkol Regional Council. No injuries or damage were reported. Ansar al-Sunnah, a Salafist militant group, claimed responsibility for the attack. Israel responded by carrying out airstrikes on three Gaza Strip border tunnels, one in the north and two in the south, which the IDF said were intended for transporting terrorists into Israel. No injuries were reported.

May 25
Two mortar shells were fired from the Gaza Strip at the Netiv Ha'asara area, near Ashkelon. At night, two additional mortar shells were fired at Israel, with one exploding in the Sha'ar Hanegev area and the other exploding within the Gaza Strip. No injuries or damage were reported in either of the attacks, and the Color Red alarm did not sound. Israel responded later that night by carrying out airstrikes on two Gaza Strip border tunnels, one in the north and one in the south. The IDF said the tunnels were intended for carrying out terrorist attacks within Israel.

May 26
In the late evening, a Qassam rocket fired at Israel exploded in an open area in the Ashkelon Coast Regional Council. The Color Red alarm sounded in an adjacent community. Later in the evening, two mortar shells were fired at Israel but landed within Gaza strip, adjacent to the Eshkol Regional Council. No injuries or damage were reported in either of the incidents.

May 28
Shortly after 12 am, two Qassam rockets launched from the northern Gaza Strip exploded on a road in the Shaar Hanegev industrial zone, near the city of Sderot. The blast shattered the windows of a nearby building, and shrapnel from the explosion damaged a nearby truck. No injuries were reported. The Color Red alarm sounded throughout the city of Sderot. Israel responded to the attack, and to a separate attempt by Gaza gunmen to infiltrate Israel, with two airstrikes, one on a weapons production facility in the north and one on a border tunnel in the south. The IDF said the tunnel was intended for carrying out terrorist attacks within Israel. No injuries were reported.

== June ==
According to the Israel Security Agency's monthly summary, Palestinians in the Gaza Strip launched 14 rockets and 17 mortar shells towards Israel in 22 separate attacks.

June 1
Overnight, a Qassam rocket exploded among greenhouses in the Ashkelon Coast Regional Council, damaging a greenhouse. No injuries were reported. The Color Red alarm did not sound, but the explosion was heard in the area.

Later that day, three militants from Palestinian Islamic Jihad fired two rockets into southern Israel, which landed in open areas and caused no injuries. According to the group, its militants were killed shortly after the attack by an Israeli airstrike.

June 3
Around 9 pm, two Qassam rockets exploded in an open area south of Ashkelon. Another rocket landed in the Ashkelon Coast Regional Council, near a kibbutz. A fourth rocket caused the Color Red alarm to sound in Sderot, and apparently landed in an open area near the city.

June 14
Around 11:30 pm, a Qassam rocket exploded in an open area in Eshkol Regional Council. No injuries or damage were reported.

June 24
Eight mortars and one rocket were fired at Israeli communities. Around 1:30 pm, three mortar shells exploded in open areas in the Hof Ashkelon Regional Council. Around 5:30 pm, three additional mortar shells were fired from the Gaza Strip but fell on the Palestinian side of the border fence, in the vicinity of the Erez crossing. Later, two more mortar shells exploded south of a kibbutz in the Shaar Hanegev Regional Council. Shortly after that, a Qassam rocket exploded near a kibbutz north of the Gaza Strip. No injuries or damage were reported in any of the attacks. Israel responded by carrying out three airstrikes in the Gaza Strip, targeting a weapons cache in the north and two smuggling tunnels in the south.

June 28
A mortar shell fired from the northern Gaza Strip landed between two kibbutzim in the Shaar Hanegev Regional Council, causing no injuries or damage. Later in the day, a militant from the Popular Front for the Liberation of Palestine fired mortar shells from eastern Gaza City at Israeli soldiers operating on the Israeli side of the nearby border fence, damaging a military vehicle but causing no injuries. The man was killed on the scene by Israeli aircraft fire.

June 30
At about 4 am, a Qassam rocket fired from the Gaza Strip hit a packaging factory inside a community in the Sdot Negev Regional Council, badly damaging it. Israel responded with airstrikes on several targets in the Gaza Strip, including a weapons manufacturing facility in the north and a terrorist infiltration tunnel in the south. No injuries were reported.

== July ==
According to the Israel Security Agency, Palestinians in the Gaza Strip launched 13 rockets and 10 mortar shells at Israel in 17 separate attacks.

July 24
Four rockets and two mortar shells were fired on Israel. No injuries were reported. One of the rockets, which landed near Kibbutz Nahal Oz in the evening, was of an unknown type and appeared to have been made outside the Gaza Strip. On the same day a fifth rocket was found unexploded in a kibbutz in the Shaar HaNegev Regional Council area; this rocket was thought to have been launched the previous night and to have reached Israel without setting off the Color Red alarm system. Israel responded two days later by carrying out airstrikes on a weapons manufacturing site in the northern Gaza Strip and two weapons smuggling tunnels in the South.

July 30
Just after 8:30 am, a Grad missile fired from Beit Hanoun exploded in a residential neighborhood in the heart of the Israeli resort city of Ashkelon. Eight people suffered shock. Two empty floors of an apartment building, several cars and a nearby pavement sustained damage, while many windows were shattered. The Color Red alert system was heard across the city prior to the rocket landing allowing residents to enter protected areas. Police urged residents to remain indoors for fear of additional attacks. Ashkelon Mayor Benny Vaknin and the local parents' committee expressed unwillingness to begin the school year until children were protected from rockets with fortifications. Hamas claimed responsibility for the attack. United Nations Middle East envoy Robert Serry said indiscriminate rocket fire against civilians was completely unacceptable, and constituted a terrorist attack.

Around 12:30 pm, two additional mortar shells struck a location variously reported as in the Sha'ar Hanegev Regional Council or the Eshkol Regional Council.

Israel responded that night with airstrikes on a Hamas site in the northern Gaza Strip, a weapons manufacturing warehouse in the center of the territory, and a weapons smuggling tunnel in the South. The second strike, near Nuseirat, killed senior Hamas military commander and rocket maker Issa al-Batran, and wounded nine. Hamas vowed revenge for al-Batran's death.

July 31
A Qassam rocket fired from the northern Gaza Strip directly hit the roof of a daycare center for disabled people outside of Sderot, in the Sha'ar Hanegev Regional Council. The building was empty at the time and no injuries were reported, but most of its second story was destroyed. The Color Red siren sounded prior to the explosion. Israel responded that night with airstrikes on two Gazan tunnels, a weapons smuggling tunnel under the Gaza-Egypt border and a tunnel under the Gaza-Israel border used to assault Israeli territory. Israel also filled a complaint to the United Nations, stating that rocket attacks against civilians and civilian property constitute a war crime and a crime against humanity. As of early August, no response from the United Nations was reported.

== August ==
According to the Israel Security Agency's monthly summary, Palestinians in the Gaza Strip launched 14 rockets and 17 mortar shells towards Israel in 19 separate attacks.

August 2
Seven Grad missiles of Iranian manufacture hit the resort city of Eilat at the extreme South of Israel, as well as the neighboring city of Aqaba in Jordan and surrounding areas. The missiles were determined to have been launched by Hamas militants operating in the nearby Sinai Peninsula in Egypt. In Aqaba, one Jordanian citizen was killed and three more were wounded. No injuries or damage were reported in Eilat.

August 16
Two Qassam rockets fired from the northern Gaza Strip landed in an open area in the Eshkol Regional Council. No injuries or damage were reported. The attack occurred two hours after a border incident in which two Palestinian militants attempted to place a bomb along the Israel-Gaza fence, leading to a clash in which one of the militants, senior Islamic Jihad operative Basem Da'ma, was killed and an Israeli soldier was injured.

August 17
In the morning, militants from the Popular Resistance Committees fired two mortar shells at IDF soldiers carrying out engineering work in the Eshkol Regional Council, near the area where the previous day's border incident took place. Two IDF soldiers were lightly injured. The soldiers returned fire at the source of the launches, causing no reported injuries or damage. Israel responded with airstrikes on a weapons workshop and three smuggling tunnels in the Gaza Strip. No injuries were reported.

August 25
A 60-millimeter mortar shell fired from the northern Gaza Strip exploded in an open area near a border kibbutz in the Shaar Hanegev Regional Council. No injuries or damage were reported. The Color Red alarm did not sound.

== September ==
According to the Israel Security Agency's monthly summary, Palestinians in the Gaza Strip launched 16 rockets and 23 mortar shells towards Israel in 30 separate attacks.

September 4
A Qassam rocket fired from the Gaza Strip landed in Sderot. No injuries or damage were reported. Israel responded to the attack and to separate Hamas shooting attacks in the West Bank with airstrikes on three tunnels in the Gaza Strip: two smuggling tunnels under the border with Egypt and a kidnapping tunnel under the border with Israel. According to Hamas, two people were killed in the collapse of one of the smuggling tunnels.

September 6
In the morning, a mortar shell fired from the Gaza Strip landed in the Eshkol Regional Council. No injuries or damage were reported.

September 7
Around 2 am, a Qassam rocket fired from the Gaza Strip struck Sderot. No injuries or damage were reported. The Color Red alarm sounded in Sderot and the Shaar Hanegev Regional Council.

September 8
In the morning, on the eve of the Jewish New Year, a mortar shell fired from the Gaza Strip fell in a kibbutz in the southern part of the Shaar Hanegev Regional Council, exploding near several children's school buildings. One of the buildings, a kindergarten with a fortified roof but without fortified walls, was lightly damaged. The strike occurred 30 minutes before the children were due to arrive, and there were no injuries. Studies resumed normally.

September 9
On the first day of the Jewish New Year, a Qassam rocket fired from the Gaza Strip landed in an open area in the Sdot Negev Regional Council. In the evening, a Qassam rocket landed in an open area in the Shaar Hanegev Regional Council. The Color Red alarm sounded and the explosion was heard in the area. No injuries or damage were reported in either of the attacks. That night, Israel responded to the attacks of the day and of the previous day with airstrikes on at least four terror-related targets in the Gaza Strip, including a Hamas headquarters in Gaza City and a smuggling tunnel in the southern part of the territory. Two members of the Hamas security forces were wounded.

September 10
In the morning, on the second day of the Jewish New Year, a Qassam rocket fired from the Gaza Strip exploded in the Shaar Hanegev Regional Council. No injuries or damage were reported.

September 12
In the morning, two rockets fired from the Gaza Strip fell in the Shaar Hanegev Regional Council, one in a kibbutz orchard and the other in an open area. No injuries or damage were reported. The Color Red alarm failed to sound. The Popular Resistance Committees claimed responsibility, saying the action was in retaliation for Israeli attacks against Gaza civilians, without specifying what they were referring to.

September 13
In the early morning, two Qassam rockets fired from the Gaza Strip exploded in an open area in the Shaar Hanegev Regional Council. No injuries or damage were reported. The Color Red alarm sounded in the area. The attack followed a border incident that took place in the northern Gaza Strip the previous evening, in which one Palestinian who had raised a rocket launcher was killed by IDF soldiers along with two civilians standing by at close distance.

September 15
Around 1 am, two Qassam rockets were fired from the Gaza Strip. One rocket exploded in an open area within Ashkelon's southern industrial zone. The second rocket was not located. The Color Red alarm did not sound, but the explosion was heard by Ashkelon residents. This was the first time in over a month that Gazan terrorists had fired towards the coastal city.

Throughout the day, nine mortar bombs fired from the Gaza Strip hit open areas in the Eshkol Regional Council: two fell in the early morning, four at midday and three in the afternoon. Two of the mortars were phosphorus bombs, but police said that they posed no greater danger than regular mortars. No injuries or damage were reported in any of the attacks, which came a day after Ahmed Jaabari, leader of Hamas’ military wing, issued a statement threatening a wave of violence intended to derail the recently renewed Israeli-Palestinian peace talks.

Israel responded at midday with an airstrike on a smuggling tunnel in the southern Gaza Strip, near Rafah. According to Palestinian sources, one 21-year-old man who was in the tunnel was killed and two others were wounded. Israel responded again that night with airstrikes on two Gaza Strip weapons storage sites, one in the north and one in the south. No injuries were reported. The Israeli government also filed a complaint to the United Nations over the phosphorus shells, as did Haim Yalin, head of the Eshkol Regional Council.

September 20
At night, a Qassam rocket fired from the Gaza Strip landed in an open area in the Eshkol Regional Council. No injuries or damage were reported.

September 21
A few hours after Israeli Prime Minister Benjamin Netanyahu toured the rocket-stricken cities of Ashkelon and Sderot, a Qassam rocket was fired from the gaza Strip at Israel. The rocket landed within the Gaza Strip, causing no injuries or damage. The Color Red alarm did not sound, but the explosion was heard by residents of a nearby Israeli kibbutz in the Sha'ar Hanegev Regional Council.

September 24
At about 6 am on the second day of the Jewish Sukkot holiday, a Qassam rocket was shot from the northern Gaza Strip towards Israel. The rocket exploded within the Gaza Strip, causing no reported injuries or damage. The Color Red alarm sounded in one of the communities in the Ashkelon Coast Regional Council.

September 27
At about 11:45 pm, three Palestinian Islamic Jihad militants were killed by an Israeli drone strike as they were preparing to fire rockets into Israel. The incident took place at a militant observation outpost in Bureij in the central Gaza Strip.

== October ==
According to the Israel Security Agency's monthly summary, Palestinians in the Gaza Strip launched 3 rockets and 20 mortar shells towards Israel in 13 separate attacks.

October 2
A mortar shell fired from the Gaza Strip exploded in the Eshkol Regional Council. No injuries or damage were reported.

October 6
Two Qassam rockets were fired at Israel from the Gaza Strip. One exploded in an open field near a kibbutz in the Eshkol Regional Council. The other landed within the Gaza Strip, near the border fence. No injuries or damage were reported. Israel responded shortly after midnight with airstrikes on a Hamas training camp in Gaza City and a second, unspecified location. Palestinian sources said four people were injured.

October 9
A mortar shell fired from the Gaza Strip landed in the Ashkelon Coast Regional Council. No injuries or damage were reported. The Popular Resistance Committees claimed responsibility for the attack, saying that it fired on Israeli soldiers who had entered Beit Lahiya in the Gaza Strip. The statement did not explain why the mortar landed in Israel.

October 14
A Qassam rocket fired from the Gaza Strip landed in an open area south of Ashkelon, causing no injuries or damage, according to The Jerusalem Post and Nana 10. At the same time, Ynet reported a false alarm sounding in Ashkelon, though it was not clear whether this indicated that no rocket attack occurred or merely that the attack did not threaten Ashkelon. Other media and the IDF did not report a rocket attack.

October 17
A Hamas squad in the northern Gaza Strip was preparing to launch rockets into Israel when it was targeted in an Israeli airstrike. Two militants were killed.

October 21
In the afternoon, a mortar shell fired from the Gaza Strip exploded in an open area in the Eshkol Regional Council. No injuries or damage were reported.

October 24
In the evening, three mortar shells were fired at Israel from the Gaza Strip. One landed in an open area in the Eshkol Regional Council, and the other two exploded within the Gaza Strip. No injuries or damage were reported. Islamic Jihad claimed responsibility, saying it had fired four mortar shells toward an Israeli force operating in Al-Qarara in the Gaza Strip. No actual Israeli activity in the area was reported in the media or by the IDF.

October 25
In the late morning, five mortar shells were fired at Israel from the Gaza Strip. Two shells landed in open areas in the Eshkol Regional Council, and the other three landed in open areas within the Gaza Strip. No injuries or damage were reported.

October 27
A mortar shell fired from the Gaza Strip exploded in an open area near a kibbutz in the Shaar Hanegev Regional Council. No injuries or damage were reported.

October 28
In the afternoon, a mortar shell fired from the Gaza Strip landed in an open area in the Eshkol Regional Council. No injuries or damage were reported.

October 30
Two mortar shells fired from the Gaza Strip landed in the Eshkol Regional Council. No injuries or damage were reported.

== November ==
According to the Israel Security Agency's monthly summary, Palestinians in the Gaza Strip launched 5 rockets and 28 mortar shells at Israel in 16 separate attacks.

November 6
In the morning, a Qassam rocket fired from the Gaza Strip hit an open area in the Sdot Negev Regional Council. No injuries or damage were reported. The Popular Resistance Committees claimed responsibility. Israel responded with two airstrikes, one targeting smuggling tunnels under the Gaza-Egypt border and another on a site in Khan Yunis. Palestinians said one person was hurt by broken glass in the first strike.

November 9
In the late morning, two mortar shells were fired at Israel from the Gaza Strip. One landed in an open area in the Eshkol Regional Council, and the other landed within the Strip. No injuries or damage were reported.

November 16
In the early afternoon, a Qassam rocket was found in a field of kibbutz in the Sdot Negev Regional Council. The rocket was thought to have been fired during the night. No injuries were reported, but significant damage was caused.

November 18
In the afternoon, three mortar shells fired from the Gaza Strip hit open areas in the Eshkol Regional Council. No injuries or damage were reported.

In the evening, a Qassam rocket fired from the central Gaza Strip hit an open area, also in the Eshkol Regional Council. No injuries or damage were reported. Both attacks occurred the same day that the Army of Islam, a Gazan group linked to al-Qaeda, released a statement saying that "aggressor Jews" will not be safe from rockets and other attacks until they "leave the land of Palestine".

November 19
During the night, two Palestinian Qassam rockets landed in the Merhavim Regional Council. No injuries or damage were reported.

The escalation in rocket attacks continued when at around 3:15 am, a Grad rocket fired from the Gaza Strip exploded next to a cattle shed in the Merhavim Regional Council, slightly north of Ofakim. Three cows were injured and the cattle shed sustained damage. No human injuries were reported.

At around 4:30 am, a Palestinian Qassam rocket fired in the direction of the Shaar Hanegev Regional Council fell within the Gaza Strip. No injuries or damage were reported.

In the afternoon, three Palestinian mortar shells hit open areas in the Eshkol Regional Council. No injuries or damage were reported.

An hour later, four Palestinian white phosphorus mortar shells hit open areas in the Ashkelon Coast Regional Council. No injuries or damage were reported. The Popular Resistance Committees claimed responsibility, stating that the attack was in response to the IDF assassination of two militant leaders of the Army of Islam, an al-Qaeda affiliated group, earlier that week.

Israel responded that evening with airstrikes on three terror-related targets in the Gaza Strip: a deserted building in Deir al-Balah and two sites in Khan Yunis, one of which was an Islamic Jihad training base. Palestinians said that six people were injured in the Deir al-Balah strike. Just before midnight, Israel carried out an additional airstrike on a smuggling tunnel in the southern part of the Strip, causing no injuries. Israel also filed an official complaint with the United Nations.

November 28
A Qassam rocket fired from the Gaza Strip exploded in mid-air in the Shaar Hanegev Regional Council. No injuries or damage were reported.

== December ==
According to the Israel Security Agency's monthly summary, Palestinians in the Gaza Strip launched 15 rockets and 38 mortar shells towards Israel in 30 separate attacks.

December 6
After nightfall, a Qassam rocket fired from the Gaza Strip landed in an open area near Ashkelon, in the Ashkelon Coast Regional Council. The Color Red alarm sounded in the city and in surrounding communities, and residents were instructed to enter fortified rooms. No injuries or damage were reported. The Popular Front for the Liberation of Palestine (PFLP) claimed responsibility for the attack, declaring that the projectile marked the anniversary of the PFLP's establishment and that the group would continue to oppose "Israel's occupation".

December 7
Two mortar shells fired from the Gaza Strip exploded in an open area in the Eshkol Regional Council. No injuries or damage were reported. That night, Israel responded to the attack and to the previous day's rocket attack with airstrikes on a weapons warehouse and a smuggling tunnel in the southern Gaza Strip. No injuries were reported.

December 8
In the afternoon, a mortar shell fired from the Gaza Strip landed in the Shaar Hanegev Regional Council, damaging a home in an unidentified kibbutz. No injuries were reported.

Around 11 pm, Palestinians fired five mortar shells from the northern Gaza Strip into the Eshkol Regional Council. Near Kerem Shalom, a man suffered light wounds to his upper body from one of the mortars. After being treated by IDF forces on the scene, he was airlifted to the Soroka Medical Center. Local residents were instructed to enter fortified areas.

Israel responded overnight with airstrikes on a Hamas weapons facility in the central Gaza Strip, a Hamas training site in the East and an empty structure in Al-Mughraqa, south of Gaza City. No injuries were reported.

December 11
Palestinians fired a Qassam rocket from the Gaza Strip into an open field near a kibbutz in the Sha'ar Hanegev Regional Council. The Color Red alarm sounded in the area. No injuries or damage were reported.

December 18
East of Deir al-Balah in the central Gaza Strip, five militants from Islamic Jihad and the Popular Resistance Committees were killed by an Israeli airstrike as they were preparing to fire rockets into Israel.

December 19
Palestinians fired two mortar shells from the Gaza Strip into the Eshkol Regional Council. No injuries or damage were reported.

In the evening, Palestinians fired two additional mortar shells from the Gaza Strip into the Ashkelon Coast Regional Council. No injuries or damage were reported.

The Popular Resistance Committees claimed responsibility for mortars fired into Israel that day, saying it had fired nine shells at a group of tanks near Kerem Shalom and two mortars at an army post. The group said the attack was in response to "Israeli crimes", citing an airstrike against its militants the previous day (see above). However, the Democratic Front for the Liberation of Palestine also said it fired three mortars at an Israeli army base that day in retaliation for the same airstrike.

December 20
In the afternoon, Palestinians in the Gaza Strip fired seven mortar shells into the Eshkol Regional Council.

Several hours later, Palestinians fired two or three additional mortar shells at open areas in unspecified regions in Israel. No injuries or damage were reported in either barrage.

The Popular Resistance Committees claimed responsibility for mortar firing that day, saying it had fired ten shells at a military site in retaliation for the Israeli airstrike of 18 December (see above). Israel responded overnight with airstrikes on seven alleged terror targets in the Gaza Strip, which it detailed as: three Hamas-operated tunnels in the north, and an additional Hamas-operated tunnel, a smuggling tunnel, a weapons manufacturing facility and a terror activity center in the south. According to Palestinians, two Hamas militants were injured, but the accuracy of this report was unclear.

December 21
At about 8 am, Palestinians in the Gaza Strip fired a Qassam rocket at Kibbutz Zikim in the Ashkelon Coast Regional Council. The projectile exploded several yards from a kindergarten as parents were bringing their children to it. No one was hurt at the preschool, but a 14-year-old girl in a nearby building was moderately injured in the leg by flying glass. Several other people suffered from shock. A staff member said the children would not be evacuated because the kindergarten was inside a bomb shelter to begin with. The Army of Islam, a group espousing global jihad and affiliated with al-Qaeda, claimed responsibility for the attack. The group said that it was responding "to the massacres committed by the Zionist enemy", citing an Israeli attack that killed three of the group's militants the previous month. Israel responded that evening with an airstrike on a Hamas training camp in the southern Gaza Strip. The events sparked concerned speculation of an imminent escalation of violence. Jerusalem also submitted a complaint to the United Nations Security Council. UN Middle East envoy Robert Serry condemned the "firing of indiscriminate mortars and rockets by militant groups in Gaza at Israel which has escalated in recent days", adding that "these attacks are in clear violation of international humanitarian law and endanger civilians in Israel". Serry said that Israel has a right to self defense but urged Jerusalem "to exercise maximum restraint and take every precaution to ensure that its forces do not endanger civilians in Gaza".

December 24
In the morning, Palestinians in the Gaza Strip fired a mortar shell which hit an open area in the Eshkol Regional Council. No injuries or damage were reported.

In the early evening, Palestinians fired a Qassam rocket that landed in an open area in the Ashkelon Coast Regional Council, near Ashkelon. No injuries or damage were reported.

Israel responded to the attacks overnight with airstrikes on four sites in the Gaza Strip: three strikes targeting smuggling tunnels under the border with Egypt and one strike targeting a car as it was pulling up near a site used by Hamas' military wing, in which two occupants were injured. Adham Abu Selmiya, a spokesman for the Hamas-run medical services said the two men were civilians. However, witnesses said they appeared to be militants.

December 26
In the late morning, Palestinians in the Gaza Strip fired two rockets at the Eshkol Regional Council. No injuries or damage were reported.

December 30
After nightfall, a Qassam rocket fired by Palestinians in the Gaza Strip hit an open area in the Eshkol Regional Council. No injuries or damage were reported.
