= January 2010 Khar bombing =

Bombing in Pakistan

Coordinates: 34°41′N 71°30′E

January 2010 Bajaur bombing
- Location: Khar, Pakistan
- Date: 30 January 2010; 16.30AM – (UTC+5)
- Target: Multiple
- Attack type: Suicide Bomber
- Deaths: 16
- Injuries: 25

January 2010 Bajaur bombing was a suicide bombing in Khar town in Bajaur in Pakistan on January 30, 2010. At least 16 people were killed when a man dressed in a burqa walked up to a military checkpoint and detonated himself. 2 soldiers were among the dead and at least 25 were injured.

== History ==
It has long been suspected that Osama bin Laden and Ayman al-Zawahiri have been hiding in Bajaur. A curfew was imposed in the district after the blast. The bomber was thought to be between 18 – 23 years of age. The attack drew widespread condemnation in Pakistan. The bombing was condemned by President Asif Ali Zardari, Prime Minister Syed Yousaf Raza Gilani, Speaker National Assembly Fahmida Mirza, Deputy Speaker Faisal Karim Kundi, Chairman Senate Farooq H Naek, Deputy Chairman Jan Muhammad Jamali, Foreign Minister Shah Mehmood Qureshi, Minister for Defence Chaudhry Ahmad Mukhtar, Minister for Religious Affairs Hamid Saeed Kazmi, Minister for Zakat and Ushr Noor-ul-Haq Qadri and Minister of State for Religious Affairs Shagufta Jumani.

== See also ==
- List of terrorist incidents, 2010
- List of terrorist incidents in Pakistan since 2001
