= Mohmand Agency bombing =

2010 suicide-bombing attack in Pakistan

- Location: Mohmand Agency, Federally Administered Tribal Areas, Pakistan
- Date: 9 July 2010
- Attack type: Suicide bomb
- Weapon: T.N.T.
- Deaths: 104
- Injuries: at least 120
- Motive: Terrorism

On 9 July 2010, a suicide bombing occurred in a market in Yakaghund, Mohmand Agency, in the Federally Administered Tribal Areas of Pakistan. At least 104 people were killed while more than 120 people were wounded. This was the last of a streak of attacks that was the record most major terrorist attacks (over 40 deaths) in a row in the Pakistan war on terrorism, with least 7 in a row, much more than the previous record of 2 which happened only 2 times; marking an escalating of the War on Terrorism in Pakistan.

== Background ==
In late 2009 and early 2010, the Pakistani military was engaged in a campaign to clear militants from Mohmand Agency and the surrounding area, with the commander of forces in the area claiming that 80 per cent of militants had been cleared as of September 2009. The area, which borders Kunar Province, Afghanistan, had been the scene of violence prior to the attack as a result of spillover from neighbouring Afghanistan.

== Attack ==
At least 104 people were killed and over 120 injured in the bombing which left a crater in the road 5 feet (1.5 m) deep. The target of the attack was believed to be a meeting (jirga) of tribal elders near the local government headquarters. Internationally designated terrorist group Tehrik-i-Taliban Pakistan claimed responsibility for the attack. According to a local TTP spokesman, the meeting was targeted as it was convened to discuss a plan against the TTP.

The attack was thought to be revenge for an offensive carried out by the Pakistani Army against militants in the tribal area. The blast caused significant damage to the market area, as well as to a local prison, from which several prisoners were able to escape after a wall partially collapsed.

== Aftermath ==
The more seriously injured casualties were taken to hospital in Peshawar, the administrative centre of the tribal areas while the less seriously injured were treated in local hospitals. This was the deadliest attack in 2010 in Pakistan up till that time.

== See also ==
- List of terrorist incidents, 2010
- List of terrorist incidents in Pakistan since 2001
- Islamic terrorism
- Terrorism in Pakistan
