= Khar, Bajaur =

Town in Khyber Pakhtunkhwa, Pakistan

Khar خار ښار
- Location within Khyber Pakhtunkhwa
- Coordinates: 34.74°N 71.53°E
- Country: Pakistan
- Province: Khyber Pakhtunkhwa
- District: Bajaur
- Subdivision: Khar Bajaur
- Elevation: 870 m (2,850 ft)
- Time zone: UTC+5 (PST)

Khar (Pashto: ښار, X̌ār), also spelled Khaar, is the headquarters of Bajaur District in Khyber Pakhtunkhwa, Pakistan. Khar was one of the largest towns in the Federally Administered Tribal Areas (merged into Khyber Pakhtunkhwa in 2018). It lies near the border with Afghanistan. The headquarters of the Bajaur Scouts are located in the town. A civil colony is located in the town and this place is the court of Bajaur.

== History ==
On 30 October 2006, the Chenagai airstrike happened near Khar. Helicopter gunships fired missiles and destroyed an al-Qaeda-linked training facility and killed 80 local students in a northwestern tribal area near the Afghan border, in a madrassa.

On 30 January 2010, a young male suicide bomber wearing a burqa killed 16 people and himself at a security checkpoint at a bazaar.

On 25 December 2010, at least 40 people were killed and at least 50 others were injured in the early morning when an islamic extremist threw two hand grenades and detonated her explosive vest at a World Food Programme (WFP) distribution centre.

On 30 July 2023, an Islamic State – Khorasan Province suicide bomber killed over 60 people during the gathering of Jamiat Ulema-e-Islam-Fazl, an Islamist political party.

== Population ==
The population of Khar was 130,267 in 2017.
