= Suranjoy Singh =

Indian boxer

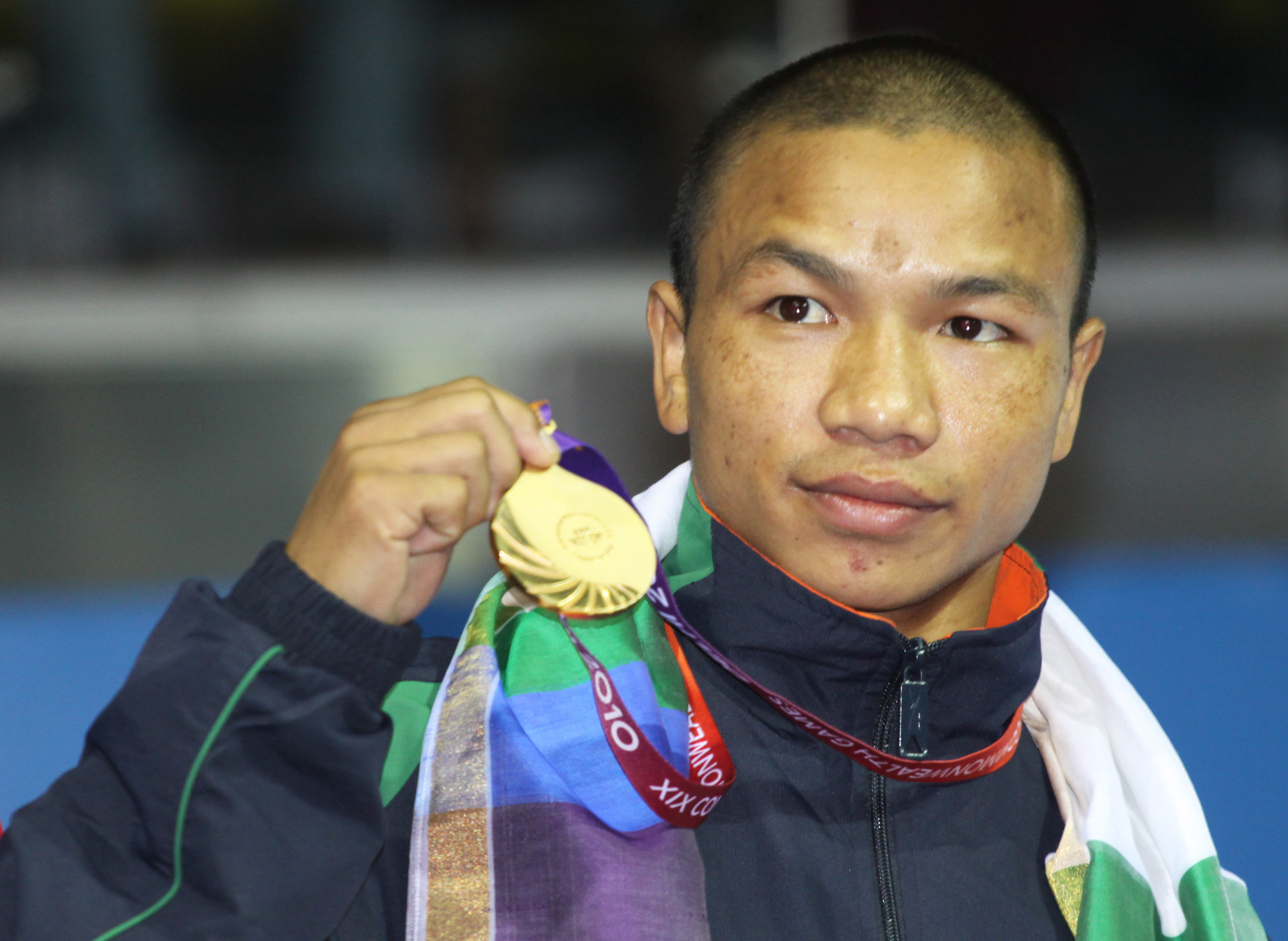
- Suranjoy of India won the Gold Medal in (Men’s) Boxing Fly Weight 52 kg Event, in New Delhi on 13 October 2010 at XIX Commonwealth Games-2010
- Born: 5 February 1986 (age 40)
- Citizenship: Indian
- Occupation: Boxer Flyweight
- Height: 162 cm (5 ft 4 in)

Suranjoy Singh
Medal record

Representing India

Men's Boxing

Commonwealth Games
Gold medal – first place	2010 Delhi	Flyweight

Asian Games
Bronze medal – third place	2010 Guangzhou	Flyweight

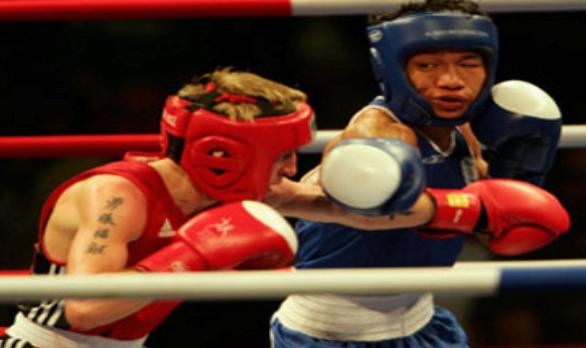
M Suranjoy Singh

Mayengbam Suranjoy Singh (born 2 April 1986) is an amateur boxer from Manipur, India. The diminutive pugilist is a livewire inside the ring and is known for his aggressive style. He is affectionately called by his team-mates as the Little Tyson.

== Career ==
In the initial years of his career, besides several gold medals at the State and National Level championships Suranjoy also won a bronze medal in 2004 at the Junior World Championship.

=== 2009 ===
The 24-year-old Manipuri lad also ended a 15-year wait for India by winning gold at the Asian Boxing Championships, at Zhuhai, China, in June 2009. He was also the lone Indian boxer to win a gold medal at that event. The last gold medal for India in the Asian championship came in the 1994 edition in Tehran where Rajkumar Sangwan finished on top in the super heavyweight category. He also became the first Indian boxer to win the gold medal in the 51 kg Flyweight Category at the Inter-Continental President's Cup in Baku, Azerbaijan in December 2009, the first-ever by an Indian in an Amateur International Boxing Association (AIBA) organised event. He was also the first Indian to be declared the 'best boxer' of any Senior Men's Boxing Championships at the world level. He is supported by Olympic Gold Quest.

2009 has been a memorable year for Suranjoy. Starting with the A K Mishra International event in Chandigarh, Suranjoy went on to finish at the top in the European Grand Prix, the Asian Championships and the President's Cup. In between he also claimed the national title in the flyweight category.

=== 2010 ===
He won a gold medal at the Commonwealth Boxing Championships held in New Delhi in March 2010. He won the flyweight gold medal at the 2010 Commonwealth Games in Delhi on 13 October 2010. In the final of the event, he won by a walkover after his opponent, Benson Njangiru of Kenya failed to show.
