= List of terrorist incidents in 2010 =

This is a timeline of incidents in 2010 that have been labelled, or investigated as possible cases of "terrorism" and are not believed to have been carried out by a government or its forces (see state terrorism and state-sponsored terrorism).

== List guidelines ==
- To be included, entries must be notable (have a stand-alone article) and described by a consensus of reliable sources as "terrorism".
- List entries must comply with the guidelines outlined in the manual of style under MOS:TERRORIST.
- Casualty figures in this list are the total casualties of the incident, including immediate casualties and later casualties (such as people who succumbed to their wounds long after the attacks occurred).
- Casualties listed are the victims. Perpetrator casualties are listed separately (e.g. x (+y) indicate that x victims and y perpetrators were killed/injured).
- Casualty totals may be underestimated or unavailable due to a lack of information. A figure with a plus (+) sign indicates that at least that many people have died (e.g. 10+ indicates that at least 10 people have died) – the actual toll could be considerably higher.
- If casualty figures are 20 or more, they will be shown in **bold**. In addition, figures for casualties more than 50 will also be **underlined**.

== January ==
Date	Type	Dead	Injured	Location	Description	Perpetrator
January 1	Suicide bombing	105	100+	Lakki Marwat, Pakistan	2010 Lakki Marwat suicide bombing: A suicide car bomber drove his explosive-laden vehicle into a volleyball pitch as people gathered to watch a match.	Lone-wolf
January 8	Shooting	3	9	Cabinda, Angola	Togo national football team attack: Separatist gunmen ambushed the Togo football team bus while crossing the Congo border, killing the driver, the assistant manager and a journalist, and injuring nine people, mainly football players.	Front for the Liberation of the Enclave of Cabinda

Total incidents: 1

== February ==
Date	Type	Dead	Injured	Location	Description
February 3	Suicide bombing	10	70	Lower Dir, Pakistan	February 2010 Lower Dir bombing: A suicide bomber attacked a Pakistani Frontier Corps convoy. The US embassy said its military personnel had been training Pakistan's Frontier Corps in counter-insurgency.
February 10	Assassination	1	0	Kfar Tapuach, West Bank	Tapuah Junction stabbing (2010): A Palestinian Authority police officer stabbed to death a Druze Arab IDF soldier while he was sitting in a jeep stopped at a traffic light at the Tapuah junction.
February 13	Bombing	16	60	Pune, India	2010 Pune bombing: A bomb exploded at the German Bakery, a famous and touristic eatery.
February 18	Suicide attack	1 (+1)	13	Austin, Texas, United States	2010 Austin suicide attack: Andrew Joseph Stack III crashed his plane into an IRS building killing himself and a person inside the building. The crash caused a serious fire and significant damage to the building.
February 26	Suicide bombing; possible offensive fighting	17	32	Kabul, Afghanistan	February 2010 Kabul attack: A suicide bomber detonated in an area containing a shopping centre, guest house and hotel, with gunfire heard after at least two blasts.

Total incidents: 5

== March ==
Date	Type	Dead	Injured	Location	Description
March 8–12	Suicide bombing	72+	190+	Lahore, Pakistan	March 2010 Lahore bombings: Three suicide bombings occurred on two separate days, in which a car bomb struck a Federal Investigation Agency's office, and the other two suicide bombers detonated simultaneously whilst targeting a passing military convoy.
March 29	Suicide bombing	40	100+	Moscow, Russia	2010 Moscow Metro bombings: Two female Shahidka suicide bombers detonated their explosive-belts on the Moscow Metro at the peak of the morning rush hour.
March 31	Suicide bombing	12	25	Kizlyar, Russia	2010 Kizlyar suicide bombings: A suicide car bomber detonated outside the offices of the local interior ministry and the FSB intelligence agency. Another suicide bomber impersonating as a police officer then detonated 20 minutes later on the same street as a crowd gathered.

Total incidents: 3

== April ==
Date	Type	Dead	Injured	Location	Description
April 4	Suicide car bombing	42	224	Baghdad, Iraq	April 4, 2010 Baghdad bombings: Three suicide car bombers hit in the centre of Baghdad. One explosion occurred near the Iranian embassy while the other two explosions occurred in the west-central Mansour district. The Islamic State of Iraq claimed responsibility for the attacks. It has also been reported that at least one of these blasts struck near the offices of pro-Iranian politician, Ahmed Chalabi.
April 19	Suicide bombing	25+	30+	Peshawar, Pakistan	19 April 2010 Peshawar bombing: A suicide bomber detonated his explosives at a marketplace during a public protest.
April 23	Bombing	85	145+	Anbar, Baghdad, Iraq	April 2010 Baghdad bombings: A wave of bomb attacks occurred across the Baghdad. Most of these attacks were near Shia mosques during prayers; one bomb went off near the offices of a prominent Shia cleric. Another attack involved a series of coordinated bombs being detonated in Khaldiya in Anbar province. Reports claimed the attacks were retaliation for the killings of three senior Al-Qaeda leaders by Iraqi security forces.

Total incidents: 3

== May ==
Date	Type	Dead	Injured	Location	Description
May 1	Attempted bombing	0	0	New York City, United States	2010 Times Square car bombing attempt: A car bomb was placed at Times Square but failed to detonate. Several days later, a Pakistani-American male was arrested in connection with the bombing attempt. He also had ties with the Taliban.
May 20	Shooting	2 (+2)	2	West Memphis, United States	2010 West Memphis police shootings: Two police officers were shot and killed during a traffic stop. Police identified and killed two suspects, identified as Jerry Kane, Jr., and his son, Joseph Kane.
May 28	Grenades, shooting	94	120+	Lahore, Pakistan	2010 Ahmadiyya mosques massacre: This terrorist attack took place on two Ahmadi mosques simultaneously.

Total incidents: 3

== July ==
Date	Type	Dead	Injured	Location	Description
July 1	Suicide bombing	50	200+	Lahore, Pakistan	July 2010 Lahore bombings: Two suicide bombers blew themselves up.
July 2	Bombing	1	11	Kosovska Mitrovica, Serbia	2010 Mitrovica attacks: A bomb exploded during a demonstration against the opening of a government office in the Serbian enclave. The only fatality was a Bosniak who lived in the Bosnian Mahal.
July 7	Suicide bombing	70+	400+	Baghdad, Iraq	July 2010 Baghdad attacks: A suicide bomber killed more than 70 people and some 400 have been wounded in bomb attacks on Shia pilgrims converging on a shrine.
July 9	Suicide bombing	105	120+	Mohmand Agency, Pakistan	Mohmand Agency bombing: A suicide bomb attack at a tribal meeting killed at least 104 people and wounded more than 120. This was the deadliest attack in the country so far in 2010.
July 12	Bombing	74	70	Kampala, Uganda	2010 Kampala attacks: Several suicide bombings were carried out around crowds watching the World Cup.
July 15	Suicide bombing	28	300+	Zahedan, Sistan and Baluchistan Province, Iran	2010 Zahedan bombings: Two suicide bombers at Shi'ite mosque by Sunni–Baloch group Jundullah.
July 28	Bombing	0	1	Strait of Hormuz	MV M. Star - Wikipedia: An explosion the oil tanker the M. star while it was sailing through the Strait of Hormuz.

Total incidents: 7

== August ==
Date	Type	Dead	Injured	Location	Description
August 17	Suicide bombing	69+	170+	Baghdad, Iraq	17 August 2010 Baghdad bombings: At least 69 people killed and more than 170 injured in a suicide attack on an army recruitment centre.
August 25	Suicide bombings/Car bombings/IEDs	53+	270+	Iraq	25 August 2010 Iraq bombings: A series of suicide bombings, car bombings and IED attacks occurred across various cities and towns across the country.
August 31	Fighting	4	0	Kiryat Arba, West Bank, Israel	August 2010 West Bank shooting attack: 4 Israeli civilians, including a pregnant woman, were killed by Hamas militants while driving on route 60. Witnesses say the victims were gunned down in their seats. Israeli sources described the incident as one of the "worst" acts of terror in recent years by Palestinian militants.

Total incidents: 3

== September ==
Date	Type	Dead	Injured	Location	Description
September 1	Suicide bombing	38	250	Lahore, Pakistan	September 2010 Lahore bombings: Three bombings killed 25 and injured 170.
September 3	Suicide bombing	73+	200+	Quetta, Pakistan	September 2010 Quetta bombing: Two suicide bombings against a Shiite's Quds Day procession and an Ahmadi mosque killed several people.
September 10	Bombing (alleged)	0	1	Copenhagen, Denmark	Hotel Jørgensen explosion: In an incident suggested to be terror-related aimed at newspaper Morgenavisen Jyllands-Posten's office in Aarhus, a man of Chechnyan origin allegedly caused an explosion in the basement of a Copenhagen hotel. After the unsuccessful attack, the perpetrator fled to the nearby Ørstedsparken, where he was caught by police. The police feared that the man had an undetonated bomb in his backpack and avoided coming near the man, until the detonation machine known as "Rullemarie", shot at the backpack to confirm that the content was harmless.
September 16	Bombing	12	3	Hakkâri Province, Turkey	2010 Hakkâri bus bombing: An attack occurred when a remote-controlled device exploded, on a minibus in the village of Gecitli near the borders with Iraq and Iran. 12 people died, and another 3 were injured.

Total incidents: 4

== October ==
Date	Type	Dead	Injured	Location	Description
October 1	Bombing	12	17	Abuja, Nigeria	October 2010 Abuja bombings: Two car bombings occurred during celebrations marking the 50th anniversary of the nation's independence.
October 19	Offensive fighting/Suicide bombing	6~20+	17~40+	Grozny, Chechnya, Russia	2010 Chechen Parliament attack: Three suicide militant commandos attacked and stormed into the Chechen Parliament, killing police officers and employees, before detonating their explosive-belts.
October 29	Bombing attempt	0	0	London, United Kingdom/Dubai, United Arab Emirates	2010 transatlantic aircraft bomb plot: Two packages, each containing a bomb consisting of 300 to 400 grams (11–14 oz) of plastic explosives and a detonating mechanism, were found on separate cargo planes. The bombs were discovered as a result of intelligence received from Saudi Arabia's security chief. They were bound from Yemen to the United States, and were discovered at en route stop-overs in London and Dubai.
October 31	Suicide bombing	0	32	Taksim Square, Istanbul, Turkey	2010 Istanbul bombing: A suicide bombing took place at 10:34.

Total incidents: 4

== November ==
Date	Type	Dead	Injured	Location	Description
November 11	Bombing, offensive fighting	18	100+	Karachi, Pakistan	Pakistan CID building attack: A truck laden with explosives was blasted at the CID building killing at least 18 and injuring more than 100. The blast was preceded by a gunfight between the militants and law enforcement officials.

Total incidents: 1

== December ==
Date	Type	Dead	Injured	Location	Description
December 11	Car Bombing, Suicide bombing	0 (+1 terrorist)	2	Stockholm, Sweden	2010 Stockholm bombings: Two explosions occurred, one triggered by a car bomb and another suicide bomb which likely killed the assailant. The bombings have been linked to e-mail threats over Swedish involvement in the War in Afghanistan and the ongoing Muhammed cartoon controversy.

Total incidents: 1

== See also ==
- List of Palestinian rocket attacks on Israel, 2010
- List of suicide bombings in Iraq in 2010
- List of major terrorist incidents
- List of Islamist terrorist attacks in 2010
