= Shaheed Benazir Bhutto International Boxing Tournament =

Boxing competition

The Shaheed Benazir Bhutto International Boxing Tournament took place in the KPT Benazir Sports Complex in Karachi, Pakistan from 1–8 January 2010. Amir Khan, the professional British boxing world champion of Pakistani descent was the guest in the final rounds of tournament.

Pakistan Boxing Federation Organized the Event with the support of a Local Company, Media gurus run by Mr Umer Toor & his associates.

== Participating countries ==
- Pakistan
- Afghanistan
- Bangladesh
- China
- Cameroon
- Central African Republic
- Hungary
- Singapore
- Sri Lanka
- Iraq
- India
- Kenya
- Syria
- Myanmar
- Mongolia
- Indonesia
- Taiwan
- Thailand
- Vietnam
- Yemen
- Uzbekistan
- United Arab Emirates

== Results ==
- Light Flyweight (48 kg): Mohib Bacha (Pakistan) bt Nadir Baloch (Pakistan)
- Flyweight (51 kg): Anan Pongkhet (Thailand) bt Abdul Waheed (Pakistan)
- Bantamweight (54 kg): Yong Dang (China) bt J Otgonbayar (Mongolia)
- Featherweight (57 kg): Donchai Thathi (Thailand) bt Wessam Salamana (Syria)
- Lightweight (60 kg): Ibrahim Sanda (Syria) bt Adnan Hussain (Pakistan)
- Light Welterweight (64 kg): B Tuvshinbat (Mongolia) bt Mashhurbek Ruziyev (Uzbekistan)
- Welterweight (69 kg): Mulema Joseph (Cameroon) bt Ahmed B Jassem (Iraq)
- Middleweight (75 kg): Moutafa Fara (Syria) bt Sile Hu (China)
- Light Heavyweight (81 kg): Fanlong Meng (China) bt Imre Szello (Hungary)
- Heavyweight (91 kg): Xuan Bao (China) bt Mustafa Mohammad (Iraq)
- Super Heavyweight (+91): Heshuai Li (China) bt Ghson Ahmad (Syria)

== Other activities ==
Nine African boxers belongs to Central Africa Republic and Cameron embraced Islam while staying in city.
