= Timeline of the War in Iraq (2017) =

This is a timeline of events during the War in Iraq of 2013 to 2017 in its final year.

== Chronology ==
=== January ===
- 2 January –
  - January 2017 Baghdad bombings: A series of car bombings in Sadr City and other parts of Baghdad killed at least 56 people and injured more than 120 others.
  - Gunmen wearing suicide vests attacked two police stations in the central Iraqi city of Samarra, killing at least 7 officers.
- 5 January – A car bombing at a food market in the al-Obeidi area in Baghdad killed 9 people and left 15 others wounded. After nightfall a suicide car bomber killed 11 and injured 22 near a security checkpoint in Bab al-Muadam. Several smaller attacks around the city killed 7 people and injured 20 others.
- 6 January – A police checkpoint near Tikrit was attacked by suicide bombers and a car bomb. Four police officers and two attackers were killed, while 12 others were injured.
- 8 January – Islamic State claimed responsibility for a pair of suicide car bombings in Baghdad. At least 20 were killed and more than 50 others were injured.
- 11 January – A car bomb detonated in the al-Bayaa district of Baghdad, killing one person and wounding five others.
- 14 January – Islamic State militants burned a family of five people (a mother and four children) in Kirkuk.
- 16 January – One person was killed and five others were wounded when two explosive devices exploded in Baghdad.
- 18 January – A car bomb blast hit the mostly Shi'ite neighborhood of Abu Dsheer in Baghdad.
- 20 January – An Iraqi elder and his grandson were killed in western Mosul in an explosion caused by a bomb dropped from an Islamic State guided drone.
- 24 January – the Eastern half of Mosul city had been liberated from ISIL control, and the Iraqi Army began advancing into Western Mosul soon after.
- 25 January – Two explosions caused by car bombs killed two civilians and wounded nine others in the Iraqi capital.
- 26 January –
  - A bombing at a market in south Baghdad killed one person and wounded five others. Earlier in the day, an attack on a militia-held checkpoint killed one and injured three.
  - An Islamic State drone dropped explosives on a house in central Mosul wounding three members of the same family
- 28 January –
  - A bomb kills one and another four were injured in Baghdad.
  - A suicide bombing in Fallujah kills at least two police officers and another two were injured.
- 30 January –
  - An explosion killed one person and wounded four near a market in southern Baghdad.
  - An explosion in Mosul left at least three children dead.

=== February ===
- 1 February – The Islamic State executed five civilians in Hawija.
- 2 February – An explosion killed one person and wounded three near a market in southern Baghdad. Another bombing earlier wounded two civilians.
- 7 February – The Islamic State executed fifteen civilians in a village north of Mosul.
- 8 February –
  - The Islamic State executed twenty civilians in Mosul by burning them for alleged collaboration with Iraqi security forces. Seven Islamic State fighters were also executed for desertion.
  - One person was killed and nineteen were wounded by Islamic State drone strikes.
  - A roadside bomb blast killed two Iraqi troops in western Iraq on Wednesday, according to a military officer. The explosion struck as a military vehicle was passing on a highway in western Ramadi, the provincial capital of Anbar province.
- 9 February – Nine persons were killed in two rocket attacks in east Mosul.
- 10 February – At least ten people were killed and 33 others wounded in a car bomb explosion in the Iraqi capital of Baghdad.
- 12 February – Islamic State militants burned to death 15 civilians in Kirkuk, including children, for attempted to escape territory they control.
- 13 February – The Islamic State shelled a school north of Mosul killing three students and a teacher, and wounding 24 others.
- 15 February –
  - Several bombings killed eighteen people and wounded at least 30 including a car bomb near a market in baghdad that killed five and wounded 20.
  - Three people were killed and four were wounded by an Islamic State drone strike in eastern Mosul.
  - The Islamic State executed 13 civilians by drowning them in metal cages in Mosul.
  - The Islamic State executed 8 civilians in Hawija.
- 16 February – At least 59 people were killed and more than 60 others were wounded in a car bomb explosion at a car dealership in Baghdad.
- 17 February – Islamic State militants attacked a Popular Mobilization Forces battalion headquarters southeast of Tikrit, killing eight militia members and injuring an unknown number.
- 19 February –
  - Iraqi Prime Minister Haider al-Abadi, announced the start of the operation to capture western Mosul.
  - Two persons were killed by an Islamic State suicide bomber in eastern Mosul.
- 20 February –
  - Islamic State drones and rocket shelling killed 11 civilians in areas recaptured by security forces in eastern Mosul.
  - An IED bombing at a market killed one person and wounded four in western Baghdad.
- 21 February –
  - A car bombing in the southwestern Baghdad neighborhood of Amiriya killed 7 civilians and injured at least 30 others.
  - A police officer was executed by Islamic State militants.
- 24 February – Islamic State militants attacked an Iraqi border crossing outside of Rutba with a suicide car bomb and gunmen. 15 soldiers were killed including 2 officers. No reports on injuries.
- 25 February – Four bombs blew up near a pipeline in Kirkuk. One member of the Peshmerga was killed and two others were wounded.
- 26 February – Prominent Rudaw Media Network journalist Shifa Gardi was killed along with a Popular Mobilization Forces commander and four militia fighters while she was conducting a report on a suspected mass grave south of Mosul. At least 8 others were injured in the roadside bombing, including Gardi's cameraman.

=== March ===
- 1 March – Seven civilians were wounded due to Islamic State chemical attack on western Mosul.
- 4 March – An improvised explosive device exploded, at noon, near a popular market in al-Shaab area, north of Baghdad, wounding two civilians.
- 6 March –
  - 4 civilians were killed and 25 others were injured due to Islamic State chemical attack on western Mosul.
  - Islamic State executed eight civilians in Kirkuk.
- 9 March – 30 civilians were killed and 26 others were injured by two suicide bombers at a wedding in Tikrit, Iraq.
- 20 March – A car bombing killed 23 people and injured more than 40 others in a commercial area of the southwestern Hayy Al-A'amel suburb.
- 29 March – A suicide truck bomber targeted a police checkpoint in southern Baghdad, killing 17 people and injuring at least 60 others.
- 27 March – the American-led coalition conducted a bombing of the al-Aghawat al-Jadidah neighborhood in Western Mosul on 17 March 2017 that killed hundreds of civilians.

=== April ===
- 2 April – Two improvised explosive devices (IED) injured six Peshmerga troops in west of Tuz Khurmatu, south of Kirkuk.
- 3 April – Three police personnel were killed and seven troops – four police personnel and three army soldiers – were injured in a suicide bombing in Iraq's western city of Fallujah, according to a local military officer.
- 5 April –
  - 2017 Tikrit attacks: Insurgents kills at least 35 people, including 14 security forces. The attack occurred in Tikrit and was claimed by Islamic State.
  - Seven people were killed in three bombings in Baghdad. The first bombing was planted in a fish market, and three civilians were killed. Four others were also injured. In the second bombing, a civilian was killed and another was injured. In the third bombing, three people were killed and seven injured when a roadside bomb went off amid a group of construction workers.
  - An attack occurred in Baquba: two police officers were killed and four others were injured.
  - A device exploded at a fish market in Yusufiya, south of Baghdad, killing three people and injuring four others, police officer told.
- 6 April – A bomb kills 1 and another 8 were injured.
- 7 April – Bombing left one dead and another three were wounded in Southern Baghdad.
- 10 April –
  - A lone wolf terrorist kills at least 12 people in Kirkuk, Iraq.
  - A bomb kills at least one and another 4 were wounded in North Baghdad.
- 11 April – Militants from Islamic State of Iraq and the Levant kills at least 7 people and another 13 were injured. All victims were civilians.
- 12 April – A bomb kills one and 4 others were injured in southeastern baghdad.
- 13 April –
  - Insurgent kills at least 2 people in Diyala. All victims were policemen.
  - Terrorist kills at least 1, leaves 4 more injured in southern baghdad.
- 15 April – A bomb kills one and another were injured in a village northeastern of Diyala.
- 18 April – A suicide car bombing killed at least 16 civilians in Mosul's al-Thawra district. The bomber attempted to target military units nearby, but having failed to breach security, detonated the vehicle in a nearby alley instead.
- 23 April – Islamic State militants ambushed a convoy carrying soldiers, border guards and local police officers just outside of Ar-Rutbah, killing 10 and injuring 20 others.
- 28 April – A suicide car bomb attack on a traffic police compound in central Baghdad Friday killed at least four people and wounded six.

=== May ===
- 2 May –
  - Gunmen killed Younis and his assistant in the Wahid Hozairan Neighborhood located in southern Kirkuk.
  - Fighters from ISIS have killed at least 10 Iraqi soldiers in the country's western province of Anbar, according to officials.
- 3 May –
  - Two policemen were killed in a suicide bombing by IS terrorists in Iraq's northern Saladin province, according to a local military source.
  - A teacher was killed as a bomb placed under a vehicle exploded in western Baghdad. In another blast, two persons were wounded as a bomb exploded in Nahrawan district, southeast of Baghdad.
- 5 May –
  - An improvised explosive device (IED) in the south of Kirkuk Province killed a Peshmerga officer and wounded two other soldiers.
  - A suicide bomber, driving a car bomb, blew himself up in the center of Haditha, killing five people and wounding eight others.
- 6 May – Two civilians were killed, three others were wounded in two blasts that occurred in west of Baghdad.
- 7 May – Two Kurdish soldiers were killed in an Islamic State attack on a military base in Kirkuk in northern Iraq.
- 8 May –
  - Two policemen were killed due to an IED blast, south of Ramadi city.
  - A police officer was killed by a group of gunmen at the outskirts of Baquba city.
- 9 May –
  - Islamic State members executed 47 of their prisoners in Kirkuk's Hawija, including 12 of their comrades.
  - Two civilians died and two others were wounded Tuesday when an explosive device went off north of the city of Ramadi.
  - One person was killed and three others were wounded when a bomb blast rocked an area in southwestern Baghdad.
- 10 May – An employee of Education Ministry was killed as a bomb exploded in al-Zidan region in abu Ghraib district, western Baghdad.
- 11 May –
  - One policeman was killed when an armed individual shot at him north of Kirkuk.
  - Four persons were killed and ten injured as a booby-trapped vehicle exploded on Thursday in al-Sho'la district, east of Baghdad.
- 12 May – A child and her parents died as a mortar shell, believed to be from Islamic State militants, landed on their house.
- 13 May – A soldier was killed, while a paramilitary personnel was injured as result of an IED blast.
- 14 May – A booby-trapped car exploded near a bridge of al-Rubaie street, leaving one person killed and five others wounded.
- 15 May –
  - 4 bombers were sneaking into the town of Haditha, west of Anbar, however, three of the suicide bombers were trapped inside a house and killed by security, while the fourth blew himself up killing two security members.
  - One member of Sunni tribal groups fighting the Islamic State was killed Monday and another was wounded when gunmen attacked their deployment south of Baghdad.
- 16 May – One person died and two others were wounded when an explosive device went off in northern Baghdad.
- 17 May – Iraqi forces recapture between 70% ~ 90% of the Western half of Mosul city. Early end to Battle of Mosul suspected.
- 18 May –
  - One civilian was killed and three others were injured when an explosive device planted near a popular market in al-Nasr wal Salam area in Abu Gharib, west of Baghdad, went off. Another bomb exploded near commercial stores in Sakalat, also west of Baghdad, killing one civilian and wounding five others.
  - A suicide attack took place as a bomber wearing explosive belt targeted a popular market in Tuz Khurmatu, leaving nine civilians killed and eleven others injured.
- 19 May – A civilian was killed and three others were injured due to a bomb blast that occurred near a market in southern Baghdad.
- 20 May –
  - 35 persons were killed and 45 others were injured in four suicide attacks in Baghdad.
  - A suicide bombing near the oil-rich city of Basra killed five civilians and three troops.
- 21 May –
  - A soldier was killed, another was injured in an IED blast that targeted an army patrol in Baghdad.
  - At least 17 Iraqi soldiers were killed in suicide attacks by Daesh militants in the northern city of Mosul.
- 22 May –
  - At least six soldiers were killed and around fifteen others were injured in an attack on a military base in eastern Iraq.
  - Two civilians were killed in an armed attack that occurred near a village, northeast of Baquba.
  - Islamic State militants executed nine men from Hawija district and areas in its vicinity over collaboration with security services.
  - A bomb placed near a market in al-Nasr wal Salam region in Abu Ghraib district, western Baghdad, exploded leaving three civilians injured.
- 30 May – Al-Faqma ice cream parlor bombing: At least 30 people were killed and 40 more injured when a car bomb detonated while they were outside an ice cream shop. ISIS claimed responsibility.

=== June ===
- 1 June – Sixteen Iraqis were killed and wounded in Diyala in separate attacks and bombings in the province, according to security sources.
- 2 June – One Iraqi army soldier was killed and another was wounded on Friday when an explosive device went off in western Baghdad.
- 3 June – One soldier was killed, while two others were wounded due to an attack launched by Islamic State militants against checkpoint located east of Abu Saida town in Diyala Governorate.
- 5 June – Five members of one family were killed and injured as a mortar shell fell on their house in western Baghdad.
- 7 June –
  - Nine civilians, including children, were killed in a suicide attack that took place in central Hit, west of Iraq.
  - Eleven Iraqi soldiers were killed, while seven others were wounded due to an explosion of a booby-trapped house in western Mosul district.
- 8 June –
  - Thirteen civilians were killed, while eight others, including Islamic State militants, were wounded in violent attacks that occurred in several regions in Diyala.
  - A civilian was killed and two others were wounded in an armed attack in Balad District, south of Tikrit.
- 9 June –
  - A woman detonated her explosive belt in a market east of the Shi'ite holy city of Karbala on Friday, killing at least 30 and wounding 35.
  - A policeman was killed, five others were wounded as two bomb blasts took place south of Baghdad.
- 11 June – A suicide attacker killed two and wounded five others in an attack launched midnight against security checkpoint in Diyala Governorate.
- 16 June – A civilian was killed and three others were wounded when a bomb blast rocked an area north of Baghdad.
- 19 June –
  - Three journalists including (two French and a Kurdish) have died following a blast in the Iraqi city of Mosul.
  - One paramilitary fighter was killed and two others were wounded when an explosive device went off in southern Baghdad.
- 22 June – Two persons were killed, while four others were wounded as a booby-trapped vehicle exploded in west of Baghdad.
- 23 June –
  - One Iraqi soldier and eight civilians were killed when an Islamic State suicide bomber blew himself up west of Anbar.
  - A suicide bomber blew himself up among civilians fleeing Mosul's Old City, killing twelve and wounding more than twenty.
  - Three suicide bombers blew themselves up in an east Mosul district, killing five including three policemen.
  - Up to three people were killed and five others injured in a car bomb explosion in eastern Baghdad.
- 24 June – Ten people were killed and six others wounded in a roadside bomb explosion while fleeing their homes in a town seized by Islamic State militants in Iraq's northern Kirkuk province.
- 26 June – One security member and a civilian were killed and an officer was wounded in two attempted and fatal suicide bombings in Babil province.
- 28 June –
  - Four Peshmerga soldiers have been injured when an explosive device went off in Kirkuk.
  - Two suicide bombers were killed before blowing themselves up at a wedding in Al Anbar Governorate.
  - A civilian was killed and three others wounded when a roadside bomb exploded north of Ramadi.
- 30 June – At least 10 Iraqi soldiers and pro-government fighters were killed in a Daesh attack near border with Syria.

=== July ===
- 2 July – 19 people were killed and 13 injured after a suicide bomber attacked a camp for displaced persons in western Anbar, Iraq.
- 3 July –
  - An Iraqi army soldier was killed while another one was wounded when armed attackers shot at their patrol in western Baghdad.
  - One civilian was killed and three others were injured when a bomb blast rocked an area in southern Baghdad.
  - Three civilians were killed, two others were injured due to a blast caused by a bomb planted by the Islamic State in Hawija, southwest of Kirkuk.
- 7 July –
  - Eleven people have been killed and injured in clashes and two explosions in Baghdad.
  - Two Iraqi journalists and a policeman were killed on Friday in an attack by the Islamic State militants, south of Mosul.
- 10 July –
  - The Iraqi Army declares victory in the Battle of Mosul.
  - A family of six members were killed and injured due to a bomb blast that targeted families fleeing Islamic State-held Hawija.
  - Seven children are executed and hung from lamp posts by the Islamic State.
- 11 July –
  - An explosive device went off killing a civilian and injuring another in Al Khalis town in Diyala Governorate.
  - The Islamic State executed three fighters belonging to al-Hashd al-Shaabiin the Imam Gharbi village an al-Qayara neighborhood.
  - A Soldier was killed and three others wounded in an improvised explosive device (IED) explosion in western Ramadi.
  - Four pro-government fighters were killed by a roadside bomb near Tal Afar city in northern Iraq, according to an Iraqi military officer. The device struck a vehicle carrying fighters from the Shia Hashd al-Shaabi militia near the city, Mohammed al-Shufani told.
- 12 July – Three explosive devices went off, killing a soldier and injuring five others in north eastern Baqubah.
- 13 July –
  - Seventeen security members were killed and nine others wounded when two suicide bombers attacked the headquarters of a paramilitary tribal fighters in the province of Anbar in western Iraq.
  - Two bombings in different locations of Baghdad leave one dead, and five injured.
- 14 July – A policeman was killed and another was wounded as a bomb blast targeted their patrol in western Baghdad.
- 15 July – Two car bombings in different locations of Baghdad leave two dead, and seven injured.
- 16 July – A bomb, placed under a car of a civil servant who works for Health Ministry, exploded as he was passing on the highway in Abu Ghraib region in western Baghdad, which caused his immediate death.
- 17 July – A woman was killed when Islamic State militants raided her home in northeast of Diyala governorate and kidnapped two of her sons.
- 18 July –
  - An Iraqi soldier was killed and another was wounded on Tuesday when a bomb exploded north of Baghdad.
  - A civil defence officer was killed and three of his assistants were wounded as an improvised explosive device (IED) exploded while searching for survivors under rubble in the Old City of Mosul.
  - ISIS militants stormed a village in northwestern Kirkuk, killing five people and capturing five others.
  - Four al-Hashd al-Shaabi (the Popular Mobilization Forces) fighters were killed in clashes with Islamic State militants near Tal Afar west of Mosul.
  - Four Federal Police personnel were injured in an armed attack, south of Tikrit.
- 19 July –
  - A bomb placed under a civilian's car exploded at Sabaa al-Bour region in north of Baghdad, causing the driver's immediate death.
  - Three Iraqi policemen were killed in a suicide bombing in the Old City of Mosul.
- 20 July –
  - Eight children and women were killed or injured when a roadside bomb exploded on their way out of Islamic State strongholds southwest of Kirkuk.
  - An Islamic State suicide bomber drove a booby-trapped car into a checkpoint run by the Iraqi army in al-Baaj region, near the borders with Syria, killing three soldiers.
  - A member of Baghdad governorate council was assassinated by militants who used guns with silencers in Karrada, Baghdad.
- 21 July – A bomb, placed on the side of the highway at al-Taji region, north of Baghdad, exploded leaving three civilians injured.
- 22 July – A policeman's wife was injured in a bomb blast in al-Jahiza region, west of Baqubah.
- 23 July –
  - Five civilians were killed, while nine others were wounded in an IED blast in northwest of Baqubah.
  - An IED, planted on the side of a road in Radwaniyah area, west of Baghdad, exploded, leaving two civilians wounded.
  - A bomb, placed near a popular playground in Bawi region in al-Mada’in district, exploded, leaving two civilians wounded.
  - Anbar police arrested driver of a vehicle, which was revealed to be booby-trapped, at al-Halabsa region, at the western entrance of Fallujah city. The vehicle exploded while being handled, leaving a lieutenant general and another officer killed and a third policeman injured.
- 24 July –
  - An army officer was killed as an IED blast occurred while defusing the bomb in western Anbar.
  - Two Peshmerga fighters were injured as an improvised explosive device (IED) exploded near their patrol in western Diyala.
  - A parked booby-trapped vehicle exploded in Bab Sinjar market, in Mosul, targeting security troops and civilians, leaving four civilians killed and three others, including two policemen, wounded.
- 25 July –
  - A police officer was killed and seven others were wounded in two different explosions in Baghdad.
  - Assailants opened fire against a police officer while returning home by his own car in Al Dawaya area, northern Dhi Qar.
  - Gunmen shot Kurdish MPs Riad Korshed and Azad shahed in Kirkuk Governorate, killing the first and injuring the second.
  - Two personnel of the Shia-led paramilitary troops were killed, while three others were wounded as booby-trapped vehicle targeted a checkpoint, east of Tikrit city.
  - Four security personnel were killed as Islamic State attacked troops at a market in western Mosul.
  - Islamic State executed ten members, including Arab leaders, west of Mosul.
- 26 July – A civilian was killed, while three others were wounded as a mortar missile fell on west of Baghdad. Moreover, three civilians were wounded in an IED blast in southern Baghdad.
- 27 July –
  - A policeman was killed, while head of police station was injured in a suicide attack against Amiriyat al-Fallujah police station.
  - Two women died and three men were wounded in two consecutive IED explosions in Diyala province.
- 28 July – Iraqi security forces killed four suicide bombers while a fifth one killed a whole family of six west of Anbar.
- 29 July –
  - A tribal fighter was killed, while another one was injured in an armed attack against checkpoint in southern Baghdad.
  - Three civilians were killed, while seven others were injured as an IED blast exploded in a residential district in a village, southeast of Mosul.
- 30 July –
  - A fighter belonging to al-Hashd al-Ashaeri (Tribal Mobilization Forces) was killed in an armed attack in northern Baghdad.
  - Two Iraqi soldiers were killed when a booby-trapped vehicle exploded in their patrol in the west of the country.
- 31 July – A policeman was killed and two others were wounded when a roadside bomb exploded northeast of Baqubah.

=== August ===
- 1 August – A policeman was killed as a physically challenged member and two women belonging to the Islamic State (IS) attacked a check point. One of the attackers was killed, and the two others were arrested.
- 2 August –
  - A Kurdish Peshmerga fighter was killed in an IED blast in the north of Diyala Governorate.
  - Three Iraqi soldiers were killed in an IED blast northeast of Baqubah.
  - A bomb, planted by Islamic State militants inside a house, exploded, killing two civilians and injuring a third in Mosul.
- 3 August – An Iraqi officer was killed, while another went missing in an ambush set up by Islamic State militants, south of Nineveh Governorate.
- 4 August –
  - IS members attacked a Peshmerga patrol in al-Touz region, east of Saladin Governorate, killing an officer and two lower-ranking soldiers, and wounding a fourth officer.
  - A suicide bomber killed three Iraqi army members as operations continue to clear Islamic State remnant militants in western Mosul.
- 5 August –
  - An Iraqi army officer was killed and five soldiers were injured when an explosive device went off west of Baqubah, Diyala Governorate.
  - An IED went off inside a cemetery in Ramadi during a funeral ceremony, killing two and wounding three others.
- 6 August –
  - A civilian was killed, while another was injured in a bomb blast that occurred in Ras al-Jaddah district, in western Mosul.
  - A civilian was killed when an IED exploded in western Baghdad.
- 7 August –
  - Five civilians were killed, while seven others were wounded in several parts of Diyala Governorate in different mortar and IED attacks.
  - Six paramilitary fighters were killed and wounded in a double bombing north of Babil Governorate.
  - IS staged a three-pronged attack that included a suicide bombing, followed by fighters storming the positions of an Iraqi Shiite militia near the Iraq–Syria border. Amaq News Agency claimed 68 militiamen were killed.
- 8 August – A civilian was killed in an armed attack in the Iraqi capital Baghdad, while two others were wounded in an improvised explosive device (IED) explosion.
- 9 August –
  - Islamic State militants executed 27 civilians in their Kirkuk stronghold.
  - A civilian was killed as an improvised explosive device (IED) from the Islamic State (IS) exploded in the Old City of Mosul.
- 10 August –
  - Nine personnel of the Shia-led paramilitary troops were killed, while six others were wounded in an armed attack in western Anbar.
  - Two civilians were killed and three others were wounded on Thursday when Islamic State gunmen shot at them in western Mosul.
  - A civilian was killed and seven others were wounded in two separate explosions in Baghdad.
- 12 August –
  - Four civilians were killed and nine others were wounded in a bomb blast, targeting families fleeing IS-held areas, north of Saladin.
  - A civilian was killed in an armed attack, southeast of the capital, Baghdad.
  - Four civilians were killed and nine others were wounded in a bomb blast, targeting families fleeing IS-held areas in Saladin Governorate.
- 13 August –
  - At least two civilians have been injured in a car bomb explosion in Baghdad's Baldyat district.
  - Three Islamic State militants driving a booby-trapped vehicle blew themselves up, killing one soldier at Maamal al-Isment (cement factory) on the road between Karbala and Al Anbar Governorates.
  - Four police personnel were killed in an ambush set by Islamic State militants east of Diyala Governorate.
- 14 August –
  - Three civilians were killed and injured in different areas in Mosul city in three separate attacks.
  - A policeman was killed in an armed attack in north of Kirkuk Governorate.
- 15 August –
  - A civilian died and another sustained injuries when an explosive device exploded in a district in southwestern Baghdad.
  - A whole family composed of five members were killed in a bomb blast, northeast of Diyala Governorate.
  - Two Federal Police personnel were killed and injured in an armed attack in western Mosul.
- 16 August –
  - A civilian was killed, while another was wounded as an IED exploded east of Diyala Governorate.
  - Several suicide attackers sneaked into security facilities in north of Biji, where clashes occurred against police personnel, leaving nine personnel and four attackers killed, while other policemen were injured.
- 17 August – Islamic State militants executed three brothers in western Anbar for refusing to join the group.
- 18 August –
  - Islamic State militants killed a police officer and his family members after invading his home in northwestern Kirkuk.
  - Four people were wounded on Friday when an explosive device went off in the southeast of Baghdad.
- 19 August –
  - A university professor and a soldier were killed, while another was wounded in two IED blasts in western Baghdad.
  - Nine civilians were killed and wounded as a landmine, planted by Islamic State, exploded in Nineveh.
- 20 August –
  - A soldier was killed, while another was wounded as a booby-trapped vehicle exploded at a checkpoint in Salahdin Governorate.
  - Five civilians were killed and injured as an IED exploded in western Baghdad.
  - Iraqi Prime Minister Haider al-Abadi, announced the start of the offensive to capture Tal Afar.
- 21 August – A civilian was killed, while two soldiers were wounded in two IED blasts in northern Baghdad.
- 23 August – Two soldiers were wounded as unknown gunmen attacked their patrol in the south of the capital Baghdad.
- 24 August –
  - One civilian was killed and three others were wounded when a bomb blast hit an area in western Baghdad.
  - Islamic State militants burned to death a family of eight, including an infant, for attempting to flee the group's stronghold in southwestern Kirkuk.
- 25 August – A senior officer was killed and four soldiers were wounded in two separate blasts in Anbar.
- 26 August –
  - A senior officer was killed, while five others were wounded in an explosion that occurred near common borders with Saudi Arabia.
  - A bomb planted under a civilian's vehicle exploded while the vehicle was at Shuhadaa al-Bayaa region in southwest of Baghdad. The citizen was killed immediately.
  - Six Kurdish Peshmerga were killed and wounded when an explosive device went off on the side of a road west of Kirkuk.
- 27 August –
  - At least six civilians were killed in two car bomb attacks, and a bomb blast in different zones of Baghdad.
  - An Iraqi cameraman was killed as an IED exploded while he was accompanying troops in their attacks against Islamic State militants in Tal Afar.
- 28 August – A car bomb went off near the busy Jamila wholesale market in Baghdad's Shiite district of Sadr City killing 12 people and wounding at least 28 others. Additionally, an IED exploded at al-Yusufiya region, in south of Baghdad, which caused death of four persons and injury of eight others. Another two civilians were wounded in an IED blast that occurred in northern Baghdad.
- 29 August – Two civilians were killed, while seven others were wounded as three blasts occurred at several regions in the capital Baghdad.
- 30 August – Five Hashd al-Shaabi fighters were killed—and three more injured—by two roadside bombs that went off in Iraq's recently liberated Tal Afar district.
- 31 August –
  - A civilian was killed, seven others, including army personnel, were wounded in two blasts that north and southwest of Baghdad. Additionally, three members of Tribal Mobilization groups were killed, while four others were wounded when armed attackers hurled a hand grenade on their checkpoint in Abu Gharib, west of the capital.
  - The Battle of Tal Afar ends with a major Iraqi Army victory.

=== September ===
- 2 September –
  - Suicide bombers killed seven people and wounded 12 in an attack on a power plant north of Baghdad.
  - Three people were wounded when a bomb blast hit an area in southeastern Baghdad.
- 3 September – A bomb, placed on the side of the road in Hor Rajab region, south of Baghdad, exploded on Sunday, causing injury of a civilian who was passing when the explosion took place.
- 4 September – Six civilians were wounded in an IED blast in southwestern Baghdad.
- 5 September –
  - Six persons were killed and injured in two blasts in north and west of Baghdad.
  - Ten Kurdish Peshmerga fighters were wounded in a roadside bomb blast west of Mosul.
  - A Muslim cleric survived an assassination attempt, leaving him wounded in Najaf. Three companions were also killed in the attack.
- 6 September – A soldier was killed, three others were wounded in an Islamic State attack launched against a security checkpoint in the south of Salahuddin.
- 7 September – An explosive device placed next to commercial shops in Diyala Bridge region went off, wounding two people. Hours later another explosive device, placed near a grocer's shop in Youssefiya, went off, killing one person and wounding four others.
- 8 September – Two blasts hit the south and the west of Baghdad, killing and injuring nine people. One of the bombs exploded in a market and the other blast targeted a police patrol.
- 9 September – Three civilians were killed, while three others were wounded in a bomb blast in eastern Baghdad.
- 10 September –
  - A civilian was killed, five others were wounded in a bomb blast that took place in southwest of Baghdad.
  - An Iraqi soldier died while trying to deactivate an explosive device west of the city of Ramadi.
- 12 September – A paramilitary fighter was killed and two others were wounded when a bomb exploded in a southern Baghdad area. Moreover, a civilian was killed, while another was injured in a bomb blast in east of the capital Baghdad.
- 13 September – An IED exploded near the industrial district in Besmaya village, located on Baghdad-Wasit road, which left a person killed and eight others wounded.
- 14 September – 2017 Nasiriyah attacks: An Islamic State attack caused at least 84 deaths and more than 90 injuries. The first attack struck close to a restaurant while shortly afterwards a car bomb targeted a security checkpoint in the same area, near Nasiriyah in the governorate of Dhi Qar.
- 16 September – The Iraqi Army started the Akashat Offensive the offensive is part of the main offensive Western Anbar offensive. Later in the day, Iraqi military announced that it had captured Akashat.
- 17 September – Twenty four people were killed when a booby-trap exploded in a school building west of Mosul, including twelve militants from Tribal Hashid, as they were training in that school.
- 18 September – A police member died and two army soldiers were wounded in two bomb blasts in eastern and southern Baghdad.
- 19 September –
  - A civilian was killed in a blast as a bomb, planted by Islamic State, exploded in south of Kirkuk.
  - The Iraqi Army started the Anah Offensive the offensive is part of the main offensive Western Anbar offensive.
- 20 September – The Iraqi Army launched an offensive to recapture Hawija.
- 21 September – The Iraqi Army captured the town of Anah, ending the Western Anbar offensive.
- 27 September – Islamic State militants attacked several positions held by Iraqi forces in Anbar province, killing at least 7 soldiers and wounding 16.
- 28 September – Ten civilians were executed by Islamic State militants in Hawija.

=== October ===
- 5 October – The Iraqi Army declares victory in the Battle of Hawija.
- 12 October – U.S. department of defence reports that the U.S., along with coalition forces, conducted four airstrikes on ISIS infrastructure and positions.
- 14 October – Five Iraqi soldiers were killed and 13 others injured after an Islamic State shooting attack in Tal Safuk, Iraq.
- 15 October – The Iraqi Army attacked the Peshmerga in the Kirkuk region and city also the 2017 Iraqi–Kurdish conflict started on that day as well.
- 16 October – ISIL militants attacked the villages Makha and Twelha in north of Kirkuk.
- 19 October – Roughly, 100,000 Kurds flee Kirkuk as Iraqi army takes control of it.
- 20 October – The Battle of Kirkuk ended with Iraqi victory.
- 26 October – The Iraqi Army launched their last campaign in Iraq against the Islamic State.

=== November ===
- 3 November - Iraqi forces enter the town of Al-Qa'im, one of the last towns held by ISIL.
- 5 November - Two suicide bombers attack a Shia mosque in Kirkuk, killing 5 people.
- 11 November -
  - The Iraqi Armed Forces begin an offensive to retake Rawa, the last stronghold by ISIL.
  - In Hawija, mass graves of over 400 bodies have been discovered.

=== December ===
- 9 December - The Iraqi government declares the war with ISIL to be over. The victory is welcomed by the US State Department, but they state the fight will still continue as a low-intensity insurgency.

== See also ==
- 2017 in Iraq
- Timeline of ISIL-related events (2017)
- Timeline of the War in Iraq (2014)
- Timeline of the War in Iraq (2015)
- Timeline of the War in Iraq (2016)
