= List of terrorist incidents in 2017 =

This is a list of terrorist incidents which took place in 2017, including attacks by violent non-state actors for political motives. Note that terrorism related to drug wars and cartel violence is not included in these lists. Ongoing military conflicts are listed separately.

== List guidelines ==
- To be included, entries must be notable (have a stand-alone article) and described by a consensus of reliable sources as "terrorism".
- List entries must comply with the guidelines outlined in the manual of style under MOS:TERRORIST.
- Casualties figures in this list are the total casualties of the incident including immediate casualties and later casualties (such as people who succumbed to their wounds long after the attacks occurred).
- Casualties listed are the victims. Perpetrator casualties are listed separately (e.g. x (+y) indicate that x victims and y perpetrators were killed/injured).
- Casualty totals may be underestimated or unavailable due to a lack of information. A figure with a plus (+) sign indicates that at least that many people have died (e.g. 10+ indicates that at least 10 people have died) – the actual toll could be considerably higher. A figure with a plus (+) sign may also indicate that over that number of people are victims.
- If casualty figures are 20 or more, they will be shown in **bold**. In addition, figures for casualties more than 50 will also be **underlined**.
- Incidents are limited to one per location per day. If multiple attacks occur in the same place on the same day, they will be merged into a single incident.
- In addition to the guidelines above, the table also includes the following categories:

0 people were killed/injured by the incident.
1–19 people were killed/injured by the incident.
20–49 people were killed/injured by the incident.
50–99 people were killed/injured by the incident.
100+ people were killed/injured by the incident.

== List ==
Total incidents: 100

Date	Type	Dead	Injured	Location	Article	Details	Perpetrator	Part of
Jan 1	Shooting	39	70	Istanbul, Turkey	2017 Istanbul nightclub shooting	A gunman opened fire in the Reina Nightclub during New Year celebrations.	Islamic State	Turkey–ISIL conflict
Jan 2	Suicide car bombings	56 (+3)	122	Baghdad, Iraq	January 2017 Baghdad bombings	A series of car bombings in Sadr City and other parts of Baghdad.	Islamic State	Iraqi Civil War
Jan 2	Suicide car bombing	7 (+1)	17	Mogadishu, Somalia	2 January 2017 Mogadishu bombings	Suicide car bombing at a checkpoint near Aden Adde International Airport.	Al-Shabaab	Somali Civil War
Jan 4	Jailbreak, shootout	2 (+5)	1	Kidapawan, Philippines	2017 Kidapawan jail siege	Around 100 gunmen attacked the North Cotabato District Jail. A total of 158 inmates escaped, fourteen of whom were quickly recaptured, while five others were killed.	Bangsamoro Islamic Freedom Fighters (suspected)	Moro conflict
Jan 5	Car bombing, shooting	2 (+2)	10	İzmir, Turkey	2017 İzmir courthouse attack	A car bomb exploded outside a courthouse, triggering a shootout. Two of the attackers were killed, while a third managed to escape.	Kurdistan Freedom Falcons	Kurdish–Turkish conflict
Jan 6	Shooting	5	~42	Fort Lauderdale, United States	Fort Lauderdale airport shooting	Mass shooting at Fort Lauderdale–Hollywood International Airport in Broward County, Florida.	Esteban Santiago-Ruiz	Terrorism in the United States
Jan 7	Car bombing	60+	50	Azaz, Syria	January 2017 Azaz bombing	Car bomb attack at a marketplace in the rebel-held town.	Islamic State (suspected)	Syrian Civil War
Jan 8	Vehicular attack	4 (+1)	17	East Jerusalem, Israel	2017 Jerusalem truck attack	A truck rammed into a group of Israeli soldiers.	Lone wolf	Israeli–Palestinian conflict
Jan 18	Suicide bombings	77 (+1)	115	Gao, Mali	2017 Gao bombing	Five suicide bombers exploded near a NATO army base. There were no reported casualties among the NATO troops. Al-Mourabitoun claimed responsibility.	Al-Mourabitoun	Northern Mali Conflict
Jan 21	Bombing	25	87	Parachinar, Pakistan	2017 Parachinar bombing	A bomb that was placed in a crate exploded at a vegetable market in Kurram Agency tribal area.	Lashkar-e-Jhangvi & Tehrik-i-Taliban Pakistan	War in Northwest Pakistan
Jan 25	Suicide car bombings, shooting	28 (+4)	43+	Mogadishu, Somalia	2017 Dayah Hotel attack	Coordinated attack against the Dayah Hotel.	Al-Shabaab	Somali Civil War
Jan 29	Shooting	6	17	Quebec City, Canada	Quebec City mosque shooting	A gunman opened fire at a mosque.	Alexandre Bissonnette (suspected)	Terrorism in Canada
Feb 13	Suicide bombing	18 (+1)	90+	Lahore, Pakistan	2017 Lahore suicide bombing	A bomb blast ripped through a protest.	Jamaat-ul-Ahrar	Spillover of the War in North-West Pakistan
Feb 15	Suicide bombing	2 (+1)	12+	Peshawar, Pakistan	2017 Hayatabad suicide bombing	A suicide bomber targeted a vehicle carrying local judges and government officials.	Tehrik-i-Taliban Pakistan	Spillover of the War in North-West Pakistan
Feb 16	Suicide bombing	91+ (+1)	300+	Sehwan, Pakistan	Sehwan suicide bombing	Suicide bombing at a shrine.	Islamic State – Khorasan Province	Spillover of the War in North-West Pakistan
Feb 21	Suicide bombings	7 (+3)	21	Charsadda, Pakistan	2017 Charsadda suicide bombing	A sessions court was hit by multiple suicide bombers.	Jamaat-ul-Ahrar	War in North-West Pakistan
Feb 22	Shooting	1	2	Olathe, United States	2017 Olathe shooting	A man shot three people after yelling "get out of my Country." The gunman said he believed the men he shot were Middle Eastern, but the victims were Indian engineers. An Indian man was killed and another was injured. Ian Grillot, an American who tried to save them, was also shot.	Lone wolf	Terrorism in the United States
Mar 7	Bombing	0	10	Madhya Pradesh, India	2017 Bhopal–Ujjain Passenger train bombing	In the first ISIS attack on India, terrorists known to authorities planted low intensity pipe bombs which exploded on a train at Jabri railway station.	Islamic State	Terrorism in India
Mar 8	Suicide bombing, shootings	100+	63+	Kabul, Afghanistan	March 2017 Kabul attack	Gunmen staged a complex assault on a military hospital in the Wazir Akbar Khan area.	Islamic State	War in Afghanistan
Mar 11	Car bombing, suicide bombing	74 (+1)	120+	Damascus, Syria	March 2017 Damascus bombings	Twin bombings in the Old City of Damascus that killed and injured mostly Iraqi Shia pilgrims.	Tahrir al-Sham	Syrian Civil War
Mar 15	Suicide bombings	40 (+2)	30+	Damascus, Syria	March 2017 Damascus bombings	A suicide bomber detonated his vest outside the Palace of Justice. A second suicide blast took place at a restaurant in the Rabweh area.	Islamic State	Syrian Civil War
Mar 17	Suicide bombing	0 (+1)	2	Dhaka, Bangladesh	2017 Dhaka RAB camp suicide bombing	A suicide bomber blew himself up inside a camp of Bangladesh's anti-crime Rapid Action Battalion, injuring two security personnel.	Islamic State	Terrorism in Bangladesh
Mar 20	Stabbing	1	0	New York City, United States	Murder of Timothy Caughman	A white supremacist stabbed an African-American to death. He revealed that he planned larger attacks against black men in Times Square.	James Harris Jackson	Terrorism in the United States
Mar 22	Suicide bombings	8 (+5)	20+	Maiduguri, Nigeria	March 2017 Maiduguri attack	Multiple suicide blasts along a highway.	Boko Haram	Boko Haram insurgency
Mar 22	Vehicle attack, stabbing	5 (+1)	50	London, United Kingdom	2017 Westminster attack	52-year-old Khalid Masood drove into pedestrians on Westminster Bridge before crashing the car into the railings of the Palace of Westminster. The attacker then fled from the vehicle and attempted to gain access through the Palace gates, fatally stabbing a police officer before being shot dead by a plainclothes police officer.	Khalid Masood	Islamic terrorism in the West
Mar 25	Suicide bombing, bombings, shooting	7 (+4)	40+	South Surma Upazila, Bangladesh	2017 South Surma Upazila bombings	Suicide bombing followed by more explosions and gunfire.	Islamic State	Terrorism in Bangladesh
Mar 31	Car bombing	24	70+	Parachinar, Pakistan	March 2017 Parachinar suicide bombing	Blast outside a mosque.	Jamaat-ul-Ahrar	Operation Ghazi
Apr 3	Suicide bombing	15 (+1)	64	St Petersburg, Russia	2017 Saint Petersburg Metro bombing	Suicide bombing on the Saint Petersburg Metro on the day President Vladimir Putin was due to visit the city.	Imam Shamil Battalion	Islamic terrorism in Europe
Apr 5	Suicide bombing	8 (+1)	19	Lahore, Pakistan	April 2017 Lahore suicide bombing	A suicide bomber detonated near a Pakistan Army vehicle taking part in a census. Tehreek-i-Taliban Pakistan claimed responsibility.	Tehreek-i-Taliban Pakistan	War in North-West Pakistan
Apr 5	Shooting, Suicide bombings	35	40	Tikrit, Iraq	2017 Tikrit attacks	Insurgent attack.	Islamic State	Iraqi Civil War
Apr 7	Vehicular attack	5	14	Stockholm, Sweden	2017 Stockholm truck attack	A hijacked truck driven by an Uzbek man steered into a pedestrian shopping street and a department store.	Rakhmat Akilov	Islamic terrorism in Europe
Apr 9	Suicide bombing	30 (+1)	70	Tanta, Egypt	Palm Sunday church bombings	Explosion in a Coptic Church during Palm Sunday service, followed by another attack near a police station.	Islamic State	Insurgency in Egypt
Apr 9	Suicide bombing	43	789	Alexandria, Egypt	Palm Sunday church bombings	A suicide bomber detonated outside Saint Mark's Church in the Manshyia district, followed by another explosion in Chouhada Street.	Islamic State	Insurgency in Egypt
Apr 14	Stabbing	1	2	Jerusalem, Israel	2017 Jerusalem Light Rail stabbing	A Palestinian terrorist stabbed and killed a British student in the Jerusalem Light Rail near Tzahal square.	Palestinian Nationalist	Israeli–Palestinian conflict
Apr 15	Suicide car bombing	126	100+	Aleppo, Syria	2017 Aleppo suicide car bombing	A motor bomb exploded.	Unknown	Syrian Civil War
Apr 20	Shooting	1 (+1)	3	Paris, France	2017 shooting of Paris police officers	One police officer was killed, two others and a woman injured in a shooting in the Champs-Élysées area. One of the two gunmen was killed in the attack.	Islamic State	Islamic terrorism in Europe
Apr 21	Shooting	256 (+10)	160+	Balkh Province, Afghanistan	2017 Camp Shaheen attack	Attack on a military base.	Taliban	War in Afghanistan
Apr 24	Ambush	25 (+3-4)	7	Sukma, India	2017 Sukma attack	Suspected Maoist rebels ambushed a group of Central Reserve Police Force officers who were guarding road workers in Chhattisgarh. At least 25 CRPF soldiers were killed and 7 others were critically injured.	CPI (suspected)	Naxalite–Maoist insurgency
May 8	Bombing	0	4	Peshawar, Pakistan	May 2017 Peshawar bombings	Two bombs exploded while the third one was defused by Bomb Disposal Squad. Three officials of the Counter Terrorism Department (CTD) and a passerby were injured.	Unknown	War in North-West Pakistan
May 9	Car bombings	1	60	Pattani, Thailand	2017 Pattani bombing	Two bombs went off at Big C Supercenter in Muang district. A canvas vendor was killed before his truck was stolen to transport the bombs.	Barisan Revolusi Nasional (suspected)	South Thailand insurgency
May 12	Suicide bombing	28 (+1)	37	Mastung, Pakistan	2017 Mastung bombing		Islamic State	War in North-West Pakistan
May 20	Shooting	141+	100+	Wadi al Shatii District, Libya	Brak El-Shati airbase raid		Misrata Militants (suspected)	Second Libyan Civil War
May 22	Suicide bombing	22 (+1)	800+	Manchester, United Kingdom	Manchester Arena bombing	A suicide bomber blew himself up at an Ariana Grande concert.	Salman Abedi	Islamic terrorism in Europe
May 24	Suicide bombings	3 (+2)	10	Jakarta, Indonesia	2017 Jakarta bombings	Three police officers were killed and ten others, five police officers and five civilians, injured when two suicide bombers blew themselves up at a bus stop.	Jamaah Ansharut Tauhid	Terrorism in Indonesia
May 26	Shootings	28	25+	Minya, Egypt	2017 Minya attack	Gunmen opened fire on a bus carrying Coptic Christians.	Islamic State (suspected)	Insurgency in Egypt
May 30	Car bombing	30+	40	Baghdad, Iraq	Al-Faqma ice cream parlor bombing	A car bomb detonated outside an ice cream shop.	Islamic State	Iraqi Civil War
May 31	Car bombing	150+	413+	Kabul, Afghanistan	May 2017 Kabul attack	Car bombing in the diplomatic quarter.	Haqqani network	War in Afghanistan
Jun 3	Vehicular attack, Stabbing	8 (+3)	48	London, United Kingdom	2017 London Bridge attack	A van ran over multiple pedestrians on London Bridge. The men then drove to Borough Market, where they stabbed multiple people before being shot by police.	Islamic State	Islamic terrorism in Europe
Jun 5	Hostage taking, Shooting	1 (+1)	3	Brighton, Australia	2017 Brighton siege	Yacqub Khayre, killed a man and took a woman hostage before he was shot dead by police following a siege. During the course of the siege three police officers were wounded.	Islamic State	Terrorism in Australia
Jun 6	Bombing	10	16	Herat, Afghanistan	2017 Herat bombing	Bomb blast outside the Jama Masjid of Herat.	Taliban (suspected)	War in Afghanistan
Jun 6	Melee attack	0	1 (+1)	Paris, France	2017 Notre Dame attack	A police officer who was outside Notre-Dame Cathedral was injured after he was attacked by a man with a hammer, who was then shot by police.	Lone wolf	Islamic terrorism in Europe
Jun 7	Shooting, suicide Bombings	18 (+5)	52	Tehran, Iran	2017 Tehran attacks	The Iranian parliament and the Mausoleum of Ruhollah Khomeini were attacked by seven armed men with pistols and Kalashnikov rifles.	Islamic State	Assassination and terrorism in Iran
Jun 14	Shooting	0 (+1)	6	Alexandria, United States	Congressional baseball shooting	A gunman targeting Republican lawmakers opened fire at a baseball field. A top Republican, Steve Scalise, was critically injured.	Lone wolf	Terrorism in the United States
Jun 16	Stabbing, shooting	1 (+3)	4	Jerusalem, Israel	June 2017 Jerusalem attack	A Border Police guard in a coordinated stabbing and shooting attack in two areas in Jerusalem's Old City.	Islamic State (claimed); PFLP; Hamas	Terrorism in Israel
Jun 17	Bombing	3	9	Bogotá, Colombia	Centro Andino bombing	A bomb exploded in a women's bathroom at the upscale Andino mall.	MRP (suspected)	Terrorism in Colombia
Jun 19	Vehicular attack	1	10	London, United Kingdom	2017 Finsbury Park attack	A vehicle rammed into people walking out of a mosque in the Finsbury Park neighborhood.	Lone wolf (suspected)	Terrorism in the United Kingdom
Jun 20	Attempted suicide bombing, Shooting, Melee attack	0 (+1)	0	Brussels, Belgium	June 2017 Brussels attack	A terrorist ran into Brussels Central Station, where he detonated a small bomb which caused no injuries. Still carrying a suicide vest, he ran to another part of the station. There he was shot and killed by soldiers who were guarding the station.	Islamist	Islamic terrorism in Europe
Jun 21	Stabbing	0	1	Flint, United States	2017 Bishop International Airport incident	A man shouting "Allah Akbar", stormed Bishop International Airport. A police officer was seriously injured when he was stabbed in the neck.	Islamist	Terrorism in the United States
Jun 21	Bombing	34+	60+	Lashkargah, Afghanistan	June 2017 Kabul bank attack	Bomb attack on a branch of the Kabul Bank in the province of Helmand.	Taliban	War in Afghanistan
Jun 23	Suicide bombings	78 (+2)	200+	Parachinar, Pakistan	June 2017 Pakistan bombings	Two bomb blasts took place in a market.	Jamaat-ul-Ahrar	War in North-West Pakistan
Jun 23	Car bombing	13 (+1)	20	Quetta, Pakistan	June 2017 Pakistan bombings	Car bomb attack near the provincial police chief's office.	Jamaat-ul-Ahrar	War in North-West Pakistan
Jun 23	Shootings	4	1	Karachi, Pakistan	June 2017 Pakistan bombings	Men on motorcycles shot policemen in an industrial area.	Islamist (suspected)	War in North-West Pakistan
Jul 10	Shooting	7	19	Anantnag district, India	2017 Amarnath Yatra attack	Militants first attacked a police bunker and then a police party. A bus carrying pilgrims to Amarnath Temple was caught in the crossfire between militants and policemen.	Lashkar-e-Taiba	Insurgency in Jammu and Kashmir
Jul 14	Shooting	2 (+3)	1	Jerusalem, Israel	2017 Temple Mount shooting	Three Arab-Israelis opened fire on Israeli police officers at the Temple Mount near the Lions' Gate and fled to mosques of the Mount. Three officers were shot and injured, two of them critically. The three attackers, who were armed with rifles and a handgun, were all shot dead by police.	Islamic Jihad Movement in Palestine (suspected)	Israeli–Palestinian conflict
Jul 14	Stabbing	3	3	Hurghada, Egypt	2017 Hurghada attack	Two German tourists and a Czech citizen were killed and when a knifeman attacked a holiday resort.	Islamic State	Insurgency in Egypt
Jul 21	Stabbing	3	1 (+1)	Halamish, West Bank	2017 Halamish stabbing attack	Three Israelis were killed and one severely wounded in a stabbing attack. The assailant, identified as Palestinian, was shot by a neighbour.	Islamist	Israeli–Palestinian conflict
Jul 23	Melee attack	1 (+1)	1	Amman, Jordan	2017 Amman incident	A Jordanian worker at the Israeli embassy stabbed a guard who shot the perpetrator dead. A bystander was also hit by the gunfire and later succumbed to his injuries	Islamist	Temple Mount crisis
Jul 24	Stabbing	0	1	Petah Tikva, Israel	July 2017 Petah Tikva attack	A 32-year old Israeli Arab civilian was stabbed in the neck by a Palestinian man from Qalqilya. The attacker was arrested and reportedly said that he "did it for Al-Aqsa".	Islamic Jihad Movement in Palestine (suspected)	Temple Mount crisis
Jul 24	Suicide bombing	26 (+1)	54	Lahore, Pakistan	July 2017 Lahore suicide bombing		Tehrik-i-Taliban Pakistan	War in North-West Pakistan
Jul 28	Stabbing	1	6	Hamburg, Germany	2017 Hamburg attack	A man shouting "Allahu Akbar" stabbed civilians in a supermarket.	Islamist	Islamic terrorism in Europe
Jul 30	Shooting and bombing	12-39+ (+8)	7	Lower Shebelle, Somalia	Golweyn ambush	A convoy of Ugandan AMISOM peacekeepers and Somali soldiers was ambushed by Al-Shabaab.	Al-Shabaab	War in Somalia
Aug 1	Suicide bombing, shooting	33 (+2)	66	Herat, Afghanistan	2017 Herat mosque attack	Two suicide bombers attacked a Shia mosque. One of the bombers shot at worshipers with a rifle before detonating himself.	Islamic State	War in Afghanistan
Aug 2	Stabbing	0	1	Yavneh, Israel	2017 Yavne attack	A 19-year-old Palestinian man from Yatta, stabbed a 40-year-old Israeli civilian in a supermarket. The victim suffered serious injuries. The attacker was arrested by police.	Ismail Abu Aram	Israeli–Palestinian conflict
Aug 9	Vehicular attack	0	6(+1)	Levallois-Perret, France	2017 Levallois-Perret attack	A car rammed into a group of soldiers in the northwestern suburbs of Paris. Six soldiers patrolling the area as part of Opération Sentinelle were injured, three of them seriously. The driver fled the scene and, several hours later, was shot and arrested by an elite police unit on a highway near Marquise, Pas-de-Calais after attempting to ram a roadblock.	Islamist	Islamic terrorism in Europe
Aug 11	Bombing	3	26	Bajaur Agency, Pakistan	2017 Bajour bombing	Roadside bomb in a tribal district near the Afghan border.	Tehrik-i-Taliban Pakistan (suspected)	War in North-West Pakistan
Aug 12	Vehicular attack	1	19	Charlottesville, Virginia, United States	Charlottesville car attack	A car driven by a neo-Nazi plowed into a group of people marching peacefully during protests.	James Alex Fields	Unite the Right Rally
Aug 12	Suicide bombing	15 (+1)	32	Quetta, Pakistan	August 2017 Quetta suicide bombing		Islamic State	War in North-West Pakistan
Aug 14	Shootings	19 (+3)	22	Ouagadougou, Burkina Faso	2017 Ouagadougou attack	Suspected jihadists opened fire on a Turkish restaurant and Hotel. Three attackers were also killed.	Al-Qaeda in the Islamic Maghreb (suspected)	Insurgency in the Maghreb
Aug 14	Bombing	8	4	Harnai District, Pakistan	2017 Harnai bombing	Soldiers were killed in a roadside bomb blast in Baluchistan.	Balochistan Liberation Army (suspected)	Insurgency in Balochistan
Aug 17–22	Vehicular attacks, Stabbings, Bombings, Attempted massive truck bombing	16 (+8)	152	Barcelona, Alcanar, Cambrils and Subirats, Catalonia, Spain	2017 Barcelona attacks	15 civilians were killed and more than 130 others were injured when a van ran over pedestrians in La Rambla of Barcelona. Two of the attackers were arrested and another, who fled, stabbing a civilian to death and stealing his car in Barcelona. He then ran the car into three Catalan police officers in Avinguda Diagonal injuring one. A woman was killed and six others injured in Cambrils attack when a car tried to run into pedestrians and later attackers stabbed people with knives, axes and machetes. Sixteen people were injured in Alcanar bombings, that police believe were intended for a Barcelona attack. In the two bombings, two terrorists were also killed. The van driver was shot dead in Subirats, a village in the south of Barcelona by Mossos d'Esquadra, the Catalan police.	Islamic State	Islamic terrorism in Europe
Aug 18	Stabbing	2	8	Turku, Finland	2017 Turku attack		Islamists	Islamic terrorism in Europe
Aug 25	Hostage taking, executions	99+	Unknown	Maungdaw District, Myanmar	Kha Maung Seik massacre	Hindu villages in the cluster of Kha Maung Seik in Rakhine State were attacked by armed insurgents.	Arakan Rohingya Salvation Army	Northern Rakhine State clashes
Aug 25	Stabbing	0 (+1)	2	Brussels, Belgium	August 2017 Brussels attack	Two soldiers were lightly wounded after a machete-wielding man attacked them. The perpetrator was shot dead at the scene.	Islamic State	Islamic terrorism in Europe
Sep 14	Suicide car bombing, Shooting	84 (+4)	93	Nasiriyah, Iraq	2017 Nasiriyah attacks	The first attack struck close to a restaurant while shortly afterwards a car bomb targeted a security checkpoint in the same area.	Islamic State	Iraqi Civil War
Sep 15	Bombing	0	30	London, United Kingdom	Parsons Green train bombing	A crude homemade bomb partially exploded on a District line tube train at Parsons Green tube station.	Islamic State	Islamic terrorism in Europe
Sep 26	Shooting	3 (+1)	1	Har Adar, West Bank	2017 Har Adar shooting	A Palestinian gunman killed three Israeli soldiers and critically injured a fourth. The gunman was shot and killed by the other soldiers.	Palestinian nationalist (suspected)	Israeli–Palestinian conflict
Sep 30	Stabbing, vehicular attack	0	5	Edmonton, Canada	2017 Edmonton attack	A police officer was stabbed near Commonwealth Stadium and four pedestrians were injured by a fleeing rental van.	Abdulahi Sharif	Terrorism in Canada
Oct 1	Knife attack	2 (+1)	0	Marseille, France	2017 Marseille stabbing	A man with a knife killed two women at Saint Charles station before he was shot dead by police. The perpetrator was alleged to have yelled "Allahu Akbar" during the attack.	Ahmed Hanachi	Islamic terrorism in Europe
Oct 4	Ambush	9 (+21)	10	Tillabéri Region, Niger	Tongo Tongo ambush	Four U.S. Army personnel and five Nigerien soldiers were killed after being ambushed while assisting local forces.	Islamic State (suspected)	Insurgency in the Maghreb
Oct 14	Truck bombing	587	316	Mogadishu, Somalia	14 October 2017 Mogadishu bombings	Truck bombing in a busy area near a hotel.	Al-Shabaab	War in Somalia
Oct 28	Car bombings, Shootings	25	30	Mogadishu, Somalia	28 October 2017 Mogadishu attacks	Explosion occurred near the national theater.	Al-Shabaab	War in Somalia
Oct 31	Vehicular assault	8	11 (+1)	New York City, United States	2017 New York City truck attack	A pickup truck rammed into pedestrians near the World Trade center. An ISIS flag and a note that read "Islamic State lives forever" in Arabic were found near the truck. The attacker was self-radicalized.	Islamic State	Terrorism in the United States
Nov 21	Suicide bombing	50	Dozens	Mubi, Nigeria	2017 Mubi bombing	Attack in a mosque in Adamawa State.	Boko Haram	Boko Haram insurgency
Nov 24	Bombing, shootings	309+	128+	Bir al-Abed, Egypt	2017 Sinai attack	Attackers put explosives around the mosque and set fire to them when worshippers left after Friday prayers. Then they shot at the survivors.	Islamic State (suspected)	Sinai insurgency
Nov 24	Suicide bombing	2 (+1)	8	Peshawar, Pakistan	2017 Peshawar police vehicle attack	A motorcycle suicide bomber targeted a police vehicle of AIG Asharf Noor while he was travelling to work. Noor and his guard were killed and eight other police in the AIG's squad were injured.	Lashkar-e-Islam (suspected)	Insurgency in Khyber Pakhtunkhwa
Dec 1	Shooting	9 (+3)	37	Peshawar, Pakistan	2017 Peshawar Agriculture Directorate attack	3–4 gunmen who were burqa-clad, arrived at the Agriculture Training Institute in a rickshaw. Three attackers were also killed.	Tehrik-i-Taliban Pakistan	War in North-West Pakistan
Dec 8	Shooting	19	53	North Kivu, Democratic Republic of Congo	2017 Semuliki attack	At least 14 UN peacekeepers were killed and 53 wounded in an attack in the east of the country. Five Congolese soldiers were also killed. The attack was described as the worst on UN peacekeepers in recent history.	Allied Democratic Forces	Allied Democratic Forces insurgency
Dec 11	Attempted suicide bombing (pipe bomb partially detonated)	0	3 (+1)	New York City, United States	2017 New York City Subway bombing	A 27-year-old Bangladeshi national who lived in Brooklyn set off a home-made pipe bomb at the port authority in Manhattan. Later he told police his motive was recent Israeli actions in Gaza and that was inspired by the Islamic State.	Akayed Ullah	Terrorism in the United States
Dec 17	Suicide bombing, shooting	9 (+2)	57	Quetta, Pakistan	2017 Quetta church attack	Suicide bombers attacked Bethel Memorial Methodist Church on Zarghoon Road.	Islamic State	War in North-West Pakistan
Dec 28	Suicide bombing, Bombings	50 (+1)	80	Kabul, Afghanistan	28 December 2017 Kabul suicide bombing	A suicide bomber stormed a Shi‘ite cultural center and news agency. Two other bombs were detonated in the zone.	Islamic State	War in Afghanistan
