= List of bombings during the War in Iraq (2013–2017) =

This article lists significant bombings during the Iraqi Civil War (2013–2017).

== Bombings ==
This article lists all major bombings between 30 December 2013 and 9 December 2017. For bombings that occurred prior this date see List of bombings during the Iraq War or List of bombings during the Iraqi insurgency (2011–2013)

Date	City	Attack	Deaths	Perpetrator	Source
2 January 2014	(Iraq) Baghdad		19	Islamic State	
1 January 2017	(Iraq) Najaf		6	Islamic State	
2 January 2017	(Iraq) Baghdad		24	Islamic State	
8 January 2017	(Iraq) Baghdad		20	Islamic State	
30 May 2017	(Iraq) Baghdad	Al-Faqma ice cream parlor bombing	26	Islamic State	
14 September 2017	(Iraq) Nasiriyah	2017 Nasiriyah attacks	84	Islamic State	
