= Zambar, Iraq =

Zambar
- Village
- Location in Iraq
- Coordinates: 36°19′18″N 42°32′36″E
- Country: Iraq
- Governorate: Nineveh Governorate
- District: Tel Afar District
- Time zone: UTC+3 (Arabia Standard Time)

Zambar (Arabic: زمبر) is a small desert village in Tel Afar District of Nineveh Governorate of northern Iraq. It is located about 12 kilometres (7.5 mi) southeast of Tel Afar and about 50 kilometres (31 mi) directly west of Mosul. It is located about halfway between Tel Afar and the larger settlement of Shaikh Ibrahim, further to the southeast.

== History ==
The Germans discovered oil at Zanbar and Qusair in the 1930s and began drilling; a team of German and Italian workers were deployed to tap the resources.

== Geography ==
Zambar is located in northern Iraq, about 12 kilometres (7.5 mi) southeast of Tel Afar. There is a mountain, Jabal Zambar, of about 525 metres (1,722 ft) above sea level, about 2 kilometres (1.2 mi) to the northeast. A stream runs intermittently down from the mountain.
