= Shaikh Ibrahim, Iraq =

Shaikh Ibrahim
- Town
- Location in Iraq
- Coordinates: 36°17′10″N 42°39′2″E
- Country: Iraq
- Governorate: Nineveh Governorate
- District: Tel Afar District
- Time zone: UTC+3 (Arabia Standard Time)

Shaikh Ibrahim (Turkish: Şıh İbrahim) is a Turkmen village in Tel Afar District, Nineveh Governorate, Iraq. It is located about 25 kilometres (16 mi) southeast of Tel Afar and 10 kilometres (6.2 mi) southeast of Zambar, and roughly 45 kilometres (28 mi) directly west of Mosul.

There is a mountain in the area of the same name to the northeast of the town, Jebel Shaikh Ibrahim.
