= Jebel Sasan =

Large hill in Iraq

- Location within Iraq

Highest point
- Elevation: 543 metres (1,781 ft)
- Coordinates: 36°26′04″N 42°25′04″E

Geography
- Location: Tel Afar District of Nineveh Province of northern Iraq

Jebel Sasan (Arabic: جبل ساسان,چياى ساسان) is a large hill in the Tel Afar District of Nineveh Province of northern Iraq. The name may also be rendered as Jabal Sasan.

== Geology ==
Anticlinal structures in Nineveh. Jebel Sasan (4) extends northwest from the town of Tal Afar

Jebel Sasan is in a transitional folded zone between an alpinotype area to the northeast and the Arabian Shield to the southwest. Tectonic movements in the Late Cretaceous caused formation of a rapidly subsiding trough aligned east-west passing below Jabal Sinjar and Jabal Sasan into the Butmah area. Open-sea globigerina sedimentation filled the trough at about the same rate as subsidence throughout the Late Cretaceous. The crystalline basement in the Jebel Sasan area is at a depth of about 4,000 to 4,500 metres (13,100 to 14,800 ft).

== Geography ==
The region includes the anticlines of Jebel Sinjar, Jebel Sinu, Jebel Sasan, Jebel Zambar, Jebel Sheik Ibrahim and Jebel Adaiya. The Jebels Zambar and Ibrahim are sometimes treated as one structure. The Sanjar-Zambar mountain range includes the Teymurlenk (Tamerlane) hills, which contain the Turkmen city of Tal Afar. The Jebel Sasan structure is about 10 by 7 kilometres (6.2 by 4.3 mi) in extent. A shallow saddle to the southeast divides it from the similar Jebel Zambar structure.

== Agriculture ==
The first farming villages in the Mespotamian lowlands are those of the Hassuna pottery makers, dating to around 6000 BC. These villages are most concentrated in the northern Jazira plains to the north and south of Jebels Sinjar and Ishkaft, to the west and north of Jebel Sasan. Average annual rainfall is about 300 to 400 millimetres (12 to 16 in), enough to support dry farming.

Jebel Sasan is part of an arc of hills that includes Jebel Abd el-Aziz and Jebel Sinjar to the west, and Jebel Ishkaft, Jebel Ibrahim and Jebel Maqlub to the east. As moist air travels up the valleys of the Tigris and Euphrates it deposits moisture on the southern slopes of these hills, creating a more fertile zone to the south of the dry farming area. To the south of Tel Afar in the gap between Jebel Sasan and Jebel Ibrahim there is lower rainfall than to the north, but more groundwater, with many springs along the southern edge of the hills behind Tel Afar. In ancient times this zone contained significant kingdoms. Of these Karana may lie below Tel Afar.

== Sources ==
- Acta Universitatis Carolinae: Geologica. Universita Karlova. 1978.
- Al-Sawaf, Fakhri D.S. (1977). "HYDROGEOLOGY OF SOUTH SINJAR PLAIN NORTHWEST IRAQ" (PDF). University College London.
- Heimpel, Wolfgang (2003). Letters to the King of Mari: A New Translation, with Historical Introduction, Notes, and Commentary. Eisenbrauns. ISBN 978-1-57506-080-4.
- Journal of the Geological Society of Iraq. The Society. 1976.
- Maisels, Charles Keith (2005-10-24). The Near East: Archaeology in the 'Cradle of Civilization'. Routledge. ISBN 978-1-134-66469-6.
- Orhan Ketene (2007). "Turkmen and Turkmeneli" (PDF). Archived from the original (PDF) on 2014-07-26.
