= Western Anbar offensive =

Western Anbar offensive may refer to:

- Western Anbar offensive (2017)
- 2017 Western Iraq campaign
