= 2017 Nasiriyah attacks =

2017 Iraqi terrorist attack

Coordinates: 31°3′N 46°16′E

- Part of the War in Iraq (2013–2017)
- Nasiriyah (Iraq)
- Location: Nasiriyah, Iraq
- Date: 14 September 2017
- Target: Iraqi Shias, Iranian pilgrims
- Attack type: Shooting, Car bombing, suicide bombings
- Weapons: Explosive belts, Automatic weapons, Grenades
- Deaths: 84 (+4 attackers)
- Injuries: 93
- Perpetrator: Islamic State

On 14 September 2017, several members of IS staged multiple attacks on the outskirts of Nasiriyah in the southern Dhi Qar Governorate, Iraq, killing at least 84 people and injuring 93 others.

== Background ==
The attacks came as the Islamic State group faced a series of crushing defeats both in Iraq and neighbouring Syria, including the loss of Mosul after a nine-month battle in early July, followed by a successful Iraqi government offensive against the nearby town of Tal Afar in late August. U.S. officials said the terrorist organization had been severely degraded after losing almost 90 percent of the territory it captured during the 2014 blitz across Iraq, including populated places that held factories for creating car bombs and improvised explosive devices. This meant that members would increasingly rely on a combination of suicide bombers, automatic weapons and other methods as their primary means of targeting civilian and government infrastructure, as evidenced by a series of attacks in Tikrit, as well as a bombing at an ice cream parlor in Baghdad.

Analysts and journalists alike warned that despite the recent setbacks, the group remained capable of launching attacks across Iraq, especially at soft targets such as restaurants and entertainment venues.

== Attacks ==
In the first attack, which took place around lunchtime, several gunmen and at least one suicide bomber wearing military uniforms arrived in three cars and entered the Fadak restaurant on Freeway 1 to Baghdad, a popular stop for pilgrims travelling north to Najaf and Karbala. The assailants then began shooting with automatic weapons and throwing grenades, killing or injuring at least 50 people. Shortly afterwards, two suicide bombers, including one driving an explosives-rigged car, blew themselves up at a nearby police checkpoint, causing further casualties.The twin attacks killed 84 people and injured 93 others, many of them seriously.

According to provincial governor Yahya al-Nassiri, the majority of casualties were expected to be Iranian and Iraqi Shia pilgrims, who were inside the restaurant at the time of the first attack.

The pro-Islamic State Amaq News Agency claimed the group was responsible for the twin attacks. At least one report said the attackers were disguised as members of the Popular Mobilization Forces—a mainly Shia group that has fought alongside Iraqi forces against IS.

The twin attacks represented one of the highest single-day tolls of any similar incident in southern Iraq since the U.S. invasion in 2003, and were the deadliest since the government recapture of Mosul in July 2017. The Islamic State group had previously targeted Iraqi and Iranian pilgrims during the 2016 Arba'een Pilgrimage, killing more than 120 people in multiple truck bombings in the central town of Hillah.

== See also ==
- 2003 Nasiriyah bombing, a truck bomb attack that targeted the Italian military headquarters in the city.
