= Tal Afar Citadel =

Fortified city center in Iraq

- Telafer Kalesi
- Tal Afar, Iraq
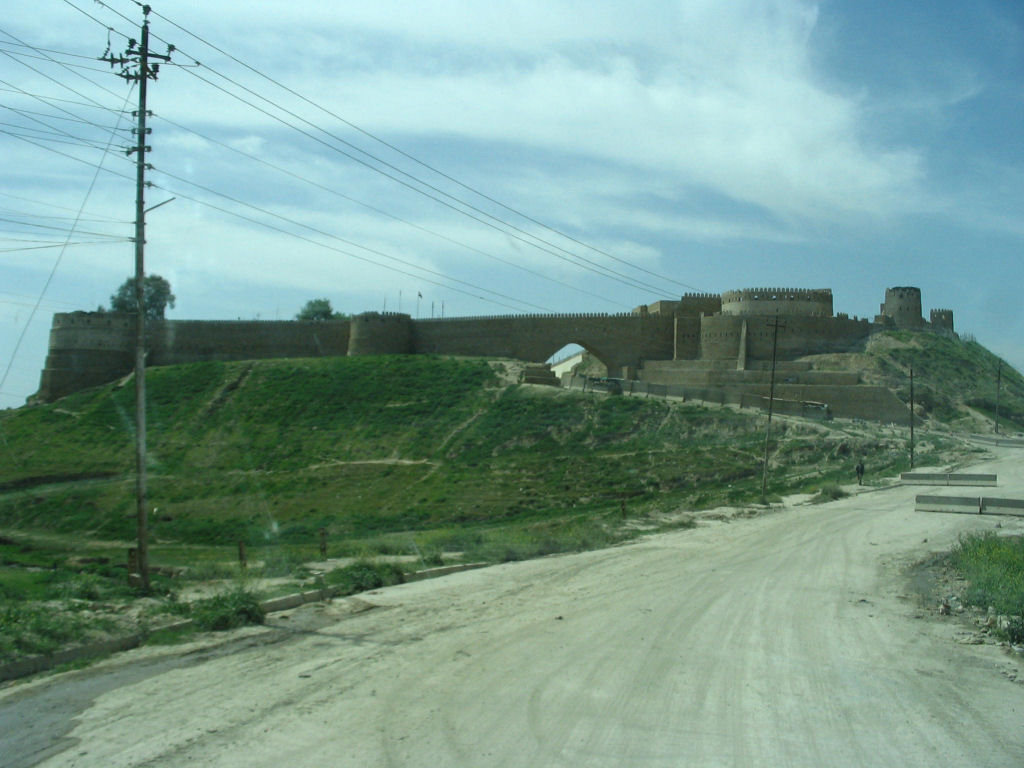
- The Tal Afar Citadel in 2007

Site information
- Type: Citadel
- Controlled by: Iraq
- Open to the public: No
- Condition: Ruins

Location
- Coordinates: 36°22′32″N 42°27′16.7″E

Site history
- Built: 16th century
- Built by: Ottoman Empire
- Fate: Demolished by ISIL in 2015
- Battles/wars: Battle of Tal Afar (2005); Battle of Tal Afar (2017)

The Tal Afar Citadel (Turkish: Telafer Kalesi) is a citadel located in Tal Afar, a city in Nineveh Governorate in northwest Iraq. The citadel was built by the Ottoman Empire, although it contains remains dating back to the Assyrian period.

Following the 2003 invasion of Iraq, the citadel housed the mayoral, municipal and police headquarters of Tal Afar. It was used as a base by American forces in the Battle of Tal Afar in 2005. Tal Afar fell to the Islamic State of Iraq and the Levant in June 2014, and the militants used the citadel as a prison for women and girls who were to be forcibly married to ISIL members.

In December 2014, ISIL blew up the city's northern and western walls, causing extensive damage. The militants also excavated some of the ruins within the citadel, probably to look for antiquities which they could sell. UNESCO Director-General Irina Bokova strongly condemned the destruction of the citadel. The citadel was recaptured by Iraqi forces during the battle to recapture Tal Afar in 2017.

Zarb castle
- Location: Ghammas, Iraq

== See also ==
- list of castles in Iraq
