= Jabal Zambar =

Mountain in Nineveh Province, Iraq

- Location within Iraq

Highest point
- Elevation: 543 metres (1,781 ft)
- Coordinates: 36°21′36″N 42°32′17″E

Naming
- Native name: جبل زمبر (Arabic)

Geography
- Location: Tel Afar District of Nineveh Province of northern Iraq

Jabal Zambar (Arabic: جبل زمبر) is a large hill in the Tel Afar District of Nineveh Province of northern Iraq. The name may also be rendered as Jabal or Jebel Sinbar, Zinbar or Zinbār, or Zambar Mountain.

== Geography ==
Anticlinal structures in Nineveh. Jebel Zambar (7) extends south from the town of Tal Afar

Jebel Zambar is in a transitional folded zone between the alpinotype area to the northeast and the Arabian Shield to the southwest. This area holds the major anticlinal structures between the Tigris and the Al-Tharthar basin. The zone includes Jebel Sinjar, Jebel Sinu, Jebel Sasan, Jebel Zambar, Jebel Sheik Ibrahim and Jebel Adaiya. The Jebels Zambar and Ibrahim are sometimes treated as one structure.

The Sanjar-Zambar mountain range includes the Teymurlenk (Tamerlane) hills, which contain the Turkmen city of Tal Afar. Jabal Zambar is the highest point in the hilly area to the east of Tal Afar. It is about 543 metres (1,781 ft) above sea level. A shallow saddle to the northwest of Jebel Zambar divides it from the similar Jebel Sasan structure, which is about 10 by 7 kilometres (6.2 by 4.3 mi) in extent.

== History ==
In the late 1930s Germans drilled wells on the Zambar and Qusair structures west of Mosul towards Sinjar. A feasibility study of the Mosul Dam project was to include a study of irrigating the northern catchment area of the Tharthar depression. This would include construction of a water supply tunnel under Jabal Zambar. On 7 January 2006, twelve U.S., military personnel died when their UH-60 Blackhawk helicopter crashed on Zambar Mountain.
