= 2017 İzmir courthouse attack =

Terrorist incident in Turkey

2017 İzmir Courthouse Attack
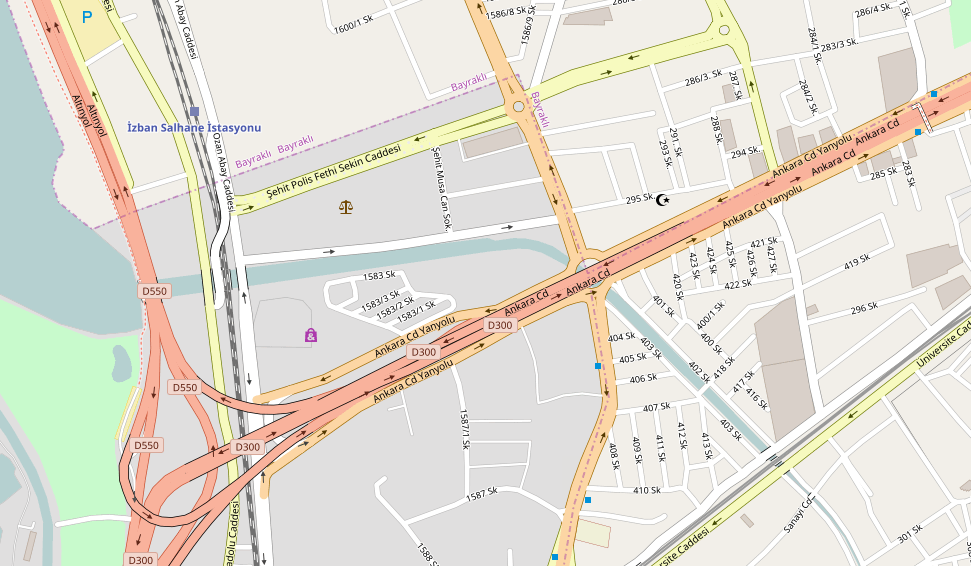
- Location of the courthouse, where the attack took place.
- Location: 38°26′56″N 27°10′33″E; Bayraklı, İzmir, Turkey
- Date: 5 January 2017; 9 years ago 16:10 (UTC+3)
- Target: Civilians and personnel at the courthouse
- Attack type: Terrorism, Car bombing, mass shooting
- Weapons: AK-47, RPG-7, Hand Grenade
- Deaths: 4 (1 civilian, 1 police officer, 2 attackers)
- Injuries: 7
- Perpetrator: Kurdistan Freedom Hawks
- Assailants: Mustafa Çoban †; Enes Yıldırım †

On 5 January 2017 16:10 local time, a car bomb was detonated outside a courthouse in Bayraklı, İzmir, Aegean Province of Turkey and triggered a deadly shootout killing both of the assailants.

== Attack ==
It is assumed that attackers tried to enter the courthouse auto park with their car full of explosives. Security forces identified the vehicle as a threat as it approached a checkpoint, causing the attackers to leave their car, detonate their explosives and open fire with AK-47 rifles.

Gunfire broke out between police and the men suspected to have orchestrated the attack. Two militants were shot dead at the scene, while a third was thought to have escaped.

Police officer Fethi Sekin, who identified the vehicle shouting "Terrorists!" and stopped the attack by triggering the gunfight, was killed after shooting at least one of the suspects. Also, an employee of the İzmir courthouse was killed during the gunfire. 7 people were injured, including 4 police officers and 3 civilians.

== Aftermath ==
Two AK-47 rifles, a rocket launcher and eight hand grenades were seized after the incident from the scene.

18 suspects linked to attack were arrested according to Turkish Ministry of Justice.

Erol Ayyildiz, governor of İzmir, said that police officer Fethi Sekin prevented an even bigger attack by noticing the bomb-laden car on time, intervening and stopping the assailants from reaching the courthouse itself.

Turkish prime minister Binali Yıldırım stated that ‘Our heroic police officer martyred in this attack, prevented a much bigger disaster happening, sacrificing his own life without a thought for it.’

Hundreds of people gathered for a memorial service in Izmir to hail Sekin as a national hero, with photos of his coffin draped in the Turkish flag flooding social media. People were seen waiting outside in the cold, wet weather, with umbrellas and rain jackets, to pay their respects.

ISIS claimed responsibility for the attack the same day, but on 11 January, the Kurdistan Freedom Hawks (TAK) claimed responsibility for the attack and identified the attackers.

== Perpetrators ==
The two suspects shot dead at the scene, were identified as Mustafa Çoban and Enes Yıldırım, members of the militant organization TAK. The TAK threatened more attacks in revenge for Turkeys fight against the Kurds in South East Anatolia.

Images posted online have also emerged showing the bodies of two suspects lying on the ground after being shot, with their weapons nearby.

The U.S. government, United Kingdom and the European Union has designated the Kurdistan Freedom Hawks as a terrorist organization, while Turkey regards the group as part of the terrorist organization Kurdistan Workers' Party, therefore doesn't list it separately.

== See also ==
- List of terrorist incidents in January 2017
