= Battle of Tal Afar (2017) =

Part of the War in Iraq

- Part of the war in Iraq (2013–2017) and the US-led intervention in Iraq (2014–2021)
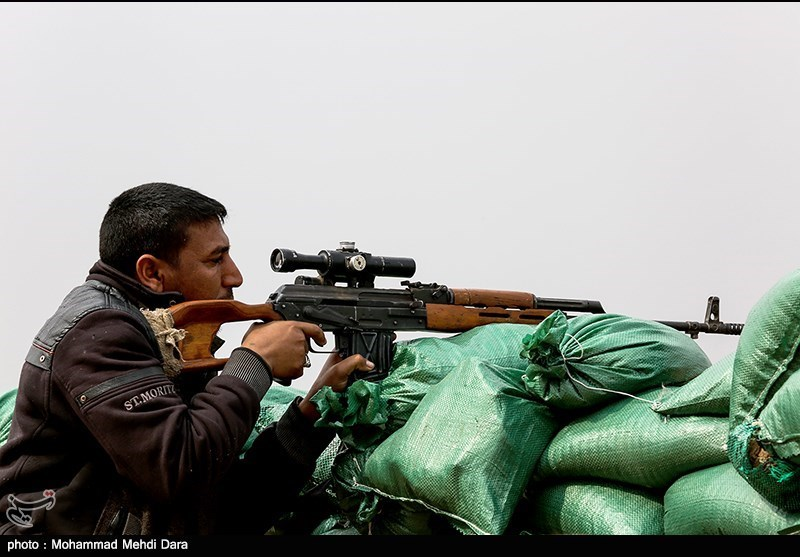
- A Popular Mobilization Forces sniper with the PSL rifle during the battle
Date	20 August – 2 September 2017 (1 week and 6 days)
Location	Tal Afar, Northern Nineveh Governorate, Iraq
Result	Iraqi victory: Iraqi forces capture Tal Afar city on 28 August; Iraqi forces capture Mahalabiyah and Ayadhiyah by 2 September

Belligerents
Iraq; Supported by: CJTF–OIR; Kurdistan Region	Islamic State

Commanders and leaders
(Iraq) Lt. Gen. Abdel Emir Yarallah	(Islamic State) Abu Bakr al-Baghdadi (Leader of IS) (Islamic State) Abu Ibrahim al-Hashimi al-Qurashi (Islamic State) Abu Qatada al-Afri †

Units involved
Iraqi Security Forces; Iraq Armed Forces; Iraqi Ground Forces; 7th Division; 26th Brigade; 9th Armored Division; 15th Infantry Division; 16th Division; Iraqi Special Operations Forces (ISOF); 1st Division; 3rd Division; Iraqi Air Force; Popular Mobilization Forces; 91st Brigade; Iraqi Police (IP)	Military of the Islamic State

Strength
(Iraq) 60,000+ fighters: 40,000+ Iraqi soldiers; 20,000 paramilitaries	1,500–2,000 militants (per Iraq and US)

Casualties and losses
115 killed, 679 wounded 1,100 killed and wounded (ISIL claim)	2,000+ killed (Iraqi claim); 212 captured 1,000–1,200 killed (U.S. claim)
- Iraqi forces capture Mahalabiyah and Ayadhiyah by 2 September

The Battle of Tal Afar was an offensive announced on 20 August 2017 by Iraqi Prime Minister Haider al-Abadi in order to liberate the Tal Afar region from the Islamic State (IS). Victory in the battle was declared by the Prime Minister al-Abadi following the capture of the last IS-held area in Tal Afar district.

The offensive was concurrent with the Raqqa campaign conducted by the Syrian Democratic Forces (SDF) against IS's capital city and stronghold in Syria, as well as the Central Syria Campaign, by the Syrian Arab Army to capture IS territory towards Deir ez-Zor.

== Background ==
After the United States-led invasion of Iraq, Tal Afar experienced cycles of sectarian violence between Sunnis and Shi'ites and has produced some of IS's most senior leaders. The city was captured by the militants during the early period of their June 2014 offensive. It was strategically significant due to its location along a supply route between Mosul and Syria.

Iraqi forces in August attacked Tal Afar, one of the last Iraqi cities under control of ISIS. The operation was launched a month after Mosul was retaken from the group. The city has remained cut off from other territories of the group since June 2017. Warplanes had bombarded the group's positions in the city for several days in preparation for ground operations.

== The battle ==
=== Advance to Tal Afar ===
On 20 August 2017, Prime Minister Haider al-Abadi announced the beginning of the Tal Afar offensive, telling the militants "You either surrender, or die" in a televised speech. Hours beforehand, leaflets were dropped on the city telling the residents to prepare for battle. Later, the PMU advanced three kilometers and retook four hills, progressing toward Tal Afar from the south. Iraqi airstrikes also destroyed four booby-trapped vehicles driven by suicide bombers. The US-led coalition carried out dozens of airstrikes on the outskirts of the city.

On 21 August, Lt. Gen. Abdul Amir Yarallah said the Counter-Terrorism Service (CTS) seized five villages southwest of Tal Afar and cut off a road leading to the city. The Federal Police and PMU that were deployed in Tal al-Housan village advanced 19 kilometers west of Tal Afar, destroying an ammunition and weapons stash. Additionally, Iraqi forces regained control of IS's 250 kilometer long tunnel network, killing 20 IS militants in the process. PMU shelling destroyed a telecommunications center and a soldiers department. In order to reduce the effectiveness of Iraqi airstrikes, IS set fire to several oil wells in Tal Afar. Some sources reported that as many as 400,000 Iraqi soldiers had been mobilized to the region in support of offensive operations in Tal Afar.

=== Iraqi forces enter Tal Afar ===
On 22 August, Abu Qatada al-Afri, an IS recruitment officer, was killed in central Tal Afar, along with four other members, in an airstrike. Iraqi army troops and the PMU entered central Tal Afar from the east. The PMU recaptured the Tarmi neighborhood with Iraqi Federal Police, located northwest of the town, and two districts in the northwest and southeast of the city. In addition, the PMU killed a total of 25 militants and exploded 12 devices in the southwest region of Tal Afar. The 16th Infantry Division captured two villages, an intersection, and an oil refinery from IS.

By the end of the day, Iraqi Army captured the districts of Al-Kifah, Al-Nur and al-Askari after entering the city from southeast and northwest. An operational map published by the Iraqi military showed about three-quarters of the city remaining under militant control. The al-Jazirah area, located east of Tal Afar, was also captured by Iraqi forces. It was estimated that up to 1,000 IS fighters still remained in the city.

On 23 August, Iraqi Special Operations Forces (ISOF) retook the southwestern edge of Tal Afar, while the Iraqi Police (IP) and paramilitary troops have taken over the northwestern edge.

Iraqi forces retook five villages and three neighborhoods in the east, south, and west of the city. In doing so, they took control over several strategic buildings. The Counter-Terrorism Service (CTS) played a part in the liberation of one of the neighborhoods, al-Mo'allameen. Lt. Gen. Yarallah said that the CTS "defused 752 improvised explosive devices and cleared seven booby-trapped houses" that day. Iraqi forces had also liberated Jolaq junction in Tal Afar. The Ninevah Council announced that more than 50 percent of Tal Afar had already been recaptured by the Iraqi government and that 31 neighborhoods were captured, and 302 IS militants had been killed so far.

=== Reaching the city center ===
By 25 August, Iraqi forces in the Tal Afar area captured over 30 neighborhoods and killed more than 300 IS militants, while also breaching the IS defense lines in the center of Tal Afar. A statement from the Iraqi Joint Operations Command (JOC) claimed that elite Iraqi units seized the northern neighborhoods of Nida', Taliaa, Uruba, Nasr, and Saad. A JOC map showed that approximately three quarters of Tal Afar were under Iraqi government control, but militants still controlled the city's northeast quarter.

Tal Afar center was captured by Iraqi forces, leaving 90 percent of the town under Iraqi government control. CTS cleared the old citadel and its surrounding neighborhood of Basatin of militants. Clashes still remain in the northern parts of the city. It was later reported that only five percent of the city remains under IS control as well. The CTS and Iraqi Police (IP) had also captured three districts and the Al-Rabia neighborhood, located west of the citadel. Iraqi forces had also taken over 14 villages, the Shaikh Ibrahim mountain, and the Zambar mountain range, liberating the southernmost part of the Tal Afar pocket held by IS before the offensive began.

=== Al-Ayadiya ===
Iraqi forces retook the entirety of Tal Afar by 27 August. Some speculate that the rapid downfall of the city was due to the siege, lack of civilians, which allowed Iraqi troops to use heavy artillery, and an overestimation of the fighters that remained in the city. Iraqi troops then headed towards the town of Al-Ayadia, in order to recapture the rest of the Tal Afar pocket.

Iraqi forces were reportedly slowed by snipers, booby-traps, and roadside bombs during their advance to Al-Ayadia. Lt. Col. Salah Kareem of the Iraqi Army stated that the most diehard IS militants had fled to the town from Tal Afar. Troops announced that complete victory in the battle would be declared when al-Ayadiya is captured.

Iraqi Federal Police service chief, Lt. Gen. Shaker Jawdat announced on 28 August that 50 percent of al-Ayadiya has been captured by Iraqi forces Lt. Gen. Yarallah announced on 30 August that tens of villages in the mountain areas in west and north of Aiyadhiya region, including the strategic Qulabash village, were captured from IS by Iraqi forces and that 29 IS militants had been killed.

Prime Minister Haider al-Abadi announced the capture of al-Ayadia district and declared victory in Tal Afar on 31 August. Iraqi military maps airdropped by the Iraqi air force a few hours after the victory declaration also show that the Nineveh province has now been cleared of IS as well.

Despite al-Abadi's declaration, fighting continued in al-Ayadiya. Pockets of resistance remained, with Iraqi forces still trying to clear out the remaining militants. Two military officers whose units were leading the battle said scattered militants were still hiding in houses and using tunnels. Four soldiers were killed while 10 were wounded in clashes. The Iraqi Army took full control of the area by 2 September.

Yarallah announced later on 2 September, that Iraqi forces killed over 2,000 militants and more than 50 suicide bombers, while destroying and detonating 77 car bombs, 71 booby-trapped buildings and 990 roadside bombs. He also said that 115 Iraqi soldiers were killed while 679 were wounded in the battle. Mahalabiyah and Ayadhiyah, which are a part of the 3,206 square kilometre Tal Afar area, were freed from IS militants during the offensive.

== Execution of captives ==
According to Human Rights Watch, Peshmerga forces executed up to 400 IS members early in September 2017, who were captured or surrendered north of Tal Afar during the battle for the city.

== Aftermath ==
On 20 September 2017, about three weeks after the end of the Tal Afar offensive, the Iraqi Army launched an offensive on the city of Hawija with the aim to recapture that pocket from IS.

== See also ==
- Western Nineveh offensive (2017)
- Western Anbar offensive (2017)
- 2017 Western Iraq campaign
