= Western Anbar offensive (2017) =

- Part of the US-led intervention in Iraq (2014–2021) and the War in Iraq (2013–2017)
Date	16–21 September 2017 (5 days)
Location	Western Anbar Governorate, Iraq 33.4167°N 43.3000°E
Result	Iraqi victory
Territorial changes	Iraqi forces recapture the towns of Akashat and Anah

Belligerents
(Iraq) Iraq; Supported by: CJTF–OIR	Islamic State

Commanders and leaders
(Iraq) Lt. Gen. Abdul Amir Yarallah	Abu Bakr al-Baghdadi (suspected)

Units involved
(Iraq) Iraqi pro-government forces: Iraqi security forces; Armed Forces; Federal Police; Local Sunni tribes; Popular Mobilization Forces	Military of the Islamic State

Strength
Thousands	8,000–10,000

Casualties and losses
Unknown	Unknown

The Western Anbar offensive (2017) was a military operation by the Iraqi Army against the Islamic State, in the western districts of the Province of Anbar and on the border with Syria.

The offensive was concurrent another offensive by the Iraqi government, the Hawija Offensive (2017), as well with the Raqqa campaign conducted by the Syrian Democratic Forces (SDF) against IS's former de facto capital city and stronghold in Syria, the Central Syria campaign (2017), and the 2017 Mayadin offensive.

== Background ==
Al-Qaim was known as a hotbed of jihadist insurgency, after the 2003 invasion of Iraq, with coalition forces carrying out repeated operations against Al-Qaeda jihadists. The strategic and porous border started becoming a route for foreign fighters entering Iraq from Syria, who was accused by Iraqi government of ignoring it.

The towns of western Anbar were captured by the Islamic State of Iraq and the Levant in 2014. Before the 2017 offensive, Iraqi forces had dislodged the group from key cities of Anbar including Ramadi and Fallujah but the areas near border with Syria including Anah, Rawa, Al-Qaim and the vast rural areas across the province remained under militant control. An Iraqi operation was launched towards west Anbar in January 2017, but was suspended after recapture of towns of Sagra and Zawiya because of preparations for retaking the western bank of Mosul.

The operation on Euphrates Valley was the first since recapture of Tal Afar in August 2017. According to Iraqi military, it aims to retake militant held-towns of Al-Qaim, Rawa and Anah, which formed one of the last two enclaves still held by IS in Iraq. From September 11 to September 16, Iraqi aircraft carried out airstrikes in the area, killing 306 militants, according to the Iraqi Army. On the evening of September 15, Iraqi warplanes dropped leaflets over Akashat, Anah, Rawa and Al-Qaim towns, urging civilians to take cover and calling on the militants to surrender.

== The offensive ==
=== Akashat ===
On September 16, Iraqi forces began the offensive, supported by the United States-led air alliance, to dislodge IS from the border with Syria to the south of the Euphrates, also aimed at tightening Iraq's hold on its border with Syria. According to military statements, the offensive on the Akashat region containing natural gas reserves, was also meant to pave the way for capturing IS-held towns along Euphrates valley. Later in the day, Iraqi military announced that it had captured Akashat. Lt. Gen. Abdul Amir Yarallah from the Iraqi Joint Operations Command (JOC) said the Hashd al-Shaabi and Iraqi border guards had also reopened a nearby strategic road besides capturing the town. In a separate statement, Hashd al-Shaabi added that troops captured the area after destroying defensive lines of the militants, used as a corridor to move between Syria and Iraq, leaving many of them killed and wounded.

=== Anah ===
On September 19, the Iraqi forces backed by US airstrikes began an assault on the militants in western Anbar. Iraqi military stated that a force composed of army units, police and tribal fighters launched the attack at dawn near the town of Anah. On the same day, Iraqi forces captured the village of al-Rayhana in the area. An Iraqi colonel told Agence-France Presse that the forces attacked it from three directions and seven militants were killed, with rest retreating to Anah. Yarallah from JOC announced on 21 September that Iraqi forces had completely captured Anah. A security source on the same day told Alghad Press that Mostafa Anwar Nayef, an IS field leader, was killed in al-Shishan district of the town.

== Aftermath ==
On September 23, a security source stated that ten IS leaders fled from Al-Qaim to unknown places. On the next day, Iraqi Defense Ministry's War Media Cell stated that five militants were killed while an IS headquarters in Rawa was destroyed by airstrikes of CJTF-OIR. Rageh al-Eissawi, a member of Anbar province council's security commission, stated on September 25 that Iraqi forces had launched wide-scale combing operations on roads leading to Rawa in preparation for an assault on it. He added that it coincided with air raids by Iraqi warplanes in the area. Iraqi Army's 7th Division backed by PMU killed 11 militants, including a wali, on September 26, in an assault on outskirts of Rawa. Security sources added that five rest houses of the group were also destroyed.

On September 27, the militants attacked and briefly took over areas near Ramadi according to security sources. The operation was likely meant to create a diversion against Iraq's offensives to dislodge the group from its last strongholds. Provincial police chief Major General Hadi Razij Kassar stated that security forces and tribes retook the Al-Tash, Majr and Kilometre Seven districts and all the militants were killed. A general meanwhile told that 20 militants were killed. A military source in a Ramadi hospital said two security personnel were killed and 18 civilians wounded. Maj. Gen. Hadi Rezeij, chief of Anbar police, stated on October 1 that fifty IS fighters were killed while 30 vehicles of the group were destroyed when troops thwarted the attack on Ramadi on September 27.

The Iraqi Interior Ministry stated on September 30 that 40 militants were killed while others were wounded in airstrikes. The ministry also added that a rest house and a booby-trapping workshop of the group were destroyed in Al-Qaim. Meanwhile, a security source stated that CJTF-OIR warplanes killed a senior IS leader named Marawan Mohamed Ali Ismail. A security source stated on October 9 that IS had started sending its fighter and equipment from Al-Qaim to Anbar's desert. Special presidential envoy Brett McGurk stated on 12 October that Iraqi forces were shifting en masse from Kirkuk to Anbar, and was heading there to drive IS out of the border region with Syria. The military announced on 25 October that they were about to launch an offensive to retake last territory under IS control, with Iraqi Air Force dropping leaflets in Rawa and Al-Qaim.

On October 26, Prime Minister al-Abadi announced an offensive to recapture the western border region of Al-Qaim and Rawah.

== See also ==
- Anbar campaign (2013–14)
- Battle of Ramadi (2014–15)
- 2nd Anbar
  - 2nd Ramadi
  - Siege of Fallujah (2016)
  - Battle of Fallujah (2016)
- Mosul offensive (2016)
  - 4th Mosul
  - Western Nineveh
- Battle of Tal Afar (2017)
- Hawija Offensive (2017)
- 2017 Euphrates Crossing offensive
