= Timeline of the War in Iraq (2015) =

This is a timeline of events during the War in Iraq in 2015.

== Chronology ==
=== January ===
- January 8 – A suicide bomber targets a police checkpoint in the town of Youssifiyah, killing seven people.
- January 21 - Beginning of the Mosul Offensive in which Peshmerga forces captured large amount of territory surrounding Mosul.
- January 25 As many as 21 Arab-Iraqi civilians were killed in the village of Kocho by Yazidi militias in retaliation for the Sinjar massacre.
- January 26 – Iraqi forces recapture the entire province of Diyala from Islamic State.
- January 29 – Battle of Kirkuk (2015) begins.

=== February ===
- February 1 – Kurdish forces overcome ISIL militants in the city of Kirkuk.
- February 24 – Multiple bomb attacks around Baghdad kill 37 people and wound dozens.

=== March ===
- March 2 – Second Battle of Tikrit begins.
- March 25 – American airstrikes on Tikrit, several Shiite militias go on strike.

=== April ===
- April – May: Al-Karmah offensive
- April 1 – After a month of hard fighting, Iranians, Iraqis and Shiite militia overcome ISIL fighters and take Tikrit.

=== May ===
- May 15: ISIL seizes control of the main Government building and city centre in Ramadi, the provincial capital of Anbar Province.
- May 20: ISIL captures Ramadi.

=== June ===
- June 4: ISIS fighters close Ramadi dam gates, cut off water to loyalist towns
- June 13: Militants attack government forces near Iraq's Baiji refinery, killing 11 near the city of Baiji as part of the battle for control of Iraq's biggest refinery.

=== July ===
- July 13: Anbar offensive begins.
- July 17: A suicide bomber detonated a car bomb in a marketplace in the city of Khan Bani Saad during Eid al-Fitr celebrations, killing 120–130 people and injuring 130 more. Twenty more people were reported missing after the bombing.
- July 23: Turkey begins bombing alleged PKK bases in Northern Iraq.

=== August ===
- August 1: Kurdish Peshmerga forces launched a new offensive against ISIS near Kirkuk and Sinjar. The US-led coalition conducted multiple airstrikes around Mosul targeting ISIS facilities.
- August 2: Iraqi forces advanced south of Ramadi in Anbar Province with support from US airstrikes. Prime Minister Haider al-Abadi announced an upcoming major reform plan amid widespread anti-corruption protests.
- August 3: On the anniversary of the Yazidi genocide, UN officials reaffirmed that ISIS crimes against the Yazidis constitute genocide. Kurdish forces fortified Sinjar Mountain against possible ISIS attacks.
- August 4: ISIS executed dozens of civilians in Falluja for allegedly collaborating with Iraqi forces. Anti-government protests intensified in Baghdad amid a severe heatwave.
- August 5: Iraqi forces made limited advances around Haditha in Anbar Province. Shiite militias under the Popular Mobilization Forces launched operations west of Baghdad targeting ISIS cells.
- August 6: Coalition airstrikes targeted ISIS positions in Mosul, reportedly causing heavy casualties. Political pressure mounted on Prime Minister Abadi to implement reforms.
- August 7: Thousands of protesters gathered in Tahrir Square, Baghdad, demanding an end to sectarian quotas and systemic corruption. Grand Ayatollah Ali al-Sistani publicly endorsed the protests.
- August 8: Prime Minister Abadi presented a seven-point reform plan, including ending sectarian quotas and downsizing the government. ISIS shelled Kurdish-held villages near Kirkuk.
- August 9: Iraqi Parliament voted unanimously to approve Abadi's proposed reforms. Mass rallies across the country showed rare unity among different ethnic and sectarian groups.
- August 10: The Iraqi government began abolishing senior governmental posts, including the positions of vice presidents and deputy prime ministers. ISIS executed alleged defectors in Mosul.
- August 11: Iraqi forces retook the University of Anbar in Ramadi. ISIS counterattacks south of Mosul were repelled by Kurdish forces.
- August 12: Fresh protests erupted in Baghdad, calling for reforms within the judiciary system. ISIS car bomb attacks killed dozens in mainly Shiite areas of the capital.
- August 13: ISIS suicide bombers attacked a Shiite mosque in Baqubah, Diyala province, killing at least 20 people. Iraqi forces consolidated control over key supply routes in Anbar Province.
- August 13: 2015 Baghdad market truck bombing
- August 21: ISIS imposes a curfew on Mosul after residents spray anti-ISIS graffiti on several walls.

=== October ===
- On October 22, Iraqi Security forces and the Popular Mobilization forces finished recapturing the city of Baiji, Iraq, its oil refinery and the surrounding region.

=== November ===
- November 13: Kurdish forces take control of Sinjar from ISIS after it was seized by IS forces in August 2014.

=== December ===
- December 16–17: Nineveh Plains offensive in which hundreds of ISIL fighters mount an attack against Kurdish positions but are repelled.

== See also ==
- 2015 in Iraq
- Terrorist incidents in Iraq in 2015
- Timeline of ISIL-related events (2015)
- Timeline of the Iraq War (2014)
- Timeline of the Iraq War (2016)
- Timeline of the Iraq War (2017)
