= 2017 Bajaur bombing =

- Part of War in North-West Pakistan
- Bajour (Pakistan)
- Location: 34°24′17.76″N 72°33′32.16″E; Bajaur Agency, FATA, Pakistan
- Date: August 11, 2017; Morning (PST)
- Target: Laborers
- Attack type: Bombing
- Weapon: Improvised explosive device
- Deaths: 3
- Injuries: 24
- Victim: Labourers

On 11 August 2017, an Improvised explosive device exploded near a passing truck at Nawagai area of Bajaur Agency, FATA, Pakistan. The explosion left three people dead while 24 others were wounded.

== Background ==
The current attack came two days after a suicide attack that killed four Pak soldiers in Upper Dir as they were carrying out an intelligence based operation against militants. The truck attacked was carrying laborers who were working with armed forces in construction of check post along Durand Line.

== Bombing ==
A truck, carrying local labourers, was targeted by a remote-controlled improvised explosive device (IED) planted roadside. As a result of the explosion, two labourers died on the spot while another succumbed to his injuries while being rushed to the hospital. 24 laborers were wounded out of whom most were in critical condition. Six of the wounded were airlifted to Peshawar.

=== Victims ===
The deceased were identified as Khairur Rehman, Rahim Zada and Muslim Khan and their funeral prayer was offered at Government Compound in Charmang area of Bajour. The funeral was attended by the sector commander north, the commandment Bajaur Scout and other high official.

== Aftermath and reactions ==
Following the explosion, security forces cordoned off the area and started search operation.

The Governor of Khyber Pakhtunkhwa Barrister Masood Kausar has condemned blast and expressed shock over this "gruesome act of terrorism" which claimed many innocent lives and injuries to dozens others. In a statement the Governor said that the terrorist were bent upon to intimidate the people of Bajaur Agency fort their struggle against terrorism and restoration of peace in the Agency. The people of Bajaur Agency, he added had exercised immense courage and valor to root the terrorist element out of the Agency and were ready to offer more sacrifices for the maintenance of peace in the Agency.

== See also ==
- Terrorist incidents in Pakistan in 2017
