= 2017 Tikrit attacks =

Terrorist incident in Iraq

- Part of the War in Iraq (2013–2017)
- Location: Tikrit, Iraq
- Date: 4 April 2017
- Weapon: Explosive belt
- Deaths: 35
- Injuries: 42+
- Perpetrator: Islamic State

On 4 April 2017, several Islamic State militants disguised as military personnel killed at least 35 people in Tikrit, 14 of which were members of security forces.

== The attacks ==
The attack occurred late on the night of April 4, when 10 IS militants disguised in police uniform attacked a security checkpoint and stormed the house of a police colonel in Zuhour, a neighborhood in Tikrit. The clashes resulted in the killing of at least five IS militants; three were shot dead, while two others detonated their explosive vests, according to a security source.

== See also ==
- List of terrorist incidents in April 2017
