= Al-Faqma ice cream parlor bombing =

2017 suicide bombing in Baghdad, Iraq

Coordinates: 33.2884°N 44.4071°E

- Al-Faqma ice cream parlor (Baghdad)
- Location: Baghdad, Iraq
- Date: 30 May 2017
- Deaths: 26–30+
- Injuries: 40+
- Perpetrator: Islamic State

On 30 May 2017, an ice cream parlor in Karrada district of Baghdad, Iraq was attacked by an IS suicide bomber, killing at least 26 people.

== Attack ==
The bombing took place shortly after midnight, when the car bomb that was parked near the ice cream shop detonated. Islamic State have said the blast targeted Shia followers. The bombing occurred during Ramadan and was timed to target families going out for ice cream after iftar.
