= Tal Afar =

Tal Afar تَلْعَفَر
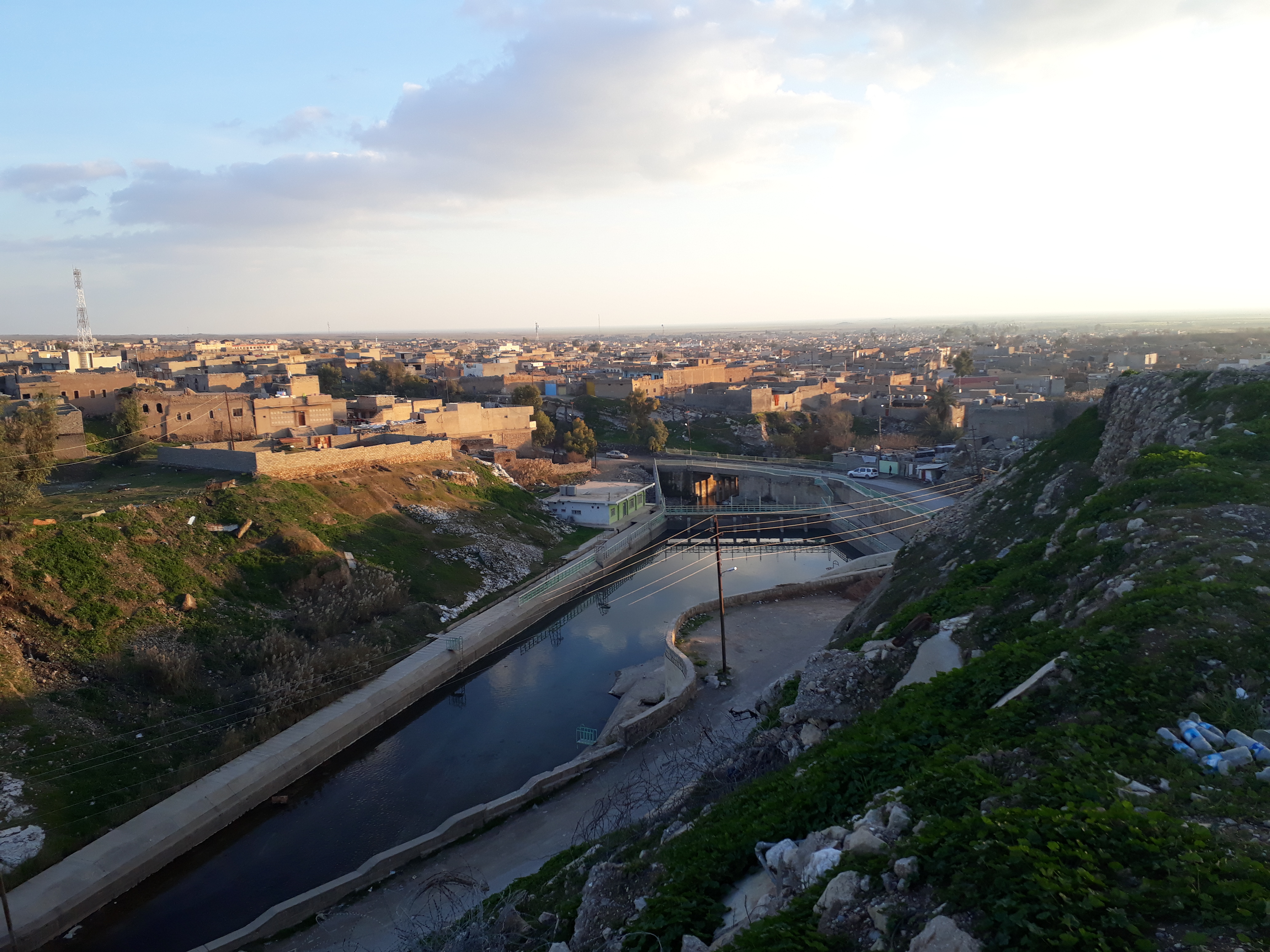
- Tal Afar Citadel

- Location of Tel Afar within Iraq
- Coordinates: 36°22′27″N 42°26′36″E
- Country: Iraq
- Governorate: Nineveh Governorate
- District: Tel Afar District
- Elevation: 1,350 ft (410 m)

Population (2024)
  - Total: 215,000
- Time zone: UTC+03:00 (AST)

Tal Afar (Arabic: تَلْعَفَر, romanized: Talʿafar, IPA: [talˈʕafar]; Turkish: Telafer, تلعفر) is a city in the Nineveh Governorate of northwestern Iraq, located 63 km (39 mi) west of Mosul, 52 km (32 mi) east of Sinjar and 200 km (120 mi) northwest of Kirkuk. Its local inhabitants are exclusively Turkmens.

While no official census data exists, the city, which had previously been estimated to have a population of approximately 200,000, had dropped to 80,000 as of 2007. In 2003, Tal Afar's Turkmen population in the city center was about 55 percent Shia, while 45 percent was Sunni. On 27 April 2025, Baghdad Today reported of an ongoing government initiative to convert Tal Afar District into the 20th governorate of Iraq. The proposed name of the new governorate is Jazira.

== History ==
=== Prehistory ===
10 kilometres (6.2 mi) southwest of the town of Tal Afar are the mounds of Yarim Tepe which yielded remains from the Halafian culture of the Hassuna, Halaf and Ubaid periods, between 7000 and 4500 BC.

=== Assyrian Empire ===
From perhaps the 5th century BC through to the 7th century AD it was an integral part of Assyria.

=== Ottoman Empire ===
The British military officer and traveler Frederick Forbes, who journeyed through northern Mesopotamia in the early 19th century, described Tal Afar in his 1838 travel account:

There is no bazar or market-place in the town, and only a few shops, such as those of the blacksmith, carpenter, and tanner; the latter is the only Christian inhabitant, all the others being Musulmans, a mixture of Arabs and Kurds. The language generally spoken is Kurdish, but Arabic is also commonly understood.

The English traveller, archaeologist, and future diplomat Austen Henry Layard—one day to become the United Kingdom's Ambassador to the Ottoman Empire—wrote in his book 1867 book Nineveh and Its Remains:

Tel Afer was once a town of some importance; it is mentioned by the early Arab geographers, and may perhaps be identified with the Telassar of Isaiah, referred to, as it is, in connection with Gozan and Haran. It has been three times besieged, within a few years, by Ali Pasha of Baghdad, Hafiz Pasha, and Injeh Bairakdar Mohammed Pasha. On each occasion the inhabitants offered a vigorous resistance. Mohammed Pasha took the place by assault. More than two-thirds of the inhabitants were put to the sword, and the property of the remainder was confiscated. Great wealth is said to have been discovered in the place, on its pillage by Mohammed Pasha, who took all the gold and silver, and distributed the remainder of the spoil amongst his soldiers.

Nelida Fuccaro wrote "After Hafiz Pasha's expedition in 1837 Tall 'Afar was occupied permanently by Ottoman Turkish troops and started to be used as a base to control the movements of a number of the rebellious Yazidi tribes of the Sinjar region to the west. In the 1880s Tall 'Afar became an administrative unit depending on the Sinjar qadha."

Sometime during the Ottoman Empire, the Ottoman Army founded the city as a sole military outpost constructed on top of a hill. Remains of the fortress can still be seen today. Also garrisoned at the fortress were Turkmen members of the Daloodi tribe who following the withdrawal of the Ottoman Army became the first civilian occupants of the town built around the fortress. Aylmer Haldane, the British General Officer Commanding Mesopotamia, described Tel Afar as "That town of ten thousand Turcoman inhabitants is picturesquely situated on four knolls, which stand two on each side of a deep gully, whence rises a stream which supplies the inhabitants with water."

=== 1920 Iraqi Revolt ===
After the fall of the Ottoman Empire, Tal Afar was included in Iraq. In 1920, Tal Afar was used as a base of operations for a planned revolt against the then ruling British.

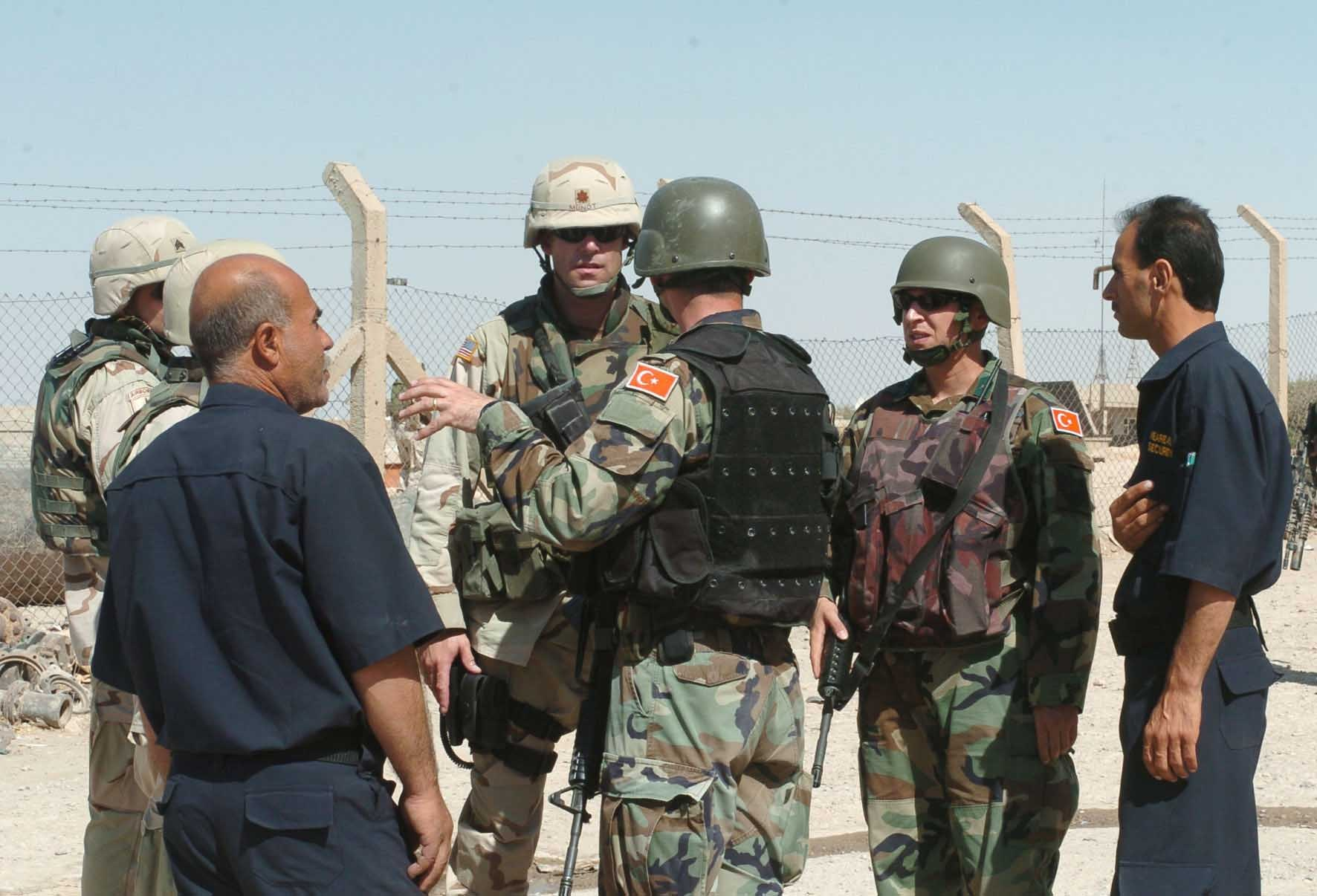
Soldiers from 416th Civil Affairs Battalion and Turkish military observers speak with local officials assessing the damages to local infrastructure.

=== Operation Black Typhoon ===
On September 9, 2004, a major military operation was launched against Tal Afar by the 3rd Brigade, 2nd Infantry Division (Stryker Brigade Combat Team) and Iraqi Security forces. Fighting continued until September 12, 2004, when the government of Turkey claimed that the fighting had taken the lives of approximately 58 ethnic Turkmen civilians and demanded an end to military operations at which time the civilians camped outside Tal Afar were allowed to return to their homes.

=== Operation Restoring Rights ===
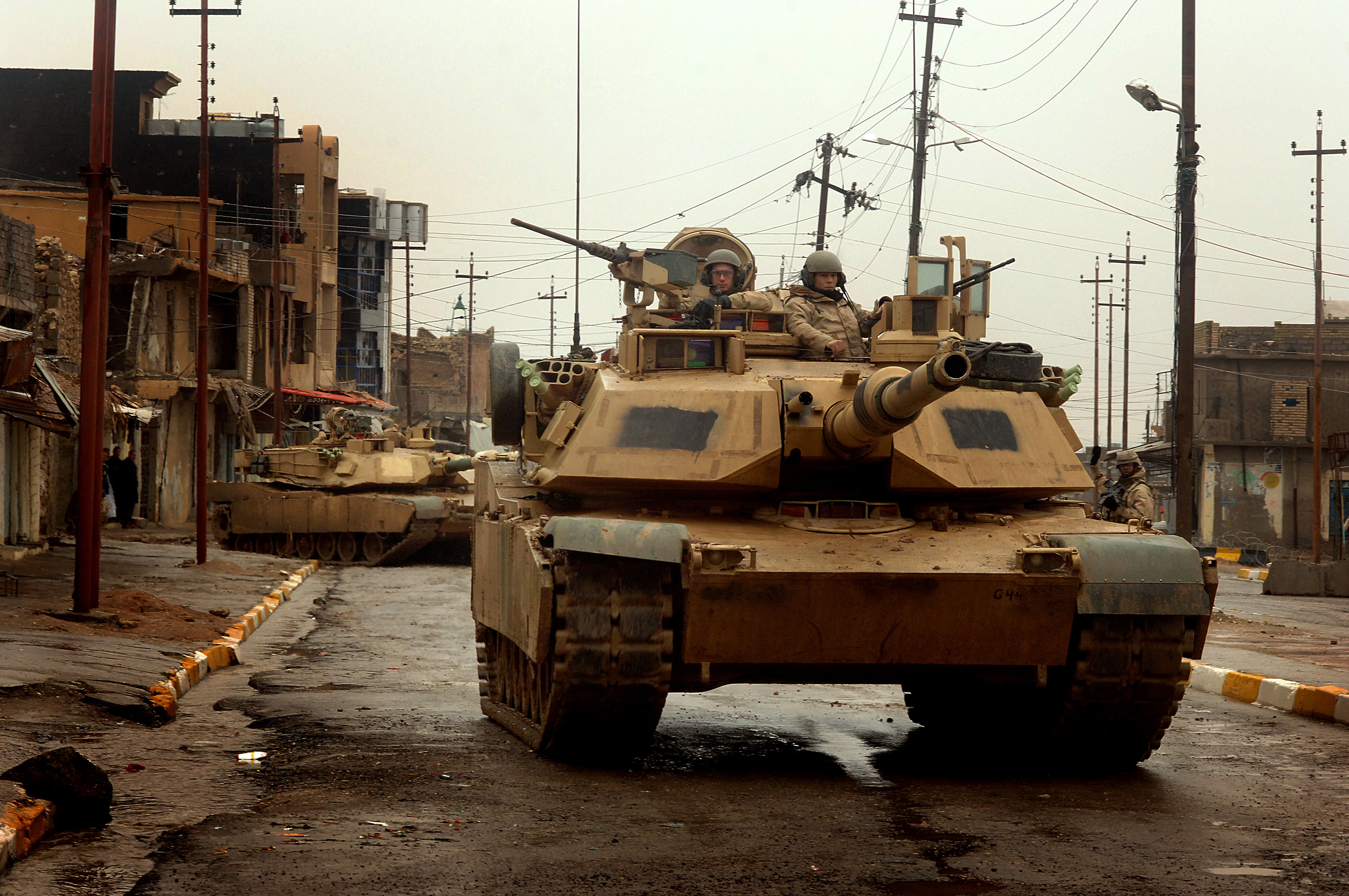
U.S. M1 Abrams battle tanks patrolling Tal Afar on February 3, 2006

In September 2005, Operation Restoring Rights was conducted in which approximately 5,000 soldiers from the 3rd Division of the Iraqi Security Force in conjunction with 3,500 troops (Bob Woodward cites the number 5,300 troops in his book The War Within) from the U.S. Army's 3rd Armored Cavalry Regiment and the 325th Airborne Infantry Regiment, 82nd Airborne Division entered the city. The operation resulted in 157 insurgents being killed and 683 captured. Iraqi Security Forces suffered 12 killed and 27 wounded. The operation lasted until October and resulted in 10,000 pounds of explosives being uncovered and destroyed. Abu Musab al-Zarqawi accused the American military of using "poisonous gases" on Tal Afar in an audiotape received and posted on an Islamic website. The United States denied using chemical weapons in Tal Afar saying such reports were propaganda created by al-Zarqawi, and were false and without merit.

The operation tested a new strategy of "clear, hold, build", in which areas would be purged of insurgents and then occupied and then rebuilt to win support from local people before being handed over to the Iraqi security forces.

In March 2006, U.S. President George W. Bush pointed to Tal Afar as a success story, where one could "see the outlines of the Iraq we've been fighting for". The operation was considered one of the first successful counterinsurgency operations in Iraq. Colonel H.R. McMaster, commander of the operation became an advisor to General David Petraeus in the planning and execution of the 2007 troop surge. However, after years of intermittent violence, some commentators have said that the optimism expressed in 2005 was overstated.

=== Post-invasion violence ===
Tal Afar has also been the scene of sectarian violence between Shiite and Sunni Muslims.

Before the invasion of Iraq sectarian violence between Turkmens had not been a problem. Their shared cultural background had united Sunni and Shia Turkmens. Political mobilisation in Tal Afar had until then been dominated by the Baath party. With no readily available movement to replace Saddam's Baathists, the collapse of the state disrupting everything from food to security and increasing distrust towards the Shia dominated Iraqi government, tensions started to arise. Grievances were stoked further when Sunni Islamists began to move into the town and Shia Iraqi security forces began purging Sunni's from the police force.

In May 2005, clashes broke out between the two groups. In October 2006, a bombing in Tal Afar killed 14 people, of whom ten were civilians and four Iraqi soldiers. An additional bombing, outside a car dealership, on November 24, 2006, killed at least 22 and wounded at least 26.

On February 10, 2007, a suicide car bomber killed one Iraqi soldier and wounded five people, including three civilians, as it targeted an army checkpoint. On February 22, 2007, four people were killed, including a policeman and a 12-year-old boy, and five were wounded, including two policemen, when two booby-trapped houses detonated while police were searching homes. During the search, a policeman shot and killed a suspect and wounded two others. Police had already reported the death of one policeman. On March 24, 2007, a suicide bomber in a market in the town killed eight people and wounded ten. On March 27, 2007, a truck bomb exploded in a market in a Shiite area. It was first reported to have killed 83 people and wounded 183, but the Iraqi Interior Ministry later raised the death toll to 152 and said that 347 were wounded, which would make it the deadliest single strike since the war started. The explosion, for which a terrorist group linked to ISI claimed responsibility, led to reprisal shootings by Shiite policemen and others against Sunnis, in which between 47 and 70 men were killed. Several Shiite policemen were arrested for taking part in the shootings. On April 14, 2007, a sniper shot dead a woman. On May 21, 2007, a roadside bomb exploded near a police patrol, wounding three policemen on the main road between the town of Sinjar and Tal Afar. On May 31, 2007, a roadside bomb targeting a police patrol wounded four policemen on the road between Sinjar and Tal Afar. In a separate incident a roadside bomb targeting an Iraqi army patrol killed an officer and wounded another soldier in Tal Afar. In another separate incident a man was killed in a rocket attack. On June 11, 2007, two people were killed and five wounded by a Katyusha rocket attack. On June 19, 2007, a woman and a child were killed by a mortar attack in the town. On July 12, 2007, seven guests celebrating the wedding of an Iraqi policeman were killed by a suicide bomber. On July 15, 2007, two civilians were killed and three wounded by a roadside bomb. On August 6, 2007, a car bomb killed 27 and wounded 28 people in the nearby village of al-Guba. On August 22, 2007, a roadside bomb exploded near workers laying water pipes, killing two and wounding five. On September 16, 2007, at least two policemen were wounded by a roadside bomb in the centre of the town. On September 22, 2007, one insurgent was killed and another wounded when a bomb they were making exploded. On September 24, 2007, a suicide truck bomb killed at least six people, including two policemen and a soldier, and wounded 17 in an attack on a checkpoint near a village between Tal Afar and Mosul. On October 4, 2007, a suicide car bomber killed three people and wounded 57 in a market. On October 10, 2007, a Katyusha rocket landed on a house, killing five members of the same family and wounding five others. On December 29, 2007, police killed five insurgents and detained five others.

On January 3, 2008, two civilians, including a child, died when U.S. forces returned fire after a roadside bomb struck a convoy that included the police chief. On January 19, 2008, a rocket attack killed seven people and wounded 20., On February 15, 2008, at least three people were killed and 16 wounded in a double suicide bombing. After a police officer guarding a mosque prevented a bomber from entering the building, the attacker tried to throw a hand grenade and then detonated the explosive vest he was wearing. A few minutes later, another bomber ran towards a group of worshipers and blew himself up as police opened fire. On February 20, 2008, a suicide car bomber killed a woman and a six-year-old girl, and wounded eight, in an attack on an identity cards office. On March 2, 2008, clashes between gunmen and police killed 13 gunmen and two policemen in a village near the town. On April 14, 2008, an attacker wearing a suicide vest blew himself up at a Shi'ite funeral, killing four civilians and wounding 22. On May 27, 2008, four people were killed and 46 wounded, including two children, when a parked car bomb blew up in a market, the town's mayor, Najim Abdullah, said. On July 8, 2008, gunmen killed a member of the Sunni Arab Iraqi Islamic party, police said. On July 12, 2008, police found the bodies of seven people, including a woman and a child, the town's mayor said. They had been kidnapped two days earlier. On July 17, 2008, a car bomb exploded in a street market killing 20 people, including nine children, and wounding 90. On July 31, 2008, a roadside bomb killed a policeman, police said. On August 8, 2008, a lone Sunni Turkman suicide bomber (initial reports said a parked car) exploded in a vegetable market killing 25 people and injuring about 70. On August 29, 2008, policemen killed a would-be suicide bomber who tried to enter a mosque. On September 6, 2008, a car bomb exploded near shops and cafes killing at least six people and wounding at least 50. On September 17, 2008, a roadside bomb wounded four civilians. On September 18, 2008, two roadside bombs wounded nine civilians. On September 20, 2008, a suicide car bomb attack near a football playground killed two people and left 18 wounded. On November 15, 2008, a car bomb exploded and killed 10 people and injured 31 more. On December 2, 2008, a suicide car bomb exploded at a police checkpoint killing five people and wounding 30.

On February 6, 2009, gunmen in a moving car opened fire and killed two civilians, police said. On March 23, 2009, a suicide bomber killed an off-duty police officer and wounded five civilians, according to police. On July 9, 2009, 33 people were killed by two suspected suicide bomb attacks. Police reported that more than 70 were injured. On September 17, 2009, a suicide bomber drove a truck into a police checkpoint, killing three civilians and wounding three policeman. On September 28, 2009, two suspected insurgents were killed and a third was wounded in an explosives accident. On October 16, 2009, a gunman opened fire and then detonated a suicide belt, killing 15 and injuring 100 during Friday Prayer inside the Taqua Mosque, which is attended primarily by Sunni Muslims.

=== Coming of ISIL ===
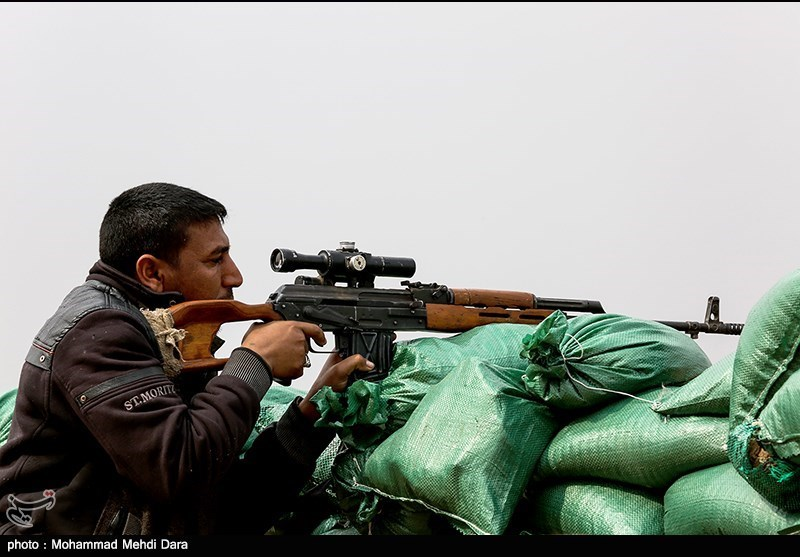
Popular Mobilization Forces in Tal Afar

On 14 May 2010, an attacker detonated explosives hidden inside a vehicle at the entrance to the football stadium, killing ten people and injuring 120 others. Earlier, the Islamic State of Iraq warned Shiites of "dark days soaked with blood". "What is happening to you nowadays is just a drizzle," said Abu Suleiman al-Naser, the group's "minister of war". On March 7, 2012, at least 12 people were killed in a coordinated car- and suicide bombing attack in the Shia neighbourhood.

ISIL captured Tal Afar on June 16, 2014, after a two-day battle. The city was poorly defended due to the disarray of Iraqi forces in the region following the fall of Mosul. In July it was reported that the Sheikh Jawad Al-Sadiq Mosque was destroyed by ISIL, using explosives.

=== Battle of Tal Afar (2017) ===
On 20 August 2017, the Iraqi Army announced it had launched a new offensive to retake Tal Afar from the ISIL forces. On the same day, it recaptured four neighborhoods in Tal Afar (Abra al-Najjar, Abra Hansh, al-Abra al-Kabira, and Abra al-Saghir) The city itself was recaptured by Iraqi forces on August 27, 2017. The remaining ISIS-held areas in Tal Afar district were then fully captured on August 31, 2017.

=== ISIS aftermath ===
Many of the Turkmen of Tal Afar have been displaced and moved to areas further south in Iraq ever since ISIL captured the area. Many have also joined Iraqi forces fighting ISIL.

== Geography ==
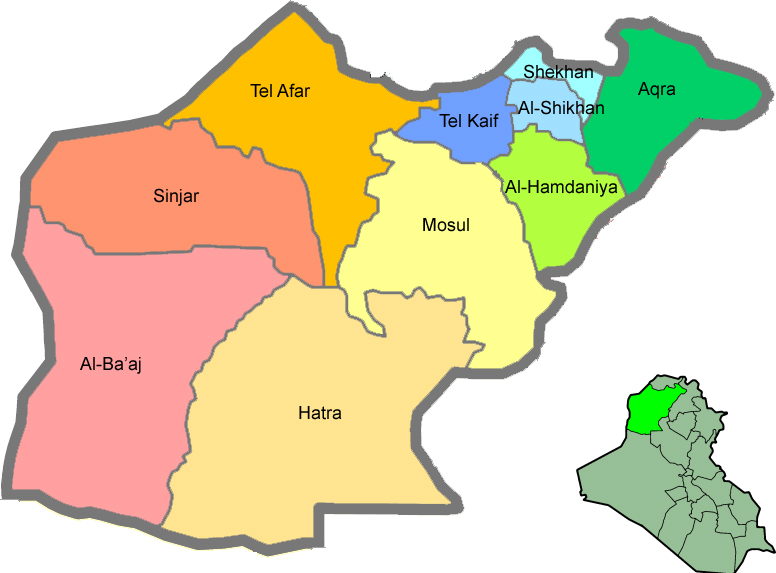
Districts of Nineveh

Tal Afar is located approximately 50 km west of Mosul and 60 km east of the Iraqi–Syrian border, at coordinate 36°23′N 42°27′E. According to map data, it has a total area of 15 km^{2}.

Tal Afar is located in the gap between the anticlines of Jabal Zambar to the southeast and Jebel Sasan to the northwest. The city is located in an open desert plain at the southern base of the Aedea Mountains. Much of the terrain surrounding the city is flat desert. A major east–west highway, which spans Nineveh Governorate and intersects Iraq's main central north–south highway near Mosul, runs through the city.

The city of Tal Afar is organized into eighteen neighborhoods or districts: Sa'ad, Qadisiyah, Todd A-O, Sara, Mohalemeen, Madlomin, Uruba, Wahada, Nida, A'a lot, Hassan Qoi, Mothana, Khadra, Jazeera, Taliha, Kifah, Malain and Qalah (Turkish: Kale).

Each neighborhood maintains its identity due to the tribal nature of the city. Several dozen extended families living in close proximity will typically identify with one local sheikh who takes it upon himself to serve as steward of the neighborhood's citizens and liaison to the local government. The layout of the town consists of densely packed buildings, often constructed so closely to each other that they share common load-bearing walls and supports. The city's streets further physically define each neighborhood by separating it from other groups of buildings, since they cut through the town in irregular patterns.

The United States Army and local government implemented a home address system to better identify specific locations and define jurisdiction for the Iraqi Police in the second half of the 2000s.

== Economy ==
In January 2007, the largest single employer in the city was the Iraqi Ministry of the Interior, which had hired roughly 2,250 policemen. The second-largest employer was the United States government. The 101st Airborne 3rd Brigade was stationed at Tal Afar Airbase in 2003–04 and its 1st Battalion was stationed in the town proper.

== Landmarks ==
The Tal Afar Citadel, a ruined Ottoman fortress, is located in the center of the city. Local history states that British administrators augmented the structure of the original fortress. During the 2003 invasion of Iraq, the fortress was further augmented and made to house the city's mayoral, municipal and police headquarters. The neighborhood including and surrounding the fortress is known as Qalah or "Castle".

Large parts of the citadel were blown up by the Islamic State of Iraq and the Levant in December 2014.

The most prominent historical site in the city is the Tal Afar Citadel, an Ottoman-era fortress built on a hill at the centre of the town. The citadel suffered severe damage in 2014 when ISIL militants blew up parts of its historic walls and main gates. However, in early 2024, the Nineveh Antiquities and Heritage Inspectorate launched a comprehensive rehabilitation project to rebuild the damaged walls and restore the citadel to its former historical structure.

== Politics and government ==
Tal Afar's local government consists of a city council, local sheikhs and a mayor. The mayor is appointed by the council of sheikhs and confirmed by the provincial regional administrator. The mayor need not be originally from the city nor Iraqi Turkmen. The mayor from 2005 to 2008 was Najim Abdullah Abed al-Jabouri, a Sunni Arab originally from Qayyarah.

The Iraqi Turkmen demographic of Tal Afar and its geographic location have made it an important city in the argument for Iraqi federalism. Following a program of "Arabization" initiated by Saddam Hussein in the 1970s, large numbers of Sunni Arabs supportive of the Baathist government were moved into areas around Tal Afar. Geographically, the region the city is located in is a border area separating Kurdish lands to the north and Arab lands to the south in the Al Anbar governorate.

== People from Tal Afar ==
- Abu Muslim al-Turkmani, ISIL deputy leader (c. 1959 – 18 August 2015)
- Abdul Nasser Qardash, ISIL official (born c. 1967)
- Abu Ibrahim al-Hashimi al-Qurashi, ISIL leader (1976 – 3 February 2022)
