= Tel Afar District =

Tel Afar District قضاء تلعفر Turkish: Telafer
- District
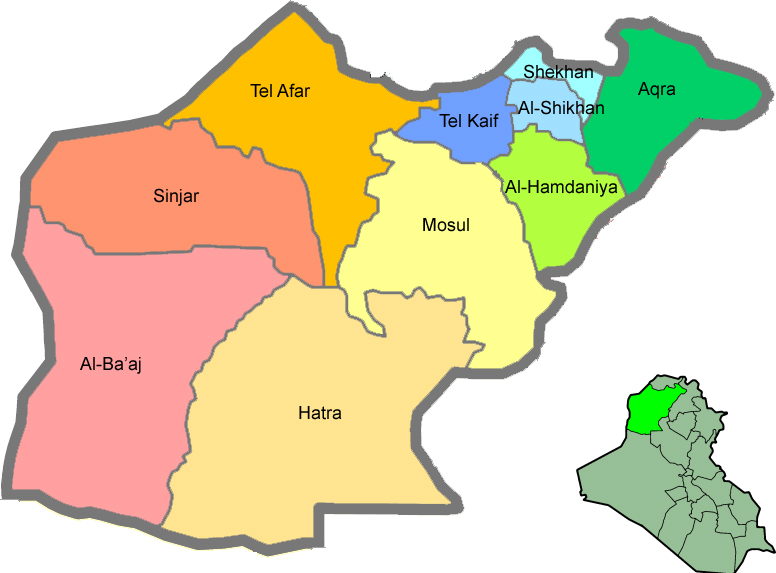
- Tel Afar (orange) in Ninawa governorate
- Interactive map of Tel Afar District
- Country: Iraq
- Governorate: Nineveh
- Seat: Tal Afar

Area
  - Total: 4,453 km^{2} (1,719 sq mi)

Population (2003)
  - Total: 300,878
- Time zone: UTC+3 (AST)

Tel Afar District (Arabic: قضاء تلعفر; Turkish: Telafer) is a district in Nineveh Governorate, Iraq. Its administrative center is the city of Tal Afar. Other towns include Rabia, Zummar, and al-Ayadia. It is predominantly populated by Iraqi Turkmens, followed by minorities of Arabs and Kurds.

On 27 April 2025, Baghdad Today reported of an ongoing government initiative to convert the Tel Afar district into the 20th governorate of Iraq. The proposed name of the new governorate is Jazira.
