= Lahore bombing =

Lahore bombing may refer to these bombings in Lahore:

- 2008 Lahore suicide bombings, by the Tehrik-i-Taliban Pakistan (TTP)
- May 2009 Lahore attack, bombing by TTP
- December 2009 Lahore attacks, by TTP
- 2010 Lahore bombings (disambiguation)
  - March 2010 Lahore bombings, by TTP
  - 2010 Ahmadiyya mosques massacre in May, by TTP
  - 2010 Data Darbar bombings in July, by Jamaat-ul-Ahrar/TTP
  - September 2010 Lahore bombings
- 2013 Lahore bombing, by the Balochistan Liberation Army
- Lahore church bombings in 2015, by Jamaat-ul-Ahrar/TTP
- 2016 Lahore suicide bombing, by Jamaat-ul-Ahrar/TTP
- 2017 Lahore suicide bombing (disambiguation)
  - February 2017 Lahore suicide bombing, by Jamaat-ul-Ahrar/TTP
  - April 2017 Lahore suicide bombing, by TTP
  - July 2017 Lahore suicide bombing, by TTP
  - August 2017 Lahore bombing, by TTP
- 2019 Lahore bombing, by Hizbul Ahrar/TTP
- 2021 Lahore bombing
- 2022 Lahore bombing, by the Baloch Nationalist Army

== See also ==
- Lahore (disambiguation)
- 2009 Lahore police academy attack in March, by Fedayeen al-Islam/TTP
- 2009 attack on the Sri Lanka national cricket team in March, by Lashkar-e-Jhangvi
- 2014 Wagah border suicide attack, near Lahore by Jamaat-ul-Ahrar/TTP and Jundallah
