= Charsadda attack =

Charsadda attack may refer to these attacks in Charsadda, Khyber Pakhtunkhwa, Pakistan during the insurgency in Khyber Pakhtunkhwa:

- April 2007 Charsadda bombing
- 2007 Charsadda mosque bombing
- 2008 Charsadda bombing
- 2011 Charsadda bombing
- Bacha Khan University attack, in 2016
- 2017 Charsadda suicide bombing
- Charsadda arson attack, in 2021

== See also ==
- Charsadda (disambiguation)
- Babrra massacre, 1948 massacre of civilians by Pakistan Police in Charsadda
