= April 2007 Charsadda bombing =

2007 suicide attack in Pakistan

- Part of Insurgency in Khyber Pakhtunkhwa
- Location: Charsadda, North-West Frontier Province, Pakistan
- Date: 28 April 2007
- Attack type: Suicide bombing
- Weapon: Explosive belt
- Deaths: 28
- Injuries: 52

On 28 April 2007, at least 28 people were killed and about 52 others wounded in a suicide bombing at a political rally in Charsadda, North-West Frontier Province, Pakistan. The injured included Interior Minister Aftab Ahmad Khan Sherpao. Shortly before the bomber detonated his explosive belt, security guards stopped him from getting closer to Sherpao, whom he was three metres (10 feet) away from at the time of the explosion.

Charsadda later suffered major insurgent attacks in December 2007, February 2008, May 2011, January 2016 and February 2017, mainly carried out by internationally designated terrorist group Tehrik-i-Taliban Pakistan.

== See also ==
- Terrorist incidents in Pakistan in 2007
