= 2007 Charsadda mosque bombing =

Terrorist Attack

- Part of Insurgency in Khyber Pakhtunkhwa
- Location of Khyber Pakhtunkhwa in Pakistan
- Location: Charsadda District, North-West Frontier Province, Pakistan
- Date: 21 December 2007
- Target: Mosque
- Attack type: Suicide bombings
- Weapon: Explosive belts
- Deaths: 50
- Injuries: 100
- Perpetrator: Unknown

On 21 December 2007, at least 50 people were killed and 100 others injured by a suicide bombing in Charsadda District, North-West Frontier Province, Pakistan. The bomber detonated his explosives in a mosque in the residential compound of Interior Minister Aftab Ahmad Khan Sherpao, where prayers for Eid al-Adha were being conducted. Sherpao was among the 1,000 people in the mosque at the time, but was not injured. The bomb contained around seven kilograms of explosive as well as nails and ball bearings.

Charsadda suffered major insurgent attacks in April 2007, February 2008, May 2011, January 2016 and February 2017, mainly carried out by internationally designated terrorist group Tehrik-i-Taliban Pakistan.

== See also ==
- Terrorist incidents in Pakistan in 2007
