= 2017 Lahore suicide bombing =

2017 Lahore suicide bombing may refer to these attacks in Lahore by the Tehrik-i-Taliban Pakistan:

- February 2017 Lahore suicide bombing
- April 2017 Lahore suicide bombing
- July 2017 Lahore suicide bombing

== See also ==
- Lahore bombing (disambiguation)
- 2017 Lahore explosion
