= 2010 Lahore bombings =

2010 Lahore bombing may refer to:

- March 2010 Lahore bombings
- 2010 Ahmadiyya mosques massacre
- July 2010 Lahore bombings
- September 2010 Lahore bombings

== See also ==
- Lahore bombing (disambiguation)
