= August 2017 Lahore bombing =

2017 Truck Bombing

- Part of Insurgency in Khyber Pakhtunkhwa
- Location: 31°32′9.74″N 74°16′34.87″E; Band Road, Lahore, Punjab, Pakistan
- Date: 7 August 2017; 21:00 (PKT)
- Attack type: Truck bombing
- Weapon: Explosive material
- Deaths: 2
- Injuries: 35
- No. of participants: 1
- Motive: Islamic extremism

On 7 August 2017, a truck bombing occurred at Band Road in Lahore, Punjab, Pakistan. Two people were killed and 35 others were wounded. Tehrik-i-Taliban Pakistan is suspected to have perpetrated the attack.

== Background ==
Lahore suffered several terrorist incidents in 2017. This attack came two weeks after a suicide bombing that claimed 26 lives, which followed a blast targeting a census team in April and a bombing that killed 13 people in February.

=== Intelligence before the attack ===
According to a news article published in Daily Dunya on 1 August, law enforcement agencies had diligently informed the Inspector General of the Punjab Police, Arif Nawaz, about the details and specific locations of the highly possible terror attacks.

The agencies passed on information that several facilitators and groups of banned outfits near fruit markets were actively transporting explosive materials, weapons, suicide jackets and timing devices via trucks and secretly occupying several buildings where they planned terror activities, the report stated.

Warning the police officials, the agencies said that the checkpoints near the fruit markets were insufficient to ensure safety and security. The agencies directed them to carry out intelligence-based and combing operations in and around the target areas so that those who want to carry out the attacks in Punjab cannot do so easily.

== Attack ==
At around 20:50 UTC+5:00, a truck loaded with fruit exploded, killing two and injuring 35 people. Injuries were caused by debris of the building that collapsed as a result of explosion. More than 100 vehicles near the explosion were also damaged. The roof of a nearby school collapsed. The explosion caused damage to an electrical transformer and consequently the electrical supply was suspended and the area of the explosion was darkened. People initially thought that the electrical transformer had exploded. The explosion left a 10-foot crater on the ground. Parts of the truck were found several hundred meters away from the explosion site.

== Aftermath ==
As the explosion occurred about 300 meters away from Rescue 1122's headquarters, Rescue 1122 teams began to take the injured to Mian Munshi Hospital and Moyo Hospital. Security officials cordoned off the area. The bomb disposal squad reached the site and discovered that 80 kilograms of explosive material was used.

Following the attack, the Counter Terrorism Department (CTD) teams began their search operation. A few hours after the attack, a clash erupted between 7 terrorists and the CTD team in which 4 terrorists were shot dead while 3 others managed to flee in the dark. The terrorists were identified as Tehreek-i-Taliban Pakistan's militants.

== Reactions ==
CM Punjab Shehbaz Sharif condemned the attack and directed the authorities to investigate it.

== See also ==
- Terrorist incidents in Lahore since 2000
