= Assassination of Ataullah Shah =

2017 shooting in Dera Ismail Khan, Pakistan

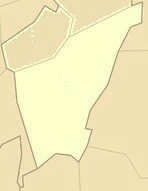
- Location: 31°50′6.34″N 70°54′46.71″E; Bannu Ada, Dera Ismail Khan, Khyber Pakhtunkhwa, Pakistan
- Date: 19 August 2017; Morning (PST)
- Target: Ataullah Shah
- Attack type: Shooting; targeted killing
- Weapon: Guns
- Deaths: 1 (Shah)
- Motive: Sectarian violence

On 19 August 2017, Attaullah Shah, a prominent worker of Jamiat Ulema-e-Islam (F), was shot dead by unknown assailants at Bannu Ada, Dera Ismail Khan, Khyber Pakhtunkhwa, Pakistan. No one claimed responsibility of the assault.

== Biography ==
Ataullah Shah originated from Paniyala and was living in Dera Ismail Khan for several years. He was a spiritual teacher and was serving as Khateeb (sermon-giver) of a local mosque. Shah was considered a member of Jamiat Ulema-e-Islam (F) and was aide of its chief Maulana Fazl-ur-Rehman.

== Background ==
=== JUI (F)'s members' execution ===
In May 2017, a suicide bombing targeting Abdul Ghafoor Haideri, a leader of JUI (F), left 25 people dead. However Haideri himself managed to escape. The current attack came weeks after Qari Haq Nawaz, leader of JUI (F), was shot dead by unknown assailants in Charsada.

=== Recent killings in the city ===
Dera Ismail Khan has been home to terrorism in the past. There had been many incidents of bombings. However, for the past half a decade, there had been no such incident in the city. The violence sparked again in August 2017. Two police constables were gunned down on August 11 near Kotli Imam Hussain Imambargah. Two days later, a government servant was shot dead at his doorstep in Maryali area. A milk-seller was critically injured due to firing in Eidgah on August 17.

== Shooting ==
Shah was walking to home after offering Fajr prayer. In the way, gunmen riding on a motorcycle opened fire, and killed him. The gunmen managed to flee. Local police chief Amjad Khan says, "Attaullah Shah was walking towards home after praying at a mosque in the city of Dera Ismail Khan, when the assailants opened fire early Saturday morning." As the news of his death spread, several workers of JUI (F) gathered at the hospital. No one claimed responsibility of attack. Security forces cordoned off the area and started a search operation. Shops and business centers remained closed as the fear spread. His funeral prayer was offered on the evening of the day he was killed. Shah's body was sent to his native town, Paniyala for burial.

== See also ==
- Terrorist incidents in Pakistan in 2017
