= Terrorist incidents in Lahore since 2000 =

This is a list of terrorist incidents in Lahore since 2000.

== Context ==
Terrorist incidents in major Pakistani cities, including Lahore, rose post the Afghanistan war, peaked between 2008 to 2015 and declined after 2015-2017 operations. The implementation of frameworks like the National action plan in 2015, helped to curb terrorism nationwide to a great extent. This incorporated large-scale military offensives like Zarb-ul-azb and Radd-ul-Fasaad that played a major part in dismantling militant networks and deterring such attacks. Terrorism across Pakistan fell in 2019, however, it rose sharply following the fall of Kabul. This caused a resurgence of terrorism in Pakistan, concentrated in the provinces of KPK and Balochistan, mostly away from major cites, like Lahore.

== Incidents by year ==
=== 2004 ===
	Date	Area	Type of Incident	Deaths	Injured People
1	10 October 2004	At the entrance of Jamia Masjid Kashmirian in Mochi Gate	Suicide Bombing	4 People	10

=== 2005 ===
	Date	Area	Type of Incident	Deaths	Injured People
2	22 September 2005	Near a food stall outside the Minar-e-Pakistan park	Time Bomb	1 Person	9
3	22 September 2005	Outside a Jewelry shop in Ichra	Time Bomb	5 People	18

=== 2006 ===
	Date	Area	Type of Incident	Deaths	Injured People
4	29 August 2006	Inside a dustbin between two cars in a Liberty Market	Remote Controlled Bomb	--	20
5	17 November 2006	Inside a small dustbin near a FC College stop # 2 on a Ferozepur Road	Remote Controlled Bomb	--	25

=== 2008 ===
	Date	Area	Type of Incident	Deaths	Injured People
6	10 January 2008	Outside the Lahore High Court	Suicide Bombing	22 Police Soldiers; 4 Civilians	73
7	4 March 2008	Inside a Naval War College	Suicide Bombing	Deputy Chief Officer Khalid; 2 FCS Soldiers; 1 Security Guard; 1 Sanitary Worker	15
8	11 March 2008	Inside a FIA Headquarters on Temple road	Suicide Bombing	16 FIA Soldiers; 10 People	175+
9	11 March 2008	Outside a Advertising Agency in a Model Town	Suicide Bombing	4 People	3
10	13 August 2008	Outside a Iqbal Town Police Station	Suicide Bombing	3 Police Soldiers; 5 Civilians	20
11	7 October 2008	Outside a Juice shop in Garhi Shahu	Remote Controlled Bomb	--	10
12	22 November 2008	Inside a Alhamra Art Cultural Complex	Remote Controlled Bomb	--	7
13	24 December 2008	Inside a mini truck at GOR-2	Remote Controlled Bomb	1 Woman	4

=== 2009 ===
	Date	Area	Type of Incident	Deaths	Injured People
14	9 January 2009	Outside a Theatre on Mall Road	Remote Controlled Bomb	--	5
15	3 March 2009	On Sri Lankan Cricket Team Bus at Liberty Chowk	Attacked	6 Policeman; 2 Civilians	24
16	30 March 2009	Manawan Police Training School	Attacked	6 Policeman; 1 Civilian	95+
17	27 May 2009	Outside Rescue 15 and Intelligence Office	Remote Controlled Bomb	Kernal Mirza Amir Baig; 2 Officers; 5 Soldiers; 20 Civilians	300+
18	12 June 2009	Inside a Jamia-e-Naeemia Mosque	Suicide Bombing	Mufti Sarfraz Naeemi; 6 People	12+
19	15 October 2009	FIA Headquarter, Manawan Police Training School and Elite Training School	Attacked	16 Policeman; 2 Civilians	50+
20	7 December 2009	Inside a Moon Market on Allama Iqbal Town	Suicide Bombing, Shooting	40 People	100+

=== 2010 ===
	Date	Area	Type of Incident	Deaths	Injured People
21	8 March 2010	Outside the office of Special Intelligence Agency in K-Block Model Town	Suicide Bombing	Inspector S.I.A; 7 Soldiers; 6 Civilians	100+
22	12 March 2010	At bus stop "R.A Bazar" in Lahore Cantt	Suicide Bombing	8 Army Soldiers; 49 Civilians	100+
23	12 March 2010	Near the Moon Market on Allama Iqbal Town	Remote Controlled Bomb	--	3
24	21 May 2010	Inside a Tibbi City Bazar	Remote Controlled Bomb	--	4
25	28 May 2010	Ahmaddiya Mosques Massacre	Suicide Bombing		
26	1 July 2010	Inside a Sufi shrine, Data Durbar Complex	Suicide Bombing	42	170+
27	1 September 2010	In Youm-e-Ali (a.s.) Procession	Suicide Bombing	29	200

=== 2011 ===
	Date	Area	Type of Incident	Deaths	Injured People
28	25 January 2011	In Urdu Bazar	Suicide Bombing	13	51
29	3 February 2011	Near Baba Haider Saeen Darbar	Remote Controlled Bomb	2	28

=== 2012 ===
	Date	Area	Type of Incident	Deaths	Injured People
30	24 April 2012	On Railway Station	Remote Controlled Bomb	2	58
31	1 August 2012	In a Badami Bagh Fruit Market	Remote Controlled Bomb	--	23

=== 2013 ===
	Date	Area	Type of Incident	Deaths	Injured People
32	6 July 2013	In a Food Street old Anarkali	Remote Controlled Bomb	5	50
33	10 October 2013	In a Food Street old Anarkali	Remote Controlled Bomb	1	16

=== 2015 ===
	Date	Area	Type of Incident	Deaths	Injured People
34	17 February 2015	On the main gate of Qila Gujjar Singh Police Lines on Empress Road	Suicide Bombing	2 Police Soldiers; 3 Civilians	31
35	15 March 2015	Youhanabad Churches	Suicide Bombing	15	70
36	29 May 2015	Near Gaddafi Stadium	Suicide Bombing	Sub-Inspector Abdul Majeed; 1 Civilian	6

=== 2016 ===
	Date	Area	Type of Incident	Deaths	Injured People
37	27 March 2016	On Gate # 1 near Children's play area in Gulshan-e-Iqbal Park	Suicide Bombing	78 (Mostly women and children)	350+
38	26 October 2016	Inside a Mochi Gate	Explosion	1 Person	10

=== 2017 ===
	Date	Area	Type of Incident	Deaths	Injured People
39	13 February 2017	At Chairing Cross outside the Punjab Assembly on Mall Road	Suicide Bombing	DIG Traffic Capt (r) Ahmad Mubeen; SSP Zahid Mahmood Gondal; ASI Ameen; Head Constable Asmat Ullah; 3 FC Soldiers; 7 Civilians	85
40	5 April 2017	On Census team in Bedian Road area	Suicide Bombing	4 Army soldiers 1 Air Force airman 1 Person	19
41	24 July 2017	In a vegetable market, on Ferozpur road	Suicide bombing	17 civilians 9 policemen	54
42	7 August 2017	At Band Road	Truck Bombing	2 civilians	35

=== 2018 ===
	Date	Area	Type of Incident	Deaths	Injured People
43	14 March 2018	At police checkpoint, on Raiwind road	Suicide Bombing	5 Policemen 8 civilians	20+

=== 2019 ===
	Date	Area	Type of Incident	Deaths	Injured People
44	8 May 2019	Outside Data Darbar Sufi shrine	Suicide Bombing	6 policemen 1 Security guard 6 civilians	24

=== 2021 ===
	Date	Area	Type of Incident	Deaths	Injured People
45	23 June 2021	Johar Town	Car Bombing	3 civilians	21

=== 2022 ===
	Date	Area	Type of Incident	Deaths	Injured People
46	20 January 2022	Johar Town	Improvised explosive device	3	48

=== 2026 ===
	Date	Area	Type of Incident	Deaths	Injured People
47	14 August 2026	Badami Bagh area	Targeted killing	2 policemen	0
