= 2017 Jhal Magsi suicide bombing =

Terrorist incident in Pakistan

- Map of Balochistan with Jhal Magsi district highlighted
- Location: Fatehpur, Jhal Magsi, Balochistan, Pakistan
- Date: 5 October 2017
- Target: Pir Rakhel Shah shrine
- Attack type: Suicide bombing; terrorist attack
- Weapon: explosive vest
- Deaths: 20+
- Injuries: 30+

On 5 October 2017, a suicide bomber targeted the shrine of Pir Rakhel Shah situated in Fatehpur, a small town in Gandawah tehsil of Jhal Magsi district in Pakistan's southwestern Balochistan province. At least 20 people, including two policemen, were killed and more than 30 others injured in the suicide attack.

== Background ==
The shrine was previously targeted by terrorists more than a decade ago on 19 March 2005. At least 35 people were killed, including both Shia and Sunni devotees, and several injured when a suicide bomber targeted the shrine of Pir Rakhel Shah in 2005.

It was the second deadliest attack on a shrine in Pakistan in 2017. Previously in February 2017, Islamic State of Iraq and the Levant (ISIL) claimed responsibility for a suicide bombing in Sehwan that targeted the shrine of Lal Shahbaz Qalandar, killing at least 90 people.

== Bombing ==
In the evening of 5 October 2017, a suicide bomber targeted the Sufi shrine of Pir Rakhel Shah situated in Fatehpur, a small town in Gandawah tehsil of Jhal Magsi district in Pakistan's southwestern Balochistan province. Balochistan government spokesperson, Anwar ul Haq Kakar confirmed that the blast was a suicide attack.

According to Balochistan's Home Secretary Akbar Harifal, a suicide bomber blew himself up at the entrance, after he was intercepted by on-duty police guards outside the shrine. According to him, 18 people including three children and two policemen were killed; and at least 27 others injured, fourteen of them seriously. Balochistan's Home Minister Sarfraz Bugti also confirmed the death toll. Deputy Commissioner Asadullah Kakar said that, the attack took place "at a time when it was packed with people, attending anniversary celebrations of Syed Cheesal Shah". In terms of attendance, thursdays are usually busy at shrines as the day is considered spiritually significant. The explosion took place when the dhamaal was being performed after Isha prayers.

According to Reuters, militant group ISIL claimed responsibility for the attack via its Amaq News Agency.

== Response ==
The security forces reached at the scene after the incident and cordoned-off the area. The provincial health minister Rehmat Saleh Baloch declared a state of emergency at hospitals in Dera Murad Jamali, Sibi and Dera Allah Yar. A heavy contingent of security forces initiated a search operation in the area. The forensic experts collected evidence from the blast site. SSP Jhal Magsi Muhammad Iqbal revealed that ball bearing and legs of the suicide bomber were recovered from the site.

The injured were transferred to District Headquarters Hospital Gandawah, of which eighteen were shifted to Quetta and Larkana for medical treatment. Harifal added that the critically injured patients from the blast were being airlifted to Sindh province in the absence of adequate medical facilities in Balochistan. Dr Rukhsana Magsi, the medical superintendent of the DHQ hospital said that twelve injured have been shifted to hospitals in Sindh's Larkana, Shahdadkot and Jacobabad for treatment of their life-threatening injuries.

== Reaction ==
President of Pakistan Mamnoon Hussain condemned the terrorist attack while expressing grief and sorrow over the loss of lives. The President further added that the whole nation is united in the fight against terrorism and such acts cannot shake Pakistan's resolve against this menace.

Prime Minister of Pakistan Shahid Khaqan Abbasi condemned the terrorist attack and said that, "terrorists have no religion". He added that the government "will not allow them [terrorists] to disturb our [Pakistan's] peace and values; they will be dealt with the full might of the state".

Speaker of the National Assembly Sardar Ayaz Sadiq in a tweet sent prayers for the families and victims of the Jhal Magsi blast. He added that the "perpetrators behind such barbaric acts are heartless towards humanity".

Balochistan Home Minister Bugti said that Pakistan shares "a porous border with Afghanistan. Keeping all these factors in mind, our security forces ensured a peaceful Muharram and they will continue to fight terrorism in Balochistan."

=== International ===
- United States: The State Department spokesperson Heather Nauert, offered condolences to the victims and their families, and wished a speedy recovery to those injured. She added that the US stands "with the people of Pakistan and the broader South Asia region in their fight against terrorism".
