= Sehwan suicide bombing =

2017 suicide bombing in Pakistan

2017 Sehwan suicide bombing
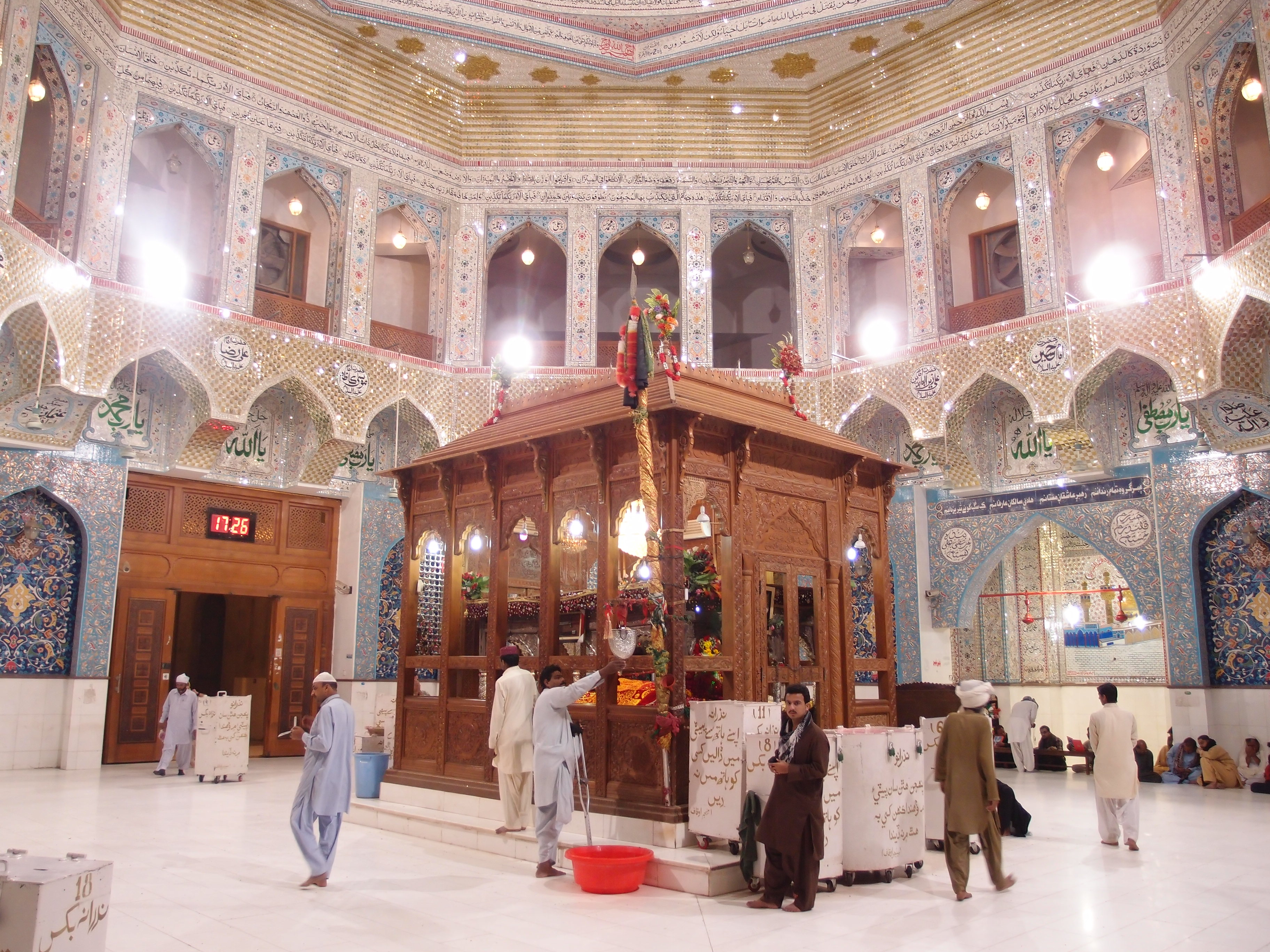
- An interior view of Lal Shahbaz Qalandar's shrine in 2014

- Sehwan (Sindh) Sehwan (Pakistan)
- Location: Sehwan Sharif, Sindh, Pakistan
- Date: 16 February 2017
- Target: Sufi pilgrims
- Attack type: Suicide bombing, terrorist attack
- Weapons: Suicide jacket, grenade
- Deaths: 91 (+1 bomber)
- Injuries: 300+
- Perpetrator: Islamic State of Iraq and the Levant – Khorasan Province
- Assailant: 1 suicide bomber

On 16 February 2017, a suicide bombing took place inside the Shrine of Lal Shahbaz Qalandar in Sehwan, Sindh, Pakistan, where pilgrims were performing a Sufi ritual after the evening prayers. At least 90 people were killed and over 300 injured.

The Islamic State of Iraq and the Levant – Khorasan Province claimed responsibility for the bombing. Services at the shrine were resumed the next day in an act of defiance against terrorists, while leading Pakistani performers partook in the traditional Sufi whirling dance at the shrine a few days later as a protest against the radical Islamist perpetrators.

The attack followed a series of terrorist incidents earlier in the month, including a suicide attack in Lahore. Pakistani authorities alleged that the attacks were orchestrated by jihadists in Afghanistan.

== Bombing ==
The suicide bomber struck the pilgrims during a dhamaal (ritual dance) after the evening prayers. The bomber threw a grenade which failed to explode. Then he blew himself up inside the shrine hall under the dome, near its Golden Gate. The bomber, believed to be an Afghan national, had bypassed the security check at the shrine.

At least 21 children were believed to be among the dead. The bomber used a suicide jacket, with the ball bearings in the jacket acting as shrapnel and causing casualties.

== Planning and execution ==
Suicide bombing was jointly planned in Dera Murad Jamali Balochistan by a cell affiliated with the Islamic State of Iraq and the Levant (ISIL). According to the Sindh Counter-Terrorism Department (CTD) and Joint Investigation Team (JIT) reports the operation was conceived by Ghulam Mustafa Mazari (alias Doctor/Shah Jee) a relative of Moulana Abdul Aziz of lal Masjid who served as the 'Ameer' of ISIL activities in Sindh Balochistan and Punjab. The group utilized the encrypted messaging app Threema to coordinate logistics. a facilitator Nadir Ali Jakhrani, was tasked with leading the operation due to his familiarity with Sehwan Sharif. Nadir Ali Jakhrani alongside accomplice Saifullah Mazari transported the suicide bomber identified as Babar (or Barar) Brohi from Mastung to Sehwan via public transport. The attackers rented a nearby room and conducted reconnaissance of Sufi mausoleum specifically targeting the dhamaal ritual courtyard. Taking advantage of a scheduled electricity blackout at 6:30 p.m on 16 February, Nadir Ali Jakhrani and Saifullah Mazari escorted the bomber into the shrine before escaping to a getaway vehicle driven by Ghulam Mustafa Mazari at Jahaz Chowk. Following the explosion the perpetrators were said to have fled to Rojhan Mazari Punjab.

== Masterminds and arrests ==
Ghulam Mustafa Mazari identified as the primary mastermind of the attack was later killed in a targeted military operation by security forces in Mastung Balochistan.

On 15 November 2017, the primary facilitator Nadir Ali Jakhrani (alias Murshid) was arrested in the Manghopir area of Karachi during a joint raid by the CTD and Pakistan Rangers. Authorities recovered explosives, a suicide vest circuit and firearms, noting that Nadir Ali Jakhrani was en route to Karachi to execute another attack. Following his confession before a judicial magistrate the Sindh government transferred his trial to a military court. His accomplice Safiullah Sodwani Mazari has said to fled afghanistan after hearing the arrest of Nadir Ali Jakhrani.

== Aftermath ==
The injured and deceased were immediately shifted to the Taluka Medical Hospital which was not equipped with a trauma centre to deal with emergency cases. The medical facilities in Sehwan were basic, and some of the injured were in critical condition. A state of emergency was declared for all hospitals in the neighbouring areas. Pakistan Navy helicopters and a Pakistan Air Force C-130 were dispatched for rescue operations.

Hours after the attack, law enforcement agencies launched a nationwide crackdown and search operation, during which over 100 militants were killed and scores arrested. Several insurgents were confronted in Sindh and Khyber Pakhtunkhwa. Weapons, including hand grenades, were recovered from their hideouts. Police arrested a suspected facilitator in connection to the Sehwan attack from Johi, a town in Sindh's Dadu District. On 22 February 2017, a few days after attack, Pakistan Military launched Operation Radd-ul-Fasaad to eliminate terrorism.

=== Resumption of daily services ===
The next morning, the shrine's caretaker continued the daily tradition of ringing the shrine's bell at 3:30 am, and said that he would not be intimidated by terrorists. The shrine's dhamaal, or meditative dancing ceremony, resumed the evening following the attack. A few days later, several leading Pakistani artists and performers partook in a dhamaal at the shrine as a defiant response to radical Islamists.

== Reactions ==
=== Domestic ===
Prime Minister Nawaz Sharif condemned the blast, and said that "an attack on the shrine of Lal Shahbaz Qalandar is an attack on the progressive and inclusive future of Pakistan." A statement released by the military's Inter-Services Public Relations (ISPR) stated that the army chief, General Qamar Javed Bajwa, had ordered that immediate assistance be provided to civil authorities. Bajwa said "Each drop of the nation's blood shall be revenged, and revenged immediately. No more restraint for anyone."

The Governor of Sindh, Mohammad Zubair, condemned the blast and said "Sindh is a land of the Sufis. The terrorists have targeted the devotees to achieve their nefarious designs." The Government of Sindh announced three days of mourning in Sindh, while the governments of Khyber Pakhtunkhwa and Balochistan also announced a day of mourning in their respective provinces.

==== Strikes on Afghan camps ====
ISPR spokesman, Major General Asif Ghafoor, tweeted: "Recent terrorist acts are being executed on directions from hostile powers and from sanctuaries in Afghanistan. We shall defend and respond". A few hours after the incident, the Pakistan-Afghanistan border was sealed indefinitely for security reasons. On 17 February, the Pakistan Army summoned Afghan embassy officials to the General Headquarters and handed over a list of 76 insurgents hiding in Afghanistan. The army demanded that Kabul take "immediate action" or have them "handed over to Pakistan". The same day, army chief Qamar Javed Bajwa made a telephone call to the general commander of U.S. forces in Afghanistan, John W. Nicholson, and expressed concern over such incidents in Pakistan linked to safe havens in Afghanistan. Bajwa stated "Such terrorist activities and inaction against them are testing our current policy of cross border restraint" and urged Nicholson for cooperation in dismantling the militant networks, in addition to briefing him about the list of wanted terrorists. Later, Pakistani security forces destroyed a dozen Jamaat-ul-Ahrar camps across the border in eastern Afghanistan, and killed over a dozen militants including a top trainer of suicide bombers. The strikes were confirmed by Afghan sources, who said that several Pakistani artillery rounds had hit Nangarhar Province's Lal Pur District and that "15 to 20 terrorists, among them Commander Rehman Baba, have been killed and many more injured." The Afghan foreign ministry also protested the shelling by Pakistan on its territory.

=== International ===
- Afghanistan: President Ashraf Ghani condemned the attack, stating that "terrorists once again, proved that they have no respect for Islamic values". Chief Executive Abdullah Abdullah also condemned the attack and offered sympathy to the families of victims and people of Pakistan.
- Belarus: Ambassador Andrei Ermolovich condemned the Sehwan blast while expressing solidarity with Pakistan. He also said that Belarus stands with Pakistan in its efforts for elimination of terrorism.
- China: President Xi Jinping condemned the attack and offered sympathy to the Pakistani people. He said that China "will stand ready to firmly support Pakistan in its effort to fight terrorism, maintain national stability and safeguard its people". Chinese Premier Li Keqiang also expressed shock and condemned the attack.
- India: The Indian external affairs ministry strongly condemned the attack on the Lal Qalandar shrine at Sehwan and offered their sympathies to Pakistani people.
- Japan: A statement issued by the Ministry of Foreign Affairs said that "Japan is shocked and saddened by the suicide attack".
- Kyrgyzstan: President Almazbek Atambayev expressed sorrow and offered condolences over the terrorist attack.
- Russia: President Vladimir Putin expressed condolences over the incident, while reaffirming Russia's "readiness to further step up counter-terrorist cooperation" with Pakistan.
- Tajikistan: President Emomali Rahmon offered condolence adding that the Tajik people "are deeply saddened by the tragic news".
- United States: Acting State Department deputy spokesman Mark Toner said the U.S. condemned the suicide bombing and offered its "support to the Pakistani government as it works to bring the perpetrators of this crime to justice". He added: "We stand with the people of Pakistan in their fight against terrorism and remain committed to the security of the South Asia region."

== See also ==
- List of terrorist incidents linked to Islamic State – Khorasan Province
- Sufism in Pakistan
- Terrorist incidents in Pakistan in 2017
