= Terrorist incidents in Pakistan in 2017 =

Terrorist incidents in Pakistan in 2017 include, in chronological order:

== January ==
- 4 January an explosion took place on Bannu Road in Dera Ismail Khan. The police van was on routine patrolling when it was targeted by remote control bomb that was planted in the center of the road. According to police the bomb weighed between 5 and 7 kilograms. In the attack, 15 people including five police officers and a woman were injured. The injured police officers include constable Atta-ur-Rehman, BaqarMukhtarHussain, Asif and Akram while among other injures was the security guard of Gomal University, Muhammad Ali who was referred to Multan for medical treatment.
- 21 January - a bomb was detonated at a vegetable market in Parachinar, in the Kurram Valley of the Federally Administered Tribal Areas of Pakistan. At least 25 people were killed and 87 injured by the explosion. Parachinar is the administrative headquarters of the Kurram Agency near the Afghan border. The same area has previously seen several blasts, including: the 2008 Parachinar bombing; February 2012; September 2012; the 2013 Parachinar bombing; and the 2015 Parachinar bombing. Chief of Army Staff (COAS) General Qamar Bajwa visited Parachinar and paid a visit to the injured of the bomb blast in Agency Headquarters Hospital. Lashkar-e-Jhangvi al-Alami and the Pakistani Taliban splinter Shehryar Mehsud group both separately issued a joint claim of responsibility. Seven suspects were arrested following a search operation after the blast.

== February ==
- 12 February - Samaa TV assistant cameraman Taimoor Khan killed in an incident. Tehreek-e-Taliban Pakistan claimed the responsibility.
- 13 February - A blast outside the provincial assembly in Lahore killed at least 14 people including DIG Police and SSP Operations and injured more than 87 others.
- 15 February - Five people, including three Levies personnel, killed in a suicide attack in Mohmand Agency.
- 15 February - A suicide bomber targeted a government van carrying civil judges in Hayatabad. There were two fatalities (plus the terrorist) and 12 people injured.
- 16 February - Three soldiers killed, including an army captain, two injured in an IED explosion in Awaran.
- 16 February - At least 90 people were killed (plus the terrorist) and over 340 injured when a suicide bomber blew himself up in the Shrine of Lal Shahbaz Qalandar in Sehwan, 125 kilometers north of Jamshoro.
- 17 February Five people, including four police officers, were killed after unidentified suspects opened fire on police van near Mission Mor, Dera Ismail Khan.
- 21 February Three suicide bombers targeted a sessions court in Tangi, Charsadda District, Khyber Pakhtunkhwa, killing seven people and injuring more than 20 others.

== March ==
- 6 March - Six soldiers of Pakistan army and 10 militants were killed in a series of cross border attacks at three border checkpoints in Mohmand Agency.
- 31 March - At least 24 people were killed and more than 70 injured in a blast outside a Shia Imambargah in Parachinar.

== April ==
- 5 April - a suicide bomber killed at least eight people and wounded 24 near a Pakistan Army vehicle taking part in the census in the city of Lahore, Pakistan. The injured were shifted to the Combined Military Hospital (CMH) and General Hospital. Tehreek-i-Taliban Pakistan claimed responsibility, saying it was carried out in revenge against security personnel. On the 8th of April, Pakistani police killed 10 Taliban gunmen in a gun battle in Lahore.
- 7 April - Ashfaq Ahmed, a retired University of Veterinary Sciences professor and Ahmadi civilian, were shot death for assailants in Sabzazar neighborhood, Lahore, Pakistan. Al-Alami faction of Lashkar-e-Jhangvi and the Jamaat-ul-Ahrar faction of Tehrik-i-Taliban Pakistan (TTP) separately claimed responsibility for the attack, but sources also attributed the incident to Aalmi Majlis-i-Tahfuz-i-Khatam-i-Nubuwaat. In 21 May, four assailants from Aalmi Majlis-i-Tahfuz-i-Khatam-i-Nubuwaat were held in relation of the attack.
- 14 April - 4 Rangers personnel killed and 3 were injured and Rangers kill 10 TTP militants in operation near DG khan.
- 25 April - 14, including six children, killed and 9, including 4 Khasadar officials, injured in a roadside blast in Kurram Agency.

== May ==
- 8 May Two bombs exploded in Peshawar while the third one was defused by Bomb Disposal Squad. Three officials of Counter Terrorism Department (CTD) were injured. At around 4:50 am, an IED went off outside a girls primary school in Urmar area on Shamshato Road. The school gate was damaged as the bomb detonated. According to police, two IEDs were found installed outside the school, out of which one exploded while the other was defused by the Bomb Disposal Squad. The defused bomb contained 2–2.25 kg of material. The CTD team was on their way back after inspecting the site when their vehicle was detonated near Khotko Bridge. At the spot, three officials were injured who were identified as Akbar Ali, Israr and Nizar. A passerby named Wali-ur-Rahman was also injured as the bomb exploded.
- 12 May - An attack targeting Abdul Ghafoor Haideri killed 25 people in Mastung District. Islamic State of Iraq and the Levant claimed responsibility of attack.
- 13 May - 10 laborers were killed after two gunmen opened fire on laborers working in Gwadar. The two gunmen fired on labourers at Pishgan and Gant, which are 20 kilometres from each other. Eight labourers died on the spot; two died shortly afterwards. According to an eyewitness, both gunmen came from the Pashkun area and they spoke in Balochi. A C-130 aircraft belonging to the Pakistan Air Force was used to fly the labourers to their native areas after the funeral, which was held in Senator Marwoon Ishaq Cricket ground at around 3 pm. Law enforcement agencies rushed to the site of the attack and started a search operation.

== June ==
- 23 June - 14 people ─ including seven policeman ─ lost their lives, while 19 others were injured in a suicide blast that shook Shuhada Chowk in Quetta's Gulistan Road area on Friday morning.
- 23 June- At least 75 people were killed and more than 150 wounded when twin blasts tore through a market in Parachinar. Lashkar-i-Jhangvi al-Alami claimed the responsibility.

== July ==
- 10 July - 4 people were killed and over 20 injured when a suicide bomber blew himself up at Bogra Chowk in Chaman, Baluchistan. The deceased were two police officers, the bomber and a passerby. According to police sources, a suicide bomber on a motorcycle rode into District Police Officer of Killa Abdullah, Sajid Khan Mohammad's vehicle killing both of them, his guard and a passerby as well as wounding 20 others. At the time of the explosion, the DPO was at Bogra Chowk. The head and legs of the bomber were found. Initial reports suggested that the explosion was caused by an improvised explosive device; police sources later said that a suicide bomber blew himself up. Reports also stated that gunfire was heard after the explosion. Assistant Commissioner of Chaman Kashif confirmed the attack. Using a helicopter, the bodies of the injured were brought to hospitals where an emergency had been declared.
- 24 July- At least 25 people were killed and 53 others wounded in suicide attack in Lahore.

== August ==
- 7 August - August 2017 Lahore bombing a truck bombing occurred at Band Road in Lahore, Punjab, Pakistan. Two people were killed and 35 others were wounded.
- 12 August - A blast targeting military personnel killed 15 people (8 soldiers and 7 civilians) and injured 32 in Quetta, the provincial capital of Balochistan, Pakistan.

== October ==
- 5 October - 21 people, including a police constable, were killed and more than 30 injured in a suicide bombing at Dargah Pir Rakhel Shah in Fatehpur, a small town in the Jhal Magsi District of Balochistan.
- 18 October - At least eight people, including seven policemen, were killed and 24 others injured in an explosion targeting a truck carrying police officials in the Sariab Mill area of Quetta.

== November ==
- 9 November - A senior police officer was among three suspected militants involved in ISI Clandestine activities who died in a suicide attack on Quetta the provincial capital of Balochistan. However there is no valid argument about the role of operation being performed.
- 24 November - A motorcycle suicide bomber targeted a police vehicle of AIG Asharf Noor while he was travelling to work. Noorr and his guard were killed, as well as the bomber, and eight other police in the AIG's squad were injured.

== December ==
- 1 December - Nine dead as gunmen storm hostel of Agricultural Training Institute, Peshawar.
- 17 December - A bomb killed nine and injured fifty-seven at a Methodist church in Balochistan. The Islamic State of Iraq and the Levant took responsibility.

== See also ==
- 2017 in Pakistan
- Terrorism in Pakistan
- List of terrorist incidents, 2017
