= Rakhyal Shah =

Balochi poet (1842–1940)

Rakhyal Shah (1842–1940) was a Sindhi Sufi poet from Fateh Pur Sharif, most famous for his multivolume book of Sufi poetry Bahar al-`ishq. The poet himself grew to be the head of a cult, and after his death in 1940, a dargah (shrine) was built in Fateh Pur Sharif to honour him. His shrine was the target of suicide bombings in 2005 and in 2017.
