= Operation Ghazi =

2017 military offensive by the Pakistani Taliban

- Part of the Insurgency in Khyber Pakhtunkhwa and the war on terror
Date	13 February 2017 – 30 September 2017
Location	Throughout Pakistan
Result	Decisive Pakistani Victory

Belligerents
Pakistani Taliban; Lashkar-e-Jhangvi; Jamaat-ul-Ahrar	Islamic Republic of Pakistan; United States

Commanders and leaders
Mullah Fazlullah; Omar Khalid Khorasani	Mamnoon Hussain; Nawaz Sharif; Zubair Mahmood Hayat; Qamar Javed Bajwa; Naveed Mukhtar; Sohail Aman; Muhammad Zakaullah

Units involved
Pakistani Taliban; Jamaat-ul-Ahrar; Lashkar-e-Jhangvi	Pakistan Armed Forces; Pakistan Army; Pakistan Air Force; Pakistan Navy; Civil Armed Forces; Pakistan Rangers; Pakistan Police; United States; CIA drone strikes

Casualties and losses
100+ militants killed	16 police officers killed,18+ injured

Operation Ghazi was a joint military offensive by the Pakistani Taliban and allied militant groups including Jamaat-ul-Ahrar and Lashkar-e-Jhangvi.

The offensive began with a suicide bombing at the Mall in Lahore in which 12 civilians and six police officers were killed.

== Announcement ==
Jamaat-ul-Ahrar In the video, stated that its future targets would be legislative bodies Pakistan Army, intelligence agencies and supporting institutions; interest-based economic institutions; INGOs/NGOs and civil society organizations involved in the advocacy of human rights, women's rights and community awareness campaigns; liberal writers, political leaders and workers; media persons; and coeducational private schools, colleges and universities.

== Operation Radd ul Fasaad ==
On 22 February 2017, in response to the Operation Ghazi, Pakistan Army launched Operation Radd-ul-Fasaad (lit. "Elimination of Discord") across the country.

The operation aimed at indiscriminately eliminating residual threat of terrorism and consolidating gains of operations made so far. It further aimed at ensuring security of the borders. The countrywide de-westernization and explosive control were laid as the additional objectives of the operation.

== Timeline ==
=== 2017 ===
==== February 2017 ====
- On 13 February 2017, a suicide bombing took place on the Mall in Lahore, where a group of chemists and pharmaceutical personnel were demonstrating at the Charing Cross.
- The same day, 2 officers of the Bomb Disposal Squad (BDS) were killed and 12 others were injured, when a bomb BDS personnel were trying to defuse went off. The bomb was placed near Karachi Stop on Saryab road, Quetta.
- On 15 February 2017, two attacks occurred in Ghalanai and Peshawar. In the first attack in Ghalanai, a suicide bomber killed three policemen and two civilians near an administrative building in the Federally Administered Tribal Areas. An accomplice was shot and killed. A second suicide bomber failed to cause any casualties when his suicide vest detonated prematurely.

In the Peshawar bombing, a vehicle carrying local judges and government officials was targeted by suicide bombers. The driver and a civilian were killed and five others were injured.

- On 16 February, the Punjab Police's Counter Terrorism Department raided a Jamaat-ul-Ahrar hideout in Multan and killed 6 militants, who had resisted the operation with firing and explosives.
- On 21 February 2017, suicide bombers targeted a sessions court in Tangi, Charsadda District. Seven persons were killed and 21 were injured.

==== March 2017 ====
- On 5 March 2017, Pakistani military confirmed that 10 militants were killed and five soldiers lost their lives in attacks that took place in Mohmand Agency.
- On 17 March 2017, al-Jazeera reported that Jamaat-ur-Ahrar militants attacked a Pakistani military border post in Khyber Pakhtunkhwa from Afghanistan, killing two Pakistani soldiers. Six militants were also killed. Also that day a military operation in Rajgal Valley killed "several" LeI fighters, according to the Pakistani military media wing. Pakistan's military said it had foiled an attempted suicide attack on a paramilitary training centre in Shabqadar, in the northwestern Khyber Pakhtunkhwa province, two suicide bombers and a soldier were killed in the attempted attack, while another soldier was wounded.
- On 31 March 2017, at least 22 people have been killed and more than 70 injured in a blast outside a mosque in north-west Pakistan. Jamaat-ul-Ahrar claimed responsibility for the attack.
