= September 2010 Lahore bombings =

Series of bombings in Lahore, Pakistan

- The location of Lahore in Pakistan.
- Location: Lahore, Punjab, Pakistan
- Date: 1 September 2010
- Attack type: Suicide bombings
- Weapon: suicide belts
- Deaths: 38
- Injuries: 250
- Perpetrators: Lashkar-e-Jhangvi; Tehreek-e-Taliban Pakistan
- Motive: Anti-Shi'ism

The September 2010 Lahore bombings were a series of three suicide bombings which occurred on 1 September 2010, in Lahore, Pakistan. Thirty-eight people were killed and more than 250 injured in the three bombings that targeted a Shia procession.

== Background ==
Pakistan which has a mostly Sunni population has seen sectarian attacks against minorities including Shias who account for about 20% of Pakistan's population. It is estimated that 4000 people have been killed in religious violence over the last decade. This was the third attack against Lahore's minority communities in 2010: in May two mosques were attacked belonging to the Ahmadiyya Muslim Community, and in July the Sufi community came under attack. While the government of Pakistan has banned several militant groups many of them have re emerged under different names and critics say that governments reluctance to act against them is encouraging them.

These were the first major attacks in Pakistan since the country was devastated by 2010 Pakistan floods.

== Attacks ==
The blasts targeted a procession by about 35,000 Shia to mark the death anniversary of Ali whom they consider to be their first Imam. The three blasts occurred within 2,000 feet (610 m) of each other. The first explosion happened in the Karbala Gamay Shah area at 6:50 pm local time. This was followed by a second explosion about 25 minutes later in Bhati chowk. The third blast happened in Anarkali Bazaar about 10 minutes after the second explosion. Bodies of three suicide bombers have been recovered according to government sources. Two days later the death toll rose to 38.

=== Responsibility ===
Lashkar-e-Jhangvi claimed responsibility for the bombings.

== Aftermath ==
After the blasts angry mobs attacked police stations and burnt vehicles leading to deployment of Pakistan Rangers to maintain law and order. After the attack the authorities urged people not to hold outdoor religious meetings.

== Reaction ==
Three days of mourning was ordered by the provincial government and all private and public institutions were closed. The attacks were condemned by Prime Minister Yousaf Raza Gillani who vowed to bring the perpetrators to justice. The Chief Minister of Punjab Shahbaz Sharif announced compensation of Rs 500,000 for those killed and Rs 75,000 for the injured.

Following another attack in Quetta 2 days later, Interior Minister Rehman Malik told the press that militants want to fan the flames of sectarianism in an effort to destabilise the government followinga series of military offensives against them. He also claimed that Punjabi, such as Lashkar-e-Jhangvi, and al-Qaida and the Tehrik-e-Taliban are one and the same.

== See also ==
- Sectarian violence in Pakistan
- List of terrorist incidents in Pakistan since 2001
- Persecution of Shia Muslims
