= 2008 Lahore suicide bombings =

Terrorist incident in Pakistan

- Part of War in North-West Pakistan
- Location: Lahore, Pakistan
- Date: 11 March 2008
- Attack type: Suicide bombing
- Weapon: Bomb
- Deaths: 28
- Injuries: 350 (including 40 children)

The 2008 Lahore bombings were twin suicide car bombings which killed at least 28 people and wounded more 350 people in Lahore, Pakistan on March 11 2008. The first bomb targeted the FIA building around 9.30am when employees were arriving for work and the second smaller blast targeted an advertising agency in a residential area. The injured also included around 40 schoolchildren after windows were smashed due to the force of the explosion. The blasts were the escalation of militant campaign against government targets.

== See also ==
- Terrorist incidents in Lahore since 2000
