= 2017 Lahore explosion =

- Date: 23 February 2017
- Location: Defence, Lahore, Punjab, Pakistan; 31°28′25.4″N 74°22′38.6″E
- Deaths: 10
- Injuries: 31+

An explosion took place at around 10am on 23 February 2017 in a commercial market in Y-block of Defence, Lahore, Punjab, Pakistan, killing 10 people.

== Events ==
The blast ripped through a building that was under construction at a commercial market in the affluent Defence area, replete with upmarket boutiques and cafes as well as an academy for the international hair salon Toni & Guy. At least 10 people were killed and dozens more injured. The explosion happened a day after the Operation Radd-ul-Fasaad was launched, and was initially regarded as a terror attack.

However, authorities later ruled out terrorism and said the explosion was caused by a gas leak from a cooking cylinder. Punjab's Law Minister Rana Sanaullah blamed the confusion and chaos following the incident for the perception that it was a terrorist attack.

The government's account of the nature of the incident was met with skepticism by others. Pakistani-American martial artist Bashir Ahmad, who narrowly escaped the explosion, said: "My driver told me it was a transformer blast but because of my military experience I knew that the vibration in the area was that of a bomb." A former U.S. Army medic who served in the Iraq War, Ahmad added: "There was just so much damage, nothing but a bomb could’ve caused such destruction."

Alferno Café, situated in the basement of the building hit by the explosion, was damaged as a result. According to a worker at the cafe, the owner had bought five 45 kg gas cylinders a few days earlier, four of which were placed in the basement. Some workers had complained of a foul smell, which may have suggested leakage occurring. The worker added "My brother, Asif, lit a matchstick to smoke a cigarette which could have possibly triggered the explosion". He was killed in the explosion.
