= March 2010 Lahore bombings =

Bombing attacks in Pakistan

- Location: Lahore, Pakistan
- Date: 12 March 2010; 0810 8 March – 1300 12 March (UTC+5)
- Deaths: 72+
- Injuries: 190+

The March 2010 Lahore bombings were three separate, but related, bomb attacks in the Pakistani city of Lahore on 8 and 12 March 2010. Lahore, with a population of six million, is Pakistan's second largest city, and the capital of the Punjab province. After several attacks in Lahore in 2009, these were the first major incidents in the city in 2010. The 12 March bombings are the deadliest attacks in Pakistan to date in 2010.

== 8 March ==
The 8 March 2010 Lahore bombing was a suicide bombing in Lahore, Pakistan that killed 13 people and injured 90.

Around 0810 PKT, an individual drove a vehicle carrying a large amount of explosives into the Federal Investigation Agency's office in the Model Town district of Lahore. The building collapsed due to the damage it sustained. The bomb was 1,100 pounds (500 kg) in size, powerful enough to create a crater 12 feet (3.7 m) deep, and injure someone in a house 300 m away from the detonation.

The building had previously been attacked on 15 October 2009, in an incident that killed four people.

=== Reaction ===
Pakistani officials have reportedly blamed al-Qaeda and the Taliban for the incident. Rehman Malik, Pakistan's Interior Minister, said that while more attacks by the Taliban were expected, they were "desperate measures by a desperate organization".

Punjab Chief Minister Shahbaz Sharif condemned the attacks and said the victims would be compensated.

A spokesperson for the Taliban in Pakistan claimed the attack was retribution for recent attacks by the Pakistani military and the United States Central Intelligence Agency on tribal areas; and said "We have 2,800 to 3,000 more suicide bombers ... We will target all government places, buildings and offices," More specifically they said it was to avenge the death of Qari Zafar.

India denied involvement in the attacks, following allegations by several Pakistani media sources. “We categorically reject, once again, the allegations of India's involvement in such acts or activities. The government has reiterated, on several occasions and at the highest level, that India has no interest in destabilizing Pakistan,” the Indian Ministry of External Affairs said in a statement. The ministry said it was unfortunate that by repeating such unfounded and unsubstantiated allegations, officials in responsible positions in the government of Pakistan put a strain on the bilateral relationship, instead of concentrating on dismantling the infrastructure of terrorism directed against India and adversely impacting Pakistan itself

United States Secretary of State, Hillary Clinton, strongly condemned the blast and expressed sympathy to victims stating that "The coordinated multiple attacks in Lahore demonstrate the suffering that violent extremist elements are willing to inflict on the people of Pakistan – people who only wish to go about their daily lives in peace."

== 12 March ==
The 12 March 2010 Lahore bombings were a series of bombings in Lahore. It was the second attack in Lahore that week, following a bomb explosion at an intelligence headquarters on 8 March 2010.

Two men on foot and wearing vests carrying explosives detonated bombs near the Royal Artillery Bazaar. One man detonated his vest first, followed by the other ten to fifteen seconds later. It was speculated that the intended target was a military convoy in the area at the time. The blasts wounded about 100 people, mostly civilians, and killed at least 59, of which ten were soldiers. Local Police officials have said that the death toll is likely to rise. Following the bombings, military reinforcements took control of the area, preventing even news media from entering.

In the late afternoon, five more bombs were detonated in an Iqbal Town market, but their main consequence was panic. Some windows were broken, and a car was damaged, and three injuries were reported.

Tehrik-i-Taliban Pakistan, the same group responsible for the 8 March bombing, has claimed responsibility for these attacks, as well. Lashkar-e-Jhangvi has also claimed responsibility for the 12 March attack.

== Seizure of material ==
On 15 March 2010, police seized 3,000 pounds (1,400 kg) of explosives in a raid on an empty shop in Lahore. Also seized were grenades, suicide bomb vests and ammunition. The shop owner was arrested.

== See also ==
- List of terrorist incidents, 2010
- List of terrorist incidents in Pakistan since 2001
- 2009 Lahore police academy attacks
- 2009 Lahore bombing
- December 2009 Lahore attacks
