= 2021 Lahore bombing =

Attack in Johar Town, Punjab, Pakistan

- Date: 23 June 2021
- Time: 11 AM (UTC+05:00)
- Location: Johar Town, Lahore, Punjab, Pakistan
- Target: Hafiz Saeed's residence
- Deaths: 3
- Injuries: 17 to 24
- Arrests: Peter Paul David

On 23 June 2021, a car bomb exploded in Lahore, Punjab, Pakistan, killing three people.

== Bombing ==
On 23 June 2021, about 11 am local time, a car bombing took place in Johar Town, Lahore, Punjab, Pakistan. Three people were killed and more than 21 others injured. Police believe that the target was the house which was damaged in the bombing. It is believed to be where Hafiz Saeed, co-founder of Lashkar-e-Taiba and the chief of Jama'at-ud-Da'wah was living at the time. An estimated 30kg of explosives were used.

== Investigation ==
Over the next two days, raids were conducted to arrest the suspects. They were later charged with explosives offences. Later, a foreign national identified as Peter Paul David, was offloaded from a Karachi-bound flight and shifted to an undisclosed location for interrogation. He had been shuttling between Karachi, Lahore and Dubai frequently, while he could not satisfy the investigators about the purpose of these visits and his activities. The car used in the blast had been sold multiple times and David was its last owner, who handed over his car to one of his friend for a couple of days use and has not seen his face as he was masked. Punjab Chief Minister Usman Buzdar has said "a foreign hostile agency was directly involved in the terrorist incident and had also provided the financial support to the terrorist". Investigation Officer Wakeel Ahmad said "investigators had found evidence of involvement of the Indian secret service in the attack". On 4 July 2021 Moeed Yusuf the National Security Adviser to the Prime Minister of Pakistan issued a statement that "the main mastermind of this attack belongs to R&AW, lives in India and is an Indian citizen and the 'direct origin' of the money through which the attack was financed was from India". Moreover, "the cyber attacks were also carried toward the investigation equipment so that time could be gained for the network to disperse". The Indian External Affairs spokesperson, Arindam Bagchi, rejected the allegations as "baseless propaganda".

On 27 April 2022, the Punjab Counter Terrorism Department claimed to have arrested the mastermind named as Samiul Haq, as well as the facilitator named as Uzair Akbar, of the blast from Balochistan.

== See also ==
- Terrorist incidents in Lahore since 2000
