= January 2017 Parachinar bombing =

Terrorist incident in Parachinar, Pakistan

- Parachinar (Pakistan)
- Location: Eidgah market, Parachinar, Pakistan
- Date: 21 January 2017; 9 years ago 08:50 PST
- Attack type: Bombing
- Weapon: Bomb
- Deaths: 25
- Injuries: 87
- Perpetrators: Lashkar-e-Jhangvi al-Alami; Pakistani Taliban

On 21 January 2017, a bomb was detonated at a vegetable market in Parachinar, in the Kurram Valley of the Federally Administered Tribal Areas of Pakistan. At least 25 people were killed and 87 injured by the explosion. Parachinar is the administrative headquarters of the Kurram Agency near the Afghan border. The same area has previously seen several blasts in 2008, February 2012, September 2012, 2013 and in December 2015.

Chief of Army Staff (COAS) General Qamar Bajwa visited Parachinar and paid a visit to the injured of the bomb blast in Agency Headquarters Hospital. General Bajwa also announced plans to construct an Army Public School (APS) in Parachinar to support education of the local children.

== Responsibility ==
Lashkar-e-Jhangvi al-Alami and the Pakistani Taliban splinter Shehryar Mehsud group both separately issued a joint claim of responsibility.

== Investigation ==
Seven suspects were arrested following a search operation after the blast.

== Reactions ==
- Iran - Foreign Ministry Spokesman Bahram Qassemi extended his condolences to the Pakistani government, saying that "Terrorism is the most important security problem in the region and the world and has indiscriminately targeted the countries and nations' peace and security, and fighting against it needs synergy in all-out efforts and cooperation of all the regional states and the world community."
- Bahrain - Bahrain strongly condemned the bombing, with the Bahrain News Agency quoting: "The Ministry of Foreign Affairs expresses its sincerest condolences and sympathies to the families of the victims and wishes the speedy recovery to those injured by this terrorist act that seeks to terrorize and undermine the safety and security of the country. The Ministry affirms the Kingdom of Bahrain's solidarity with the Islamic Republic of Pakistan in its struggle against terrorism and reiterates its support for all measures to stabilize the country and ensure its safety."
- Turkey - Turkish Prime Minister Binali Yildirim, in a message to Pakistani Prime Minister Nawaz Sharif, said Turkey was saddened by the incident and would continue to work with Pakistan to fight terrorism.
- United States - US Ambassador to Pakistan David Hale condemned the attack and expressed sympathy for the victims' families.
- Saudi Arabia - The Saudi Press Agency quoted an official source at the Saudi Ministry of Foreign Affairs as expressing the Kingdom's condolences to the families of victims and to the government and people of Pakistan, and wishing for a speedy recovery for the injured.

== See also ==
- March 2017 Parachinar suicide bombing
- June 2017 Pakistan bombings, another terrorist incident in Parachinar
