= 2017 Mastung suicide bombing =

Suicide bombing in Pakistan

- Part of the insurgency in Khyber Pakhtunkhwa
- Mastung (Balochistan, Pakistan) Mastung (Pakistan)
- Location: 29.408737°N 67.189449°E; Mastung District, Balochistan, Pakistan
- Date: 12 May 2017
- Target: Senator Abdul Ghafoor Haideri
- Attack type: Suicide motorcycle bombing
- Weapon: Explosive belt
- Deaths: 28
- Injuries: 40
- Victims: Hafiz Qudratullah (Naib emir of JUI-F's Quetta dist.); Iftikhar Mughal (director staff of the Senate)
- No. of participants: 1 suicide bomber

On 12 May 2017, a suicide bombing targeted the convoy of the Deputy Chairman of the Senate of Pakistan, Abdul Ghafoor Haideri, a JUI (F) member, on the N-25 National Highway in Mastung District, Balochistan, Pakistan. At least 28 people were killed; 40 others were injured, including the Senator. The Islamic State of Iraq and the Levant claimed responsibility for the attack. The attack was an unsuccessful attempt to assassinate Haideri.

== Bombing ==
The bombing took place as the suicide bomber targeted Haideri's convoy on the N-25 National Highway. The bomber rammed the motorcycle he was riding into the vehicle carrying Haideri. The vehicle was severely damaged in the blast. The attack occurred shortly after Haideri left Jama Masjid Hammadia, after attending a graduation ceremony and offering Friday prayers. Haideri, who was sitting in the front seat, survived but received injuries on his arms, leg and ear. His driver and another aide in the same vehicle were killed. Many vehicles and motorcycles, including a police car, were destroyed in the explosion.

Ghazanfar Ali, District Police Officer, Mastung, suggested after an initial probe that "a suspected suicide bomber hit Maulana Haideri's car". The Chairman of the Senate of Pakistan, Raza Rabbani, said that it was a suicide attack that targeted Haideri. After the attack while talking to the media Haideri said, "I am alive, Allah has saved my life... broken pieces of the windscreen hit me. I am injured but safe."

=== Victims ===
Maulana Hafiz Qudratullah, Naib emir of JUI (F)'s Quetta district chapter; Iftikhar Mughal, director staff of the Senate; Haideri's driver and Abdul Waheed, an Anti-Terrorism Force official, were among those killed in the bombing. Seven volunteers of the JUI-F who were escorting Haideri as guards, including Mohammad Adil, Mohammad Imran, Abdul Ghaffar, Zahoor Ahmed and Abdul Karim, were also among the victims. Several bodies could not be identified.

Dr Faisal Manan, a National journalist, was among the injured, as were a young girl and a child.

== Initial response and investigation ==
Survivors of the blast, several of whom were covered in blood, began picking up body parts that were lying scattered on the road. Immediately after the blast, security forces rushed to the site along with rescue workers. A state of emergency was declared at hospitals in Mastung and Quetta. The injured and the deceased were shifted to the District Hospital and the Nawab Ghous Bakhsh Raisani Memorial Hospital in Mastung. At least 10 seriously injured were shifted to the Trauma Centre of Civil Hospital, Quetta. While, after initial treatment Haideri along with three other injured was moved to the Combined Military Hospital in Quetta.

After collecting evidence from the scene, an official of the bomb disposal squad confirmed that it was a suicide attack. He added that around ten kilogrammes of explosives were used for the explosion. Evidence found at the blast site included ball bearings and parts of the motorcycle. A search operation began after Levies personnel cordoned off the entire area.

== Reactions ==
The President of Pakistan, Mamnoon Hussain, condemned the attack and expressed the state's resolve to protect the public by completely eradicating terrorism from the country. The Prime Minister of Pakistan, Nawaz Sharif, strongly condemned the attack and expressed his concern for the well-being of Maulana Haideri. The Chairman of Senate, Raza Rabbani, and the Interior Minister, Nisar Ali Khan, also condemned the attack, with Rabbani saying "terrorists cannot deter [the] nation's resolve against militancy through such coward attacks". The Speaker and the Deputy speaker of National Assembly also condemned the attack. Chief Minister Balochistan Nawab Sanaullah Zehri, while condemning the attack, directed the IG police to submit a report on the attack within 24 hours.

Nobel laureate Malala Yousafzai also condemned the attack. In a message, Malala wrote: "I strongly condemn Mastung blast, I and my family are praying for the speedy recovery of Maulana Abdul Ghafoor Haideri and others injured, prayers for the martyrs, terrorists want to weaken Pakistan through their heinous acts but Pakistanis stand united against terrorism and extremism."

Speaking to Geo News, JUI (F)'s Emir (chief) Maulana Fazl-ur-Rehman condemned the attack on Haideri before adding that Friday's attack was not the first on the party. "Many of our dear companions have been martyred [in this attack]," he said further, adding that, "We have to continue to work for this country and the stability of Islam." Maulana Fazlur Rehman expressed his condolences to the families of the martyrs terming the attack a very painful incident for the nation and particularly the JUI. He added that "such incidents will not stop us in our cause". The JUI-F chief also said such incidents occur "because we [JUI-F] stand with Pakistan, its law, and its Constitution".

Chairman of the Pakistan Peoples Party, Bilawal Bhutto Zardari condemned the attack saying, "controlling the menace of terrorism was collective responsibility". Chairman of Pakistan Tehreek-e-Insaf, Imran Khan condemned the attack calling it "worst terrorism incident", and added that terrorist want to create unrest.

On 13 May, a strike was observed in Quetta to mourn the death of the victims of the blast. JUI-F's party workers and supporters also held a demonstration in Quetta in protest against the suicide attack.

The militant group Lashkar-e-Jhangvi Al Alami's spokesman also condemned the suicide attack, adding that the two groups have now split due to "policy changes".

=== Local newspapers ===
The editorial of The News International noted that the attack "is a reminder that the internal challenges we face are even greater and cannot be blamed on other countries". An editorial in The Nation also mentioned that "the narrative will soon turn towards blaming the 'foreign hand' that feed terrorists in Pakistan, it must be remembered that many of our terrorist groups are entities that are very much based in Pakistan". The editorial in Dawn also echoed that "the country's civil and military leaderships will unite to condemn the attacks and bemoan them as an attempt to sabotage CPEC by outside forces. While there may be some truth to those allegations, the twin attacks in Mastung and Gwadar almost certainly have very local roots".

=== International ===
- Turkey: The Turkish Foreign Office condemned the terrorist attack, and expressed solidarity with the Government and people of Pakistan.
