= Terrorist incidents in Pakistan in 2007 =

In 2007, 34 terrorist attacks and clashes, including suicide attacks, killings, and assassinations, resulted in 134 fatalities and 245 injuries, according to the PIPS security report. The report states that Pakistan faced 20 suicide attacks (mostly targeted at security forces) during 2007, which killed at least 111 people, besides injuring 234 people. The PIPS report shows visible increase in suicide attacks after the siege of Lal Masjid.

== January – March ==
- 15 January:- A powerful blast in the Jalozai refugee camp destroyed a mud-house, killed four people and injured five others.
- 26 January:- Two people were killed and five injured in a suspected suicide attack. The bomber and a security guard were killed in the blast at the Marriott hotel in the capital city of Islamabad.
- 27 January:- At least 13 people, including the Chief of Peshawar City Police Malik Saad, were killed in the evening in a suicide bombing near a crowded Shiite mosque in Peshawar, North-West Frontier Province. About 60 people were wounded, 17 critically, in the 9:20 p.m. blast. About 2,000 Shiite Muslims were in and around the mosque, police said.
- 29 January:- 2 people were killed and 7 wounded when suicide bomber blew himself up in Dera Ismail Khan, NWFP.
- 6 February:- A suicide bomber detonated his explosives in a parking area outside Islamabad International Airport injuring 5 people.
- 17 February:- A suicide bomber killed 15 people—including a judge—after blowing himself up inside a courtroom in Quetta, Balochistan. At least 24 people were wounded in the suicide attack.
- 20 February:- Punjab the Minister for social welfare Zil-e-Huma Usman was shot and killed in Gujranwala. Her assassin, Mohammed Sarwar, was reported to have been motivated by her refusal to abide by the Islamic code of dress and a dislike for the involvement of women in political affairs.
- :- 19–22 March:- Clashes between pro-government forces under Maulvi Nazir and al-Qaeda remnants in the Waziristan region killed at least 135 people on both sides. A ceasefire was declared after four days of fighting enforced by officials from both sides.

== April – June ==
- :- 10–11 April:- Up to 35 people were killed and scores of others wounded in heavy fighting between rival Shia and Sunni (Deobandi) groups in different areas of the Kurram Agency.
- 28 April:- An assassination attempt on Aftab Ahmad Khan Sherpao, who was the Interior minister that killed 28 people in Charsadda, NWFP. This time again an attempt on a high-ranking officer of the Pakistani government was unsuccessful.
- 12 May:- As many as 50 people were killed and hundreds injured when party workers of opposing parties; MQM, ANP and PPP clashed in Karachi, Sindh. The riots started when rival political rallies took the same route amid lawyers protests for restoration of Iftikhar Muhammad Chaudhry as the Chief Justice of Supreme Court.
- 15 May:- A bomb blast at the local Marhaba hotel in Peshawar killed at least 24 people and injured 30. No one claimed responsibility for the suspected suicide blast in the lobby of the hotel popular with Afghans, where militants opposed to government support for the United States launched attacks.
- 2 June:- Five people, including a tribal chief, a political tehsildar and a journalist were killed, when their vehicle hit a roadside bomb in Dara Khwar, Bajaur District, Federally Administered Tribal Areas.
- 8 June:- Three people were killed and seven others injured when a bomb exploded on a bus in Hub, Balochistan. The coach was heading from Lasbela District, Balochistan to Karachi.
- 23 June:- A barrage of artillery and missiles fired from Afghanistan hit residential compounds and a hotel in Mangrotai area of North Waziristan, FATA, killed 11 people and wounded 10 others, eyewitnesses and officials said. The dead included two children and a woman.

== July – September ==
- 6 July:- President General Pervez Musharraf escaped yet another attempt on his life on Friday morning when around 36 rounds fired at his aircraft from a submachine gun in Rawalpindi missed their target. In another incident, four Pakistan Army troops, including a major and a lieutenant, were killed in an improvised explosive device attack on a military convoy in Dir District – a stronghold of the Jamaat-e-Islami and the banned Tehreek-e-Nafaz-e-Shariat-e-Mohammadi.
- 8 July:- Unidentified gunmen killed three Chinese workers and wounded another near Peshawar in what Pakistani officials said was a terrorist attack apparently linked to the bloody siege of militants at an Islamabad mosque.
- 12 July:- Seven people including three policemen were killed and several others injured in two suicide attacks, two blasts and a rocket attack in three tribal regions and Swat district in Khyber Pakhtunkhwa.
- 14 July:- At least 23 paramilitary troops died and 27 others injured when a suicide bomber rammed an explosives-packed car into their convoy in Miranshah in one of the deadliest attacks on the security forces in North Waziristan.
- 15 July:- At least 49 were killed and hundreds injured when suicide attack and car bombs exploded throughout Khyber Pakhtunkhwa in an apparent retaliation for Lal Masjid operation. 11 security personnel and six civilians were killed and 47 others injured in Matta, Swat District, when suicide bombers smashed two cars packed with explosives into an army convoy, and 25 people were killed and 61 injured when a suicide bomber blew himself up in the Dera Ismail Khan police recruitment center. The attack in Swat was the third attack on Army outside the conflict zones of FATA.
- 17 July:- At least 17 people were killed and 50 injured as a suicide bomber blew himself up outside the venue of the district bar council convention in Islamabad killing mostly PPP political workers waiting for the arrival of Chief Justice Iftikhar Muhammad Chaudhry, who was to address a lawyers convention.
- 19 July:- More than 40 people were killed in three separate bomb attacks. In the first incident, bomb was detonated in a mosque used by military personnel in the north-western town of Kohat, killing at least 11 people. This marked the fourth time the Army was attacked outside conflict zone since 2004. In the second one, 26 people died and 50 were injured in the southern town of Hub, Lasbela District, Balochistan, in an attack apparently targeting Chinese workers. And in the last one, at least seven people were killed and more than 20 injured in a suicide car bombing at a police academy in the north-western town of Hangu.
- 24 July:- At least nine people including a woman were killed and 40 others injured when unidentified militants fired a barrage of rockets on the civilian population in the northwestern city of Bannu.
- 27 July:- A suspected suicide bomber killed at least 13 people at Muzaffar hotel in Aabpara, Islamabad Friday after hundreds of stone-throwing protesters clashed with police as the capital's Red Mosque reopened for the first time since a bloody army raid. The same day Raziq Bugti, former guerrilla commander turned spokesman for the Balochistan government, was shot dead by assailants in Quetta.
- 2 August:- The police in Sargodha shot dead a suspected suicide bomber after the man failed to detonate the explosives he was wearing. The man, who entered a police training center, killed a policeman before he was gunned down.
- 4 August:- Nine people were killed and 43 injured when a suicide car bomber triggered an explosion at a busy bus station in Parachinar, Kurram Agency.
- 26 August:- Four policemen were killed and two others wounded in a suicide attack in the Machaar area of Shangla District.
- 4 September:- At least 25 people were killed and 66 injured in two suicide bomb blasts in Rawalpindi cantonment's high security areas during morning rush hour. The first blast took place near Qasim Market where a Defence Ministry bus carrying around 38 civilians and uniformed officials was hit, killing 18 people. Five minutes later, a second blast took place near RA Bazaar, behind General Headquarters. The blast was caused by explosives fixed to a motorcycle, which blew up killing seven people on the spot. This was the fifth time the Army was attacked outside war zone since the start of military operations, and the first time in Rawalpindi, the site of General Headquarters.
- 11 September:- At least 17 people, including three security personnel and a woman, were killed and 16 others injured when a 15-year-old suicide bomber blew himself up in a passenger van at Bannu Adda in Dera Ismail Khan district. The same day Omar Ayub Khan's protocol officer, Liaquat Hussain, was found shot dead near the Northern Bypass in Karachi.
- 13 September:- At least 20 off-duty commandos were killed and 11 injured in an apparent suicide blast at an army officers’ mess in Tarbela Ghazi, Haripur near Tarbela Dam. The targeted were the Pakistan Army's special forces unit SSG's Karar Company, and this marked the sixth time the Army was attacked outside conflict zone.
- 15 September:- Unidentified assailants shot dead Jamiat Ulema-e-Islam leader and Wafaqul Madaris Vice Chairman Maulana Hassan Jan in the jurisdiction of Yakatoot police station in Peshawar. Hassan, a former MNA, also issued a fatwa against suicide attacks, and he along with a group of Pakistani clerics travelled to Afghanistan in 2001 to convince Mullah Omar that he should expel Osama bin Laden from Afghanistan to avoid American attacks.

== October – December ==
- 1 October:- A suicide bomber wearing a woman's burqa to hide his explosives blew himself up at a busy police checkpost in Bannu, Khyber-Pakhtunkhwa, killing at least 16 people including four policemen and injuring 29.
- 12 October:- Mohmand Taliban publicly beheaded six "criminals" and lashed three others in the name of Sharia.
- 18 October:- Attack on Benazir Bhutto's convoy killed over 139 in Karachi and left more than 450 injured in one of the deadliest terrorist attacks in Pakistan. Former PM Benazir Bhutto was returning after 8 years of self-imposed exile when the bomber struck the convoy. Karachi Bombs in Pictures
- 20 October:- At least eight people were killed and 28 injured when a powerful bomb planted in a pick-up vehicle exploded in Dera Bugti, Balochistan.
- 25 October:- At least 20 people including 18 troops died and 35 others were injured in a blast aimed at a vehicle carrying Frontier Constabulary (FC) personnel in the troubled Swat district. It was suspected to be a suicide attack.
- 30 October:- A suicide bomber struck a police checkpoint in the high security zone of Rawalpindi, less than a kilometre from President General Pervez Musharraf’s camp office, killing seven people, three of them policemen, and injuring 31 others.
- 1 November:- A suicide bomber rammed his motorcycle into a PAF bus near Sargodha, killing seven officers of the Pakistan Air Force stationed at Mushaf Airbase and three civilians on the Faisalabad Road on Thursday morning. 28 people suffered injuries. It is significant that after this event a state of emergency was imposed on the country.
- 9 November:- A suicide bomber killed at least three people and injured two others when he detonated explosives at the house of Federal Political Affairs Minister and PML-Q provincial president Amir Muqam in Peshawar. The minister was unhurt, but a cousin of his was injured. The three dead were policemen guarding the house.
- :- 17–19 November:- As many as 94 people were killed and 168 injured in three days of in-fighting between the rival Sunni(Deobandi) and Shia sects in Parachinar, Kurram Agency in Pakistani tribal areas, bordering Afghanistan. Only by the fourth day, the army gained control of the area and a ceasefire was maintained in the area.
- 24 November:- 30 people were killed in two suicide attacks in Rawalpindi. In the first incident, a suicide bomber rammed his car into a 72-seater bus parked in front of Ojhri Camp on Murree Road carrying Inter-Services Intelligence (ISI) officials to work, killing 28 officials and a bystander. The second incident occurred as a second suicide bomber attempted to enter the General Headquarters (GHQ). Upon being asked for identification at the GHQ's check post, he blew himself up, resulting in the deaths of one security official and a bystander.
- 9 December:- At least 10 people including three policemen and seven civilians, including two children, perished in a car bombing near Matta, Swat District.
- 10 December:- A suicide attack on the school bus carrying children during the morning rush injuring seven of them. It was a PAF employees bus and the attack took place near Minhas Airbase, Kamra. It was a second major attack on the Pakistan Air Force after the Sargodha attack.
- 13 December:- Two suicide bombings near an army checkpoint in Quetta killed seven people, including three personnel of the Pakistan Army.
- 15 December:- A suicide attacker rammed his explosives-laden bicycle into a military checkpoint killing five people and injuring 11 others in the first-ever suicide attack in the city of Nowshera. The attack occurred at a checkpoint near the gate of an army school and was ninth one in the series of attacks against the Army outside conflict zone.
- 17 December:- 12 security personnel were killed and five wounded in a suicide attack in the country's restive northwestern city of Kohat. Victims were members of army's local football team. This attack was tenth one of its kind on the army and first one against a sports team.
- 21 December:- On the eve of Eid ul-Adha, a suicide bomb blast again targeted Aftab Ahmad Sherpao killed at least 57 and injured over 100 at Jamia Masjid Sherpao, in Charsadda District. Sherpao survived the blast; his younger son Mustafa Khan Sherpao, was injured.
- 23 December:- At least seven people, including a soldier and six civilians, were killed and other 23 wounded as a suicide bomber targeted an army convoy near Mingora.
- 27 December:- Two-times Prime Minister Benazir Bhutto was assassinated in a shooting and suicide bombing in Rawalpindi's Liaquat Bagh, killing up to 20 others and injuring many. The site is notorious as the place where former Prime Minister Liaquat Ali Khan was also assassinated in October 1951.
- 28 December:- At least 33 people, including four policemen, were killed all over Pakistan in the violence that ensued after the assassination of former prime minister Benazir Bhutto. The situation grew so worse that Sindh Rangers were given orders to shoot-at-sight.
- 28 December:- A roadside bomb killed nine people, including former PML-Q minister Asfandyar Amirzaib, who is a grandson of Wali-e-Swat, in Swat District.
