= December 2009 Lahore attacks =

Terrorist incident in Pakistan

Coordinates: 31.520139°N 74.291600°E

- Location: Allama Iqbal Town, Lahore, Pakistan
- Date: 7 December 2009; 9:00 p.m. – ? (UTC+05:00)
- Target: Civilians
- Attack type: Suicide bombing, shooting
- Deaths: At least 54
- Injuries: 150
- Perpetrators: Suicide bombers: Unknown; Shooters: Unknown

The December 2009 Lahore attacks were two coordinated bomb blasts and a shooting in a crowded market in Lahore, Pakistan on 7 December 2009. At least 54 people were killed and another 150 wounded.

== Attacks ==
The blasts took place in the Moon Market of Lahore's Allama Iqbal Town late in the night. One of the blasts was in front of a branch of the Muslim Commercial Bank and the second in front of a jewllers shop in Moon Market. The two blasts which occurred within 30 seconds of each other resulted in a blaze which engulfed the shops in the market. The attack came at about 9:00 pm local time and struck a corner of the market where women were buying clothes. After the blasts the militants fired at the people fleeing the scene. Most of the victims were women. The second blast was near an electricity pole and caused a short circuit which is thought to have led to the fire.

== Story ==
After initial investigations Civil Defence District Officer Mazhar Ahmed stated that it appeared that both blasts were caused by suicide bombers. According to preliminary reports the bombers were about 18 years of age and from southern Punjab (Pakistan). The Federal Bureau of Investigation sent a team to the market who collected samples of explosives and other evidence from the site.

Widespread conspiracy theories circulated after the attacks that India and United States were behind the violence and government officials stoked this perception. However analyst Hassan Askari-Rizvi dismissing these theories stated that the idea that India may be behind the terror attacks is "a very widely shared perception, but there's hardly any evidence to substantiate that. They [the militants] have attacked civilians in the past. I think the government consciously creates that confusion."

== See also ==
- List of terrorist incidents in Pakistan since 2001
