= March 2017 Parachinar suicide bombing =

Terrorist incident in Pakistan

- Part of the War in North-West Pakistan
- Parachinar (Pakistan)
- Location: Parachinar, Pakistan
- Date: 31 March 2017
- Attack type: Bombing
- Weapon: Bomb
- Deaths: 24
- Injuries: 70+
- Perpetrator: Jamaat-ul-Ahrar
- Motive: Sectarianism

On 31 March 2017, a car bombing took place at a market in Parachinar, northwest Pakistan. The bombing was believed to be motivated by sectarianism, as the majority of the area's residents are Shia Muslims. At least 24 people were killed and more than 70 injured as a result of the blast. Prime Minister Nawaz Sharif and other political leaders condemned the attack.

== See also ==
- January 2017 Parachinar bombing
