= July 2017 Lahore suicide bombing =

Suicide bombing in Lahore, Pakistan

- Part of War in North-West Pakistan
- Ferozepur Road, Lahore (Lahore) Ferozepur Road, Lahore (Punjab, Pakistan) Ferozepur Road, Lahore (Pakistan)
- Location: Ferozepur Road, Lahore, Punjab, Pakistan
- Date: 24 July 2017; 15:55:34 (PST)
- Target: Police officials
- Attack type: Suicide bombing
- Deaths: 26 (+1 bomber)
- Injuries: 54
- Victims: Policemen and civilians
- Perpetrator: Tehreek-i-Taliban Pakistan (claimed responsibility)
- No. of participants: 1

On 24 July 2017, a suicide bombing in a vegetable market in Lahore, Pakistan, killed 26 people and injured 58 others. Security officials believe that the attack targeted policemen; the casualties included nine policemen killed and six wounded. Tehreek-i-Taliban Pakistan claimed responsibility for the attack.

== Bombing ==
At around 15:55 (PST), a bomb attached to a motorbike exploded in an old vegetable market in the neighbourhood of Kot Lakhpat. The market was full of police at the time because officers had been sent to clear stalls that had illegally spilled into the road. According to DIG Operations Haider Ashraf, the blast was a suicide attack and "police were the target." Two vehicles, including one motorcycle, have reportedly been damaged.

Hussain, one of the injured policemen told The Express Tribune:

We were standing under a tree when I spotted an auto rickshaw coming from the wrong side. I rushed to warn the driver fearing he might get hurt as heavy machinery was tearing down encroachment in the area. As soon as I walked towards the rickshaw, a loud explosion went off tossing me on the ground. I tried to get up but stooped over due to excruciating pain in my back. I looked around and found bodies lying everywhere and blood splattered.

== Aftermath ==
Soon after the attack, police and other law enforcement personnel reached the site of the incident and cordoned off the area. Forensics teams started collecting evidence from the blast site. Rescue 1122 teams started taking the injured to nearby hospitals where a state of emergency was imposed. Pictures of the deceased policemen were released on Lahore Police's official Twitter account.

=== Reactions ===
The then Prime Minister, Nawaz Sharif condemned the attack and expressed deep grief and sorrow over the loss of many lives. CM Punjab, Shahbaz Sharif condemned the attack saying, "No words can express the grief which grips my heart right now. [The] blast destroyed many families, but terrorists can never destroy our resolve." DG ISPR Asif Ghafoor tweeted, "COAS shares grief with victim families of Lhr blast. Directs for immediate rescue and relief efforts. Troops reached at site." Chairman of Pakistan Tehreek-e-Insaf Imran Khan has condemned Lahore blast and termed it the "worst example of terrorism". PTI Secretary Information Shafqat Mahmood also condemned the blast and expressed his sympathies to the bereaved families. Tahir-ul-Qadri have also condemned the attack. In a tweet, he said, "The loss of precious lives in [the] terrorist attack in Lahore is regrettable and highly condemnable." Interior Minister, Chudhary Nisar postponed his much awaited press conference saying it was not possible for him to address political issues in the wake of casualties. Maryam Nawaz, in a tweet, said, "Sad, heart-wrenching news from Lahore. May Allah SWT protect Pakistan. Ameen".

== See also ==
- Terrorist incidents in Pakistan in 2017
- Terrorist incidents in Lahore since 2000
