= 2011 Charsadda bombing =

Suicide bombing by Islamist militants in Charsadda, Khyber Pakhtunkhwa, Pakistan

Coordinates: 34.2153°N 71.5553°E

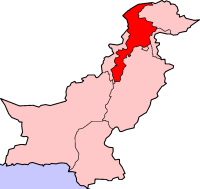
- The location of Khyber Pakhtunkhwa in Pakistan
- Location: Charsadda District, Khyber Pakhtunkhwa, Pakistan
- Date: 13 May 2011
- Attack type: Bombing
- Deaths: 98
- Injuries: 140
- Perpetrator: Tehrik-i-Taliban Pakistan

A double bombing occurred on 13 May 2011 in Shabqadar Fort in Charsadda District of Khyber Pakhtunkhwa province of Pakistan. 98 people were killed when two suicide bombs exploded in the Frontier Constabulary training centre. At least 140 others were injured. The explosions occurred while cadets were getting into buses for a ten-day leave after a training course.

== Background ==
It was the deadliest attack in Pakistan following the death of al-Qaeda founder Osama bin Laden, which had raised concerns regarding potential retaliatory violence over alleged Pakistani involvement. The Frontier Constabulary is a paramilitary force of approximately 70,000 personnel responsible for guarding foreign embassies in major cities and operating checkpoints in Khyber Pakhtunkhwa. Established in the late 19th century and administered by police service, the force serves as a major source of employment for individuals from low-income households in the region.

== Bombing ==
The bomber was outside the training academy when he exploded his car at about 6 am local time. Most of those killed were men waiting to go home after completing 6 months of training. Mohammad Sardar, who was wounded in the head and admitted to the Lady Reading Hospital in Peshawar, said: "There are two occasions in one’s life to celebrate: wedding and going home on vacations at the end of six months of training. So we were all happy, celebrating the occasion, with bedrolls on our heads, thinking of home, when the first explosion occurred, followed by a second."

== Responsibility ==
The Tehrik-i-Taliban Pakistan officially claimed responsibility for the bombing, saying the attack was in revenge for bin Laden's death. "This was the first revenge for Osama’s martyrdom. Wait for bigger attacks in Pakistan and Afghanistan." However, some local officials doubted the attack was carried out in revenge for bin Laden, saying the attack may have possibly been conducted by a splinter group of the Taliban as a reaction to the Pakistani Army's latest assault against Taliban militants in the Mohmand region along Afghanistan.

== Reactions ==
In financial markets, the yen rose following the attack on concern of increased instability and as the yen is generally considered a stable refuge.

Within Pakistan, the attack was condemned by the President, Prime Minister and other political figures. MQM chief Altaf Hussain expressed sorrow and regret over the loss of lives. The Chief Minister of Sindh Syed Qaim Ali Shah also expressed his sympathy.

In a telephone conversation with Prime Minister Yousaf Raza Gillani, British Prime Minister David Cameron expressed his condolences over the attack, assured his support to Pakistan and said that the United Kingdom knew well Islamabad was facing political turmoil, which was heavily taking a toll on its men and material.

Gillani stated: "Pakistan is committed to working with the rest of the world to eradicate terrorism. It will also take care of its national interests."

The United States embassy in Pakistan condemned the attack. "We extend our condolences to the Pakistan Armed Forces, and families and friends of the victims. Terrorists have shown time and again that they are the true enemy of the people and government of Pakistan," a statement from the embassy said.

== See also ==
- List of terrorist incidents in Pakistan since 2001
- War in North-West Pakistan
