= February 2017 Lahore suicide bombing =

Terrorist attack in Lahore, Pakistan

2017 Lahore suicide bombing
- Part of the War in North-West Pakistan
- Location of the Charing Cross in Lahore, where the attack occurred.
- Location: 31°33′32.4″N 74°19′26.4″E; Charing Cross, The Mall, Lahore, Punjab, Pakistan
- Date: 13 February 2017; 18:10 (UTC+05:00)
- Target: Police officials
- Attack type: Suicide bombing
- Weapon: Explosive belt
- Deaths: At least 18 (+1 bomber)
- Injuries: Over 90
- Victims: Zahid Gondal (SSP Operations, Punjab Police); Ahmed Mobin (DIG Traffic, Lahore)
- Perpetrator: Jamaat-ul-Ahrar (claimed)

On 13 February 2017, a suicide bombing took place on the Mall Road in Lahore, Pakistan, where a group of chemists and pharmacists were holding a protest at Charing Cross in front of the Punjab provincial assembly. According to Punjab Police sources, 18 people were killed, including several police officials, and at least 87 were injured.

Jamaat-ul-Ahrar, a faction of the banned Tehrik-i-Taliban (TTP), claimed responsibility for the attack. Local authorities cordoned off the site to begin investigations. According to Pakistani authorities, the attack was orchestrated from Afghanistan, where the militant group operates sanctuaries. On 23 February, Pakistani security forces killed the mastermind of the attack, Wajihullah, near the Afghan border following the launch of Operation Radd-ul-Fasaad.

== Background ==
The attack took place less than a year after the Gulshan-e-Iqbal Park suicide bombing, which occurred in Lahore in March 2016. At the time of the attack, the targeted location was populated by a group of pharmaceutical manufacturers and chemists, who were demonstrating against a Punjab government crackdown on illegal drugs. The Provincial Assembly of the Punjab had passed amendments to the Drug Act, 1976 on 8 February 2017. The amendments in the act hardened the rules and regulations for medical stores. The law also required medical stores across the Punjab to recruit at least one pharmacist. Various medical associations had called for a provincial-wide strike to protest against the bill.

There were at least 400 protesters present at the Mall Road, and a significant number of police officers were deployed to the venue to maintain the situation. A suicide bomber reached the location and detonated himself while the protest was ongoing.

Earlier on 7 February, the National Counter Terrorism Authority (NACTA) had shared intelligence with Punjab's home secretary, police and Rangers over the threat of a possible terrorist incident in Lahore. The notification had directed authorities to safeguard and keep vigilance over all "vital installations, including important buildings, hospitals and schools." Prior to this, another notification dated 29 January from the Punjab government's Home Department had warned of a possible terrorist attack in the city, stating that the Tehrik-i-Taliban was training young suicide bombers in Kunar, Afghanistan, for that purpose.

According to Punjab's law minister Rana Sanaullah, appropriate security measures had been taken following the alert, adding that: "The spot where the blast took place is always under threat. Even if there was no alert, strict security measures are always taken in the area." Commenting on the TTP militant outfit behind the bombing, Sanaullah added: "We aren't really sure if it is a new group of terrorists. It is the same old organisation working now from Afghanistan, probably since the North and South Waziristans have already been cleared."

== Bombing ==
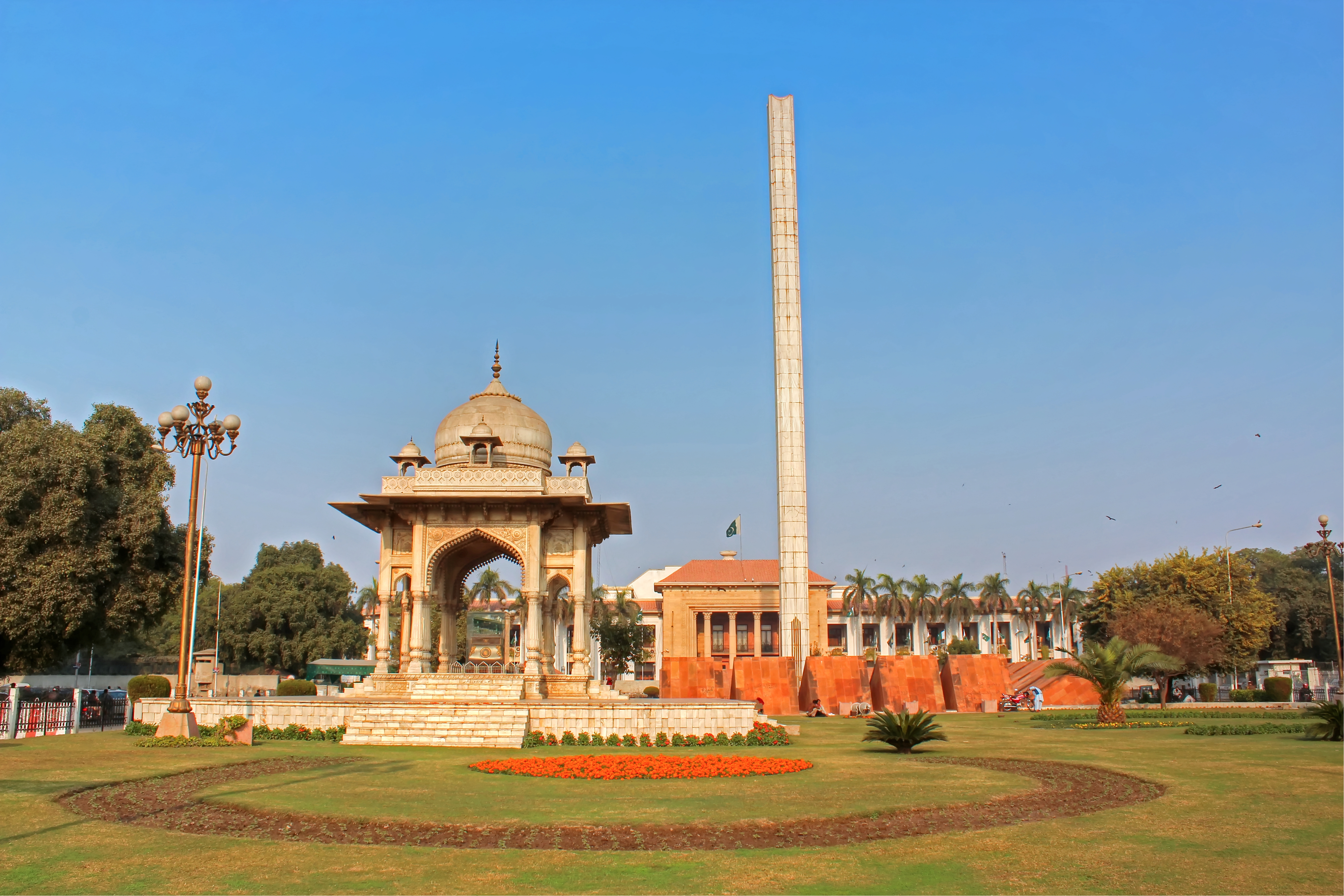
The Charing Cross, located across the Punjab provincial assembly building, where the protesters were assembled.

The suicide bomber struck the protest in the evening at around 18:10 local time. According to a Counter Terrorism Department official, the perpetrator had traveled by foot as revealed by closed-circuit footage. Soon after the blast, contingents of the Pakistan Army and Rangers were deployed to the site and cordoned off the area near the crowded Mall Road, one of the city's main arteries, as witnesses fled amid fears of a second explosion, with images of the injured being carried away shown by local media. Forensic teams began collecting evidence to start investigations. Jamaat-ul-Ahrar claimed responsibility for the attack via a text message, calling it revenge for the Pakistani military's counterinsurgency operation against militants holed up in the northwestern tribal areas across the Afghan border. The group had also issued threats three days prior to the attack, stating it would target government installations throughout the country as part of a campaign called "Operation Ghazi".

Police personnel were believed to be the primary target. Seven policemen were among those killed, including two senior officers identified as Zahid Gondal, a senior superintendent of the Punjab Police, and Ahmad Mobin, a deputy inspector general of Lahore's Traffic Police. Mobin was seen on television news hours earlier, negotiating with the protesters.

The DSNG van of AAJ TV, close to which the bomber had struck, was completely destroyed as a result of the blast. Two more DSNG vans were slightly damaged. Two suspects were taken into custody from the site after security forces placed a security cordon around Charing Cross. The initial investigations suggested that the suicide bomber had three accomplices. According to the police, over six to eight kilogrammes of explosives were used in the blast.

In total, at least 18 were killed and over 90 were wounded in the Lahore bombing. In a separate incident later on the same day, an improvised explosive device planted under a bridge in Quetta detonated, killing at least three bomb disposal squad officers who were trying to defuse it. Around eleven others were wounded, one critically, marking an uptick of recent terrorist incidents.

== Aftermath ==
Following the attack, the injured were immediately shifted to Mayo Hospital and Sir Ganga Ram Hospital by Rescue 1122 ambulances. A state of emergency was declared for all hospitals in Lahore. Some of the injured were in critical condition.

On 15 February, the Pakistani Foreign Office summoned Afghan Deputy Head of Mission, Syed Abdul Nasir Yousafi, and presented a dossier outlining evidence of terrorist sanctuaries, financiers and handlers from Afghanistan who were involved in the attack. Authorities formed a Joint Investigation Team (JIT) to probe the attack, consisting of the Crime Investigation Department, Inter-Services Intelligence, Intelligence Bureau and police. The police also conducted a series of raids in Lahore to nab suspects and took into custody 43 people, most of them Afghan nationals.

On 17 February, Chief Minister Punjab Shehbaz Sharif announced the arrest of Anwar-ul-Haq - the alleged facilitator of the attacker, who belonged to FATA's Bajaur Agency. He also claimed that the suspects involved in planning and carrying out of the attack belonged to Afghanistan. On 18 February, Haq's two brothers Khalilullah and Hameedullah were taken into custody during a raid on his house in Mamund tehsil of Bajaur Agency.

== Reactions ==
=== Domestic ===
Prime Minister Nawaz Sharif condemned the blast, expressing in a statement: "We have fought this fight against the terrorists among us, and will continue to fight it until we liberate our people of this cancer, and avenge those who have laid down their lives for us."

A statement released by the military's Inter-Services Public Relations stated that the army chief, General Qamar Javed Bajwa, had called upon local military commanders and intelligence agencies to provide all possible assistance to the civilian authorities, and apprehend the perpetrators.

Punjab's chief minister Shehbaz Sharif announced a day of mourning following the incident. Local residents denounced the perpetrators and implored the government to do more to ensure the safety of citizens. Chairman of Pakistan Tehreek-e-Insaf, Imran Khan asked for Rangers operation in Punjab. Social media users noted the timing of the attack could derail the final of the Pakistan Super League (PSL) from being held in Lahore, which was scheduled subject to security clearances for foreign players. PSL's chairman Najam Sethi said that foreign players were wary of playing the final in Lahore, in light of security concerns. Many in Pakistan accused India of having a role behind the attack.

The Pakistan Stock Exchange's (PSX) benchmark KSE 100 Index finished with a fall 0.40% or 197.72 points to end at 49,767.91, as investors remained concerned over the terrorist attack. The KSE 100 Index fell by as much as 435 points in intra-day trading. Trading volumes fell to 353 million shares compared with the previous day's tally of 362 million.

=== International ===
- Bahrain: The Ministry of Foreign Affairs of the Kingdom of Bahrain strongly condemned the terrorist blast and expressed its heartfelt condolences and sincere consolation to the relatives and families of the victims and its wishes for speedy recovery of the people who were wounded in this terrorist act that is alien to all religious, human and moral values. It affirmed the support of the Kingdom of Bahrain to the friendly Islamic Republic of Pakistan in confronting violence, extremism and terrorism of all sorts.
- China: The Chinese government expressed its shock at the incident, and issued a condemnation: "We condemn this terrorist attack and extend deep condolences to the victims. We honour the law-enforcement officials who sacrificed their lives in the explosion. We express sincere sympathy to the families of the victims and hope the wounded recover at an early date."
- France: The French foreign ministry strongly condemned the attack and reaffirmed the determination of Paris to stand by Pakistan in the face of the scourge of terrorism. The ministry expressed condolences to the families of the victims and wishes for the recovery of the injured.
- Iran: The Iranian Foreign Ministry condemned the deadly terrorist attack. Iranian Foreign Ministry Spokesman Bahram Qasemi said, "Through such inhuman and brutal measures, terrorist groups seek to target the determination of regional nations in fighting terrorism." Qasemi expressed sympathy with the Pakistani government, people and families of the victims saying that Iran would always stand by Pakistan in their battle against terrorism.
- Turkey: Turkey strongly condemned the terrorist attack that targeted a group of protesters in Lahore. The Turkish Foreign Ministry said in a statement that it had received the news with great sorrow that targeted the demonstration and expressed condolences to the Government of Pakistan and the brotherly Pakistanis and the families of the victims of the terrorist attack and wished God's mercy upon those who lost their lives and a speedy recovery to the injured in the attack. Turkey reaffirmed her stance to stand by Pakistan in her fight against terrorism.
- Saudi Arabia: An official source at the Ministry of Foreign Affairs expressed the Kingdom of Saudi Arabia's strong condemnation of the bomb attacks in the Pakistani city of Lahore killing and wounding tens of people. The official source offered the Kingdom's condolences to the families of the victims as well as the government and people of the Islamic Republic of Pakistan, wishing a speedy recovery to the wounded.
- United Kingdom: British High Commissioner Thomas Drew called the attack "cowardly" and expressed his support for the victims.
- United States: The Department of State's Deputy Spokesperson, Mark Toner, addressed a press briefing in Washington, during which he expressed condolences for the victims' families, and conveyed the US' solidarity with Pakistan. US ambassador David Hale released the following statement: "We condemn today’s cowardly attack in Lahore against peaceful protesters, press and police. Our deepest condolences go out to the families of the victims. We stand with Pakistan in its fight against terrorism."

=== Supranational ===
- European Union: The European Union said that it was "shocked and saddened" by the incident.

== See also ==
- 2016 Lahore suicide bombing
- Terrorist incidents in Pakistan in 2017
- Terrorist incidents in Lahore since 2000
