= 2017 Charsadda suicide bombing =

Terrorist incident in Pakistan

- Part of the War in North-West Pakistan and Operation Ghazi
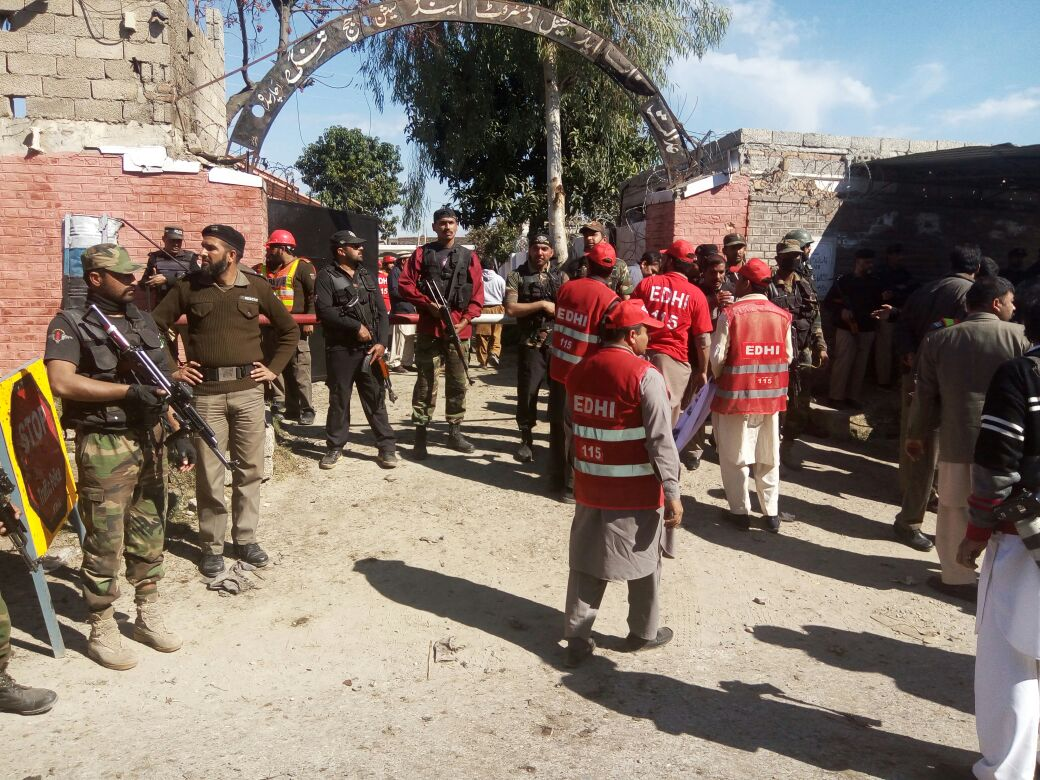

- Tangi (Pakistan)
- Location: Tangi, Khyber Pakhtunkhwa, Pakistan
- Date: 21 February 2017
- Target: Sessions court
- Attack type: Suicide bombing
- Weapons: Suicide belts, hand grenades, assault rifle
- Deaths: 7 (+3 bombers)
- Injuries: 20
- Assailant: three suicide bombers

On 21 February 2017, suicide bombers targeted a sessions court in Tangi, Charsadda District, Khyber Pakhtunkhwa, Pakistan. At least seven people were killed, including a lawyer and more than 20 others injured. Internationally designated terrorist group Tehrik-i-Taliban Pakistan's faction Jamaat-ul-Ahrar claimed responsibility for the attack.

== Bombing ==
The explosions took place at the entrance of the sessions court. Three suicide attackers were involved in the attack. The attackers were neutralized after a 20-minute gun battle with security personnel. The three attackers also hurled six grenades. Four judges and around 40 lawyers were present on the court premises when the terrorists attacked the judicial complex. According to DIG Mardan, each bomber carried seven kilograms of explosives in his suicide vest. Later, a CCTV footage available with the media showed the alleged suicide bombers of the attack being stopped by the police to and asked to remove the shawls they were wearing.

== Aftermath ==
About 10 ambulances were dispatched to Tangi from Peshawar, where the Lady Reading Hospital had been put on high alert. The injured were taken to Tehsil Headquarters Hospital while the critically injured were later shifted to Lady Reading Hospital in Peshawar. The body parts of the suicide bombers were sent to Lahore for identification.

On 22 February 2017, security forces claimed to have arrested three facilitators of the suicide bombers. They were shifted to an undisclosed location for interrogation. The Inspector General of Khyber Pakhtunkhwa Police claimed that the suicide bombers had come from Afghanistan through Mohmand Agency.

On 23 February 2017, at least three gunmen attacked the NADRA office in Charsadda. The attack was foiled when police returned fire forcing the attackers to flee. Following the attack, two motorcycles of the attackers were taken into possession. The area was then cordoned off and a search operation was initiated.

== Reactions ==
On 22 February 2017, in response to the Operation Ghazi, Pakistan Army launched Operation Radd-ul-Fasaad (literally meaning elimination of discord) across the country. The operation aimed at indiscriminately eliminating residual threat of terrorism and consolidating gains of operations made so far. It further aimed at ensuring security of the borders. The countrywide de-weaponisation and explosive control were laid as the additional objectives of the operation.

Prime Minister Nawaz Sharif strongly condemned the attack and expressed grief over the loss of lives while praying for the victims. He praised the role of law enforcing agencies which prevented the attack while resolving to "continue to fight against terrorist elements". Chief Justice Saqib Nisar also condemned the attack and offered condolences to the victim's families.

An editorial in The Nation, said that the response by security forces "can only be described as police heroics" while emphasizing on a need for "communal intelligence gathering" to foil future attacks. The editorial in The News International said that "the police officials who stopped the Charsadda attack should, no doubt, be praised". The Express Tribune's editorial lauded "the valiant efforts ... of those on duty" while questioning the "intelligence failure".
