= 2008 Charsadda bombing =

Terrorist incident in Pakistan

Coordinates: 34.14°N 71.73°E

- Location: Charsadda, Pakistan
- Date: 9 February 2008
- Target: Awami National Party
- Attack type: Suicide attack
- Deaths: 27
- Injuries: 50

In the Charsadda bombing of 9 February 2008, a suicide bomber killed at least 27 people and another 50 were injured in Charsadda, Pakistan attending a political rally for the opposition Awami National Party. No group claimed responsibility for the attack, but Interior Minister Hamid Nawaz Khan suspected Al-Qaeda or Taliban-linked groups were responsible after threatening all political parties in the North-West Frontier Province. The bombing occurred nine days before the 2008 Pakistani general election which had been postponed in the wake of the assassination of Benazir Bhutto on 27 December 2007 in Rawalpindi.
