= Explosive belt =

Explosive device that an individual wears

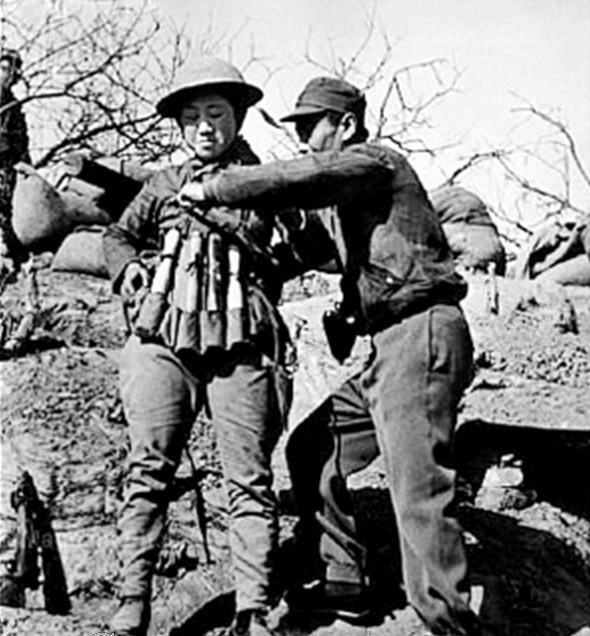
Chinese suicide bomber putting on an explosive vest made out of Model 24 hand grenades to use in an attack on Japanese tanks at the Battle of Taierzhuang (1938)

An explosive belt (also called suicide belt, suicide vest, bomb vest, shahid belt or shaheed belt) is an improvised explosive device, a belt or a vest packed with explosives and armed with a detonator, worn by suicide bombers. Explosive belts are usually packed with ball bearings, nails, screws, bolts, and other objects that serve as shrapnel to maximize the number of casualties in the explosion.

== History ==
The Chinese used explosive vests during the Second Sino-Japanese War. A Chinese soldier detonated a grenade vest and killed 20 Japanese at Sihang Warehouse. Chinese troops strapped explosives like grenade packs or dynamite to their bodies and threw themselves over Japanese tanks to blow them up. This tactic was used during the Battle of Shanghai, where a Chinese suicide bomber stopped a Japanese tank column by exploding himself beneath the lead tank, and at the Battle of Taierzhuang, where Chinese troops rushed at Japanese tanks and blew themselves up with dynamite and grenades. During one incident at Taierzhuang, Chinese suicide bombers destroyed four Japanese tanks with grenade bundles.

The use of suicidal attacks to inflict damage upon an enemy predates the Second World War, in which Kamikaze units (suicidal air attacks) and Kaiten ("living torpedoes") were used to attack Allied forces. Japanese soldiers routinely detonated themselves by attacking Allied tanks while carrying antitank mines, magnetic demolition charges, hand grenades and other explosive devices.

== Description ==
The explosive belt usually consists of several cylinders filled with explosive (de facto pipe bombs), or in more sophisticated versions with plates of explosive. The explosive is surrounded by a fragmentation jacket that produces the shrapnel responsible for most of the bomb's lethality, effectively making the jacket a crude, body-worn, Claymore mine. Once the vest is detonated, the explosion resembles an omnidirectional shotgun blast. The most dangerous and the most widely used shrapnel are steel balls 3–7 mm (1/8–9/32 in) in diameter. Other shrapnel material can be anything of suitable size and hardness, most often nails, screws, nuts, and thick wire. Shrapnel is responsible for about 90% of all casualties caused by this kind of device.

A "loaded" vest may weigh between 5 and 20 kilograms (10 and 45 lb) and may be hidden under thick clothes, usually jackets or snow coats.

A suicide vest may cover the entire stomach and usually has shoulder straps.

A common security procedure against suspected suicide bombers is to move the suspect at least 15 metres (50 ft) away from other people, then ask them to remove their upper clothing. While this procedure is relatively uncontroversial for use on males, it may cause an issue when dealing with females suspected of being suicide bombers. Male security personnel may be reluctant to inspect or strip-search females, and can be accused of sexual harassment after having done so. Alternatively, an infrared detector can be used. There are assertions that using a millimeter wave scanner would be viable for the task, but the concept has been disputed.

The discovery of remains as well as incidentally unexploded belts or vests can offer forensic clues to the investigation after the attack.

== Forensic investigation ==
Suicide bombers who wear the vests are often obliterated by the explosion; the best evidence of their identity is the head, which often remains relatively intact because it is separated and thrown clear off the body by the explosion. Journalist Joby Warrick conjectured: "The vest's tight constraints and the positioning of the explosive pouches would channel the energy of the blast outward, toward whoever stood directly in front of him. Some of that energy wave would inevitably roll upward, ripping the bomber's body apart at its weakest point, between the neck bones and lower jaw. It accounts for the curious phenomenon in which suicide bombers' heads are severed clean at the moment of detonation and are later found in a state of perfect preservation several metres away from the torso's shredded remains."
