= Jalil =

Jalil, Jahlil, Jaleel, or Celil is a masculine given name and surname of Arabic origin. Notable people with the name include:

== Given name ==
=== Celil ===
- Celil Nalçakan (born 1978), Turkish actor and singer
- Celil Oker (1952–2019), Turkish writer
- Celil Yüksel (born 1998), Turkish footballer

=== Jahlil ===
- Jahlil Beats (born 1988), American hip hop record producer
- Jahlil Okafor (born 1995), Nigerian-American basketball player
- Jahlil Tripp (born 1997), American basketball player

=== Jaleel ===
- Jaleel Ahmad (1941–1996), Indian Islamic scholar, educator, and politician
- Jaleel Cousins (born 1993), American basketball player
- Jaleel Croal (born 2003), British Virgin Islands sprinter
- Jaleel Johnson (born 1994), American football player
- Jaleel Khan (born 1954), Indian politician
- Jaleel McLaughlin (born 2000), American football player
- Jaleel Roberts (born 1992), American basketball player
- Jaleel Scott (born 1995), American football player
- Jaleel Seve-Derbas (born 1996), Lebanese rugby league footballer
- Jaleel Shaw (born 1978), American jazz alto saxophonist
- Jaleel White (born 1976), American actor

=== Jalil ===
- Jalil Andrabi (died 1996), Kashmiri victim of Jalil Andrabi murder case
- Jalil Anibaba (born 1988), American footballer
- Jalil Baghdadbeyov (1887–1951), Azerbaijani art critic and ethnographer
- Jalil Bethea (born 2005), American basketball player
- Jalil Brown (born 1987), American football player
- Jalil Carter (born 1989), American football player
- Jalil Che Din (1934–1992), Malaysian footballer
- Jalil Eftekhari (born 1965), Iranian cyclist
- Jalil Elías (born 1996), Argentinian-Syrian footballer
- Jalil Farjad (born 1952), Iranian actor
- Jalil Farooq (born 2001), American football player
- Jalil Hanoon (born 1952), Iraqi footballer
- Jalil Hashim, Iraqi basketball player
- Jalil Huseynov (born 1957), Azerbaijani painter
- Jalil Jafari (born 1967), Iranian politician
- Jalil Javadov (1918–1980), Soviet Azerbaijani Army officer
- Jalil Bagheri Jeddi (born 1972), Iranian paralympic athlete
- Jalil Abbas Jilani (born 1955), Pakistani diplomat
- Jalil Keyekbaev (1911–1968), Soviet linguist
- Jalil Khazal (born 1960), Iraqi poet, writer, and a researcher
- Jalil Lespert (born 1976), French actor, screenwriter and director
- Jalil Mammadguluzadeh (1866–1932), Azerbaijani satirist and writer
- Jalil Mokhtar (born 1974), Iranian politician
- Jalil Moslemi, Iranian fighter pilot
- Jalil Muntaqim (born 1951), American political activist
- Jalil Ramli (born 1965), Malaysian footballer
- Jalil Rasouli (born 1947), Iranian artist and Persian calligrapher
- Jalil Safarov (1962–1992), Azerbaijani war hero
- Jalil Shahnaz (1921–2013), Iranian musician and tar player
- Jalil Shihab (born 1927), Iraqi footballer
- Jalil Tarif, Jordanian economist
- Jalil Zaidan (born 1967), Iraqi footballer
- Jalil Zaland (1935–2009), Afghan poet, composer, and singer
- Jalil Zandi (1951–2001), Iranian fighter pilot
- Jalil Ziapour (1920–1999), Iranian painter
- Khalil Jalil Hamza (died 2007), Iraqi politician

== Surname ==
=== Jaleel ===
- Ali Jaleel (1979–2009), Maldivian alleged terrorist
- Moosa Ali Jaleel (born 1960), Maldivian army officer
- Muzamil Jaleel (born 1972), Indian journalist

=== Jalil ===
- Ananta Jalil (born 1978), Bangladeshi actor, director, producer, and industrialist
- Jalile Jalil (born 1936), Kurdish historian
- Jannat Jalil, British TV and radio news presenter
- Javeria Jalil (born 1972), Pakistani actress
- Nasreen Jalil (born 1947), Pakistani politician
- Qanita Jalil (born 1982), Pakistani cricketer
- Raúl Jalil (born 1963), Argentine politician
- Tábata Jalil (born 1979), Mexican TV host

== Places ==
- Jalil, Iran, a village in Kohgiluyeh and Boyer-Ahmad Province, Iran
- Bukit Jalil, a suburb of Kuala Lumpur, Malaysia
- Puncak Jalil, a township in Selangor, Malaysia
- Oum El Djalil, a town in Algeria
- Galilee (romanized al-Jalīl), a region in Israel
- Ijlil al-Qibliyya, (Southern al-Jalil), a village in Palestine depopulated and destroyed in 1948
- Ijlil al-Shamaliyya, (Northern al-Jalil), a village in Palestine depopulated and destroyed in 1948

== Other ==
- al-Jalil, "The Majestic", a name of God in Islam
- S. M. Jaleel and Company, a Trinidadian drinks company
- Jalil (horse), an American racehorse

== See also ==
- Jalili
- Jalal, a given name and surname
- Djalil (disambiguation)
- Dzhalil (disambiguation)
