= Andrabi =

Surname/Laqab used by Persians

Regions with significant populations
- Middle East, India

Languages
- Arabic, Urdu, Persian, Pashto, Kashmiri

Andrabi is a surname of Persian origin associated with the Andarab region. The surname is commonly found among people whose ancestral roots trace back to Andarab and is used by communities across South Asia mostly in Indian administered Kashmir, the Middle East, and other parts of the world through migration. While the surname has strong cultural and linguistic ties to the Persian-speaking world, it is also found among some Kurdish and other regional communities such as those lived in Khorasan. In the context of Kashmir Andrabi’s are mostly associated with lineage of Syed Mir Mirak Andrabi who was also closely related to Mir Syed Ali Hamdani. Andrabis in Kashmir have largely settled around the Khanqah in Srinagar Malratta Nowhatta which historically served as a powerful site of religious, political and social movements. Prominent Sufi groups and individuals were associated with Andrabi for their close affiliation to the Qadriyya Sufi order.

Notable people with the surname include:

- Shaykh Syed Mir Mirak Andrabi, 15th-century scholar
- Tahir R. Andrabi, economist
- Muhammed Amin Andrabi, scholar
- Jalil Andrabi, human rights activist
- Farooq Ahmad Andrabi, Indian politician

Syed Jalal Din Ajaz Andrabi for his remarkable translation of Holy Quran Into Kashmiri Ajazal-Quran.
