= Dzhalil =

Dzhalil may refer to:

- 3082 Dzhalil, a main-belt asteroid
- Dzhalil (urban-type settlement), an urban locality in Sarmanovsky District, Republic of Tatarstan, Russia
- An alternate name for Cəlilli, Tovuz District, Azerbaijan

== See also ==
- Jalil (disambiguation)
- Djalil (disambiguation)
