= Souq Bab al-Saray =

Old marketplace in Mosul, Iraq

Coordinates: 36.34298°N 43.13546°E

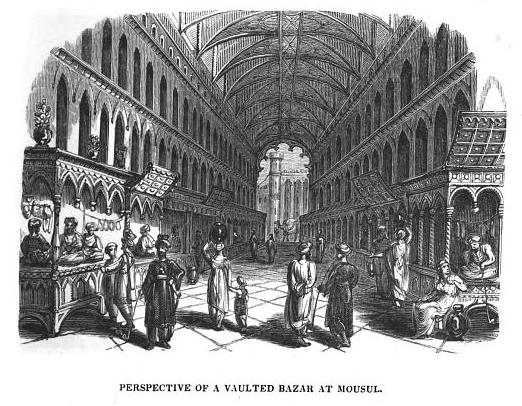
Souq Bab al-Saray (Buckingham, 1827).

Souq Bab al-Saray is a heritage marketplace on the banks of the Tigris in Old Mosul, Iraq. Its origins as a commercial hub date back to the establishment of al-Masfi Mosque in 637 CE. During the Jalili era, it was the central marketplace of the city, and contained the most important khans and bazars. By the mid-1900s, it was a major bazaar where traders of silk, spice and textiles gathered weekly; Bab al-Saray was particularly known for its blacksmiths, carpenters, and sculptors.

Although many of its historical structures and handicrafts were lost during the last war in 2017, merchants have since rebuilt their stalls, and the souq continues provide food, cookware, clothing, and other essentials to the local community. By 2022, nearly all of the original shops at Bab al-Saray had returned, including the butchers, blacksmiths, and fabric and spice merchants.

The sprawling marketplace has many intersecting roads, between 1 and 2 meters wide, each specializing in trading specific items. Decorations and product offerings change throughout the year in observance of annual celebrations.

Bab al-Saray is also the site of Old Mosul's handicraft markets, including such as Safareen, Hadadeen, Bazazeen, and Atareen.

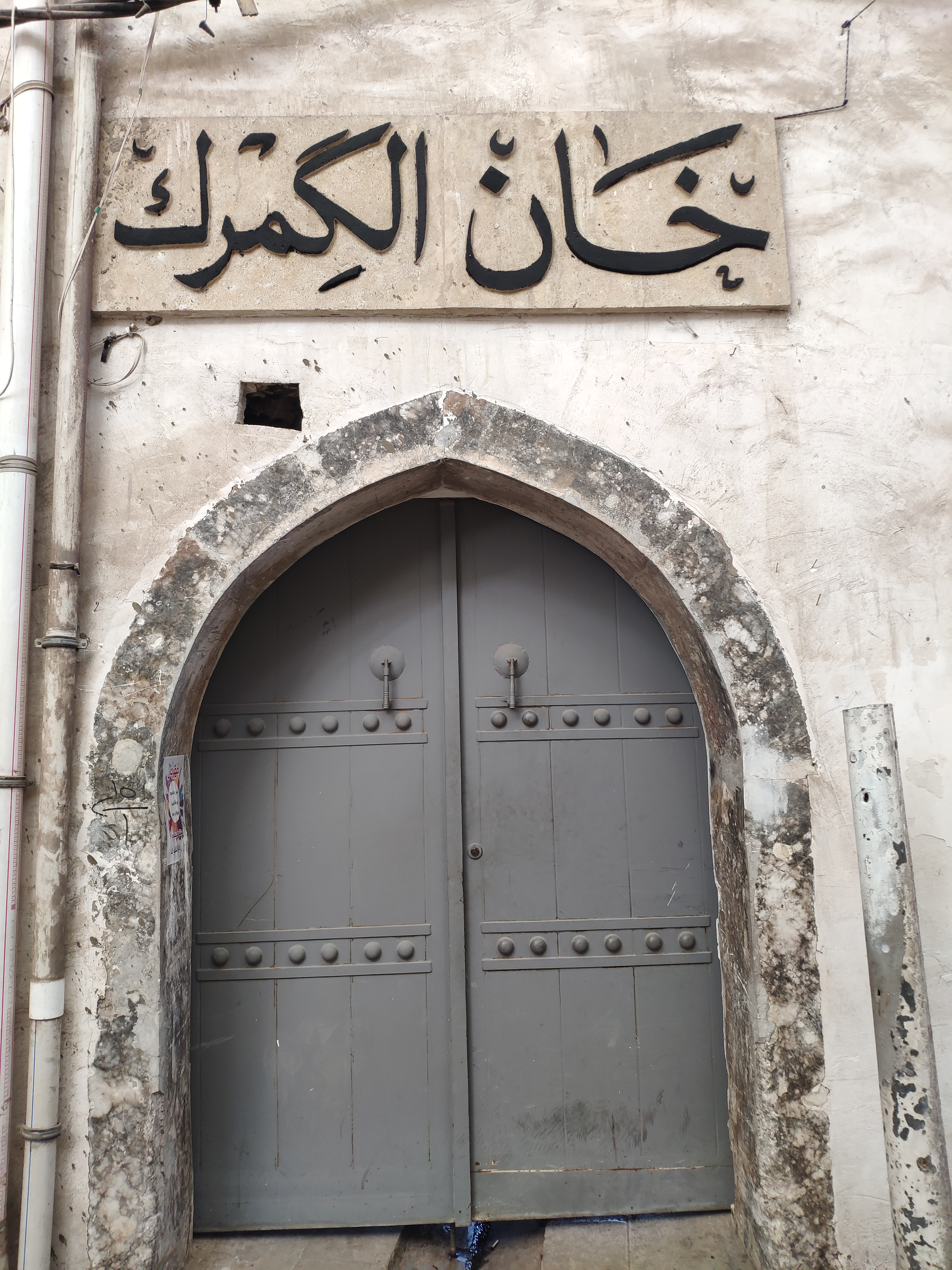
Khan Al-Gumruk.

== Key structures ==
Within the souq there are a number of mosques and khans, including:

- Al-Basha Mosque
- Shaikh Adbal Mosque
- Khan al-Gumruk
- Khan Qasim Agha
