= May 2009 Lahore attack =

Terrorist attack

2009 Lahore bombing
- Location: Lahore, Pakistan
- Date: 27 May 2009
- Attack type: Car bombing, shooting
- Deaths: 35
- Injuries: 250

The 2009 Lahore bombing, a car bomb attack against police headquarters in Lahore, Pakistan on 27 May 2009, killed at least 35 people and injured 250. During the attack gunmen fired on guards then destroyed the emergency response building at the city's police headquarters by detonating their car bomb. Offices used by the Inter-Services Intelligence (ISI) agency nearby also suffered damage. Two individuals were arrested in the immediate aftermath of the attack.

Pakistani accounts from the time of the attack say the three attackers who died in the attack were unidentified. Two of the attackers emerged from the Toyota van used in the attack, and fired on security officials. The driver was not able to breach the boundary of security pylons, before he detonated the bomb. Some eyewitnesses claimed additional terrorists providing cover fire.

== Attribution ==
Authorities immediately blamed the Pakistani Taliban (TTP) for this attack. The Pakistani Taliban later took the responsibility for the attack, calling it a retaliatory step against Pakistan's military operations targeting the TTP in the Swat valley. Hakimullah Mehsud, deputy leader of the TTP to Baitullah Mehsud, called to claim the attack, threatening more operations against government facilities in Lahore, Rawalpindi, Islamabad and Multan, asking people to leave those cities. Another group, Tekreek-e-Taliban Punjab (the Punjabi Taliban), also claimed credit for the attack, but this second claim was never verified.

In the autumn of 2009 Ali Jaleel, from the Maldives, was identified as one of the bombers.
