= Khan al-Gumruk =

Caravanserai in Mosul, Iraq

Coordinates: 36.3445°N 43.1362°E

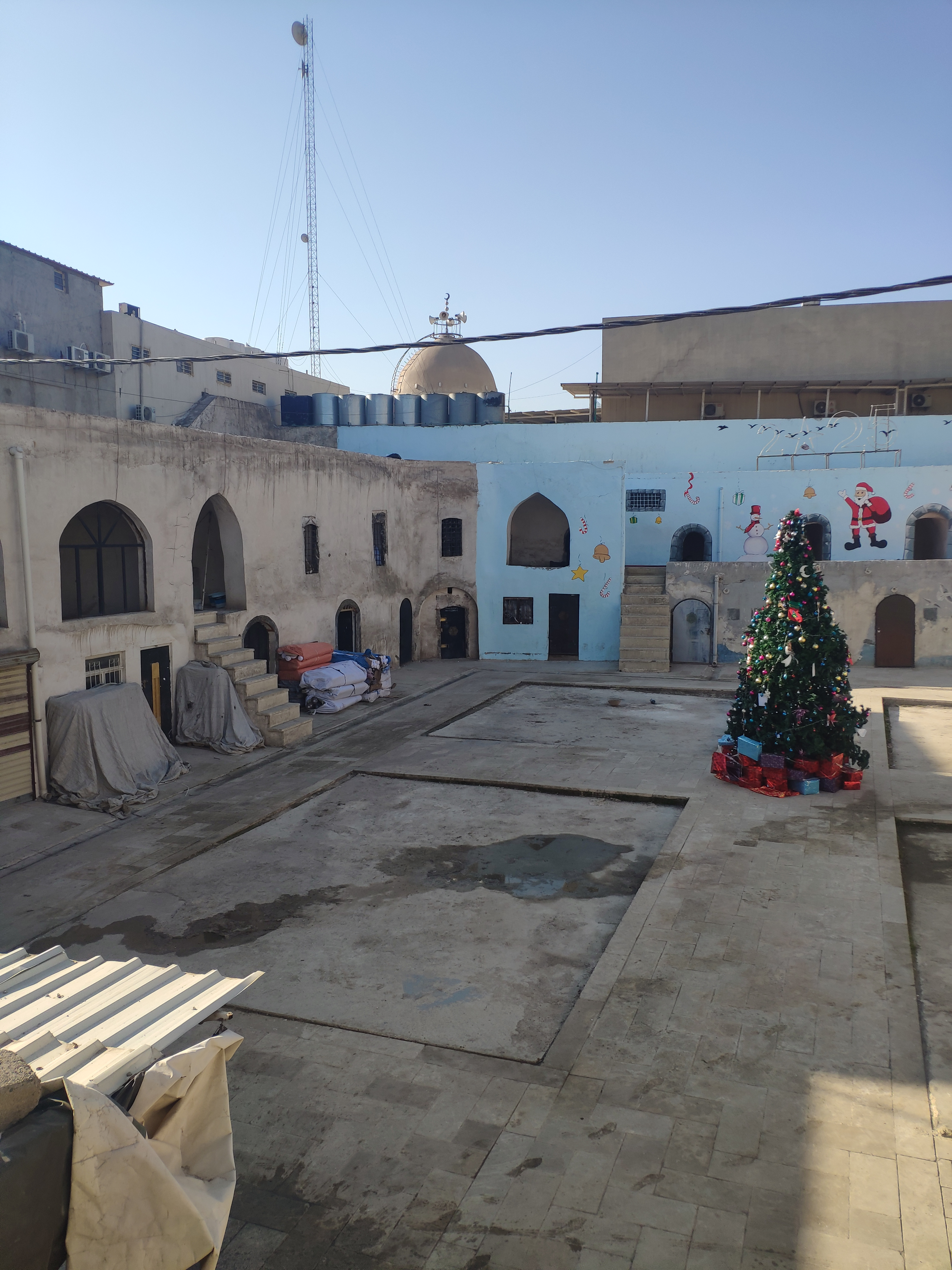
- Interactive map of the Khan al-Gumruk area

General information
- Status: Preserved
- Location: Bab al-Saray, Mosul, Iraq

Technical details
- Floor area: 2

Khan al-Gumruk al-Akbar (Arabic: خان الكمرك الكبير) is an old caravanserai in the Bab al-Saray area of Mosul, Iraq. Dating back to around 1703 during the Ottoman Empire, the caravanserai is surrounded by mosques and several markets of the Bab al-Saray souq such as the Haddadeen Market, the Atami Market, and the Kawazin Market.

The caravanserai is currently located between the Tigris River, and the Bab al-Jisr Square.

== Historical background ==
The caravanserai dates back to the early era of the Jalili dynasty activities in Mosul. Three sons of the first Jalili notable Abdul-Jalili, Isma'il Agha, Ibrahim Agha, and Khalil Agha, established and endowed the caravanserai for their mosque, which later became the Aghas Mosque. Believed to be a place for trading goods, the establishment was a place for registering goods according to the Ottoman tax system.

Khan al-Gumruk is also notable for being one of the only historical sites in Mosul to remain intact in its original form unlike most heritage sites in the city that were destroyed or damaged during the war on ISIS.

== Gallery ==
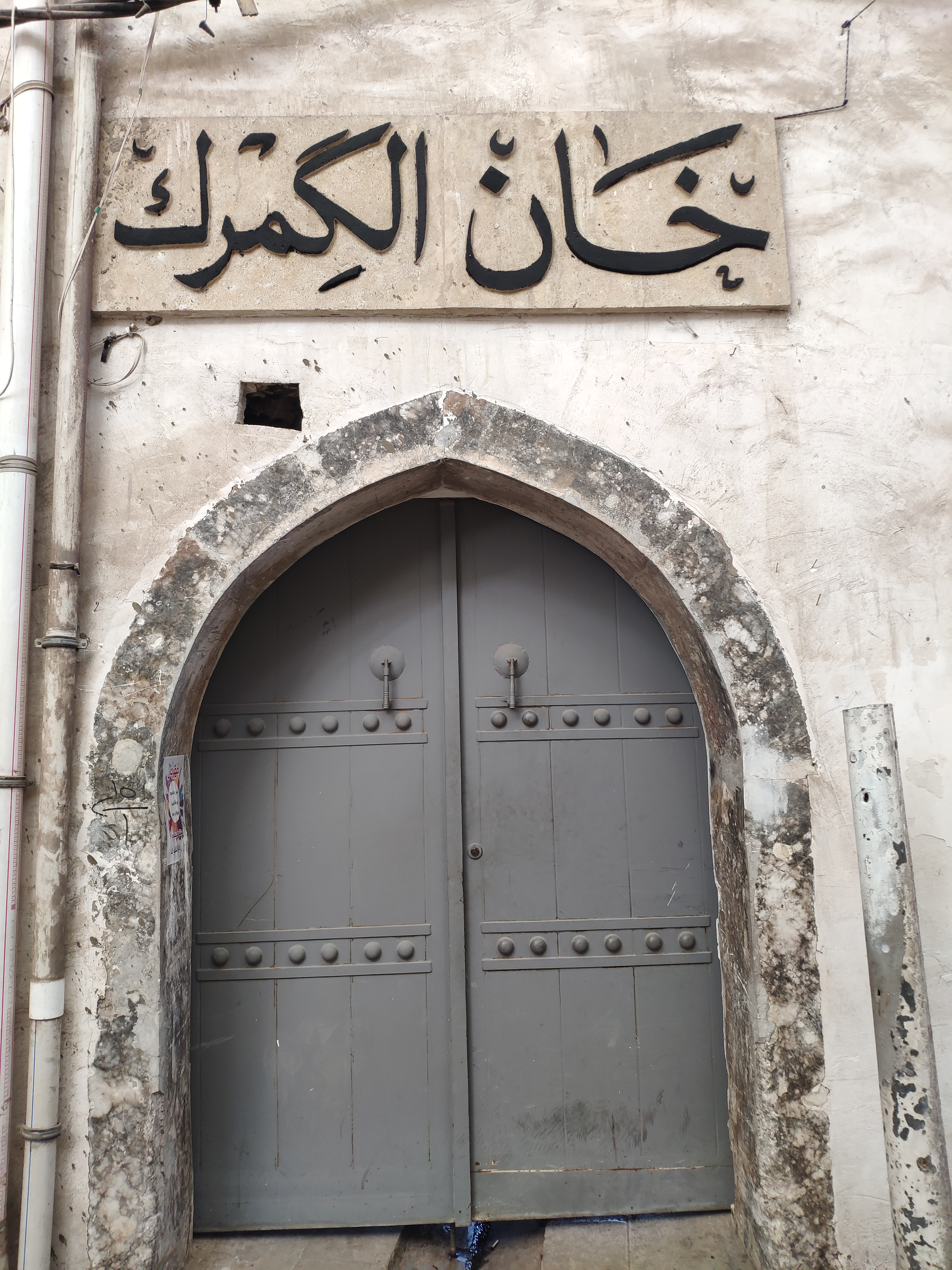
The entrance of Khan al-Gumruk

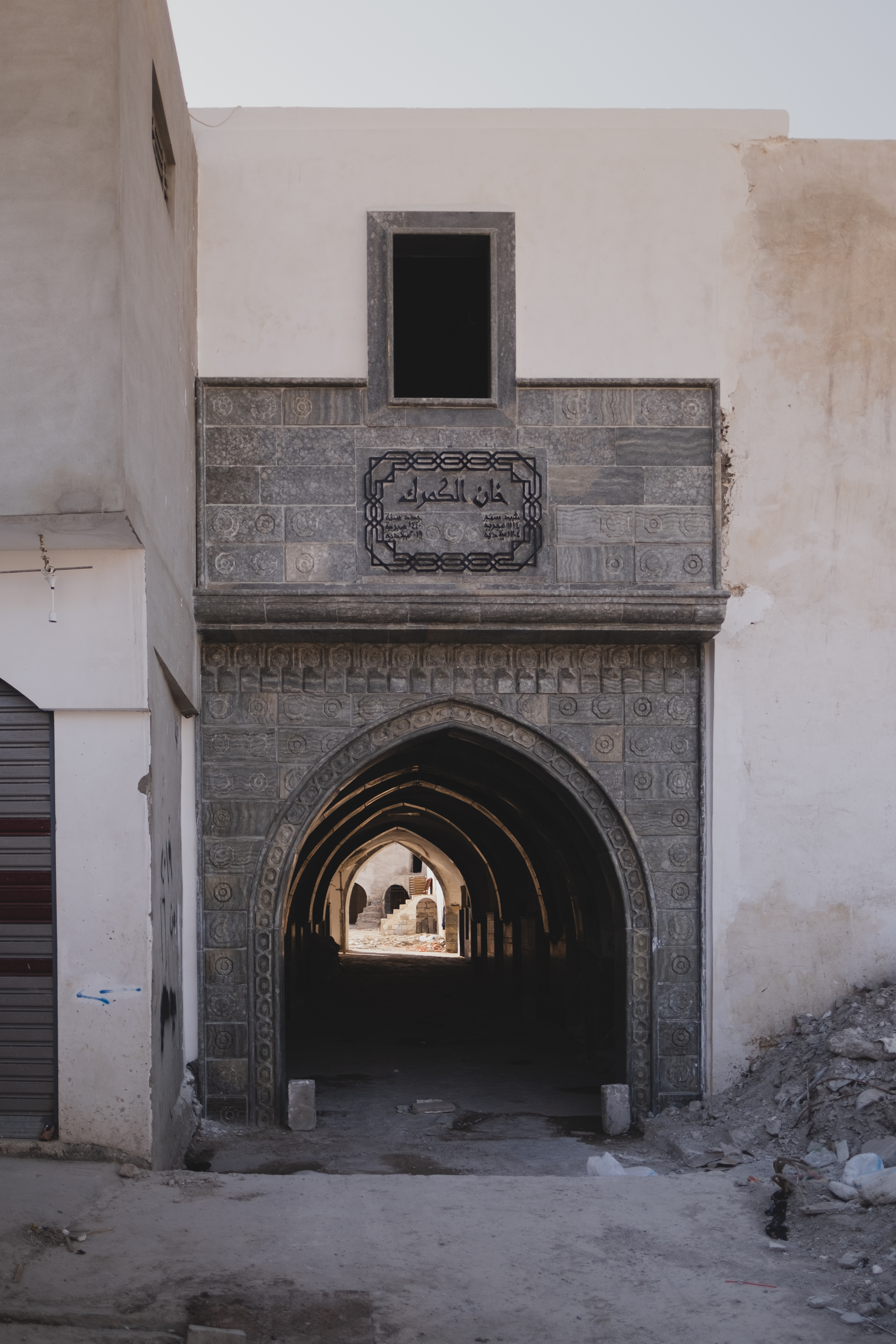
The narrow entrance to the Khan after renovations in 2019

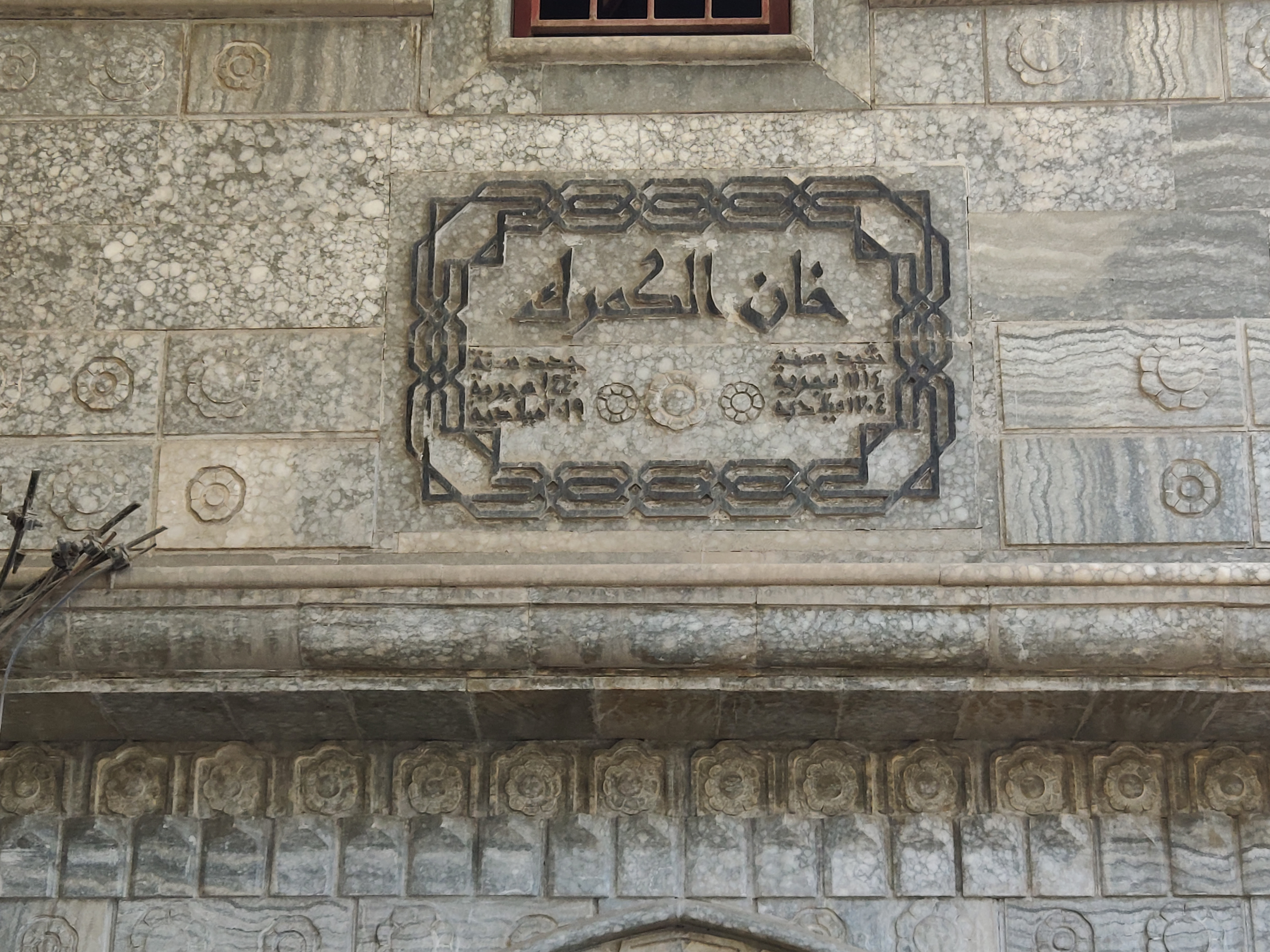
Inscriptions on the caravanserai
