= Al-Basha Mosque =

Mosque in Mosul, Iraq

- جامع الباشا
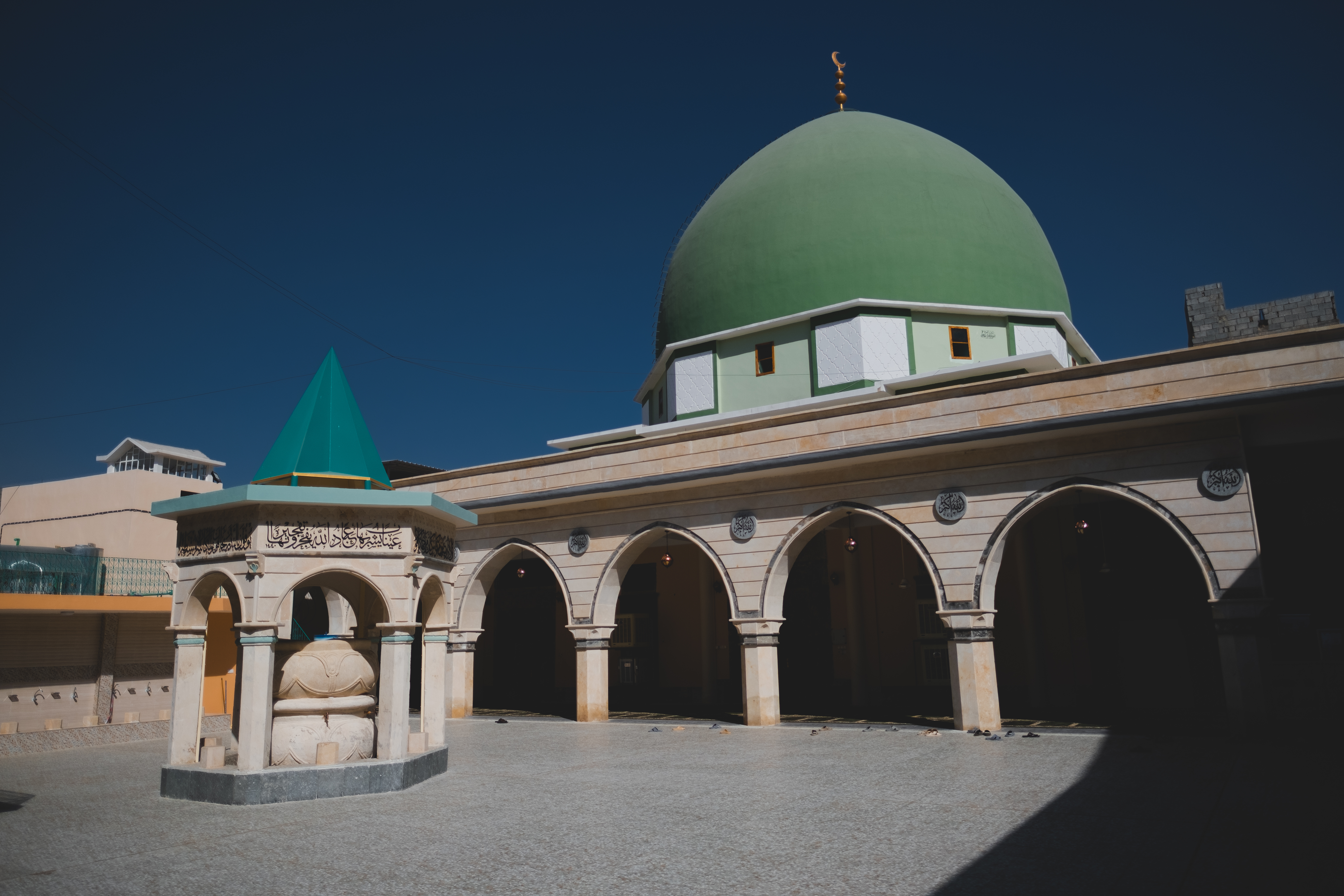
- The mosque in 2019, viewed from the sahn

- Location of the mosque in Iraq

Religion
- Affiliation: Islam
- Ecclesiastical or organizational status: Mosque
- Status: Active

Location
- Location: Bab al-Saray, Mosul
- Country: Iraq
- Interactive map of Al-Basha Mosque
- Coordinates: 36°20′36″N 43°08′10″E

Architecture
- Type: Mosque architecture
- Founder: Jalili dynasty
- Completed: 1169 AH (1755/1756 CE) (original structure); c. 2019 (reconstruction)
- Destroyed: 2014 (by ISIL)
- Dome: One (maybe more)

The Al-Basha Mosque (Arabic: جامع الباشا, lit. 'The Pasha's Mosque'), formerly known as al-Khabazin Mosque (Arabic: جامع الخبازين, lit. 'The Bakers' Mosque'), is a mosque located in the Bab al-Saray area of Mosul, Iraq.

== History ==
The mosque was constructed by Hussein Pasha of al-Jalili dynasty during the Ottoman imperial rule, and was later completed by his son Ghazi Muhammad Amin Pasha in 1169 AH (1755/1756 CE), and later included a madrasa. The family took care of the mosque over time; and several members of the dynasty are buried in the mosque. The mosque is one of the oldest religious buildings established by al-Jalili dynasty.

The mosque was among many that was destroyed by the Islamic State of Iraq and the Levant during their takeover of Mosul in 2014. After ISIS was defeated, the mosque was reconstructed by local sculptors and artists in its original form without government interference. In 2021, prayers and Eid al-Fitr celebrations reopened in the mosque.

== Gallery ==
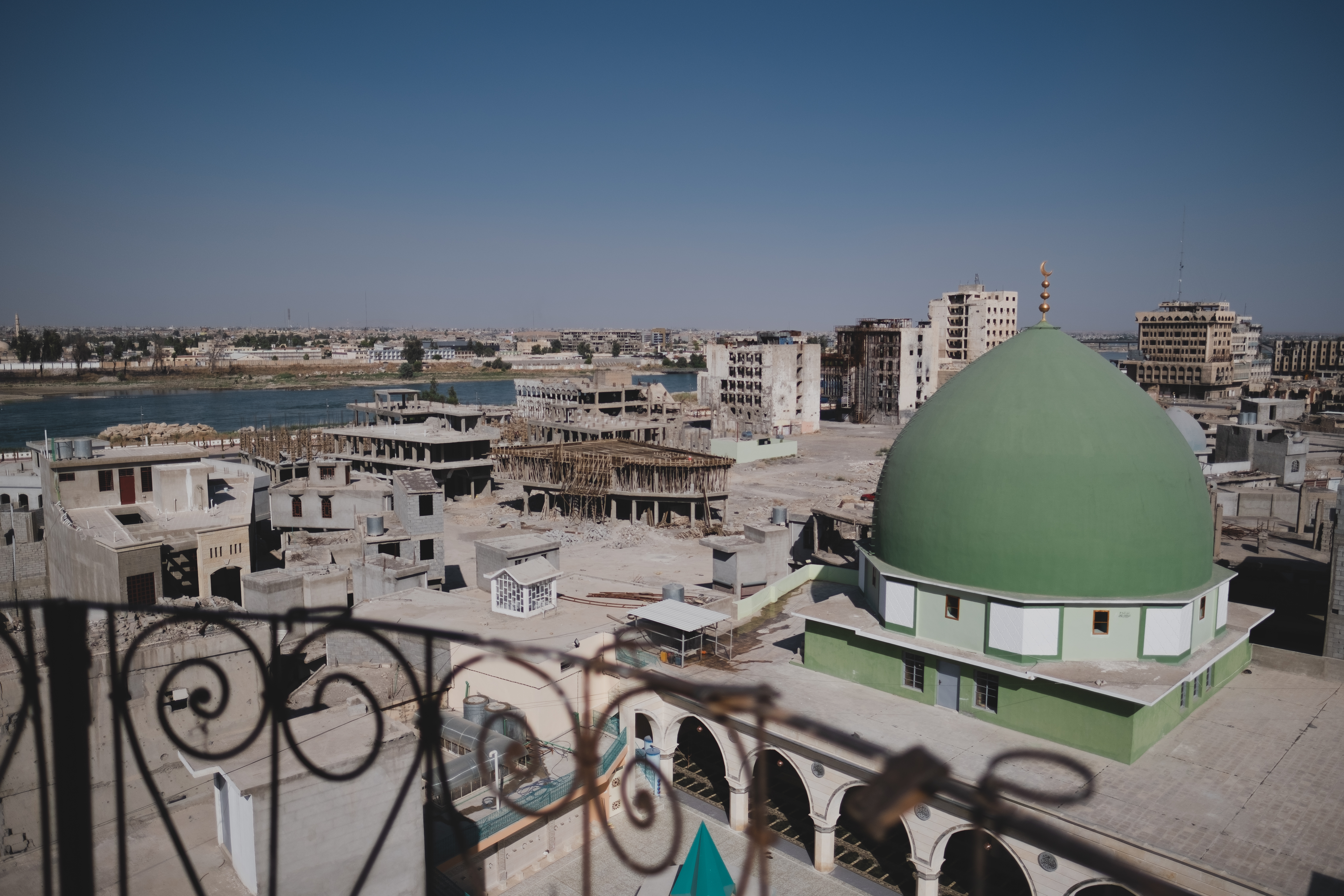
View over the mosque during its reconstruction, 2019

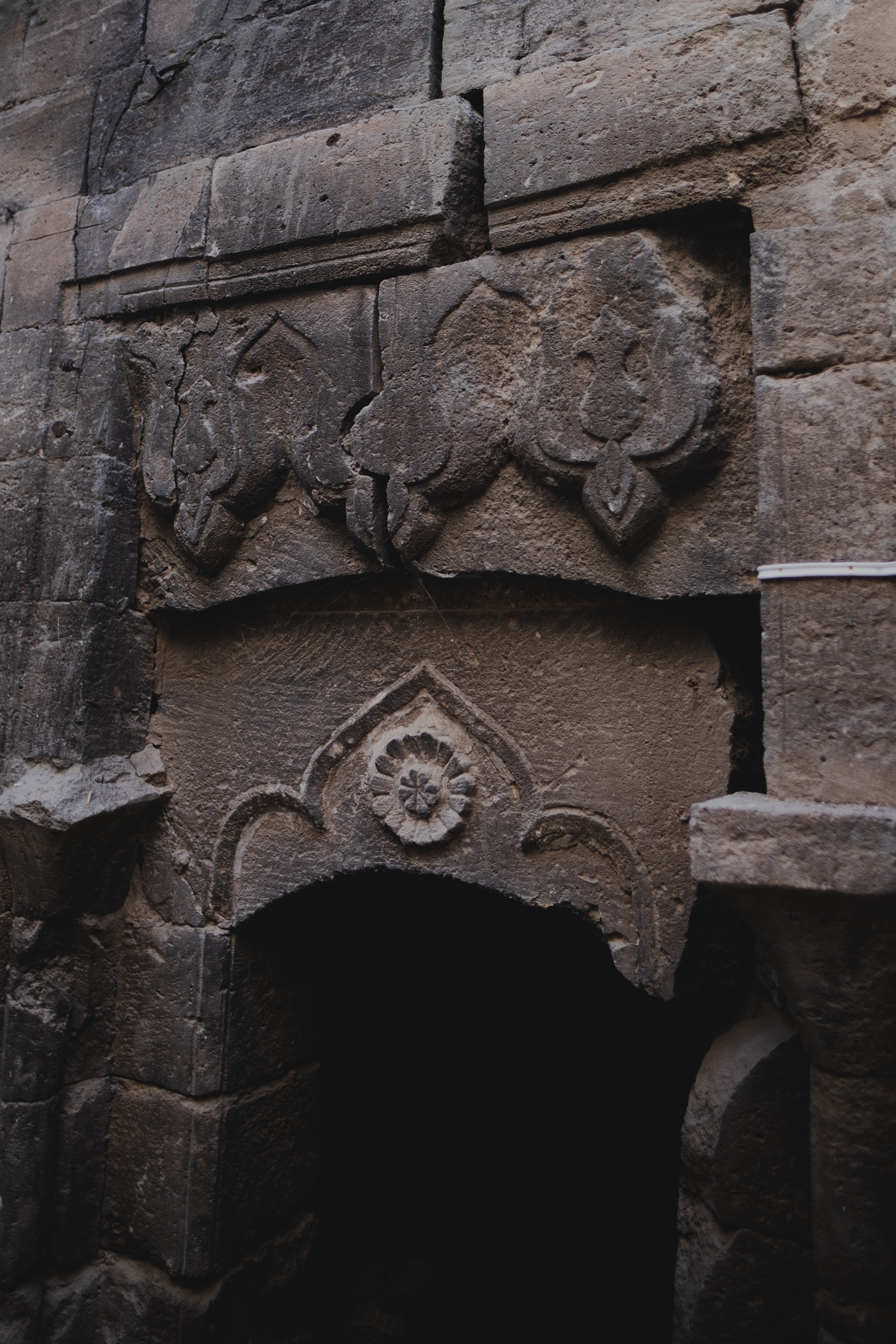
Detail of historic structure, 2019

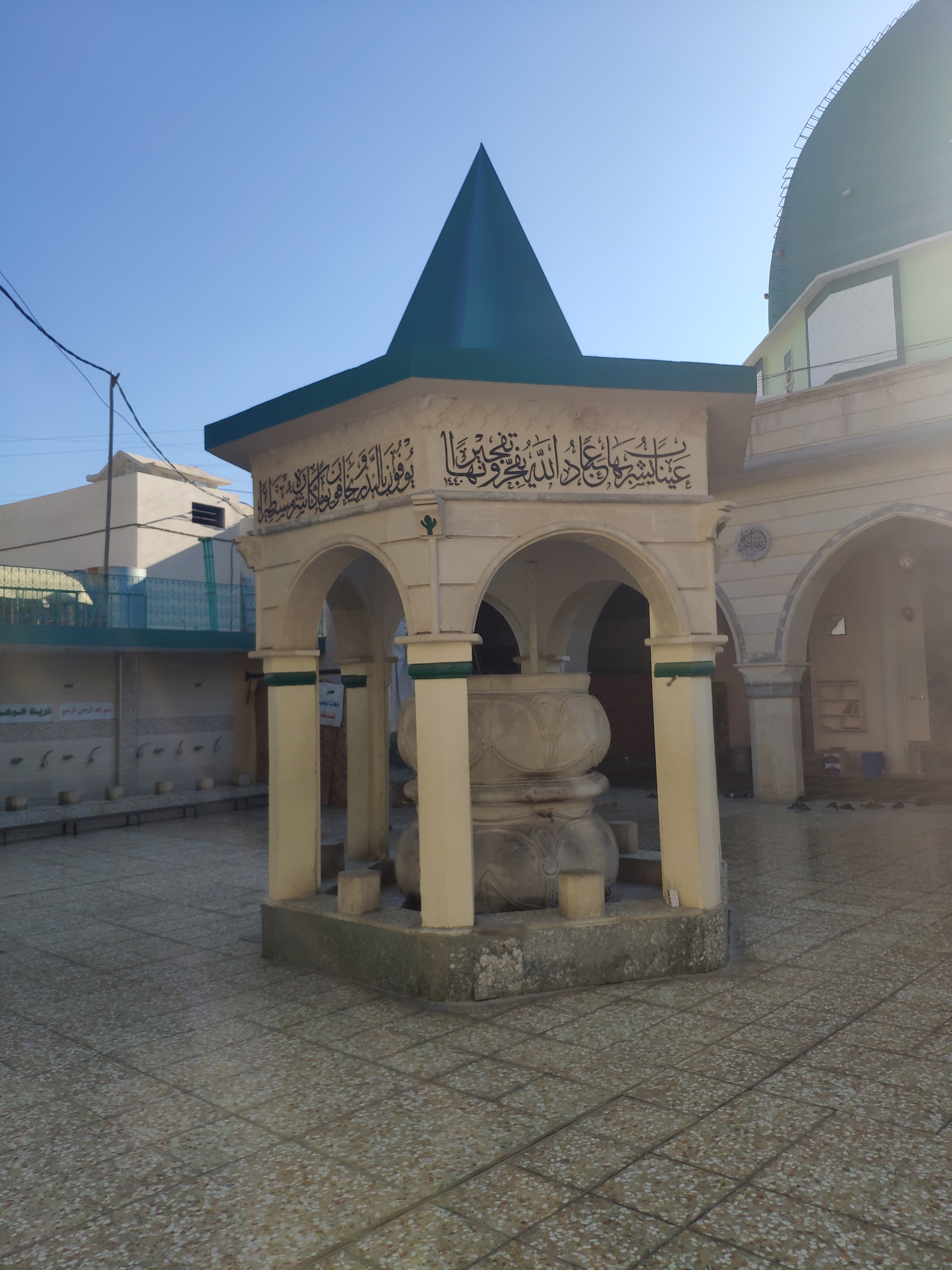
Unusual structure in the sahn

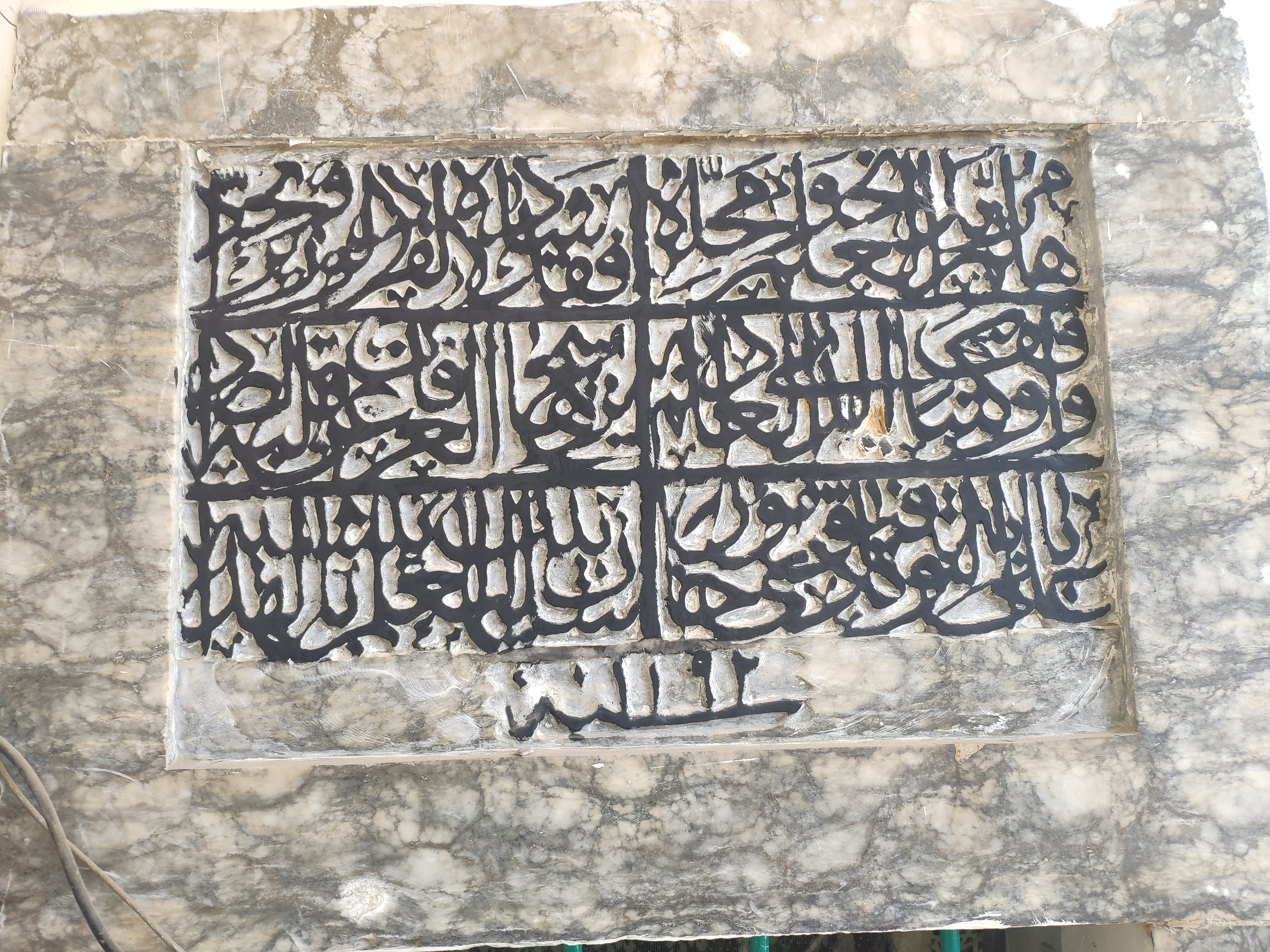
Inscription, 2019

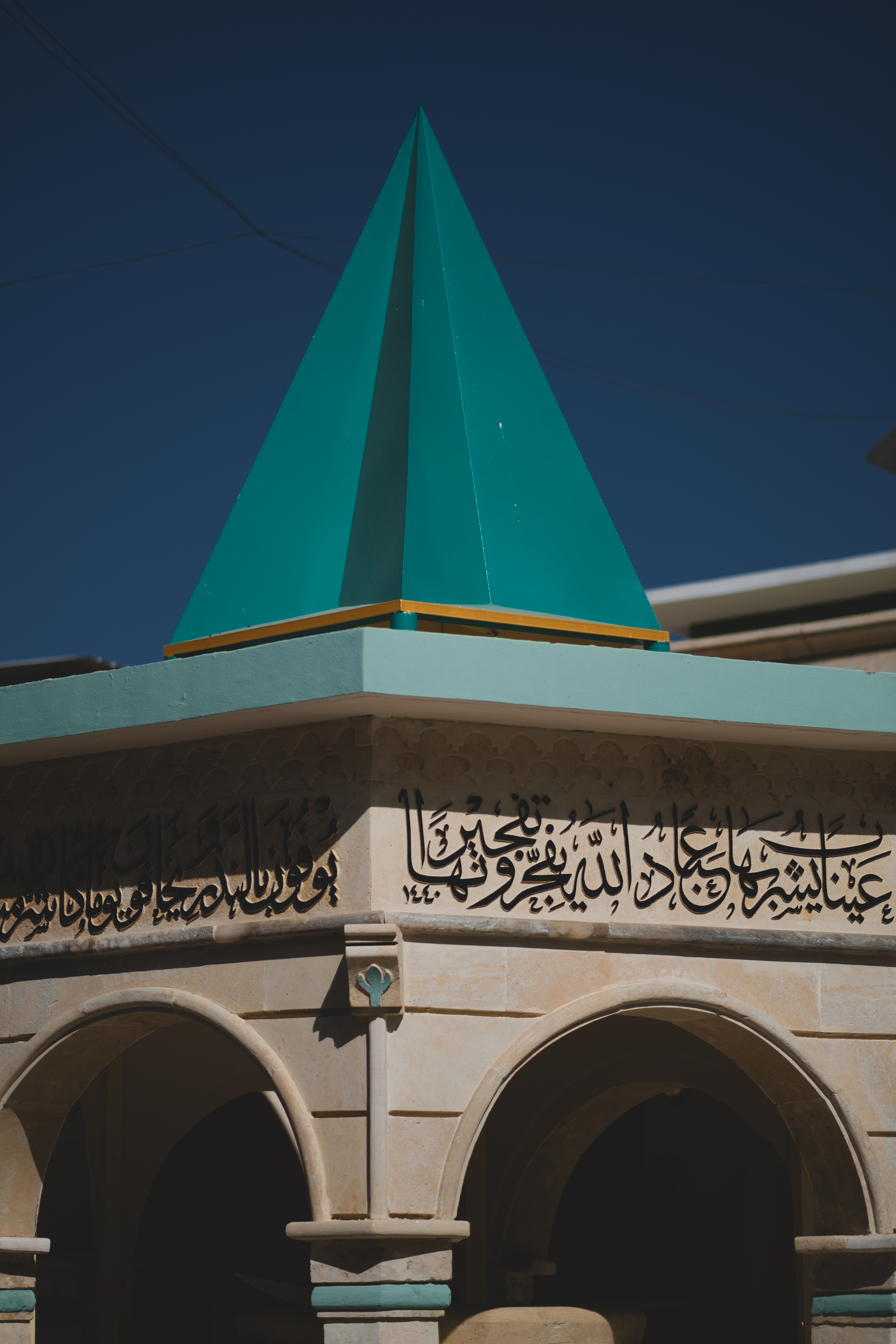
Conical dome and inscriptions, 2019

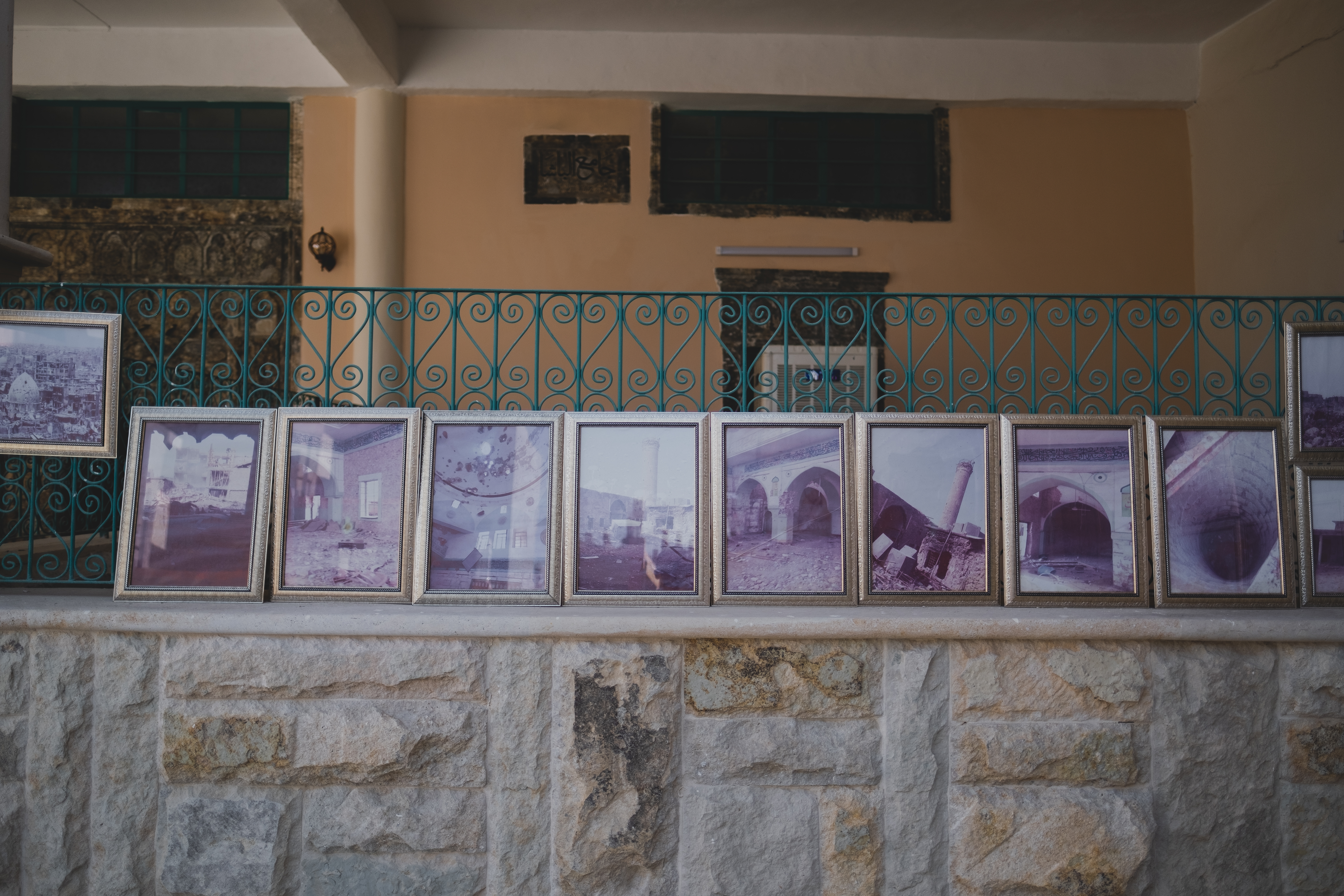
Images of the historic mosque inside the reconstructed mosque, 2019

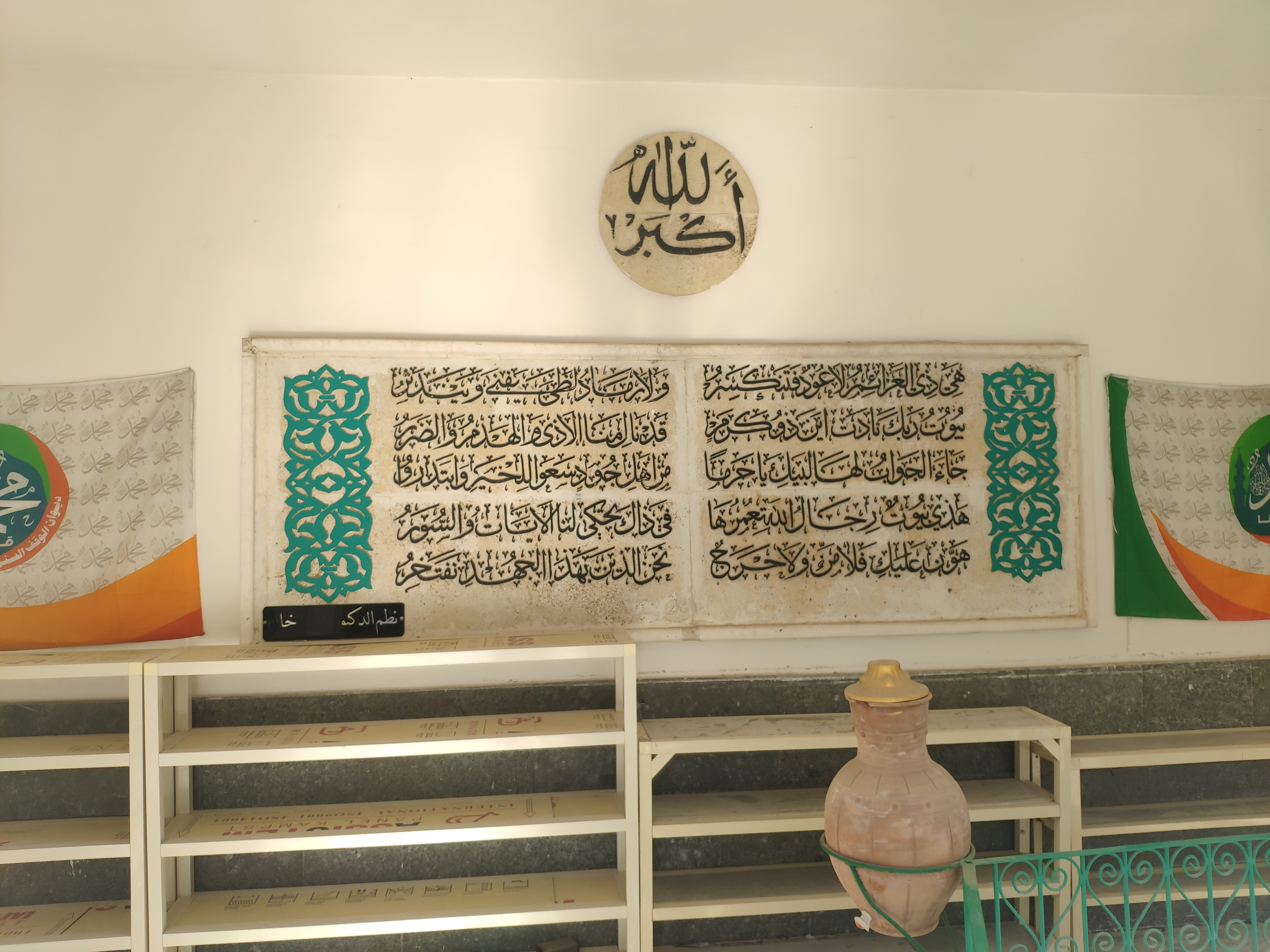
Inside the mosque, 2019

== See also ==
- Destruction of cultural heritage by the Islamic State
- Islam in Iraq
- List of mosques in Iraq
