= Economic D-Day =

2026 United States sanctions and economic isolation campaign against Iran

- Operation Economic Outcast; Part of the 2026 Iran war, Iranian economic, energy, and internal crisis
- Date: 20 August 2026 – present (2 months, 1 week and 2 days)
- Location: Iran and other countries trading with Iran
- Caused by: Stalled ceasefire talks between the United States and Iran; Continued Iranian disruption of shipping through the Strait of Hormuz
- Goals: Isolating the economy of Iran from global trade and finance; Pressuring third countries, including China, to halt purchases of Iranian oil; Targeting more than 60 entities, individuals and vessels tied to Iran
- Methods: Secondary sanctions on countries and financial institutions in the oil, banking, digital assets, technology, gold, aviation and shipping sectors; Sanctions on oil smuggling networks, swap lines, cash transfers, exchange houses, ship registries and front companies; Closure of Bank Melli branches abroad
- Status: Ongoing: Value of Iranian rial falls to record low of 2.5 million per 1 USD; United Arab Emirates suspends trade with Iran

Parties
| United States; Supported by: European Union | Iran |

Lead figures
| Donald Trump; Scott Bessent | Mojtaba Khamenei (WIA); Masoud Pezeshkian; Abbas Araghchi; Mohsen Rezaee |

Economic D-Day, officially designated Operation Economic Outcast by the US Treasury, is the name given by US President Donald Trump and Treasury Secretary Scott Bessent to a campaign of sanctions and economic isolation announced by the United States against Iran in August 2026, amid the ongoing 2026 Iran war. Trump first used the phrase on 19 August 2026, warning that any country doing business with Iran would face "TREMENDOUS [sic] economic consequences". Bessent subsequently described the coming measures as "the single greatest financial offensive ever marshalled against an adversary" and pledged "the toughest sanctions in history," with details unveiled at a press conference on 24 August 2026.

== Background ==
By August 2026, the war between the United States, Israel and Iran had continued for roughly six months without a lasting resolution, and a 60-day window for a ceasefire deal had expired without agreement. The United States had already imposed extensive sanctions on Iran's banking, energy, aviation and cryptocurrency sectors, and had targeted Iran's "shadow oil fleet" and frozen cryptocurrency assets under an earlier initiative referred to as "Operation Economic Fury". On 4 August 2026, Bessent had indicated a deal to reopen the Strait of Hormuz was close, briefly pushing Brent crude down to about $80 per barrel, before the US reverted to a policy of maximum pressure. Iran, for its part, threatened to seize vessels violating transit rules in the Strait of Hormuz, and its top security official Mohsen Rezaee threatened to halt oil flow through the strait entirely should neighbouring countries join the US economic campaign. On 7 August 2026, the Treasury Department had sanctioned Shahr Bank and two Dubai-based exchange houses, Titan Exchange and Alps International, which it alleged had helped Shahr Bank retrieve oil revenue on behalf of major Iranian exporters including the National Iranian Oil Company and Naftiran Intertrade Co., in what officials said was the eighth such Treasury action against Iran since the start of the second Trump administration.

== Announcement ==
On 19 August 2026, Trump wrote on Truth Social that "oil smuggling, swap lines, cash transfers, exchange houses, ship registries, front companies — it all needs to stop NOW," adding that any country allowing its financial institutions, businesses, airports or government entities to provide "any type of lifeline to Iran will itself face TREMENDOUS economic consequences". He wrote that this would be "an ECONOMIC D-DAY," and called on US allies to help "isolate and defeat the Iran threat".

Bessent reinforced the message in a Financial Times opinion piece published on 23 August 2026, writing "at dawn begins an economic D-Day — the single greatest financial offensive ever marshalled against an adversary" and describing the effort as entering its "endgame". He told CNBC the sanctions package would represent the greatest campaign of "coordinated economic isolation in the history of the world" and stated the explicit goal was to "collapse this regime," comparing the intended effect to sanctions previously imposed on Venezuela and Cuba. Bessent said the US would tell allies "you are either with us or against us" and would use its "full might" against countries that continued trading with Iran. The detailed sanctions package was formally unveiled at a Treasury press conference on 24 August 2026.

=== China ===
Analysts noted that squeezing Iran's economy required confronting China, which had been purchasing an estimated 80 to 90 percent of Iran's oil exports before the war, largely through so-called "teapot" refineries. Bessent said Washington had sanctioned smaller Chinese refineries but had not yet taken more escalatory measures against major Chinese banks, and declined to say whether China would be a direct focus of the new measures, noting that "many conversations are best to have in private," ahead of a planned visit to the White House by Chinese leader Xi Jinping the following month.

=== 24 August Treasury press conference: "Operation Economic Outcast" ===
At a Treasury Department news conference on 24 August 2026, Bessent unveiled the new sanctions package under the name "Operation Economic Outcast," expanding the categories of secondary sanctions to cover digital assets, technology, gold, aviation and shipping, which he said Iran used to generate revenue, evade sanctions or otherwise sustain itself. He said the objective was to "sever every economic lifeline that sustains this tyrannical regime until Tehran stands alone," and warned that "those who tether themselves to Tehran should expect to share in the isolation of a withering regime". Bessent stated that "an economic engagement of any kind with this murderous regime will expose those responsible to the full reach of American power," and that "any entity that facilitates money laundering on behalf of Iran will be removed from the U.S. dollar system". He did not name specific countries that could face secondary sanctions, though China, Turkey and the United Arab Emirates were noted as Iran's largest trade partners; when asked whether the initiative would encompass China, Bessent said "no one is above this". Bessent also called for the closure of every branch of the state-owned Bank Melli, Iran's largest bank, which operated branches in about a dozen countries including the United Kingdom and France, saying "every branch of Bank Melli must be shuttered and dark". The Treasury Department said it had identified more than 60 entities, individuals and vessels it was prepared to sanction, and Bessent said Washington was "giving everyone the opportunity to remedy bad behavior," adding "why would I want to blow up the global financial system?" Some sanctions experts questioned how disruptive the measures would prove; Brett Erickson, a Washington-based sanctions consultant, said "this was not economic D-Day... it was something in the middle".

Bessent declined to set a compliance deadline, saying "we do not have infinite patience here," and said he expected an announcement of a major financial institution being sanctioned by the end of the week. He said Trump was personally telephoning world leaders with "specific requests" to cease trading with the Iranian regime. US officials said the expanded secondary sanctions were expected to remain the primary US course of action against Iran at least until after the midterm elections, after which a renewed military campaign could again be considered. Ahead of the announcement, Trump wrote on social media that "IRAN IS COMPLETELY COLLAPSING!!!," and Bessent wrote in his Financial Times op-ed that Trump had "decimated Iran's economy to a point where the rial has never been weaker and inflation has rarely been higher".

The announcement coincided with the Iranian rial hitting a record low, with the rial dropping to 2.05 million to the US dollar on the open market as trading began, compared with an official central bank rate of around 1.5 million rial to the dollar. Days earlier, the United Arab Emirates had announced it was suspending all trade with Iran, one of Iran's largest trading partners and biggest sources of imports.

== Timeline of actions ==
For its relations with Iranian regime Banque Misr in UAE was targeted with secondary sanctions in August 2026.

After 12 years, General License G on August 24 was suspended with Iranian people losing access to international TOEFL, GRE and Duolingo among other things.

On September 4, OFAC sanctioned investment bank Golden Global Yatirim Bankasi Anonim Sirketi based in Istanbul, Turkey.

On September 14, the Treasury Secretary Scott Bessent announced sanctions on VTB Bank over its alleged role in Iranian sanctions evasion. The bank had already been sanctioned in 2022 over the Russian invasion of Ukraine.

On September 17, the FT reported that Mahan Air suspended flights to Muscat and would stop flying to Istanbul and Ankara from September 21. These followed decisions by Turkish and Omani aviation authorities after the US sanctioned 36 targets tied to Iran's aviation sector.

== Central bank ban ==
In October 12 Central bank of Iran blocked banks for four days. The CBI also blocked and banned top 5 exchanges and online platforms.

== Reactions ==
=== Iran ===
Iranian foreign minister Abbas Araghchi dismissed the campaign as "a diversion from America's own crisis: unprecedented debt & surging interest costs," writing on X that "doubling down on failed policies will only bring further defeat — and enmity of Iranians". Iranian state media described the sanctions threat as an "implicit admission of the enemy's humiliating defeat". Iranian president Masoud Pezeshkian said Iran "cannot continue with war forever" and defended a prior agreement reached with the US in June 2026, despite reported misgivings from Iran's supreme leader Mojtaba Khamenei, reflecting apparent divisions within Iran's leadership over how to proceed.

Following the 24 August announcement, Pezeshkian said the government did not deny that Iran faced economic shortages and argued Iran should end the war now, while still in a position of strength. Iranian parliament speaker and chief negotiator Mohammad Bagher Ghalibaf, speaking to Iranian and Iraqi businessmen in Baghdad, said Iran would not be able to sustain its security without a strong economy, stating "no matter how much military power we have, if people are hungry and we don't have financial circulation," the country's position would be undermined. Iranian leadership more broadly sought to downplay the threat of the new measures while also threatening to retaliate against countries that cooperated with the sanctions, even as several senior officials acknowledged the risk of economic collapse was real. Iran's supreme national security council secretary Mohsen Rezaee said "not a single drop of oil will be exported" from anywhere in the Persian Gulf if the US broadened its economic campaign, and warned that Iran would regard any country's participation in or support for the US campaign as "an act of war".

On 26 August, Araghchi wrote a letter to UN secretary-general Antonio Guterres, the Security Council president, and UN member states, demanding a condemnation of the measures and calling them an "economic terrorism campaign". He stated that the US bore the responsibility for the damages caused by unilateral sanctions and demanded compensation encompassing restitution and reparations.

=== Pakistan ===
On 27 August, Pakistan's foreign ministry spokesperson Tahir Andrabi was initially reported to have said that Pakistan was "not obliged" to comply with unilaterally imposed sanctions on Iran unless they were authorized by the UN, highlighting "a desire to expand" trade between the neighbours. He was also reported to have denied the legality of the sanctions and to have called for a resolution of issues through dialogue. Later the same day, however, The News International and Geo News reported a "clarification" on behalf of unspecified authorities, which said that Pakistan neither commented on nor engaged in the interpretation of US sanctions on Iran and remained committed to the negotiations between Washington and Tehran.

=== Markets ===
The threat of new sanctions coincided with turmoil in US financial markets. On 20 August 2026, US crude oil rose from a closing price of $86.20 to $86.70 per barrel while US stocks posted their worst losses in three weeks; the same week, US national debt was reported to have surpassed $40 trillion. By 24 August, Brent crude had risen past $92 per barrel amid anticipation of the sanctions rollout.

=== Experts and analysts ===
The sanctions saw wide criticism by experts at the Atlantic Council. Daniel Fried stated that they were "not an economic death blow", saying that none of them was a game changer. Maia Nikoladze, deputy director at the council's Economic Statecraft Initiative, indicated the possibility of a Chinese retaliation in critical minerals if the US escalated against one of China's financial institutions. Andrew L. Peek, while praising Trump for possessing "a tremendous amount of deterrence", conceded that the implementation of the measures would be challenging and their effects would be limited since Iran was not exporting oil by sea and would attempt to obtain dollars from its neighbours and survive the sanctions. Jonathan Panikoff cited the Gulf states' lack of willingness to isolate Iran, the difficulty of getting China to cut financial ties with Iran, and doubts in the region about whether Trump would show consistency in his policy.

In a written interview with The Chosun Daily, Harvard economist Kenneth Rogoff criticised the sanctions as being likely to accelerate dedollarisation, cause China and Europe to expand their own international financial systems, and make China retaliate against the US with its own leverage in rare earths and pharmaceuticals. His assessment agreed with that of Lesley Chavkin at the Atlantic Council, who noted the possibility of more trade being conducted using non-dollar financial channels inaccessible to the US.

== See also ==
- D-Day (military term)
- International sanctions against Iran
- United States sanctions against Iran
- Economic impact of the 2026 Iran war
