= Punjabi Taliban =

Former Islamist militant group

- Leader: Asmatullah Muawiya
- Dissolved: 2014
- Country: Pakistan
- Active regions: Pakistan (Punjab, Khyber Pakhtunkhwa, Sindh), Afghanistan
- Ideology: Deobandi; Jihadism
- Political position: Far-right
- Wars: Insurgency in Khyber Pakhtunkhwa; War in Afghanistan (2001–2021)

The Punjabi Taliban (Punjabi: پنجابی طالبان), officially called Tehreek-e-Taliban Punjab (تحریک طالبان پنجاب), was a network of Deobandi militant groups in Pakistan active from 2002 until it was dissolved in 2014 by its leader Asmatullah Muawiya. The Punjabi Taliban was mostly made up of Punjabis and was based in Punjab Province, as opposed to the Pakistani Taliban which was dominated by Pashtuns and based in the KPK.

== History ==
The Punjabi Taliban began after former members of LeJ, SSP, JeM and various small groups established a cooperation network. Members of other small terrorist cells were also involved. The Punjabi Taliban did not include the groups mentioned nor all their members, but only the individuals who travelled to Khyber Pakhtunkhwa to participate in the insurgency and later formed this group. In late December 2008, the Punjabi Taliban were described as "patrolling the area [South Waziristan] in pickup trucks mounted with heavy guns and had been firing at drones wherever they spotted them. The vehicles were camouflaged with mud and grass".

The Punjabi Taliban gradually appeared after 2002 as an organised group. Before the Siege of Lal Masjid, the Punjabi Taliban had around 2,000 fighters in South Waziristan District. After the Siege of Lak Masjid, the Punjabi Taliban sent an additional 5,000 fighters to North and South Waziristan. The Pakistani authorities were more concerned with the Punjabi Taliban than they were with the Pashtun TTP, as the Punjabi Taliban had a greater ability to gain influence among the Punjabis. Al-Qaeda supported the Punjabi Taliban and facilitated relations between the Punjabi Taliban and the Afghan Taliban. Later, the ISI pressured al-Qaeda to stop supporting the Punjabi Taliban.

The Punjabi Taliban reportedly had strong relations with the TTP, the Afghan Taliban, TNSM and various other groups based in the NWFP and FATA. They were a mixed Salafi and Deobandi group. They were also active in their native Punjab where they attacked Ahmadi, Shia, Sufi, and other targets. The Punjabi Taliban had some foreign mujahideen in it as well.

Although the Punjabi Taliban were an established and active militant group, the Government of Punjab denied their existence. Shahbaz Sharif, the then chief minister of Punjab, stated that the term "Punjabi Taliban" was an "insult to the Punjabis" and accused Rehman Malik of creating the term for ethnic purposes. At the crime scene of the assassination of Shahbaz Bhatti, pamphlets were found that proved the existence of the Punjabi Taliban.

Although the Punjabi Government denied their existence, the Pakistani Government and Lahore Police acknowledged them and blamed them for the attack on the Sri Lankan cricket team. The Punjabi Taliban claimed responsibility for the 2009 Chakwal mosque bombing and the 2010 Ahmadiyya mosques massacre. The Punjabi Taliban and the TTP both claimed responsibility for the 2009 Lahore bombing.

On 24 August 2013, the TTP and Punjabi Taliban had disagreements on whether to accept the Pakistani government's offers for peace talks. Asmatullah Muawiya, defended his argument by stating that the Punjabi Taliban and its Shura are completely separate from the TTP and their Shura and that the Punjabi Taliban was free to decide their own leadership and other matters. Eventually, both the TTP and the Punjabi Taliban decided to participate in peace talks with the Pakistani government. On December 25, 2013, the US drone strikes in Pakistan were temporarily halted so that the Pakistani government can have peace talks with both the TTP and Punjabi Taliban. However, days after the 2014 Jinnah International Airport attack, the US launched a drone attack killing 4 IMU militants and 2 Punjabi Taliban militants in a village near Miranshah, ending the peace talks. On 13 September 2014, Muawiya announced that the Punjabi Taliban was leaving Pakistan to focus on fighting American soldiers in neighbouring Afghanistan. They later returned to Pakistan and dissolved shortly after. After the dissolution of the group, its leader Asmatullah Muawiya stated that he hopes to see the Sharia become the official law of Pakistan one day.

== See also ==
- Tajik Taliban
