= Muhammed Amin Andrabi =

Member of Andrabi Sayyed family

Muhammad Amin Andrabi (1940 in Srinagar, Kashmir – 29 December 2001) was a member of the prominent Andrabi Sayyed family. He was the son of the Sufi shaykh and a religious scholar Mir Ahmad. He belonged to the Traditionalist School of metaphysics, inspired by authors like Ibn Arabi, Muhammad Iqbal, Frithjof Schuon, Seyyed Hossein Nasr and Henry Corbin.

Andrabi was schooled at the Islamia High School, Kashmir's first modern school. He had an early proclivity for languages and learned English, Arabic, Persian and Urdu in school. He earned his doctorate in Urdu from the University of Kashmir, studying under one of South Asia's most eminent 20th-century Urdu scholars, Aal-e-Ahmad Suroor. He was also instructed in Islamic history, law and philosophy by his father.

Andrabi began his career as a teacher in the Islamia College of Science and Commerce in Srinagar, where he taught Urdu literature. In 1980 he joined the University of Kashmir as a professor. From the mid-1980s until his death he headed the university's Iqbal Institute, a research center where scholars pursue doctoral studies. There, Andrabi supervised and guided doctoral research in literature, criticism, philosophy, linguistics, history and comparative religion.

He was an authority on Urdu literature and is remembered for his contributions to literary criticism, comparative religion and Islamic philosophy. He authored two books and has been published in several literary journals worldwide.
