= Jalili =

Jalili (Persian: جلیلی, Arabic: جليلي) is a Persian and Arabic surname. Notable Iranian people with the surname include:

- Abolfazl Jalili (born 1957), Iranian film director
- Omid Djalili (born 1965), British-Iranian comedian and actor
- Saeed Jalili (born 1965), Iranian politician

The name also applies to the Iraqi Jalili or al-Jalili family (Arabic: الجليلي).
