= Mir Mirak Andrabi =

16th century Kashmiri Sufi

Syed Mir Mirak Andrabi
- سید میر میرک اندرابیؒ
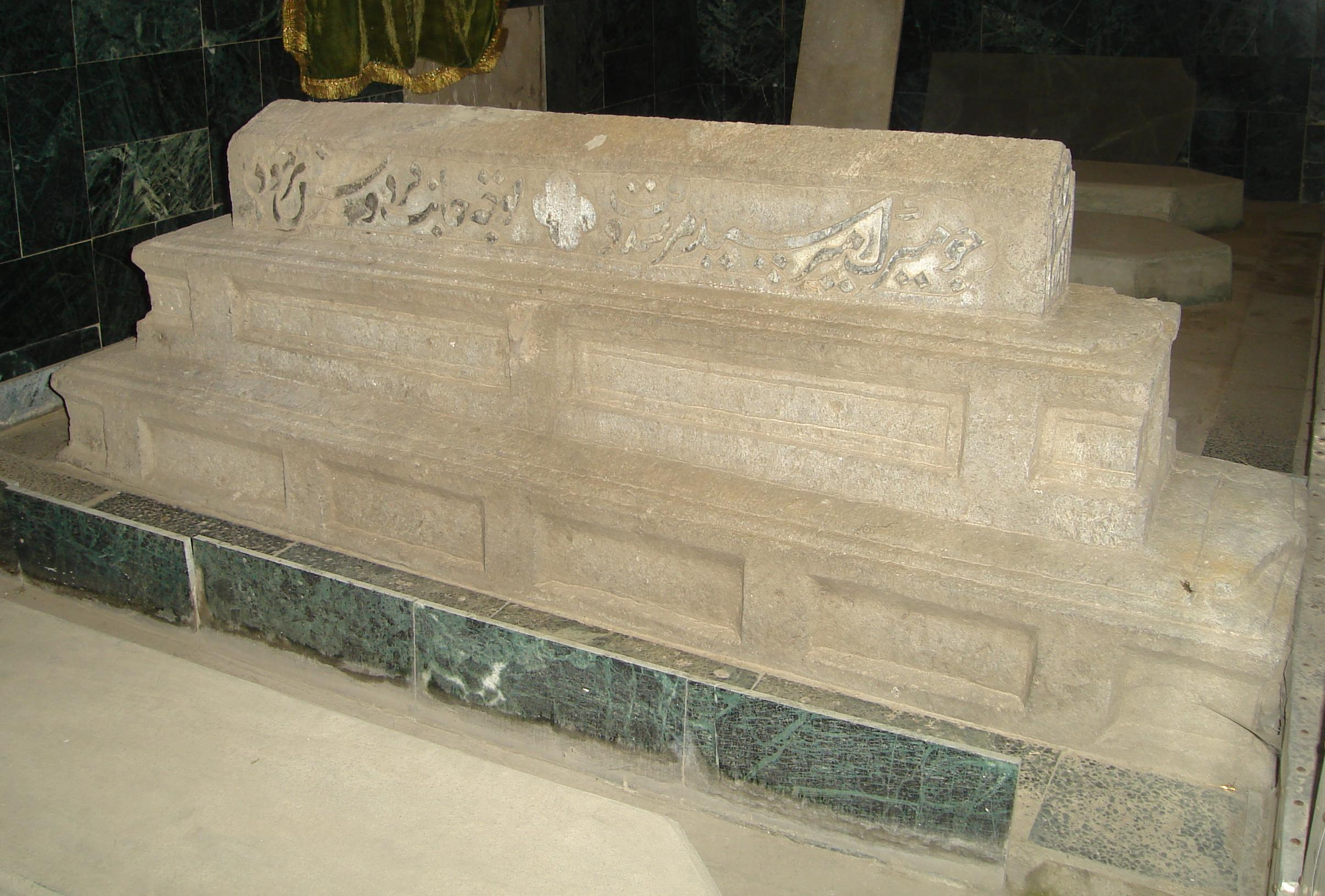
- Title: Sanad-ul-Arifeen

Personal life
- Born: 921 AH (c. 1515 AD) Malaratta, Srinagar, J&K
- Died: 990 AH (c. 1582) Srinagar, Kashmir
- Resting place: Khanqah-e-Andrabia, Malaratta, Srinagar, Kashmir

Religious life
- Religion: Islam
- Denomination: Sunni
- Tariqa: Qadiriyya, Uwaisi

Muslim leader
- Based in: Kashmir

Mir Mirak Andrabi (921-990 AH; c. 1515–1582 AD) was a Sufi scholar in South Asia. The son of Shams-ud-din Andrabi (860-932 AH, c. 1455–1525), his great-grandfather Ahmad Andrabi was originally from Andarab, a valley in a Province of Afghanistan. His clan to Kashmir are known as Andrabi. His Khanqah-e-Andrabia is located at Malaratta (Malla Iraqi Hatta).
