= Djalil =

Djalil may refer to:

== Given name ==
- Djalil Narjissi (born 1980), Moroccan rugby union footballer
- Djalilou Ouorou (born 1997), Beninese footballer

== Surname ==
- Tjut Djalil (1927–2014), Indonesian film director and screenwriter

== Places ==
- Oum El Djalil, a town and commune in Médéa Province, Algeria

== See also ==
- Dalil (disambiguation)
- Jalil (disambiguation)
