= Dalil =

Dalil may refer to:

== Given name ==
- Dalil Benyahia (born 1990), Algerian-Swedish footballer
- Dalil Boubakeur (born 1940), Algerian physician and scholar

== Surname ==
- Suraya Dalil (born 1970), Afghan physician and politician

== Places ==
- Khal Dalil, a village in Kani Bazar Rural District, West Azerbaijan Province, Iran
- Sidi M'Hamed Dalil, a town and commune in Chichaoua Province, Morocco
