= Tábata Jalil =

Mexican television host

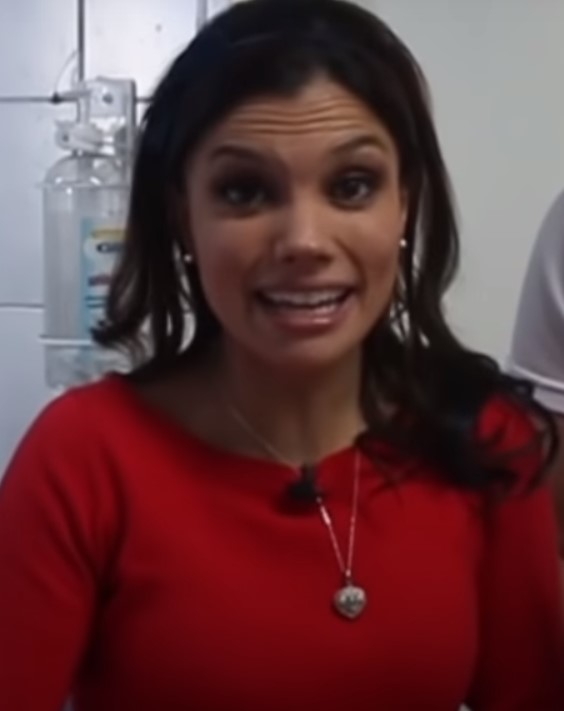
- Tábata Jalil in 2017
- Born: Tábata Concepción Jalil Fernández; May 3, 1979 (age 47); Mexico City, Distrito Federal, Mexico
- Other name: Tabatita
- Occupation: Television host
- Years active: 1998-

Tábata Jalil (born Tábata Concepción Jalil Fernández on June 3, 1979) is a host of the morning television shows El empujón (The push) and Venga la alegría (May happiness come) on TV Azteca in Mexico. She began with TV Azteca in 1998, becoming popular through special reports on various morning programs. Since then she has been called one of the most beautiful television personalities. In 2011, she appeared in a bikini shot on the men’s magazine H para Hombres.

== Career ==
Jalil began her media career with TV Azteca in 1998, as a reporter with the show A quien corresponda, (To whom it may concern) hosted by Jorge Garralda. However, she became popular through her special reports on morning shows. She has collaborated with programs such as Asignación Especial (Special Assignment) and has appeared on television commercials, coming to be called one of the most beautiful and sexy television personalities of TV Azteca and even in Mexico.

At present she appears on the El empujón and Venga la alegría morning shows as a host. She came to the latter one after completing a special news assignment, which led to an audition for the show. In 2010, she accused co-workers on the show of sexual harassment in an interview with TVnotas, stating she had received indecent proposals.

In 2011, Jalil appeared in a bikini shot on a Los Cabos beach for the Revista H para Hombres, a men’s magazine.

== Personal life ==
Born in Mexico City, she spent a number of years in Spain growing up, but returned to Mexico to study communications at the School of Political and Social Science of UNAM.

She was a gymnast for 15 years, is noted for her love of extreme sports and social work. She described herself as “hyperactive” and a work-a-holic, and says she loves extreme sports such as surfing, skiing, rock climbing and skydiving for the adrenaline rush.

== See also ==
Los modelitos de Tábata Jalil
