= Jalil Khazal =

Iraqi poet

- Born: 1 January 1960 (age 66); Baghdad, Iraq
- Occupations: Poet, writer, researcher

Jalil Khazal (Arabic: جليل خزعل; born 1 January 1960) is an Iraqi poet, writer and researcher specializing in literature and child education. Born in Baghdad, he has written more than 80 books for children and has composed tens of songs, theater plays, cartoons and animated films, shows, radio programs and television programs for children.

== Education ==
Khazal received a master's degree in Education and Psychology from the College of Education, University of Baghdad.

== Career ==
Khazal began publishing in the mid-1970s, and was writing thoughts, poems and stories for adults which were published in several local newspapers and magazines. Daily newspapers then allocated sections for children, so Jalil sent one of his poems, which was quickly published. His poems were read on a television program that was about reading the daily newspapers. Khalil was encouraged and sent another poem, which was also published, which earned him a permanent place for writing in the children's sections. Hussein Qadroui had also sung one of Khazal's poems on TV, which was his start with children's songs. Two of his poems were also chosen to be included in the school curriculum for the primary stage, so he started specializing in writing for children. After graduating from university, he worked in teaching and was appointed editor at the Children's Culture House, after which he climbed the ranks until he got promoted and became editor-in-chief.

Khazal has published several children's books in the fields of poetry, stories, illustrated stories and scientific books, in addition to dozens of research papers, studies and press articles regarding children's literature and culture. He has also written dozens of songs, plays, animated films, and radio and television series.

Khazal was managing editor of the magazine Majalati for children at the Children's Culture House in Baghdad, Habibi magazine and director of the publishing department in the same house, and Mizmar magazine.

He also supervised the children's section in the Iraqi magazine IMN, issued by the Iraqi Media Network Al Iraqiya. He also became the head of the Children's Literature Club in the General Union of Writers and Writers in Iraq, as well as the Research and Studies Department at the Institute of Music Studies of the Department of Musical Arts in the Iraqi Ministry of Culture. He is the founder and an official of the Childhood Research Unit at the House of Wisdom in Baghdad.

As an academic, he worked as a lecturer for children's literature in the Kindergarten Department of the College of Education for Girls at the University of Baghdad, and his texts are taught in the curriculum of kindergarten and primary stages, institutes and universities in Iraq and other Arab countries.

Khazal has won many local and Arab awards for his literary works for children. His works have been printed in most countries of the Arab world, and have been translated into English, German, Italian, Kurdish, Persian and Japanese. He was chosen among three distinguished poets in the world in 2018, and three of his poems were published in the book The Year of the Poet 2018 in the United States after being translated into English.

== Memberships ==
- Member of the Union of Iraqi Writers and Writers
- Member of the Iraqi Journalists Syndicate
- Member of the Union of Arab Writers and Writers
- Member of the Union of Arab Journalists
- Member of the International Federation of Journalists
- Member of the Iraqi Teachers Syndicate
- Member of the Iraqi Musicians Union
- Member of the National Committee for Education
- Member and founder of the Iraqi Centre for Children's Culture, Baghdad

== Awards and honours ==
Khazal is the record holder in the number of creativity awards granted by the Ministry of Culture in Iraq.

- First Prize, Child Song Contest, Baghdad, 1977
- First Prize, Child Welfare Authority, Children's Poetry, Baghdad, 1994
- Creativity Award in Children's Literature, Ministry of Culture, Baghdad 1998
- Creativity Award in Children's Literature, Ministry of Culture, Baghdad 1999
- Creativity Award in Children's Literature, Ministry of Culture, Baghdad 2000
- Creativity Award in Children's Literature, Ministry of Culture, Baghdad 2001
- Silver Award, Cairo International Festival, 2002, for a group of songs and animated films
- First Prize, Competition of the First Martyr Muhammad Baqir Al-Sadr, Children's Poetry, 2008
- Children's Poetry Award, House of Cultural Affairs, Ministry of Culture, 2012
- First prize, competition of the Arab Theater Authority in Sharjah, competition for writing theatrical text directed to the child, 2013, for his text The Gift of the Bird
- Best Words and Poems Award, Al Husseini Little Festival for the Fifth Child Theater, Karbala, 2019
- First Prize, Animation Forum, Cairo, 2019, for the movie The Dream of Olives (Khazal wrote the lyrics of his songs.)
- Second prize, English Language Olympiad, Amman, 2019, for the Mermaid play

== Books authored ==
Number	Book	Publication date	Publisher	Number of pages	ISBN	Notes	Source
1	Microscope (Arabic: mujhar)	1986	Children's Culture House	22			
2	Rainbow Series: Part 1: How We Grow (Arabic: silsilat qaws qazah: aljuz' 1: kayf nanmu)	1995	"Dar Al-shams” “Dar Al-Jeel for printing, publishing and distribution”				
3	Rainbow Series: Part 2: One Day (Arabic: silsilat qaws qazah: j 2: yawm min al'ayaam)	1995	"Dar Al-shams" “Dar Al-Jeel for printing, publishing and distribution”				
4	Birds (Arabic: easafir)	1995	Children's Culture House	31			
5	The Most precious thing I have (Arabic: 'aghlaa ma eindi)	1996	Children's Culture House	31			
6	Rainy Cloud (Arabic: alghayma almatira)	1996	Children's Culture House				
7	The tale of the mouse sesame (Arabic: hikayat alfar simsam)	1998 2013	"Child World Development Foundation"	30		Nadim Mohsen's drawings	
8	Maha's birthday (Arabic: eid milad maha)	2000	"Child World Development Foundation"				
9	Hanan	2001	Arab Writers Union				
10	We sing and count (Arabic: nughniy wa nahsib)	2002					
11	Personal Photo (Arabic: sura shakhsia)	2002	"Al Khansa Printing Company”				
12	Sing and love (Arabic: ghanu wahib)	2002	"Al Khansa Printing Company”				
13	Our beautiful anthems (Arabic: 'anashiduna aljamila)	2002	"Al-Ula Press"	32			
14	Engineering family (Arabic: eayilat alhandasa)	2002	"Al Khansa Printing Company”				
15	For better health and growth (Arabic: lsht w nmwin 'afdal)	2003	" Italian Terre des Hommes”				
16	For better breastfeeding (Arabic: min 'ajl ridaea 'afdal)	2003	" Italian Terre des Hommes”				
17	Where has my shadow fled? (Arabic: 'ayn harab zali?)	2004	"Dar Al-kitab Al-hadith”				
18	Foxes and the sea monster (Arabic: thuelub wawahsh albahr)	2004	"Dar Al-kitab Al-hadith”				
19	I'm a Muslim (Arabic: 'ana Muslim)	2004	"Dar Al-kitab Al-hadith”	30			
20	The lost gift (Arabic: alhadia almafquda)	2004	"Dar Al-kitab Al-hadith”	23		Illustrated by Atheer Sate, coloring by Lama Abbas	
21	The locust and the bee (Arabic: aljarada walnahla)	2004	"Dar Al-kitab Al-hadith”	40		Illustrated by Bashar Khawam, coloring by Lama Abbas	
22	Who will play with me? (Arabic: man sayaleab maei?)	2004	"Dar Al-kitab Al-hadith”			Illustrated by Atheer Sate	
23	The khaki duck (Arabic: albata kaky)	2004	"Dar Al-kitab Al-hadith”			Illustrated by Riyad Jalil	
24	The tournament cup (Arabic: kas albutula)	2005	"Lana" Association				
25	The cities cubs (Arabic: 'ashbal almadina)	2005	"Lana" Association				
26	The perfect team (Arabic: alfariq almithaliu)	2006	"Lana" Association				
27	Real friends (Arabic: al'asdiqa' alhaqiqiuwn)	2006	"Lana" Association				
28	The useful lesson (Arabic: aldars almufid)	2006	"Lana" Association				
29	We sing with the rooster (Arabic: nughni mae aldiyk)	2006	"Oma Organization"				
30	Thank you, thank you merciful (Arabic: hmdan, hmdan ya rahman)	2006	"Dar Al-hada’iq”				
31	A drop of water tells its story (Arabic: qatrat ma' tarwi hikayataha)	2007	"Ministry of Sports and Youth”				
32	Our rights (Arabic: huququna)	2007	"Ministry of Sports and Youth”				
33	Words (Arabic: kalimat)	2008	Children's Culture House				
34	Flower bouquet (Arabic: baqat ward)	2012	Children's Culture House				
35	What a beautiful pigeons! (Arabic: ma 'ajmal alhamami!)	2013	"Dar Al-Buraq”				
36	Two winds (Arabic: riahayn)	2013					
37	Two flowers (Arabic: warudatan)	2013					
38	Princess Baghdad (Arabic: al'amira baghdad)	2013	Children's Culture House				
39	Concepts 1 (Arabic: almafahim 1)	2013	"Al-Horoof Publishing House”	44	978-9948-20-359-9	Educational group: With Malak Obaid, illustrated by Diana Shamma	
40	Concepts 2 (Arabic: almafahim 2)	2013	"Al-Horoof Publishing House”	44	978-9948-20-360-5	Educational group: With Malak Obaid, illustrated by Diana Shamma	
41	Letters Family 1 (Arabic: eayilat alhuruf 1)	2013	"Kalimat Group for Publishing and Distribution”	62	978-9948-20-223-3	Educational group: with Malak Obaid, illustrated by Maya Fidawi	
42	Letters Family 2 (Arabic: eayilat alhuruf 2)	2013	"Kalimat Group for Publishing and Distribution”	62	978-9948-20-224-0	Educational group: with Malak Obaid, illustrated by Maya Fidawi	
43	Letters Family 3 (Arabic: eayilat alhuruf 3)	2013	"Kalimat Group for Publishing and Distribution”	60	978-9948-20-225-7	Educational group: with Malak Obaid, illustrated by Maya Fidawi	
44	Who challenges the rabbit? (Arabic: mn yatahadaa al'arnab)	2014	"Child Culture Center”			Lubna Taha's drawings	
45	Dreams (Arabic: 'ahlam)	2014	"Dar Al Banan for Printing, Publishing and Distribution”	24		Rima Koussa's drawings	
46	Tooth brush (Arabic: firshat al'asnan)	2014	"Dar Al-Jawadin”				
47	Where were you (Arabic: 'ayn kunt)	2014				With Mohammed Al-Thaher	
48	Hygiene butterfly (Arabic: farashat alnazafa)	2014	"The Ministry of Education in cooperation with a Japanese children’s organization”				
49	Enriched beads (Arabic: kharaz mughanna)	2015					
50	Where does the locust sleep (Arabic: 'ayn tanam aljarada)	2015	"Child Culture Center” “Dar Al-aswar”	19		Lubna Taha's drawings	
51	Jungle of letters (Arabic: ghabat alhuruf)	2015	"Al-Buraq House for Children's Culture”	36	978-964-192-817-1	4-part series, Firdaus Moneim illustrations	
52	Where has my shadow fled!! (Arabic: 'ayn harab zali!!)	2015	Dar Al Hodhud for Publishing and Distribution	32	978-9948-22-964-3	Musical puppet play: illustrated by Hassan Al-Saadi and Hummam Majeed	
53	The exciting race (Arabic: alsibaq almuthir)	2015	Dar Al Hodhud for Publishing and Distribution	32	978-9948-22-963-6	Musical puppet play: illustrated by Hassan Al-Saadi and Hummam Majeed	
54	Im growing (Arabic: 'iiniy 'anmu)	2016	"Dar Al-Hadayek for printing, publishing and distribution.”	20	978-614-439-066-5	Drawings by Lujaina Al-Aseel	
55	When the crow sings (Arabic: eindama yughni alghurab)	2016	"Dar Al Banan for Printing, Publishing and Distribution”	104	978-9953-598-61-1	Nadine Issa's drawings	
56	Letter Family Cards (Arabic: bitaqat eayilat alhuruf)	2016	Kalimat Group for Publishing and Distribution		978-9948-02-599-3	Educational group: Maya Fidawi's illustrations	
57	My dad is a martyr (Arabic: 'ana 'abi shahid)	2016			978-964-192-906-2		
58	A mouse visits his cousin (Arabic: far yazur abn eamih)	2017	"Child Culture Center”			Lubna Taha's drawings	
59	You and I (Arabic: 'ana wa'ant)	2018	"Noon Publishing and Distribution House"	24	978-1-926523-24-8	Drawings by Omar Lafie	
60	Acts we love (Arabic: 'afeal nahbuha)	2018	"Dar Al-Hadayek for printing, publishing and distribution.”	28	978-614-439-102-0	Nadine Sidani's drawings	
61	The band (Arabic: alfirqa almusiqia)	2018	Academia International	20	978-9953-37-256-3	Drawings by Fadwa Zainab	
62	Words we love (Arabic: kalimat nahibaha)	2018	"Dar Al-Hadayek for printing, publishing and distribution.”	16	978-9953-496-77-1	Nadine Sidani's drawings	
63	Doors (Arabic: 'abwab)	2018	The Syrian General Book Organization	40		Drawings by Qahtan Al Tala'a	
64	Until now (Arabic: 'illa 'uf)	2018	"Dar Al-Hadayek for printing, publishing and distribution.”	16	978-614-439-150-1	Nadine Sidani's drawings	
65	Seven Pearls (Arabic: sabe lali)	2019	"Al-Buraq House for Children's Culture”	24	978-600-466-073-0	Illustrated by Abdul Rahman Hanoon Al-Saadi	
66	I love my homeland (Arabic: 'ahibu watani)	2019	"Al-Buraq House for Children's Culture”	12	978-600-466-158-4	Drawings by Firdaus Munem	
67	I love my family (Arabic: 'uhibu 'usrati)	2019	"Al-Buraq House for Children's Culture”	12	978-600-466-159-1	Drawings by Firdaus Munem	
68	I love my school (Arabic: 'uhibu madrasati)	2019	"Al-Buraq House for Children's Culture”	12	978-600-466-160-7	Drawings by Firdaus Munem	
69	When the clouds fight (Arabic: eindama tatakhasam alghuyum)	2019	"Dar Al-Huda”	34		Drawings by Raad Abdul Wahed	
70	Sky (Arabic: sama')	2019		24	978-1-926523-25-5	Drawings by Abeer Hasan	
71	Grandma and her sheep (Arabic: aljada wanaejatuha)	2019	"Dar Al-Huda”	28		Drawings by Raad Abdul Wahed	
72	Smiling sun (Arabic: shams tadhak)	2020	"Dar Al Banan for Printing, Publishing and Distribution”	24	978-614-455-063-2	Hisham Suleiman's drawings	
