= Cəlilli =

Jalilli
- Municipality
- Azerbaijani: Cəlilli
- Location within Azerbaijan
- Coordinates: 41°02′19″N 45°35′45″E
- Country: Azerbaijan
- District: Tovuz

Population
  - Total: 1,830
- Time zone: UTC+4 (AZT)
  - Summer (DST): UTC+5 (AZT)

Cəlilli (Jalilli) is a village and municipality in the Tovuz District of Azerbaijan. It has a population of 1,830.
