= Jalil Tarif =

Jordanian economist

Jalil Tarif is a Jordanian economist. He currently serves as the Secretary General of the Arab Union for Securities Commissions.

== Education ==
Jalil Tarif obtained his Bachelor of Science in economics from the University of Jordan in 1978. He also holds a Diploma in Economics from the International Development Center of Japan and an M.A. in economics from the University of Jordan.

== Career ==
Tarif started his career in the Central Bank of Jordan and held the positions of executive director and Deputy Director General in Amman Financial Market between 1992 and 1999, where he oversaw Jordan's entire capital market. Through his role as Deputy Director General, Tarif assisted in writing the new securities law that implemented the three separate entities that make up Jordan's Capital Market today. In 1999, Jalil Tarif was appointed as the first chief executive officer of Amman Stock Exchange. During his tenure as CEO, the ASE has implemented electronic trading system and all of the rules and regulations required to run the ASE. He left his position as chief executive officer in December 2012 to become the Secretary General of the Arab Union for Securities Commissions located in Dubai.

Some of the roles Tarif has held during his career include: President, NSC-Unix user group, Atos-Euro Next Market Solutions; Chairman of IOSCO Self-Regulatory Organization Consultative Committee; Member, OECD Corporate Governance Working Group, MENA region; Chairman of FIAS. In addition, Tarif spearheaded the team that established the Stock Exchange in Palestine. He also participated in meetings with the IMF, IBRD, IOSCO, WFE, FEAS, and UNCTAD.

Tarif's research record covers the following: Role of Capital Markets in Privatization; Transparency; Income Tax Treatment of Investment; Obstacles to Attract Foreign Investment; Legal Structure of Arab Stock Exchanges; External Debt and Economic Development; Foreign Exchange Control; Corporate Governance.
