= Deh-e Jalil =

Deh-e Jalil ده جليل
- Village
- Location within Iran
- Coordinates: 30°38′07″N 51°17′59″E
- Country: Iran
- Province: Kohgiluyeh and Boyer-Ahmad
- County: Basht
- Bakhsh: Basht
- Rural District: Babuyi

Population (2006)
  - Total: 30
- Time zone: UTC+3:30 (IRST)
  - Summer (DST): UTC+4:30 (IRDT)

Deh-e Jalil (Persian: ده جليل, also Romanized as Deh-e Jalīl; also known as Jalīl) is a village in Babuyi Rural District, Basht District, Basht County, Kohgiluyeh and Boyer-Ahmad Province, Iran. At the 2006 census, its population was 30, in 5 families.
