= Jalil Huseynov =

Azerbaijani painter (born 1957)

Jalil Huseynov Cəlil Hüseynov
- Born: April 1, 1957 (age 67)
- Education: Kharkiv State Institute of Arts
- Occupation: painter
- Awards: Honored Artist of Azerbaijan

Jalil Gafar oghlu Huseynov (Azerbaijani: Cəlil Qafar oğlu Hüseynov, born April 1, 1957) is an Azerbaijani painter, professor, People's Artist of Azerbaijan (2005).

== Biography ==
Jalil Huseynov was born on April 1, 1957. In 1973–1977 he studied at the Azerbaijan State Azim Azimzade Art School, and in 1977–1982 he studied at the Kharkiv State Institute of Arts, majoring in monumental painting. Since 1983, he has been a member of the Artists' Union of the USSR.

In 1982-2000, he worked as a teacher, head teacher, associate professor, head of department and dean at Azerbaijan State University of Culture and Arts. In 2000–2010, he was vice-rector of the Azerbaijan State Academy of Fine Arts for educational affairs.

Jalil Huseynov has been working as an author of architectural projects since 1986. He is the author of monumental works and architectural projects in a number of settlements in Turkey and Azerbaijan.

Since 1982, the artist has participated in various national and international exhibitions. His works have been exhibited in the USA, France, Germany, Russia, Turkey, Iran, Georgia, Syria, UAE, Ukraine and other countries. A number of his works are kept in the National Art Museum of Azerbaijan and the Baku Museum of Modern Art, as well as in private collections.

== Awards ==
- People's Artist of Azerbaijan — December 28, 2005
- Honored Artist of Azerbaijan — May 30, 2002
