= Khal Dalil =

Khal Dalil خال دليل
- Village
- Location within Iran
- Coordinates: 36°33′55″N 45°47′50″E
- Country: Iran
- Province: West Azerbaijan
- County: Mahabad
- Bakhsh: Khalifan
- Rural District: Kani Bazar

Population (2006)
  - Total: 192
- Time zone: UTC+3:30 (IRST)
  - Summer (DST): UTC+4:30 (IRDT)

Khal Dalil (Persian: خال دليل, also Romanized as Khāl Dalīl) is a village in Kani Bazar Rural District, Khalifan District, Mahabad County, West Azerbaijan Province, Iran. At the 2006 census, its population was 192, in 26 families.
