= Jannat Jalil =

British journalist

Jannat Jalil is a TV and radio news presenter. She worked as a reporter and presenter at BBC News before joining Sky News in 2011. She also presented on EuronewsNBC and has reported from Paris for the BBC, Sky and British newspapers. She rejoined the BBC in 2016 where she currently works.

She has an honours degree in English and European literature from Warwick University.
