= Tahir R. Andrabi =

Economist

Tahir Raza Shah Andrabi is a Pakistani-born American economist who is the Stedman-Sumner Professor of Economics at Pomona College in Claremont, California.

== Early life and education ==
Andrabi attended Swarthmore College, receiving a B.A. in 1984. He then received a doctorate in economics from the MIT Department of Economics in 1990. His thesis title was "Essays in International Trade and the Debt Crisis"; his supervisor was Paul Krugman. From 1992 to 1993 he was a visiting scholar at MIT and a postdoctoral research associate at the Harvard/MIT Research Training Group in Positive Political Economy.

== Work and career ==
Andrabi's research interests include the effects of school choice and the economy of Pakistan.

He began teaching at Pomona College in 1988. In 1999 and 2000, he was on the national economy advisory board of Pakistan.

== Personal life ==
Andrabi is a native of Pakistan. He is married to Shaila Andrabi, with whom he has three children as of 2003.
