= Murder of Jalil Andrabi =

1996 Indian killing of a Kashmiri activist

Jalil Andrabi was a prominent Kashmiri human rights lawyer and pro independence political activist associated with the Jammu Kashmir Liberation Front (JKLF). Andrabi was allegedly subjected to extrajudicial execution by Indian paramilitary troopers and renegades in March 1996.

On 8 March 1996, Andrabi was detained in Srinagar by Major Avtar Singh, of the 35th Rashtriya Rifles unit of the Indian Army. Three weeks later, Andrabi's body was found floating in the Jhelum River; an autopsy showed that he had been killed days after his arrest. A case is pending adjudication in a Budgam court against Major Avtar Singh.

== The murder of Jalil Andrabi ==
The body of 42 year old Andrabi, a human rights lawyer and pro-independence political activist associated with the JKLF, was found in the Kursu Rajbagh area of Srinagar on the banks of the Jhelum River on the morning of March 27, 1996. According to press reports, the body was in a burlap bag. According to eyewitnesses, Andrabi was detained at about 6:00 pm on March 8 by a Rashtriya Rifles unit of the army which intercepted his car a few hundred yards from his home in Srinagar. The officer allegedly responsible had fled the country and was wanted by the Indian government in relation to the killing. India had issued a warrant for his arrest and an interpol alert.

== Death of Avtar Singh ==
On 9 June 2012, Avtar Singh, 47, then living in Selma, California, killed his wife, Hervinder Kaur, 36; and two of his three children, Jay Singh (aged 3) and Kinwaljeet "Aryan" Singh (aged 15). The eldest child, 17-year-old son Kanwarpal "Chris" Singh, suffered serious head injuries with a handgun. He called police to admit the killings and then shot and killed himself. and was taken off life support in Community Regional Medical Center at Selma and died on 14 June 2012.
