= Ali Jaleel =

Maldivian Mujahid (1979–2009)

- Born: 1979; Malé, Maldives
- Died: May 27, 2009 (aged 30); Lahore, Pakistan
- Other name: Musab Sayyid
- Occupation: Terrorist
- Known for: terrorism

Ali Jaleel (1979–2009) was a citizen of the Maldives who is reported to have died as a suicide bomber. He is reported to have attacked the Inter-Service Intelligence Directorate headquarters in Lahore, Pakistan on 27 May 2009.

Pakistani accounts from the time of the attack say the three attackers who were killed, were unidentified. Subsequently, a martyr video, and an interview established Ali Jaleel was one of the bombers.

Ali Jaleel, and two other Maldivian citizens were captured in 2006, on suspicion they were attempting to travel to Pakistan for underground military training. He was convicted of preaching without a license in December 2006. He was sentenced to two years house arrest on December 26, 2006.

According to Haveeru Daily, he violated his house arrest and was sentenced to four months of banishment on February 8, 2008.
