= Jalili dynasty =

Rulers of Mosul, Iraq, 1726–1834

Al Jalili
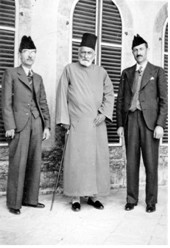
- Ismail Al Jalili (1865–1943), with his sons Sadeeq Al Jalili (1903–1980) and Qaidar Al Jalili (1914–1995)
- Current region: Mosul, Iraq
- Members: Abdul Jalil, Isma’il Pasha al-Jalili, Hussein Pasa al-Jalili, Muhammad Pasha Jalili, Mahmoud Beg al-Jalili

The al-Jalili family (Arabic: الجليلي), are an Iraqi Arab family who served as effective rulers of the city of Mosul, Ottoman Iraq, between 1726 until 1834, during its integration as a district of the Ottoman Empire. They are credited with investing considerable capital in religious institutions and charitable activities, as well as benefiting systems of patronage and considerable growth in cultural activities within the capital during this period.

== Family lineage ==
The first prominent Jalili, "Abdul Jalil" was a Christian employed in the Pasha's household during the late seventeenth century. At this point the family had already established themselves firmly as notables within the Mosul elite, exerting both political and economic influence:

The Jalili family’s fortune seems to have been the result of their effectiveness as grain merchants and contractors. With their wealth they successfully acquired leadership in the Janissary corps, the right to collect certain taxes, property in the city and countryside, the government’s gratitude for their help in winning the war, and continuing alliances for access to local resources.

Along with the al-Umari and Tasin al-Mufti families, the Jalilis formed an "urban-based small and medium gentry and a new landed elite", which proceeded to displace the control of previous rural tribes. Such families proceed to establish themselves through private enterprise, solidifying their influence and assets through rents on land and taxes on urban and rural manufacturing. Fortifying "a powerful political dynasty with the acquiescence of the central Ottoman government" families such as the Jalilis developed into ruling elites within a progressively stratified social hierarchy, leading to the development of increasingly exclusive breeding patterns and lineage. As Gertrude Bell recounted of one of the Jalilis during her travels through Iraq in 1910:

I sat long in the guest chamber of a third acquaintance, the head of the greatest family in Mosul. So stainless is his lineage that his sisters must remain unwed, since Mosul cannot provide a husband equal to them in birth. His forebears were Christians who migrated from Diyabekr two hundred years ago. The legend runs that his Christian ancestor, soon after he had come to Mosul, went out in the morning to be shaved, but when he reached the barber’s shop it was filled with low-born Moslems and the barber kept him waiting until the heads of the Faithful had been trimmed. "Shall a man of my house wait for such as these?” he cried, and forthwith abjured the creed of slaves.

Although the governing status of the Jalili family was curtailed by the Ottomans in 1834, in line with their breeding and integration within the Maslawi elite, the family still managed to maintain its influence both among the Maslawi people and the central Ottoman government framework. By the early 20th Century, the British still considered the Jalilis to be the "first family in Mosul," albeit one that now "remained aloof from political or business circles."

== Governorate of Mosul ==
=== Development of Ottoman rule ===
Although Mesopotamia had technically been integrated within the Ottoman Empire since 1533, when it was taken from the Safavids during the Ottoman–Safavid War (1532–55), until the reconquest of Baghdad in 1638 during the Ottoman–Safavid War (1623–1639) the city of Mosul "was still a mere fortress, important for its strategic position as an offensive platform for Ottoman campaigns into Iraq, as well as a defensive stronghold and plaque tournante guarding the approaches to Anatolia and to the Syrian coast. Then with the Ottoman reconquest of Baghdad, the liwa' of Mosul became an independent wilaya."

Despite being a part of the Ottoman Empire, during the four centuries of Ottoman rule Mosul was considered "the most independent district" within the Middle East, following the Roman model of indirect rule through local notables. "Mosuli culture developed less along Ottoman-Turkish lines than along Iraqi-Arab lines; and Turkish, the official language of the State, was certainly not the dominant language in the province."

In line with its status as a politically stable trade route between the Mediterranean and the Gulf the city developed considerably during the seventeenth and early eighteenth centuries. Similar to the development of the Mamluk dynasty in Baghdad, during this time "the Jalili family was establishing itself as the undisputed master of Mosul", and "helping to connect Mosul with a pre-Ottoman, pre-Turcoman, pre-Mongol, Arab cultural heritage which was to put the town on its way to recapturing some of the prestige and prominence it had enjoyed under the golden reign of Badr ad-Din Lu’lu'."

=== Jalili governors ===
Appointed directly by the sultan to control the running of the province, the role of governor was the highest ruling authority within Ottoman Mosul. The governor was appointed with the rank of Paşa, and oversaw the extensive administrative framework required to ensure the continued development of local resources and trade, the collection of taxes and the provision of security within Mosul as well as key rural areas and villages surrounding the capital. By the mid-nineteenth century, the governor was in charge of a yearly budget of over four million piasters.

Starting in 1726 with the appointment of Isma’il Pasha Jalili (the son of Abdul Jalil), the role of governor became almost exclusively that of the Jalilis until 1834, with governors including:

1. Isma’il Paşa: became first Jalili governor and contractor of provisions in 1726–7.
2. 'Abdul Baqi ibn 'Ubaid Aga Jalili: governor 1785–6, least popular of the Jalili governors. Descended from the 'Ubaid Aga branch of the family, who were leaders of the janissaries.
3. Fattah Paşa Jalili: head of the Jalili household 1769–71, opposing the main household of the Hussein Paşa al-Jalili.
4. Hussein Paşa Jalili: first appointed to the office of governor in 1730. Reinstated seven times thereafter, until 1757–8. Major contractor on the eastern frontier.
5. Sa’dallah Paşa, son of Hussein Paşa: governor 1810–12. The Paşa who obtained his office by bribing Halet Efendi [...].
6. Hasan Paşa, son of Hussein Paşa: governor 1818.
7. Amin Paşa Jalili: first appointed in 1752. Reinstated five times until 1775. Served on the Russian front in the [Russo-Turkish War 1768–1774|Turko-Russian war of 1768-74].
8. Muhammad Paşa Jalili, son of Amin Paşa: his tenure, 1789–1806, was the longest continuous tenure of any Jalili governor.
9. Suleiman Paşa Jalili: first tenure as governor 1771–5. Reappointed three times after that. Last tenure in 1786–9.
10. 'Abd al-Rahman Paşa, son of Abdallah Bey: governor 1821–2.
11. Mahmud Paşa, son of Muhammad Paşa: governor 1818–21.
12. Ahmad Paşa, son of Suleiman Paşa: governor 1812-17 and 1818–21.
13. Nu’man Paşa, son of Suleiman Paşa: governor 1806–8.
14. Abd al-Rahman Paşa, son of Mahmud Paşa: governor 1827–8. Shot dead by the rebels against Jalili rule.
15. Muhammad Amin Paşa, son of Uthman Beg Jalili: governor 1829. Successfully ousted by the rebels and their leader. Qasim Paşa, son of Hasan al-Umari then became governor.
16. Yahya Paşa, son of Nu’man Paşa: governor 1822–7. His rule marked the beginning of the end of Jalili rule. In 1826, sections of the city's population, led by Qasim Umari rebelled.

=== Ottoman centralization and end of Jalili governorate ===
In the nineteenth century the Ottoman government started to reclaim central control over its outlying provinces. Their aim was to "restore Ottoman law, and rejuvenate the military" as well as reviving "a secure tax base for the government". Due to their social and economic influence, and the credibility they had secured with local constituents as indigenous Maslawi rulers who had reinvested substantial wealth back into the city's buildings and wider infrastructure, the Jalilis and other ruling elites were perceived by the central Ottoman government "as a threat to their interests". Consequently, the central Ottoman government proceeded to reassert their power by "neutraliz[ing] local families such as the Jalilis and their class."

In order to establish this process of neutralization in 1834 the practice of holding public elections for the position of governor was abolished, and the sultan began appointing new, non-Maslawi governors directly. As a result, new governors "would attain power and legitimacy not by their connections to the people of the city or their sponsorship of urban life and local economies, but exclusively from their appointments by the Ottoman Sultan." This process started in 1834 with the appointment of Bayraktar Mehmet Pasha, who was to rule Mosul for the next four years.

In line with its reintegration within central government rule, Mosul was required to conform to new Ottoman reform legislation, including the standardization of tariff rates, the consolidation of internal taxes and the integration of the administrative apparatus with the central government. Yet, despite their attempts to reclaim control over the Maslawi government apparatus, the city's most prominent families such as the Jalilis still retained significant influence "not only within local circles, but also within the central government apparatus."

After the reign of Bayraktar Mehmet Pasha, the Ottoman government (wishing still to restrain the influence of powerful local families) appointed a series of governors in rapid succession, ruling "for only a brief period before being sent somewhere else to govern, making it impossible for any of them to achieve a substantial local power base." Without this power base, such Pashas remained dependent upon families such as the Jalilis to "intercede on their behalf" with local Maslawis in order for them to accomplish "even their most basic tasks of collecting taxes and providing security". Ironically, in "one of the last administrative changes of the reform era" in which proxy rule by appointed Pashas gave way to direct, centralized rule by Sultan Abdulhamid II, the deputies appointed to discharge Ottoman jurisdiction "once again hailed from traditional elite families in the city."

== Socio-cultural developments in Jalili Mosul ==
As stated by Percy Kemp, the rise to power of the Jalilis within Mosul led to a major shift in the religion, politics and culture of the capital:

Secure in their position as rulers and as notables the Jalilis invested considerable capital in religious institutions, and in a society where religion, politics and culture often merge, the patronage system benefited from the formation of political clienteles. In Jalili Mosul, cultural life saw an effervescence contrasting sharply with the vacuum that followed the Mongol invasion, and a sense of purpose and direction contrasting with the hesitant, disorientated and fragmented cultural trends of the second half of the nineteenth century.

Included within this investment were "building projects, constructing schools, mosques, shops, and a large khan where merchants could stay [and] store their goods". This type of investment, designed not only to generate money on rents, but also to signify the family's "commitment to the city and its institutions" was not restricted to the Jalilis. Between 1700 and 1834, several other notable families involved in governing Mosul invested "large fortunes in public construction, building mosques, khans, markets, baths, and schools[, …] constructed at least 390 new shops [and] worked to create support in the city and to both display and legitimize their great wealth by their creation of new infrastructure".

=== Education ===
Education was a keystone for investment in Jalili Mosul, with over 20 schools offering "a wide spectrum of courses ranging from Coranic exegesis to arithmetic and from grammar to astronomy." The establishment of new schools and mosques, and the reputation of its educators broadened Mosul's influence and eminence:

To Mosul and its schools came Kurds from neighbouring towns and villages as well as Arabs from the tribes passing through the province. These Kurds and Arabs came to Mosul to stay and become part of the cultural élite. The prestige and reputation of some Mosuli teachers (Haddadi, Rabtaki, Wa’iz) also attracted students and scholars from Damascus, Aleppo, Baghdad and other important places of learning. They came to Mosul for a while and then returned home having studied with the shaikh they were originally seeking.

=== Religion ===
In Jalili Mosul religion played both a major role in education, and served as a significant nucleus for social tension. Mosul was populated by a significant diversity of religions, highlighted by the Jalilis themselves: a historically Christian family, who ruled on behalf of a Muslim Turkish sultan, in a predominantly Sunni Arabic city. Muslim beliefs within Mosul were heavily entrenched in the Sufic tradition:

The sufi khanqa was another constitutive element of this profile. Sufism was a fundamental part of the Mosuli religious, cultural and mental personality, and practically all the learned men mentioned in the biographical dictionaries were sufis. Furthermore the Kurdish mountains had a strong sufi tradition, and most of the Kurds who came and settled in Mosul brought with them a vivid sufi experience.

In line with this tradition arose a fundamentalist Sufic movement which affected both the people and the ruling elite, leading to several prominent figures (including Uthman Bey b. Sulaiman Pasha Jalili) publicly emphasizing their Sufic identities and calling for the "purification of the religious experience under attack from the many abuses and superstitions which tarnished its image".

This intellectual climate illustrates the uneasy position of a Sunni Arab Mosul with a strong sufi tradition, caught as it then was between a religiously similar yet ethnically and linguistically different Ottoman overlord, a Persia which was as alienating in its Sunni as in its Shii variants, and an Arab, yet staggering, fundamentalist Sunni Arabia.

=== Cultural production ===
As well as religious tracts, Jalili Mosul was home to the widespread discussion of philosophy, history and literature, the recitation and creation of poetry, and the in-depth "study of language, philology and literary criticism, presented in numerous short treatises as well as in encyclopedic works dealing with allegory, metaphor, metonymy, rhetoric, grammar, syntax etc.". Over 20 historical works can be dated to Jalili Mosul, including "dynastic histories, annalistic histories, biographical dictionaries, hagiographies, regional histories and contemporary chronicles."

Generally, cultural activity centered around two key areas. Firstly, the coffee-houses (which numbered over 120 in Mosul), in which Janissary leaders would sit and liaise with royal envoys and elite families, form political alliances and trade contracts, and recite poetry and mawawil. Secondly, and most importantly, the majlis of the prince or notable in which "friends and clients assembled to listen to poetry and music". Indeed, in line with this cultural backdrop, poetry became by far the most prominent and widespread literary genre:

The notables, of course, directly inspired madh poetry which flourished at that time in Mosul, and they encouraged other genres such as mawawil, ikhwaniyat, ghazal and khamriyat by organizing poetic competitions and awarding prizes in species. Poetry in its various forms was an important means of communication – conversation, oratory duels, correspondence, etc. – and it served as an indicator for assessing the local political climate and the power and prestige of the various notables. This poetry gravitated around, and was fed by, the majlis of the muluk and the a’yan.

== Defence of Mosul against Nadir Shah ==
In 1743 Maslawi forces, raised, organized and led by Hussein Pasha al-Jalili defeated the invasion of the Persian army of Nadir Shah. The event has been labeled as one of the most important events in 18th Century Middle Eastern history, not only due to its status as the only retreat suffered by the great Persian conqueror at the hands of his Ottoman adversaries, but as a defeat inflicted not by an Ottoman imperial army commanded by an Ottoman general, but by provincial forces.

The invasion was part of an ongoing dispute between the Ottomans and the Persians over the possession of the area, which extended from the Ottomans' first conquering of Mosul in 1515. Although in 1555 the Ottomans and Safavids signed the Treaty of Zuhab (or Qasr’i Shirin) in 1639, a peace accord based on accepting the legitimacy of each other's empires, in 1732 Nadir Shah launched a new initiative to reconquer Iraq, leading to four separate invasions between 1732 and 1743. Hussein Pasha al-Jalili's success in repelling Nadir Shah's forces in 1743 helped lead to the conclusion of this initiative.

== Notable members of the al-Jalili family ==
- Dr. Mahmoud Beg al-Jalili (1921–2011), co-founder and first president of the University of Mosul in 1967, first chancellor of its medical school and co-writer of the Unified English-Arabic Medical Dictionary. Mahmoud al-Jalili was the first Arab to be given membership of the Royal College of Physicians. On his death in 2011, the governor of Mosul Atheel Abdulaziz Mohammed Al-Najafi renamed "Culture Street", the street facing the University of Mosul to "Mahmoud Jalili Street" in honour of his contribution to the university and the city.
- Dr. Ismail Qaidar Jalili (1947–2019). Ophthalmic surgeon and discoverer of the Jalili syndrome.

== See also ==
- Mamluk dynasty of Iraq, rulers of the pashaliks of Baghdad, Basrah, and Shahrizor in this period.
- Bakhdida
- Timeline of Mosul

== Notes ==
=== Bibliography ===
- Al-Tikriti, Nabil (2007). "Ottoman Iraq". The Journal of the Historical Society. VII (2): 201–212. doi:10.1111/j.1540-5923.2007.00214.x.
- Bell, Gertrude (1910). Amurath to Amurath. New York, NY: E. P. Dutton & Co.
- Kemp, Percy (1979). Mosul and Mosuli Historians in the Jalili Era (Ph.D. thesis). University of Oxford.
- Kemp, Percy (1981). "Mosuli Sketches of Ottoman History". Middle Eastern Studies. 17 (3): 310–333. doi:10.1080/00263208108700475. JSTOR 4282840. (An analysis of Ottoman history in line with historical texts written by Ali Umari, Amin Umari, Uthman and Yasin Al Jalili).
- Kemp, Percy (1983). "Power and knowledge in Jalili Mosul". Middle Eastern Studies. 19 (2): 201–212. doi:10.1080/00263208308700543. JSTOR 4282936.
- Khoury, Dina Rizk (1997). State and Provincial Society in the Ottoman Empire: Mosul, 1540-1834. Cambridge Studies in Islamic Civilization. Cambridge: Cambridge University Press.
- Olson, Robert W. (1975). The Siege of Mosul and Ottoman-Persian Relations 1718-1743. Uralic and Altaic Series. Vol. 124. Indiana: Indiana University Publications.
- Shields, Sarah D. (2000). Mosul before Iraq; Like Bees Making Five-Sided Cells. New York, NY: State University of New York.
