= Welsh National Bowls Championships =

Welsh lawn bowls competition

Tournament information
- Sport: Lawn bowls
- Location: Wales
- Established: 1919
- Host: Welsh Lawn Bowls
- Venue: Llandrindod Wells
- Website: wlb.wales

The Welsh National Bowls Championships is organised by Welsh Lawn Bowls (WLB) which was formed in 2023 as an amalgamation of the Welsh Bowling Association and Welsh Women's Bowling Association. The first national championships were held in 1919.

The singles title was originally called the Cadle Cup named after P.C Cadle who presented the WBA with the cup.

== Past winners ==
=== Men's singles ===
Year	Champion	Runner-up	Ref
1919	J P Williams (Grange)	W. Tucker (Splott)	
1920	T J Jones (Llanbradach)	W. J. Davies (Roath Park)	
1921	H Burbridge (Cadoxton)	Teddy Jones (Abertillery)	
1922	Teddy Jones (Abertillery)	J. Pratt (Victoria Park Cardiff)	
1923	Percy Holloway (Barry Athletic)	J. C. Hitt (Bridgend)	
1924	C. G. K. Penn (Penylan)	Frank O'Donnell (Mackintosh)	
1925	W. McAllister (Bridgend)	G. H. Norris (Grange)	
1926	J. F. Williams (Cadoxton)	W. H. Green (Belle Vue)	
1927	W. H. Green (Belle Vue)	J. Lewis (Penygraig)	
1928	H. R. Rees (Howard Gardens)	D. J. Squires (Pantygwydr)	
1929	H. R. Edwards (Rhiwbina)	Bert Macey (Whitchurch)	
1930	C. Cecil (Pontnewynydd)	W. H. Clarke (Newport Athletic)	
1931	A. Reynolds (Six Bells)	P. H. Rowlands (Llwynypia)	
1932	Stan Weaver (Swansea)	Stan Cecil (Pontypool Park)	
1933	Emrys Rees (Llwynypia)	S. C. Parr (Penylan)	
1934	Percy Holloway (Bargoed)	E. Jones (Richmond)	
1935	Len Hill (GKB)	E. Williams (Pontypridd)	
1936	Edgar Thomas (Bargoed)	S. R. Lathey (Windsor)	
1937	Alfred Thomas (Dafen)	C. Colley (Windsor)	
1938	Teddy Jones (Abertillery)	A. Rees (Melyn United)	
1939	W Rees (Pontrhydyfen)	O. L. Parry (Windsor)	
1940	Teddy Jones (Abertillery)	D. T. Williams (Sketty)	
1941	T. Williams (Tonypandy)	H. M. Chapman (Lysaghts)	
1942	T. Williams (Tonypandy)	W. J. Moore (Splott)	
1943	W. J. Bowen (Merthyr WE)	S. Davies (Waunarlwydd)	
1944	R. Pettit (Bedwellty)	J. F. Britton (Porthcawl)	
1945	Wilf John (Rhymney Gwent)	Alfred Thomas (Dafen)	
1946	W. McCombe (Newbridge)	T. Warren (Llwynypia)	
1947	C. Weager (Oakdale)	H. Stradling (Treherbert)	
1948	J. Rodway (Ebbw Vale)	C. Conway (Spoltt)	
1949	Evan Rees (Brynhyfryd Neath)	A. S. Gwilliam (Cardiff)	
1950	Alfred Thomas (Dafen)	E. Evans (Rhymney Gwent)	
1951	Albert Evans (Abergavenny)	W. Rees (Pontrhydyfen)	
1952	Harry Pearson (Sketty)	T. C. Morris (Penylan)	
1953	Teddy Jones (Abertillery)	Alfred Thomas (Dafen)	
1954	A. T. Evans (Tonypandy)	Rhys Bowen (Beaufort)	
1955	William Glyn John (Parc Wern)	Cliff Beer (Bridgend)	
1956	Cliff Standfast (Newport Athletic)	Albert Ivett (RTB Landore)	
1957	Bernie Williams (Pontymister Welfare)	T.G. Thomas (Pontrhydyfen)	
1958	R. D. Roberts (RTB Landore)	F. Leamon (Caldicot)	
1959	Llew Rees (Tyrfran)	S. Standfast (Newport Athletic)	
1960	R. D. Roberts (RTB Landore)	L.C. Williams (Penarth)	
1961	Albert Evans (Abergavenny)	Clifford Evans (Gelli Park)	
1962	A. Thomas (Llanelli)	Gareth Humphreys (Barry Athletic)	
1963	Lynn Probert (Abergavenny)	B. Jones (Llanelli)	
1964	Bert Roan (Penarth)	T. Medd (West End)	
1965	Ron Smith (Aberkenfig)	L. Andrews (Cardiff)	
1966	W. Brown (Sketty Church)	S. Gould (Senghenydd)	
1967	J. Pipe (Panteg House)	Maldwyn Evans (Gelli Park)	
1968	V. King (Aberdare Park)	J. Pipe (Panteg House)	
1969	Des Morgan (Ammanford)	I. Phillips (Alcoa)	
1970	Paul Wright (Aberystwyth)	John Morgan Evans (Gelli Park)	
1971	Danny Price (Ammanford)	R. Williams (Newcastle Emlyn)	
1972	Steve Evans (Brynhyfryd Carms)	D. Palmer (Penclawdd)	
1973	Rod Hugh (Tyrfran)	E. Evans (Saundersfoot)	
1974	Les Hughes (Rhiwbina)	John Russell Evans (Barry Athletic)	
1975	R. B. Thomas (Cwmbran Park)	D. Cooke (Senghenydd)	
1976	John Russell Evans (Barry Athletic)	Teare Docton (Merthyr West End)	
1977	John Russell Evans (Barry Athletic)	Dai Wilkins (Pontrhydyfen)	
1978	Spencer Wilshire (Tonypandy)	P. Bailey (Llanelli)	
1979	David Cook (Senghenydd)	G. Robinson (Ynysybwl)	
1980	Edgar Thomas (Talgarth)	D. Poole (Saundersfoot)	
1981	John Colwill (BFS Combine)	D. Cook (Senghenydd)	
1982	Robert Price (Brynmawr)	H. Guy (Tenby)	
1983	Dai Wilkins (Pontrhydyfen)	Neil Mallard (Abergavenny)	
1984	Mal Goss (Ogmore Vale)	Paul Mullins (Gilfach Bargoed)	
1985	A. Evans (Aberystwyth)	Alan McCarley (Gorseinon)	
1986	Paul Mullins (Gilfach Bargoed)	J. King (Penylan)	
1987	Robert Price (Brynmawr)	Barry Fleming (Machynlleth)	
1988	John Ellis (St. Fagans)	Steve Evans (Guest Memorial)	
1989	Pat Toogood (Bridgend)	Robert Weale (Presteigne)	
1990	Will Thomas (Pontrhydyfen)	Robert Treherne (Llanbradach)	
1991	Rod Hugh (Parc Howard)	Will Thomas (Pontrhydyfen)	
1992	Mark Chard (Harlequins)	Richard Bowen (Cardigan)	
1993	Ron Rowlands (Llandrindod Wells)	John Price (Aberavon)	
1994	Alan McCarley (Brynhyfryd Carms)	Ray Davies (St. Gabriel's)	
1995	John Tomlinson Sr. (Glyncorrwg)	David Kingdon (Parc y Dre)	
1996	Dai Wilkins (Pontrhydyfen)	Adrian Price (Ammanford)	
1997	Steve Jackson (Llanbradach)	Nick Bithray (Ammanford Park)	
1998	Rob Rees (Taibach)	Mark Williams (Nixon's)	
1999	Mark Williams (Nixon's)	John Price (Aberavon)	
2000	Robert Weale (Presteigne)	Roland Salmon (Aberystwyth)	
2001	Steve Hill (Porthcawl)	Robert Price (R.T.B. Ebbw Vale)	
2002	John K Evans (Rhymney Gwent)	Ryan Mountstephen (Penhill)	
2003	Wayne Griffiths (Welshpool Town)	G. Ellis (Aberystwyth)	
2004	Richard Morgan (Penylan)	John K Evans (Rhymney Gwent)	
2005	Robert Weale (Presteigne)	Neil Rees (Parc y Dre)	
2006	Kevin James (Cardigan)	Steve Harris (RTB Ebbw Vale)	
2007	Mark Weaver (Montgomery)	Steve Harris (RTB Ebbw Vale)	
2008	Roger Jones (Panteg Park)	Andrew Atwood (Caerphilly)	
2009	Tom Hancock (Cross Keys)	Chris Prosser (Harlequins)	
2010	Ross Tomlinson (Glyncorrwg)	Phil Holloway (Llantrisant)	
2011	Jason Greenslade (Penarth)	Ross Tomlinson (Glyncorrwg)	
2012	Robert Weale (Presteigne)	Paul Taylor (Bridgend)	
2013	David Kingdon (Kidwelly Town)	Steve Harris (RTB Ebbw Vale)	
2014	Jason Greenslade (Penarth)	Andrew Fleming (Machynlleth)	
2015	Jonathan Tomlinson (RTB Ebbw Vale)	Robert Weale (Presteigne)	
2016	David Kingdon (Kidwelly Town)	Martin Clarke (Barry Athletic)	
2017	Roger Jones (Beaufort)	Sam Roff (Llandrindod Wells)	
2018	Kevin James (Cardigan)	Mark Weaver (Montgomery)	
2019	Ben Thomas (Pontrhydyfen)	Jordan Davies (Harelquins)	
2020	cancelled due to COVID-19 pandemic		
2021	Kevin James (Cardigan)	Simon Ace (Resolven)	
2022	Daniel Salmon (Penylan)	Martin Clarke Squires (Barry Athletic)	
2023	Ross Owen (Harlequins)	David Kingdon (Tenby)	
2024	Carl Wood (Llanbradach)	Ross Owen (Harlequins)	
2025	Connor Murphy (New Tredegar)	Andrew Flemming (Machynlleth)	
2026	Owain Dando (RTB Ebbw Vale)	Ben Matthews (Graig Merthyr)	

=== Men's pairs ===
Year	Champion	Runner-Up	Ref
1919	Penarth (W. R. Evans, T. Taylor)		
1920	St. Julian (W. Rowe, F.E. Rees)	Penarth Belle Vue (J. Lancaster, A. Harwood)	
1921	Bridgend (T.B. Gracie, W. McAlister)	Llanbradach (J. Dawson, W.H. Harris)	
1922	Grange (P. Driscoll, J.P. Williams)	Barry Athletic (Percy Holloway, James Holloway)	
1923	Dinas Powis (I.B. Thomas, Robert Graham)	Roath Park (W.H. Williams, E. Marsh)	
1924	Belle Vue (W. Sergeant, H.J. Strong)	Mackintosh (E. Dawe, D.H. Ross)	
1925	Melyn United (W.J. Dummer, J. Dummer)	Llwynypia (W.J. Ball, P.H. Rowlands)	
1926	Penylan (B.P. Evans, T. Evans)	Melyn United (W.J. Dummer, J. Dummer)	
1927	Pantygwydr (Trevor Toms, E. Hill)	Abertillery (P. Tilley, W. Walters)	
1928	Llanelli (Will Skym, A.J. Stacey)	Windsor (W.E. Fiddes, E. Parry)	
1929	Newport Athletic (H.M. Chapman, G.A. Bullock)	Fairoak (W. Elias, E. Rees)	
1930	Mackintosh (W. Edwards, S.H. Travers)	Melyn United (R. Hughes, A. Rees)	
1931	Mackintosh (S.H. Travers, Frank O'Donnell)	Briton Ferry Town	
1932	Abercarn (F. Prince, W. J. Treen)	Dinam Park (M. Gayland, E. Smith)	
1933	Aberbargoed (H. Roper, W. Walters)	Pantygwydr (T. Howell, J.E. Donnelly)	
1934	Swansea (Thomas Davies, Stan Weaver)	Rhiwbina (H.R. Edwards, T. Mann)	
1935	Pontypool Park (C. Barker, E. Evans)	Howard Garages (A. Townsend, H.R. Rees)	
1936	Port Talbot Municipal (J. Miles, Len Hill)	Rhiwbina (L.H. Nash, T. Mann)	
1937	Bargoed (M. Jones, A. Jones)	Llanbradach (T.J. Head, H. Wise)	
1938	Gelli Park (R. Williams, W. Howells)	GKB Port Talbot (B. Richards, W.A. Jones)	
1939	Oakdale (L. Edwards, R. Bigs)	Dinam Park (T. Evans, I.T. Jones)	
1940	Parc Howard (D. John, A.J. Stacey)	Roath Park (C.C. Johnson, W. Bevand)	
1941	Lovell's Athletic (J. Hillman, F. Pemberton)	Sketty (P. Jones, D.T. Williams)	
1942	Roath Park (W. Gaskell, C. Knight)	Sketty (P. Jones, D.T.Williams)	
1943	Rhymney Gwent (E. Evans, Wilf John)	Port Talbot Municipal (Jack Griffiths, Len Hill)	
1944	Gowerton (D.V. John, W.R. Davies)	Oakdale (E. Collins, C. Weager)	
1945	Bailey Park, Abergavenny (Albert Evans, W.H. Evans)	Cyfarthfa Castle (J. Williams, J. James)	
1946	Melyn United (A. Rees, J. Dummer)	Pontymister Welfare (I. Jones, I. Griffin)	
1947	Melyn United (D. Morgan, T. Beasley)	Newbridge (W. Sammons, W. McCombie)	
1948	Brynhyfryd Neath (K. Rees, Evan Rees)	Gilfach Bargoed (A. Jones, Idris Miles)	
1949	Briton Ferry Steel (F. Jones, W. Coop)	Ferndale (H. Winn, J.S. Hill)	
1950	Cardiff (I. Davies, F.L. Cottie)	Port Talbot Municipal (Jack Griffiths, Len Hill)	
1951	Penarth (Dr. E. M. Jones, L.C. Williams)	Bronwydd Park (R. Davies, T. Meadon)	
1952	Ocean Staff (John Morgan Evans, Clifford Maldwyn Evans)	Victoria Park (W. Williams, F. May)	
1953	Abergavenny (Claude Stephens, Albert Evans)	Llanelli (Hubert E. Thomas, P.D. Thomas)	
1954	Ely Valley (E. Mullen, W.R. Evans)	Penarth Belle Vue (D.A. Jones, E. Evans)	
1955	Melyn United (J. Morgan, F. Hinders)	Cwmbran (A. P. Campbell, Bill Pattimore)	
1956	Rhymney Royal (Jack Lewis, Wilf John)	Gilfach Bargoed (Amwel Jones, Idris Miles)	
1957	Port Talbot Municipal (Jack Griffiths, Len Hill)	Sully (J.F. Smith, A. Smith)	
1958	Penygraig Belle Vue (T. Warren, T.R. Williams)	Bridgend (W. McAlister, Cliff Beer)	
1959	Troedyrhiw (B. Lewis, R.J. Yeo)	Abertillery (B. Gravenor, S. Day)	
1960	Beaufort (Keith Holl, Rhys Bowen)	Port Talbot Municipal (Jack Griffiths, Len Hill)	
1961	Mackintosh (W. Williams, R. Manfield)	Troedyrhiw (G. James, H. Richards)	
1962	Llanelli (Emrys Jenkins, Fred Thomas)	Rhymney Royal (Aeron John, Wilf John)	
1963	Gelli Park (A. Rees, C. Rees)	Barry Athletic (A. Butcher, Gareth Humphreys)	
1964	Penarth (L. Lloyd, R. Randall)	Hoovers (K. Walters, J. Williams)	
1965	Nantclydach (D. Hughes, M. Davies)	Grange (R. Crockford, J. Joslin)	
1966	Gelli Park (Maldwyn Evans, Gwyn Evans)	Gilfach Bargoed (J. Wallbank, J. James)	
1967	Gelli Park (Maldwyn Evans, Gwyn Evans)	Cardiff Athletic (B. Hawkins, P. Collins)	
1968	Penclawdd (Gwyn Howells & Leighton Jenkins)	Cardiff Athletic (B. Hawkins, P. Collins)	
1969	Aberaeron (R. Jones, V. Hubbard)	Pembroke Dock (S. Edwards, J. Sudbury)	
1970	R.T.B. Landore (Albert Ivett, F. Bishop)	Penclawdd (Gwyn Howells & Leighton Jenkins)	
1971	Beaufort (Tom Daniel, Ian Sutherland)	Pembroke (O. Davies, J, Hughes)	
1972	Talgarth (L.H.E. Thomas, L. Moses)	Brynhyfryd Carms (P. Bailey, Hugh Andrews)	
1973	Tick Tock (R. Evans & Leighton Jenkins)	Builth (J. Gittoes, A. Colcombe)	
1974	Talgarth (Eddie Thomas, Len Moses)	Kenfig Hill (Norman Harris, Ron Harris)	
1975	Tonypandy (Lyn Perkins, Spencer Wilshire)	Brynhyfryd Carms (Eric Charles & Dai Richards)	
1976	Kenfig Hill & Pyle (Norman Harris, Ron Harris)	Wattstown (R. Mays, J. Mays)	
1977	Neath Town (P. Cousins, L. Becker)	Barry Athletic (Danny Williams, Gareth Humphreys)	
1978	Tonypandy (Lyn Perkins, Spencer Wilshire)	Abergavenny (N. Mallard, C. Griffiths)	
1979	Rhymney Gwent (Dave Thomas, Alan Tippett)	Park Williams (M. Thomas, W. Miller)	
1980	Tonypandy (Lyn Perkins, Spencer Wilshire)	Aberystwyth (D.I. Pugh, J.H. Edwards)	
1981	Aberavon (John Price, Harry Price)	Gellifaelog (M. Lewis, M. Jenkins)	
1982	Rhiwbina (Peter Evans, Jock Thompson)	Bailey Park (Mark Anstey, John Anstey)	
1983	Cadoxton (Jeff Wright, Paul Webley)	Ely Valley (J. Applegate, A. Applegate)	
1984	Parc William (Gwyn Evans, Mike Davies)	Abertridwr (Les Jones, H. Green)	
1985	Pontardawe (Alan Jones, Phil Young)	Ely Valley (D. Lewis, G. Lewis)	
1986	Presteigne (John Weale, Robert Weale)	Abertridwr (K. Edwards, Les Jones)	
1987	Pontrhydyfen (Jeff Wilkins & Dai Wilkins)	Roath Park (Andrew Wason & Robert Wason)	
1988	Oakdale (B. Porter & Ron Kittley)	Abertridwr (Gareth Griffiths & Gwynmor Hopkins)	
1989	Harlequins (John Male & Mark Chard)	Pontrhydyfen (Jeff Wilkins & Dai Wilkins)	
1990	Old Landorians (Terry Sullivan & Stephen Rees)	St. Fagans (Wayne Letman & John Ellis)	
1991	Abertridwr (Jack Power & P. Brown)	Parc Howard (R. Blacklaw & Rod Hugh)	
1992	Presteigne (David Weale & Robert Weale)	Caerphilly (Martin Selway & Andrew Atwood)	
1993	Haverfordwest (Peter Howells & Gareth Jones)	Presteigne (David Weale, Robert Weale)	
1994	Sketty (R. Thomas & R. Kent)	Brynhyfryd Carms (Jonathan Forey & Malcolm Bishop)	
1995	Tonypandy (A. Withers & Spencer Wilshire)	Hirwaun (H. Probert & J. Stephens)	
1996	Caerphilly Town (Martin Selway & Andrew Atwood)	Porthcawl (K. Samuel & C. Stephens)	
1997	Presteigne (David Weale & Robert Weale)	Aberystwyth (R. Morgan & Gwynant Ellis)	
1998	Berriew (C. Jones & W. Griffiths)	Ogmore Vale (V. Jones & W. Dryden)	
1999	Brynhyfryd Carms (Peter Jenkins & Malcolm Bishop)	Abertridwr (K. Edwards, Charlie Folkes)	
2000	Ely Valley (John Applegate & Mike Prosser)	Ammanford Park (G. Thomas, W. Owen)	
2001	Cardiff (Chris Blake & Jason Greenslade)	Penhill (Neil Collet & Ryan Mountstephen)	
2002	Tenby (Paul Diment & Pat Currie)	Llandrindod Wells (D. Rogers, Ken Price)	
2003	Barry Athletic (Robert Horgan & Glyn Thomas)	Gelli Park (J. Jones & John Bartlett)	
2004	Presteigne (David Weale & Robert Weale)	Skewen (Alan Slattery & Geoff Mellor)	
2005	Barry Athletic (Glyn Thomas & Robert Horgan)	Saundersfoot (Phil Carpenter & John Roberts)	
2006	Machynlleth (Sion Jones & Andrew Fleming)	Ferndale (Lee Morgans & Martin Jones)	
2007	Presteigne (David Weale & Robert Weale)	Nixon's (Jamie Lewis & Gavin Maund)	
2008	Caerphilly (Ian Henderson & Martin Selway)	Crosskeys (Tom Hancock & Ian Slade)	
2009	Penylan (Matthew Evans & David Axon)	Tenby (Andrew Muskett & Phil Carpenter)	
2010	Llandrindod Wells (Ray Price & Ken Price)	Bridgend (Leighton Greenslade & Paul Taylor)	
2011	Pontrhydyfen (Ben Thomas & Jeff Wilkins)	Parc y Dre (Matthew Partridge & Neil Rees)	
2012	Panteg Park (John Berry & Roger Jones)	Berriew (C. Price & D. Williams)	
2013	Cardigan (Kevin James & Colin James)	Pontyclun (Gavin Fielding & Huw Morris)	
2014	Caldicot (Ryan Boots & Brian Howard)	Crosskeys (Tom Hancock & Ian Slade)	
2015	Penylan (David Harding & Mike Hart)	Llanbradach (D. Butler & R. Jackson)	
2016	Abergavenny (Gethin Hill & Matthew Vale)	Whitland (Andrew Evans & Mike John)	
2017	Caerphilly Town (Chris Doidge & Marc Wyatt)	Barry Athletic (Martin Clarke & Glyn Thomas)	
2018	Tenby (Paul Diment & Ryan Thomas)	Tenby (Peter Day & Andrew Muskett)	
2019	RTB Ebbw Vale (Lee Thomas & Jonathan Tomlinson)	Presteigne (David Weale & Robert Weale)	
2020	cancelled due to COVID-19 pandemic		
2021	Llandrindod Wells (Steve Jones & Sam Roff)	Harlequins (Jarrad Breen & Ross Owen)	
2022	Beaufort (Daniel Davies Jr. & Chris Klefenz)	Tenby (Mike Jackson & John Roberts)	
2023	Ely Valley (Chris Ashman & Phil Robins)	Barry Athletic (Glyn Thomas & Martin Clarke Squires)	
2024	Tenby (Mike Jackson & John Roberts)	RTB Ebbw Vale (Owain Dando & Steve Harris)	
2025	Llanbradach (Rhys Jackson & Carl Wood)	Briton Ferry Steel (Ben Jackson & Nicky Evans)	

=== Men's triples ===
Year	Champion	Runner-Up	Ref
1970	Ebbw Vale (R. Concreave, E. J. Jones, H. Nicholas)	Troedydhiw	
1971	RTB Landore (Brian Seldon, Len Jeremiah, Albert Ivett)	Aberystwyth	
1972	Bailey Park (J Preece, D Anstey, John Anstey)	Tenby	
1973	Milford Haven (W Phillips, J Adams, W Setterfield)	Maesteg	
1974	Barry Athletic (Len Webley, W. Webber, Gareth Humphreys)		
1975	Brynhyfryd Carms (Eric Charles, Ron Hart, Dai Richards)		
1976	Abertridwr (Trevor Mounty, Les Jones, Gwyn Roberts)		
1977	Haverfordwest (P. L. Roberts, G. Thomas, Idris Davies)		
1978	Builth Wells (A. Calcombe, T. A. Jenkins, R. Walker)		
1979	Penylan (J. King, G. James, J. Davies)		
1980	Tonypandy (K. Bolton, J. E. Thomas, Gareth Williams)		
1981	Girlings (B. Thomas, H. Jenkins, F. Brown)		
1982	Aberavon (John Price, Harry Price, Ray Hill)		
1983	Wattstown (P. Turton, D. Maundrell, C. Diamond)	Gelligaer	
1984	Aberystwyth (D. Pugh, P. Wright, A. Evans)	Bedwas (S. Griffiths, S. Thomas, R. Williams)	
1985	Carmarthen (Glan Rees, Islwyn Howells, Martyn Harries)	Harlequins (C. Barry, D. Crisp, P. Jenkins)	
1986	Pontrhydyfen (Jeff Wilkins, Haydn Mizen, Dai Wilkins)	Aberavon (Harry Price, John Price, Ray Hill)	
1987	Abertridwr (R. Hopkins, W. Pugh, J. Dacey)	Barry Central (C. Williamson, D.A. Vowels, I.C. Fraser)	
1988	Porthcawl (Richard Bowen, Steve Harris, Norman Harris)	Brynhyfryd Carms (David Kingdon, P. Bailey, Brian Kingdon)	
1989	Aberaeron (Mansel Hughes, Gordon Harris, Dil Harries)	Brynhyfryd Carms (T. Phillips, P. Jones, M. Watts)	
1990	Graig Merthyr (Wyn Matthews, Huw Thomas, Steven Thomas)	Tonypandy (Lyn Tanner, Eric John, Spencer Wilshire)	
1991	Pontrhydyfen (Eiron Thomas, Jeff Wilkins, Dai Wilkins)	Porthcawl (D. Adams, D. Bowden, M. Kent)	
1992	Tenby (V. John, Andrew Muskett, Simon Evans)	Llandrindod Wells (Ron Rowlands, D. Rogers, Ken Price)	
1993	Brynhyfryd Carms (Alan McCarley, Will Killa, Brian Kingdon)	Cwmbran (B. Shartman, A. Burgess, B. Relland)	
1994	Cardiff (Colin Dickens, Chris Blake, Robert Wason)	Presteigne (W. Phillips, Brian Weale, Robert Weale)	
1995	Ely Valley (A. Applegate, J. Applegate, P. Robins)	Tenby (Peter Day, I. Badham, M. Brace)	
1996	Pontrhydyfen (Jonathon Britton, John Britton, Brenig Powell)	Pontrhydyfen (Jeff Wilkins, Dai Wilkins, R. Davies)	
1997	Parc y Dre (Neil Rees, Brian Rees, Brian Kingdon)	Troedyrhiw (C. Flynn, K. Davies, R. Davies)	
1998	Bridgend (G. Phillips, C. Stephens, Jim Hoskins)	Parc Howard (A. Davies, D. Evans, Rod Hugh)	
1999	Penhill (Nick Davies, Andrew Wason, Mark Letman)	Old Landorians (Terry Sullivan, N. Williams, Stephen Rees)	
2000	Newport Athletic (N. Berry, D. Teague, A. Burgess)	Ammanford Park (W. James, K. Fowler, G. Thomas)	
2001	Abertridwr (K. Edwards, H. Green, J. Dacey)	Pontrhydyfen (J. Britton, Jeff Wilkins, Dai Wilkins)	
2002	Caerphilly Town (G. Harris, Marc Wyatt, W. Phillips)	Ely Valley (John Applegate, K. Parfitt, Mike Prosser)	
2003	Gilfach Bargoed (D. Trew, J. Thomas, C. Williams)	Ely Valley (Phil Robins, Chris Ashman, R. Kinder)	
2004	Glyncorrwg (N. Taylor, I. Jones, G. Simons)	Beaufort (Danny Davies, Clive Williams, Wayne Hooper)	
2005	Welshpool (Chris Williams, Danny Gough, Wayne Griffiths)	Ferndale (S. Morris, M Jones, R. Evans)	
2006	Ebbw Vale (R. Walters, R. Price, Steve Harris)	Glyncorrwg (R. Watkins, Ross Tomlinson, H. White)	
2007	Caerphilly (Gareth Jones, Ian Henderson, Martin Selway)	Ferndale (M. Harris, L. Morgans, G. Hughes)	
2008	Caerau Welfare (Paul Hooking, Mark Lewis, Mervyn Davies)	Pontrhydyfen (Ben Thomas, Dai Wilkins, Jeff Wilkins)	
2009	Glyncorrwg (Neil Taylor, Geoff Simons, Ross Tomlinson)	Harlequins (Paul Keating, Alan Sizer, John Male)	
2010	Ystradfechan (David Summers, Chris Price, Mark Thomas)	Parc-y-Dre (P Williams (Jnr), A. Evans, Neil Rees)	
2011	Barry Athletic (K. Harris, Glyn Thomas, Robert Horgan)	Ely Valley (M. Quinn, Chris Ashman, Phil Robbins)	
2012	Parc y Dre (Matthew Partridge, Stuart Turner, Neil Rees)	Harlequins (D. Prosser, Paul Carpenter, Chris Prosser)	
2013	Pontycymmer (M. Rawlin, Leighton Greenslade, Paul Taylor)	Caerphilly (Gareth Jones, Martin Selway, Ian Henderson)	
2014	Presteigne (Dale Gorman, David Weale, Robert Weale)	Beaufort (Danny Davies, Jason Foote, Daniel Davies Jr.)	
2015	Presteigne (Dale Gorman, David Weale, Robert Weale)	Gilfach Bargoed (Kristian Krocker, Paul Mullins, Carl Wood)	
2016	Ely Valley (Chris Ashman, Phil Robins, Paul Taylor)	Pontrhydyfen (Dai Wilkins, Ben Thomas, Jeff Wilkins)	
2017	Whitland (John Rees, Andrew Evans, Mike John)	Harlequins (Phil Carpenter, Jarrad Breen, Ross Owen)	
2018	Harlequins (Phil Carpenter, Jarrad Breen, Ross Owen)	Ely Valley (Phil Robbins, Paul Taylor, Chris Ashman)	
2019	Gilfach Bargoed (Carl Wood, Kristian Krocker, Carl Mounty)	Beaufort (Daniel Davies, Daniel Davies Jr., Chris Klefenz)	
2020	cancelled due to COVID-19 pandemic		
2019	Gilfach Bargoed (Carl Wood, Kristian Krocker, Carl Mounty)	Beaufort (Daniel Davies, Daniel Davies Jr.., Chris Klefenz)	
2021	Penylan (Ross Lewis, Mark Letman, Daniel Salmon)	Ely Valley (Cory Bayliss, Mark Harding, Paul Taylor)	
2022	Ely Valley (Cory Bayliss, Hugh Morris, Mark Harding)	Pontrhydyfen West (Lee Daniels, Gareth Rees, Barrie Evans)	
2023	Graig Merthyr (Ben Matthews, Mark Watkins, Wyn Matthews)	Ely Valley (Chris Roberts, Jon Berry, Paul Taylor)	
2024	Penylan (Mark Letman, Ross Lewis, Daniel Salmon)	Llandrindod Wells (Edward Jelfs, Ashley Morris, Sam Roff)	
2025	Crosskeys Welfare (Roger Harvey, Joe Mower, Daniel Davies Jr.)	Ely Valley (Mark Thomas, Joe Price, Ashley Western)	

=== Men's fours ===
Year	Champion	Runner-Up	Ref
1919	Windsor (H.G. Hill, A.E. Evans, F.W. Alty, A H. Emery)	Swansea (J. Merriman, E. Williams, H. Williams, D.A. Sutherland)	
1920	Dinas Powys (W.H. Thomas, G.W. Smith, I.B. Thomas, Robert Graham)	Grange (F. O'Leary, F. Lempiere, P. Driscoll, J.P. Williams)	
1921	Penarth (A.T. Evans, H. Snell, T. Taylor, Josh Rees)	Newport Athletic (T.W. Francis, T. Harrington, J. Monk, C.L. Perry)	
1922	Newport Athletic (H.M. Chapman, J. Whitehouse, W. Luke, G.A. Bullock)	Swansea (J. Merriman, J.E. Williams, R. McKelvie, H. Williams)	
1923	Victoria Park (J. Pratt, T. Bowker, J. Morgan, W. Whitlock)	Dinas Powys (D.L. Wilkinson, E.J.S. Hole, I.B. Thomas, T.P. Thomas)	
1924	Cardiff Athletic (W. H. Jenkins, W. David, M. Wood, J. Batstone)	Belle Vue (T. Powell, W. Soper, H.R. Trace, E. Bush)	
1925	Swansea (J. Merriman, H. Williams, Stan Weaver, D.J. Squires)	Cardiff Athletic (J. Pratt, W. David, M. Wood, J. Batstone)	
1926	Penylan (J. McGill, J. Duthie, T. Evans, L. Jones)	Belle Vue (T. Powell, W. Sergeant, R. Waterman, W.H. Green)	
1927	Swansea (Thomas Davies, J. Merriman, Stan Weaver, F. Taylor)	Cardiff (P. Lempiere, G.G. Spray, Peter Sneddon, J.P. Williams)	
1928	Pantygwydr (J. Davies, E. Holdsworth, D. Parry, E. Hill)	Windsor (E. Parry, S. Shepherd, A.E. Fides, G.A. Chambers)	
1929	Windsor (D.J. Williams, P.E. Cadle, E. Parry, G.A. Chambers)	Mackintosh (S.F. Wide, W. Edwards, A. Mackenzie, S.H. Travers)	
1930	Roath Park (J. Thomas, G. Bishop, G. Whyte, C.C. Johnson)	Pantygwydr (Trevor Toms, A.W. Phillips, S. Howell, D.J. Squires)	
1931	Pantygwydr (Trevor Toms, T. Howell, F. Reed, E. Hill)	Splott (C. Conway, R. James, J. Payne, J. Williams)	
1932	Barry Central (W. Abbott, G.E. Martin, E. Jones, E. Thompson)	Dowlais (J. B. Jones, S. J. Hoskins, W.J. Bowen, J. Llewellyn)	
1933	Swansea (Thomas Davies, H. Williams, W. Mitchell, Stan Weaver)	Aberbargoed (J. Evans, H. Roper, E. Mason, W. Walters)	
1934	Wattstown (R. Williams, William G. Kent, Michael Manweiler, Isaac Rees)	Penhill (J.W. Millington, A.J. Jones, W.G. Thomas, Albie Brown)	
1935	Grange (J. Maplestone, P. Lempiere, W. Davies, J. Maile)	Belle Vue, Newport (I.T. Coakham, W. Powell, I. Johns, T.D. Trowbridge)	
1936	Trelyn Park (W.H. Harris, T.S. Foster, A. Jones, J. Fine)	Barry Romilly (A. Eamor, H.J. Roberts, A.H. Lawrence, T. McG. Hole)	
1937	Port Talbot Municipal (Jack Griffiths, J. Miles, J. B. Davies, Len Hill)	Abertridwr (J. Llewellyn, R. Evans, R. Jenkins, G. Davies)	
1938	Dinam Park (E. Lewis, E. Evans, I.T. Jones, W.D. Jones)	Oakdale (W.J. Jones, T. Lewis, R. Briggs, C. Weager)	
1939	Port Talbot Municipal (Jack Griffiths, J. Miles, J. B. Davies, Len Hill)	Trelyn Park (W.H. Harris, T. Foster, A. Jones, F. Fine)	
1940	Abertridwr (G. Davies, H. Hughes, Les Jones, J. Phillips)	Ystrad Mynach (D. Hazzelby, T. Owen, R. Jones, W. Meyrick)	
1941	Port Talbot Municipal (Jack Griffiths, A. Jenkins, T. W. Jones, Len Hill)	Bridgend (H. Cook, W. Ray, T. Thomas, E.W. Davies)	
1942	Abertillery (J. Milman, C. Toomer, S. Day, Teddy Jones)	Llanelli (D. Hugh, B. Jones, J. Parry, W. Phillips)	
1943	Rhymney Royal (A. Jones, I. Thomas, Sgt. J. Probert, B.A. Jones)	Sketty (G. Williams, G. Hogg, A. Delve, D.T. Williams)	
1944	Pontrhydyfen (V. Thomas, D.H. Griffiths, G. Rees, D. Prosser)	Rhymney Gwent (J. Saunders, B. Richards, E. Evans, Wilf John)	
1945	Abertillery (R. Cornwall, C. Toomer, S. Day, Teddy Jones)	Tonypandy (R. Williams, W. Williams, T. Williams, L. Williams)	
1946	Abertillery (R. Cornwall, C. Toomer, S. Day, Teddy Jones)	Ystradgynlais (D. Lewis, G. Rees, M.D. Jones, E.G. Jones)	
1947	Dafen (W.D. Ford, G. Morgan, P.D. Thomas, Alfred Thomas)	Fairoak (J. Camp, E.E. Jones, H. Bethel, J. Manning)	
1948	Brynhyfryd Neath (I. John, K. Rees, W. Powell, Evan Rees)	Cyfarthfa Castle (J.H. Hayward, O. Thomas H. Price, J. Williams)	
1949	Victoria Park (T. Griffiths, C. Vokes, B. Kingston, C.W.J. Watts)	Gilfach Bargoed (J. Opel, R.V. Collins, Idris Miles, D.J. Amwel Jones)	
1950	Newport Athletic (H. Ravalde, H.T. Ewings, A. Kirk, C. Standfast)	Llandeilo (T.H. Rogers, W.M. Parsons, E.D. Thomas, D.J. Rees)	
1951	Cardiff (I. Davies, J. Budd, T. King, F.L. Cottie)	Talgarth (L. Pugh, R. Martin, R.W.E. Davies, D.L. Williams)	
1952	Merthyr West End (T.J. Bord, D.W. Davies, O. Thomas, H. Maylott)	Llandeilo (E.R. Ellis, E.D. Thomas, W. Parsons, D.J. Rees)	
1953	Penygraig Belle Vue (R. Williams, D. Morgan, W.B.Williams, T.R. Williams)	Port Talbot Municipal (E. Dummer, Evan Jones, Jack Griffiths, Len Hill)	
1954	Newbridge (A.H. Pearce, W. Preece, H. Edwards, W. McCombie)	Parc Wern Swansea (W. Read, F. Taylor, C. Dowdle, William Glyn John)	
1955	Melyn United (J.R. Davies, J. Baker, K. Rees, A. Rees)	Pontymister Welfare (I. Jones, B. Jones, I.T. Griffin, Bernie Williams)	
1956	Gelli Park (John Morgan Evans, Mostyn Jenkins, Mansel Coleman, David Coleman)	Barry Athletic (R. Thomas, R. Evans, Idwal Thomas, Tom Yeoman)	
1957	Port Talbot Municipal (Danny Prosser, Evan Jones, Jack Griffiths, Len Hill)	Cadoxton (P. Evans, A. Butcher, W. Archer, D. Ashton)	
1958	Victoria Swansea (F. Bishop, W.G. John, F.L. Taylor, S.J. Perman)	Barry Athletic (R. Evans, R. Thomas, J. Thomas, L. Andrews)	
1959	Llandaff Fields (A. James, T.H. Griffiths, Keith Rowlands, Tom Rowlands)	Gelli Park (Gwyn Evans, Mostyn Jenkins, D.J. Mantle, John Morgan Evans)	
1960	Abergavenny (Claude Stephens, Lynn Probert, Tom Griffiths, Albert Evans)	Penygraig Belle Vue (G. John, J. Howells, D. Howells, V. Lowrie)	
1961	Gelli Park (Gwyn Evans, Mostyn Jenkins, D.J. Mantle, John Morgan Evans)	Penarth (R. Mead, G. Thomas, E. Mead, L. Lloyd)	
1962	Port Talbot Municipal (Evan Jones, Ray Hill, Danny Prosser, Len Hill)	Cwmbran (L. Brinkworth, W. Hughes, C. Roberts, Roy Jones)	
1963	Barry Athletic (John Russell Evans, Jim Morgan, Ron Thomas, Gareth Humphreys)	Penygraig Belle Vue (E. James, Ll. Williams, D. Morgans, T.R. Williams)	
1964	Brecon (R.J. Hudman, D. Musto, F.L. Williams, C.L. Jones)	Ebbw Vale (Harold Alsop, F.G. Graddon, W. Muislade, T. Jones)	
1965	Rhiwbina (T. Roberts, W. D. Jones, R. Bending, Jock Thompson)	Troedyrhiw (B. Lewis, S. Peters, D.G. James, H. Richards)	
1966	Llansawel (E. Colwill, G. Tallamy, D. Reynolds, G.Cox)	Llanbradach (S. Thomas, R. Tudor, T. Tovey, E. John)	
1967	Penclawdd (Gwyn Howells, E.J. Davies, D. Palmer, Leighton Jenkins)	Cardiff Athletic (Malcolm Gilmore, P.E. Ridd, B. Hawkins, W. Dacey)	
1968	Caerphilly (F. Jones, E. Petty, F. Pipe, H. Baynton)	Troedyrhiw (B. Broad, G. Jones, W. Richards, H. Richards)	
1969	Barry Athletic (John Russell Evans, Jim Morgan, Ron Thomas, Gareth Humphreys)	Milford Haven (J. John, R. Clarke, R. Thomas, R. Yolland)	
1970	Llandrindod Wells (W. Richards, E. Spooner, J. Palmer, Brian Maund)	Thomastown (W. Morgan, H. Mackinney, E. Williams, R. Jones)	
1971	Brynhyfryd Carms (Colin Rees, Edward Oliver, Hugh Andrews, Dai Richards)	Splott (H. Rowe, D.Mulford, S. Colston, V. Harris)	
1972	Brynhyfryd Carms (Colin Rees, Edward Oliver, John Thomas, Dai Richards)	Rhiwbina (L. Hughes, E. Williams, Peter Evans, Jock Thompson)	
1973	Ammanford (Danny Price, Peter Williams, R. John, Gareth Morris)	ICI Pontypool (N. Powell, A. Powell, R. Wood, V. Matthews)	
1974	Llanbradach (Arthur Young, Ellis Stanbury, A. Marshall, R. Young)	Troedyrhiw (B. Broad, G. Jones, G. Jomes, W. Richards)	
1975	Bryn Road Swansea (R.A. Jones, R.J. Keeble, R. Williams, V.J. Porter)	Barry Athletic (L. O'Keele, C. James, Len Webley, John Russell Evans)	
1976	Barry Athletic (G. Storey, W.J. Webber, Danny Williams, Gareth Humphreys)	Penylan (C. Stephenson, J. Calnan, G. James, J. Davies)	
1977	Tonypandy (J. Dally, G.E. Evans, G. Wiltshire, D.J. Evans)	Swansea Vale (T. Evans, J. Lobb, M. Jenkins, G. Pierce)	
1978	Aberystwyth (A. Jones, G. Evans, A. Galbraith, E. Evans)	Abergavenny Ave (D. Whistance, K. Boddy, R. Poynter, V. Heritage)	
1979	Troedyrhiw (P. Fulilove, B. Lewis, C. Strange, R. Morgan)	Cwmbran (A. Cooper, Aeron John, J.T. Thompson, B. Relland)	
1980	Dinas Powis (Hugh Meddins, G. Bishop, A.R. Dibble, Len Webley)	Pontrhydyfen (B. Davies, J. Britton, Dai Wilkins, Haydn Mizen)	
1981	Abertridwr (W. Plumley, Charlie Folkes, W. H. Thomas, W. E. Pugh)	Barry Athletic (B. Pycroft, R. Cowling, Peter Austerberry, John Russell Evans)	
1982	Abertridwr (Gwynmor Hopkins, Gareth Griffiths, P. Morgan, Trevor Mounty)	Brynhyfryd Carms (Brian Kingdon, N. Bevan, R. Hart, C. Rees)	
1983	Caldicot (R. Bryant, D. Pritchard, K. Nash, John Haddock)	Penygraig (R. Mills, D. Robins, Ken Dee, W. Parker)	
1984	Presteigne (Brian Weale, David Weale, W. Weale, Robert Weale)	Barry Plastics (M. Morgan, H. Hawkins, L. Durham, E. Roberts)	
1985	Cardiff Athletic (Malcolm Gilmore, B. Hazell, G. Hazell, R. Pullen)	Bridgend (D. Thomas, G. Proce, I. Davies, W. Thomas)	
1986	Neath Town (Tony Matthews, Jim Matthews, Will Matthews, Ray Matthews)	Penarth Belle Vue (S. Marsh, R. Janes, J. Elliot, A. Mathias)	
1987	Aberystwyth (G. Ellis, G Griffith, R. Morgan, D. Pugh)	Brecon (R. Ahrens, E. Phillips, K. Davies, Les Thomas)	
1988	Abergavenny (John Evans, Gethin Hill, John Anstey, Mark Anstey)	Brecon (R. Ahrens, Malcolm Padmore, K. Davies, Les Thomas)	
1989	Abergavenny (John Evans, Gethin Hill, John Anstey, Mark Anstey)	Cam Gears (E. Edwards, G. Herbert, P. Rees, W. Thomas)	
1990	Abertridwr (Gwynmor Hopkins, Gareth Griffiths, Gwyn Roberts, Trevor Mounty)	Tonypandy (Roy Thomas, Mike Young, Vic Dimond, Lyn Perkins)	
1991	Abertridwr (R. Hopkins, Jack Power, Howard Green, John Dacey)	Brynmawr (S. Harris, A. Lewis, R. Hapgood, A. Williams)	
1992	Presteigne (Brian Weale, Stuart Weale, David Weale, Robert Weale)	Lampeter (T. Edwards, I. Watkin, D. Evans, J. Edwards)	
1993	Pontrhydyfen (Jonathon Britton, G. Rosser, John Britton, Haydn Mizen)	Brynmawr (P. Carey, A. Rigby, E. George, R. Price)	
1994	Cardigan (Les Culley, Terry Thomas, John Goodwin, Richard Bowen)	Penhill (E. Edwards, J. Bullock, Mark Letman, Keith Rowlands)	
1995	Haverfordwest (P. John, P. Howells, R. Fairhurst, G. Jones)	Brynhyfryd Carms (Jonathan Forey, W. Killa, M. Watts, Malcolm Bishop)	
1996	Presteigne (Brian Weale, Stuart Weale, David Weale, Robert Weale)	Brynhyfryd Carms (P. Jenkins, A. Evans, M. Skinner, A. Evans)	
1997	Ely Village (C. Ashman, R. James, Ashley Western, P. Robins)	Machynlleth (N. Fleming, Barry Fleming, Andrew Fleming, Philip Rowlands)	
1998	Brynhyfryd Carms (Wyndham Rees, Steve Evans, Martin Watts, Malcolm Bishop)	Ystradfechan (D. Morgan, M. Davies, C. Price, J. Pearce)	
1999	Tenby (Peter Day, Paul Diment, Andrew Muskett, Pat Currie)	Brynhyfryd Carms (W. Rees, S. Evans, M. Watts, Malcolm Bishop)	
2000	Ferndale (R. Evans, M. Harris, Gareth Hughes, P. Jones)	Brynhyfryd Carms (W. Rees, H. Johns, M. Watts, Malcolm Bishop)	
2001	Presteigne (Brian Weale, Stuart Weale, David Weale, Robert Weale)	Ely Valley (M. Harrison, A. Applegate, John Applegate, Mike Prosser)	
2002	Penylan (Russell Wall, Brian Rich, David Axon, David Harding)	Ferndale (R. Evans, M. Harris, P. Jones, G. Hughes)	
2003	Presteigne (Brian Weale, Stuart Weale, David Weale, Robert Weale)	Welshpool (C. Williams, P. A. Lewis, D. Gough, W. Griffiths)	
2004	Presteigne (Brian Weale, Stuart Weale, David Weale, Robert Weale)	Bridgend (H. Jenkins, K. Frankton, A. Hunter, Jim Hoskins)	
2005	Ferndale (Mark Jones, Martin Jones, Lee Morgans, Gareth Hughes)	Gelli Park (L. Kirby, D Pritchard, M. Evans, Spencer Wilshire)	
2006	Caerphilly Town (Gareth Jones, Ian Henderson, Marc Wyatt, Martin Selway)	Saundersfoot (P. Carpenter, J. Baggott, P Diment, J. Roberts)	
2007	Ammanford Park (Wayne Owen, Keiran Peregrine, Gareth Thomas, Aled Howells)	Dinas Powis (H. Meddins, M. Ackland, A. Meddins, Jason Greenslade)	
2008	Machynlleth (David Rowlands, Mark Gaskell, Barry Fleming, Andrew Fleming)	Aberavon (J. Thomas, Harry Price, John Price, G. Davies)	
2009	Bridgend (C. Stephens, D. McCormick, D. Parkhouse, Paul Taylor)	Crosskeys (S. Bushell, N. Bushell, A. Bushell, Ian Slade)	
2010	Presteigne (Brian Weale, Stuart Weale, David Weale, Robert Weale)	Barry Athletic (L. Stanley, B. Parish, C. Wright, Chris Blake)	
2011	Presteigne (Brian Weale, Stuart Weale, David Weale, Robert Weale)	Beaufort (J. Mower, Neil Carter, Clive Williams, Darren O'Callaghan)	
2012	Pontrhydyfen (Ben Thomas, Lee Daniels, Dai Wilkins, Jeff Wilkins)	Tenby (Luke Guymer, Peter Day, Craig Guymer, Paul Diment)	
2013	Pontrhydyfen (Ben Thomas, Lee Daniels, Dai Wilkins, Jeff Wilkins)	Barry Athletic (L. Peters, K. Harris, Robert Horgan, Chris Blake)	
2014	Graig Merthyr (Ben Matthews, Lee Walker, Steve Thomas, Wyn Matthews)	RTB Ebbw Vale (R. Underwood, L. Thomas, Owain Dando, Jonathan Tomlinson)	
2015	RTB Ebbw Vale (Steve Toms, Roger Silcox, Robert Price, Steve Batten)	Merthyr West End (Andrew Jones, Albert Moule, Colin Rees, Craig Maycock)	
2016	Presteigne (Brian Weale, Stuart Weale, David Weale, Robert Weale)	Carmarthen (J Morgans, Harries, P Williams, C Davies)	
2017	Harlequins (Jordan Davies, Phil Carpenter, Jarrad Breen, Ross Owen)	Penylan (R. Jackson, Mike Hart, Damian Doubler, Daniel Salmon)	
2018	Beaufort (Daniel Davies, Roger Jones, Daniel Davies Jr., Chris Klefenz)	Merthyr West End (Lee Morgan, Nicky Minett, Nathan Scoot, Phil Westcott)	
2019	Llandrindod Wells (Ed Jelfs, Ashley Morris, Luke Harwood, Ryan Atkins)	Pontyclun Athletic (Kyle Mainwaring, Huw Morris, Nigel Banfield, Gavyn Fielding)	
2020	cancelled due to COVID-19 pandemic		
2021	Penylan (Damian Doubler, Mike Hart, Richard Morgan, David Harding)	Harlequins (Jordan Davies, Phil Carpenter, Jarrad Breen, Ross Owen)	
2022	Penylan (Ross Lewis, Gary Cox, Mark Letman, Daniel Salmon)	Merthyr W.E. (Graham Laing, Ethan Humphries, Huw Davies, Lee Morgan)	
2023	Graig Merthyr (Mark Driscoll, Jake Hancock, Gavin Rees & Jordan Driscoll)	Cardiff (Brian Sage, G. Williams, Luke Magee, Ryan Mountstephen)	
2024	Harelquins (Jordan Davies, Lee Morgans, Jarrad Breen, Ross Owen)	Barry Athletic (Dave Townsend, Scott Howell, Peter Rogers, Dean Rees, Glyn Thomas)	
2025	Crosskeys Welfare (Roger Harvey, Ian Slade, Joe Mower, Daniel Davies Jr.)	Havelock Park (Chris Spriggs, Darren Griffiths, Greg Davies, Mark Jones)	

==== Most titles ====
Event	Name
singles	Teddy Jones (4), Robert Weale (3), Kevin James (3)
pairs	Robert Weale (5), Spencer Wilshire (4), David Weale (4)
triples	seven players (2)
fours	Robert Weale (9), David Weale (9), Brian Weale (9), Stuart Weale (8)

=== Women's singles ===
Year	Champion	Ref
1933	Mrs C.Insell (Newport)	
1934	Mabel 'Brownie' Brown (Newport)	
1935	Mabel 'Brownie' Brown (Newport)	
1936	Mrs W.Hopkins (Merthyr)	
1937	W.Harris (Skewen)	
1938	D.Porter (Beechwood)	
1939	Mrs M.Thomas (Llandrindod Wells)	
1946	E.Howells (Port Talbot)	
1947	E.Howells (Port Talbot)	
1948	E.Howells (Port Talbot)	
1949	H.Webber (Porthcawl)	
1950	L.Davies (Beechwood)	
1953	L.Webster (Mackintosh)	
1954	E.Thomas (Port Talbot)	
1955	E.Thomas (Port Talbot)	
1956	Mrs Lane (Pengelli)	
1957	E.Evans (Abergavenny)	
1958	E.Howells (Port Talbot)	
1959	B.Howells (Port Talbot)	
1960	A.Parkhouse (Victoria Bowls Club)	
1961	C.Leek (Pontypool)	
1962	Mair Jones (Pengelli)	
1963	Lilian Nicholas (Ebbw Vale)	
1964	Lilian Nicholas (Ebbw Vale)	
1965	Margaret Pomeroy (Howard Gardens)	
1966	W.Gilmore (Grange)	
1967	Lilian Nicholas (Ebbw Vale)	
1968	E.Morgan (Porth)	
1969	Margaret Pomeroy (Howard Gardens)	
1970	Lilian Nicholas (Ebbw Vale)	
1971	Lilian Nicholas (Ebbw Vale)	
1972	Linda Parker (Knighton)	
1973	Margaret Pomeroy (Howard Gardens)	
1974	M.Laverty (Rhiwbina)	
1975	E.Howells (Port Talbot)	
1976	Margaret Pomeroy (Sophia Gardens)	
1977	Dilys Hemming (Barry Plastics)	
1978	Lilian Nicholas (Nevill)	
1979	Eileen Thomas (Port Talbot)	
1980	Janet Ackland (Penarth Belle Vue)	
1981	Margaret Pomeroy (Sophia Gardens)	
1982	Lilian Nicholas (Nevill)	
1983	Julie Davies (Port Talbot)	
1984	Betty Morgan (Llandrindod Wells)	
1985	Julie Davies (Port Talbot)	
1986	Betty Morgan (Llandrindod Wells)	
1987	Janet Ackland (Penarth Belle Vue)	
1988	Julie Davies (Port Talbot)	
1989	Rita Jones (Gilfach Bargoed)	
1990	Eileen Thomas (Port Talbot)	
1991	Betty Morgan (Llandrindod Wells)	
1992	Julie Davies (Port Talbot)	
1993	Margaret Rosser (Skewen)	
1994	Betty Morgan (Llandrindod Wells)	
1995	Nina Shipperlee (Whitchurch)	
1996	Ann Dainton (Barry Plastics)	
1997	Betty Morgan (Llandrindod Wells)	
1998	Ann Sutherland (Croesyceiliog)	
1999	Hazel Wilson (Merthyr Tydfil)	
2000	Kathy Pearce (Berriew)	
2001	Caroline Taylor (Berriew)	
2002	Betty Morgan (Llandrindod Wells)	
2003	Caroline Taylor (Berriew)	
2004	Enys Davies (Hoover, Merthyr Tydfil)	
2005	Jackie Hopkins (Abertridwr)	
2006	Kathy Pearce (Berriew)	
2007	Kathy Pearce (Berriew)	
2008	Denise Morlan (Tridwr)	
2009	Carol Difford (Gilfach Bargoed)	
2010	Wendy Price (Llandrindod Wells)	
2011	Caroline Taylor (Berriew)	
2012	Jess Williams (Llandrindod Wells)	
2013	Lisa Forey (Stradey Ladies)	
2014	Emma Woodcock (Cardiff)	
2015	Judith Wason (Cardiff)	
2016	Laura Daniels (Brynhyfryd)	
2017	Jess Williams (Llandrindod Wells)	
2018	Laura Daniels (Brynhyfryd)	
2019	Melanie Thomas (Lampeter)	
	2020, 2021 & 2022 cancelled due to the COVID-19 pandemic	
2023	Katie Thomas (Whitland)	
2024	Bethan Russ (Port Talbot)	
2025	Ysie White (Tenby)	

=== Women's pairs ===
Year	Champion	Ref
1949	Pontypridd	
1953	Pontypridd	
1954	Port Talbot	
1955	Port Talbot	
1956	Pontypridd	
1957	Thomastown	
1958	Penarth Windsor	
1959	Port Talbot	
1960	Port Talbot	
1961	Penarth Windsor	
1962	Port Talbot	
1963	Rumney Gardens	
1964	Rumney Gardens	
1965	Ebbw Vale	
1966	Evans & Thomas (Romilly Park)	
1967	Bowen & Jones (Ebbw Vale)	
1968	Wright & Baylis (Beechwood)	
1969	Joan Osborne & Margaret Pomeroy (Howard Gardens)	
1970	Hemmings & Breed (Dinas Powis)	
1971	Atkins & Hutchings (Penarth Windsor)	
1972	E Chapman & W Thatcher (Rumney Gardens)	
1973	Evelyn Williams & K Lake (Port Talbot)	
1974	Evelyn Williams & K Lake (Port Talbot)	
1975	Shirley Proctor & Margaret Pomeroy (Sophia Gardens)	
1976	J Price & E Owen (Knighton)	
1977	M Davies & D Thorne (Llandovery)	
1978	J Watts & J Pipe (Pontypool)	
1979	Ann Dainton & Barbara Stanton (Barry Plastics)	
1980	Mills & Betty Morgan (Llandrindod Wells)	
1981	Ann Dainton & Barbara Stanton (Barry Plastics)	
1982	Shirley Proctor & Margaret Pomeroy (Sophia Gardens)	
1983	Lilian Nicholas & J Howells (Nevill)	
1984	Joan Ricketts & Myra Jenkins (Bailey Park)	
1985	Shirley Proctor & Margaret Pomeroy (Sophia Gardens)	
1986	Linda Evans & Eileen Thomas (Port Talbot)	
1987	Mo Jones & Doreen Rowlands (Sophia Gardens)	
1988	Shirley Proctor & Margaret Pomeroy (Sophia Gardens)	
1989	Marilyn Jones & Jeanne Evans (Merthyr West End)	
1990	Marlene Burns & Mair Marquis (Tenby)	
1991	Pam John & Gill Miles (Sophia Gardens)	
1992	Linda Evans & Eileen Thomas (Port Talbot)	
1993	Betty Morgan & Jenny Davies (Llandrindod Wells)	
1994	Betty Morgan & Jenny Davies (Llandrindod Wells)	
1995	Betty Morgan & Jenny Davies (Llandrindod Wells)	
1996	Barbara Stanton & Ann Dainton (Barry Plastics)	
1997	Mary Davies & Doreen Rowlands (Sophia Gardens)	
1998	Anne Davies & Nina Shipperlee (Whitchurch)	
1999	Anne Davies & Nina Shipperlee (Whitchurch)	
2000	Audrey Mullins & Rita Jones (Gilfach Bargoed)	
2001	C. Grimwade & S.Jones (New Lodge)	
2002	Jenny Davies & Betty Morgan (Llandrindod Wells)	
2003	Norma O'Sullivan & Marian Gwynne (Hoover)	
2004	Jealian Willis & Wendy Morris (Port Talbot)	
2005	Mel Viles & Mair Jones (Hoover)	
2006	Pam John & Gill Miles (Sophia Gardens)	
2007	Linda Woodcock & Yvonne Lloyd (Barry Athletic)	
2008	Viv Woodcock & Ann Lewis (Saundersfoot)	
2009	Mary-Clare McCulloch & Kelly Packwood (Garndiffaith)	
2010	Wendy Price & Betty Morgan (Llandrindod Wells)	
2011	Wendy Price & Betty Morgan (Llandrindod Wells)	
2012	Lisa Forey & Barbara Griffiths (Stradey Ladies)	
2013	Anna Greenway & Carol Difford (Gilfach Bargoed)	
2014	Jess Sims & Laura Price (Llandrindod Wells)	
2015	Lisa Forey & Barbara Griffiths (Llanelli)	
2016	Alis Butten & Anwen Butten (Lampeter)	
2017	Lisa Forey & Barbara Griffiths (Stradey)	
2018	Stephanie Amos & Gemma Amos (Saundersfoot)	
2019	Wendy Price & Betty Morgan (Llandrindod Wells)	
	2020, 2021 & 2022 cancelled due to the COVID-19 pandemic	
2023	Alis Butten & Anwen Butten (Lampeter)	
2024	Lauren Gowen & Tracy Gowen (Cardiff)	
2025	Isabel Jones & Caroline Taylor (Berriew)	

=== Women's triples ===
Year	Champion	Ref
1952	Hettie Adams, Rose Archard (Pontypridd)	
1954	Mackintosh	
1955	Mackintosh	
1956	Newport	
1957	Port Talbot	
1959	Port Talbot	
1960	Porth	
1961	Penarth Windsor	
1962	Ebbw Vale	
1963	Ebbw Vale	
1965	Rumney Gardens	
1967	Porth	
1968	Ebbw Vale	
1969	Victoria Bowls Club (Swansea)	
1970	Pengelli	
1971	D Evans, I Bishop, B Staunton (Barry Plastics)	
1972	A Thomas, Joan Osborne, M Lewis (Howard Gardens)	
1973	J Watts, E Hill, J Pipe (Pontypool)	
1974	E Chapman, J Pryor, W Thatcher (Rumney Gardens)	
1975	N Hooper, M Buchanan, J Mills (Porth)	
1976	D Evans, Ann Dainton, Dilys Hemming (Barry Plastics)	
1977	J Griffiths, J Howells, Lilian Nicholas (Nevill)	
1978	N Williams, C Williams, Janet Ackland (Penarth Belle Vue)	
1979	Shirley Proctor, D Kingaby, Margaret Pomeroy (Sophia Gardens)	
1980	Julie Davies, Linda Evans, Eileen Thomas (Port Talbot)	
1981	Julie Davies, Linda Evans, Eileen Thomas (Port Talbot)	
1982	M Evans, C Gwilt, Linda Parker (Knighton)	
1983	J Evans, Myra Jenkins, Joan Ricketts (Bailey Park)	
1984	N Hopkins, P Price, J Mills (Porth)	
1985	Shirley Proctor, Maureen Jones, Margaret Pomeroy (Sophia Gardens)	
1986	Val Howell, Fay Lewis, Pam Griffiths (Merthyr West End)	
1987	Gill Miles, Joan Osborne, Marian Greenslade (Sophia Gardens)	
1988	Pam John, Eleanor Schmidt, Doreen Rowlands (Sophia Gardens)	
1989	Joan Evans, Brenda Mills, Betty Morgan (Llandrindod Wells)	
1990	Shirley King, Doreen Rowlands, Mary Davies (Llandrindod Wells)	
1991	Shirley King, Doreen Rowlands, Mary Davies (Llandrindod Wells)	
1992	W Evans, M Rees, G Watkins (Llanaswel)	
1993	Shirley Proctor, Pam John, Margaret Pomeroy (Sophia Gardens)	
1994	L.Taylor, S.Smith, J.Wason (Taffs Well)	
1995	E.Brown, B.Stanton, Ann Dainton (Barry Plastics)	
1996	P Coburn, H Mogford, D Lewis (Brynmawr)	
1997	Jealian Willis, Wendy Morris, Linda Evans (Port Talbot BC)	
1998	Hazel Wilson, Isabel Jones, Kathy Pearce (Berriew)	
1999	Margaret Hopkins, Jenny Davies, Betty Morgan (Llandrindod Wells)	
2000	Anne Greenway, Audrey Mullins, Rita Jones (Gilfach Bargoed)	
2001	Shirley King, Doreen Rowlands, Mary Davies (Llandrindod Wells)	
2002	Margaret Hospkins, Jenny Davies, Betty Morgan (Llandrindod Wells)	
2003	Marianne Acreman, Pauline Dando, Joyce Thornton (Llantrisant)	
2004	Audrey Mullins, Carol Difford, Anne Greenway (Gilfach Bargoed)	
2005	M. Smith, J. Griffiths, Pat Bignall (Tridwr)	
2006	Audrey Mullins, Carol Gifford, Anne Greenaway (Gilfach Bargoed)	
2007	Hazel Wilson, Isabel Jones, Kathy Pearce (Berriew)	
2008	Jean Hartley, Pam John, Gill Miles (Cardiff)	
2009	Sarah Phillips, Betty Morgan, Jessica Williams (Llandrindod Wells)	
2010	Jealian Willis, Wendy Morris, Linda Evans (Port Talbot BC)	
2011	Ann Lewis, Ceris Hewlings, Kath Blayney (Saundersfoot)	
2012	Melanie Thomas, Carolyn James, Anwen Butten (Lampeter)	
2013	Bethan Russ, Hannah Thomas, Carla Dunkley (Port Talbot)	
2014	Kayleigh Morris, Shirley King, Wendy Price (Llandrindod Wells)	
2015	Kayleigh Morris, Shirley King, Wendy Price (Llandrindod Wells)	
2016	Kath Samuel, Mary-Clare MCulloch, Kelly Packwood (Pontyfelin)	
2017	Melanie Thomas, Carolyn James, Anwen Butten (Lampeter)	
2018	Gemma Amos, Stephanie Amos, Ann Lewis (Saundersfoot)	
2019	Debbie Jones, Pam John, Gill Miles (Cardiff)	
	2020, 2021 & 2022 cancelled due to the COVID-19 pandemic	
2023	Sophie Gittins, Emma Gittins, Caroline Taylor (Berriew)	
2024	Alis Butten, Carolyn James, Anwen Butten (Lampeter)	
2025	Hazel Wilson, Isabel Jones, Kathy Pearce (Berriew)	

=== Women's Fours ===
Year	Champion	Ref
1933	Thomastown	
1934	Thomastown	
1935	Skewen	
1936	Abercynon	
1937	Skewen	
1938	Llandindrod Wells	
1939	Mabel 'Brownie' Brown (Newport)	
1946	Hettie Adams (Pontypridd)	
1947	Llandindrod Wells	
1948	Penarth	
1949	Llandaff	
1950	Port Talbot	
1953	Cwmbran	
1954	Mackintosh	
1955	Cwmbran	
1956	Port Talbot	
1957	Mackintosh	
1958	Penarth Windsor	
1959	Gertrude Savegar (Nevill, Abergavenny)	
1960	Gertrude Savegar (Nevill, Abergavenny)	
1961	Porth	
1962	Pengelli	
1963	Penarth Belle Vue	
1964	Pengelli	
1965	Bridgend	
1966	Grange	
1967	Pengelli	
1968	Beechwood	
1969	Port Talbot	
1970	Rumney Gardens	
1971	Porth	
1972	Evelyn Williams, K Lake, E Howells, Eileen Thomas (Port Talbot)	
1973	Talbot, P Curtis, B Martin, I Radford (Penarth Belle Vue)	
1974	Hooper, Mills, James, Morgan	
1975	Sophia Gardens	
1976	P Curtis, J Downes, I Radford, M James (Penarth Belle Vue)	
1977	J Evans, E Bufton, B Mills, Betty Morgan (Llandrindod Wells)	
1978	E Hill, P Skinner, J Watts, J Pipe (Pontypool)	
1979	J.Davies, L.Evans, E.Williams, E.Thomas (Port Talbot)	
1980	Sophia Gardens	
1981	A.Barbarini, J.Downs, M.James, R.Rdford (Penarth Belle Vue)	
1982	J.Scoular, G.Gould, J.Whalley, D.Hemmings (Penhill)	
1983	J.Evans, J.Checketts, B.Mills Betty Morgan (Llandrindod Wells)	
1984	F.Humphries, A.Smith, J.Simmons, Nina Shipperlee (Whitchurch)	
1985	Gill Miles, Shirley Proctor, Joan Osborne, Margaret Pomeroy (Sophia Gardens)	
1986	Lil Mayers, Doreen Evans, Margaret Rosser, Mary Hughes (Skewen)	
1987	Margaret Rosser, Doreen Evans, Lil Mayers, Mary Hughes (Skewen)	
1988	Daisy Wallace, Doreen Hall, Adah John, Janet Ackland (Penarth Belle Vue)	
1989	Daisy Wallace, Doreen Hall, Adah John, Janet Ackland (Penarth Belle Vue)	
1990	Pam Skinner, Val Mitchell, Joy Watts, Louise Thomas (Pontypool)	
1991	Audrey Mullins, Patricia Czarnecki, M Price, Rita Jones (Gilfach Bargoed)	
1992	Audrey Mullins, Patricia Czarnecki, M Price, Rita Jones (Gilfach Bargoed)	
1993	Jenny Davies, Doreen Rowlands, Mary Davies, Betty Morgan (Llandrindod Wells)	
1994	Lil Mayers, Mary Hughes, Margaret Rosser, J.Davies (Skewen)	
1995	Jealian Willis, E.Thomas, Wendy Morris, Linda Evans (Port Talbot)	
1996	Marian Greenslade, Dorothy Kendall, Pam John, Gill Miles (Sophia Gardens)	
1997	Marianne Acreman, Marilyn Davies, Merle Cox, Joyce Thornton (Llantrisant BC)	
1998	Mary Davies, Jenny Davies, Doreen Rowlands, Betty Morgan (Llandrindod Wells)	
1999	Mary Davies, Jenny Davies, Doreen Rowlands, Betty Morgan (Llandrindod Wells)	
2000	Jealian Willis, R Morgan, Wendy Morris, Linda Evans (Port Talbot)	
2001	Tessa Dickens, Marian Greenslade, Pam John, Gill Miles (Sophia Gardens)	
2002	Caroline Taylor, Hazel Wilson, Isabel Jones, Kathy Pearce (Berriew)	
2003	Marian Gwynne, Melivina Viles, Norma O'Sullivan, Mair Jones (Hoover)	
2004	Marian Gwynne, Melivina Viles, Norma O’Sullivan, Mair Jones (Hoover)	
2005	Ann Sutherland, Chris Headley, Barbara Thomas, Jan Hine (Croesyceiliog)	
2006	Caroline Taylor, Hazel Wilson, Isabel Jones, Kathy Pearce (Berriew)	
2007	Marian Gwynne, Mel Viles, Norma O'Sullivan, Mair Jones (Hoover)	
2008	Tessa Dickens, Jean Harley, Pam John, Gill Miles (Cardiff)	
2009	Jackie Hopkins, Claire Kelly, Emma Moorhouse, Judith Wason (Tridwr)	
2010	Natalie Phillips, Jess Williams, Wendy Price, Betty Morgan (Llandrindod Wells)	
2011	Rhian Jones, Morfydd Rees, Carolyn James, Anwen Butten (Lampeter)	
2012	Mary Jones, Lynda Jones, Elizabeth Anderson, Eirlys Davies (Bridgend Municipal)	
2013	Caroline Taylor, Hazel Wilson, Isabel Jones, Kathy Pearce (Berriew)	
2014	Kayleigh Morris, Jess Sims, Wendy Price, Betty Morgan (Llandrindod Wells)	
2015	Rhian Jones, Melanie Thomas, Carolyn James, Anwen Butten (Lampeter)	
2016	Kayleigh Morris, Jess Sims, Wendy Price, Betty Morgan (Llandrindod Wells)	
2017	Eirlys Davies, Elizabeth Anderson, Lynda Jones, Mary Jones (Bridgend)	
2018	Caroline Taylor, Nerys Lewis, Hazel Wilson, Isabel Jones (Berriew)	
2019	Eileen Williams, Sophie Gittins, Emma Gittins, Kathy Pearce (Berriew)	
	2020, 2021 & 2022 cancelled due to the COVID-19 pandemic	
2023	Sam Boland, Hazel Wilson, Isabel Jones, Caroline Taylor (Berriew)	
2024	June Morgan, Barbara Sheers, Fiona Preece, Jo Weale (Presteigne)	
2025	Eileen Lloyd, Maria Thomas, Anwen Butten, Alis Butten (Lampeter)	
