= Wales at the 1982 Commonwealth Games =

- CG code: WAL
- CGA: Wales at the Commonwealth Games
- Website: teamwales.cymru

in Brisbane, Australia
- Medals Ranked 8th: Gold 4 Silver 4 Bronze 1 Total 9

Commonwealth Games appearances (overview)
- 1930; 1934; 1938; 1950; 1954; 1958; 1962; 1966; 1970; 1974; 1978; 1982; 1986; 1990; 1994; 1998; 2002; 2006; 2010; 2014; 2018; 2022; 2026; 2030

Wales competed at the 1982 Commonwealth Games in Brisbane, Australia, from 30 September to 9 October 1982.

Wales came 8th overall with 4 golds, 4 silvers and 1 bronze medal.

== Medallists ==
=== Gold ===
- Steve Barry (athletics)
- John Burns (weightlifting)
- Kirsty McDermott (athletics)
- Dave Morgan (weightlifting)

=== Silver ===
- Michelle Scutt (athletics)
- John Vivian (shooting)
- Men's pairs (lawn bowls)
- Men's 50m rifle prone pair (shooting)

=== Bronze ===
- Bill Watkins (shooting)

== Team ==
=== Archery ===
Men

Athlete	Events	Club	Medals
Tony Lewis	individual		

Women

Athlete	Events	Club	Medals
Marion Workman	individual		

=== Athletics ===
Men

Athlete	Events	Club	Medals
Steve Barry	30km walk		Gold medal
Dennis Fowles	5000m, 10,000m, marathon		
Roger Hackney	1500m, 5000m, steeplechase		
Steve Jones	5000m, 10,000m, marathon		
Trevor Huw Llewelyn	high jump		
Phillip G. Norgate	800m		
Berwyn Price	110m hurdles		

Women

Athlete	Events	Club	Medals
Diane Fryar	400m hurdles, 4 × 400 m relay		
Venissa Head	discus throw, shot put		
Hilary Jane Hollick	1500m, 3000m		
Kim Lock	1500m, 3000m		
Kirsty McDermott	800m, 4 × 400 m relay		Gold medal
Sarah Judith Owen	400m hurdles, high jump, pentathlon		
Gillian Mary Regan	long jump		
Michelle Scutt	200m, 400m, 4 × 400 m relay		Silver medal
Carmen Veronica Smart	200m, 400m, 4 × 400 m relay		

=== Badminton ===
Athlete	Events	Club	Medals
Mark Richards	singles, doubles	Pontypridd	
Philip Sutton	singles, doubles	Varteg / Enfield	

=== Boxing ===
Athlete	Events	Club	Medals
Jonathan Alsop	60kg lightweight	Cardiff YMCA ABC	
Paul Lewis	71kg light-middleweight	Maindee ABC, Newport	

=== Cycling ===
Athlete	Events	Club	Medals
Peter Hamilton	road TTT, scratch, pursuit		
Russell Harrington	road race, road TTT		
Keith Jones	road race		
John Pritchard	road race, road TTT, pursuit		
Colin Thornton	road race, road TTT		

=== Diving ===
Athlete	Events	Club	Medals
Bob Morgan	springboard, platform		

=== Lawn bowls ===
Men

Athlete	Events	Club	Medals
Lyn Perkins	pairs	Tonypandy BC	Silver medal
Jim Morgan	fours	Barry Athletic BC	
Spencer Wilshire	pairs	Tonypandy BC	Silver medal
Alun Thomas	fours	BSC, Ebbw Vale	
Cliff Williams	fours	Gowerton BC	
Ray Williams	fours	Bedwas BC	

Women

Athlete	Events	Club	Medals
Janet Ackland	triples	Penarth Belle Vue BC	
Gillian Miles	triples	Sophia Gardens BC, Cardiff	
Margaret Pomeroy	triples	Sophia Gardens BC, Cardiff	

=== Shooting ===
Men

Athlete	Events	Club	Medals
David Arnold	air rifle, pair, 50m rifle 3Pos		
Tony Bowden	rapid fire pistol		
Denis Brown	trap, pair		
John Edwards	air rifle, pair		
Colin Harris	50m rifle prone, pair		Silver medal
Phillip Llewellyn	skeet		
Dion O'Leary	fullbore rifle, pair		
Peter Pelopida	trap, pair		
John Vivian	fullbore rifle, pair		Silver medal
Bill Watkins	50m rifle prone, pair		,

=== Swimming ===
Men

Athlete	Events	Club	Medals
Karl Adkins	100, 200m breaststroke, 200 medley, 4x100 free		
Leigh Atkinson	100, 200m breaststroke, 4x100m medley		
Tony Day	400, 1500 free, 400 medley, 4x200m free		
Peter Gwilt	100, 200m butterfly, 4x100m medley, 4x100 free		
Peter Morris	100, 200m butterfly, 400 medley, 4x200m free		
Stuart Roberts	100m butterfly, 100m backstroke 100m free, 4x100m medley, 4x100 free		
Bruce Perry	200 breaststroke, 200, 400, 1500 free, 200 medley, 4x200m free		
Mark Taylor	100, 200 free, 4x100 free, 4x200m free, 4x100m medley		

Women

Athlete	Events	Club	Medals
Claire Tucker	100, 200m breaststroke		

=== Weightlifting ===
Athlete	Events	Medals
Jeffrey Bryce	60kg lightweight	
John Burns	110kg heavyweight	Gold medal
Paul Easton	90kg middle Heavyweight	
Ronald Lee	56kg bantamweight	
Alan Wilson Locking	100kg sub Heavyweight	
Dave Morgan	lightweight 67.5kg	Bronze medal
Robert Shepherd	67.5kg lightweight	
Gary Taylor	100kg sub Heavyweight	
Steven Wilson	110kg heavyweight	
