= Wilf John =

British lawn bowler

Personal information
- Nationality: British (Welsh)
- Born: 25 October 1904 Rhymney, Wales
- Died: October 1983 (aged 78–79) Newport, Wales

Sport
- Sport: Bowls
- Club: Rhymney Royal

Thomas Wilfred "Wilf" John (25 October 1904 – October 1983) was a Welsh lawn bowler who competed at the Commonwealth Games.

== Biography ==
John bowled for the Rhymney Royal Bowls Club and in 1956 won the Welsh National Bowls Championships pairs with Jack Lewis. The 1956 success led to their selection for the British Commonwealth and Empire Games qualification tournament in Cardiff, which they won by extremely fortuitous means. First, the 1957 pairs champions and favourites Jack Griffiths and Len Hill withdrew due to the fact that they had already qualified in the fours and could not represent Wales in a second event at the Games and then were losing 23–10 to the Melyn pair of Morgan and Hinders with just three ends to play when the club's president William Hughes had collapsed and died in the clubhouse, leading to their withdrawal.

He subsequently represented the Welsh team at the 1958 British Empire and Commonwealth Games in Cardiff, Wales, where he competed in the pairs event, and helped Wales finish in ninth place with Jack Lewis.

In 1962 he also reached the final of the national pairs in 1956 with his son Aeron John, losing out to Emrys Jenkins and Fred Thomas of Llanelli.

He represented Wales from 1946 to 1963.
