= Wales at the 1974 British Commonwealth Games =

- CG code: WAL
- CGA: Wales at the Commonwealth Games
- Website: teamwales.cymru

in Christchurch, New Zealand
- Flag bearer: John Hatfield
- Medals Ranked 12th: Gold 1 Silver 5 Bronze 4 Total 10

British Commonwealth Games appearances
- 1930; 1934; 1938; 1950; 1954; 1958; 1962; 1966; 1970; 1974; 1978; 1982; 1986; 1990; 1994; 1998; 2002; 2006; 2010; 2014; 2018; 2022; 2026; 2030

Wales competed at the 1974 British Commonwealth Games in Christchurch, New Zealand, from 24 January to 22 February 1974.

Wales came 12th overall with 1 gold, 5 silver and 4 bronze medals.

== Medallists ==
=== Gold ===
- Pat Beavan (swimming)

=== Silver ===
- John Davies (athletics)
- Errol McKenzie (boxing)
- Ieuan Owen (weightlifting)
- Berwyn Price (athletics)
- Bill Watkins (shooting)

=== Bronze ===
- Phil Lewis (shooting)
- Ruth Martin-Jones (athletics)
- Terry Perdue (weightlifting)
- Robert Wrench (weightlifting)

== Team ==
=== Athletics ===
Men

Athlete	Events	Club	Medals
John Davies	1500m, steeplechase		Silver medal
Michael Delaney	200, 400m, 4x400		
Bernard Hayward	1500, 5000m, steeplechase		
David Lease	pole vault		
Phil Lewis	800m, 4x400		
Wynford Morgan Leyshon	400m hurdles, 4x400		
Colin O'Neill	400m hurdles, 4x400		
Gordon Minty	5000, 10,000m		
Bernard Plain	10,000m, marathon		
Berwyn Price	110m hurdles, 400m hurdles		Silver medal
Malcolm D. Thomas	marathon		

Women

Athlete	Events	Club	Medals
Gloria Dourass	400m, 800m		
Susan James	javelin throw		
Jean M. Lochhead	800m, 1500m		
Ruth Martin-Jones	long jump		Bronze medal

=== Badminton ===
Men

Athlete	Events	Club	Medals
Howard Jennings	singles, mixed	Steinberg BC	

Women

Athlete	Events	Club	Medals
Sue Alfieri	singles, mixed	Gloucestershire	

=== Boxing ===
Athlete	Events	Club	Medals
William Allen	light-middleweight 71kg	Rhyl ABC	
Wayne Bennett	light-welterweight 63.5kg	New Tredegar ABC	
Chris Davies	featherweight 57kg	Llandaff ABC, Cardiff	
Bryn Griffiths	flyweight 51kg	Rhondda ABC	
Errol McKenzie	welterweight 67kg	Llandaff ABC, Cardiff	Silver medal

=== Cycling ===
Athlete	Events	Club	Medals
John Hatfield	sprint, scratch, tandem, team pursuit		
Edwin Demery	road race, team pursuit		
John James	road race		
John Pritchard	time trial, indiv pursuit		
Barrie Smith	road race, indiv & team pursuit		
Phillip Taylor	scratch, time trial, indiv & team pursuit		
Colin Thornton	road race		
John Tudor	scratch, sprint, time trial, tandem		

=== Lawn bowls ===
Men

Athlete	Events	Club	Medals
John Russell Evans	fours	Barry Athletic BC	
Maldwyn Evans	singles	Gelli Park BC	
Gareth Humphreys	fours	Barry Athletic BC	
Dai Richards	fours	Brynhyfryd BC, Llanelli	
Ellis Stanbury	pairs	Llanbradach BC	
Ian Sutherland	fours	Beaufort BC	
Jock Thompson	pairs	Rhiwbina BC	

=== Shooting ===
Men

Athlete	Events	Medals
Ronald Bevan	skeet, trap	
Richard Cross	50m free pistol	
Stanley Gray	fullbore rifle pair	
Colin Harris	50m rifle prone	
Robert S. Hassall	50m free pistol, rapid fire pistol	
Phil Lewis	trap	Bronze medal
Terry O'Dwyer	rapid fire pistol	
John Vivian	fullbore rifle pair	
Roger Rees	skeet	
Bill Watkins	50m rifle prone	Silver medal

=== Swimming ===
Athlete	Events	Club	Medals
Nigel Culverwell	100, 200m backstroke, medley relay		
Vivian Davies	100, 200m breaststroke, 200, 400 medley, medley relay		
Rowland Jones	100, 200 backstroke, 200, 400m medley, relayx2		
Clive Lewis	100m backstroke, 100, 200 free, relayx3		
Sean Maher	100, 200 free, 100, 200m butterfly, relayx3		
Kevan Moran	100, 200m free, relayx2		

Women

Athlete	Events	Club	Medals
Anne Adams	100m breaststroke, 100 butterfly, 200, 400 medley, relayx2		
Pat Beavan	100, 200m breaststroke, 200 medley, medley relay		Gold medal
Elizabeth Davis	100, 200m backstroke		
Sally Hurn	100, 200 free, 100, 200 butterfly, relayx2		
Penelope John	100, 200m butterfly, 200, 400 free, 200, 400 medley, relayx2		
Judith Parry	100, 200m breaststroke, freestyle relay		
Kim Walker	100, 200 free, 100, 200m backstroke, relayx2		

=== Weightlifting ===
Athlete	Events	Club	Medals
Terry Bennett	75kg		
Michael James Brown	+110kg		
John Burns	90kg		
Peter Nitsch	90kg		
Ieuan Owen	67.5kg		Silver medal
Terry Perdue	+110kg		Bronze medal
Chung Kum Weng	60kg		
Meurin Williams	60kg		
Robert Wrench	75kg		Bronze medal
