= Daniel Davies (bowls) =

Welsh bowls player

Personal information
- Nationality: British (Welsh)

Sport
- Club: Crosskeys Welfare BC(outdoors); Merthyr Tydfil IBC (indoors)

Achievements and titles
- Highest world ranking: 15 (August 2026)
Medal record
Representing Wales
Bowls World Cup
Gold medal – first place	2025 Kuala Lumpur	men's pairs
Welsh Nationals
Gold medal – first place	2018	fours
Gold medal – first place	2022	pairs
Gold medal – first place	2025	triples
Gold medal – first place	2025	fours

Daniel Davies Jr. is a Welsh lawn and indoor bowler who has represented Wales at international level. He reached a career high ranking of world number 15 in August 2026.

== Biography ==
Davies Jr. came to prominence after reaching the final of the triples at the 2014 Welsh National Bowls Championships bowling for his club Beaufort. Four years later in 2018, he became a champion of Wales after winning the fours with Daniel Davies Sr., Roger Jones and Chris Klefenz. Also in 2018, Davies was named in the Welsh trials squad for the 2019 international series.

Another fours final appearance for Beaufort ensued in 2019 and he won the national pairs with Chris Klefenz in 2022. Bowling for Merthyr Tydfil indoors, Davies was called up by Wales for indoors for the 2022-2023 national senior squad.

In 2024 Davies joined the Crosskeys Welfare Bowls Club, represented Wales at the Hong Kong International Bowls Classic and won both the triples and fours titles at the 2025 Welsh nationals.

He won the gold medal after reaching the final of the 2025 Bowls World Cup, where he partnered Ross Owen in the pairs event, beating Paul Foster and Jason Banks in the final.
