= Paul Taylor (bowls) =

British Bowls player

Personal information
- Nationality: British (Welsh)
- Born: 19 June 1988 (age 38) Bridgend, Wales
- Occupation: Administrator

Sport
- Sport: Lawn bowls
- Club: Ely Valley (Outdoor); Rhondda (Indoor)
Medal record
Representing Wales
Men's lawn bowls
Commonwealth Games
Bronze medal – third place	2014 Glasgow	Men's triples
Atlantic Bowls Championships
Silver medal – second place	2015 Paphos, Cyprus	Men's triples
Bronze medal – third place	2015 Paphos, Cyprus	Men's fours
British Isles Championships
Gold medal – first place	2017	triples
Welsh Nationals
Gold medal – first place	2009	fours
Gold medal – first place	2013	triples
Gold medal – first place	2016	triples

Paul Taylor (born 19 June 1988) is a Welsh international lawn bowler.

== Bowls career ==
Taylor competed for Wales in the men's triples at the 2014 Commonwealth Games where he won a bronze medal with Jonathan Tomlinson and Marc Wyatt. In 2015 he won the triples silver medal and fours bronze medal at the Atlantic Bowls Championships.

Taylor has won five Welsh National Bowls Championships outdoor titles (2005 under 18 singles, 2009 fours, 2011 under 25 singles, 2013 & 2016 triples) and finished runner four times (2006 Under 18 Singles, 2010 pairs, 2012 singles and 2021 triples. In addition he has won the 2012 Tiger Fours Invitational and the under 25 Singles and triples at the British Isles Championships. Furthermore, he won the Carruthers Shield Welsh Club Championship with Ely Valley in 2016.

He bowls for Ely Valley after previously winning national titles with Bridgend BC and Pontycymmer BC. In 2021, he finished runner-up in the men's triples at the 2021 Welsh National Bowls Championships.
