= Shirley King =

Welsh international lawn bowler

Personal information
- Nationality: British (Welsh)

Sport
- Sport: Lawn and indoor bowls
- Club: Llandrindod Wells BC
Medal record
Representing Wales
British Isles Championships
Gold medal – first place	1991, 2015	triples
Welsh Nationals
Gold medal – first place	1990, 1991, 2001, 2014, 2015	triples

Shirley King is a former international lawn bowler from Wales who competed at the Commonwealth Games.

== Biography ==
King was a member of the Llandrindod Wells Bowls Club and represented Wales at international level.

King represented the Welsh team at the 2006 Commonwealth Games in Melbourne, Australia, where she competed in the pairs event, with Gill Miles.

She was five-times triples champion of Wales at the Welsh National Bowls Championships in 1990, 1991, 2001, 2014 and 2015, and subsequently qualified to represent Wales at the British Isles Bowls Championships, winning the triples title in 1991 and 2015.

In August 2025, she made her 250th appearance for mid Wales.
