= Mark Anstey =

Welsh lawn and indoor bowler

Personal information
- Nationality: Welsh

Sport
- Club: Beaufort BC, Abergavenny BC (outdoor); Merthyr Tydfil BC (indoor)
Medal record
Representing Wales
Lawn bowls
Commonwealth Games
Bronze medal – third place	1998 Kuala Lumpur	fours

Mark Anstey is a former Welsh international lawn and indoor bowler.

He won a bronze medal in the fours with Dai Wilkins, Ian Slade and Neil Rees at the 1998 Commonwealth Games in Kuala Lumpur.

He is a two times Welsh National Champion, winning the fours in 1988 and 1989, when bowling for the Abergavenny Bowls Club. He is also a former Welsh indoor national champion.
