= Ray Hill (bowls) =

Welsh international lawn bowler

Personal information
- Nationality: British (Welsh)
- Born: c.1930

Sport
- Sport: Lawn and indoor bowls
- Club: Aberavon BC

Ray Hill (born c.1930) is a former international lawn bowler from Wales who competed at the Commonwealth Games.

== Biography ==
Hill took up bowls in 1956 following in his father's footsteps (Len Hill), and won the fours bowling with him for the Port Talbot Municipal quartet at the 1962 Welsh National Bowls Championships. Howwver, Ray suffered a heart attack which affected his career.

Hill later became a member of the Aberavon Bowls Club and was a head teacher by profession. Hill was again the champion of Wales at the 1982 Welsh National Bowls Championships, winning the triples.

Hill represented the Welsh team at the 1986 Commonwealth Games in Edinburgh, Scotland, where he competed in the singles event finishing in seventh place.
