= Jim Hoskins =

Welsh international lawn bowler

Personal information
- Nationality: British (Welsh)

Sport
- Sport: Lawn and indoor bowls
- Club: Bridgend BC
Medal record
Representing Wales
Welsh Nationals
Gold medal – first place	1998	triples

Jim Hoskins is a former international lawn bowler from Wales who competed at the Commonwealth Games.

== Biography ==
Hoskins was a member of the Bridgend Bowls Club and represented and captained Wales at international level.

Hoskins represented the Welsh team at the 1994 Commonwealth Games in Victoria, Canada, where he competed in the fours event, with Wyn Matthews, Philip Rowlands and Dai Wilkins.

He was the triples champion of Wales at the 1998 Welsh National Bowls Championships and subsequently qualified to represent Wales at the British Isles Bowls Championships.
