= Richard Bowen (bowls) =

Welsh bowls player (born 1957)

Personal information
- Nationality: Wales
- Born: 5 January 1957 (age 69) Briton Ferry
- Education: Bridgend Boys Grammar School & Brynteg Comprehensive school

Sport
- Club: Shipdham Bowling Club
Medal record
Representing Wales
Lawn bowls
Commonwealth Games
Bronze medal – third place	2002 Manchester	fours

Richard Bowen (born 5 January 1957) is a Welsh international lawn bowler.

== Bowls career ==
Bowen won a bronze medal in the fours with Jason Greenslade, Ian Slade and Dai Wilkins at the 2002 Commonwealth Games in Manchester.

Bowen now bowls for Shipdham Bowling Club and has previously bowled for Porthcawl Bowling Club, Cardigan Bowling Club, Barry Athletic Bowling Club and also Dinas Powys Bowling Club.

Bowen won the 1994 fours title at the Welsh National Bowls Championships when bowling for Cardigan BC and the National Senior Singles in 2018 when bowling for Barry Athletic Bowling Club. He has also won the Welsh Triples in 1988 bowling with Porthcawl Bowling Club. Richard Bowen won his last National Title whilst bowling with Dinas Powys Bowling Club, winning the Senior Fours title in 2022.

He is previously a director of BowlsWales, where he had responsibility for hi-performance and HR.
