= Leighton Jenkins (bowls) =

Welsh lawn bowler

Personal information
- Nationality: British (Welsh)
- Born: 4 December 1928 Penclawdd, Wales
- Died: 8 March 2013 Glamorgan, Wales

Sport
- Sport: Lawn bowls
- Club: Penclawdd BC
Medal record
Representing Wales
National Championships
Gold medal – first place	1967	fours
Gold medal – first place	1968	pairs

Daniel "Leighton" Jenkins (4 December 1928 – 8 March 2013) was an international lawn bowler from Wales who competed at the Commonwealth Games.

== Biography ==
Jenkins broke his arm playing rugby, which forced him to take up bowls in 1947. He was a member of the Penclawdd Bowls Club and was a two-times national champion, winning the pairs at the Welsh National Bowls Championships in 1968 with Gwyn Howells and the fours in 1967. By winning the national pairs they represented Wales at the 1968 British Isles Bowls Championships.

Jenkins represented the Welsh team, at the 1970 British Commonwealth Games in Edinburgh, Scotland. He participated in the pairs competition partnering Leighton Jenkins.

By profession he was the head of music at a comprehensive school and partnered Maldwyn Evans in the pairs at the 1972 World Outdoor Bowls Championship.
