= David Kingdon =

Welsh lawn bowler

Personal information
- Nationality: British (Welsh)
- Born: April 1969 Wales

Sport
- Club: Tenby BC (outdoor); Heatherton IBC (indoor)
Medal record
Representing Wales
British Isles Championships
Gold medal – first place	2014	singles
Welsh Nationals
Gold medal – first place	2013	singles
Gold medal – first place	2016	singles
Hong Kong International Classic
Silver medal – second place	2016	singles

David Wyn Kingdon (born April 1969) is a Welsh international lawn bowler and former British champion.

== Biography ==
Kingdon is twice winner of the Welsh National Bowls Championships singles in 2013 and 2016. After the 2013 victory he subsequently won the singles at the British Isles Bowls Championships in 2014.

His father Brian Kingdon won the 1993 and 1997 triples national championship.

In 2023, he was denied the chance to go equal second on the all-time Welsh singles list by Ross Owen, who defeated him in the Welsh nationals final.
