= Wyn Matthews =

Welsh international lawn bowler

Personal information
- Nationality: British (Welsh)
- Born: 7 February 1969 (age 57) Swansea, Wales

Sport
- Sport: Lawn and indoor bowls
- Club: Graig Merthyr BC; Llanelli IBC
Medal record
Representing Wales
British Isles Championships
Gold medal – first place	1991	triples
Welsh Nationals
Gold medal – first place	1990, 2023	triples
Gold medal – first place	2014	fours

David "Wyn" Matthews (born 7 February 1969) is a former international lawn bowler from Wales who competed at the Commonwealth Games.

== Biography ==
Matthews was a member of the Graig Merthyr Bowls Club, making his debut in 1984 at the age of 15 and represented Carmarthenshire aged 17.

Outdoors, he represented Wales at international level from 1991 to 1999 and indoors, Matthews played for Llanelli IBC and also represented Wales at international level.

Matthews represented the Welsh team at the 1994 Commonwealth Games in Victoria, Canada, where he competed in the fours event, with Jim Hoskins, Phil Rowlands and Dai Wilkins.

He was a three-times champion of Wales at the Welsh National Bowls Championships, winning the triples in 1990 ans 2023 and the fours in 2014. He subsequently qualified to represent Wales at the British Isles Bowls Championships, winning the triples title in 1991.
