= Neil Rees (bowls) =

Welsh international lawn and indoor bowler

Personal information
- Full name: Neil Peter Rees
- Nationality: Welsh
- Born: 28 April 1978 (age 48)

Sport
- Sport: Bowls
- Club: Parc-y-Dre BC (outdoor)
Medal record
Lawn bowls
Representing Wales
Commonwealth Games
Bronze medal – third place	1998 Kuala Lumpur	Fours
Atlantic Bowls Championships
Gold medal – first place	2007 Ayr	triples
Bronze medal – third place	2007 Ayr	fours

Neil Peter Rees (born 28 April 1978) is a former Welsh international lawn and indoor bowler.

== Bowling career ==
He won a bronze medal in the fours with Dai Wilkins, Ian Slade and Mark Anstey at the 1998 Commonwealth Games in Kuala Lumpur.

He also participated in the 2006 Commonwealth Games in the pairs competition partnering with Jason Greenslade.

He has also won the triples gold medal and fours bronze medal at the Atlantic Bowls Championships and the 1997 and 2012 triples title at the Welsh National Bowls Championships when bowling for Parc-y-Dre BC.
