= Stan Weaver =

British lawn bowler

Personal information
- Nationality: British (Welsh)
- Born: January 12, 1890 Swansea, Wales
- Died: 24 March 1973 (aged 83) Radnorshire

Sport
- Sport: Lawn bowls
- Club: Swansea BC; Llandrindod Wells BC
Medal record
Men's Lawn bowls
Representing Wales
British Empire Games
Bronze medal – third place	1934 London	Pairs

Stanley James Weaver (1890-1973), was a Welsh lawn bowls international who competed in the 1934 British Empire Games.

== Bowls career ==
Weaver represented England at the 1934 British Empire Games and won the bronze medal in the pairs event with Thomas Davies.

He bowled for the Swansea and Llandrindod Wells Bowls Clubs. He was a Welsh representative from 1927-1935 and was Welsh national champion on five occasions winning the singles in 1932, the pairs in 1934 and the rinks in 1925, 1927 & 1933.

== Personal life ==
He was a building contractor by trade and married Elizabeth Charles in 1923.
