= Ian Sutherland (bowls) =

Welsh international lawn bowls player

Personal information
- Nationality: British (Welsh)
- Born: 15 November 1935 Bedwellty, Wales
- Died: 1999 Blaenau Gwent, Wales

Sport
- Sport: Lawn bowls
- Club: Ebbw Vale BC / Beaufort BC
Medal record
Representing Wales
Commonwealth Games
Bronze medal – third place	1978 Edmonton	men's fours

Ian Charles Sutherland (15 November 1935 – 1999) was a Welsh international lawn bowls player.

== Bowls career ==
Sutherland represented the Welsh team at the 1974 British Commonwealth Games in Christchurch, New Zealand, where he competed in the fours event, with Gareth Humphreys, John Russell Evans and Dai Richards and just missed the medal rostrum after finishing in fourth place.

Four years later, he won a bronze medal in the men's fours at the 1978 Commonwealth Games in Edmonton with Ellis Stanbury, Gwyn Evans, and John Thomson.

He won a national pairs title in 1971 at the Welsh National Bowls Championships when he was with the Ebbw Vale club. He was bowling for Beaufort BC at the time of the 1974 Games.
