= Gareth Humphreys =

Welsh lawn bowler (1935–2024)

Personal information
- Nationality: British (Welsh)
- Born: 15 November 1935 Tylorstown, Rhondda, Wales
- Died: 28 October 2024 (aged 88) Barry, Vale of Glamorgan, Wales

Sport
- Sport: Lawn bowls
- Club: Penrhys Park, followed by Barry Athletic BC
Medal record
Representing Wales
World Outdoor Championships
Bronze medal – third place	1972 Worthing	triples
British Isles Championships
Gold medal – first place	1964	fours

Gareth Humphreys, MBE (15 November 1935 – 28 October 2024) was a Welsh international lawn bowler.

== Bowls career ==
Humphreys won a bronze medal in the triples at the 1972 World Outdoor Bowls Championship in Worthing. He represented the Welsh team at the 1974 British Commonwealth Games in Christchurch, New Zealand, where he competed in the fours event, with Ian Sutherland, John Russell Evans and Dai Richards and just missed the medal rostrum after finishing in fourth place.

In addition he won 15 national titles and 16 county titles and was capped 90 times by Wales from 1963 until 1978.

He played for Barry Athletic Bowls Club from 1959 and was a member of Barry Athletic BC for 65 years and represented Wales indoors from 1964 to 1984.

He was a four times Welsh National Champion, winning the triples in 1974 and the fours in 1963, 1969 and 1976, when bowling for the Barry Athletic Bowls Club. He was the British Isles Bowls Championships fours winner in 1964.

Humphreys was the President of the Welsh Indoor Bowls Association in 1990-91.

== Personal life and death ==
Humphreys was a third generation bowler following his grandfather and father (who was a Welsh international 1957-58) who introduced him into bowls during June 1945.

Humphreys died on the 28 October 2024, at the age of 88.

== Honours ==
Humphreys received an MBE in the 2009 Birthday Honours for his voluntary services to lawn bowls.
