= Phil Rowlands =

Welsh international lawn bowler

Personal information
- Nationality: British (Welsh)

Sport
- Sport: Lawn and indoor bowls
- Club: Penhill BC; Cardiff IBC

Philip "Phil" Rowlands is a former international lawn bowler from Wales who competed at the Commonwealth Games.

== Biography ==
Rowlands was born into a bowling family, his father Keith and grandfather Tom both being Welsh internationals. Phil was a member of the Penhill Bowls Club.

Rowlands represented the Welsh team at the 1994 Commonwealth Games in Victoria, Canada, where he competed in the fours event, with Wyn Matthews, Jim Hoskins and Dai Wilkins.

Rowlands played for Cardiff indoors and in 2011 he won his second Welsh national indoor championship singles, a title he had previously won 21 years before in 1990.

Rowlands later became the secretary of the Ynyscynon Bowls Club.
