= Claude Stephens =

Welsh lawn bowler

Personal information
- Nationality: British (Welsh)
- Born: 13 May 1905 Abergavenny, Wales
- Died: 16 January 1988 (aged 82) Pontypool, Wales

Sport
- Sport: Lawn bowls
- Club: Abergavenny BC
Medal record
Representing Wales
British Isles Championships
Gold medal – first place	1961	fours
National Championships
Gold medal – first place	1953	pairs
Gold medal – first place	1960	fours

Claude Leopold Vernon Stephens (13 May 1905 – 16 January 1988), was a Welsh international lawn bowler who competed at the British Empire and Commonwealth Games (now Commonwealth Games).

== Biography ==
Stephens lived in Hatherleigh Road and was a member of the Abergavenny Bowling Club. After the war he became a newsagent.

In 1953, partnering Albert Evans, the pair won the Welsh National Bowls Championships title and Stephens subsequently made his Welsh international debut in 1954.

In 1960 the Abergavenny quartet of Stephens, Albert Evans, Tom Griffiths and Lynn Probert, won the national fours title at the Welsh Championships. Subsequently, the four then won British Isles Bowls Championships in 1961.

Stephens represented the 1962 Welsh team at the 1962 British Empire and Commonwealth Games in Perth, Australia in the fours/rinks event, with Evans, Griffiths and Probert, where they finished in fifth place.
