= Gwyn Howells (bowls) =

Welsh lawn bowler

Personal information
- Nationality: British (Welsh)
- Born: c.1910 Wales

Sport
- Sport: Lawn bowls
- Club: Penclawdd BC
Medal record
Representing Wales
National Championships
Gold medal – first place	1967	fours
Gold medal – first place	1968	pairs

Gwyn Howells (1910 – date of death unknown) was an international lawn bowler from Wales who competed at the Commonwealth Games.

== Biography ==
Howells was a member of the Penclawdd Bowls Club and was a two-times national champion, winning the pairs at the Welsh National Bowls Championships in 1968 with Leighton Jenkins and the fours in 1967. By winning the national pairs they represented Wales at the 1968 British Isles Bowls Championships.

At the age of 60, Howells represented the Welsh team, at the 1970 British Commonwealth Games in Edinburgh, Scotland. He participated in the pairs competition partnering Leighton Jenkins.
