= Wales at the 1950 British Empire Games =

- CGF code: WAL
- CGA: Wales at the Commonwealth Games
- Website: teamwales.cymru

in Auckland, New Zealand
- Medals Ranked 10th: Gold 0 Silver 1 Bronze 0 Total 1

British Empire Games appearances
- 1930; 1934; 1938; 1950; 1954; 1958; 1962; 1966; 1970; 1974; 1978; 1982; 1986; 1990; 1994; 1998; 2002; 2006; 2010; 2014; 2018; 2022; 2026; 2030

Flag of Wales until 1953

Wales at the 1950 British Empire Games (abbreviated WAL) was the fourth time that the nation had participated at the Games following the appearances in 1930, 1934 and 1938.

The Games were held in Auckland, New Zealand, from 4 to 11 February 1950, following a twelve-year break because of World War II. Wales came equal 10th overall in the medal table with one silver medal. The team consisted of just three athletes.

== Medals ==
=== Gold ===
None

=== Silver ===
- John Brockway, Swimming

=== Bronze ===
None

== Team ==
=== Athletics ===
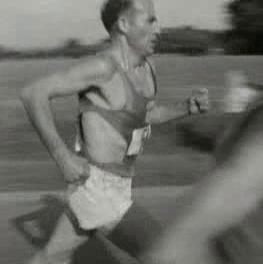
Tom Richards competed in the marathon

Athlete	Events	Notes	Medals
Tom Richards	marathon	South London Harriers	

=== Cycling ===
Athlete	Events	Notes	Medals
Malcolm Campbell	Road Race, 10 mile scratch, 4000m pursuit	Byways RCC	

=== Swimming ===
Athlete	Events	Notes	Medals
John Brockway	110y backstroke	Newport Swimming Club	Silver medal

== See also ==
- Wales at the Commonwealth Games
