= Percy Holloway =

Welsh lawn bowler

Personal information
- Nationality: British (Welsh)
- Born: 21 August 1900 Barry, Vale of Glamorgan, Wales
- Died: 3 September 1980 (aged 80) Llantwit Major, Wales

Sport
- Sport: Lawn bowls
- Club: Barry Athletic BC; Roath Park; Bargoed Welfare BC
Medal record
National Championships
| Gold medal – first place | 1923 | singles |
| Gold medal – first place | 1934 | singles |

Edward Percy Holloway (21 August 1900 – 3 September 1980) was a Welsh lawn bowls international who competed at the British Empire Games (now Commonwealth Games).

== Biography ==
Holloway bowled for Barry Athletic Bowls Club when winning the 1923 Welsh national singles title. After a spell with Roath Park, he joined the Bargoed Welfare Bowls Club and was a postmaster by profession in Deri, Caerphilly. By 1929 he was captain of the Bargoed club.

He represented Glamorgan at county level, won the 1934 Welsh national singles title and represented Wales at international level. By virtue of winning the 1934 national singles, he was selected for the 1934 British Empire Games in London the following month.

He subsequently represented the 1934 Welsh Empire team in the singles event.
