= Mike Prosser =

Personal information
- Nationality: Welsh
- Born: 7 February 1966 (age 60) Tonyrefail, Wales

Sport
- Sport: Lawn bowls
- Club: Dinas Powis BC
Medal record
Representing Wales
Atlantic Bowls Championships
Gold medal – first place	2007 Ayr	triples

Michael Prosser (born 1966) is a Welsh international lawn bowler.

== Bowls career ==
In 2007 he won the triples gold medal at the Atlantic Bowls Championships

He is a Welsh champion winning the 2000 pairs at the Welsh National Bowls Championships and was Welsh Indoor Singles Champion in 2001.

== Personal life ==
He is a HM Revenue and Customs operations manager by trade.
