= Tom Griffiths (bowls) =

Welsh lawn bowler

Personal information
- Nationality: British (Welsh)
- Born: Wales

Sport
- Sport: Lawn bowls
- Club: Abergavenny BC
Medal record
Representing Wales
British Isles Championships
Gold medal – first place	1961	fours
National Championships
Gold medal – first place	1960	fours

Tom Griffiths was a Welsh international lawn bowler who competed at the British Empire and Commonwealth Games (now Commonwealth Games).

== Biography ==
Griffiths was a member of the Abergavenny Bowling Club.

In 1960 the Abergavenny quartet of Griffiths, Albert Evans, Lynn Probert and Claude Stephens won the national fours title at the Welsh Championships. Subsequently, the four then won British Isles Bowls Championships in 1961.

Griffiths represented the 1962 Welsh team at the 1962 British Empire and Commonwealth Games in Perth, Australia in the pairs event and the fours/rinks event, with Albert Evans, Lynn Probert and Claude Stephens, where the team finished in fifth place.
