= Ian Slade =

Welsh lawn bowler

Personal information
- Nationality: British (Welsh)
- Born: 18 April 1968 (age 58)

Sport
- Club: Pontymister BC, Crosskeys BC (outdoor); Islwyn BC (indoor)
Medal record
Representing Wales
Lawn bowls
Commonwealth Games
Bronze medal – third place	1998 Kuala Lumpur	fours
Bronze medal – third place	2002 Manchester	fours

Ian Slade (born 18 April 1968) is a Welsh international lawn and indoor bowler.

He won a bronze medal in the fours with Dai Wilkins, Mark Anstey and Neil Rees at the 1998 Commonwealth Games in Kuala Lumpur.

Four years later he repeated the feat by winning another bronze in the fours with Richard Bowen, Jason Greenslade and Dai Wilkins at the 2002 Commonwealth Games in Manchester.
