= Ben Thomas (bowls) =

Personal information
- Nationality: Welsh

Sport
- Sport: Lawn bowls
- Club: Pontrhydyfen BC (outdoors)
Medal record
Representing Wales
Atlantic Bowls Championships
Bronze medal – third place	2019 Cardiff	fours
British Isles Championships
Gold medal – first place	2014	fours

Ben Thomas is a Welsh international lawn bowler.

== Bowls career ==
Thomas is a four times National champion, winning the pairs in 2011, the fours in 2012 and 2013 and the singles in 2019 at the Welsh National Bowls Championships. He subsequently won a British title in 2014 after winning the fours at the British Isles Bowls Championships.

In 2019 he won the fours bronze medal at the Atlantic Bowls Championships
