= Andrew Fleming (bowls) =

Personal information
- Nationality: Welsh
- Born: 1971 (age 54–55)

Sport
- Club: Machynlleth BC
Medal record
Representing Wales
Atlantic Bowls Championships
Bronze medal – third place	2011 Paphos	fours

Andrew Fleming (born 1971) is a Welsh international lawn bowler.

== Bowls career ==
Fleming was selected to represent Wales in the 2010 Commonwealth Games in Delhi, where he competed in the triples event.

He won the fours bronze medal at the 2011 Atlantic Bowls Championships in Cyprus.

He is also a two times Welsh national champion after winning two titles at the Welsh National Bowls Championships (2006 pairs and 2008 fours).
