= Bernie Williams (bowls) =

British lawn bowler

Personal information
- Nationality: British (Welsh)
- Born: Wales

Sport
- Sport: Bowls
- Club: Pontymister Welfare BC

A. Bernie Williams is a former Welsh lawn bowler who competed at the Commonwealth Games.

== Biography ==
Williams bowled for the Pontymister Welfare Bowls Club and in 1957 won the Welsh National Bowls Championships singles title. The 1957 success led to his selection for the British Commonwealth and Empire Games qualification tournament in Cardiff, which he subsequently won.

He then represented the Welsh team at the 1958 British Empire and Commonwealth Games in Cardiff, Wales, where he competed in the singles event, and finished in ninth place, despite suffering from ill-health.
