= Robert Horgan =

Personal information
- Nationality: Welsh

Sport
- Sport: Lawn bowls
- Club: Barry Athletic BC
Medal record
Representing Wales
Atlantic Bowls Championships
Gold medal – first place	2007 Ayr	pairs
Bronze medal – third place	2007 Ayr	fours
British Isles Championships
Gold medal – first place	2006	pairs

Robert Horgan is a Welsh international lawn bowler.

== Bowls career ==
In 2007 Horgan won the pairs gold medal and fours bronze medal at the Atlantic Bowls Championships.

He is a three times Welsh champion winning the 2003 & 2005 pairs and 2011 triples at the Welsh National Bowls Championships and became a British champion winning the 2006 pairs at the British Isles Bowls Championships.
