= Steve Harris (bowls) =

Welsh bowls player

Personal information
- Nationality: British (Welsh)
- Born: 15 November 1975 (age 50) Consett, County Durham

Sport
- Sport: Bowls
- Club: RTB Ebbw Vale B.C (outdoors); Blaenau Gwent (indoors)
Medal record
Representing Wales
Atlantic Bowls Championships
Silver medal – second place	2015 Paphos	triples
Bronze medal – third place	2015 Paphos	fours
Bronze medal – third place	2019 Cardiff	fours

Stephen 'Steve' Harris (born 1975) is a Welsh international lawn and indoor bowler.

== Bowls career ==
Harris bowls for RTB Ebbw Vale B.C (outdoors) and Blaenau Gwent (indoors) and was selected for the Welsh team for the 2016 World Outdoor Bowls Championship in Avonhead, Christchurch, New Zealand and the 2018 Commonwealth Games on the Gold Coast in Queensland, Australia.

He is a triples National Champion, bowling for the RTB Ebbw Vale and three times a runner-up in the singles.

In 2015 he won the triples silver medal and fours bronze medal at the Atlantic Bowls Championships. In 2019 he won the fours bronze medal at the Atlantic Bowls Championships and in 2020 he was selected for the 2020 World Outdoor Bowls Championship in Australia.
