= Dai Richards (bowls) =

Welsh international lawn bowler

Personal information
- Nationality: British (Welsh)
- Born: c.1926 Llanelli, Wales

Sport
- Sport: Lawn bowls
- Club: Brynhyfryd BC (Llanelli, Carms)
Medal record
Representing Wales
British Isles Championships
Gold medal – first place	1973	fours
Welsh Nationals
Gold medal – first place	1971	fours
Gold medal – first place	1972	fours
Gold medal – first place	1975	triples

David "Dai" Richards (born c.1926), is a former international lawn bowler from Wales, who captained his nation and competed at the Commonwealth Games.

== Biography ==
Richards was a member of the Brynhyfryd Bowls Club in Llanelli (Carms) and made his Welsh international debut in 1972.

He won the Welsh National Bowls Championships in the fours in 1971 and 1972 and the triples in 1975.

Richards represented the Welsh team at the 1974 British Commonwealth Games in Christchurch, New Zealand, where he competed in the fours event, with Ian Sutherland, Gareth Humphreys and John Russell Evans, just missing the medal rostrum after finishing in fourth place.

After the Welsh national title wins he subsequently qualified to represent Wales at the British Isles Bowls Championships, where they won the fours title in 1973. He also skipped the fours at the 1976 British Isles Championships after their national 1975 success.

Richards, a steelworker by profession, also represented Wales at the 1976 World Outdoor Bowls Championship in South Africa.
