= Ron Thomas (bowls) =

Ron Thomas M.B.E
Personal information
- Nationality: Welsh
- Born: 29 October 1928
- Died: Unknown

Sport
- Club: Barry Athletic BC
Medal record
Representing Wales
World Indoor Bowls Championships
Silver medal – second place	1981 Coatbridge	singles
British Isles Championships
Gold medal – first place	1964	fours

John Ronald Thomas known as Ron Thomas M.B.E., was a Welsh international lawn and indoor bowler.

== Bowls career ==
Thomas made his debut for Wales indoors in 1955 and outdoors in 1960.

He finished runner-up to David Bryant in the 1981 World Indoor Bowls Championship in Coatbridge.

He is twice a Welsh National Champion, winning the fours in 1963 & 1969, when bowling for the Barry Athletic Bowls Club. He also won the British Isles Bowls Championships fours title in 1964.

During the 1984/85 season he was the President of the Welsh Indoor Bowling Association. and received the MBE in the 1994 Birthday Honours as President of the Welsh Association of Visually Handicapped Bowlers for services to Bowling and to People with Disabilities.
