= Caroline Taylor (bowls) =

Welsh lawn bowler (born 1973)

Personal information
- Nationality: British (Welsh)
- Born: 20 August 1973 (age 52) Newtown, Powys, Wales

Sport
- Club: Berriew BC

Achievements and titles
- Highest world ranking: 35 (February 2026)
Medal record
Representing Wales
World Outdoor Championships
Silver medal – second place	2004 Leamington Spa	pairs
Bronze medal – third place	2004 Leamington Spa	fours
Bronze medal – third place	2004 Leamington Spa	team
Bronze medal – third place	2012 Adelaide	triples
European Championships
Bronze medal – third place	2011 Portugal	pairs
Gold medal – first place	2011 Portugal	mixed
Gold medal – first place	2011 Portugal	team
Gold medal – first place	2024 Ayr	triples
Welsh Nationals
Gold medal – first place	2001, 2003, 2011	singles
Gold medal – first place	2002, 2006, 2013, 2018, 2023	fours
Gold medal – first place	2023	triples

Caroline Taylor (born 20 August 1973 in Newtown, Powys) is a Welsh international lawn and indoor bowler. She reached a career high ranking of world number 35 in February 2026.

== Bowls career ==
In 2011, she won three medals including two golds at the European Bowls Championships in Portugal. She won a bronze medal in the triples at the 2012 World Outdoor Bowls Championship in Adelaide.

She was selected as part of the Welsh team for the 2018 Commonwealth Games on the Gold Coast in Queensland

In 2020, she was selected for the 2020 World Outdoor Bowls Championship in Australia but the event was cancelled due to the COVID-19 pandemic. In 2022, she competed in the women's pairs and the Women's fours at the 2022 Commonwealth Games.

Despite winning the triples and fours titles at the 2023 Welsh National Bowls Championships she missed out on selection for the 2023 World Outdoor Bowls Championship. Taylor was in the triples team with Sara Marie Nicholls and Jodie McCarthy that won the gold medal at the 2024 European Bowls Championships.

In 2025, Taylor captured her 10th national title at the Welsh National Bowls Championships in the pairs with Isabel Jones.
