= Carol Difford =

Welsh international lawn bowler

Personal information
- Nationality: British (Welsh)
- Born: c. 1952

Sport
- Sport: Lawn and indoor bowls
- Club: Gilfach Bargoed BC
Medal record
Representing Wales
Welsh Nationals
Gold medal – first place	2004	triples
Gold medal – first place	2009	singles
Gold medal – first place	2013	pairs

Carol Difford (born c. 1952) is an international lawn bowler from Wales who competed at the Commonwealth Games.

== Biography ==
Difford was a member of the Gilfach Bargoed Bowls Club and represented Wales at international level.

Difford represented the Welsh team at the 2010 Commonwealth Games in Delhi, India, where she competed in the singles event.

She is a three-times champion of Wales at the Welsh National Bowls Championships, in the singles in 2009, pairs in 2013 and triples in 2004.
