= Mark Harding (bowls) =

Personal information
- Nationality: British (Welsh)
- Born: 5 June 1971 (age 55) Cardiff, Wales

Sport
- Club: Ely Valley BC; Cardiff IBC
Medal record
Representing Wales
Atlantic Bowls Championships
| Bronze medal – third place | 2011 Paphos | fours |
Welsh Nationals
| Gold medal – first place | 2022 | triples |

Mark Harding (born 1971) is a Welsh international lawn and indoor bowler.

== Bowls career ==
=== Outdoors ===
Harding won the fours bronze medal at the 2011 Atlantic Bowls Championships.

He was selected to represent Wales in the 2014 Commonwealth Games in Glasgow, where he competed in the pairs and the fours events, reaching the quarter-finals of both. In 2021, he finished runner-up in the men's triples at the 2021 Welsh National Bowls Championships.

In 2022, Harding won his first national title after winning the triples with Cory Bayliss and Hugh Morris, bowling for the Ely Valley club.

=== Indoors ===
He has also won two national Welsh indoor titles.
