= Thomas Davies (bowls) =

Welsh lawn bowler

Personal information
- Nationality: British (Welsh)

Sport
- Sport: Lawn bowls
- Club: Swansea BC
Medal record
Men's Lawn bowls
Representing Wales
British Empire Games
Bronze medal – third place	1934 London	Pairs

Thomas R. Davies was a Welsh lawn bowls international who competed in the 1934 British Empire Games.

== Biography ==
Davies bowled for the Swansea Bowls Club and was a Welsh international from 1926 to 1936.

He won three Welsh national titles in 1927 and 1933 (rinks/fours) and 1934 (pairs). By virtue of winning the 1934 national pairs, he was selected for the 1934 British Empire Games in London the following month.

He subsequently represented the 1934 Welsh Empire team in the pairs event, with Stan Weaver and won the bronze medal.
