= Albert Evans (bowls) =

Welsh lawn bowler

Personal information
- Nationality: British (Welsh)
- Born: 1 June 1902 Glascote, England
- Died: 11 May 1977 (aged 74) Abergavenny, Wales

Sport
- Sport: Lawn bowls
- Club: Bailey Park BC; Abergavenny BC
Medal record
Representing Wales
British Isles Championships
Gold medal – first place	1961	fours
National Championships
Gold medal – first place	1945	pairs
Gold medal – first place	1951	singles
Gold medal – first place	1953	pairs
Gold medal – first place	1960	fours
Gold medal – first place	1961	singles

Albert Edward Evans (11 June 1902 – 11 May 1977), was a Welsh international lawn bowler who competed at the British Empire and Commonwealth Games (now Commonwealth Games).

== Biography ==
Evans lived in Westgarth, Rholben Road and by profession was described as a master window cleaner. He was a member of the Bailey Park Bowling Club and then the Abergavenny Bowling Club.

In 1945, partnering W. H. Evans for the Bailey Park Bowling Club, the pair won the Welsh National Bowls Championships title and Evans subsequently made his Welsh international debut in 1950. He then won the singles championship of Wales in 1951 and the pairs championship with Claude Stephens in 1953.

In 1960 the Abergavenny quartet of Evans, Stephens, Tom Griffiths and Lynn Probert won the national fours title at the Welsh Championships and Evans won his fifth national title in 1961, winning the singles again. Subsequently, the four then won British Isles Bowls Championships in 1961.

Evans represented the 1962 Welsh team at the 1962 British Empire and Commonwealth Games in Perth, Australia in the singles event and the fours/rinks event, with Tom Griffiths, Lynn Probert and Claude Stephens, finishing fifth.
