= Kevin James (bowls) =

Personal information
- Nationality: British (Welsh)
- Born: 23 August 1983 (age 42) Wales

Sport
- Club: Cardigan BC
Medal record
Representing Wales
Atlantic Bowls Championships
Bronze medal – third place	2015 Paphos	fours
British Isles Championships
Gold medal – first place	2007	singles
Welsh Nationals
Gold medal – first place	2006	singles
Gold medal – first place	2013	pairs
Gold medal – first place	2018	singles
Gold medal – first place	2021	singles

Kevin James (born 23 August 1983) is a Welsh international lawn bowler and former British champion.

== Bowls career ==
James is a four times National champion, after winning the Welsh National Bowls Championships singles in 2006, 2018 and 2021 and the pairs in 2013. The 2021 victory brought him level (in 2nd place) with Robert Weale in winning three singles titles, only one behind Teddy Jones.

After the 2006 victory he subsequently won the singles at the British Isles Bowls Championships in 2007.

In 2015 he won the fours bronze medal at the Atlantic Bowls Championships.
