= 1981 World Indoor Bowls Championship =

Bowls championship held in Coatbridge, North Lanarkshire

World Indoor Championships 1981
- 3rd World Indoor Bowls Championships
- Location: (Scotland) Coatbridge, North Lanarkshire
- Date(s): 24 February - 01 March, 1981.
- Category: World Indoor Championships

The 1981 Embassy World Indoor Bowls Championship was held at the Coatbridge indoor bowling club, North Lanarkshire, Scotland, from 24 February - 1 March 1981.

David Bryant won his third consecutive title beating Ron Thomas in the final.

== Men's singles ==
=== Group stages ===
Group A results

Player 1	Player 2	Score
Thomas	McKelvey	21-13
Thomas	Murtagh	21-18
Thomas	Duncalf	21-9
Thomas	Bryant	21-16
Bryant	McKelvey	21-18
Bryant	Duncalf	21-19
Bryant	Murtagh	21-4
McKelvey	Murtagh	21-19
McKelvey	Duncalf	21-17
Duncalf	Murtagh	21-13

Pos	Player	P	W
1	(Wales) Ron Thomas	4	4
2	(England) David Bryant	4	3
3	(Republic of Ireland) Bill McKelvey	4	2
4	(Canada) David Duncalf	4	1
5	(New Zealand) John Murtagh	4	0

Group B results

Player 1	Player 2	Score
Bell	Dang	21-19
Bell	Candelet	21-3
Bell	Douglas	21-14
Bell	Moran	21-19
Dang	Candelet	21-14
Dang	Douglas	21-19
Dang	Moran	21-3
Candelet	Moran	21-16
Douglas	Candelet	21-9
Douglas	Moran	21-?

Pos	Player	P	W
1	(England) Derek Bell	4	4
2	(Hong Kong) Gary Dang	4	3
3	(Scotland) Stewart Douglas	4	2
4	(United States) Jim Candelet	4	1
5	(Australia) Des Moran	4	0

=== Medal round ===
Semi-finals
(England) David Bryant	21
(England) Derek Bell	3
(Wales) Ron Thomas	21
(Hong Kong) Gary Dang	7

Gold medal match
(England) David Bryant	21
(Wales) Ron Thomas	17
Third place
(England) Derek Bell	14
(Hong Kong) Gary Dang	3
