= Isabel Jones (bowls) =

Welsh international lawn bowls player

Personal information
- Nationality: British (Welsh)
- Born: 24 December 1955 (age 70) Garthmyl, Welshpool, Wales

Sport
- Club: Berriew BC
Medal record
Representing Wales
World Outdoor Championships
| Silver medal – second place | 2008 Christchurch | fours |
Atlantic Bowls Championships
| Silver medal – second place | 2007 Ayr | triples |
| Gold medal – first place | 2009 Johannesburg | triples |
| Gold medal – first place | 2009 Johannesburg | fours |

Isabel Jones (born 1955) is a Welsh international lawn bowls player.

== Biography ==
In 2008, Jones won a silver medal in the Women's fours competition at the 2008 World Outdoor Bowls Championship in Christchurch and was selected in the Welsh team for the 2010 Commonwealth Games.

In 2007 she won the triples silver medal at the Atlantic Bowls Championships. Two years later in 2009 she won the triples and fours gold medals at the Atlantic Bowls Championships.

In 2025, Jones captured two more Welsh National Bowls Championships titles in the pairs with Caroline Taylor and in the triples with Hazel Wilson, and Kathy Pearce. This brought her total to nine national titles.
