= Lynn Probert =

Welsh lawn bowler (1912–1981)

Personal information
- Nationality: British (Welsh)
- Born: 7 June 1912 Pontypridd, Wales
- Died: 20 February 1981 (aged 68) Abergavenny, Wales

Sport
- Sport: Lawn bowls
- Club: Abergavenny BC
Medal record
Representing Wales
British Isles Championships
Gold medal – first place	1961	fours
National Championships
Gold medal – first place	1960	fours
Gold medal – first place	1963	singles

Ernest Lynn Probert (7 June 1912 – 20 February 1981), was a Welsh international lawn bowler who competed at the British Empire and Commonwealth Games (now Commonwealth Games).

== Biography ==
Probert was a member of the Abergavenny Bowling Club. In 1960 the Abergavenny quartet of Probert, Albert Evans, Claude Stephens and Tom Griffiths won the national fours title at the Welsh National Bowls Championships. Subsequently, the four then won British Isles Bowls Championships in 1961.

Evans represented the 1962 Welsh team at the 1962 British Empire and Commonwealth Games in Perth, Australia in the pairs event and the fours/rinks event, with Tom Griffiths, Albert Evans and Claude Stephens, finishing fifth.

Probert won a second national title in 1963, after he won the singles championship of Wales and continued to represent his country at international level.

Probert died on 20 February 1981 and was living at 89 Park Cresecent, Abergavenny, at the time. He was credited with leading the extension and renovation of the pavilion for the Abergavenny BC and Nevill Ladies' Club, which opened on 4 July 4 1984 (after his death) and which was dedicated to his memory.
