= John Russell Evans =

Lawn bowler (1935–2025)

Personal information
- Nationality: British (Welsh)
- Born: 29 May 1935
- Died: 11 March 2025 (aged 89)

Sport
- Sport: Lawn bowls
- Club: Barry Athletic BC
Medal record
Representing Wales
World Outdoor Championships
Bronze medal – third place	1972 Worthing	triples
Commonwealth Games
Bronze medal – third place	1978 Edmonton	singles
British Isles Championships
Gold medal – first place	1978	singles
Gold medal – first place	1964	fours

John Russell Evans (29 May 1935 – 11 March 2025) was a Welsh international lawn bowler.

== Bowls career ==
Evans won a bronze medal in the triples at the 1972 World Outdoor Bowls Championship in Worthing.

He represented the Welsh team at the 1974 British Commonwealth Games in Christchurch, New Zealand, where he competed in the fours event, with Gareth Humphreys, Ian Sutherland and Dai Richards and just missed the medal rostrum after finishing in fourth place. Four years later he won a bronze medal in singles at the 1978 Commonwealth Games in Edmonton.

He joined the Barry Athletic Bowls Club in 1951 and is a four times Welsh National Champion, winning the singles in 1976 & 1977 and the fours in 1963 & 1969.

He has also won two British Isles Bowls Championships titles, the singles in 1978 and the fours in 1964.

Evans died on 11 March 2025, at the age of 89.
