= Martin Selway =

Personal information
- Nationality: Welsh
- Born: 1966

Sport
- Sport: Lawn bowls
- Club: Caerphilly Town BC
Medal record
Representing Wales
Atlantic Bowls Championships
Gold medal – first place	2007 Ayr	pairs
Bronze medal – third place	2007 Ayr	fours
Bronze medal – third place	2009 Johannesburg	triples
Bronze medal – third place	2009 Johannesburg	fours
British Isles Championships
Gold medal – first place	2009	pairs

Martin Selway (born 1966) is a Welsh international lawn bowler.

== Bowls career ==
He competed for Wales at the 2006 Commonwealth Games and 2010 Commonwealth Games.

In 2007 he won the pairs gold medal and fours bronze medal at the Atlantic Bowls Championships and in 2009 he won the triples and fours bronze medals at the Atlantic Bowls Championships.

He is a four times Welsh champion winning the 1996 & 2008 pairs, 2007 triples and 2006 fours at the Welsh National Bowls Championships and became a British champion winning the 2009 pairs at the British Isles Bowls Championships.
