= David Harding (bowls) =

Welsh bowls player

Personal information
- Nationality: British (Welsh)

Sport
- Sport: Lawn bowls
- Club: Penylan BC
Medal record
Representing Wales
Atlantic Bowls Championships
Bronze medal – third place	2009 Johannesburg	triples
Bronze medal – third place	2009 Johannesburg	fours
British Isles Championships
Gold medal – first place	2003	fours
Welsh Nationals
Gold medal – first place	2002	fours
Gold medal – first place	2015	pairs
Gold medal – first place	2021	fours
European Championships
Gold medal – first place	2011 Portugal	pairs
Gold medal – first place	2011 Portugal	mixed
Gold medal – first place	2011 Portugal	team

David Harding is a Welsh international lawn bowler and indoor.

== Bowls career ==
=== Outdoors ===
In 2009, he won the triples and fours bronze medals at the Atlantic Bowls Championships In 2011, he won three gold medals at the European Bowls Championships in Portugal.

He is a three times Welsh National champion winning the 2002 and 2021 fours and 2015 pairs at the Welsh National Bowls Championships and became a British champion winning the 2003 fours at the British Isles Bowls Championships.

Harding is a former board member of Welsh Bowls and holds the record for most appearances for South Glamorgan.

=== Indoors ===
Harding has also been capped by the Welsh indoor national team.
