= Evan Jones (bowls) =

British lawn bowler

Personal information
- Nationality: British (Welsh)
- Born: Wales

Sport
- Sport: Bowls
- Club: Port Talbot Municipal

Evan Jones is a former Welsh lawn bowler who competed at the Commonwealth Games.

== Biography ==
Jones bowled for the Port Talbot Municipal club and was part of the rinks (fours) team with Danny Prosser, Jack Griffiths and Len Hill that won the 1957 Welsh National Bowls Championships.

The 1957 success led to their selection for the British Commonwealth and Empire Games qualification tournament in Cardiff, which they subsequently won.

He represented the Welsh team at the 1958 British Empire and Commonwealth Games in Cardiff, Wales, where he competed in the fours/rinks event, and helped Wales finish in seventh place with Danny Prosser, Jack Griffiths and Len Hill.

In 1962 he was once again part of the Port Talbot Municipal rinks team that won the Welsh National Championship.
