= Nina Shipperlee =

Personal information
- Nationality: Welsh
- Born: 30 August 1936 (age 89)

Sport
- Club: Whitchurch BC
Medal record
lawn bowls
Commonwealth Games
Bronze medal – third place	2002 Manchester	fours
Atlantic Bowls Championships
Silver medal – second place	1997 Llandrindod Wells	triples

Nina Shipperlee (born 30 August 1936) is a former Welsh international lawn bowler.

== Bowls career ==
Shipperlee won the triples silver medal at the 1997 Atlantic Bowls Championships in Llandrindod Wells.

Five years later, she won the bronze medal in the fours with Gill Miles, Ann Sutherland and Pam John at the 2002 Commonwealth Games in Manchester.

Shipperlee won the National pairs title in 1998 and 1999.

She still bowls for the Whitchurch Bowling Club in North Cardiff and in 1988 became the clubs first member to be capped by Wales.
