= Danny Prosser =

British lawn bowler

Personal information
- Nationality: British (Welsh)
- Born: Wales

Sport
- Sport: Bowls
- Club: Port Talbot Municipal

Danny Prosser is a former Welsh lawn bowler who competed at the Commonwealth Games.

== Biography ==
Prosser bowled for the Port Talbot Municipal club and was part of the rinks (fours) team with Evan Jones, Jack Griffiths and Len Hill that won the 1957 Welsh National Bowls Championships.

The 1957 success led to their selection for the British Commonwealth and Empire Games qualification tournament in Cardiff, which they subsequently won.

He represented the Welsh team at the 1958 British Empire and Commonwealth Games in Cardiff, Wales, where he competed in the fours/rinks event, and helped Wales finish in seventh place with Evan Jones, Jack Griffiths and Len Hill.

In 1962 he was once again part of the Port Talbot Municipal rinks team that won the Welsh National Championship. In 1966 he represented his club against the touring Barbarians team.
