= Spencer Wilshire =

Welsh international lawn and indoor bowler

Personal information
- Nationality: British (Welsh)
- Born: 7 May 1945

Sport
- Club: Tonypandy BC and Gelli Park BC
Medal record
Representing Wales
Commonwealth Games
Silver medal – second place	1982 Brisbane	pairs
British Isles Championships
Gold medal – first place	1976	pairs
Gold medal – first place	1979	pairs
Gold medal – first place	1981	pairs

Spencer Wilshire (born 1945) is a Welsh former international lawn and indoor bowler.

== Bowls career ==
He won a silver medal in the pairs with Lyn Perkins at the 1982 Commonwealth Games in Brisbane.

He was the Welsh National singles champion in 1978. and the pairs champion on four occasions in 1975, 1978, 1980 and 1995.

With Lyn Parkins, he was British champion in the pairs three times in 1976, 1979 and 1981.
