= Ross Owen =

Welsh bowls player

Personal information
- Nationality: British (Welsh)
- Born: 6 January 1994 (age 32) Mountain Ash, Wales

Sport
- Club: Harlequins (outdoors); Cynon Valley (indoors)

Achievements and titles
- Highest world ranking: 3 (February 2026)
Medal record
Representing Wales
Commonwealth Games
Bronze medal – third place	2022 Birmingham	triples
Bowls World Cup
Gold medal – first place	2025 Kuala Lumpur	men's pairs
World Bowls Indoor Championships
Silver medal – second place	2025 Aberdeen	mixed pairs
Bronze medal – third place	2025 Aberdeen	singles
Atlantic Bowls Championships
Bronze medal – third place	2015 Paphos	fours
Bronze medal – third place	2019 Cardiff	fours
British Isles Championships
Gold medal – first place	2018	fours
Gold medal – first place	2019	triples
Gold medal – first place	2024	singles

Ross Owen (born 6 January 1994) is a Welsh lawn and indoor bowler.

He is a Welsh international and reached a career high ranking of world number 3 in February 2026.

== Bowls career ==
Owen won the Welsh National Bowls Championships fours in 2017 and the following year the triples, both National titles were won when bowling for Harlequins BC. He was the National Indoor Pairs Champion in 2014. In 2015 he won the fours bronze medal at the Atlantic Bowls Championships.

Owen bowls for Harlequins (outdoors) and Cynon Valley (indoors) and was selected for the Welsh team for the 2016 World Outdoor Bowls Championship in Avonhead, Christchurch, New Zealand and the 2018 Commonwealth Games on the Gold Coast in Queensland, Australia.

In 2019, he won the fours bronze medal at the Atlantic Bowls Championships and in 2020, he was selected for the 2020 World Outdoor Bowls Championship in Australia but the event was cancelled due to the COVID-19 pandemic. In 2021, Owen reached the final of the pairs and fours at the 2021 Welsh National Bowls Championships.

In 2022, he competed in the men's triples, where he won a bronze medal and the men's fours at the 2022 Commonwealth Games.

In 2023, he was selected as part of the team to represent Wales at the 2023 World Outdoor Bowls Championship. He participated in the men's triples and the men's fours events. Also in 2023, he won his third national title but first singles at the Welsh nationals.

In 2024, he won the singles title at the British Isles Bowls Championships. In 2024, Owen also won the 2024 Welsh National Indoor singles & triples, which qualified him to represent Wales at the 2025 World Bowls Indoor Championships. Subsequently in 2025, Owen paired with Lauren Gowen won the silver medal in the mixed pairs event at the 2025 World Bowls Indoor Championships in Aberdeen. Owen won the gold medal after reaching the final of the 2025 Bowls World Cup, where he partnered Daniel Davies Jr. in the pairs event, beating Paul Foster and Jason Banks in the final.
