= Roger Jones (bowls) =

Personal information
- Nationality: British (Welsh)
- Born: Wales

Sport
- Club: Beaufort BC
Medal record
Representing Wales
British Isles Championships
Gold medal – first place	2009	singles
European Championships
Silver medal – second place	2013 Spain	pairs

Roger Jones is a Welsh international lawn bowler and former British champion.

== Bowls career ==
Jones is twice winner of the Welsh National Bowls Championships singles in 2008 and 2017. After the 2008 victory he subsequently won the singles at the British Isles Bowls Championships in 2009.

In 2013, he won a silver medal at the European Bowls Championships in Spain. He also won the National pairs with John Berry for the Pantaeg Park Bowls Club before switching clubs to Beaufort BC in late 2016, where he won the National fours in 2018.
