= Marc Wyatt =

Welsh lawn bowler

Personal information
- Nickname: Sparky
- Nationality: British (Welsh)
- Born: 15 September 1977 (age 48) Caerphilly, Wales
- Height: 5 ft 9 in (175 cm)
- Weight: 76 kg (168 lb)

Sport
- Sport: Lawn bowls
Medal record
Representing Wales
Men's lawn bowls
Commonwealth Games
Bronze medal – third place	2014 Glasgow	Men's triples
Gold medal – first place	2018 Gold Coast	Men's pairs
Atlantic Bowls Championships
Bronze medal – third place	2009 Johannesburg	triples
Bronze medal – third place	2009 Johannesburg	fours
European Championships
Gold medal – first place	2011 Portugal	pairs
Gold medal – first place	2011 Portugal	mixed
Gold medal – first place	2011 Portugal	team

Marc Wyatt (born 15 September 1977) is a Welsh international lawn bowler.

== Bowls career ==
In 2011, he won three gold medals at the European Bowls Championships in Portugal.

He competed for Wales in the men's triples at the 2014 Commonwealth Games where he won a bronze medal.

He was selected as part of the Welsh team for the 2018 Commonwealth Games on the Gold Coast in Queensland where he claimed a gold medal in the Pairs with Daniel Salmon.

He has also won the 2002 triples title, 2006 fours title and 2017 pairs title at the Welsh National Bowls Championships when bowling for Caerphilly Town BC and in 2009 he won the triples and fours bronze medals at the Atlantic Bowls Championships.
