= Ann Sutherland =

Welsh bowler

Personal information
- Nationality: British (Welsh)
- Born: 26 December 1943 (age 82)

Sport
- Club: Croesyceiliog BC (outdoors); Torfaen BC (indoors)
Medal record
lawn bowls
World Outdoor Championships
Bronze medal – third place	1996 Leamington Spa	triples
Commonwealth Games
Bronze medal – third place	1998 Kuala Lumpur	pairs
Bronze medal – third place	2002 Manchester	fours
Atlantic Bowls Championships
Silver medal – second place	1995 Durban	triples

Ann Sutherland is a former Welsh international lawn and indoor bowler.

== Bowls career ==
She was born in 1943 and in 1995 she won the triples silver medal at the Atlantic Bowls Championships.

In 1998, she won the bronze medal in the pairs with Rita Jones at the 1998 Commonwealth Games in Kuala Lumpur.

Four years later she won another bronze in the fours with Gill Miles, Pam John and Nina Shipperlee at the 2002 Commonwealth Games in Manchester.

She was a Welsh international from 1986 until 2003 and is the winner of three National Indoor Titles.
