= Pam John =

Welsh lawn bowler

Personal information
- Nationality: Welsh
- Born: 3 February 1943 (age 83)

Sport
- Club: Cardiff BC
Medal record
Lawn bowls
Representing Wales
Commonwealth Games
Bronze medal – third place	2002 Manchester	fours
British Isles Championships
Gold medal – first place	1989	triples
Gold medal – first place	2009	triples

Pam John is a former Welsh international lawn bowler.

== Bowls career ==
She was born in 1943 and won the bronze medal in the fours with Gill Miles, Ann Sutherland and Nina Shipperlee at the 2002 Commonwealth Games in Manchester.

She was a Welsh international from 1989 until 1997 and still bowls for the Cardiff Bowling Club.
