= Chris Klefenz =

Welsh lawn bowler

Personal information
- Nationality: British (Welsh)
- Born: 1986 (age 39–40) Pontypool, Wales

Sport
- Sport: Lawn bowls
- Club: Cross Keys BC (outdoors); Blaenau Gwent (indoors)
Medal record
Representing Wales
European Championships
Gold medal – first place	2017 Jersey	mixed four
Welsh Nationals
Gold medal – first place	2018	fours
Gold medal – first place	2022	pairs

Christoph Alexander Klefenz (born 1986) is a Welsh international lawn and indoor bowler.

== Bowls career ==
In 2017, he won a gold medal at the European Bowls Championships. The following year in 2018, he was a member of the fours team that won the Welsh National Bowls Championships. He made his senior international debut in 2019 when selected to play in the Atlantic Championships.

In 2020, he was selected for the 2020 World Outdoor Bowls Championship in Australia but the event was cancelled due to the COVID-19 pandemic. In 2022, Klefenz won his second national title, winning the pairs with Danny Davies Jr. bowling for the Beaufort Club.

In 2023, he was selected as part of the team to represent Wales at the 2023 World Outdoor Bowls Championship. He participated in the men's triples and the men's fours events.
