= Gill Miles =

Welsh international lawn bowler

Personal information
- Nationality: British (Welsh)
- Born: 26 April 1941 (age 85)

Sport
- Sport: Lawn and indoor bowls
- Club: Sophia Gardens BC, Cardiff; Cwmbran IBC, Cardiff IBC
Medal record
Representing Wales
lawn bowls
Commonwealth Games
| Bronze medal – third place | 2002 Manchester | fours |
British Isles Championships
| Gold medal – first place | 1989 | fours |
| Gold medal – first place | 2009 | triples |

Gillian "Gill" Dawn Miles (born 26 April 1941) is a former international lawn and indoor bowler from Wales who competed at the Commonwealth Games.

== Biography ==
Born in 1941, Miles represented the Welsh team at the 1982 Commonwealth Games in Brisbane, Australia, where she competed in the triples event, with Janet Ackland and Margaret Pomeroy.

In 1983, bowling for the Cwmbran Indoor Bowls Club she finished runner-up to Rita Jones in the Welsh national indoor singles.

Miles won a bronze medal in the fours with Ann Sutherland, Pam John and Nina Shipperlee at the 2002 Commonwealth Games in Manchester.

Miles was champion of Wales on nine occasions at the Welsh National Bowls Championships in the pairs in 1991 and 2006, the triples in 1987, 2008 and 2019, the fours in 1985, 1996, 2001 and 2008.

Miles continued to bowl for the Cardiff Bowling Club in age group events. Gill is also a former Welsh captain and her mother Mavis Bellamy was also capped by Wales.
