= Wendy Price =

Welsh lawn bowls player

Personal information
- Nationality: Welsh
- Born: 6 March 1972 (age 54) Llandrindod Wells
Medal record
Representing Wales
World Outdoor Championships
Silver medal – second place	2008 Christchurch	fours
Atlantic Bowls Championships
Gold medal – first place	2009 Johannesburg	triples
Gold medal – first place	2009 Johannesburg	fours

Wendy Price (born 1972) is a Welsh international lawn bowls player.

In 2008, she won a silver medal in the Women's fours competition at the 2008 World Outdoor Bowls Championship in Christchurch and was selected in the Welsh team for the 2010 Commonwealth Games.

In 2009 she won the triples and fours gold medals at the Atlantic Bowls Championships.
