= Lyn Perkins =

British lawn bowler

Personal information
- Nationality: British (Welsh)

Sport
- Club: Tonypandy BC; Gelli Park BC
Medal record
Representing Wales
Commonwealth Games
Silver medal – second place	1982 Brisbane	pairs
British Isles Championships
Gold medal – first place	1976	pairs
Gold medal – first place	1979	pairs
Gold medal – first place	1981	pairs

Lyn Perkins is a Welsh former international lawn and indoor bowler and coach.

== Biography ==
He won a silver medal in the pairs with Spencer Wilshire at the 1982 Commonwealth Games in Brisbane. He is a three times Welsh National Champion, winning the pairs with Wilshire in 1975, 1978 and 1980, when bowling for the Tonypandy Bowls Club.

With Spencer Wilshire, he was British champion in the pairs three times in 1976, 1979 and 1981.

He was the coach for the lawn bowls team at the 2006 Commonwealth Games in Melbourne.
