= Jonathan Tomlinson =

Welsh lawn bowler

Personal information
- Nationality: British (Welsh)
- Born: 1 July 1982 (age 43) Neath, Wales
- Home town: Abertillery, Wales
- Height: 5 ft 11 in (180 cm)
- Weight: 82 kg (181 lb)

Sport
- Sport: bowls
- Club: RTB Ebbw Vale
Medal record
Men's lawn bowls
Representing Wales
Commonwealth Games
Bronze medal – third place	2014 Glasgow	triples
Bronze medal – third place	2022 Birmingham	triples
Atlantic Bowls Championships
Silver medal – second place	2011 Paphos	singles
Bronze medal – third place	2019 Cardiff	triples

Jonathan Tomlinson (born 1 July 1982) is a Welsh international lawn bowler.

== Bowls career ==
In 2011 he won the singles silver medal at the Atlantic Bowls Championships.

He competed for Wales in the men's triples at the 2014 Commonwealth Games where he won a bronze medal. Four years later he was selected as part of the Welsh team for the 2018 Commonwealth Games on the Gold Coast in Queensland

He was the Welsh National singles champion in 2015 and pairs winner in 2019.

In 2019 he won the fours bronze medal at the Atlantic Bowls Championships and in 2020 he was selected for the 2020 World Outdoor Bowls Championship in Australia. In 2022, he competed in the men's triples, where he won a bronze medal and the men's fours at the 2022 Commonwealth Games.

== Family ==
His father John was the 1995 Welsh champion and his brother Ross is an international bowler and the 2010 Welsh champion.
