= John Burns (weightlifter) =

British weightlifter (born 1948)

Personal information
- Nationality: British (Welsh)
- Born: 21 November 1948 (age 77) Port Talbot, Wales
- Height: 172 cm (5 ft 8 in)
- Weight: 109 kg (17 st 2 lb)

Sport
- Sport: Weightlifting
- Event: Heavyweight

John Robert Burns (born 21 December 1948) is a British weightlifter. He competed at the 1976 Summer Olympics and the 1980 Summer Olympics.
