= Maldwyn Evans =

Welsh bowler (1937–2009)

Mal Evans
Personal information
- Nationality: British (Welsh)
- Born: 8 November 1937 Gelli, Rhondda
- Died: 30 December 2009 (aged 72) Ton Pentre, Rhondda

Sport
- Sport: Lawn bowls
- Club: Gelli Park BC
Medal record
Representing Wales
World Outdoor Championships
| Gold medal – first place | 1972 Worthing | Men's singles |

Maldwyn Lewis Evans (8 November 1937 – 30 December 2009), often known as "Mal" Evans, was a Welsh bowls champion, who won the World Championship in 1972. He is the only Welshman ever to have held the men's world singles title.

== Personal life ==
Evans was part of a famous bowls family. He was born in Gelli, Rhondda. His father, Clifford Maldwyn Evans (1904-1985) and uncle John Morgan Evans (1917-1985), a world-class player, won the Welsh Pairs Championship in 1952.

Maldwyn Evans was educated at Pentre Secondary School and later obtained a degree in history from University College of North Wales Bangor. He worked as a teacher in Swansea, Porth, Tonypandy and Ferndale.

== Bowls career ==
Evans played bowls for Wales from 1967 until 1985, and he was a member of the Gelli Park club.

Two years after his World Championship win he represented Wales at the 1974 Commonwealth Games in the singles.

He won two Welsh National Bowls Championships Pairs titles in 1966 and 1967, with his brother Gwyn Evans (the 1978 Commonwealth Games fours bronze medal winner). In addition he won the Gibson-Watt Welsh Open Singles at Llandrindod Wells three times (1964, 1966 and 1967).

== Death ==
He died in his home at Ton Pentre, Rhondda, aged 72, and was cremated at Pontypridd.
