= Len Hill (bowls) =

British lawn bowler

Personal information
- Nationality: British (Welsh)
- Born: Wales

Sport
- Sport: Bowls
- Club: Port Talbot Municipal

Len Hill was a Welsh lawn bowler who competed at the Commonwealth Games.

== Biography ==
Hill bowled for the Port Talbot Municipal club and was the pairs champion at the Welsh National Bowls Championships, bowling with J. Miles. He was also the rinks (fours) champion at the Welsh National Bowls Championships in 1937, 1939 and 1941, with Jack Griffiths, J. Miles and J. B. Davies.

He made his debut international appearance for Wales in 1937.

He later teamed up with Jack Griffiths in the pairs and after two final appearances in 1943 and 1950, he won a second pairs title at the 1957 Welsh Nationals. The same year he was part of the rinks (fours) team with Evan Jones, Danny Prosser and Jack Griffiths that won the 1957 National Bowls Championships.

The 1957 fours success led to his selection for the British Commonwealth and Empire Games qualification tournament in Cardiff, which they subsequently won, although he was forced to withdraw from the pairs due to him not being able to take part in more than one event at the Games.

He represented the Welsh team at the 1958 British Empire and Commonwealth Games in Cardiff, Wales, where he competed in the fours/rinks event, and helped Wales finish in seventh place with Evan Jones, Danny Prosser and Len Hill.

In 1962 he was once again part of the Port Talbot Municipal rinks team that won the Welsh National Championship.
