= Dai Wilkins =

British lawn bowler

Personal information
- Nationality: British (Welsh)
- Born: 22 July 1942 (age 83)

Sport
- Club: Pontrhydyfen (outdoors); Port Talbot (indoors)
Medal record
Representing Wales
Commonwealth Games
Bronze medal – third place	1998 Kuala Lumpur	fours
Bronze medal – third place	2002 Manchester	fours
British Isles Championships
Gold medal – first place	2014	fours

David Wilkins better known as Dai Wilkins (born 22 July 1942) is a former Welsh international lawn and indoor bowler.

== Bowls career ==
Wilkins was the youngest ever winner of the Neath Bowls Open in 1969. The following year he represented the Welsh team, at the 1970 British Commonwealth Games in Edinburgh, Scotland, where he participated in the singles competition.

He went on to win two Commonwealth Games bronze medals in the fours at the 1998 Commonwealth Games in Kuala Lumpur and the 2002 Commonwealth Games in Manchester.

He is a seven times Welsh National Bowls Championships winner, winning the singles in 1983 & 1996, the pairs in 1987 with his son Jeff, triples winner in 1986 & 1991 and fours winner in 2012 & 2013.

== Football ==
He had a soccer trial with Cardiff City F.C. before playing rugby for Glynneath RFC.
