= List of Welsh women =

This is an alphabetical list of Welsh women.

== A ==
- Catrin Aaron, actress
- Jane Aaron (born 1951), literature scholar, researcher, non-fiction writer
- Alice Abadam (1856–1940), suffragist, feminist, public speaker
- Jessie Ace (1860 – after 1883), known for her rescue of crewmen from the Mumbles lifeboat
- Juliet Ace (1938–2025), dramatist, screenwriter
- Janet Ackland (1938–2019), bowler
- Anne Adams (born 1960), swimmer
- Helen Adams (born 1978), television personality
- Thelma Adams (1938–2024), farmer, activist
- Sian Adey-Jones (born 1957), model, actress
- Adwen (5th century), Christian virgin and saint
- Afrella (6th century), Welsh saint
- Behnaz Akhgar (born 1980), weather presenter
- Wendy Albiston (born 1969), actress
- Jane Alexander (born 1958), swimmer
- Sue Alfieri (born 1949), badminton player
- Samira Mohamed Ali (born 1985), model, actress
- Elena Allen (born 1972), sport shooter
- Emily Allen (born 1992), footballer
- Jessica Allen (born 1989), racing cyclist
- Sadie Allen (1930–2017), artist
- Alys ferch Owain Glyndŵr (fl. 15th century), daughter of Margaret Hanmer and Owain Glyndŵr
- Jan Anderson (born 1974), actress
- Sophie Anderson, author
- Edith Lovell Andrews (1886–1980), painter, decorative artist
- Elizabeth Andrews (1882–1960), suffragist, writer
- Angharad ferch Llywelyn (fl. 1260), princess
- Angharad ferch Meurig (fl. c. 875 CE), noblewoman
- Gwenllian Anthony, musician
- Manon Antoniazzi (born 1965), senior civil servant
- Tonia Antoniazzi (born 1971), politician
- Shash Appan, LGBT+ and anti-racist activist
- Thelwyn Appleby (born 1944), track and field athlete
- Josie d'Arby (born 1972), actress, writer, television presenter
- Jane Arden (1927–1982), film director, actress, screenwriter, playwright, poet
- Lily Argent (1886–1916), petty criminal, prostitute
- Hollie Arnold (born 1994), parasport athlete
- Kim Ashfield (born 1959), model
- Robyn Ashworth (born 1981), badminton player
- Natasha Asghar, Welsh Conservatives politician
- Laura Ashley (1925–1985), fashion designer
- Sarah Atherton (born 1967), politician
- Tiffany Atkinson (born 1972), poet, educator
- Edith Austin (1867–1953), tennis player
- Trezza Azzopardi (born 1961), widely translated novelist, short story writer, author of The Hiding Place
- Manon Awst, artist
- Rakie Ayola (born 1968), actress

== B ==
- Delyth Badder, folklorist, writer and the world's first Welsh-speaking consultant paediatric and perinatal pathologist
- Emilia Baeyertz (1842–1926), Christian missionary
- Prano Bailey-Bond (born 1982), film director, screenwriter
- Joan Baker (1922–2017), painter, art teacher
- Naz Ball, footballer
- Mary Balogh (born 1944), Welsh-Canadian historical novelist
- Iona Banks (1920–2008), actress
- Roanne Bardsley, TV screenwriter
- Elinor Barker (born 1994), racing cyclist
- Megan Barker (born 1997), racing cyclist
- Jacqueline Barnett (born c. 1939), track and field athlete
- Lorraine Barrett (born 1950), politician
- Rachel Barrett (1874–1953), suffragette, newspaper editor
- Kayleigh Barton (born 1988), footballer, football coach
- Kirsty Barton (born 1992), footballer
- Ella Barnwell (born 2001), track and road cyclist
- Betty Bartlett-Ambatielos (1917–2011), communist activist
- Shirley Bassey (born 1937), singer
- Audrey Bates (1922–2001), table tennis player, tennis player, squash player, lacrosse player
- Elaine Batley, member of the Kidwelly sex cult
- Elynor Bäckstedt (born 2001), racing cyclist
- Zoe Bäckstedt (born 2004), racing cyclist
- Anne Beale (1816–1900), popular novelist, poet, children's writer
- Chelsea Beard, netball player
- Eileen Beasley (1921–2012), teacher, campaigner
- Remy Beasley (active since 2015), actress
- Pat Beavan (born 1951), swimmer
- Beverley Lawrence Beech (1944–2023), author, chair of the Association for Improvements in the Maternity Services, campaigner against the medicalisation of pregnancy and birth
- Cheryl Beer, author, folk singer, multi-media artist
- Eirlys Bellin (active since 2000), actress
- Amanda Bennett (born 1964), rugby union player
- Anna Maria Bennett (1746–1808), novelist
- Tara Bethan (born 1983), actress, singer, presenter
- Bridget Bevan (1698–1779), educationalist and public benefactor
- Julie Bevan (born 1952), swimmer
- Keira Bevan (born 1997), rugby union player
- Latalia Bevan (born 2001), artistic gymnast
- Margaret Bevan (c. 1894–1953), evangelist, singer
- Teleri Bevan (1931–2020), the founding editor of BBC Radio Wales
- Ruth Bidgood (1922–2022), poet, local historian
- Alison Bielski (1925–2014), poet, writer
- Saint Bilo (fl. 5th century), daughter of King Brychan
- Jenny-Anne Bishop (born 1946), transgender activist
- Linda Blake, badminton player
- Joyce Bland (1906–1963), film actress
- Rachael Bland (1978–2018), journalist, presenter
- Helen Bleazard (born 1990), footballer
- Nest Bloet (died 1224 or 1225), noblewoman
- Hannah Blythyn (born 1979), politician
- Christina Booth (born 1965), progressive rock vocalist and singer-songwriter
- Emma Louise Booth (born 1974), singer
- Di Botcher (born 1959), actress
- Amy Boulden (born 1993), golfer
- Dawn Bowden (born 1960), politician
- Evelyn Bowen (1911–1994), actress, director, writer, editor, educator
- Ffion Bowen (born 1991), rugby union player
- Zonia Bowen (1926–2024), writer, linguist, activist
- Alexandra Boyd, actress, director, screenwriter, producer
- Ashley Brace (born 1991), bare-knuckle boxer
- Lesley Brannan (born 1976), hammer thrower
- Eleanor de Braose (c. 1228 – 1251), noblewoman
- Isabella de Braose (c. 1222 – c. 1248), eldest daughter of William de Braose
- Margaret de Braose (died after 1255), noblewomn
- Matilda de Braose, wife of Rhys Mechyll
- Nan Braunton (1895–1978), actress
- Olivia Breen (born 1996), Paralympian athlete
- Michaela Breeze (born 1979), weightlifter
- Johanne Brekke (born 1978), sports shooter
- Lynwen Brennan (born 1967), corporate executive, co-president of Lucasfilm
- Jane Brereton (1685–1740), poet, contributor to The Gentleman's Magazine
- Becky Brewerton (born 1982), golfer
- Hannah Brier (born 1998), sprinter
- Audrey Briggs (born 1945), golfer
- Sue Brimble (born c. 1950), badminton player
- Leonora Brito (1954–2007), writer
- Beata Brookes (1930–2015), social worker, company secretary, Conservative Party (UK) politician
- Charlie Brooks (born 1981), actress
- Rhoda Broughton (1840–1920), novelist, short story writer
- Amy Brown, psychologist
- Julie Dorne Brown, actress, dancer, TV personality
- Mia Arnesby Brown (1867–1931), painter
- Michelle Brown (born 1969), politician
- Shelagh Browning (1917–1976), swimmer
- Tegwen Bruce-Deans (born 2000), writer
- Jayne Bryant, politician
- Eleanor Bufton (1842–1893), actress
- Fanny Bulkeley-Owen (1845–1927), historian, writer
- Chloe Bull (born 1994), footballer
- Seren Bundy-Davies (born 1994), track and field sprinter
- Frances Bunsen (1791–1876), painter, writer
- Liza Burgess (born 1964), rugby union player
- Emily Burnett (born 1997), actress
- Eleanor Burnham, politician
- Angela Burns, politician
- Kezia Burrows, actress
- Janet Burton, professor of medieval history
- Henrietta Bussell (1917–1996), railway engineer
- Rosemary Butler (born 1943), politician
- Anwen Butten, bowls player
- Danielle Bux (born 1979), actress, model

== C ==
- Betsi Cadwaladr (1789–1860), nurse in the Crimean War
- Hannah Cain (born 1999), footballer
- Julia Callan-Thompson (1944–1979), model, designer, socialite
- Alex Callender (born 2000), rugby union player
- Saint Callwen (6th century), Christian saint
- Betty Campbell (1934–2017), community activist, Wales' first black head teacher
- Eliza Constantia Campbell (1796–1864), author
- Saint Canna (6th century), nun
- Bronwen Cardy-Wise (born 1952), long-distance runner
- Charlotte Carey (born 1996), table tennis player
- Olwen Carey Evans (1892–1990), humanitarian
- Jazmin Carlin (born 1990), swimmer
- Nia Caron (active since 1980s), Welsh-language actress
- Kathleen E. Carpenter (1891–1970), freshwater ecologist
- Manon Carpenter (born 1993), racing cyclist
- Emma Catherwood (born 1978), actress, model
- Catrin ferch Gruffudd ap Hywel (fl. 1555), poet
- Catrin ferch Owain Glyndŵr (died 1413), princess
- Jo Caulfield (born 1963), comedian, author
- Jane Cave (c. 1754 – 1812), English-language poet
- Leanda Cave (born 1978)
- Doreen Chadwick (1918–2014), pianist, theatre organist
- Maud Chaworth (1282–1322), noblewoman, heiress
- Christine Chapman (born 1956), politician
- Brenda Chamberlain (1912–1971), artist, poet
- Nadia Chambers (born 1968), actress
- Sue Charles, TV and weather presenter
- Kara Chesworth (born 1972), racing cyclist
- Rebecca Chin (born 1991), rower, discus and shot put thrower
- Chloe Chivers (born 1999), footballer
- Shefali Chowdhury (born 1988), actress
- Sybil Christopher (1929–2013), actress, theatre director
- Charlotte Church (born 1986), singer
- Maureen Elizabeth Church (born 1930), botanist, illustrator
- Isabel de Clare (c. 1172 – 1220), suo jure 4th Countess of Pembroke and Striguil
- Morfydd Clark (born 1989), actress
- Olivia Clark (born 2001), footballer
- Petula Clark (born 1932), singer, actress, songwriter
- Sarah Clark (born 1965), Anglican bishop
- Gillian Clarke (born 1937), poet, playwright, translator, broadcaster
- Rhian Cleverly (born 1995), footballer
- Ann Clwyd (1937–2023), Welsh Labour politician
- Hafina Clwyd (1936–2011), educator, writer
- Lady Jean Cochrane (1887–1955), aristocrat
- Winifred Cochrane, Countess of Dundonald (1859–1924), philanthropist, heiress, noblewoman
- Natasha Cockram (born 1992), marathon runner
- Grace Coddington (born 1941), fashion writer, director of Vogue, memoirist
- Rachel K Collier, electronic music producer and performer
- Rosamund Colman (1885–1950), golfer, tennis player
- Alys Conran, writer
- Nicole Cooke (born 1983), racing cyclist
- Audrey Coombs (1928–2016), table tennis player
- Kate Coppack (born 1994), cricketer
- Lu Corfield (born 1979 or 1980), actress
- Ellie Coster (born 1996), track cyclist
- Shân Cothi (born 1965), singer, actress, presenter
- Melanie Counsell (born 1964), artist
- Glenys Cour (born 1924), painter, stained glass artist
- Margaret Courtenay (1923–1996), actress, singer, entertainer
- Melissa Courtney-Bryant (born 1993), middle- and long-distance runner
- Nicola Cousins (born 1988), footballer
- Gwen Crabb (born 1999), rugby union player
- Julie Crane (born 1976), track and field athlete
- Kizzy Crawford, singer-songwriter
- Elinor Crawley (born 1991), actress
- Gabrielle Creevy (born 1996), actress
- Creirwy, figure in The Mabinogion and The Hanes Taliesin
- Leila Crerar, actress
- Jasmine Cresswell (born 1941), best selling novelist
- Cristin ferch Goronwy (born c. 1105 AD), second wife of Owain Gwynedd
- Jade Croot, actress
- Katy Cropper, shepherd, dog trainer
- Virginia Crosbie (born 1966), politician, nuclear industry advocate
- Maud Cunnington (1869–1951), archaeologist
- Joan Curran (1916–1999), physicist
- Ellie Curson (born 1994), footballer
- Katie Curtis (born 1988), road and track cyclist
- Claire Curtis-Thomas (born 1958), Labour Party politician, chartered engineer

== D ==
- Einir Dafydd, singer
- Fflur Dafydd (born 1978), novelist, playwright, poet, singer, writes in Welsh and English
- Siân Melangell Dafydd (born 1977), novelist, poet, translator
- Ann Dainton (born 1940), lawn and indoor bowls player
- Bethan Dainton (born 1989), rugby league player
- Daisy, Princess of Pless (1873–1943), noted society beauty
- Ceri Dallimore (born 1974), sports shooter
- Hannah Daniel (born 1986), actress
- Jennifer Daniel (1936–2017), film actress
- Eleanor Daniels (1886–1994), actress
- Laura Daniels (born 1985), lawn and indoor bowls player
- Josie d'Arby, TV presenter, actress
- Lisa Lee Dark (born 1981), opera singer, voice actress
- Jane Davidson (born 1957), politician
- Agnes Davies (1920–2011), snooker player, billiards player
- Alexa Davies (born 1995), actress
- Amber Davies (born 1996), actress, reality television personality
- Ann Davies (1914–1954), actress, translator
- Ann Davies, Plaid Cymru politician
- Bethan Davies (born 1990), racewalker
- Betty Davies (1917–2018), radio drama producer and director, dramatist
- Catherine Glyn Davies (1926–2007), historian, translator
- Cissy Davies (1932–2005), gymnast
- Clara Novello Davies (1861–1943), singer and conductor
- Deddie Davies (1938–2016), actress
- Deborah Kay Davies, contemporary poet, novelist, educator
- Diana Davies (born 1940), swimmer
- Donna E. Davies, biochemist, professor
- Edna Davies (1905–1969), actress
- Ffion Davies (born 1995), submission grappler
- Georgia Davies (born 1990), swimmer
- Gilli Davies, Cordon Bleu cook, food journalist
- Gwenan Davies (born 1994), cricketer
- Gwendoline Davies (1882–1951), philanthropist, arts patron
- Jennie Eirian Davies (1925–1982), politician, magazine editor
- Jennifer Davies (born 1982), rugby union player
- Jess Davies (born 1993), radio personality, TV presenter, campaigner, influencer, model
- Jocelyn Davies (born 1959), politician
- Kally Davies, electropop musician
- Karen Davies (born 1965), golfer
- Llewela Davies (1871–1952), pianist and composer
- Lynette Davies (1948–1993), actress
- Margaret Davies (c. 1700 – 1778 or 1785), poet, scribe
- Margaret Davies (1884–1963), arts patron
- Mary Davies, lawn bowls player
- Mary Davies (1855–1930), mezzo-soprano
- Mary Davies (1846–1882), poet
- Mayzee Davies (born 2006), footballer
- Megan Davies (born 2002), rugby union player
- Merryl Wyn Davies (1949–2021), Muslim scholar, writer, broadcaster
- Myriel Davies (1920–2000), peace activist
- Nicola Davies (born 1953), barrister, judge
- Nicola Davies (born 1985), footballer
- Nina Davies (born 1974), racing cyclist
- Petra Davies (1930–2016), actress
- Phoebe Davies (1864–1912), Welsh-born American actress
- Rachel Davies (1846–1915), lecturer and evangelist preacher
- Rose Davies (1882–1958), teacher, feminist, labour activist, politician
- Steph Davies (born 1987), cricketer
- Stevie Davies, novelist, essayist, short story writer
- Suzy Davies, politician
- Tammy-Jay Davies, electropop musician
- Teleri Wyn Davies (born 1997), rugby union player
- Valerie Davies (1912–2001), swimmer
- Victoria Davies (born 1972), tennis player
- Alex Davies-Jones (born 1989), politician
- Rhiannon Davies Jones (1921–2014), historical novelist, lecturer, Welsh nationalist
- Joan Davis (1911–2004), cricketer
- Alice Davy (fl. 15th – 16th century), servant at the Tudor court in England
- Laura Dawkes, actress
- Cathy Dawson (born 1966), runner
- Rachel Dawson, author
- Doris E. Day (1872–1966), archer
- Gwladus Ddu (died 1251), member of the Royal House of Gwynedd
- Rebecca De Filippo (born 1994), rugby union player
- Venetia Dearden (born 1975), photographer, filmmaker
- Cherry Dee (born 1987), model
- Sophie Dee (born 1984), pornographic actress
- Jen Delyth (born 1962), specializing in Celtic symbolism
- Marian Delyth (born 1954), photographer, designer
- Mary Dendy (1855–1933), promoter of residential schools for mentally handicapped people
- Anne Denholm (born 1991), harpist
- Myrtle Devenish (1913–2007), actress
- Marina Diamandis (born 1985), singer-songwriter
- Lucy Dickenson (1980–2012), humanitarian, social entrepreneur, singer-songwriter
- Angela Dickson (born 1944), badminton player
- Carol Difford (born c. 1952), lawn bowler
- Amy Dillwyn (1845–1935), novelist, industrialist
- Mary Dillwyn (1816–1906), photographer
- Thereza Dillwyn Llewelyn (1834–1926), photographer, astronomer
- Mary Anne Disraeli (1792–1872), peeress
- Lisa Diveney (born 1984), actress
- Joyce Dixon (born 1945), swimmer
- Leah Dixon (born 1991), racing cyclist
- Magi Dodd (1977–2021), radio presenter and producer
- Jane Dodds (born 1963), politician
- Stella Donnelly (born 1992), indie rock singer-songwriter, guitarist
- Frances Donovan, journalist, presenter
- Laura Douglas (born 1983), hammer thrower
- Gloria Dourass (born c. 1945), track and field athlete
- Edith Downing (1857–1931), artist, sculptor, suffragette
- Suzy Drane (born 1986), netball player
- Lauren Drew (born 1993), actress, singer
- Layla Drury (born 2009), footballer
- Aimée Ann Duffy (born 1984), singer, songwriter
- Blanche Duncan (1879–1927), golfer
- Mari Ellis Dunning (born 1993), writer
- Ruth Dunning (1911–1983), actress
- Tamsin Dunwoody (born 1958), politician
- Milly Durrant (born 1985), footballer
- Jasmin Dutton (born 1992), footballer
- Dwynwen (fl. 5th century), Welsh patron saint of lovers
- Dwywe (fl. 5th or 6th century), pre-congregational saint of Wales
- Bethan Dyke (born 1994), netball player
- Loren Dykes (born 1988), footballer, football coach
- Shirley Dynevor (1933–2023), actress

== E ==
- Jean Earle (1909–2002), poet
- Eleri Earnshaw (born 1985), footballer, football coach
- Kate Eaves (born 1968), rugby union player
- Rosie Eccles (born 1996), boxer
- Mary Anne Edmunds (1813–1858), educator
- Rhian Edmunds (born 2003), track cyclist
- Aimee-Ffion Edwards (born 1987), actress
- Catrin Edwards (born 1980), rugby union player
- Donna Edwards (born 1963), actress
- Dorothy Edwards (1902–1934), novelist, short story writer
- Dorothy Edwards (1917–1979), actress
- Fanny Winifred Edwards (1876–1959), schoolteacher, children's writer, dramatist
- Gwawr Edwards (born c. 1984), concert soprano
- Maudie Edwards (1906–1991), actress, singer, comedian
- Penny Edwards, cyclist
- Rhian Edwards (active from 2000s), poet
- Sara Edwards (born 1960), broadcast journalist, television presenter
- Sarah Edwards (1881–1965), Welsh born American actress
- Sonia Edwards, poet, writer
- Diana Edwards-Jones (1932–2024), television director
- Eleanor de Montfort (1252–1282), noblewoman, Welsh princess
- Saint Elen (fl. late-4th century), founder of churches in Wales
- Elen Egryn (1807–1876), Welsh-language poet
- Elen ferch Llywelyn c. 1207–1253), princess
- Sian Eleri (born 1994), radio DJ, TV presenter
- Bethan Elfyn, presenter
- Menna Elfyn (born 1952), Welsh-language poet, playwright, columnist, editor, poetry widely translated
- Sarra Elgan (born 1979), journalist, presenter
- Elio (born 1998), singer, songwriter, producer
- Gillian Elisa (born 1953), actress, singer, comedian
- Elizabeth of Rhuddlan (1282–1316), eighth and youngest daughter of Edward I of England
- Mary Elizabeth Ellis (1881–1974), peace activist
- Saint Elli (fl. 6th century), Welsh saint
- Louise Elliott (born 1969), broadcaster, journalist
- Mari Ellis (1913–2015), writer, women's rights activist
- Ruth Ellis (1926–1955), nightclub hostess, murderer
- Shirley Ellis (born 1952), cricketer, field hockey player
- Bethan Ellis Owen (active since 1990s), actress
- Saint Eluned (fl. 5th or 6th century), virgin martyr
- Annes Elwy (born 1953), actress
- Dilys Elwyn-Edwards (1918–2012), composer, lecturer, accompanist
- Emma of Anjou (c. 1140 – c. 1214), illegitimate daughter of Count Geoffrey V of Anjou
- Endelient (fl. 5th or 6th century), Cornish saint, believed to be a daughter of the Welsh King Brychan
- Peg Entwistle (1908–1932), actress
- Erfyl (fl. 15th century), virgin
- Elizabeth Ernest-James (born 1946), tennis player
- Marged Esli (1949–2025), actress
- Sue Essex (born 1945), politician
- Charlie Estcourt (born 1998), footballer
- Esyllt ferch Cynan Dindaethwy (fl. 8th century), princess of the Kingdom of Gwynedd
- Gwladys Evan Morris (1879–1957), actress, writer
- Alice Evans (born 1994), footballer, futsal player
- Alice Margaret Evans (1927–1981), botanist
- Amy Evans (1884–1983), soprano, actress
- Amy Evans (born 1990), rugby union player
- Carol Evans (1938–2007), cricketer
- Christine Evans (born 1943), poet
- Clara Evans (born 1993), long-distance runner
- Eleanor Evans (1893–1969), actress, singer, stage director
- Elen Evans (born 1985), rugby union player
- Elinor Evans (born 1982), painter
- Felicity Evans, journalist, broadcaster
- Gemma Evans (born 1996), footballer
- Georgia Evans (born 1995), footballer
- Georgia Evans (born 1997), rugby union player
- Irene Evans, swimmer
- Jennifer Evans (born 1982), actress
- Jenny Evans, investigative journalist, producer
- Jessie Evans (actress) (1918–1983), actress
- Jill Evans (born 1959), Plaid Cymru politician
- Kate Williams Evans (1866–1961), suffragette and activist for women's rights
- Laura Evans (born 1986), actress, singer, songwriter
- Laura Evans (born 1986), snooker player
- Linda Evans, lawn and indoor bowls player
- Lynne Evans (born 1948), archer
- Margiad Evans (1909–1958), poet, novelist
- Mary Evans (1735–1789), sect leader
- Mary Jane Evans (1888–1922), teacher, preacher, actress
- Maureen Evans (born 1940), pop singer
- Maxine Evans (born 1966), actress
- Nancy Evans (1903–1998), table tennis player
- Nerys Evans (born 1980), politician
- Non Evans (born 1974), sportswoman, TV personality
- Pat Evans (1926–2020), gymnast
- Polly Evans, journalist, broadcaster, producer, former anchor
- Rachel Evans, chemist
- Rebecca Evans, operatic soprano
- Ruby Evans (born 2007), artistic gymnast
- Shellyann Evans, singer
- Sian Evans (born 1971), singer
- Siân Evans, historical author, journalist, film consultant
- Sophie Evans (born 1993), singer, actress
- Laura Evans-Williams (1883–1944), soprano

== F ==
- Lucie de la Falaise (born 1973), design consultant, model, socialite
- Val Feld (1947–2001), Welsh Labour Party politician
- Kerry Ferguson, politician, mayor
- Pam Ferris (born 1948), actress
- Elin Fflur (born 1984), singer-songwriter, presenter
- Pamela Field, operatic soprano
- Anna Filbey (born 1999), footballer
- Penelope Fillon (born 1955), wife of French former politician François Fillon
- Catrin Finch (born 1980), harpist, arranger and composer
- Janet Finch-Saunders (born 1958), politician
- Ilora Finlay, Baroness Finlay of Llandaff (born 1949), physician, politician
- Emma Finucane (born 2002), track cyclist
- Beth Fisher, field hockey athlete, sports reporter, presenter
- Catherine Fisher (born 1957), novelist, poet, broadcaster
- Connie Fisher (born 1983), actress, singer
- Jess Fishlock (born 1987), footballer, football coach
- Abbie Fleming (born 1996), rugby union player
- Melissa Fletcher (born 1992), footballer
- Patti Flynn (1937–2020), jazz singer, author, model, social activist
- Catherine Fookes (born 1970), Labour Party politician
- Laura Ford (born 1961), sculptor
- Lisa Forey (born 1977), lawn and indoor bowls player
- Flora Forster (1896–1981), educator, writer
- Cheryl Foster (born 1980), football referee, footballer
- Dawn Foster (1986–2021), journalist, broadcaster, author
- Dion Fortune (1890–1946), occultist, ceremonial magician, writer
- Sabrina Fortune (born 1997), track and field athlete
- Annie Foulkes (1877–1962), writer, teacher
- Isabelle Jane Foulkes (1970–2001), artist, textile designer, disability campaigner
- Claire Fox (born 1960), writer, journalist, lecturer, politician
- Geraldine Francis (1942–1977), swimmer
- Lisa Francis (born 1960), politician
- Maria Francis (born 1969), slalom canoeist
- Rosemarie Frankland (1943–2000), actress, model
- Bobby Freeman, writer, journalist, TV presenter, cook
- Jane Freeman (1935–2017), actress
- Jocelyn Freeman (born 1986), pianist
- Kathleen Freeman (1897–1959), classicist
- Gemma Frizelle (born 1998), rhythmic gymnast
- Rosalie K. Fry (1911–1992), author, illustrator
- Liz Fuller (born 1975), television presenter, actress, model
- Heledd Fychan (born 1980), politician
- Myfanwy Fychan (born mid-14th century), noblewoman

== G ==
- Menna Gallie (1919–1990), novelist, translator
- Felicity Gallup (born 1969), badminton player
- Bethan Gammon (born 2001), cricketer
- Valerie Ganz (1936–2015), painter
- Talisa García (born 1977 or 1978), actress
- Jessica Garlick (born 1981), pop singer
- Jacqui Gasson (c. 1938–2020), lord mayor of Cardiff
- Valerie Gearon (1937–2003), actress
- Janet Gedrych (born 1958), rugby union player
- Beti George (born 1939), journalist and broadcaster
- Lleucu George (born 2000), rugby union player
- Gill German, politician
- Veronica German (born 1957), politician
- Gwenan Gibbard, musician, singer
- Seren Gibson (born 1988), model
- Sian Gibson (born 1976), actress, television writer
- Isabella Gifford (1825–1891), botanist
- Olive Gilbert (1898–1981), singer, actress
- Annabel Giles (born 1950), broadcaster, best selling novelist, actress
- Liz Gill, track and field athlete
- Cheryl Gillan (1952–2021), politician
- Julia Gillard (born 1961), Australian prime minister
- Mary Gillham (1921–2013), naturalist, lecturer, writer
- Sophie Gilliat-Ray (born 1969), academic of religious studies
- Becky Gittins (born 1994), politician
- Catherine Gladstone (1812–1900), wife of British statesman William Ewart Gladstone
- Ani Glass (born 1984), musician, artist, producer, photographer
- Gwyneth Glyn (born 1979), poet, musician
- Mary Glynne (1895–1954), actress
- Mary Dilys Glynne (1895–1991), plant pathologist, mountaineer
- Blanche Glynne (1893–1946), actress
- Denise Goddard (1945–2023), artistic gymnast
- Judith Godwin (died 1746), correspondent
- Margaret Gordon (1880–1962), singer
- Julie Gore (born 1958), darts player
- Julie Gould (born 1989), swimmer
- Peggy Gould (born 1922), swimmer, diver
- Lauren Gowen (born 2004), lawn and indoor bowls player
- Iris Gower (1935–2010), the pen name of Iris Davies, novelist
- Hannah Grace (born 1993), singer
- Helen Grace (active since 2004), film director
- Lateysha Grace (born 1992), TV personality, businesswoman, model
- Hannah Grae, rock musician
- Ellen Grainger (born c. 1943), track and field athlete
- Esther Grainger (1912–1990), artist, teacher
- Alice Gray (born 1992), science writer
- Betty Gray (1920–2018), table tennis player
- Kathryn Gray (born 1973), poet
- Beatrice Green (1894–1927), Welsh labour activist, key figure in the 1926 United Kingdom general strike
- Josie Green (born 1993), footballer
- Kay Green (1927–1997), cricketer
- Michelle Green (born 1982), footballer
- Sarah Green (born 1982), businesswoman, Liberal Democrats politician
- Alex Greenfield (born 1990), cyclist
- Jeanne Greenland (1919–2001), swimmer
- Kathryn Greenslade (born 1998), swimmer
- Clare Greenwood (born 1958), cyclist
- Iola Gregory (1946–2017), actress
- Janice Gregory (born 1955), politician
- Sara Gregory (born 1986), actress
- Helen Griffin (1958–2018), actress, writer
- Elizabeth Griffith (1727–1793), writer
- Lillian Griffith (1877–1972), artist
- Mari Griffith (1940–2019), radio announcer, singer, presenter, producer, novelist
- Nia Griffith (born 1956), politician
- Alex Griffiths (born 2002), cricketer
- Alice Griffiths (born 2001), footballer
- Ann Griffiths (1776–1805), religious poet, hymn writer
- Dewi Griffiths (born 1931), television producer, radio host
- Gracie Griffiths (born 2006), athlete
- Gwenny Griffiths, artist
- Jemma Gwynne Griffiths (born 1975), singer, songwriter, record producer
- Lesley Griffiths (born 1960), politician
- Mared Griffiths (born 2007), footballer
- Pam Griffiths, lawn bowls player
- Rhian Griffiths (born 1980), darts player
- Siân Grigg, make-up artist
- Natasha Groves-Burke (born 1973), badminton player
- Doris Gubbins (died 1961), table tennis player
- Lady Charlotte Guest (1812–1895), aristocrat and translator
- Josepha Heath Gulston (1811–1859), novelist
- Amy Guy (born 1983), model
- Maureen Guy (1932–2015), mezzo-soprano singer
- Bethan Gwanas, pen name of Bethan Evans (born 1962), Welsh-language novelist, children's writer
- Elen Gwdman (fl. 1616), poet
- Gweirca ferch Owain (died 1290), noblewoman, granddaughter of Madog ap Gruffydd Maelor
- Gwen ferch Ellis (c. 1542 – 1594), he first person in Wales to be executed under the Witchcraft Act 1562
- Gwen Teirbron (fl. 5th or 6th century), holy woman, wife of Fragan
- Gwenafwy (fl. 6th century), pre-congregational saint of medieval South Wales
- Saint Gwenfyl (fl. 6th century), Christian saint
- Gwenllian ferch Gruffydd (1097–1137), Princess Consort of Deheubarth
- Gwenllian of Wales (1282–1337), daughter of Llywelyn ap Gruffudd
- Leisa Gwenllian (active since 2014), actress
- Siân Gwenllian, politician
- Gwenllwyfo, Christian saint
- Gwenog (fl. 7th century), saint
- Gwerful Fychan (fl. 1420–1490), Welsh-language poet
- Gwerful Mechain (fl. 1460–1502), poet
- Lisa Gwilym (born 1975), broadcaster
- Lowri Gwilym (1954–2010), television and radio producer
- Meinir Gwilym (born 1983), pop and folk singer
- Gwladys (died c. 500 or 523), daughter of King Brychan
- Gwladys ferch Dafydd (died c. 1336), daughter of Dafydd ap Gruffydd
- Gwladys ferch Dafydd Gam (died 1454), noblewoman
- Branwen Gwyn, presenter
- Eirwen Gwynn (1916–2007), nationalist, writer, teacher and scientist
- Denise Gyngell (born 1961), singer, actress, model

== H ==
- Jasmine Hacker-Jones (born 2000), judoka
- Mabel Hackney (1872–1914), actress
- Tessa Hadley (born 1956), author
- Ffion Hague (born 1968), broadcaster, author, former civil servant
- Cerys Hale (born 1993), rugby union player
- Holly Hale (born 1990), model
- Sara Hale (born 1982), netball player
- Alison Halford (1940–2025), senior police officer, politician
- Augusta Hall, Baroness Llanover (1802–1896), arts patron
- Claire-Marie Hall, actress
- Judith Elizabeth Hall, Professor of Anaesthetics, Intensive Care and Pain Medicine at Cardiff University
- Lydia Hall (bonr 1987), golfer
- Gemma Hallett (born 1981), rugby union player
- Lady Grizel Louise Hamilton (1880–1976), aristocrat
- Nina Hamnett (1890–1956), painter, writer
- Denise Hampson (born 1978), track cyclist
- Jessica Hand (born 1957), diplomat
- Margaret Hanmer (c. 1370 – c. 1420), wife of Owain Glyndŵr
- Natasha Harding (born 1989), footballer
- Doris Hare (1905–2000), actress, singer, comedian, dancer
- Esyllt Harker (1947–2014), singer, actress, storyteller
- Elin Harlow, squash player
- Gwennan Harries (born 1988), footballer
- Mags Harries (born 1945), sculptor, teacher
- Mali Harries (born 1976), actress
- Sian Harries, writer, actress
- Sioned Harries (born 1989), rugby union player, physical education teacher
- Carolyn Harris (born 1960), politician
- Medi Harris (born 2002), swimmer
- lizabeth Harris Aitken (1936–2022), socialite
- Marion Harrison (born 1946), wheelchair curler
- Darcey Harry (born 2003), golfer
- Edwina Hart (born 1957), politician
- Jordan Hart (born 1995), badminton player
- Kimberly Hart-Simpson (born 1987), actress, businesswoman
- Sue Harvard (1888–1967), operatic soprano
- Caroline Harvey (born 1991), badminton player
- Ann Hatton (1764–1838), novelist
- Hawys Gadarn (1291 – c. 1353), daughter of Owen de la Pole
- Amy Hawkins (1911–2021), supercentenarian, dancer
- Carys Hawkins (born 1988), association football player
- Jenny Hawkins (born 1990), rugby union player
- Janet Haworth (born 1949), politician
- Kamila Hawthorne, medical academic, general practitioner
- Jocelyn Hay (1927–2014), journalist, broadcasting campaigner, founder of the Voice of the Listener & Viewer
- Myfanwy Haycock (1913–1963), poet, artist, broadcaster
- Amy Beth Hayes (born 1982), actress
- Eloise Hayward (born 1999), rugby union and rugby league player
- Elizabeth Haywood, businesswoman, the first Welsh Woman of the Year
- Angela Hazeldine (born 1981), actress, musician
- Rebecca Hazlewood, actress
- Mali Hâf (born 1997), Welsh-language singer
- Sara Head (born 1980), table tennis player
- Venissa Head (born 1956), track and field athlete
- Anneliese Heard (born 1981), cyclist
- Deba Hekmat (born 2001), model, actress, writer
- Rhiannon Henry (born 1987), swimmer, paracyclist, paratriathlete
- Georgia Henshaw (born 1993), actress
- Ruth Herbert Lewis (1871–1946), temperance movement activist, collector of Welsh folk songs
- Abbie Hern (born 1997), actress
- Ruth van Heyningen (1917–2019), biochemist
- Liv Hill (born 2000), actress
- Deirdre Hine (born 1937), physician
- Tracey Hinton (born 1970), Paralympic athlete
- Georgina Hockenhull (born 1997), artistic gymnast
- Sally Hodge (born 1966), cyclist
- Jessica Hogg (born 1995), artistic gymnast
- Frances Hoggan (1843–1927), physician, first female doctor registered in Wales
- Demi Holborn, singer
- Karen Holford (born 1962), engineer and professor
- Ceri Holland (born 1997), footballer
- Sophie Holland (active since 2000s), actress
- Emily Hollinshead (born 1995), footballer
- Holly Holyoake (born 1988), classical music singer
- Alice Hooker-Stroud (born 1984), politician, climate activist
- Jocelyn Hooper (1943–2008), swimmer
- Cara Hope (born 1993), rugby union player
- Nichola Hope (born 1975), painter, writer, silhouettist
- Sarah Hope (born 1975), twin sister of Nichola, painter, writer, actress
- Mary Hopkin (born 1950), singer
- Catrin Hopkins (born 1997), singer, songwriter
- Pamela Hopkins (born 1953), gymnast
- Mererid Hopwood (born 1964), poet, lyricist, Archdruid of the National Eisteddfod of Wales
- Ciara Horne (born 1989), racing cyclist
- Grace Horrell (born 2001), footballer
- Sally El Hosaini (born 1976), film director, writer
- Ray Howard-Jones (1903–1996), Berkshire-born artist who lived in Penarth from an early age
- Daphne Howard-Williams (born 1942), track and field athlete
- Liz Howe (1959–2019), ecologist, herpetologist
- Sophie Howe (born c. 1977), the first Future Generations Commissioner for Wales
- Isabelle Howell (born 2000), field hockey player
- Katy Howell, badminton player
- Myfanwy Howell (1903–1988), broadcaster, host of Amser Te
- Val Howell (died 2021), lawn bowls player
- Gillian Howells (born 1944), swimmer
- Rae Howells, writer
- Sarah Howells, singer-songwriter
- Vikki Howells, politician
- Joan Howson (1885–1964), stained glass artist
- Elaine Hugh-Jones (1927–2021), pianist, music educator, composer
- Ann Harriet Hughes (1852–1910), Welsh-language novelist, poet
- Beryl Hughes (1931–2017), chess player, writer
- Cari Hughes (born 1999), distance and cross country runner
- Claire Hughes, Welsh Labour politician
- Elise Hughes (born 2001), footballer
- Ellen Hughes (1867–1927), Welsh-language writer, suffragist, temperance reformer
- Gainor Hughes (1745–1780), one of the fasting girls of the 18th century
- Jane Hughes (1811–1878), poet, hymnist
- Kath Hughes (born 1988), actress, writer, comedian
- Laura Hughes (born 2001), footballer
- Laura Hughes (born 1993), weightlifter
- Mary Hughes, lawn bowls player
- Megan Hughes (born 1977), cyclist
- Nerys Hughes (born 1941), actress, narrator
- Rosie Hughes, footballer
- Sali Hughes (born 1975), journalist, writer, broadcaster
- Siw Hughes (born 1958), actress
- Elspeth Hughes-Davies (1841–1911), teacher, linguist, campaigner for women's suffrage
- Annie Jane Hughes Griffiths (1873–1942), child of Robert J. Davies
- Angela Hui (born 1991), journalist, author
- Colette Hume, Education Correspondent for BBC Wales Today
- Beverley Humphreys (born 1947), operatic and concert soprano
- Elizabeth "Betsy" Humfrey, singer
- Christine Humphreys, politician
- Emma Humphreys (1967–1998), murdered her groomer and pimp
- Judith Humphreys (born 1988), actress
- Ann Mercy Hunt (1938–2014), medical researcher, campaigner
- Ruth Hunt, Baroness Hunt of Bethnal Green, administrator, Chief Executive of Stonewall
- Ellen Hunter (born 1968), cyclist
- Anna Hursey (born 2006), table tennis player
- Ruth Hussey, from 2012 to 2014: Chief Medical Officer for Wales
- Jane Hutt (born 1949), politician
- Joan Hutt (1913–1985), Hertfordshire-born painter who moved to live in North Wales in 1949
- Alis Huws (born 1995), harpist
- Bethan Huws (born 1961), multi-media artist
- Edrica Huws (1907–1999), textile artist
- Emily Huws (born 1942), Welsh-language children's writer
- Siân Pari Huws (1960–2015), journalist, broadcaster
- Dyddgu Hywel (born 1989), rugby union player

== I ==
- Sophie Ingle (born 1991), footballer
- Elisabeth Inglis-Jones (1900–1994), novelist
- Greta Isaac (born 1995), singer, songwriter
- Norah Isaac (1915–2003), Welsh-language short story writer, playwright, travel writer
- Ruqaya Izzidien, novelist, journalist

== J ==
- Katrina Jacks (c. 1986 – 2010), rower
- Ellie Jackson, reality television personality
- Sarah Jacob (1857–1869), one of the best-known of the fasting girls of the 19th century
- Amanda James (born 1960), swimmer
- Angharad James (1677–1749), poet and harpist
- Becky James (born 1991), cyclist
- Buddug Verona James, mezzo-soprano opera singer
- Irene James (born 1952), politician
- Jenny James (1927–2014), the first Welsh person to swim the English Channel
- Jynine James (born 1972), actress, singer
- Maria James (1793–1868), Welsh-born American poet
- Stephanie James (born 1985), actress
- Polly James (born 1986 or 1987), presenter
- Rachel James (born 1988), racing cyclist
- Siân James (born 1959), politician
- Tori James
- Angharad James-Turner (born 1994), footballer
- Eldra Jarman (1917–2000), harpist, author
- Kate Jarman (born 1980), actress
- Pauline Jarman (born 1945), politician
- Emma Jenkins (born 1992 or 1993), TV host, beauty pageant titleholder
- Eveline Annie Jenkins (1893–1976), botanical artist, illustrator
- Helen Jenkins (born 1984), triathlete
- Katherine Jenkins (born 1980), singer
- Kathryn Jenkins (1961–2009), scholar and writer of Welsh hymns
- Justina Jeffreys (1787–1869), gentlewoman
- Mary Jestyn Jeffreys (1908–1973), golfer
- Delyth Jewell (born 1988), politician
- Lisa Jên, actress, singer
- Ruth Jên (born 1964), painter, illustrator
- Joan, Lady of Wales (c. 1191 – 1237), wife of Llywelyn the Great
- Lois Joel (born 1999), footballer
- Angela V. John (born 1948), historian, biographer
- Gwen John (1876–1939), painter
- Margaret John (1926–2011), actress
- May John (1874–1962), soprano singer
- Natalia John (born 1996), rugby union player
- Pam John, lawn bowls player
- Rebecca John (born 1970), presenter, reporter
- Rebecca F. John (born 1986), novelist
- Rachel Johncock (born 1993), track and field athlete
- Manon Johnes (born 2000), rugby union player
- Mariamne Johnes (1784–1811), botanist
- Eleanor Johns (fl. 16th century), courtier of Elizabeth of York
- Glynis Johns (1923–2024), actress, pianist, singer
- Liz Johnson (born 1985), swimmer
- Nerys Johnson (1942–2001), artist, art curator
- Alex Jones (born 1977), television presenter
- Alice Gray Jones (1852–1943), writer, editor
- Ann Jones (born 1953), politician
- Bessie Jones (1887–1974), singer
- Beth Jones, comedian
- Beverley Jones (born 1974), Paralympian
- Bronwen Jones (born 1941), track and field athlete
- Carol Byrne Jones, teacher, lecturer, producer and poet
- Caroline Jones (1955–2026), politician
- Carrie Jones (born 2003), footballer
- Catrin Jones (born 1999), weightlifter
- Christine Jones (born 1955), artist, ceramicist
- Claire Jones (born 1985), harpist
- Della Jones (born 1946), singer
- Denise Idris Jones (1950–2020), politician
- Dora Herbert Jones (1890–1974), administrator and singer
- Duffy Jones (born 1984), singer, actress
- Einir Jones (born 1950), poet, adaptor of children's books
- Elin Jones (born 1966), politician
- Elisabeth Jones (born 1959 or 1960), lawyer
- Elizabeth Jane Louis Jones (1889–1952), scholar
- Ellen Jones (born 2002), footballer
- Emma Jones (born 1982), footballer
- Emma Jones (born 1994), footballer
- Emma Jones (born 1975), journalist
- Ezzelina Jones (1921–2012), artist, sculptor
- Fay Jones (born 1985), politician
- Frances Môn Jones (1919–2000), harpist and teacher
- Gwyneth Jones (born 1936), singer
- Hannah Jones (born 1996), rugby union player
- Harriet Jones (born 1997), swimmer
- Hayley Jones (born 1995), racing cyclist
- Helen Mary Jones (born 1960), Plaid Cymru politician
- Iona Jones (active since 1986), broadcaster, television executive
- Isabel Jones (born 1955), lawn bowls player
- Jackie Jones (born 1966), politician, barrister, academic
- Jade Jones (born 1993), taekwondo athlete, boxer
- Jessica Leigh Jones (born 1994), engineer, astrophysicist
- Kelsey Jones (born 1997), rugby union player
- Kirsty Jones, professional kitesurfer
- Laura Anne Jones (born 1979), politician
- Lili Jones (born 2005), footballer
- Louise Jones (born 1963), cyclist
- Lucie Jones (born 1991), singer, actress, model
- Mab Jones, poet, writer, radio presenter
- Mai Jones (1899–1960) songwriter, entertainer and radio producer
- Mair Jones, lawn and indoor bowls player
- Mandy Jones, former politician, farmer
- Margaret Jones (1918–2024), illustrator
- Margaret Jones (1842–1902), travel writer
- Mary Jones (1915–1990), actress
- Mary Lloyd Jones (born 1934), painter, printmaker
- Mary Oliver Jones (1858–1893), novelist
- Mary Vaughan Jones (1918–1983), children's writer, teacher
- Nesdi Jones (born 1992), singer-songwriter
- Nesta Wyn Jones (1946–2025), poet, writer
- Nia Jones (born 1992), footballer, netballer
- Rita Jones, lawn and indoor bowls player
- Ruth Jones (born 1966), actress, writer
- Ruth Jones (born 1962), Labour Party politician
- Sally Jones (born c. 1938), track and field athlete
- Sarah Jones (born 1990), field hockey player
- Shirley Jones (born 1934), writer, poet, printmaker
- Susan Elan Jones (born 1968), politician
- Tammy Jones (born 1944), singer
- Sue Jones-Davies (born 1949), actress, singer, mayor
- Rosemary Joshua (born 1964), soprano
- Alisha Joyce-Butchers (born 1997), rugby union player
- Jasmine Joyce-Butchers (born 1995), rugby union player

== K ==
- Kadiatu Kanneh-Mason (born 1965 or 1966), memoirist, arts administrator
- Anna Kashfi (1934–2015), actress
- Katheryn of Berain (1535–1591), noblewoman
- Catrin Kean, writer
- Courtney Keight (born 1997), rugby union player
- Katell Keineg (born 1965), singer-songwriter
- Mary Keir (1912–2024), supercentenarian
- Elaine Kellett-Bowman (1923–2014), politician
- Molly Kelly (born 2000), rugby union player
- Soffia Kelly (born 2007), footballer
- Patricia Kern (1927–2015), mezzo-soprano, voice teacher
- Hannah Keryakoplis (born 1994), footballer
- Keyne (fl. 5th century), holy woman, hermitess
- Gwyneth Keyworth (born 1990), actress
- Nyree Kindred (born 1980), swimmer
- Amy King (born 1995), racing cyclist
- Eluned King (born 2002), cyclist
- Hilary King (1931–2024), bowls player
- Jemma L. King, poet
- Shirley King, lawn bowls player
- Phyllis Kinney (1922–2026), singer, collector, historian
- Glenys Kinnock (1944–2023), politician, teacher
- Christine Kinsey (born 1942), painter, author, curator
- Emma Kirby (born 1988), producer, vocalist, DJ
- Jade Knight (born 1989), rugby union player
- June Knox-Mawer (1930–2006), writer
- Helgard Krause (born 1970), publishing executive
- Angela Kwok (died 2016), community champion for the Chinese community in Cardiff

== L ==
- Margaret Lacey (1911–1988), actress, ballet teacher
- Eddie Ladd (born 1964), TV presenter, dancer
- Hayley Ladd (born 1993), footballer
- Eloise Laity (born 1994), field hockey player
- Kerin Lake (born 1990), rugby union player
- Nikita Lalwani, novelist
- Kate Lamb (born 1988), actress
- Kate Lambert (active since 2000s), model, fashion designer
- Gwenllian Lansdown (born 1979), politician
- Sarah Lark (born 1983), singer, actress
- Muriel Lavender Wilson (1933–2018), arts administrator, curator, jewellery historian
- Trish Law (born 1954), politician
- Holly Lawrence (born 1990), triathlete
- Jackie Lawrence (born 1948), politician
- Nadia Lawrence (born 1989), footballer
- Sonia Lawrence (born 1980), gymnast, pole vaulter
- Lisa Lazarus (born 1987 or 1988), model, actress
- Cate Le Bon (born 1983), singer-songwriter
- Janet Le Mare (born 1942), swimmer
- Caroline Lear, geologist, professor
- Alison Leatherbarrow, footballer
- Helen Lederer (born 1954), comedian, writer, actress
- Nancy Lee (born 1970), Welsh-born short story writer, novelist, now in Canada
- Ellie Leek (born 1995), footballer
- Janet Lees Price (1943–2012), actress
- Gaynor Legall (born 1950), campaigner, activist
- Shân Legge-Bourke (1943–2025), landowner, second Lord Lieutenant of Powys
- Tiggy Legge-Bourke (born 1965), former nanny and companion to Prince William and Prince Harry
- Meg Leonard, screenwriter, producer, director
- Hawise Lestrange (died 1310), daughter of the Marcher lord John Lestrange
- Ela Letton-Jones, para swimmer
- Ruby Levick (1871–1940), sculptor
- Evelyn Anna Lewes (c. 1873 – 1961), author, translator
- Bethan Lewis (born 1999), rugby union player
- Bronwen Lewis (born 1994), singer, songwriter, radio presenter
- Caitlin Lewis (born 1999), rugby union player
- Caryl Lewis (born 1978), novelist
- Curigwen Lewis (1905–1992), actress
- Donna Lewis (born 1973), singer, musician
- Eiluned Lewis (1900–1979), novelist, poet, journalist
- Gwyneth Lewis (born 1959), Welsh-language poet, national poet of Wales, also writes in English
- Gwyneth Lewis (born 1938), track and field athlete
- Harriet Lewis (1911–1999), teacher, actress
- Natalie Lewis (born 1982), middle distance runner
- Nicola Lewis (born 1977), netball player
- Rose Mabel Lewis (1853–1928), writer, suffragist
- Sarah Lianne Lewis (born 1988), composer
- Sheila Lewis (born c. 1936), track and field athlete
- Gwynedd Lewis-Lingard (born 1934), gymnast
- Emmeline Lewis Lloyd (1827–1913), mountaineer
- Thyrza Anne Leyshon (1892–1996), artist
- Ellinore Lightbody (born 1959), tennis coach and player
- Hana Lili, singer-songwriter
- Princess Lilian, Duchess of Halland (1915–2013), fashion model, Swedish princess
- Siwan Lillicrap (born 1987), rugby union player
- Gweneth Lilly (1920–2004), writer, teacher
- Doris Lindner (1896–1979), sculptor
- Danielle Lineker (born 1979), actress, model
- Phyllis Linton (1929–2023), swimmer
- Saint Llechid (fl. 6th century), pre-congregational saint of Wales
- Rebecca Llewellyn (born 1985), tennis player
- Haf Llewelyn (born 1964), author, teacher
- Carys Lloyd (born 2006), cyclist
- Ella Lloyd (born 2005), racing driver
- Hannah Lloyd (born 1979), cricketer
- Jo Lloyd, writer
- Manon Lloyd (born 1996), presenter, road and track cyclist
- Margaret Lloyd (1709–1762), Moravian missionary
- Mary Lloyd (1819–1896), sculptor
- Sarah J. Lloyd (born 1896), artist
- Sian Lloyd (born 1968), news presenter
- Siân Lloyd (born 1958), weather presenter
- Val Lloyd (born 1943), politician
- Annie Lloyd Evans (1873–1938), educator, principal, scholar
- Margaret Lloyd George (1864–1941), humanitarian, magistrate
- Megan Lloyd George (1902–1966), politician, the first female Member of Parliament
- Mary Lloyd Jones (born 1934), painter
- Muriel Lloyd Prichard (1905–1991), academic, economist, writer
- Mari Lloyd-Williams, medical consultant
- Angharad Llwyd (1780–1866), antiquary
- Betsan Llwyd, actress, Arts Director of Bara Caws since 2012
- Eirian Llwyd (1951–2014), artist
- Martha Llwyd (1766–1845), poet, hymnist
- Robyn Lock (born 1993), rugby union player
- Ali Loke (born 1993), squash player
- Josie Longhurst (born 2002), footballer
- Sarah Loosemore (born 1971), tennis player
- Jemma Lowe (born 1990), swimmer
- Breanne Loucks (born 1987), golfer
- Mari Lövgreen (born 1983), TV presenter
- Jayne Ludlow (born 1979), footballer, football coach
- Enid Luff (1935–2022), musician, music educator, composer
- Frances Lynch, archaeologist
- Catherine Lynch (1880–1908), petty criminal, prostitute
- Eleri Lynn (born 1977), curator, historian
- Marian Lyons (1923–2017), the first woman to lead a county council in the United Kingdom
- Tori Lyons, actress
- Zoe Lyons (born 1971), comedian, TV presenter

== M ==
- Mabyn, medieval Cornish saint, child of King Brychan
- Georgia Mackenzie (born 1973), actress
- Helen Mackay (1897–1973), sculptor
- Polly Louise Mackey, musician, producer, singer-songwriter
- Sophie Mackintosh (born 1988), novelist, short story writer
- Margaret Mackworth, 2nd Viscountess Rhondda (1883–1958), businesswoman and suffragette
- Ella Maclean-Howell (born 2004), cyclist
- Ruth Madoc (1943–2022), actress, singer
- Sharon Maguire (born 1960), film director
- Catrin Mai-Huw (born 1987), voice actress
- Angharad Mair (born 1960), TV presenter
- Tegwen Malik (born 1975), squash player
- Kerrie Manley (born 1982), footballer
- Ruth Manning-Sanders (1886–1988), poet, children's writer
- Sarah Mansbridge, lawn bowls player
- Edith Mansell-Moullin (1859–1941), suffragist
- Deborah Manship (born 1953), actress
- Rosalind March (active since 1979), actress
- Marged ferch Ifan (1696–1793), harpist, wrestler
- Jodie Marie (born 1991), singer-songwriter
- Jacqueline Marling, member of the Kidwelly sex cult
- Judith Maro (1919–2011), writer
- Carys Marsh (born 1997), rugby league footballer
- Natasha Marsh (born 1975), soprano
- Eva Marshal (1203–1246), noblewoman
- Kiera Marshall (born 1998), Plaid Cymru politician
- Martha'r Mynydd (fl. c. 1770), known for having convinced many neighbours of the existence of 'The Invisibles'
- Ruth Martin-Jones (born 1947), long jumper, heptathlete
- Ayshea Martyn, footballer
- Angharad Mason (born 1979), racing cyclist, sports injury specialist, chartered physiotherapist, acupuncturist
- Edith Ellen Henrietta Massey (1863–1946), artist, botanist
- Gwenddolen Elizabeth Evileen Massey (1864–1960), artist, botanist
- Ursula Masson (1945–2008), educator, literature researcher, non-fiction writer
- Saint Materiana (born c. 440), Welsh saint
- Olivia Mathias (born 1998), professional triathlete
- Cerys Matthews (born 1969), singer, songwriter, broadcaster, writer
- Donna Matthews (born 1971), musician
- Lily Matthews, racing cyclist
- Tegwen Matthews (born 1955), golfer
- Ruth May, nurse
- Jo Mazelis (born 1956), writer
- Laura McAllister (born 1964), footballer, academic, sports administrator
- Mary McAteer, footballer
- Kylie McCarthy (born 1987), footballer
- Grace McCleen (born 1981), novelist
- Kate McGill (born 1990), singer-songwriter
- Tess McHugh (born 2002), sprinter
- Edwina McGrail (born 1950), artist, poet
- Cory McKenna (born 1999), mixed martial artist
- Jenny McLoughlin (born 1991), Paralympian track and field athlete
- Anna McMorrin (born 1971), politician
- Gwerful Mechain (c.1460–1502), early Welsh-language poet
- Llinos Medi (born c. 1981), Plaid Cymru politician
- Nia Medi, Welsh-language novelist, actress
- Leila Megàne (1891–1960), opera singer
- Melangell (fl. 7th or 8th century), hermit, abbess
- Meleri (fl. 5th century), Welsh saint, Queen of Ceredigion
- Sophie Melville (born 1991), actress
- Menefrida (fl. 5th century) Cornish saint, child of the Welsh king Brychan
- Daloni Metcalfe (born 1968), presenter
- Nel Metcalfe (born 2004), rugby union player
- Maisie Methuen (born 2001), artistic gymnast
- Sandy Mewies (born 1950), politician
- Safia Middleton-Patel (born 2004), footballer
- Dorothy Miles (1931–1993), poet, wrote in English and sign language
- Gill Miles (born 1941), lawn and indoor bowls player
- Hannah Miles (born 1998), footballer
- Helen Miles (born 1967), sprinter
- Valerie Miles (1914–1999), artist, illustrator
- Shelly Millar, member of the Kidwelly sex cult
- Ruby Miller (born 1992), cyclist
- Veronica Milligan (1926–1989), electrical engineer, president of the Women's Engineering Society
- Eleri Mills (born 1955), painter
- Hannah Mills (born 1988), sailor
- Tracey Moberly (born 1964), multidisciplinary artist
- Christina Modestou (born 1989), actress, singer
- Moelona, pen name of Elizabeth Mary Jones (1877–1953), Welsh-language novelist, children's writer, translator
- Helen Molyneux, lawyer, CEO of NewLaw Solicitors
- Madeleine Moon (born 1950), politician
- Mica Moore (born 1992), bobsleigher, sprinter
- Sally Moore (born 1962), painter
- Lauren Morais (born 2000 or 2001), actress
- Ann Moray (1909–1981), novelist, short story writer, singer
- Jessica Morden (born 1968), politician
- Margaret More (1903–1966), composer
- Anne Morgan, Baroness Hunsdon (c. 1529 – 1607), English official
- Becky Morgan (born 1974), golfer
- Betty Morgan (born 1942), lawn and indoor bowls player
- Chloe-Beth Morgan (born 1986), model
- Diana Morgan (1908–1996), playwright, screenwriter
- Elaine Morgan (1920–2013), playwright, non-fiction writer
- Elaine Morgan (born 1960), singer
- Elena Puw Morgan (1900–1973), Welsh-language novelist, children's writer
- Eleri Morgan, actress, comedian
- Elizabeth Morgan (born 1930), actress, writer
- Eluned Morgan (born 1967), politician, former First Minister of Wales
- Eluned Morgan (1870–1938), Welsh-language author from Patagonia, travel writer, non-fiction writer
- Enid Morgan, lawn and indoor bowls player
- Esther Morgan (born 2002), footballer
- Ffion Morgan (born 2000), footballer
- Gladys Morgan (1898–1983), comedian
- Gwenllian Morgan (1852–1939), the first woman in Wales to hold the office of Mayor
- Gwenllian Elizabeth Fanny Morgan (1852–1939), mayor, antiquarian
- Helen Morgan (1966–2020), field hockey player
- Helen Elizabeth Morgan (born 1952), model, actress, TV hostess
- Julie Morgan (born 1944) Welsh Labour politician
- Kate Alicia Morgan (born 1983), model, actress
- Kelly Morgan (born 1975), badminton player
- Lowri Morgan (born 1975), television presenter, adventurer, ultra marathon runner
- Mali Morgan (born 2006), artistic gymnast
- Margo Morgan (1929–2001), gymnast
- Mary Morgan (1788–1805), servant in Presteigne, killed her newborn child
- Sharon Morgan (born 1949), actress
- Kay Morley-Brown (born 1963), athlete
- Anna Morris (born 1995), track cyclist
- Beth Morris (1943–2018), actress
- Lilith Salvia Morris (born 2000), drag artist, musician, performance artist, designer, FX artist
- Mali Morris (born 1945), artist
- Mary Morris (1873–1925), medical doctor, suffragist
- Sharon Morris, poet, senior lecturer at the Slade School of Fine Art
- Sian Morris (born 1965), sprinter
- Siwan Morris (born 1976), actress
- Tracey Morris (born 1967), long-distance runner
- Diana Morrison (born 1969), actress
- Sheila Morrow (born 1947), president of Great Britain Hockey, field hockey player
- Penelope Mortimer (1918–1999), journalist, biographer, novelist
- Morwenna (fl. 6th century), patron saint of Morwenstow
- Betsan Moses (born 1971), CEO of National Eisteddfod of Wales
- Margaret Mostyn (1625–1679), English Discalced Carmelite, prioress of the Lierre Carmel
- Sophie Moulds (born 1992), model
- Katherine Mudge (1881–1975), archer
- Joanne Muggeridge (born 1969), badminton player
- Wendy Mulford (born 1941), poet, feminist
- Annie Mullin (1847–1921), suffragist, social worker, Liberal councillor
- Valerie Mullins (born 1935), gymnast
- Catherine Murphy (born 1975), athlete
- Sarah Murphy (born 1986), Welsh Labour and Co-Operative Party politician
- Tesni Murphy (born 1992), squash player
- Eve Myles (born 1978), actress

== N ==
- Jill Nalder (born 1961), theatre actress, HIV/AIDS activist
- Leila Navabi (born 1998), comedian, writer
- Lynne Neagle (born 1968), politician
- Clara Neal (c. 1870–1936), teacher, school headmistress, suffragette leader in Wales
- Liz Neal (born 1973), artist based in London
- Mary Edith Nepean (1876–1960), writer
- Jennifer Nesbitt (born 1995), long-distance runner
- Nest ferch Cadell (fl. 9th century), the daughter of Cadell ap Brochfael
- Sibyl de Neufmarché (c. 1100 – after 1143), Countess of Hereford, suo jure Lady of Brecknock
- Lisa Neumann (born 1993), rugby union player
- Bethan Nia, singer, harpist
- Claire Nicholas (born 1986), cricketer
- Jemima Nicholas (1755–1832), heroine during the 1797 Battle of Fishguard
- Lilian Nicholas (born 1909), lawn and indoor bowls player
- Liz Nicholl (born 1952), sports administrator, netball player
- Sara Nicholls (born 1989), lawn and indoor bowls player
- Mavis Nicholson (1930–2022), writer, broadcaster
- Phillida Nicholson (1924–2021), artist, Land Girl
- Adele Nicoll (born 1996), shot put and discus thrower, bobsledder
- Ninnoc (c. 414 – 467), abbess
- Kimberley Nixon (born 1985), actress
- Rhian Nokes (born 1989), footballer, rugby player
- Kylie Nolan (born 1998), footballer
- Saint Non (c. 5th–6th century), saint, mother of Saint David
- Elli Norkett (1996–2017), rugby union player
- Trudy Norris-Grey, businesswoman
- Louisa Nott-Bower (1861–1925), archer
- Marie Novello (1884–1928), pianist
- Tegan Nox (born 1994), professional wrestler
- Rungano Nyoni, director, screenwriter, actress

== O ==
- Pixie O'Harris (1903–1991), Welsh-born Australian artist, poet, autobiographer, illustrator
- Azuka Oforka (born 1981), actress, writer
- Jenny Ogwen, actress, presenter
- Stella Oliver, lawn bowls player
- Mary Thomas O'Neal (1887 – after 1974), labor activist
- Gail Osborne (born c. 1971), badminton player
- Joan Osborne, lawn and indoor bowls player
- Tessie O'Shea (1913–1995), stand-up comedian, actress
- Laura O'Sullivan (born 1991), footballer
- Rhian O'Sullivan (born 1981), darts player
- Angharad ferch Owain (1065–1162), queen of Gwynedd
- Heledd Owen, musician
- Judith Owen (born 1969), singer-songwriter
- Leah Owen (1953–2024), singer, conductor, music coach
- Lucy Owen (born 1971), television news reader
- Mary Owen (1796–1875), hymnwriter
- Meg Wynn Owen (1939–2022), actress
- Morfydd Llwyn Owen (1891–1918), composer, pianist and singer
- Rachel Owen (1968–2016), photographer, printmaker, lecturer on medieval Italian literature
- Siobhán Owen (born 1993), soprano, harpist
- Kelly Lee Owens (born 1988), electronic musician and producer
- Joan Oxland (1920–2009), artist, teacher

== P ==
- Nellie Evans Packard, singer, voice teacher, arranger, choir director
- Lucy Packer (born 2000), rugby union player
- Suzanne Packer (born 1962), actress
- Kelly Packwood (born 1986), lawn and indoor bowls player
- Kerry Packwood (born 1986), lawn and indoor bowls player
- Joanna Page (born 1977), actress
- Lisa Palfrey (born 1967), actress
- Davinia Palmer (born 1980), television presenter, voice-over artist, now in the United States
- Lauren Parfitt (born 1994), cricketer
- Emma Parker (fl. 1809–1817), novelist
- Linda Parker (1925–2018), lawn and indoor bowls player
- Stephanie Parker (1987–2009), actress
- Fanny Parkes (1794–1875), travel writer
- Molly Parkin (born 1932), painter, novelist, journalist
- Edith Parnell (1913–1938), swimmer, journalist
- Annette Bryn Parri (1962–2025), pianist
- Eirlys Parri (c. 1950–2024), teacher, singer, actress
- Eluned Parrott, politician
- Blanche Parry (1507 or 1508 – 1590), personal attendant of Queen Elizabeth I
- Carys Parry (born 1981), hammer thrower
- Lisa Parry, playwright
- Sarah Winifred Parry (1870–1953), writer
- Caryl Parry Jones (born 1958), singer, songwriter, actress, composer
- Amy Parry-Williams (1910–1988), singer, writer
- Liz Parsons (1945–2020), track and field athlete
- Sharla Passariello (born 1992), footballer
- Rhianon Passmore, politician
- Nikesha Patel, actress
- Karen Paullada (active since 2000s), actress
- Fen Paw (born 1966), engineer, rugby union player, county badminton player
- Abigail Pawlett (born 2003), multi-event athlete
- Sarah Payne, probation executive
- Sally Peake (born 1986), track and field athlete
- Kathy Pearce (born 1963), lawn and indoor bowls player
- Allison Pearson (born 1960), journalist, writer
- Kerry Peers (born 1964), actress
- Mary Pendrill Llewelyn (1811–1874), poet, translator
- Emily Penn, skipper, ocean-advocate
- Jessie Penn-Lewis (1861–1927), evangelist, religious writer, magazine publisher
- Anne Penny (1729–1784), poet
- Mary Penry (1735–1804), Moravian sister in Pennsylvania
- Natasha Perdue (born 1975), weightlifter
- Victoria Perkins (born 2004), professional boxer
- Pat Perks (born 1940), gymnast
- Kelly-Louise Pesticcio (born 1974), beauty pageant winner
- Alexis Peterman, actress
- Pauline Peters (born 1895–1976), actress
- Lisa Peters, curler
- Pascale Petit (born 1953), poet
- Kusha Petts (1921–2003), artist, writer
- Emily Jane Pfeiffer (1827–1890), poet, philanthropist
- Katherine Philips (1632–1664), poet, translator
- Bethan Phillips (1934–2019), author, screenwriter
- Carys Phillips (born 1992), rugby union player
- Dorothea Phillips (born 1928), actress
- Glenda Phillips (born 1945), swimmer
- Jemima Phillips, harpist
- Lauren Phillips (born 1981), actress
- Mary Elizabeth Phillips (1875–1956), medical doctor
- Rebeca Phillips, Plaid Cymru politician
- Siân Phillips (born 1933), actress
- Rachael Phipps (born 1974), badminton player
- Cherry Pickles (born 1920), artist, lecturer
- Jayne Pierson (active since 2009), fashion designer
- Cassia Pike (born 2000), footballer
- Eleanor Pilgrim (born 1977), golfer
- Kya Placide (born 2004), bobsledder, sprinter
- Emma Plewa (born 1990), footballer
- Victoria Plucknett (born 1953), actress
- Margaret Pomeroy, lawn and indoor bowls player
- Annie Powell (1906–1986), politician
- Ella Powell (born 2000), footballer
- Kayleigh Powell (born 1999), rugby union player
- Natalie Powell (1990), judoka
- Shona Powell-Hughes (born 1991), rugby union player
- Lisa Power (born 1954), sexual health and LGBT rights campaigner
- Betsan Powys (born 1965), journalist, former Editor of Programmes for BBC Radio Cymru
- Angharad Price, novelist since 1999, academic
- Dilys Price (1932–2020), educator and parachutist
- Janet Price (born 1938), soprano
- Jo Price (born 1985), rugby union player, footballer
- Karen Price (1966 – c. 1981), murder victim
- Lauren Price (born 1994), boxer, kickboxer, footballer
- Margaret Price (1941–2011), soprano
- Wendy Price (born 1972), lawn bowls player
- Fanny Price-Gwynne (1816–1901), novelist, artist, composer, poet and philanthropist
- Charlotte Price White (1873–1932), leading member of the North Wales Suffragist movement, councillor
- Maria Pride (born 1970), actress
- Christine Pritchard (1943–2023), actress
- Ursula Pritchard, netball player
- Kiri Pritchard-McLean (born 1986), comedian, writer
- Margaret Pritchard, broadcaster
- Helen Prothero-Lewis (1853–1946), writer
- Myfanwy Pryce (1890–1976), novelist
- Eleri Pryse, emeritus Professor of Physics
- Rhian Pugh (born 1989), gymnast
- Sheenagh Pugh (born 1950), poet, novelist, translator
- Mared Pugh Evans, harpist
- Buddig Anwylini Pughe (1857–1939), artist
- Marion Purcell, lawn and indoor bowls player
- Gwenllian Pyrs (born 1997), rugby union player

== Q ==
- Mary Quant (born 1934), fashion designer
- Samantha Quayle (born 1995), footballer
- Leanne Quigley, winner of The Traitors series 3

== R ==
- Allen Raine, pen name of Anne Adalisa Beynon Puddicombe (1836–1908), novelist, wrote in English and Welsh
- Kate Ralph (1849–1937), composer, pianist
- Jenny Randerson, Baroness Randerson (1948–2025), politician
- Valerie Randle (born 1953), materials engineer, Welsh Woman of the Year in 1998
- Elizabeth Randles (c. 1801 – 1829), harpist and pianist
- Susannah Jane Rankin (1897–1989), minister, educator, translator
- Jenny Rathbone (born 1950), politician
- Helen Raynor (born 1972), television screenwriter, script editor, playwright
- Cara Readle (born 1991), actress
- Rachel Redford (born 1990 or 1991), actress
- Beth Reekles (born 1995), author
- Anne Ceridwen Rees (1874–1905), physician
- Angharad Rees (1944–2012), actress
- Christina Rees (born 1954), politician
- Dorothy Rees (1898–1987), Labour Party politician
- Eileen Rees (1912–2008), nurse, nurse educationalist
- Eleri Rees (born 1953), judge
- F. Gwendolen Rees (1906–1994), zoologist, parasitologist, first Welsh woman to become a fellow of the Royal Society
- Sarah Rees, politician
- Sarah Jane Rees (1839–1916), teacher, poet, temperance campaigner
- Shelley Rees (active since 1990s), actress
- Yvette Rees (1924–1993), actress
- Deryn Rees-Jones, since 1994, poet, essayist
- Sian Reese-Williams (born 1981), actress
- Emma Reeves, screenwriter, playwright
- Jackie Reynolds (1920–2021), fencer
- Nicola Reynolds (born 1972), actress
- Francesca Rhydderch (born 1969), novelist, academic
- Beti Rhys (1907–2003), bookseller, author
- Elen Rhys (active since 2011), actress
- Myvanwy Rhys (1874–1945), suffragist, historian
- Nest ferch Rhys (c. 1085 – c. 1136), princess of Deheubarth
- Shani Rhys James (born 1953), Australia-born painter, moved to Wales after graduation
- Rosie Ribbons, singer-songwriter
- Anneka Rice (born 1958), presenter, journalist, painter
- Rachel Rice (born 1984), actress, model, reality television star
- Mandy Rice-Davies (1944–2014), model, showgirl, writer, actress
- Hannah Rich (born 1991), racing cyclist
- Aileen Richards, businesswoman, the first woman to join the board of the Welsh Rugby Union
- Ceri Richards (1903–1971), painter
- Erin Richards (born 1983), actress, director, writer
- Menna Richards, Controller of BBC Cymru Wales
- Nansi Richards (1888–1979), harpist
- Phoebe Richards (born 1993), field hockey player
- Rosalind Richards (active since 2000s), actress
- Louise Rickard (born 1970), rugby union player
- Joan Ricketts, lawn bowls player
- Alexandria Riley, actress, documentarian
- Amelia Ritchie (born 1999), footballer
- Alexandra Roach (born 1987), actress
- Beth Robert (active since 1986), actress
- Abi Roberts (born 1970), political commentator
- Amy Roberts (born 1994), racing cyclist
- Bethan Roberts (born 2003), footballer
- Eigra Lewis Roberts (1939–2026), author
- Eirlys Roberts (1911–2008), consumer advocate, campaigner, co-founder of the Consumers' Association
- Jessica Roberts (born 1999), cyclist
- Julie Roberts (born 1963), painter
- Kate Roberts (1891–1985), leading Welsh-language novelist, short story writer
- Lesley Roberts (born c. 1958), badminton player
- Lleucu Roberts (born 1964), author
- Lowri Roberts (born 1997), squash player
- Lynette Roberts (1909–1995), poet, novelist
- Melanie Roberts (born 1988), gymnast
- Nia Roberts (born 1972), actress
- Nia Roberts, presenter
- Pat Roberts (1921–2013), golfer
- Rachel Roberts (1927–1980), actress
- Rhiannon Roberts (born 1990), footballer
- Sally Roberts Jones (born 1935), poet, biographer
- Claire Robertson (table tennis) (1975–2017), para table tennis player
- Eden Robinson (born 2006), multi-event athlete
- Elen Roger Jones (1908–1999), actress, teacher
- Jude Rogers (born 1978), journalist, lecturer, arts critic, broadcaster
- Julie Rogers (born 1998), Paralympian volleyball player
- Laura Rogers (born 1979), actress
- Philippa Roles (1978–2017), discus thrower
- Angel Romaeo (born 1997), artistic gymnast
- Abigail Roper (born 2005), artistic gymnast
- Emily Roper, artistic gymnast
- Manon Steffan Ros (born 1983), novelist, writer, games author, musician
- Donna Rose (born 1991), rugby union player
- Rachel Rowe (born 1992), footballer
- Gemma Rowland (born 1989), rugby union player
- Ceinwen Rowlands (1905–1983), soprano
- Jane Helen Rowlands (1891–1955), scholar, missionary
- Bernice Rubens (1923–2004), novelist, author of The Elected Member
- Berta Ruck (1878–1978), writer
- Joan Ruddock (born 1943), politician
- Rosalind Rusbridge (1915–2004), teacher, peace campaigner
- Selina Rushbrook (1880–1907), petty criminal, prostitute, brothel keeper
- Bethan Russ, lawn bowls player
- Georgia Ruth (born 1988), singer-songwriter, harpist
- Janet Ryder (born 1955), politician

== S ==
- Deon Saffery (born 1988), squash player
- Antoinette Sandbach (born 1969), barrister, farm manager, politician
- Banita Sandhu (born 1997)
- Rhian Samuel (born 1944), composer
- Amanda Sater, Baroness Sater (born 1963), marketing executive, magistrate
- Gwenno Mererid Saunders (born 1981), musician
- Liz Saville Roberts (born 1964), Plaid Cymru politician
- Bethan Sayed (borm 1981), politician
- Joanna Scanlan (born 1961), actress, writer
- Annabel Schofield (1963–2026), model, actress, producer
- Aleighcia Scott, singer-songwriter, radio presenter
- Molly Scott Cato (born 1963), politician, economist
- Lisa Scott-Lee (born 1975), singer
- Michelle Scutt (born 1960), Olympic athlete
- Helen Sear (born 1955), photographic artist
- Senana ferch Caradog (c. 1198 – 1263), wife of Gruffudd ap Llywelyn Fawr
- Carole Seymour-Jones (1943–2015), writer
- Kate Serjeantson (died 1918), actress
- Sevira, daughter of Roman Emperor Magnus Maximus
- Cynthia Shaddick (born 1944), swimmer
- Rosie Sheehy, actress
- Caroline Sheen (born 1976), actress
- Kerry Ann Sheppard (born 1984), badminton player
- Katie Sherwood (born 1986), footballer
- Nina Shipperlee (born 1936), lawn bowls player
- Norena Shopland, historian, writer
- Sallyanne Short (born 1968), sprinter
- Sarah Siddons (1755–1831), actress
- Barbara Sidney, Countess of Leicester (1563–1621), heiress, first wife of Robert Sidney, 1st Earl of Leicester
- Amber Simpson (born 1999), hammer thrower
- Dorothy Simpson (1933–2020), mystery novelist, crime-fiction writer
- Jane Simpson (born 1965), artist
- Jess Sims (born 1990), lawn and indoor bowls player
- Karen Sinclair (born 1952), politician
- Hollie Singer, musician
- Caroline Skeel (1872–1951), historian
- Violet Skies, singer-songwriter
- Claire Skinner (born 1997), footballer
- Zoë Skoulding, poet
- Sylvia Sleigh (1916–2010), Welsh-born American painter
- Seren Smale (born 2004), cricketer
- Sophia Smale (born 2004), cricketer
- Carmen Smith, Baroness Smith of Llanfaes (born 1996), politician
- Dorothea Eliza Smith (1804–1864), botanical artist
- Eryl Smith (c. 1893–1930), doctor, botanist, plant collector
- Hannah Smith (born 1986), lawn and indoor bowls player
- Florence Smithson (1884–1936), actress, singer
- Elinor Snowsill (born 1989), rugby union player
- Rachael Solomon (born 1974), singer, choreographer, television producer
- Anoma Sooriyaarachchi (born 1981), track and field athlete
- Poppy Soper (born 2002), footballer
- Louisa M. Spooner (1820–1886), novelist
- Dorothy Squires (1915–1998), singer
- Danielle St James (born 1992), model, entrepreneur, campaigner
- Non Stanford (born 1989), triathlete
- Jane Stanness, actress, writer, singer-songwriter
- Emma Stansfield (born 1978), actress
- Alison Statton (born 1958), singer
- Louise Steel, Professor of Near Eastern Archaeology at the University of Wales Trinity St David
- Mary Steele (1678–1718), second wife of Sir Richard Steele
- Irene Steer (1889–1947), swimmer
- Anna Stembridge (born 1981), netball player
- Jaci Stephen (born 1958), journalist, broadcaster, actress, writer
- Elan Closs Stephens (born 1948), academic, non-executive director of the BBC Board, Chair of the BBC
- Jo Stevens (born 1966), politician
- Nicky Stevens (born 1949), singer
- Catrin Stewart (born 1988), actress
- Keelyn Stewart (born 2007), footballer
- Taegan Stewart (born 2007), footballer
- Poppy-Grace Stickler (born 2006), artistic gymnast
- Julie Stockden (born c. 1945), badminton player
- Emily Stone (born 1989), author
- Frances Stone (born 2009), artistic gymnast
- Hannah Stone (born 1987), harpist
- Louisa Stoney (born 2002), sprinter
- Mari Strachan (born 1945), novelist, librarian
- Annie Morgan Suganami (born 1952), artist, musician
- Sara Sugarman (born 1962), actress, film director
- Jessica Sula (born 1994), actress
- Jennifer Sullivan (born 1945), children's writer, critic
- Dorothy Summers (born 1941), gymnast
- Hilary Summers, contralto
- Ann Sutherland, lawn and indoor bowls player
- Rosie Swale-Pope (born 1946), marathon runner, non-fiction writer
- Kay Swinburne, Baroness Swinburne (born 1967), politician, life peer
- Alia Syed (born 1964), Swansea-born artist and filmmaker, now living and working in London

== T ==
- Tako Taal, filmmaker, programmer
- Shav Taj (born 1976), trade unionist, politician
- Emily Charlotte Talbot (1840–1918), heiress, industrialist
- Olive Talbot (1842–1894), aristocrat
- Myfanwy Talog (1944–1995), actress
- Tathana (fl. 5th century), saint of South Wales
- Adi Taviner (born 1990), rugby union player
- Kathy Tayler (born 1960), TV presenter
- Caroline Taylor (born 1973), lawn and indoor bowls player
- Jemima Taylor (born 2009), artistic gymnast
- Rachel Taylor (born 1983), rugby union player
- Jess Taylor-Roberts (born 1994), rugby union player
- Tegau Eurfron (Early Christian era), wife of King Caradoc Vreichvras
- Niamh Terry (born 2000), rugby union player
- Tetha (fl. 5th century), virgin and saint in Wales
- Anita Thapar, child psychiatrist
- Raer Theaker (born 1997), artistic gymnast
- Mary Gladys Thoday (1884–1943), botanist, suffragist, peace activist
- Alys Thomas (born 1990), swimmmer
- Anna Thomas, comedian
- Carol Thomas (born c. 1942), track and field athlete
- Carolyn Thomas (born 1965), Welsh Labour and Co-operative politician
- Caryl Thomas (born 1986), rugby union player
- Catherine Margretta Thomas (born 1880), Welsh folk dancer
- Catrin Thomas (born 1964), ski mountaineer, mountain climber
- Elin Manahan Thomas, soprano
- Emily Thomas (born 2001), artistic gymnast
- Ena Thomas (1935–2020), TV chef
- Florence Thomas (1879–1957), ophthalmic surgeon, first woman to join the medical staff at Swansea Hospital
- Gwenda Thomas (born 1942), politician
- Helen Thomas (1966–1989), peace activist
- Imogen Thomas (born 1982), model
- Jade Thomas (born 1982), footballer
- Jean Thomas (born 1942), biochemist
- Jo Thomas (born 1972), composer, sound artist, producer, performer of electronic music
- Julie Thomas (born 1967), lawn bowls player
- Kathrin Thomas (1944–2023), Lord Lieutenant of Mid Glamorgan
- Louie Myfanwy Thomas (1908–1968), novelist
- Lowri Thomas (born 1999), track cyclist
- Lucy Thomas (1781–1847), businesswoman
- Lynda Thomas (born 1981), musician, singer-songwriter
- Lynne Thomas (born 1939), cricketer
- Madoline Thomas (1890–1989), actress
- Margaret Thomas (1779–?), hymnwriter
- Mary Thomas (1787–1875), diarist, poet
- Mary Thomas (1932–1997), soprano
- Melanie Thomas, lawn bowls player
- Queenie Thomas (1898–1977), film actress
- Rachel Thomas (1905–1995), actress
- Rose Thomas (born 1992), field hockey player
- Sarah Thomas (born 1992), badminton player
- Sarah Thomas (1788–1897), centenarian
- Sarah Thomas (born 1981), field hockey player
- Siân Thomas (born 1953), actress
- Vicki Thomas (born 1954), golfer
- Seren Thorne (born 2003), sports shooter
- Victoria Thornley (born 1987), rower
- Ceryl Tindall-Jones (born 1980), footballer
- Linda Tomos(born 1952), librarian
- Hester Thrale (1740 or 1741 – 1821), diarist
- Margaret Tisdale (1950–2015), clinical virologist
- Lily Tobias (1887–1984), novelist, short story writer, activist
- Angela Tooby (born 1960), athlete, runner
- Susan Tooby (born 1960), athlete, runner
- Jacqueline Townsend (born 1939), swimmer
- Lauren Townsend (born 1990), footballer
- Jennifer Toye (1933–2022), operatic soprano
- Abbie Trayler-Smith, documentary and portrait photographer
- Catherine Tregenna (active since 2000s), playwright, scriptwriter, actress
- Rebecca Trehearn, actress
- Marie Trevelyan (1853–1922), writer, folklorist
- Ethel Trew (1869–1948), headmistress
- Rachel Trezise (born 1978), author
- Barbara Margaret Trimble (1921–1995), novelist
- Sisilia Tuipulotu (born 2003), rugby union player
- Hayley Tullett (born 1973), athlete, runner
- Beryl Turner (born 1941), track and field athlete
- Carissa Turner (born 1989), badminton player
- Chloé Tutton (born 1996), swimmer
- Agnes Twiston Hughes (1895–1981), solicitor, mayor of Conwy
- Saint Tydfil (c. 480), the legendary dedicatee of Merthyr Tydfil
- Bonnie Tyler (1951–2026), singer
- Lowri Tynan (born 1987), swimmer

== U ==
- Meena Upadhyaya (active since 2000s), medical geneticist

== V ==
- Ada Vachell (1866–1923), worker for people with disabilities
- Eleanor Vachell (1879–1948), botanist
- Elizabeth Vaughan (born 1937), soprano
- Erin Vaughan (born 1986), football coach, footballer
- Hilda Vaughan (1892–1985), novelist, short story writer, playwright, author of The Invader
- Leona Vaughan (born 1995), actress
- Ursula Venables (1913–2000), zoologist
- Pamela Motley Verrall (1915–1996), composer, music educator
- Lisa Victoria (born 1973), actress
- Peyton Vincze (born 2000), footballer
- Carol Vorderman (born 1960), broadcaster, media personality, writer
- Vulcana (1874–1946), strongwoman

== W ==
- Kirsty Wade (born 1962), athlete, runner
- Sally Wade (born 1984), footballer
- Helen Wadsworth (born 1964), golfer
- Emma Walford (born 1974), actress, singer, broadcaster
- Laura May Walkley (born 1991), footballer
- Lucy Walter (c. 1630 – 1658), mistress of Charles I
- Georgia Walters (born 1993), footballer
- Melanie Walters (born 1962), actress
- Jo Walton (born 1964), Welsh-Canadian romance and science fiction novelist, author of Tooth and Claw
- Helen Ward (born 1986), footballer
- Anna Laetitia Waring (1823–1910), poet, hymnist
- Myfanwy Waring (born 1977), actress
- Heather Warner (born 1993), racewalker
- Mary Wynne Warner (1932–1998), mathematician
- Elizabeth Andrew Warren (1786–1864), botanist and marine algolologist
- Judith Wason, lawn bowls player
- Sarah Waters (born 1966), novelist, author of Fingersmith
- Elizabeth Watkin-Jones (1887–1966), children's author
- Kat Watkins, Welsh disability activist
- Joyce Watson (born 1955), politician
- Julia Watson (born 1953), actress
- Helen Watts (1927–2009), contralto
- Megan Watts Hughes (1842–1907), singer, songwriter, scientist
- Joanna Weale (born 1975), lawn and indoor bowls player
- Megan Webb (born 2001), rugby union player
- Honeysuckle Weeks (born 1979), actress
- Perdita Weeks (born 1985), actress
- Lauren Wells (born 1988), footballer
- Meri Wells (born 1946), ceramic sculptor
- Alis Wen (born c. 1520), Welsh-language poet
- Saint Wenna (died c. 492 AD), medieval princess and Christian martyr who flourished in Wales and Cornwall
- Sarah Wesley (1726–1822), wife of Charles Wesley
- Helen Weston, netball player
- Judy Wheeler (born 1944), herbarium botanist
- Olive Wheeler (1886–1963), educationist, psychologist and university lecturer
- Eirene White, Baroness White (1909–1999), politician
- Ethel Lina White (1876–1944), crime writer
- Lynette White (1967–1988), murder victim
- Mary White (1926–2013), ceramicist, calligrapher
- Wendy White (1940–2016), netball player, coach, umpire, administrator and author
- Ysie White (born 1993), lawn bowls player
- Jean Whitehead (born 1934), track and field athlete
- Emily Whitlock (born 1994), squash player
- Elisabeth Whittle, garden historian
- Susan Wightman (born 1960), long-distance runner
- Debbie Wilcox, Baroness Wilcox of Newport (born 1957), politician, Member of the House of Lords
- Susie Wild (born 1979), novelist, journalist, editor, strong connections with Wales
- Robyn Wilkins (born 1995), rugby union player
- Caroline, Lady Wilkinson (1822–1881), botanist, author
- Leah Wilkinson (born 1986), field hockey player
- Helen Willetts (born 1972), meteorologist
- Alis Mallt Williams (1867–1950), political writer, celtophile
- Alys Williams (born 1987), singer
- Amy Williams (born 1993), indoor bowls player
- Anna Williams (1706–1783), poet
- Annie Williams (born 1942), still life watercolour painter who grew up in Wales
- Averil Williams (1935–2019), athlete
- Beryl Williams (1937–2004), actress
- Betty Williams, (born 1944), politician
- Buddug Williams (1932–2021), actress
- Buffy Williams (born 1976), politician
- Chloe Williams (born 2000), footballer
- Chloe Williams (born 1995), golfer
- Claire Williams (born 1987), paralympian athlete
- Dinah Williams (1911–2009), organic farmer
- Elin Williams, influencer, blogger
- Florence Williams (born 1994), rugby union player
- Frances Williams (1904–1978), composer, conductor
- Frances Williams (c. 1760 – 1801),convict who was an early settler of Australia and Norfolk Island
- Grace Williams (1906–1977), composer
- Holly Williams,arts and features writer, theatre critic
- Iris Williams (1946–2025), singer
- Jane Williams (1806–1885), biographer, non-fiction works, many about Wales
- Joan Williams (1922–2002), artist, printmaker, teacher
- Kate Williams (born 2000), rugby union player
- Kathleen Mary Williams (1919–1974), literary scholar
- Katie Williams (born 1984), footballer
- Kirsty Williams (born 1971), politician
- Lauren Williams (born 1999), taekwondo athlete
- Lucy Gwendolen Williams (1870–1955), sculptor, painter
- Mared Williams, singer-songwriter
- Margaret Lindsay Williams (1888–1960), portrait painter
- Margaretta Williams (1933–2018), academic, lexicographer, Celtic linguist, translator, Breton scholar
- Maria Jane Williams (1795–1873), musician, folklorist
- Mary Williams (1883–1977), academic of modern languages, first woman appointed to a professorial title at a British university
- Olwen Williams, Consultant Physician in Genitourinary/HIV, Welsh Woman of the Year in 2000
- Sarah Williams (born 1961), badminton player
- Sian Williams (born 1964), journalist, current affairs presenter, and counselling psychologist
- Sian Williams (born 1968), footballer
- Sian Williams (born 1990), rugby union player
- Sioned Williams (born 1971), politician
- Stephanie Williams (born 1992), footballer
- Sue Williams (born 1956), visual artist
- Wendy Williams (1942–2012), cricketer
- Catherine Williamson (born 1982), cyclist
- Jenny Willott (born 1974), politician
- Patricia Wiltshire (born 1942), forensic ecologist, botanist, palynologist
- Sarah Wiltshire (born 1991), footballer
- Saint Winifred (fl. 7th century), saint
- Beth Winter (born 1974), politician
- Bethan Witcomb (active since 2010), actress
- Katy Wix (born 1980), actress, comedian, writer, artist
- Sarah Wixey (born 1970), sport shooter
- Leanne Wood (born 1971), politician
- Mary Myfanwy Wood (1882–1967), missionary
- Emma Woodcock (born 1976), lawn and indoor bowls player
- Eluned Woodford-Williams (1913–1984), geriatrician
- Lily Woodham (born 2000), footballer
- Andrea Worrall (born 1977), footballer
- Margaret Wright (1854–1933), known for her rescue of crewmen from the Mumbles lifeboat
- Nancy Wright (1917–1994), golfer
- Frances Elizabeth Wynne (1835–1907), painter, sketcher
- Megan Wynne (born 1993), footballer
- Sarah Edith Wynne (1842–1897), operatic soprano, singer

== X ==
- Mimi Xu (born 2007), tennis player

== Y ==
- Paula Yates (1959–2000), television presenter, non-fiction writer
- Megan York (born 1987), rugby union player

== Z ==
- Catherine Zeta-Jones (born 1969), actress
