= Mary Owen =

Mary Owen may refer to:

- Mary Owen (hymnwriter) (1796–1875), Welsh hymnwriter
- Mary Owen (activist) (1921–2017), Australian feminist and activist
- Mary Alicia Owen (1850–1935), Missouri folklore collector
- Mary Jane Owen (1929–2019), American disability rights activist
