= Jessie Ace and Margaret Wright =

Welsh sisters who rescued seamen in distress

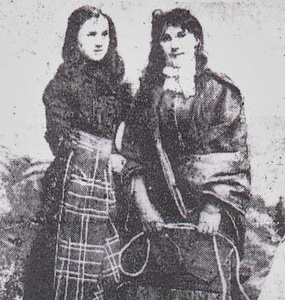
Jessie Ace and Margaret Wright

Jessie Ace (1860 – after 1883) and Margaret Wright (née Ace; 1854–1933) are known for their rescue of crewmen from the Mumbles lifeboat, which had gone to assist a wrecked German barque during an 1883 storm at Mumbles Head, Wales.

== Lifeboat rescue ==
Ace and Wright were daughters of the Mumbles Lighthouse keeper Abraham Ace.

On 27 January 1883, an 885-ton German barque named Admiral Prinz Adalbert of Danzig was caught in a storm in Mumbles Head and wrecked just below the lighthouse. The Mumbles lifeboat came to rescue the crew. When the Mumbles lifeboat, a wooden sailboat named the Wolverhampton, got into trouble Wright and Ace waded into the surf to rescue the lifeboat crew. They tied their shawls together to use as a rope and rescued two of the lifeboat crewmen who had fallen overboard.

It is reported that Wright cried: "I will lose my life than let these men drown" as she waded into the icy waters. While some claimed the story was apocryphal, their father confirmed the actions of his daughters, alongside those of Gunner Edward Hutchings, in rescuing two crew members from the ship during the inquest into the disaster. Four of the Wolverhampton crew died that night, leaving four widows and fourteen orphaned children. The same storm also wrecked two other ships (Agnes Jack and James Grey) on the Gower Peninsula, claiming 44 lives.

== Recognition ==
While the Royal National Lifeboat Institution awarded a silver medal and £50 to the coxswain who had aided the women in the rescue, and issued a commendation on vellum to Hutchings, it did not officially recognize the sisters' role.

The sisters did receive gold brooches from Augusta of Saxe-Weimar-Eisenach, the Empress of Germany, for caring for the barque's crew. The women gained international fame when they were featured on the front page illustration of The Graphic in February 1883.

== Legacy ==
Clement Scott wrote a poem, The Women of Mumbles Head, in tribute to their heroic actions.

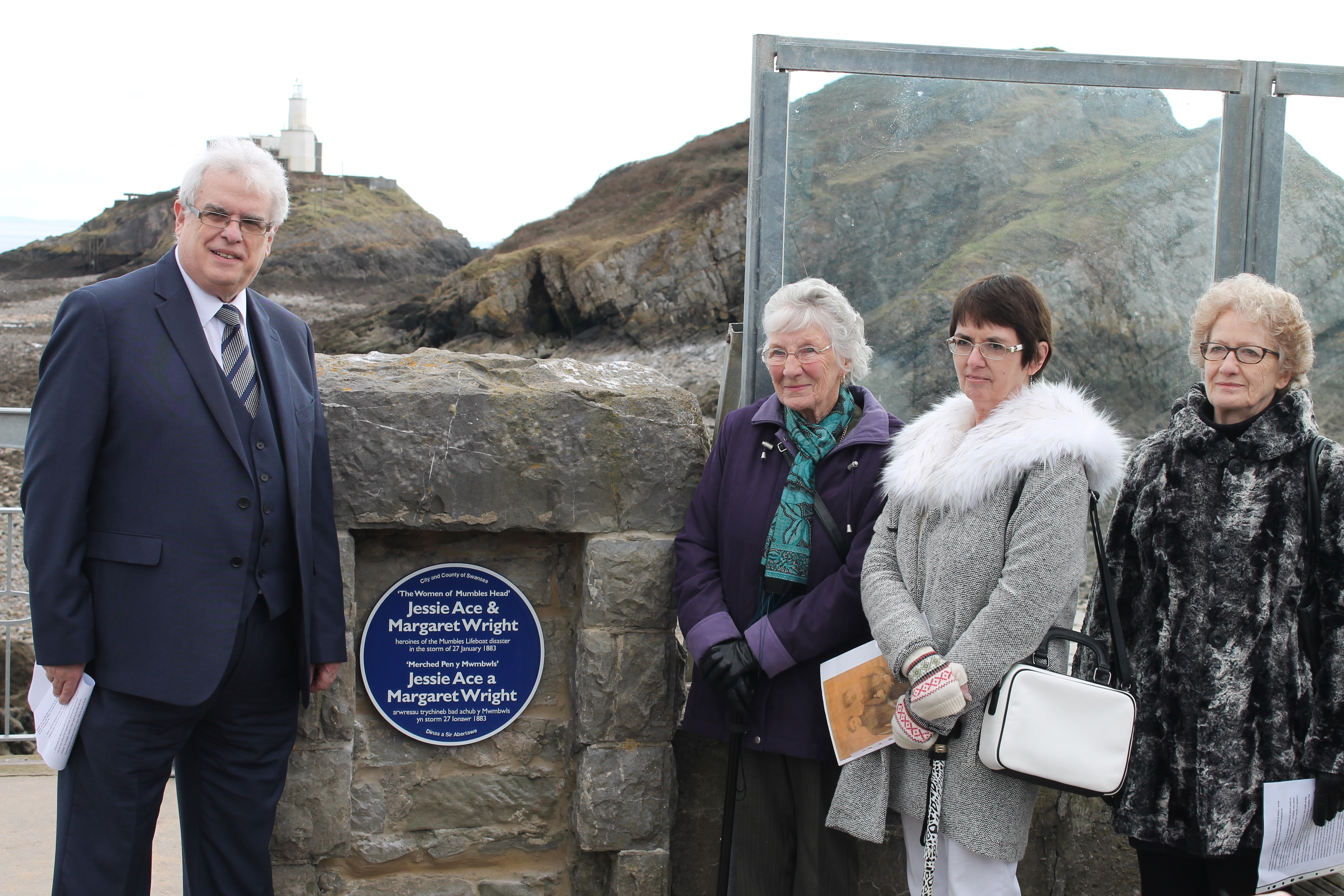
Unveiling of the Blue Plaque to 'The Women of Mumbles Head'

In 2016, a blue plaque was erected by Mumbles Pier to commemorate their bravery.

== Later years ==
In 1885, Jessie Ace married John Dunstan at St. Mary's, Swansea; the two emigrated to Australia in 1889. The couple divorced in 1901. She died in 1936 in New South Wales, where she was buried.
