= Margaret Tisdale =

Welsh clinical virologist

Margaret Tisdale (née Breeze; 10 September 1950 – 29 April 2015) was a Welsh-born clinical virologist known for her studies of antiviral resistance in HIV and influenza virus, and for coordinating the development of the anti-influenza drug zanamivir.

== Biography ==
Born in Welshpool, Tisdale was educated at Trefnanney School and Welshpool Comprehensive, before attending Guildford University.

Tisdale spent 33 years as a researcher at the Wellcome Research Laboratories, GlaxoWellcome and GlaxoSmithKline, where she eventually became head of clinical virology. She was an expert in HIV drug resistance and in optimising antiretroviral therapy. Tisdale headed the development of the influenza neuraminidase inhibitor zanamivir, which Glaxo licensed from Biota in 1990. She established the global Neuraminidase Inhibitor Susceptibility Network in 1999 to track resistance to neuraminidase inhibitors in clinical strains of influenza virus. She also published on antiviral drugs against rhinovirus, which causes the common cold.

She died aged 64 in Wrestlingworth, Bedfordshire.

== Selected publications ==
- M Tisdale, SD Kemp, NR Parry, BA Larder (1993). Rapid in vitro selection of human immunodeficiency virus type 1 resistant to 3'-thiacytidine inhibitors due to a mutation in the YMDD region of reverse transcriptase. Proceedings of the National Academy of Sciences of the United States of America 90: 5653–56
- M Tisdale, T Alnadaf, D Cousens (1997). Combination of mutations in human immunodeficiency virus type 1 reverse transcriptase required for resistance to the carbocyclic nucleoside 1592U89. Antimicrobial Agents and Chemotherapy 41: 1094–98
- M Tisdale (2000). Monitoring of viral susceptibility: new challenges with the development of influenza NA inhibitors. Reviews in Medical Virology 10: 45–55
