= Ursula Venables =

Welsh zoologlist (1913–2000)

Ursula Mary Venables
- Born: 17 August 1913; Hawarden, Wales
- Died: 3 February 2000 (aged 86); Angelsey
- Other name: Ursula Mary Wykes
- Education: Lady Margaret Hall, Oxford
- Occupations: zoologist ornithologist writer
- Spouse: Llewellyn Sidney Vaughan Venables

Ursula Mary Venables (nee Wykes, 1913–2000) was a Welsh zoologist who spent eight years in Shetland documenting the wildlife and traditions of the islands with her husband, ornithologist Llewellyn Sidney Vaughan Venables (known as "Pat," 1903–1989).

== Biography ==
Ursula Mary Wykes was born on 17 August 1913 at Hawarden, Wales, to parents George Herbert Wykes and Sarah Ellen Stephenson Wykes. Ursula's father had died by 1921 and she resided for a period in Hawarden with her Aunt and Uncle. Ursula's mother Sarah was active in the National Union of Woman Teachers.

Ursula Wykes attended Lady Margaret Hall college at Oxford, where she was accorded a First Class honours degree in Natural Sciences (Zoology). Wykes was awarded the Naples Biological Scholarship for 1935–1936, and in the summer of 1935 joined the Oxford University Women's Iceland Expedition. While in Iceland about 70 miles from Reykjavik in Thrastalundur, Sogsbru, Wykes and fellow zoologist Patricia Lupton collected field mice to make a study of their ectoparasites (this study was conducted at the suggestion of Charles Sutherland Elton).

In 1939, still at Oxford, Wykes was working as a natural sciences teacher specialising in zoology. In July 1939 an engagement was announced between Wykes and John Trevor Archdal Pearce (1916–2000) of Keble College, however a marriage did not take place. John Pearce became a colonial administrator and married later in life.

Wykes first met ornithologist Llewellyn "Pat" Venables at Oxford around the outbreak of WW2, when they were working on a research job together. They married in 1945 and as a married couple moved to Whiteness, Shetland where they lived for about eight years. In this period Ursula wrote three books, one with Llewellyn, about the islands, particularly concerning the bird life, bird breeding patterns, and day to day business of living in Shetland.

Ursula and Llewellyn later moved to Anglesey, Wales where in 1965 Llewellyn played a brief role trying to assist with the responsible disposal of the ornithological collections of collector Vivian Hewitt (1888–1965). In 1974 Ursula and Llewellyn were visited at Anglesey by their friend Campbell Douglas Deane, who caught up with the couple and observed how the bird life on the island had changed since he was stationed there in 1944 during WW2.

Llewellyn Venables died in 1989. Ursula Mary Venables died at Angelsey on 3 February 2000.

== Select publications ==
- 1938: (as Ursula Wykes, with Patricia Lupton): The Field Mice of Iceland: Journal of Animal Ecology: Volume 7: number 1 (May 1938): pp. 22–26
- 1948: (with Llewellyn Venables): A Shetland Bird Population: Kergord Plantations: Journal of Animal Ecology: Volume 17: number 1 (May 1948): pp. 66–74
- 1948: The Rigs of Noss: The Countryman: Volume 38: number 2: pp. 225–228.
- 1951: Bird Watching at Midnight: The Countryman: Volume 43: number 2: pp. 296–300.
- 1952: Tempestuous Eden: The Story of a Naturalist in the Shetland Islands: The Museum Press, London.
- 1955: (with Llewellyn Venables): Birds and Mammals of Shetland: Oliver and Boyd, London.
- 1956: Life in Shetland, a World Apart: Oliver and Boyd, Edinburgh.
