= Jean Earle =

Poet

Jean Earle (1909–2002) was a British poet known for her prolific work during the last two decades of her life.

Earle was born in Bristol but brought up in the Rhondda Valley in South Wales and lived as an adult in Carmarthenshire, saying in an interview that in spite of her birthplace she felt more Welsh than English. Her first collection of poems A Trial of Strength (1980) was published when she was already in her seventies, but she went on to publish five more volumes of poetry before her death at the age of 93, including The Bed of Memory, which the Arts Council of Wales shortlisted for its Wales Book of the Year award in 2002.

Her private papers deposited in the National Library of Wales also indicate that she wrote a novel which was unpublished

== Reception ==
Critics responded in particular to Earle's focus on the theme of light and her adoption of a deliberately naïve stance which she saw as “a way to truth”. Visiting Light (1987) was a Poetry Book Society choice and Selected Poems (1990) a Poetry Book Society recommendation.

A reading and analysis of the poem 'Jugged Hare' appears on the Swansea University website.

== Works ==
- The Intent Look (1984)
- Visiting Light (1987)
- Selected Poems -with some new poems (1990)
- The Sun in the West (1995)
- The Bed of Memory (2001)
