= Meri Wells =

Welsh ceramic sculptor

Meri Wells (born 1946) is a ceramic sculptor who lives and works near Machynlleth, Powys, Wales.

== Education ==
Meri Wells studied Art at Sutton & Epsom School of Art, followed by Art and Drama at the University of Wales, Aberystwyth.

== Work ==
Using both raku and wood-firing techniques, Wells produces figurative sculptures, which are "part human, part animal, part bird." She sometimes digs the clay out of the local ground herself. She describes her creatures as having "come out of the hedge that I can see from the window. They march past reviving forgotten imagery of childhood stories and our cultural myths."

She is a member of the International Academy of Ceramics and the Royal Cambrian Academy. Her work forms part of the public collections at the National Museum of Wales and Newport Museum and Art Gallery.
