= Cherry Pickles =

Welsh artist

Cherry Pickles (born 1950) is an artist and lecturer from Bridgend in South Wales. Her works have been exhibited widely in the United Kingdom as well as in Greece and the United States. She has also lectured at a number of art schools.

== Biography ==
Pickles first obtained a degree in Mathematics from Ulster University before going on to study for a Postgraduate Diploma at Slade School of Fine Art, and a BA in Painting at Chelsea School of Art.

Pickles has had a career as an independent artist, exhibiting widely and securing a number of grants in order to travel, exhibit and publish her work. She won a Boise Travelling Scholarship to Italy in 1980 and Greek Government Scholarships in 1992, 1994 and 1995. As well as numerous group exhibitions Pickles has had several solo shows, including two in 1994, one at St David's Hall in Cardiff and the other at the Smith Jariwala Gallery. In 2017 she was shortlisted for the Lynn Painter-Stainers Prize. She mainly paints but also makes images with collage, drawing and camera. Some of her works, such as her self-portrait as Dylan Thomas, are portraits although she has also painted many landscapes.

Pickles has also had a long career as a lecturer and academic, teaching at a number of art schools including Falmouth School of Art, the University of St Andrews, Cardiff Art School and the Royal Drawing School in London.

In 2002 Pickles was the victim of theft, when her car along with 20 of her paintings were stolen in Cardiff. She was taking the paintings to Athens for an exhibition.

In the 2019 UK General Election Pickles hosted the constituency office, in Prime Minister Boris Johnson's London constituency, for the candidacy of William Tobin- aimed at highlighting the several million people excluded from the British electoral franchise. Pickles' paintings were used as campaign backdrops, notably Self-portrait as an Old Etonian for the campaign video.
