= Eleri Pryse =

Welsh physics professor

Professor Eleri Pryse
- Occupation: Professor of Phyics
- Awards: Fellowship of Learned Society of Wales (2018)

Academic background
- Education: Ysgol Gyfun Gymunedol Penweddig; University of Wales

Eleri Pryse is an emeritus Professor of Physics from Aberystwyth, Wales, and was elected as a fellow of the Learned Society of Wales in 2018.

== Education ==
Pryse is a former pupil of Ysgol Gyfun Gymunedol Penweddig. She went on to obtain a first-class degree in physics from the University of Wales and a PhD in Ionospheric Physics for an investigation of small-scale irregularities in the ionosphere using radio signals from satellites.

== Career ==
Pryse was appointed as a professor of physics at Aberystwyth University in 1989. In 2018, she was elected as a fellow of the Learned Society of Wales.

In March 2025, Pryse became an honorary fellow of the Coleg Cymraeg Cenedlaethol for her academic advancement and contribution to the teaching of Physics through the medium of Welsh.

Pryse both chaired and judged Eisteddfod 2025: Three Minute Thesis Competition alongside Dr Aled Eirug in August 2025.
