= Sarah J. Lloyd =

Welsh artist (born 1896)

Sarah J. Lloyd (born 1896) was a Welsh artist known for her landscape paintings.

== Biography ==
Lloyd was born at Laugharne in Carmarthenshire in west Wales and lived in the area throughout her life, with the local landscape being the regular subject of her paintings. Lloyd was largely self-taught as an artist although she did study sewing and fabric work part-time at the Carmarthen College of Art for a period. She mostly exhibited her paintings in Women's Institute, WI, exhibitions both regionally in Carmarthenshire and Pembrokeshire but also nationally, winning a WI Gold Medal on at least one occasion. Her work also featured in the 1972 Welsh Arts Council touring exhibition, An Alternative Tradition.
