= Rosalind Rusbridge =

Welsh teacher and peace campaigner

Rosalind Rusbridge (née Bevan, 15 April 1915 – 9 July 2004) was a teacher and a peace campaigner. She was known for her peace activism in Swansea, where she lost her job over her pacifism. Her account is told in the Swansea Conchie Controversy (1988). Later, she moved to Bristol, where she continued her activism. She also continued to teach until she was nearly 70 and worked in the church. She continued to campaign for human rights until her death.

== Biography ==
The daughter of Sidney Bevan DCM (1878–1935) and Emily Sarah Bevan (née Hemming, 1878–1974), Rosalind grew up in Swansea and was educated at Swansea High School for Girls. Her family were Baptists. As a teenager, Rosalind, who defined herself as a socialist and Christian-pacifist before even leaving the school, was influenced by the Reverend Howard Ingli James, a pacifist minister at Pantygwydr Baptist Church (1923–31). Thanks to a state scholarship, she studied at Cambridge University, where she achieved a first class in classics in 1938. She then went on taking a DipEd with distinction at Oxford University.

Rusbrige returned to Swansea in September 1939 to start as classics mistress at Glanmor Girls' School, where she became more and more involved in the peace movement. Before World War II, she formed a pacifist group, did public speaking about pacifism and also sold Peace News from a rented stall at the Swansea market. She also was one of the first women to become a member of the Peace Pledge Union (PPU).

After the Allies started having trouble with the war, a strong anti-pacifist sentiment rose up in Swansea and other areas of the country. Her stall at the Swansea market was threatened with "a nasty incident," and later, the council closed and locked her stall so she could not access it.

In June 1940 Swansea Council resolved to suspend employees who were pacifists or who opposed the war. Employees were asked to sign a Declaration of Allegiance in support of war. Rusbridge refused to sign, and she was left without a job. Later, the council rescinded the suspension, but Rusbridge was already teaching at Chester Boys' Grammar School, and refused to come back to Swansea.

She met her husband, Ewart Rusbridge, in Chester and they married in 1942. In 1948 they moved to Bristol. She continued to teach, most often at Clifton High School for Girls, and worked until she was nearly 70. She continued to be active in human rights and peace activism. She was a representative for the southwest at the national body of the Christian Campaign for Nuclear Disarmament (CCND), protested at United States bases at Aldermaston and Greenham Common, was active in the Baptist church and once ran in a Parliamentary election. She died of cancer in 2004 and was remembered at Horfield Baptist Church in Bristol before her body was cremated.

Her memories of the Swansea anti-pacifist campaign were recorded in the Swansea Conchie Controversy (1988) and in Parachutes and Petticoats (1992).
