= Gwenan Gibbard =

Welsh harpist (born 1978)

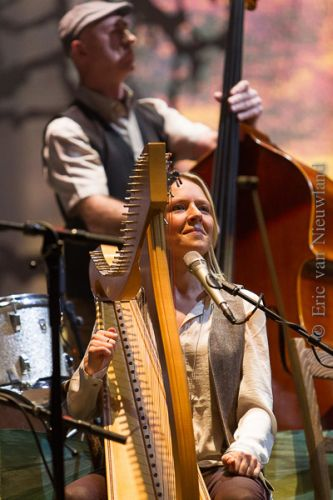
- Gibbard in October 2013
- Born: Gwenan Mair Gibbard; May 1978; Pwllheli, Gwynedd, Wales
- Education: Bangor University; Royal Academy of Music
- Occupations: Musician, writer

Gwenan Gibbard is a Welsh musician, singer, and a Welsh traditional music performer. She is a music graduate of the Bangor University with a master's degree there in performance and research in the field of Welsh music, and a graduate of the Royal Academy of Music.

== Biography ==
Gibbard was born in the Pwllheli area of the Gwynedd county. She was a winner in the main harp and singing competitions of the National Eisteddfod music festival, Yr Ywyl Gerdd Dant and the Celtic Pan Festival in Ireland, and represented Wales in festivals such as the Festival Interceltique de Lorient in Brittany, the World Harp Congress in Dublin, the Edinburgh International Harp Festival, Celtic Connections in Glasgow, and the North American Welsh Festival in Cincinnati.

Gibbard released two CDs under the Sain record label named Y Gwenith Gwynnaf and Sidan Glas.
