= Seren Gibson =

British former glamour model (born 1988)

- Born: 16 January 1988 (age 38); Ruthin, Denbighshire, Wales
- Occupation: Glamour model
- Height: 5 ft 6 in (1.68 m)

Seren Gibson (born 16 January 1988) is a British former glamour model. She has appeared topless and nude in photo spreads for several men's magazines and on Page 3 of the UK newspaper Daily Star. She featured in the British TV series My Crazy Media Life.

== Biography ==
Gibson enrolled in media studies at Goldsmiths College, University of London. Tuition and clothing expenditures sent her into debt, however, which proved to be the catalyst for her modelling career.

In 2007, Channel Four documented Gibson's day-to-day activities as an aspiring model in an episode of the children's educational documentary TV series My Crazy Media Life. The programme showed her living with her parents and younger brother in rural North Wales, and revealed that she is known as "Hâf" (pronounced "Harv") to her friends and family. "Seren Hâf" is Welsh for "Summer Star".

Gibson's Myspace blog is called Accidental Glamour Model, in which she explains why she turned to modelling.

By the end of 2007, Gibson had been featured in the Daily Star tabloid newspaper as a Page 3 girl; and in the lads' magazines Maxim and Zoo Weekly. As of 2013, she had appeared on the cover of Front six times (December 2007, May 2008, March 2009, January 2010, June 2010 and October 2012). She also appeared in adverts for Front inside the magazine in Autumn 2012.

In 2012 she starred in the music video for the Hadouken! song "Bad Signal", released on 5 August that year.
