= List of shipwrecks in 1883 =

The list of shipwrecks in 1883 includes ships sunk, foundered, grounded, or otherwise lost during 1883.

table of contents
1883
Jan	Feb	Mar	Apr
May	Jun	Jul	Aug
Sep	Oct	Nov	Dec
Unknown date

== Unknown date ==
List of shipwrecks: Unknown date in 1883
Ship	State	Description
Agnes	New South Wales	The ketch foundered in Jervis Bay.
Don Leandro	Flag unknown	The schooner was wrecked.
Fanny	United Kingdom	The ship was wrecked off Barry, Glamorgan.
Her Royal Highness	United Kingdom	The ship was wrecked at Cape San Antonio, Argentina after 8 January. Her crew were rescued.
Magnet	United Kingdom	The brigantine sprang a leak and was abandoned at sea. Her nine crew took to a boat; they were rescued 105 days later. She was on a voyage from Liverpool, Lancashire to Valparaíso, Chile.
Mona	(United Kingdom of Great Britain and Ireland) Isle of Man	The steamship was at anchor in the Formby Channel in the River Mersey in the approaches to Liverpool when the steamer Rita (Spain) collided with and sank her. Her passengers and crew escaped safely in her lifeboats.
North Devon	United Kingdom	The steamship collided with the steamship Summerlee .(United Kingdom) and sank at "St. Nicolas", Bilbao, Spain. She had been refloated and temporary repairs made by 13 April.
Oswingo	United Kingdom	The barque was abandoned at sea after 10 August. Her crew were rescued. She was on a voyagte from Newcastle, New South Wales to San Francisco, California.
Pride of America	United States	The clipper foundered.
Solgran	Germany	The brigantine was driven ashore and wrecked at Natal, Brazil between 24 November and 8 December. Her crew were rescued.
Vauban	France	The schooner was driven ashore and wrecked at Pennard, Glamorgan. Her crew survived.
Unnamed	Flag unknown	A large vessel was seen bottom up on 2 November, by the barque Etimoloquoid (Flag unknown) in the Atlantic Ocean (39°14′N 50°00′W).
Unnamed	Germany	The schooner was driven ashore and wrecked at Natal, Brazil between 24 November and 8 December. Her crew were rescued.
