= Alice Davy =

Alice Davy was a servant at the Tudor court in England.

== Career ==
She was the nurse of Margaret Tudor, daughter of Henry VII of England and Elizabeth of York at Greenwich Palace.

Henry VII requested his treasurer to pay "Alice Davi", and the two women who rocked the Princess' cradle, Anne Mayland and Margaret Troughton, and the day-woman, Alice Bywymble, on 29 June 1490.

Alice Davy subsequently joined the household of Catherine of Aragon.

In January 1519, Henry VIII awarded her £10 yearly in recognition of her services as Margaret's nurse and as a gentlewoman to Catherine of Aragon.
