= Helen Mackay (sculptor) =

British sculptor (1897-1973)

Helen Victoria Mackay (2 April 1897 – 1973) was a British sculptor.

== Biography ==
Mackay was born at Cardiff in Wales. Her father, a railway contractor and quarry owner, died while she was still a child, leaving Mackay to be raised in Wales by her mother. She attended the Cheltenham Ladies' College before studying at the art school of the Regent Street Polytechnic in central London where she won a number of medals for her sculptures. After graduating, she established a studio in London from where she produced sculptures of figures and animal subjects, garden ornaments and portrait busts in bronze, stone, lead and wood.

During her career, Mackay exhibited works at the Royal Academy in London, with the Royal Glasgow Institute of the Fine Arts, at the Royal Scottish Academy in Edinburgh, with the Society of Women Artists and at the Walker Art Gallery in Liverpool. In 1932 she was elected an Associate member of the Royal Society of British Sculptors and was elected a Fellow of the Society in 1952. Mackay died at Fulham in London in 1973.
