= Beryl Williams (actress) =

Welsh actress (1937–2004)

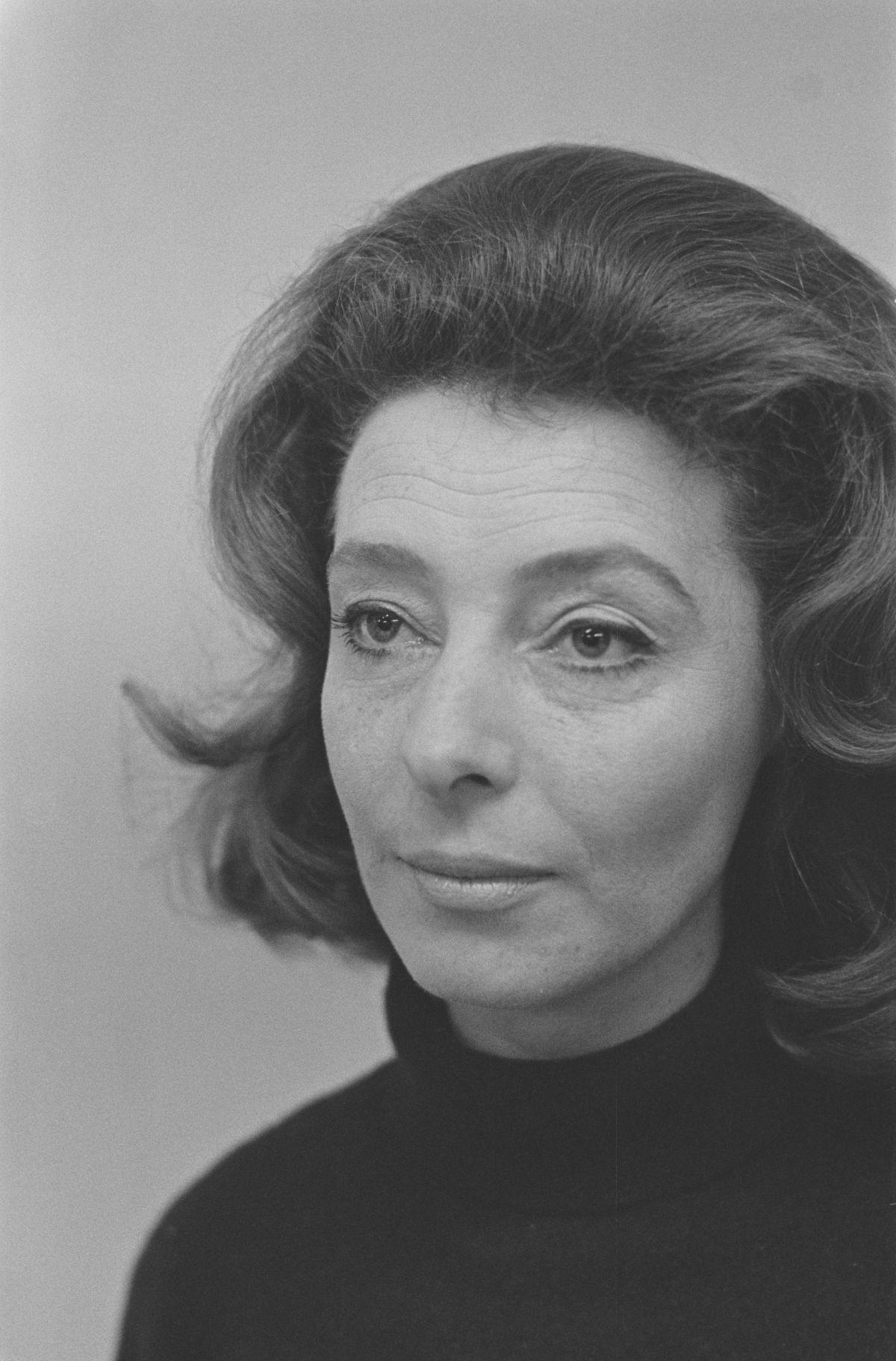
- Born: December 12, 1937; Dolgellau, Wales
- Died: June 18, 2004 (aged 66); Dolgellau, Wales
- Occupation: Actor

Beryl Williams (12 December 1937 – 18 June 2004) was a Welsh actress from Dolgellau, performing in productions for the BBC, Cwmni Theatr Cymru and S4C. She won a BAFTA Cymru award for Best Actress for her role in Nel.

== Early life ==
Beryl Williams was born in Dolgellau as the daughter of an alcoholic tailor. She received a scholarship to attend Dr Williams' School for Girls where she acted in school plays.

In 1957, Williams went to the Rose Bruford College of Drama in London, where she had a relationship with Freddie Jones, one of the leading theatre actors in England.

She returned to Dolgellau after her course, working as a teacher at Dr Williams' School.

== Career ==
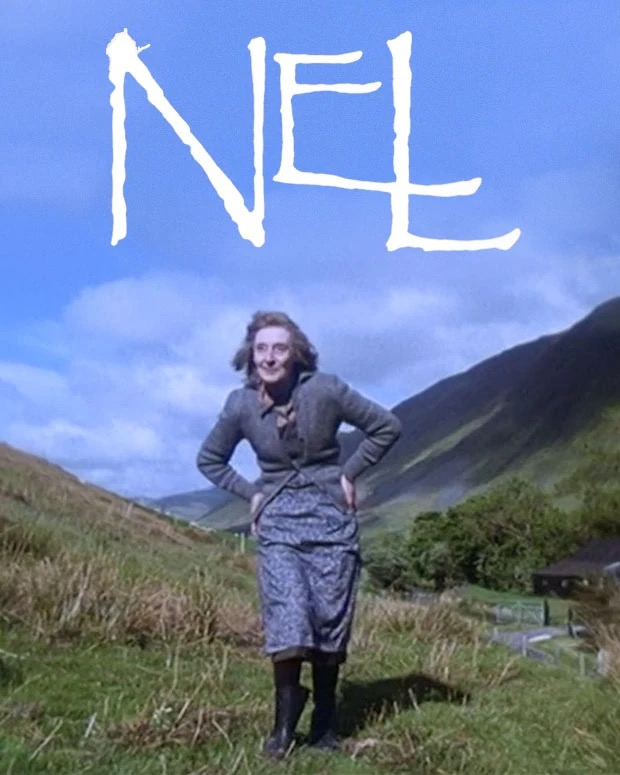
Beryl Williams as Nel (S4C)

Beryl Williams began her career working with BBC drama producer and director Wilbert Lloyd Roberts until he parted ways with the BBC in 1968. Williams appeared in A Rhai yn Fugeiliaid (1961) by Islwyn Ffowc Elis, Byd ar Betws (1966) by Idwal Jones, and Problemau Prifysgol (1968) by Saunders Lewis.

Alongside Wilbert Lloyd Roberts, Beryl Williams helped establish Cwmni Theatr Cymru in the late 1960s, acting in many of their plays until the early 1970s, when she suddenly left rehearsals to return to Dolgellau citing a "family emergency".

In the 1980s, Beryl Williams worked with Theatr Bara Caws, directing and acting, as well as appearing in a variety of television dramas, including Sul y Blodau (1986) by Meic Povey. She also played Gwen Elis in the drama series Minafon (1983–1989).

In 1991, Beryl Williams won the first BAFTA Cymru for Best Actress for the lead role in Meic Povey's drama Nel.

Williams retired from acting in the 1990s to look after her elderly dying mother.

== Death ==
Beryl Williams died in Dolgellau Hospital on 18 June 2004 after a long illness.
