= Electrovamp =

Welsh electropop musical duo

- Also known as: Kute
- Origin: Caerphilly, Wales
- Genres: Dance-pop; electropop
- Years active: 2005–present
- Label: Island
- Members: Tammy-Jay Davies; Kally Davies

Electrovamp are a Welsh electropop duo, consisting of sisters Tammy-Jay and Kally Davies (the younger), who were signed to Island Records. They were originally called Kute and supported Girls Aloud on their What Will the Neighbours Say? Live tour consisting of 25 dates in the UK. They have released four singles to date, their debut single, "I Don't Like the Vibe in the VIP", released on 31 December 2007, followed by "Drinks Taste Better When They're Free", which was released on 13 October 2008 and appears on the soundtrack to the 2008 comedy film How to Lose Friends & Alienate People (which also includes another song by them, titled "I Love What You Do"). Electrovamp were nominated for Best New Artist at the TRL Awards 2008 in Italy.

They are now working on music independently, parting ways with their producers because of creative differences. The group have also recorded the song "Playing Hardball", a duet with American pop singer Adam Tyler.

In April 2012 their song "Electroqueer" was included on the compilation This Beat Is... POPTRONIK – Volume One. In May 2012 they released their third official single "Hands Up", which was later reissued as a duet with YouTube celebrity Keenan Cahill. Their latest single, "Instinctual", was released in March 2014.

== Discography ==
=== Singles ===
- "I Don't Like the Vibe in the VIP" (2007)
- "Drinks Taste Better When They're Free" (2008)
- "Hands Up" (2012)
- "Hands Up" (featuring Keenan Cahill) (2012)
- "Instinctual" (2014)
