= Josepha Heath Gulston =

Welsh novelist

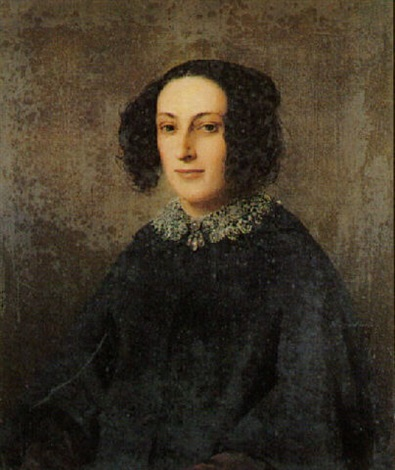
- portrait by William Charles Thomas Dobson
- Born: 23 February 1811
- Died: 15 November 1859; Grosvenor Square
- Occupation: Novelist
- Parents: Joseph Gulston (father); Anna Maria Knowles (mother)

Josepha Heath Gulston (23 February 1811 – 15 November 1859) was a Welsh novelist. She published five novels in the 1850s under the pseudonym Talbot Gwynne.

She was the eldest daughter of Joseph Gulston, owner of the Derwydd estate in Carmarthenshire, and Anna Maria Knowles. Her novel The School for Fathers was read by Charlotte Brontë and George Eliot, and her novel Young Singleton may have been an influence on Eliot's Daniel Deronda. She also published a children's fantasy story with lithographed illustrations called The Goblin's Moonlight Walk in 1844.

== Bibliography ==
- The Goblin's Moonlight Walk. James Izard, 1844.
- The School for Fathers: An Old English Story. 1 vol. London: Smith, Elder, 1852.
- The Life and Death of Silas Barnstarke: A Story of the Seventeenth Century. 1 vol. London: Smith, Elder, 1853.
- The School for Dreamers: A Story of the Present Day. 1 vol. London: Smith, Elder, 1853.
- Nanette and her Lovers. 1 vol. London: Smith, Elder, 1854.
- Young Singleton. 2 vol. London: Smith, Elder, 1856.
