= Marian Lyons =

British local government politician (1923–2017)

Marian Lyon

Clwyd County Council leader
- In office 1974–1978
- Preceded by: Office created

County Councillor for Abergele District in Denbighshire (later Clwyd) County Council
- Incumbent
- Assumed office 1964

Urban District Councillor for Llanddulas, Abergele Urban District Council
- Incumbent
- Assumed office 1963

Personal details
- Born: 1923 Elland, West Yorkshire, UK
- Died: 11 January 2017 (aged 95–96) Bron-y-Graig Llanddulas
- Party: Independent
- Profession: Nursing

Marian Lyons (1923 – January 2017) was the first woman to lead a county council in the United Kingdom, as leader of Clwyd County Council from 1974 - 1978.

== Personal life ==
Marian Lyon was the daughter of Wilfrid Spence, an engineer, and Elizabeth (née Scott). She was brought up in Elland and qualified as a nurse during the Second World War. While working as an ophthalmic nurse in Leeds Infirmary she met her future husband Edward Lyons and they married in London in 1945. They had five children.

== Political career ==
The Lyons moved to Llanddulas, North Wales in 1954, and she was led into local politics to make a difference to the village community. She was elected as a councillor for Llanddulas in the Abergele urban district council in 1963, becoming the chair in 1965. She was also a Denbighshire county councillor for the Abergele district from 1964. She was elected as the leader of the new Clwyd county council in 1974, when this was formed by a local government reorganisation merging Denbighshire and Flintshire. At this time 17% of local councillors were women

In the 1970s she a member of the Court of the University of Wales representing Clwyd County Council and a member of the Welsh Council in the late 1970s.

== Other public roles ==
She was a committee member of the Abergele Ratepayers Association, a member of a joint committee for translation of the bible into Welsh and a governor of the Royal Welsh College of Music and Drama. In later life Lyon was president of the Flintshire branch of the Royal College of Nursing and commandant of the Abergele group of the British Red Cross.

She also founded the Abergele branch of the University of the 3rd Age.

She was invited to the Investiture of Prince Charles in 1969 and in 1977 Lyon received the Queen's Silver Jubilee medal.
