= Buddig Anwylini Pughe =

Welsh artist (1857–1939)

Buddig Anwylini Pughe (1857–1939) was a professional Welsh artist who travelled extensively in Europe, including Paris, Rome and Venice. She was born in Aberdyfi in Gwynedd.

== Personal life ==
Buddug Anwylini Pughe was the daughter of the antiquarian scholar and physician John Pughe, also known as Ioan ab Hu Feddyg (1814-1874) and Catherine Samuel. Her father published a biography of the bard Eben Fardd. He also translated Meddygon Myddfai, the Physicians of Myddfai, published by the Welsh MSS. Society in 1864. Four of Buddug's brothers were physicians, three of whom - John Eliot Howard (died 1880), Rheinallt Navalaw, Taliesin William Owen (died 1893) - practised at Liverpool, and David Roberts (died 1885), who lived in Montgomeryshire.

At some point in her life, Buddug became the owner of a pictorial dictionary compiled by her deaf aunt, Elizabeth Pughe (1826-1847). This dictionary is evidence of the Pugh family's wish to give their daughter a good education decades ahead of the Elementary Education (Blind and Deaf Children) Act 1893, which made basic education for deaf children compulsory. According to the archival book plate, Buddug eventually donated this dictionary to the National Library of Wales.

== Career ==
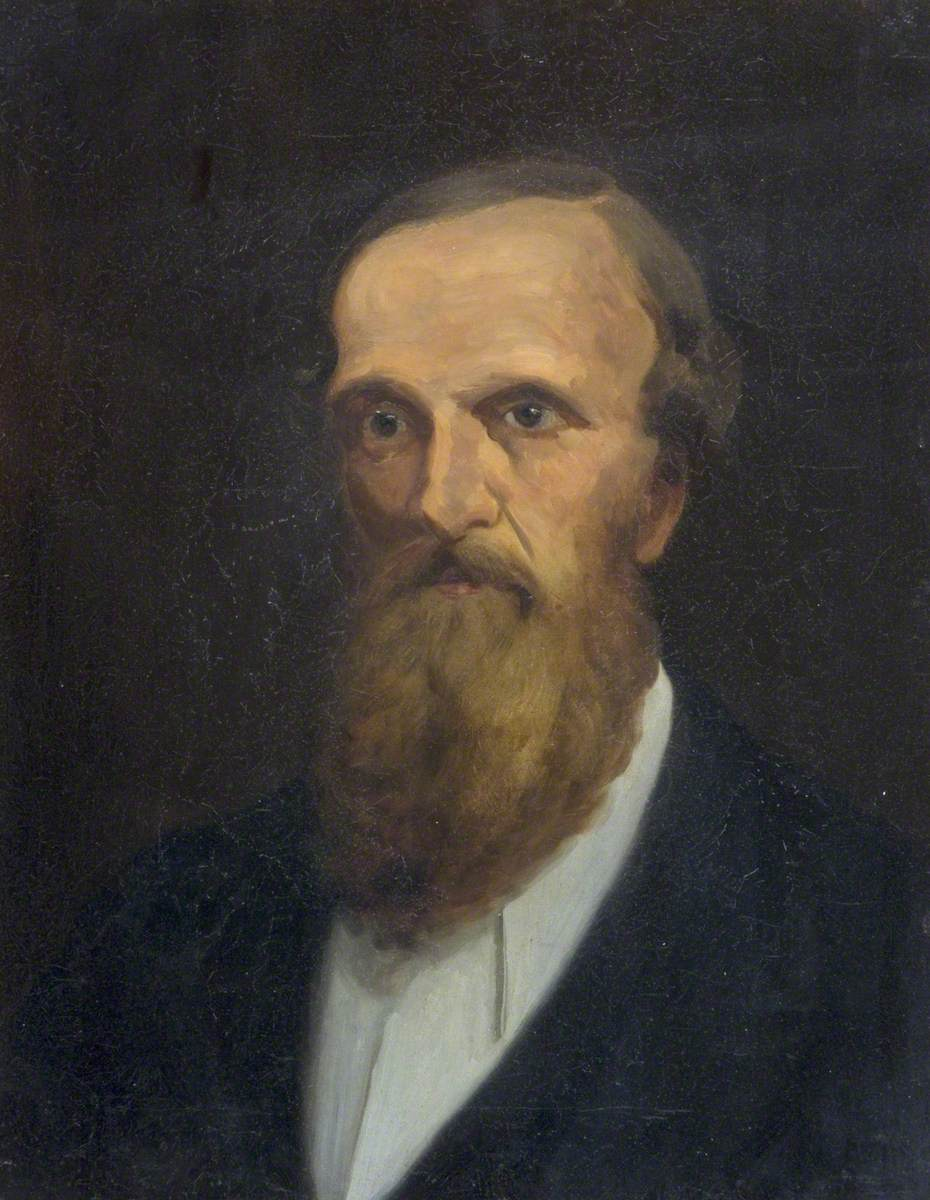
John Pughe (1815-1874) painted by his daughter Buddig Anwylini Pughe

Her paintings include a number of portraits, including those depicting her father John Pughe, Dr TF Roberts, the Principal of the University of Wales, and his family and Robert Parry. She painted The Shakespeare Memorial Theatre, Stratford on Avon in 1905 and Figure Study in 1895. Her work also includes the watercolour Monk playing an oboe in a chapel interior in 1886.

Buddug Anwyli Pughe studied at Liverpool School of Art, Heatherley's in London and Collarosi's in Paris. She first exhibited at the Royal Academy in 1886 and worked in Paris, Rome and Venice. She was a member of the Liverpool Academy of Arts, the Liverpool Sketch Club and the Irish Water Colour Society. She returned to Aberdyfi around 1905 where she continued to paint both landscapes and portraits. Her landscape works include A Sunlit Village Church and several landscapes of Aberdyfi. She died in Liverpool in 1939.

Despite painting hundreds of paintings as a professional artist, few of her paintings appear in public galleries. One was recorded in the National Library of Wales in 1991 - The Old Lacemaker . Some of her paintings appeared in the Walker Art Gallery in Liverpool for over 50 years but only one remains there. Dolgelley Fair was exhibited in the National Academy in 1924.
