= Lisa Parry =

British playwright

Lisa Parry is a playwright, based in Cardiff. Her work has been staged by new writing companies in the UK and USA. She has been shortlisted for various awards, including Theatre Uncut's Political Playwriting Award, the BBC Audio Awards and her drama Not was named one of the Royal Shakespeare Company's 37 Plays.

== Career in theatre, audio and film ==
Parry studied playwriting at the University of Birmingham and read English Language and Literature at Exeter College, Oxford. In 2011, she co-founded Agent 160 Theatre Company and co-produced two of its shows: a run of short plays by female playwrights in Cardiff, London and Glasgow, and also a series of female monologues at Wales Millennium Centre. The company was set up in response to the statistic that only 17% of plays across the UK are written by women. The company closed in 2014.

In 2016, Parry co-founded Illumine Theatre Company with director Zoë Waterman. The company's first production – of Parry's play 2023 – opened to rave reviews in October 2018. Wales Arts Review described it as "wonderfully written...it tackles a sensitive topic with intelligence and creativity. It is funny without being too light, and emotive without being too heavy." Art Scene in Wales called it "a truly thought-provoking piece... It is certainly a play that will stay with its audience far after its end". Buzz Magazine described the piece as "a morality tale for the Black Mirror generation", and Get the Chance described it as "[a] stunning new play... Lisa Parry's script is crisp and lucid. I propose that it is in the running for best Welsh play of 2018". The company has since produced two audio dramas: Tremolo, for which Welsh actor Gareth Elis won the Marc Beeby BBC Audio Drama Award for Best Debut Performance; and Deuce.

Among the companies that have staged Parry's work are: Dirty Protest, The Miniaturists, PopUp Theatrics and Sherman Theatre. Her work has been produced at: the Barbican Centre, the Other Room, Wales Millennium Centre, Chapter Arts Centre, Theatre503, Arcola Theatre, The Actors Company Theatre (Broadway, New York), the Arches Theatre, Bridewell Theatre and Martin E Segal Theatre (New York). In 2019, it was announced that Parry's The Merthyr Stigmatist will be staged at the Sherman in Cardiff in 2020 as part of artistic director Joe Murphy's first season, as a co-production with Theatre Uncut. It was called one of "the theatre shows you won't want to miss" by BBC News and praised as "surely 2020's best premise for a play". Production was delayed owing to COVID-19 and it was released digitally, with The Guardian calling it "theatrical magic from the Valleys" and Theatre Weekly saying "Parry proves to be an urgent and contemporary voice".

Parry's short film "Inside the Piano Shop" is included in The Impact, a collaborative film, released in 2022, composed of 37 short films from around the world.

== Plays ==
- 2023 (Chapter Arts Centre & Illumine Theatre, 2018).
- Alex (Arcola Theatre & The Miniaturists, 2019).
- Lump (Paines Plough & Dirty Protest).
- The Order of the Object (Theatr Clwyd, 2021).
- The Merthyr Stigmatist (Sherman Theatre, 2021).
- Tremolo (Illumine Theatre, 2022).
- Deuce (Illumine Theatre, 2023).
- Not (Royal Shakespeare Company's 37 Plays Project, 2023).
- Salem (Sherman Theatre and Royal Welsh College of Music & Drama, 2025).

== Speaking and writing ==
Parry has also worked as a news journalist, her work appearing in regional and national publications; however, she left because she "couldn't shake off the fact I wasn't telling stories in the way I wanted to. They felt constrained inside a formula". She has continued to contribute to various online and print journals and has written for The Guardian and contributed to BBC Radio 4, discussing the arts scene in Wales. Parry has also spoken on panels about feminism and theatre and science and theatre, giving a talk for TEDx in Cardiff. In 2019 and 2020, Parry was named as one of Wales Arts Review''s 100 Women of Wales on Twitter.
