= Edrica Huws =

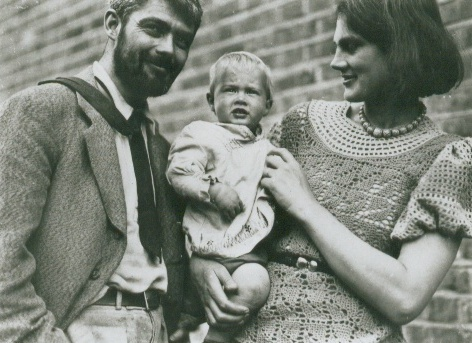
- Born: 12 January 1907
- Died: 10 June 1999 (aged 92)
- Resting place: Llanddyfnan
- Occupation: Poet

Edrica Huws (12 January 1907 – 10 June 1999) was a textile artist. Her father, Thomas Tyrwhitt, was an architect who also worked with watercolors and engravings. She is also the mother of Welsh historian Daniel Huws.

== Early life ==
Born in London, and attending St. Pauls Girls' School, she eventually married Welsh draftsman and architect, Richard Huws in 1931, before moving to Talwrn, a village on the Isle of Anglesey, to raise their four children.

== Adulthood ==
Edrica Huws trained as an artist at the Chelsea School of Art and earned an ARCA diploma at the Royal College of Art in London, developing her own technique for creating art works using fibre patchwork. Although Edrica stopped producing patchwork art to concentrate on raising her children, she collected pieces of fabric over the years, to be used when she could return to her practice.

Before returning to fibre patchwork, Edrica wrote poetry, with multiple pieces being published in popular magazines of the time, such as, The Times Literary Supplement and The Listner.

== Achievements ==
After completing studies at the Royal College of Art, Edrica was commissioned to paint a series of panels inside the building of St. Mary's Church in South Benfleet.

Edrica was 51 when she began her first large patchwork of a greenhouse which took a year to produce.^{[3]} She eventually was able to complete an average sized patchwork in about a month.

Following the death of her husband she moved to Paris and continued to work into her 70s and 80s. In 1982, she had her first exhibition at the Le Bleu du Ciel gallery in Vélzelay, France. Also in 1982, a bilingual Japanese/English book of her artwork, Edrica Huws: Patchwork Pictures, was published. Edrica's first exhibition at Ginza Shiseido gallery in Tokyo followed a year later. This resulted in Edrica becoming a household name in the respective countries.

A collection of poems written between 1943 and 1953, were published in a booklet, Poems, printed in 1994 by Embers Handpress, Rhiwargor.

In 1998, two of Edrica's patchworks were requested by special invitation for exhibition of the World Quilting Festival in Tokyo. This brought Edrica's work to the attention of the global quilting community, especially in America.

== Death and Influence ==
Edrica died on 10 June 1999, aged 91, and was buried alongside her husband Richard at Llanddyfnan Churchyard.

Edrica Huws’ family organised an exhibition of her work in Anglesey in 2007, using prints and cards to help raise funds for the National Eisteddfod.

Edrica's total amount of completed artworks was 187, over 60 are in Japan, over 50 are in France, with the rest in the United Kingdom.
