= Victoria Perkins =

Welsh boxer (born 2004)

Personal information
- Nickname: VIP
- Nationality: (Wales) Welsh
- Born: 14 January 2004 (age 22)
- Height: 6 ft (183 cm)
- Weight: Super-bantamweight

Boxing career
- Stance: Orthodox

Boxing record
- Wins: 3
- Losses: 1

Victoria Perkins (born 14 January 2004) is a Welsh professional boxer. She became the first British Boxing Board of Control sanctioned Welsh female champion by defeating Ashleigh Johnson 97–93 on points for the inaugural super-bantamweight title at Selwyn Samuel Centre, Llanelli, on 17 August 2024. Perkins was previously a kickboxer who won an under-18s world title aged 13 and went on to amass two more global championships prior to switching sports.
