= Bethan Nia =

Welsh singer and harpist

Bethan Nia is a Welsh singer and harpist of traditional and contemporary music. Noted for her beguiling interpretations of traditional Welsh language folk music, she also writes songs in English on traditional themes.

She is winner of the Danny Kyle Award 2008 at Glasgow's Celtic Connections Festival.

She has performed at Glastonbury and Lorient Interceltic Festivals amongst others.
