= Elinor Evans =

Elinor Evans is a Welsh painter born in Criccieth in 1982, now based in Gredos National park, Spain. She was selected for Art Review’s Ten of the Best B.A Graduates in 2003. Her work often features people wearing animal masks and is often inspired by the animals she lives amongst and the horses she breeds.

== Education ==
Evans studied at Chelsea College of Arts from 2003 to 2005, gaining a First Class BA (Hons) degree in Art and Design (Painting) before gaining an MA in painting at the Royal College of Art (2003-2005).

== Awards ==
- 2004 Amlin award for most promising young artist
- Gold medal in Fine Art at the National Eisteddfod in 2004

== Selected works ==
- The shaman project 2006
- Naked behind the mask exhibition 2008
- The masked princess exhibition May 2011
- The birth of domestication 2013
- The wolf and the watchdog 2013
- Picasso's ancestors 2013
- Afternoon ride 2023
