= Siân Evans =

Welsh author and journalist

Siân Evans is a Welsh historical author, journalist, and film consultant, known for her guidebooks for the National Trust, of which she has written seven, and her works of social and cultural history. She has written a biography of Dame Margaret Greville and an account of six society hostesses in Britain between the World Wars.

== Early life and career ==
Siân Evans was born to David and Rae. Born and raised in Whitchurch, Cardiff and attended Howells School, Llandaff.

She has worked for the National Trust, the Victoria & Albert Museum, and the Design Museum.

== Writing ==
Until 2016, all of Evans's books were published by the National Trust, and they include seven guidebooks to properties in their ownership as well as a book of ghost stories associated with trust properties and other works relating to the life of the country house. She has also written for the BBC Antiques Roadshow Magazine, the Daily Mail, the Daily Express, Coast Magazine, and the National Trust Members' Magazine. Her first biography was Mrs Ronnie: The society hostess who collected kings (2013) which dealt with the life of Dame Margaret Greville of Polesden Lacey.

Her first book not to be published by the National Trust was Queen bees: Six brilliant and extraordinary society hostesses between the wars (Two Rivers, 2016) which chronicled the lives of six women, Nancy Astor, Maud Cunard, Laura Mae Corrigan, Margaret Greville, Sibyl Colefax, and Edith Londonderry, some of whom were of humble origins, who became successful society hostesses in Britain between the World Wars. Reviewing the book in The Times, Virginia Nicholson found it to excel in anecdotes, punchlines, and descriptions of the detail of social mountaineering but to lack a deeper analysis of the motives of its subjects. Frances Wilson in The Spectator described the women as less "brilliant and extraordinary" than "silly, sycophantic and generally pro-Nazi", feeling that Evans had overstated the importance of her subjects and questioning the decision to treat them as a group rather than singly, "queen bees being hard to distinguish in a swarm".

== Selected publications ==
=== National Trust guidebooks ===
- Saltram, Devon: A souvenir guide. National Trust, 2012. ISBN 9781843593577
- Avebury Manor: A souvenir guide. National Trust, 2014. ISBN 9781843594451
- Killerton, Devon: A souvenir guide. National Trust, 2014. ISBN 9781843594369

=== Other works ===
- Ghosts: Spooky stories and eerie encounters from the National Trust. National Trust, 2006. ISBN 978-1905400379
- Pattern Design: A period design sourcebook. National Trust Books, 2008. ISBN 978-1905400676
- Life Below Stairs in the Victorian and Edwardian Country House. National Trust Books, 2011. ISBN 978-1907892110
- The Manor Reborn: The transformation of Avebury Manor. National Trust Books, 2011. ISBN 978-1907892240
- Mrs Ronnie: The society hostess who collected kings. National Trust Books, 2013. ISBN 978-1907892387
- Queen Bees: Six brilliant and extraordinary society hostesses between the wars. Two Roads, 2016. ISBN 978-1473618022
- "Let the World Burn through you" in The Women Writers Handbook. Aurora Metro Books. 2020. ISBN 9781912430338
- Maiden Voyages: Magnificent ocean liners and the women who traveled and worked aboard them. St. Martin's Press, 2021. ISBN 9781250246462.
