= Nesdi Jones =

Singer

Nesdi Jones aka Nêst Aneirin (born 11 December 1992) is a Welsh singer-songwriter.

Born and brought up in Criccieth, North Wales, who sings and raps in four languages: Hindi, Punjabi, English and Welsh. Her debut Punjabi song ‘London’ was a successful collaboration with Money Aujla and Yo Yo Honey Singh. The track topped the Asian charts to Number 1. She won best newcomer award in the UK Bhangra Music Awards.

A Welsh TV channel "S4C" aired a special documentary about her journey over the last three years in which time she has become a huge star in India.
