= Mari Lloyd-Williams =

Welsh nurse

Mari Lloyd-Williams is a Welsh medical consultant who specialises in palliative care. She taught at the University of Liverpool for more than two decades before moving to Liverpool John Moores University in 2022.

== Biography ==
Mari Lloyd-Williams was born to Margaret Winter Davies and county councillor Lloyd Williams. She was educated at Leicester Medical School. In 2000, she became a Consultant and Honorary Senior Lecturer for the University Hospitals of Leicester NHS Trust and LOROS Hospice after completing her palliative medicine training with them. In 2002, she moved to the University of Liverpool, where she became a Senior Lecturer and was later granted a personal chair at the School of Population, Community and Behavioural Sciences in 2003. In 2022, she moved to Liverpool John Moores University and became Professor of Palliative and Supportive Care. She also holds an honorary consultant position in palliative medicine with the Marie Curie Hospice, Liverpool and the Liverpool clinical commissioning group.

As an academic, Lloyd-Williams specialises in palliative care. Among her work in palliative care includes the leadership of a project involving more than a hundred elderly people in a rural village. With the support of The Prince's Countryside Fund, she was granted a Churchill Fellowship in 2019 for the purposes of traveling to the Faroe Islands and Ireland to "[develop] volunteer-led palliative care facilities in rural communities". She told the Denbighshire Free Press that she would use the Fellowship funds for a visit to Giljagarður, an elderly community in the Faroese town of Leirvík.

She was elected Fellow of the Learned Society of Wales in 2011. She is also a Fellow of the Royal College of Physicians and a Fellow of the Royal College of General Practitioners.
