= Mary Owen (hymnwriter) =

Welsh hymnwriter

Mary Owen (born Mary Rees in 1796 in Briton Ferry, Wales; died 1875) was a Welsh hymnwriter.

Owen was born in 1796 in Ynys-y-Mardy, Briton Ferry, Wales to Daniel and Mary Rees. Her father was a deacon, and religious services took place in their family home.

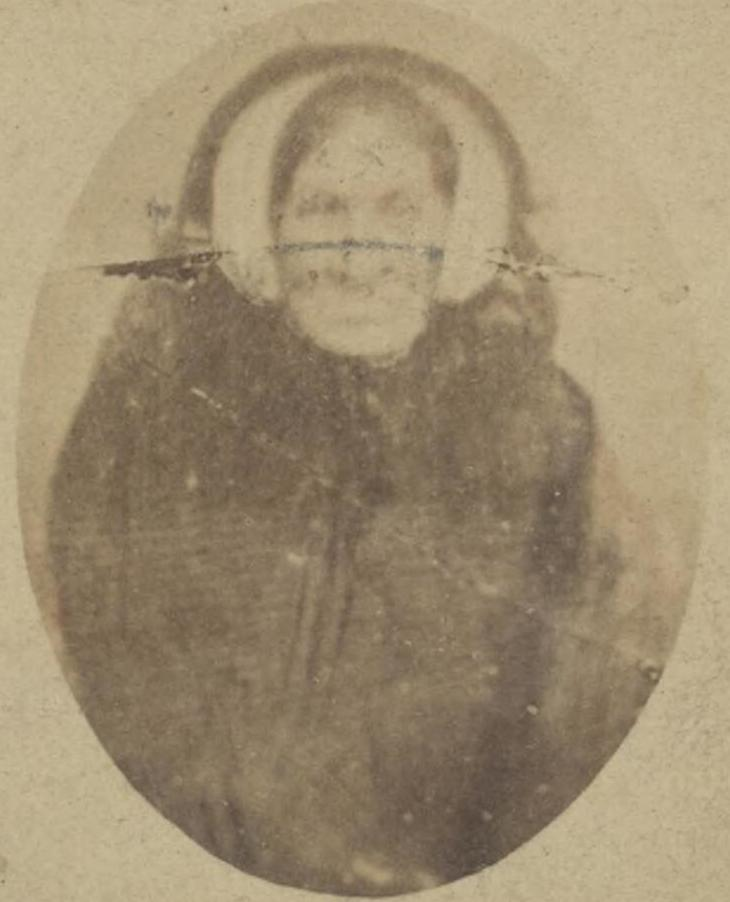
Portrait of Mary Owen

Owen was a prolific hymnwriter; her hymns include "Caed modd i faddeu 'meiau", "Y gareg a dorwyd o'r mynydd", "Fe dderfydd fy ngofidiau", and "Fe gân y gwaredigion". A collection of Owen's hymns, Hymnau ar Amryw Destunau, was published in four editions, the first of which was printed in 1839. The collection has an introduction by Rev. William Williams (Caledfryn).

Owen married twice. Her first husband, Thomas Davies, was a sailor. Her second husband, Robert Owen, was Congregational minister.

Owen died on 26 May 1875 and was buried in Briton Ferry.
