= List of Welsh people =

This is a list of Welsh people; an ethnic group and nation associated with Wales.

Historian John Davies argues that the origin of the Welsh nation can be traced to the late 4th and early 5th centuries, following the Roman departure from Britain, although Brythonic or other Celtic languages seem to have been spoken in Wales since much earlier.

This list is for people of Welsh heritage and descent, and for those otherwise perceived as Welsh; through either birth or adoption. Only those meeting notability criteria are included. A few people appear in more than one section of the list.

== Actors ==
- Keith Allen (born 1953)
- Bennett Arron (born 1973), also comedian and writer
- Stanley Baker (1927–1976)
- Aneurin Barnard (born 1987)
- Hywel Bennett (1944–2017)
- David Bower (born 1969)
- Rob Brydon (born 1965)
- Richard Burton (1925–1984)
- Boyd Clack (born 1951), also writer and musician
- Morfydd Clark (born 1989)
- Richard Ian Cox (born 1973), also comedian and radio host
- Gabrielle Creevy (born 1996)
- Timothy Dalton (born 1946)
- Charles Danby (1858–1906)
- Hannah Daniel (born 1986)
- Josie d'Arby (born 1973), also presenter
- Gareth David-Lloyd (born 1981)
- Garnon Davies (born 1982)
- Geraint Wyn Davies (born 1957)
- Phoebe Davies (1864–1912)
- Richard Davies (1926–2015)
- Ryan Davies (1937–1977)
- Windsor Davies (1930–2019)
- Lauren Drew (born 1993)
- Robert East (born 1943)
- Aimee-Ffion Edwards (born 1987)
- Maudie Edwards (1906–1991)
- Taron Egerton (born 1989)
- Tom Ellis (born 1978)
- Peg Entwistle (1908–1932)
- Clifford Evans (1912–1985)
- Luke Evans (born 1979)
- Pam Ferris (born 1948)
- Huw Garmon (born 1966)
- Colin George (1929–2016)
- Sian Gibson
- Matthew Gravelle (born 1976)
- Danny Grehan (born 1965)
- Hugh Griffith (1912–1980)
- Kenneth Griffith (1921–2006)
- Ioan Gruffudd (born 1973)
- Edmund Gwenn (1875–1958)
- Mike Gwilym (born 1949)
- Robert Gwilym (born 1956)
- Lyn Harding (1867–1952)
- Doris Hare (1905–2000)
- Mali Harries (born 1976)
- Richard Harrington (born 1975)
- Georgia Henshaw (born 1993)
- Anthony Hopkins (born 1937)
- Callum Scott Howells (born 1999)
- Donald Houston (1923–1991)
- Glyn Houston (1926–2019)
- Aneirin Hughes (born 1958)
- Gareth Hughes (1894–1965)
- Nerys Hughes (born 1941)
- Llŷr Ifans (born 1968)
- Rhys Ifans (born 1967)
- Emrys James (1928–1989)
- Hywel John (born c.1970), more notable as a playwright
- Margaret John (1926–2011)
- Glynis Johns (1923–2024)
- Mervyn Johns (1899–1992)
- Gary Jones (born 1958)
- Mark Lewis Jones (born 1964)
- Ruth Jones (born 1967)
- Terry Jones (1942–2020)
- Eddie Ladd, also contemporary dancer
- Kate Lamb (born 1988)
- Helen Lederer (born 1954)
- Gwilym Lee (born 1983)
- Raymond Llewellyn (born 1928)
- Desmond Llewelyn (1914–1999)
- Bernard Lloyd (1934–2018)
- Philip Madoc (1934–2012)
- Ruth Madoc (1943–2022)
- Steven Meo (born 1977)
- Ray Milland (1907–1986)
- Elizabeth Morgan (born 1930)
- Eve Myles (born 1978)
- Kimberley Nixon (born 1985)
- Jonny Owen (born 1971)
- Kai Owen (born 1975)
- John Owen-Jones (born 1971)
- Joanna Page (born 1978)
- Siân Phillips (born 1934)
- Tom Price (born 1980)
- Jonathan Pryce (born 1947)
- Ian Puleston-Davies (born 1959)
- Angharad Rees (1949–2012)
- Roger Rees (1944–2015)
- Iwan Rheon (born 1985)
- Steffan Rhodri (born 1967)
- Ieuan Rhys (born 1961)
- Matthew Rhys (born 1974)
- Paul Rhys (born 1963)
- John Rhys-Davies (born 1944)
- Ieuan Rhys Williams (1909–1973)
- Rachel Roberts (1927–1980)
- Matt Ryan (born 1981)
- Michael Sheen (born 1969)
- Sarah Siddons (1755–1831)
- William Simons (1940–2019)
- Steve Speirs (born 1965)
- Victor Spinetti (1933–2012)
- Gareth Thomas (1945–2016)
- Talfryn Thomas (1922–1982)
- William Thomas
- Tim Vincent (born 1972), also presenter
- Melanie Walters (born 1962)
- Naunton Wayne (1901–1970)
- Laurie Webb (1924–2026)
- Andy Whitfield (1972–2011)
- Ian Whyte (born 1971)
- Robert Wilfort (born 1977)
- Emlyn Williams (1905–1987), also dramatist
- Peter Wingfield (born 1962)
- Owain Yeoman (born 1978)
- Catherine Zeta-Jones (born 1969)
- Alexander Vlahos (born 1988)
- Gerran Howell (born 1991)

== Architects ==
- Jonathan Adams (born 1961)
- William Edwards (1719–1789)
- Alwyn Sheppard Fidler (1909–1990)
- John St. Bodfan Gruffydd (1910–2004)
- Inigo Jones (1573–1652), born in London to Welsh parents
- John Jones (1810–1869)
- Owen Jones (1809–1874), born in London of Welsh descent
- Ernest Morgan (1881–1954)
- John Nash (1753–1835), born in London to Welsh parents
- Malcolm Parry (born c.1938), architect, academic and TV presenter
- John Prichard (1817–1886)
- Gwynne Pugh (currently active)
- David Wyn Roberts (1911–1982)
- Percy Thomas (1883–1969)
- Revd. Thomas Thomas (1817–1888)
- E. M. Bruce Vaughan (1856–1919)
- Clough Williams-Ellis (1883–1978)

== Artists ==
- Iwan Bala (born 1956), painter and mixed media artist
- Roger Cecil (1942–2015), painter and mixed media artist
- Glenys Cour (born 1924), painter
- Ivor Davies (born 1935), painter, mixed media, installation and mosaic artist
- Thomas Nathaniel Davies (1922–1996), painter and sculptor
- Edith Downing (1857–1931), sculptor
- Ken Elias (born 1944), painter
- Nick Evans (1907–2004), painter
- Barry Flanagan (1941–2009), sculptor
- Laura Ford (born 1961), sculptor
- David Garner (born 1958), installation artist
- John Gibson (1790–1866), sculptor
- Tony Goble (1943–2007), painter
- Dan Llywelyn Hall (born 1980), painter
- Nina Hamnett (1890–1956), painter
- Clive Hicks-Jenkins (born 1951), painter
- Robert Alwyn Hughes (1935–2020), painter
- Alfred Janes (1911–1999), painter
- Augustus John (1878–1961), painter
- Goscombe John (1860–1952), sculptor
- Gwen John (1876–1939), painter
- David Jones (1895–1974), artist and poet
- Martyn Jones (born 1955), painter
- Thomas Jones (1742–1803), painter
- Heinz Koppel (1919–1980), painter, moved to Wales as a young man
- Mervyn Levy (1915–1996), painter, art dealer, writer and critic
- Osi Rhys Osmond (1942–2015), painter and television presenter
- Geoffrey Olsen (1943–2007), painter
- Michael Gustavius Payne (born 1969), painter
- Shani Rhys James (born 1953), painter, moved to Wales after graduation
- Ceri Richards (1903–1971), painter
- Will Roberts (1907–2000), painter
- John Uzzell Edwards (1937–2014), painter
- Andrew Vicari (1938–2016), painter
- Bedwyr Williams (born 1974), installation and performance artist
- Kyffin Williams (1918–2006), painter
- Richard Wilson (1714–1782), painter
- Nathan Wyburn (born 1989), food artist
- Ernest Zobole (1927–1999), painter

== Designers ==
- Laura Ashley (1925–1985)
- Jeff Banks (born 1943)
- David Emanuel (born 1952)
- Timothy Everest (born 1961)
- Ross Lovegrove (born 1958)
- Julien Macdonald (born 1971)
- Tommy Nutter (1943–1992)
- Jayne Pierson (born 1969/1970)
- Mary Quant (1934–2023)

== Entrepreneurs ==
- Richard ap Meryk (or ap Meurig), Anglicised to Richard Amerike (or Ameryk) (c. 1445–1503), after whom America is reputed to be named
- Gomer Berry, 1st Viscount Kemsley (1883–1968), newspaper publisher
- William Berry, 1st Viscount Camrose (1879–1954), newspaper publisher
- Joe Blackman (born c. 1984), events and entertainment industry entrepreneur
- David Davies Llandinam (1818–1890), industrialist
- Griffith J. Griffith (1850–1919), mining millionaire
- John Josiah Guest (1785–1852), ironmaster
- John Hughes (1814–1889), businessman and founder of the city of Donetsk, Ukraine
- Sir William Thomas Lewis (1837–1914), coalowner
- Terry Matthews (born 1943), telecommunications billionaire, owner of Celtic Manor Resort
- Michael Moritz (born 1962), investor
- Charles Stewart Rolls (1877–1910), motor car manufacturer and aviator
- Howard Stringer (born 1942), businessman
- David Sullivan (born 1949), publisher
- David Alfred Thomas (1856–1918), industrialist

== Explorers ==
- Perce Blackborow (1896–1949)
- John Evans (1770–1799)
- George Everest (1790–1866)
- Henry Morton Stanley (1841–1904)

== Film directors ==
- Kevin Allen (born 1962)
- Gareth Evans (born 1980)
- John Evans (born 1980)
- Marc Evans (born 1963)
- Peter Greenaway (born 1942)
- Terry Jones (1942–2020)
- Justin Kerrigan (born 1974)
- Richard Marquand (1938–1987)
- Julian Richards (born 1968)
- Sara Sugarman (born 1962)

== Humourists ==
- Bennett Arron (born 1973), comedian, writer, actor, and television presenter
- Max Boyce (born 1945), entertainer
- Connor Colquhoun (born 1996), voice actor, YouTube content creator, and co-host of Trash Taste.
- Tommy Cooper (1922–1984), comedian and magician
- Lee Dainton (born 1973), Dirty Sanchez television series
- Greg Davies (born 1968), comedian and host of Taskmaster (TV series)
- Ryan Davies (1937–1977), comedian and singer
- Rhod Gilbert (born 1968), comedian and BBC Radio Wales personality
- Elis James (born 1980), comedian, actor, and capable broadcaster
- Terry Jones (1942–2020), comedian (Monty Python series), author, and film director
- Gladys Morgan (1898–1983), comedian
- Tessie O'Shea (1913–1997), stand-up comedian
- Mathew Pritchard, Dirty Sanchez television series
- Griff Rhys Jones (born 1953), comic writer, actor, and presenter
- Harry Secombe (1921–2001), comedian, actor, singer, and television presenter
- Paul Whitehouse (born 1958), writer and actor
- Ronnie Williams (1939–1997), actor and comedian

== Inventors ==
- William Davies Evans (1790–1872)
- William Frost (1848–1935), amateur aviator
- William Robert Grove (1811–1896)
- John Jones (1645–1709)
- Adam Powell (born 1976), creator of Neopets
- William Henry Preece (1834–1913)
- Richard Roberts (1789–1864), mechanical engineer
- Edwin Stevens (1905–1995), designed the world's first wearable electronic hearing aid
- Thomas Williams of Llanidan (1737–1802)
- Walter Clopton Wingfield (1833–1912), inventor of lawn tennis

== Journalists and broadcasters ==
- Rachel Barrett (1874–1953), newspaper editor and suffragette
- Gomer Berry, 1st Viscount Kemsley (1883–1968), newspaper publisher
- William Berry, 1st Viscount Camrose (1879–1954), newspaper publisher
- Jeremy Bowen (born 1960), journalist and broadcaster
- Derek Brockway (born 1967), chief meteorologist for BBC Wales Today
- Toby Charles, soccer commentator for hit PBS television show Soccer Made in Germany, 1976–1983
- Grace Coddington (born 1941), fashion journalist and stylist from Anglesey
- Hugh Cudlipp (1913–1998), editorial director of Mirror Group
- Josie d'Arby (born 1972), radio broadcaster and television presenter
- Huw Llywelyn Davies (born 1945), presenter and rugby union commentator
- Russell Davies (born 1946), radio presenter
- Huw Edwards (born 1961), journalist and co-anchor of BBC News at Ten
- Sara Edwards (born 1961), broadcast journalist and television presenter
- Dewi Griffiths (born 1931), former presenter of BBC Radio Wales' A String of Pearls
- Arfon Haines Davies (born 1948), television presenter and continuity announcer
- Guto Harri (born 1966), BBC political correspondent
- John Humphrys (born 1943), journalist and broadcaster
- Ciaran Jenkins (born 1984), journalist and broadcaster from Merthyr Tydfil
- Gareth Jones (1905–1935), first to publicise the existence of the Holodomor in the Western world
- Gareth Jones a.k.a. Gaz Top (born 1961), presenter and broadcaster
- Gethin Jones (born 1978), presenter
- Karl Jones (born 1988), BBC journalist
- Steve Jones (born 1977), presenter
- Martyn Lewis (born 1945), presenter
- Siân Lloyd (born 1958), meteorologist, former ITV weather presenter
- Sian Lloyd, broadcast journalist and BBC television news presenter
- Angus McDermid (1920–1988), BBC journalist and broadcaster
- Johnny Morris (1919–1999), television presenter of BBC's Animal Magic
- Mavis Nicholson (1930–2022), writer and TV broadcaster
- Jamie Owen (born 1967), broadcast journalist and co-anchor for BBC Wales Today
- Allison Pearson (born 1960), journalist and author
- Keidrych Rhys (1915–22 May 1987), journalist and editor of the periodical Wales
- Paul Starling (born 1951), journalist and broadcaster who worked at HTV Wales and BBC Wales before becoming political editor of the Welsh Daily Mirror
- Wynford Vaughan-Thomas (1908–1987), BBC World War II reporter and journalist
- Huw Wheldon (1916–1986), journalist and broadcaster
- Iolo Williams (born 1962), wildlife expert and presenter
- Siân Williams (born 1964), BBC news and current affairs presenter
- Lucy Owen (born 1970) television presenter and radio presenter

== Military personnel ==
- Morys Bruce, 4th Baron Aberdare, served in World War II, later active politician and Privy Councillor
- Malcolm Douglas-Pennant, 6th Baron Penrhyn (1908–2003), honoured as an MBE after the invasion of Sicily in World War II
- Rhys ap Thomas (1449–1525), Governor of Wales. Well known for killing King Richard III
- Hugh Evan-Thomas (1862–1928), Royal Navy Vice-Admiral
- Ellis Humphrey Evans ("Hedd Wyn"), a poet, died in the Third Battle of Ypres during World War I
- William Charles Fuller (1884–1974), first Welshman to be awarded the Victoria Cross during World War I
- Dafydd ap Llewelyn ap Hywel, better known as Dafydd Gam (c. 1380–1415), prominent opponent of Owain Glyndŵr
- Owain Lawgoch or Yvain de Galles (c. 1300–1378), mercenary and titular Prince of Wales
- T. E. Lawrence (Lawrence of Arabia) (1888–1935), soldier
- Hubert William Lewis (1896–1977), awarded the Victoria Cross
- John Wallace Linton, Royal Navy Commander, awarded the Victoria Cross
- Harold Lowe, merchant sailor and World War I naval officer; fifth officer and survivor of RMS Titanic
- Sir Thomas Picton (1758–1815), Lieutenant-General
- Tasker Watkins (Major) (1918–2007), first Welshman to be awarded the Victoria Cross during World War II, former president of the Welsh Rugby Union and former Lord Justice of Appeal and deputy Lord Chief Justice
- Simon Weston (born 1961), soldier and broadcaster
- John Williams (1857–1932), born John Fielding, awarded the Victoria Cross
- Roger Williams (c. 1537–1595), soldier
- Robert James Bye (1889–1962), a Welsh recipient of the Victoria Cross and Soldier in both World War I and World War II.

== Models ==
- Sian Adey-Jones (born 1957), model, 2nd runner-up Miss Universe (1976)
- Kim Ashfield (born 1959), 4th runner-up Miss World (1980)
- Amy Guy (born 1983), Miss Sport award at Miss World 2004, representing Wales, one of the Gladiators
- Rosemarie Frankland (1943–2000), Miss World (1961)
- Chloe-Beth Morgan (born 1986), Miss Wales (2008)
- Helen Morgan (born 1952), Miss World (1974)
- Kate Alicia Morgan (born 1983), model
- Sophie Moulds (born 1992), 1st runner-up Miss World 2012, representing Wales
- Kelly-Louise Pesticcio, Miss Wales (2007)
- Imogen Thomas (born 1982), Miss Wales (2003) and Big Brother contestant

== Monarchs and princes ==
- Cadwallon ap Cadfan (died 633), King of Gwynedd
- Cunedda (fl. 400–450), King of Gwynedd
- Dafydd ap Gruffudd (died 1283), Prince of Wales
- Gruffudd ap Cynan (c. 1035–1137), King of Gwynedd
- Gwenllian of Wales (1282–1337), daughter of Llywelyn ap Gruffudd
- Gwenllian ferch Gruffydd (1097–1137), Princess Consort of Deheubarth
- Henry VII of England (1457–1509), first king of the Tudor dynasty, born in Pembroke
- Hywel Dda (887–950), Prince of Deheubarth
- Idwal Iwrch (c. 650–720), King of Gwynedd
- Llywelyn the Great (1173–1240), Prince of Wales
- Llywelyn ap Gruffudd (c. 1225–1282), Llywelyn Ein Llyw Olaf (Llywelyn, Our Last Leader), Prince of Wales
- Madog ap Gruffydd Maelor (m.1236), Prince of Powys Fadog
- Maelgwn Gwynedd (c. 490–547), Prince of Gwynedd
- Owain Glyndŵr (1359–1416), Prince of Wales
- Owain Gwynedd (1100–1170), King of Gwynedd
- Rhodri Mawr (c. 820–878), King of Gwynedd and Deheubarth
- The Lord Rhys (1132–1197), Prince of Deheubarth
- Trahaearn ap Caradog (died 1081), King of Gwynedd

== Musicians ==
- Ren Gill (born 1990)
- Ivor Atkins (1869–1953), organist
- Lincoln Barrett (born 1979), aka High Contrast
- Dame Shirley Bassey (born 1937), singer
- Wally Bishop (1894–1966), 'Waldini', band leader and impresario
- James Dean Bradfield (born 1969), guitarist and lead singer (Manic Street Preachers)
- Delme Bryn-Jones (1934–2001), baritone
- Stuart Burrows (1933–2025), tenor
- Stuart Cable (1970–2010), drummer (formerly with Stereophonics)
- John Cale (born 1942), musician (formerly with The Velvet Underground)
- Phil Campbell (1961–2026), lead guitarist of Motörhead
- Charlotte Church (born 1986), singer
- Steffan Cravos (born 1975), rapper
- Henry Walford Davies (1869–1944), composer, Master of the King's Music
- Grace Gwyneddon Davies, (1878 – 1944) folk song collector
- Spencer Davis (1939–2020), musician
- Marina Diamandis (born 1985), singer-songwriter known by her stage name Marina and the Diamonds
- Aimée Ann Duffy (born 1984), singer-songwriter, stage name Duffy
- Geoff Eales, jazz pianist
- Gertrude Eaton (1864–1940), singer and co-founder of the Society of Women Musicians
- Steve Eaves (born 1952), poet, singer-songwriter
- Dave Edmunds (born 1944), singer-songwriter, musician and Rockfield Studios pioneer
- Richey Edwards (born 1967), musician (Manic Street Preachers)
- Dave Evans, former lead singer AC/DC
- Geraint Evans (1922–1992), opera singer
- Wynne Evans (born 1972), tenor, presenter and actor
- Andy Fairweather-Low (born 1948), singer, formerly with Amen Corner
- Catrin Finch (born 1980), harpist
- Roger Glover (born 1945), musician (Deep Purple)
- Larry Goves (born 1980), composer
- Jemma Griffiths (born 1975), singer-songwriter
- Pete Ham (1947–1975), musician (Badfinger)
- Alun Hoddinott (born 1929), composer
- Mary Hopkin (born 1950), singer
- Owain Arwel Hughes (born 1942), orchestral conductor
- David Russell Hulme (born 1951), conductor
- Robert ap Huw (c.1580–1665), harpist
- Greta Isaac (born 1995), alternative singer-songwriter
- Dafydd Iwan (born 1943), singer-songwriter
- Evan James (1809–1878), composed the lyrics of Hen Wlad fy Nhadau
- James James (1833–1902), harpist and musician, composed the tune of Hen Wlad fy Nhadau
- Karl Jenkins (born 1944), composer
- Katherine Jenkins (born 1980), singer
- Aled Jones (born 1970), singer, former boy treble, now baritone/tenor; also radio and TV presenter, actor
- Daniel Jones (1912–1993), composer
- Della Jones (born 1946), singer
- Gwyneth Jones (born 1936), singer
- Kelly Jones (born 1974), lead singer and guitarist (Stereophonics)
- Parry Jones (1891–1963), singer
- Tom Jones (born 1940), singer
- Martyn Joseph (born 1960), singer-songwriter
- Peter Karrie (born 1946), singer
- Cate Le Bon (born 1983), singer-songwriter
- Jon Lee (1968–2002), drummer with rock band Feeder
- Donna Lewis (born 1973), singer, musician
- Jayce Lewis (born 1984), singer-songwriter
- Lustmord (born Brian Williams), electronic musician often credited for creating the dark ambient genre
- Dai Maesmor (16th-century), harpist
- William Mathias (1934–1992), composer
- Cerys Matthews (born 1969), singer-songwriter, documentary maker, broadcaster, author
- Andrew Matthews-Owen (born 1977), pianist
- Elaine Morgan, singer
- Owen Morris (born 1968), music producer and engineer
- Grant Nicholas (born 1967), guitarist, singer with rock band Feeder
- Ivor Novello (1893–1951), actor, composer, dramatist, producer and singer
- Tessie O'Shea (1913–1995), entertainer
- Pino Palladino (born 1957), bassist
- Donald Peers (1908–1973), singer
- Mike Peters (born 1959), singer for rock band The Alarm
- Mal Pope (born 1960), singer-songwriter
- Margaret Price (born 1941), singer
- Gruff Rhys (born 1970), lead singer, songwriter, and guitarist (Super Furry Animals)
- Timothy John Rishton, organist, author, lecturer and broadcaster
- Sasha (born 1969), DJ
- Gwenno Saunders (born 1981), singer
- James Sauvage (1849–1922), singer
- Andy Scott-Lee (born 1980), singer (3SL)
- Lisa Scott-Lee (born 1975), singer (3SL and Steps)
- Harry Secombe (1921–2001), entertainer
- Chris Slade (born 1946), rock drummer with Australian Hard Rock band AC/DC
- Rick Smith (born 1959), keyboards and mixing, a member of British Electronic Group Underworld
- Sbardun (Alun Huws) (1948–2014), musician and songwriter
- David Spencer (born 1939), singer, stage name Ricky Valance
- Henry Spinetti (born 1951), drummer
- Dorothy Squires (1915–1998), singer
- Alison Statton (born 1959), singer (Young Marble Giants)
- Meic Stevens (born 1942), singer-songwriter
- Shakin' Stevens (born 1948), singer
- Steve Strange (born 1959), singer
- Robert Tear (born 1939), tenor
- Bryn Terfel (born 1965), baritone opera singer
- Thighpaulsandra (born Tim Lewis), musician, composer
- John Thomas (1826–1913), harpist and composer
- Lynda Thomas (born 1981), musician, singer-songwriter
- Mansel Thomas (1909–1986), composer
- Bonnie Tyler (1951-2026), singer
- Ian Watkins (1977–2025), lead singer for Lostprophets
- Ian Watkins (born 1976), pop singer from Steps
- Grace Williams (1906–1977), composer
- Iris Williams (1946–2025), singer
- Terry Williams (born 1948), drummer with Dire Straits
- Nicky Wire (born 1969), lyricist and bassist (Manic Street Preachers)
- Tim Wright aka. CoLD SToRAGE (born 1967), composer, singer, computer game audio
- David Wynne (1900–1983), composer

=== Bands ===
- Adwaith (2015-), Indie-rock band from Carmarthen
- The Alarm (1977–), alternative rock band from Rhyl
- Amen Corner (1966–1969), popular rock band from Cardiff
- Yr Anhrefn (1982–1995), punk rock band from Bangor
- Anweledig (1991–), funk ska band from Blaenau Ffestiniog
- Attack! Attack! (2006– ), alternative rock band from Caerphilly and Aberdare
- The Automatic (2002–), alternative rock band from Cowbridge
- Badfinger (1969–1975, 1978–1984), rock band from Swansea
- Y Bandana (2008–), alternative rock band from Caernarfon
- Big Leaves (1988–2003), indie rock band from Waunfawr
- The Blackout (2003–), post-hardcore rock band from Merthyr Tydfil
- Y Blew (1967–), Welsh language electric pop band
- Bob Delyn a'r Ebillion (1988–), folk rock band
- Brigyn (2004–), vocal group from Gwynedd
- Budgie (1967–1988, reformed 1995), heavy metal band from Cardiff
- Bullet for My Valentine (1998–), metalcore band from Bridgend
- Calan (2006–), folk band from South Wales
- Catatonia (1992–2001), alternative rock band from Cardiff
- Catfish and the Bottlemen (2007–), rock band from Llandudno
- Colorama (2008–), alternative folk band from Cardiff
- The Crocketts (1996–2002), rock group from Aberystwyth
- Crys (1976–), metal band from Resolven
- Y Cyrff (1983–1992), Welsh language rock band from Llanrwst
- Datblygu (1982–1995), experimental rock band
- Demented Are Go (1982–), psychobilly band from Cardiff
- Derwyddon Dr Gonzo (2005–), funk and ska band from Llanrug
- Dub War (1993–1999), metal band from Newport
- Ether (1996–1999), alternative rock band from Blackwood
- Feeder (1991–), rock band from Newport
- Ffa Coffi Pawb, rock band, precursor to the Super Furry Animals
- Foreign Legion (1984–), street punk band from Merthyr Tydfil
- Funeral for a Friend (2001–), screamo/emo band
- Future of the Left (2005-), alternative rock band
- Gene Loves Jezebel (1980–), gothic rock band
- Goldie Lookin Chain (b2000–), comedic rap band from Newport
- Gorky's Zygotic Mynci (1991–2006), alternative rock band from Carmarthen
- Iwcs a Doyle (1995–), acoustic band
- The Joy Formidable (2007–), alternative rock band from North Wales
- Kids in Glass Houses (2003–), pop punk band
- Llwybr Llaethog (1985–), experimental band from Blaenau
- Lostprophets (1997–2013), rock band from Pontypridd
- Lone Star (1975–1978), hard rock band from Cardiff
- Man (1968–1976, 1983–), progressive rock band
- Manic Street Preachers (1986–), alternative rock band from Blackwood
- Mclusky (1996–2005), alternative rock band
- Neck Deep (2012–), pop punk band from Wrexham
- Y Niwl (2009–), surf music instrumental band from Gwynedd
- Paper Aeroplanes (2009–2017), alternative pop band
- The Peth (2008–), rock band from Cardiff and Bethesda
- The Poppies (2003–2007), rock band from Aberystwyth
- Race Horses (2005–2013), psychedelic pop band from Aberystwyth, known as Radio Luxembourg until 2009
- Sibrydion (2004–), indie rock band from Waunfawr
- Skindred (1998–), reggae and rock band from Newport
- Stereophonics (1992–), indie rock band from Cwmaman
- Super Furry Animals (1993–), rock band from Cardiff
- Trampolene (2013–), alternative rock band from Swansea
- Tystion (1996–2002), hip-hop group from Carmarthen

== Philanthropists ==
- Gwendoline Davies (1882–1951)
- Margaret Davies (1884–1963)
- Albert Gubay (1928–2016)
- Augusta Hall, Baroness Llanover (1802–1896)
- Edmund Meyrick (1636–1713)
- Hugh Owen (1804–1881)
- Robert Owen (1771–1858)
- Thomas Phillips (1760–1851)
- Eliezer Pugh (1814–1903)
- Edwin Stevens (1905–1995)
- Maria Jane Williams (c.1794–1873)
- John Wynne (1650–1714)
- Elihu Yale (1649–1721)

== Philosophers ==
- Richard Ithamar Aaron (1901–1987)
- Martyn Evans
- David James Jones (1886–1947)
- Henry Jones (1852–1922)
- John Robert Jones (1911–1970)
- Hywel Lewis (1910–1992)
- John Lewis (1889–1976)
- Gwilym Ellis Lane Owen (1922–1982)
- Dewi Zephaniah Phillips (1934–2006)
- Griffith Powell (1561–1620)
- John Cowper Powys (1872–1963)
- H. H. Price (1899–1984)
- Richard Price (1723–1791)
- Mark Rowlands (born 1962)
- Bertrand Russell (1872–1970)
- David Oswald Thomas (1924–2005)
- Thomas Vaughan (1621–1666)
- David Williams (1738–1816)
- Rheinallt Nantlais Williams (1911–1993)

== Politicians ==
- William Abraham (1842–1922), Liberal–Labour and Labour, trade unionist and first working-class MP
- Leo Abse (1917–2008), Labour reformer of social legislation
- Leighton Andrews AM (born 1957), Labour, Minister in the Welsh Government
- Ifor Bach (fl. 1158), early Welsh leader
- Kenneth Baker (born 1934), Conservative
- Lorraine Barrett AM (born 1950), Labour
- John Batchelor (1820–1883), Liberal
- Aneurin Bevan (1897–1960), Labour, founder of the National Health Service
- Henry Bruce (1815–1895), Liberal
- Julian Cayo-Evans (1937–1995), political activist and leader of the Free Wales Army
- Christine Chapman AM (born 1956), Labour
- John Cutt (1613–1681), Puritan colonial politician in New England
- Alun Davies MS (born 1964), Labour
- Andrew Davies AM (born 1952), Labour
- David Davies, 1st Baron Davies (1880–1944), Liberal
- Jocelyn Davies AM (born 1959), Plaid Cymru
- Rob Davies, South African Minister of Trade and Industries
- S. O. Davies (1886–1972), Labour
- Dafydd Elis-Thomas (born 1946), Plaid Cymru, former Presiding Officer of the National Assembly for Wales
- Gwynfor Evans (1912–2005), Plaid Cymru's first Member of Parliament
- Nerys Evans AM (born 1980), Plaid Cymru
- Nigel Evans MP Conservative Member of Parliament
- Chris Franks AM (born 1951), Plaid Cymru
- John Frost (1784–1877), Chartist
- Julia Gillard (born 1961), first female Prime Minister of Australia and leader of the Australian Labor Party
- Janice Gregory AM (born 1955), Labour
- Samuel Griffith (1845–1920), first Chief Justice of Australia
- Jim Griffiths (1890–1975), first Secretary of State for Wales
- John Griffiths MS (born 1956), Labour and Counsel General for Wales
- Lesley Griffiths MS (born 1960), Labour
- Benjamin Hall, 1st Baron Llanover (1802–1867), Whig, after whom Big Ben is reputedly named
- Edwina Hart AM (born 1957), Labour
- Michael Heseltine (born 1933), Conservative
- Geoffrey Howe (1926 - 2015), Conservative, Foreign Secretary
- Billy Hughes (1862–1952), Prime Minister of Australia
- Cledwyn Hughes (Baron Cledwyn of Penrhos) (1916–2001), Labour
- Jane Hutt MS (born 1949), Labour
- Huw Irranca-Davies MS(born 1963), Labour
- Irene James AM (born 1952), Labour
- Bethan Jenkins AM (born 1981), Plaid Cymru
- Roy Jenkins (1920–2003), Labour, Chancellor of the Exchequer 1967–70, founder of the Social Democratic Party (SDP), President of the European Commission, 1976–81 and author
- Alun Ffred Jones AM (born 1949), Plaid Cymru
- Ann Jones MS (born 1953), Labour
- Carwyn Jones MS (born 1967), Labour, First Minister of Wales
- Charles William Jones (1836–1908), Welsh politician and magistrate
- Elin Jones MS (born 1966), Plaid Cymru
- Baron Elwyn-Jones (1909–1989), Labour Lord Chancellor also barrister
- Ieuan Wyn Jones AM (born 1949), Plaid Cymru, Deputy First Minister of Wales
- William Jones (1809–1873), Chartist
- Neil Kinnock (born 1942), Leader of the Labour Party, 1983–92
- Peter Law (1948–2006), Labour, Independent
- Francis Lewis (1713–1802), signatory of the United States Declaration of Independence
- Huw Lewis AM (born 1964), Labour
- Rose Mabel Lewis (1853–1928), leader of the Cardiff and District Women's Suffrage Society
- Saunders Lewis (1893–1985), poet, dramatist, historian, literary critic, political activist, Welsh nationalist and a founder of what would become Plaid Cymru
- Val Lloyd AM, Labour
- David Lloyd George (1863–1945), Liberal, Prime Minister 1916–22
- Sandy Mewies AM (born 1950), Labour
- Alun Michael (born 1943), Labour, first First Secretary for Wales 1999–2000
- Rhodri Morgan AM (1939–2017), Labour, First Minister of Wales 2000–2009
- Paul Murphy, Baron Murphy of Torfaen (born 1946), Labour, Secretary of State for Northern Ireland 2002–05
- Lynne Neagle MS (born 1968), Labour
- Ifan ab Owen Edwards (1895–1970), founder of Urdd Gobaith Cymru
- Richard Lewis, better known as Dic Penderyn (1808–1831), Chartist
- John Prescott (born 1938), Labour, Deputy Prime Minister 1997–2007
- Merlyn Rees (1920–2006), Labour, Secretary of State for Northern Ireland 1974–1976, Home Secretary 1976–1979
- Henry Richard (1812–1888), Liberal
- Ivor Richard, Baron Richard, Labour, former Leader of the House of Lords, Lord Privy Seal and European Commissioner
- Edward V. Robertson (1881–1963), U.S. Senator
- Ted Rowlands (born 1943), Labour
- Joan Ruddock (born 1943), Labour
- Carl Sargeant AM (born 1968), Labour
- Molly Scott Cato (born 1963), Green Party MEP and green economist
- Karen Sinclair AM (born 1952), Labour
- George Thomas (1909–1997), Labour, Speaker of the House of Commons
- Lewis Valentine (1893–1986), pastor, author, editor, Welsh nationalist and a founder of what would become Plaid Cymru
- Thomas Vaughan (c.1410–1483), also soldier and diplomat
- Dafydd Wigley (born 1943), former president of Plaid Cymru
- D. J. Williams (1885–1970), Welsh-language writer and a founder of what would become Plaid Cymru
- Morgan B. Williams (1831–1903), Republican member of the U.S. House of Representatives
- William Williams (1634–1700), also lawyer
- Zephaniah Williams (1795–1874), Chartist
- Leanne Wood MS (born 1971), Plaid Cymru party leader
- Alan Woods (born 1944), Trotskyist and writer
- Dai Lloyd MS (born 1956), Plaid Cymru politician and GP

== Religious figures ==
- Saint Cadoc (born c. 497)
- Thomas Charles (1755–1814), Nonconformist minister
- Bishop Peter Collins (born 1958), Bishop-Elect of East Anglia
- Thomas Dafydd, hymn-writer
- Saint David (died 601?), patron saint of Wales
- David Davies (1741–1819), clergyman and social historian
- Reverend John Davies (Shon Gymro) (1804–1884), Welsh Congregational Minister, linguist, writer and poet
- Elfodd (died 809) Welsh bishop
- Samuel Ifor Enoch (1914–2001), Principal of the United Theological College, Aberystwyth
- Christmas Evans (1766–1838), Nonconformist minister
- Saints Philip Evans and John Lloyd, Roman Catholic priests and two of the Forty Martyrs of England and Wales
- Ann Griffiths (1776–1805), religious poet and hymn-writer
- David Griffiths (1792–1863), missionary to Madagascar, translator of the first Bible written in an African language
- Saint Richard Gwyn (c.1537–1584)
- Howell Harris (1714–1773), Methodist minister
- Saint Illtud (died mid-6th century)
- Bishop William Morgan (1545–1604), translator of the first complete Bible in Welsh (1588)
- Saint Patrick, patron saint of Ireland
- Alwyn Rice Jones (1934–2007), Bishop of St Asaph and also Archbishop of Wales
- Thomas Richards (priest) (c. 1687–1760), Anglican priest and canon of St Asaph's Cathedral
- Evan Roberts (1878–1951), Methodist preacher in the Welsh Revival
- John Roberts (Ieuan Gwyllt) (1822–1877), Methodist preacher and hymn-writer
- Daniel Rowland (1713–1790), Methodist preacher in the Welsh Revival
- William Salesbury (c. 1520–1584?), Welsh translator of the New Testament
- John Tudno Williams (born 1938), Moderator of the Presbyterian Church of Wales 2006–7
- Rheinallt Nantlais Williams (1911–1993), Principal of the United Theological College, Aberystwyth
- Rowan Williams (born 1950), Archbishop of Canterbury from 2003 to 2012
- William Richard Williams (1896–1962), Principal of the United Theological College, Aberystwyth
- William Williams Pantycelyn (1717–1791), hymn-writer

== Scientists ==
- Glyn Daniel (1914–1986), archaeologist, broadcaster
- Donald Watts Davies (1924–2000), "father of the internet"; co-inventor of packet switching (and originator of the term)
- Hugh Davies (1793–1821), botanist, clergyman
- Huw Dixon (born 1958), economist
- Lyn Evans (born 1945), project leader of the CERN, Switzerland-based Large Hadron Collider
- Herbert George (1893–1939), chemist, lecturer
- William Robert Grove (1811–1896), physicist
- Gwilym Jenkins (1933–1982), statistician, systems engineer
- Alwyn Jones (born 1947), biophysicist
- Eifion Jones (1925–2004), marine botanist
- Emrys Jones (1920–2006), geographer
- Steve Jones (born 1944), biologist, geneticist, author and television presenter
- William Jones (1675–1749), mathematician
- Brian David Josephson (born 1940), physicist, Nobel Laureate, inventor of the Josephson junction
- Edward Lhuyd (1660–1709), naturalist, botanist, linguist, geographer and antiquary
- Ronald Lockley (1903–2000), naturalist, author
- Victor Erle Nash-Williams, archaeologist
- Robert Recorde (1510–1558), mathematician and physician; inventor of the 'equals' sign in mathematics
- Gareth Roberts (1940–2007), physicist
- Graham Sutton (1903–1977), meteorologist
- Mary Gladys Thoday (1884–1943), botanist, suffragist and peace activist
- Llewellyn Hilleth Thomas (1903–1992), physicist; discoverer of the 'Thomas precession' in relativity theory
- John Meurig Thomas (1932–2020), chemist
- Phil Williams (1939–2003), astrophysicist, politician

== Sports people ==
=== Athletes ===
- John Ainsworth-Davis (1895–1976), gold medallist at the 1920 Summer Olympics
- Jim Alford (1913–2004), British Empire Games gold medallist
- Steve Barry (born 1950), Commonwealth Games gold medallist
- Jamie Baulch (born 1973), 400m sprinter, Commonwealth Games bronze and silver medallist and silver medallist at the 1996 Summer Olympics
- Tim Benjamin (born 1982), Commonwealth Games silver medallist
- Steve Brace (born 1961), long-distance runner
- Guto Nyth Brân (1700–1737), runner
- Lesley Brannan (born 1976), hammer thrower
- Lynn Davies (born 1942), Olympic gold medallist
- Tenby Davies (1884–1932), world professional half-mile champion
- John Disley (born 1928), 3000 metres steeple chaser
- Dai Greene (born 1986)
- Tanni Grey-Thompson (born 1969), winner of 11 gold, four silver and one bronze Olympic medals
- Cecil Griffiths (1901–1945), gold medallist at the 1920 Summer Olympics
- Venissa Head (born 1956), Commonwealth Games silver medallist
- Colin Jackson (born 1967), hurdler
- David Jacobs (1888–1976), gold medallist at the 1912 Summer Olympics
- Berwyn Jones (1940–2007), sprinter and rugby league footballer
- Steve Jones (born 1955), Commonwealth Games silver medallist and former marathon world record holder
- Christian Malcolm (born 1979), sprinter
- Robert Mitchell (born 1980), high jumper
- Kay Morley-Brown (born 1963), Commonwealth Games gold medallist
- Catherine Murphy (born 1975), Olympic 400m runner
- Jonathon O'Dougherty, British National Ice Dance champion
- Carys Parry (born 1981), Commonwealth Games hammer silver medallist
- Berwyn Price (born 1951), Commonwealth Games gold and silver medallist, and Olympic 110-metre hurdler
- Tom Richards (1910–1985), silver medallist at the 1948 Summer Olympics
- Philippa Roles (born 1978), Commonwealth Games discus thrower
- Michelle Scutt (born 1960), Commonwealth Games silver medallist and bronze medallist at the 1980 Summer Olympics
- Steven Shalders (born 1981 in Bridgend), Commonwealth Games triple jumper
- Tony Simmons (born 1948), Olympic 10,000-metre runner
- Scott Simpson (born 1979), Commonwealth Games pole vaulter
- Iwan Thomas (born 1974), 400m sprinter
- Reg Thomas (1907–1946), British Empire Games gold and silver medallist, and Olympic distance runner
- Angela Tooby (born 1960), Commonwealth Games bronze medallist
- Susan Tooby (born 1960), Olympic long-distance runner
- Hayley Tullett (born 1975), Commonwealth Games silver and bronze medallist, and Olympic middle-distance runner
- Kirsty Wade (born 1962), Commonwealth Games gold medallist, and Olympic middle-distance runner
- Nigel Walker (born 1963), Olympic 110m high hurdler and Wales international rugby union player
- Nick Whitehead (1933–2002), Commonwealth Games bronze medallist and bronze medallist at the 1960 Summer Olympics
- J.J. Williams (born 1948), Commonwealth Games sprinter and Wales international rugby union player
- Rhys Williams (born 1984), Commonwealth Games bronze medallist
- Neil Winter (born 1973), Commonwealth Games gold medallist, Olympic pole vaulter

=== Badminton ===
- Martyn Lewis (born 1982)
- Kelly Morgan (born 1975)
- Richard Vaughan (born 1978)

=== Baseball players ===
- Jimmy Austin (1879–1965)
- Ted Lewis (1872–1936)
- Peter Morris (1854–1884)

=== Basketball players ===
- Tal Dunne (born 1987), Welsh-born Israeli professional basketball player for Israeli team Ironi Nes Ziona

=== British baseball players ===
- Ted Peterson (1916–2005)
- George Whitcombe (1902–1986)

=== Bowls ===
- Janet Ackland
- Fred Leamon (1919–1981)
- Fred Parfitt (1869–1953)
- Robert Weale (born 1963)

=== Boxers ===
- Jamie Arthur (born 1979)
- Eddie Avoth (born 1945)
- Albert Barnes (1913–1990)
- Bill Beynon (1891–1932)
- Dai Bowen (died 1912, in the sinking of the RMS Titanic)
- Joe Calzaghe (born 1972), undefeated former WBO, WBA, WBC, IBF super middleweight and The Ring light heavyweight world champion
- Nathan Cleverly (born 1987), former European light heavyweight title holder
- Jason Cook (born 1975)
- Brian Curvis (born 1937)
- Dai Dower (born 1933)
- Jim Driscoll (1880–1925), 'Peerless' Jim Driscoll, featherweight
- Joe Erskine (1934–1990)
- Tommy Farr (1914–1986)
- Scott Gammer (born 1976)
- Colin Jones (born 1959)
- Enzo Maccarinelli (born 1980), former WBU cruiserweight title holder (7 defences)
- Johnny Owen (1956–1980)
- David 'Bomber' Pearce (1959–2000)
- Nicky Piper (born 1966)
- Steve Robinson (born 1968), former WBO featherweight world title holder (7 defences)
- Lee Selby (born 1987), IBF featherweight champion
- Joe Cordina (born 1991), undefeated two time IBF super featherweight champion
- Tom Thomas (1880–1911), first British middleweight champion
- Freddie Welsh (1886–1927)
- Jimmy Wilde (1892–1969)
- Howard Winstone (1939–2000)

=== Cricketers ===
- Robert Croft (born 1970)
- Alan Jones (born 1938)
- Jeff Jones (born 1941)
- Simon Jones (born 1978)
- Tony Lewis (born 1938), England Captain 1972/73
- Steve Watkin (born 1964)

=== Cyclists ===
- Jessica Allen (born 1989)
- Dale Appleby (born 1986)
- Elinor Barker (born 1994)
- Yanto Barker (born 1980)
- Reg Braddick (1913–1999)
- Kara Chesworth (born 1972)
- Craig Cooke (born 1984)
- Nicole Cooke (born 1983)
- Katie Curtis (born 1988)
- Nina Davies (born 1974)
- Paul Esposti (born 1972)
- Alex Greenfield (born 1990)
- Clare Greenwood (born 1958)
- Sam Harrison (born 1992)
- Anneliese Heard (born 1981)
- Sally Hodge (born 1966)
- Megan Hughes (born 1977)
- Ellen Hunter (born 1968)
- Joby Ingram-Dodd (born 1980)
- Becky James (born 1991)
- Ian Jeremiah (born c. 1970)
- Louise Jones (born 1963)
- Luc Jones (born 1991)
- Sion Jones (born 1979)
- Colin Lewis (born 1942)
- Arthur Linton (1868–1896)
- Anthony Malarczyk (born 1975)
- Jimmy Michael (1877–1904)
- Ruby Miller (born 1992)
- Jon Mould (born 1991)
- Rob Partridge (born 1986)
- Steve Paulding
- Matt Postle (born 1970)
- Roger Pratt (born 1944)
- Huw Pritchard (born 1976)
- Dave Rand (born 1973)
- Ross Reid (born 1987)
- Simon Richardson (born 1966)
- Luke Rowe (born 1990)
- Matthew Rowe (born 1988)
- Paul Sheppard (born 1978)
- Don Skene (born 1936)
- Eddie Smart (1946–2000)
- Geraint Thomas (born 1986)
- Finlay Tarling (born 2006)
- Chris Williams
- Julian Winn (born 1972)
- Will Wright (born 1973)

=== Equestrians ===
- David Broome (born 1940)
- David Harrison (born 1972)
- Geoff Lewis (born 1935)
- Richard Meade (born 1936)

=== Footballers ===
- Mark Aizlewood (born 1959)
- Ivor Allchurch (1929–1997), Wales international
- Len Allchurch (1933–2016)
- Dai Astley (1909–1989)
- Colin Baker (1934–2021)
- Tom Baker (born 1934)
- Gareth Bale (born 1989)
- Tommy Bamford (1905–1967)
- Walley Barnes (1920–1975)
- Craig Bellamy (born 1979), striker and Wales international
- Nathan Blake (born 1972)
- Horace Blew (1873–1957)
- Paul Bodin (born 1964)
- Dave Bowen (1928–1995)
- Jason Bowen (born 1972)
- Mark Bowen (born 1963)
- Stan Bowsher (1899–1968)
- Terry Boyle (born 1958)
- Ronnie Burgess (1917–2005)
- Ollie Burton (born 1941)
- John Charles (1931–2004), the "Gentle Giant", Wales international
- Mel Charles (1935–2016)
- Roy Clarke (1925–2006)
- Chris Coleman (born 1970)
- James Collins (born 1983)
- John Cornforth (born 1967)
- Vic Crowe (1932–2009)
- Alan Curtis (born 1954)
- Ben Davies (born 1993)
- Len Davies (1899–1945)
- Ron Davies (born 1942)
- Wyn Davies (born 1942)
- Mark Delaney (born 1976)
- Robert Earnshaw (born 1981)
- Trevor Edwards (born 1937)
- John Elsworthy (1931–2009)
- John Emanuel (born 1948)
- Mike England (born 1941)
- Carl Fletcher (born 1980)
- Brian Flynn (born 1955)
- Trevor Ford (1923–2003)
- Roger Freestone (born 1968)
- Danny Gabbidon (born 1979)
- Ryan Giggs (born 1973), midfielder/winger, Wales international
- David Giles (born 1956)
- Brian Godfrey (born 1940)
- Arfon Griffiths (born 1941)
- Chris Gunter (born 1989)
- Carl Harris (born 1956)
- John Hartson (born 1975)
- Terry Hennessey (born 1942)
- Wayne Hennessey (born 1987)
- Ron Hewitt (1928–2001)
- Barrie Hole (1942–2019)
- Mel Hopkins (1934–2010)
- Barry Horne (born 1962)
- Billy Hughes (1918–1981)
- Mark Hughes (born 1963), former international and Wales manager
- Joe Jacobson (born 1986), left back (Oldham Athletic and U21 national team)
- Leighton James (born 1953)
- Robbie James (1957–1998)
- Steve Jenkins (born 1972)
- Roy John (1911–1973)
- Bryn Jones (1912–1985)
- Cliff Jones (born 1935)
- Jack Jones
- Joey Jones (born 1955)
- Ken Jones (1936–2013)
- Fred Keenor (1894–1972)
- Jack Kelsey (1929–1992)
- Andy King (born 1988)
- George Latham (1881–1939)
- Joe Ledley (born 1987)
- Ken Leek (1935–2007)
- Andy Legg (born 1966)
- Arthur Lever (1920–2004)
- John Lewis (born 1955)
- Steve Lowndes (born 1960)
- Billy Lucas (1918–1998)
- Chris Marustik (born 1961)
- Terry Medwin (born 1932)
- Andy Melville (born 1968)
- Billy Meredith (1874–1958)
- Kenny Morgans (1939–2012), survivor of the Munich air disaster
- Jimmy Murphy (1910–1989)
- Lewin Nyatanga (born 1988)
- Eddie Parris (1911–1971), first black player to play for Wales
- Mark Pembridge (born 1970)
- Jason Perry (born 1970)
- Leighton Phillips (born 1949)
- Ivor Powell (1916–2012)
- Keith Pring (born 1943)
- Tony Pulis (born 1958), manager of West Bromwich Albion
- Aaron Ramsey (born 1990)
- Kevin Ratcliffe (born 1960)
- Gil Reece (born 1942)
- Mel Rees (1967–1993)
- Ronnie Rees (born 1944)
- Stan Richards (1917–1987)
- Sam Ricketts (born 1981)
- Osian Roberts, assistant manager of Wales
- Carl Robinson (born 1976)
- John Robinson (born 1971)
- Peter Rodrigues (born 1944)
- Ian Rush (born 1961), Liverpool F.C.'s record goal-scorer and Wales international
- Dean Saunders (born 1964)
- Robbie Savage (born 1974)
- Alf Sherwood (1923–1990)
- Neville Southall (born 1959), goalkeeper, Wales' most capped player
- Gary Speed (1969–2011), Wales international footballer
- Gary Sprake (born 1945)
- Fred Stansfield (1917–2014)
- Byron Stevenson (1956–2007), Leeds United F.C., Birmingham City F.C. player and Wales international
- Derek Sullivan (1930–1983)
- Kit Symons (born 1971)
- Derek Tapscott (1932–2008)
- Billy Thomas (1903–1991)
- Rod Thomas (born 1947)
- John Toshack (born 1949), former Wales and Liverpool international and National Team manager
- Nigel Vaughan (born 1959)
- Graham Vearncombe (1934–1993)
- Roy Vernon (1937–1993)
- Tony Villars (born 1952)
- Colin Webster (1932–2001)
- George Whitcombe (1902–1986)
- Harold Williams (1924–2014)
- Stuart Williams (1930–2013)
- Doug Witcomb (1918–1999)
- Terry Yorath (born 1950)

=== Golfers ===
- Paul Affleck (born 1966)
- Errie Ball (1910–2014)
- Sion Bebb (born 1968)
- Becky Brewerton (born 1982)
- Simon Cox (born 1952)
- Karen Davies (born 1965)
- Rhys Davies (born 1985)
- Stephen Dodd (born 1966)
- Jamie Donaldson (born 1975)
- Bradley Dredge (born 1973)
- Brian Huggett (1936−2024)
- Richard Johnson (born 1972)
- David Llewellyn (born 1951)
- Becky Morgan (born 1974)
- Mark Mouland (born 1961)
- David Park (born 1974)
- Philip Parkin (born 1961)
- Eleanor Pilgrim (born 1977)
- Mark Pilkington (born 1978)
- Phillip Price (born 1966)
- Dai Rees (1913–1983)
- Dave Thomas (1934–2013)
- Helen Wadsworth (born 1964)
- Ian Woosnam (born 1958), Ryder Cup player and former U.S. Masters champion

=== Field hockey ===
- Sarah Thomas (born 1981), Olympic bronze medallist

=== Motor sports ===
- Caleb McDuff (born 2008), GT driver
- Tom Cave (born 1991), rally driver
- Chaz Davies (born 1987), motorcycle racer
- Elfyn Evans (born 1989), rally driver
- Gwyndaf Evans (born 1959), rally driver
- Nicky Grist (born 1961), rally co-driver
- Gary Hocking (1937–1962), motorcycle racer
- Karl Jones (born 1959), BTCC driver
- Mark Jones (born 1979), motocross rider
- Cyril Kieft (1911–2004), racing car manufacturer and driver
- Jackie Lewis (born 1936), Formula One racing driver
- David Llewellin (born 1960), rally driver
- Hywel Lloyd (born 1985), Formula Three racing driver
- Ian Lougher (born 1963), motorcycle racer
- Charlie Martin (1913–1998), Grand Prix racing driver
- Phil Mills (born 1963), rally co-driver
- Phil Morris (born 1975), speedway rider
- J. G. Parry-Thomas (1884–1927), racing driver and one time Land Speed Record holder
- Tom Pryce (1949–1977), Formula One racing driver
- Alan Rees (born 1938), Formula One racing driver
- Gareth Rees (born 1969), former racing driver and motorsport commentator
- David Richards (born 1952), former rally co-driver and team principal of the BAR and Benetton Formula One teams
- Jamie Smyth (born 1976), racing driver
- Malcolm Uphill (d. 1999), Grand Prix motorcycle road racer
- Freddie Williams (1926–2013), former Speedway World Champion

=== Rowers ===
- Katrina Jacks (c. 1986–2010)
- Tom James (born 1984)
- Tom Lucy (born 1988)

=== Rugby players ===
This list includes league, female and uncapped players

- Lee Beach (born 1982), captained Wales' world cup winning sevens team (Dubai 2009)
- Billy Boston (born 1934), international (rugby league)
- Kevin Bowring, former Wales national team coach
- Non Evans (born 1975), also competed for Wales at judo, weightlifting and freestyle wrestling
- Trevor Foster (1916–2005), international (rugby league)
- Lewis Jones (born 1931), international (rugby league)
- Rob Lewis (born 1987), Wales under 18, 19 and 20 and sevens player
- Alun Wyn Jones, current captain of Wales and the Ospreys (rugby union)
- Mike Powell (born 1978)
- Jo Price (born 1985), rugby union player and former footballer
- Mike Ruddock (born 1959), former Wales national team coach
- Frank Shugars, international (rugby league)
- Clive Sullivan (born 1943), international (rugby league)
- Aled Thomas (born 1985), Wales under 17, 18, 19 and 21 and sevens player
- Gwyn Thomas, international (rugby league)
- Alex Walker (born 1986), former Newport Gwent Dragons player
- Frank Whitcombe, international (rugby league), Lance Todd trophy winner
- Lenny Woodard (born 1976), international (rugby union: non–test) (rugby league)
- Frank Young, international (rugby league)

=== Snooker players ===
- Dominic Dale (born 1971)
- Ryan Day (born 1980)
- Terry Griffiths (born 1947)
- Jamie Jones (born 1988)
- Darren Morgan (born 1966)
- Doug Mountjoy (born 1942)
- Ray Reardon (born 1932)
- Matthew Stevens (born 1977)
- Mark Williams (born 1975)
- Cliff Wilson (1934–1994)

=== Sport shooters ===
- Johanne Brekke
- Ceri Dallimore
- Sarah Wixey (born 1970)

=== Surfers ===
- Carwyn Williams (born 1965)

=== Swimmers ===
- David Davies (born 1985)
- Valerie Davies (1912–2001)
- Julie Gould (born 1989)
- Thomas Haffield (born 1988)
- Nyree Lewis (born 1980)
- Jemma Lowe (born 1990)
- Paul Radmilovic (1886–1968), swimmer and water-polo player
- David Roberts (born 1980)
- Irene Steer (1889–1947)
- Lowri Tynan (born 1987)
- Martyn Woodroffe (born 1950)

=== Weightlifters ===
- David Morgan (born 1964), three times Olympian, three times masters world champion and holder of three world records

=== Wrestlers ===
- Mark 'Mandrews' Andrews (born 1992)
- Sandy Orford (1911–1986)
- Mason Ryan (born 1982)
- Adrian Street (born 1940)
- Rob Terry (born 1980)
- Don Vines (1932–1989)
- Orig Williams (1931–2009)

== Trade union leaders ==
- William Abraham (1842–1922), also known as Mabon
- William Brace (1865–1947)
- Moss Evans (1925–2002)
- Jim Griffiths (1890–1975)
- Vernon Hartshorn (1872–1931)
- Arthur Horner (1894–1968)
- Clive Jenkins (1926–1999)
- Will Paynter (1903–1984)
- Thomas Richards (1859–1931)
- James Henry Thomas (1874–1949)
- Huw T. Edwards (1892–1970)

== Writers ==
For Welsh writers, see:

- List of Welsh writers
- List of Welsh language authors
- List of Welsh language poets (6th century to c.1600)
- List of Welsh women writers

== Other notables ==
- Helen Adams (born 1978), runner-up in Big Brother 2 (2001)
- Delyth Badder, folklorist, writer and the world's first Welsh-speaking consultant paediatric and perinatal pathologist
- Thomas William Barker (1861–1912), solicitor
- Seymour Berry, 1st Baron Buckland (1877–1928), industrialist
- Michael Bogdanov (1938–2017), theatre director
- E. G. Bowen (1900–1983), geographer
- Betsi Cadwaladr (1789–1860), Crimean War nurse
- CDawgVA (Connor Marc Colquhoun), (born 1996), YouTuber, voice actor, and philanthropist
- Gwladys ferch Dafydd Gam (d. 1454), Seren y Fenni (Star of Abergavenny)
- Rees Davies (1938–2005), historian
- John Dee (1527–1608 or 1609), mathematician, astronomer, alchemist and adviser to Elizabeth I
- Samuel Ifor Enoch (1914–2001), theologian
- Anne Grey, Baroness Hussey (1490–1545), noblewoman and attendant to Mary Tudor, Queen of England
- Piers Griffith (1568–1628), pirate
- John Gwenogvryn Evans (1852–1930), palaeographic expert
- Timothy John Evans (1924–1950), hanged for the murder of wife and daughter, due to a miscarriage of justice, but posthumously pardoned
- Geoffrey of Monmouth (c.1100–1155), churchman and historian
- Peter Havard-Williams (1922–1995), librarian educator
- George Jeffreys, 1st Baron Jeffreys (1648–1689), hanging judge
- Alfred Lewis Jones (1845–1909), ship-owner and businessman
- Ernest Jones (1879–1958), psychoanalyst
- John Geoffrey Jones (1928–2014), judge, tribunal president and chairman
- Percy Mansell Jones (1889–1968), professor of French literature and history
- Walter Map (c.1137–1209), medieval raconteur
- Howard Marks (1945−2016), drug smuggler and author
- Angus McBean (1904–1990), photographer
- Godfrey Morgan, 1st Viscount Tredegar (1831–1913), Member of Parliament, land-owner and benefactor
- Henry Morgan (c.1635–1688), privateer
- Edward Williams (1747–1826), a.k.a. Iolo Morganwg, antiquarian
- Mary Morris (1873–1925), doctor and suffragist
- Marcus Piggott (born 1971), fashion photographer, half of duo Mert and Marcus
- James Price (1917–2005), civil engineer, mathematician and author
- Dr William Price (1800–1893), eccentric physician
- Arwel Richards (born 1982), columnist and businessman
- Bartholomew Roberts (1682–1722), pirate (Black Bart or Barti Ddu)
- William Salesbury (c.1520–c.1600), lexicographer, phonetician and comparative linguist
- James Sommerin (born c. 1978), chef
- John Tabatabai (born 1987), professional poker player
- Robert Vaughan (c.1592–16 May 1667), antiquary
- Bryn Williams (born 1977), chef
- John Tudno Williams (born 1938), theologian
- William Richard Williams (1896–1962), theologian
- Thomas Wynne (1627–1691), surgeon, Quaker and friend of William Penn
- Mike Young (born 1945), TV producer
- Andrew House (born 1965), President and Group CEO of Sony Computer Entertainment (2011–2017)

== See also ==
- 100 Welsh Heroes
- Canadians of Welsh descent
- List of people by nationality
- List of Welsh Americans
- List of Welsh women
- Welsh American
- Welsh Australian
- Welsh Chilean
- Welsh Italians
- Welsh peers and baronets
- Y Wladfa
