= Wales at the 2010 Commonwealth Games =

- CG code: WAL
- CGA: Commonwealth Games Council for Wales
- Website: teamwales.net

in Delhi, India
- Competitors: 175 in 15 sports
- Flag bearers: Opening: David Davies; Closing: Rob Weale
- Medals Ranked 13th: Gold 3 Silver 6 Bronze 10 Total 19

Commonwealth Games appearances (overview)
- 1930; 1934; 1938; 1950; 1954; 1958; 1962; 1966; 1970; 1974; 1978; 1982; 1986; 1990; 1994; 1998; 2002; 2006; 2010; 2014; 2018; 2022; 2026; 2030

2010 Commonwealth Games official logo.

Almost 175 athletes across 15 different sports competed for Wales at the 2010 Commonwealth Games in Delhi, India, between 3 October and 14 October 2010.

In order to send a team to the 2010 Commonwealth Games, Wales needed to raise £500,000. For this the Commonwealth Games Council for Wales established a scheme called the Friends of Commonwealth Games in Wales, in which individuals and small businesses could contribute a minimum of £1000 in the four years leading up to the Commonwealth Games. The funding issues resulted in no team being selected for the squash events.

The Queen's Baton toured Wales, beginning in north Wales on 9 November 2009, and going on to mid and west Wales on 10 November and to south Wales on 11 November.

The chef de mission for the Welsh team was Chris Jenkins whilst the overall team captain was weightlifter Michaela Breeze. Of the original selections only cyclist Geraint Thomas (health issues) and decathlete David Guest (injury) did not travel to Delhi.

Jazmin Carlin and Becky James were the only team members to win more than one medal. Each won a silver and a bronze. In his seventh Commonwealth Games appearance bowls player Rob Weale won his second gold medal, his first having been 24 years earlier in 1986.

The medals won in Delhi raised Wales' all-time medal tally at the Commonwealth Games to 235 (52 gold, 76 silver, 107 bronze).

== Medals ==
	(gold)	(silver)	(bronze)	Total
Wales	3	6	10	19

== Medalists ==
Medal	Name	Sport	Event	Date
Gold	Dai Greene	Athletics	Men's 400 m hurdles	10 October
Gold	Robert Weale	Lawn bowls	Men's singles	13 October
Gold	Sean McGoldrick	Boxing	Bantamweight	13 October
Silver	Jazmin Carlin	Aquatics	Women's 200 m freestyle	5 October
Silver	Carys Parry	Athletics	Women's Hammer Throw	6 October
Silver	Becky James	Cycling	Women's sprint	7 October
Silver	Michaela Breeze	Weightlifting	Women's 63 kg	7 October
Silver	Jenny McLoughlin	Athletics	Women's 100 m T37	8 October
Silver	Francesca Jones	Gymnastics	Women's rhythmic individual hoop	14 October
Bronze	Becky James	Cycling	Women's 500 m Time Trial	5 October
Bronze	Jemma Lowe	Aquatics	Women's 100 m Butterfly	7 October
Bronze	Jazmin Carlin	Aquatics	Women's 400 m freestyle	7 October
Bronze	Georgia Davies	Aquatics	Women's 50 m backstroke	7 October
Bronze	Christian Malcolm	Athletics	Men's 200 m	10 October
Bronze	Rhys Williams	Athletics	Men's 400 m hurdles	10 October
Bronze	Anwen Butten & Hannah Smith	Lawn bowls	Women's pairs	11 October
Bronze	Keiron Harding	Boxing	Middleweight (75 kg)	11 October
Bronze	Jermaine Asare	Boxing	Light Heavyweight (81 kg)	11 October
Bronze	Johanne Brekke	Shooting	Women's 50-metre rifle prone singles	12 October

== Events and team ==
=== Aquatics ===
Aquatics Medal Tally

Gold	Silver	Bronze	TOTAL
0	1	3	4

==== Swimming ====
Team Wales consists of 16 swimmers.

Men

Event	Swimmer(s)	Heats		Semi Finals		Final	
Event	Swimmer(s)	Result	Rank	Result	Rank	Result	Rank
100 Freestyle	Ieuan Lloyd	51.44	15 Q	51.09	16	DNQ	
200 m Freestyle	Ieuan Lloyd	1.50,83	15	DNQ		DNQ	
400 m Freestyle	Ieuan Lloyd	3:54.57	10	DNQ		DNQ	
400 m Freestyle	David Davies	3:51.47	2 Q			3:50.52	4
1500 Freestyle	David Davies	15:38.59	6 Q			15:20.38	5
1500 Freestyle	Thomas Haffield	N/A	DNS			'	'
50 m Backstroke	Marco Loughran	25.62	4 Q	25.43	4 Q	25.58	5
100 m Backstroke	Marco Loughran	54.95	1 Q	54.45	4 Q	54.68	4
200 m Backstroke	Marco Loughran	1:59.88	4 Q			2:00.11	6
50 m Breaststroke	Robert Holderness	29.01	9 Q	28.74	8 Q	DNS	WD
100 m Breaststroke	Robert Holderness	1:01.90	6 Q	1:01.64	9	DNQ	
200 m Breaststroke	Robert Holderness	2:13.37	6 Q			2:11.85	6
200 m Butterfly	Thomas Haffield	2:05.13	18			DNQ	
200 m Individual Medley	Ieuan Lloyd	2:03.45	9			DNQ	
400m Individual Medley	Thomas Haffield	4:20.12	4 Q			4:17.47	4

Men – EAD (Para-Sports)

Event	Swimmer(s)	Heats		Semi Finals		Final	
Event	Swimmer(s)	Result	Rank	Result	Rank	Result	Rank
100 m Freestyle S8	David Roberts					1:02.88	4

Women

Event	Swimmer(s)	Rank
50 m Freestyle	Georgia Holderness	-
50 m Freestyle	Sian Morgan	-
100 m Freestyle	Georgia Holderness	-
100 m Freestyle	Sian Morgan	-
200 m Freestyle	Jazmin Carlin	Silver medal
200 m Freestyle	Danielle Stirrat	-
400 m Freestyle	Jazmin Carlin	Bronze medal
400 m Freestyle	Sian Morgan	-
400 m Freestyle	Danielle Stirrat	-
800 m Freestyle	Jazmin Carlin	-
4 × 100 m Freestyle Relay	-	-
4 × 200 m Freestyle Relay	-	-
50 m Backstroke	Georgia Davies	Bronze medal
50 m Backstroke	Jennifer Oldham	-
100 m Backstroke	Georgia Davies	-
200 m Backstroke	-	-
50 m Breaststroke	Georgia Holderness	-
50 m Breaststroke	Sara Lougher	-
50 m Breaststroke	Lowri Tynan	-
100 m Breaststroke	Georgia Holderness	-
100 m Breaststroke	Sara Lougher	-
200 m Breaststroke	Georgia Holderness	-
200 m Breaststroke	Sara Lougher	-
50 m Butterfly	Jemma Lowe	-
100 m Butterfly	Jemma Lowe	Bronze medal
100 m Butterfly	Sian Morgan	-
200 m Butterfly	Jemma Lowe	-
200 m Butterfly	Alys Thomas	-
200 m Individual Medley	Sian Morgan	-
400 m Individual Medley	Sian Morgan	-
4 × 100 m Medley Relay	-	-

Women – EAD (Para-Sports)

Event	Swimmer(s)	Rank
50 m Freestyle S9	-	-
100 m Freestyle S9	-	-
100 m Butterfly S9	-	-

=== Archery ===
Team Wales consists of 6 archers.

Best performance – Quarter-finals
Tapani Kalmaru (Men's Compound Individual)
Janette Howells (Women's Compound Individual)
Women's Team Compound

Men

Event	Archer(s)	Ranking round		Round of 16	Quarter Final	Semi Final	Final	Rank
Event	Archer(s)	Score	Seed	Opposition Result	Opposition Result	Opposition Result	Opposition Result	Rank
Compound Individual	Tapani Kalmaru	Mon 4 Oct	-	Tue 5 Oct	Sat 9 Oct	Sat 9 Oct	Sat 9 Oct	-
Compound Individual	Geraint Thomas	Mon 4 Oct	-	Tue 5 Oct	Sat 9 Oct	Sat 9 Oct	Sat 9 Oct	-
Compound Individual	Andrew Rose	Mon 4 Oct	-	Tue 5 Oct	Sat 9 Oct	Sat 9 Oct	Sat 9 Oct	-
Compound Team	Tapani Kalmaru; Geraint Thomas; Andrew Rose				Wed 6 Oct	Thu 7 Oct	Thu 7 Oct	-

Women

Event	Archer(s)	Ranking round		Round of 16	Quarter Final	Semi Final	Final	Rank
Event	Archer(s)	Score	Seed	Opposition Result	Opposition Result	Opposition Result	Opposition Result	Rank
Compound Individual	Janette Howells	Mon 4 Oct	-	Tue 5 Oct	Sat 9 Oct	Sat 9 Oct	Sat 9 Oct	-
Compound Individual	Jeanette Howells	Mon 4 Oct	-	Tue 5 Oct	Sat 9 Oct	Sat 9 Oct	Sat 9 Oct	-
Compound Individual	Tracy Anderson	Mon 4 Oct	-	Tue 5 Oct	Sat 9 Oct	Sat 9 Oct	Sat 9 Oct	-
Compound Team	Janette Howells; Jeanette Howells; Tracy Anderson				Wed 6 Oct	Thu 7 Oct	Thu 7 Oct	-

=== Athletics ===
Athletics Medal Tally

Gold	Silver	Bronze	TOTAL
1	2	2	5

Team Wales consists of 21 athletes.

Men – Track

Event	Athlete(s)	Heat		Quarter Final		Semi Final		Final	
Event	Athlete(s)	Result	Rank	Result	Rank	Result	Rank	Result	Rank
100m	-	Wed 6 Oct	-	Wed 6 Oct	-	Thu 7 Oct	-	Thu 7 Oct	-
200m	Christian Malcolm	Sat 9 Oct	-	Sat 9 Oct	-	Sun 10 Oct	-	Sun 10 Oct	-
400m	-			Thu 7 Oct	-	Fri 8 Oct	-	Sat 9 Oct	-
800m	Christopher Gowell					Fri 8 Oct	-	Sun 10 Oct	-
800m	Joe Thomas					Fri 8 Oct	-	Sun 10 Oct	-
800m	Gareth Warburton					Fri 8 Oct	-	Sun 10 Oct	-
1,500m	James Thie					Mon 11 Oct	-	Tue 12 Oct	-
5,000m	-							Mon 11 Oct	-
10,000m	-							Tue 12 Oct	-
110 m Hurdles	-					Fri 8 Oct	-	Fri 8 Oct	-
400 m Hurdles	Dai Greene			Fri 8 Oct	-	Sat 9 Oct	-	Sun 10 Oct	-
400 m Hurdles	Rhys Williams			Fri 8 Oct	-	Sat 9 Oct	-	Sun 10 Oct	-
3,000 m Steeplechase	-							Mon 11 Oct	-
4 × 100 m Relay	-					Mon 11 Oct	-	Tue 12 Oct	-
4 × 400 m Relay	-					Mon 11 Oct	-	Tue 12 Oct	-

Men – Throws

Event	Athlete(s)	Qualifying		Final	
Event	Athlete(s)	Result	Rank	Result	Rank
Shot Put	Ryan Spencer Jones	Wed 6 Oct	-	Thu 7 Oct	-
Discus Throw	Brett Morse	Sat 9 Oct	-	Sun 10 Oct	-
Hammer Throw	Matt Richards	Thu 7 Oct	-	Fri 8 Oct	-
Javelin Throw	Lee Doran	Mon 11 Oct	-	Tue 12 Oct	-

Men – Jumps

Event	Athlete(s)	Qualifying		Final	
Event	Athlete(s)	Result	Rank	Result	Rank
Long Jump	-	Fri 8 Oct	-	Sat 9 Oct	-
High Jump	-	Thu 7 Oct	-	Sat 9 Oct	-
Triple Jump	-	Mon 11 Oct	-	Tue 12 Oct	-
Pole Vault	Paul Walker	Sat 9 Oct	-	Mon 11 Oct	-

Men – Combined

Event	Athlete(s)	100m	Long Jump	Shot Put	High Jump	400m	110m Hurdles	Discus	Pole Vault	Javelin	1,500m	Final	
Event	Athlete(s)	100m	Long Jump	Shot Put	High Jump	400m	110m Hurdles	Discus	Pole Vault	Javelin	1,500m	Result	Rank
Decathlon	Benjamin Gregory	-	-	-	-	-	-	-	-	-	-	Fri 8 Oct	-

Men – Road

Event	Athlete(s)	Final	
Event	Athlete(s)	Result	Rank
Marathon	-	Thu 14 Oct	-
20 km Walk	-	Sat 9 Oct	-

Men – EAD (Para-Sports)

Event	Athlete(s)	Heat		Quarter Final		Semi Final		Final	
Event	Athlete(s)	Result	Rank	Result	Rank	Result	Rank	Result	Rank
100 m T46	-	-	-	-	-	-	-	-	-
1,500 m T54 Wheelchair	Brian Alldis	-	-	-	-	-	-	-	-
Shot Put F32/34/52	Ashleigh Hellyer	-	-	-	-	-	-	-	-

Women – Track

Event	Athlete(s)	Heat		Quarter Final		Semi Final		Final	
Event	Athlete(s)	Result	Rank	Result	Rank	Result	Rank	Result	Rank
100m	Elaine O'Neill			Wed 6 Oct	-	Thu 7 Oct	-	Thu 7 Oct	-
200m	Elaine O'Neill			Sat 9 Oct	-	Sun 10 Oct	-	Sun 10 Oct	-
400m	-	Wed 6 Oct	-	Thu 7 Oct	-	Fri 8 Oct	-	Sat 9 Oct	-
800m	-			Sat 9 Oct	-	Sun 10 Oct	-	Mon 11 Oct	-
1,500m	-					Thu 7 Oct	-	Fri 8 Oct	-
5,000m	-							Wed 6 Oct	-
10,000m	-							Fri 8 Oct	-
100 m Hurdles	-					Sun 10 Oct	-	Mon 11 Oct	-
400 m Hurdles	-					Sat 9 Oct	-	Sun 10 Oct	-
3,000 m Steeplechase	-							Sat 9 Oct	-
4 × 100 m Relay	-					Mon 11 Oct	-	Tue 12 Oct	-
4 × 400 m Relay	-					Mon 11 Oct	-	Tue 12 Oct	-

Women – Throws

Event	Athlete(s)	Qualifying		Final	
Event	Athlete(s)	Result	Rank	Result	Rank
Shot Put	Philippa Roles	Fri 8 Oct	-	Sat 9 Oct	-
Discus Throw	-	Sun 10 Oct	-	Mon 11 Oct	-
Hammer Throw	Laura Douglas	Wed 6 Oct	-	Thu 7 Oct	-
Hammer Throw	Carys Parry	Wed 6 Oct	-	Thu 7 Oct	Silver medal
Javelin Throw	-	Fri 8 Oct	-	Sat 9 Oct	-

Women – Jumps

Event	Athlete(s)	Qualifying		Final	
Event	Athlete(s)	Result	Rank	Result	Rank
Long Jump	-	Sat 9 Oct	-	Sun 10 Oct	-
High Jump	-	Fri 8 Oct	-	Sun 10 Oct	-
Triple Jump	-	Thu 7 Oct	-	Fri 8 Oct	-
Pole Vault	Sally Peake	Sun 10 Oct	-	Tue 12 Oct	-

Women – Combined

Event	Athlete(s)	100m Hurdles	High Jump	Shot Put	200m	Long Jump	Javelin	800m	Final	
Event	Athlete(s)	100m Hurdles	High Jump	Shot Put	200m	Long Jump	Javelin	800m	Result	Rank
Heptathlon	-	-	-	-	-	-	-	-	Sat 9 Oct	-

Women – Road

Event	Athlete(s)	Final	
Event	Athlete(s)	Result	Rank
Marathon	-	Thu 14 Oct	-
20 km Walk	-	Sat 9 Oct	-

Women – EAD (Para-Sports)

Event	Athlete(s)	Heat		Quarter Final		Semi Final		Final	
Event	Athlete(s)	Result	Rank	Result	Rank	Result	Rank	Result	Rank
100 m T37	Jenny McLoughlin	-	-	-	-	-	-	-	Silver medal
1,500 m T54 Wheelchair	-	-	-	-	-	-	-	-	-
Shot Put F32-34/52/53	-	-	-	-	-	-	-	-	-

=== Badminton ===
Team Wales consists of 7 badminton players.

Men

Athlete	Events
Martyn Lewis	singles, mixed doubles
Jonathan Morgan	men's doubles
James Phillips	men's doubles, mixed doubles
James van Hooijdonk	singles

Women

Athlete	Events
Caroline Harvey	women's doubles, mixed doubles
Sarah Thomas	singles, mixed doubles
Carissa Turner	singles, women's doubles

Men

Event	Player(s)	Round of 64	Round of 32	Round of 16	Quarter Final	Semi Final	Final	Rank
Event	Player(s)	Opposition Result	Opposition Result	Opposition Result	Opposition Result	Opposition Result	Opposition Result	Rank
Men's Singles	-	-	-	-	-	-	-	-
Men's Doubles	-	-	-	-	-	-	-	-

Women

Event	Player(s)	Round of 64	Round of 32	Round of 16	Quarter Final	Semi Final	Final	Rank
Event	Player(s)	Opposition Result	Opposition Result	Opposition Result	Opposition Result	Opposition Result	Opposition Result	Rank
Women's Singles	-	-	-	-	-	-	-	-
Women's Doubles	-	-	-	-	-	-	-	-

Mixed

Event	Player(s)	Round of 64	Round of 32	Round of 16	Quarter Final	Semi Final	Final	Rank
Event	Player(s)	Opposition Result	Opposition Result	Opposition Result	Opposition Result	Opposition Result	Opposition Result	Rank
Mixed Doubles	-	-	-	-	-	-	-	-

Team Event

Event	Player(s)	Pool Games	Quarter Final	Semi Final	Final	Rank
Event	Player(s)	Opposition Result	Opposition Result	Opposition Result	Opposition Result	Rank
Mixed Team	TBA	India	Thu 7 Oct	Thu 7 Oct	Fri 8 Oct	-
Mixed Team	TBA	Scotland	Thu 7 Oct	Thu 7 Oct	Fri 8 Oct	-
Mixed Team	TBA	Barbados	Thu 7 Oct	Thu 7 Oct	Fri 8 Oct	-
Mixed Team	TBA	Kenya	Thu 7 Oct	Thu 7 Oct	Fri 8 Oct	-

=== Boxing ===
Team Wales consists of 9 boxers.

Men

Event	Boxer	Round of 32	Round of 16	Quarter Final	Semi Final	Final	Rank
Event	Boxer	Opposition Result	Opposition Result	Opposition Result	Opposition Result	Opposition Result	Rank
Flyweight 52 kg	Andrew Selby	-	Tommy Stubbs; W +1 – 1	Haroon Iqbal; L 3 - +3	-	-	5
Bantamweight 56 kg	Sean McGoldrick	-	Jessie Lartey; W 5 – 2	Tyrone McCullagh; W 4 – 3	Louis Julie; W 2 – 1	Manju Wanniarachchi; L 8 - +8 (Wanniarachchi later disqualified after positive dope test)	Gold medal
Lightweight 60 kg	Darren Edwards	-	Josh Taylor; L 1 – 5	-	-	-	9
Light Welterweight 64 kg	Christopher Jenkins	Louis Colin; L 0 – 7	-	-	-	-	17
Welterweight 69 kg	Fred Evans	Joseph St.Pierre; L 8 - +8	-	-	-	-	17
Middleweight 75 kg	Keiron Harding	Habib Ahmed; W 5 – 1	Jovan Young; W 8 – 4	Nisar Khan; W 5 – 2	Eamonn O'Kane; L 12 – 6	-	Bronze medal
Light Heavyweight 81 kg	Jermaine Asare	Tarieta Ruata; W 6 – 3	Ahmed Saraku; W +3 – 3	Filimaua Hala; W 10 – 4	Callum Johnson; L RSC	-	Bronze medal
Heavyweight 91 kg	Kevin Evans	Samir El-Mais; L 2 – 11	-	-	-	-	17
Super Heavyweight +91kg	Andrew Wyn Jones	-	Blaise Yepmou; L RSC	-	-	-	9

=== Cycling ===
Team Wales consists of 17 cyclists.

Team Wales:
Men: Yanto Barker, Paul Esposti, Jon Mould, Lewis Oliva, Rob Partridge, Sam Harrison, Luke Rowe, Geraint Thomas, Rhys Lloyd
Women: Jessica Allen, Angharad Mason, Kara Chesworth, Lily Matthews, Nicole Cooke, Alex Greenfield, Hannah Rich, Becky James

=== Road ===
Men

Event	Cyclist(s)	Time	Rank
40 km Time Trial	-	-	-
167 km Road Race	TBA	-	-

Women

Event	Cyclist(s)	Time	Rank
29 km Time Trial	-	-	-
100 km Road Race	Nicole Cooke	-	5

=== Track ===
Men

Event	Cyclist(s)	Qualifying		1/16 Final	1/8 Final	Quarter Final	Semi Final	Final	Rank
Event	Cyclist(s)	Time	Rank	Opposition Result	Opposition Result	Opposition Result	Opposition Result	Opposition Result	Rank
1 km Time Trial	TBA							-	-
Individual Sprint	TBA	-	-	-	-	-	-	-	-
Team Sprint	TBA	-						-	-
Individual Pursuit	TBA	-						-	-
Team Pursuit	TBA	-						-	-
Kieren	TBA				-	-	-	-	-
Scratch Race	TBA							-	-
Points Race	TBA							-	-

Women

Event	Cyclist(s)	Qualifying		1/16 Final	1/8 Final	Quarter Final	Semi Final	Final	Rank
Event	Cyclist(s)	Time	Rank	Opposition Result	Opposition Result	Opposition Result	Opposition Result	Opposition Result	Rank
500 m Time Trial	TBA							-	-
Individual Sprint	TBA	-	-	-	-	-	-	-	-
Team Sprint	TBA	-						-	-
Individual Pursuit	TBA	-						-	-
Scratch Race	TBA							-	-
Points Race	TBA							-	-

=== Gymnastics ===
Team Wales consists of 6 gymnasts

Artistic

Men

Alex Rothe, Grant Gardiner, Matthew Hennessey, Robert Hunter, Clinton Purnell

Event	Gymnast(s)	Qualification		Final	
Event	Gymnast(s)	Points	Rank	Points	Rank
Team Competition	TBA	-	-	-	-
Individual All-Round	TBA	-	-	-	-
Floor	TBA	-	-	-	-
Horizontal Bar	TBA	-	-	-	-
Parallel Bars	TBA	-	-	-	-
Pommel Horse	TBA	-	-	-	-
Rings	TBA	-	-	-	-
Vault	TBA	-	-	-	-

Women

Event	Gymnast(s)	Qualification		Final	
Event	Gymnast(s)	Points	Rank	Points	Rank
Team Competition	TBA	-	-	-	-
Individual All-Round	TBA	-	-	-	-
Beam	TBA	-	-	-	-
Floor	TBA	-	-	-	-
Uneven Bars	TBA	-	-	-	-
Vault	TBA	-	-	-	-

Rhythmic

Women

Francesca Jones

Event	Gymnast(s)	Qualification		Final	
Event	Gymnast(s)	Points	Rank	Points	Rank
Team Competition	TBA	-	-	-	-
Individual All-Round	TBA	-	-	-	-
Ball	TBA	-	-	-	-
Hoop	TBA	-	-	-	-
Ribbon	TBA	-	-	-	-
Rope	TBA	-	-	-	-

=== Hockey ===
Team Wales consists of 16 hockey players.

Summary

Event	Team	Rank
Men's Team	-	-
Women's Team	Wales	-

Men

Wales' Men did not qualify for the 2010 Commonwealth Games

Women

Sarah Thomas
Alys Brooks
Natalie Blyth
Dawn Mitchell
Katrin Budd
Emma Griffiths
Carys Hopkins
Louise Pugh-Bevan
Philippa Jones
Claire Lowry
Elen Mumford
Ella Rafferty
Maggs Rees
Abigail Welsford
Leah Wilkinson
Emma Keen

Pool B

Team	Pts	Pld	W	D	L	GF	GA	GD
New Zealand	9	3	3	0	0	14	2	+12
England	6	3	2	0	1	9	6	+3
Malaysia	3	3	1	0	2	4	9	–5
Canada	3	3	1	0	2	5	8	–3
Wales	3	4	1	0	3	5	12	–7

4 October 2010
10:30

New Zealand	5–1	Wales
Glynn 18'; Flynn 37'; Thorpe 51' 59'; Eshuis 68'	Report	Welsford 33'

Umpires:
Irene Presenqui (ARG)
Elena Eskina (RUS)

5 October 2010
08:30

England	4–1	Wales
Cullen 10' 20' 41'; Craddock 49'	Report	Thomas 69'

Umpires:
Irene Presenqui (ARG)
Nor Piza Hassan (MAS)

7 October 2010
13:00

Malaysia	1–2	Wales
Nadia 39'	Report	Wilkinson 24'; Lowry 56'

Umpires:
Gillian Batey (CAN)
Anupama Puchimanda (IND)

8 October 2010
18:30

Canada	v	Wales

=== Lawn bowls ===
Men

Athlete	Events	Club
Chris Blake	triples	Barry Athletic BC
Andrew Fleming	triples	Machynlleth BC
Jason Greenslade	pairs	Penarth BC
Martin Selway	pairs	Caerphilly Town BC
Robert Weale	singles	Presteigne BC
Marc Wyatt	triples	Caerphilly Town BC

Women

Athlete	Events	Club
Anwen Butten	pairs	Lampeter BC
Carol Difford	singles	Gilfach Bargoed BC
Isabel Jones	triples	Berriew BC
Kathy Pearce	triples	Berriew BC
Wendy Price	triples	Llandrindod Wells BC
Hannah Smith	pairs	Carmarthen BBC

=== Rugby sevens ===
Summary

Event	Team	Rank
Men's Team	Wales	-

Men

Player	Club
Jevon Groves (captain)	Cross Keys
Alex Cuthbert	Cardiff Blues
Gareth Davies	Cardiff
Ifan Evans	Llandovery
Rhys Jones	Newport
Kristian Phillips	Ospreys
Tom Prydie	Ospreys
Richie Pugh	Scarlets
Lee Rees	Scarlets
Rhys Shellard	Cardiff
Aaron Shingler	Scarlets
Lee Williams	Scarlets

Group B

Team	Pld	W	D	L	PF	PA	PD	Pts
South Africa	3	3	0	0	109	5	+104	9
Wales	3	2	0	1	99	35	+64	7
Tonga	3	1	0	2	45	72	−27	5
India	3	0	0	3	12	153	−141	3

11 October 2010
09:22

Wales	56-7	India

Delhi University

11 October 2010
12:28

Wales	38-7	Tonga

Delhi University

11 October 2010
17:10

Wales	5-21	South Africa

Delhi University

=== Shooting ===
Team Wales consists of 19.

Men

Malcolm Allen, Rhys Price, Mike Wixey, Scott Morgan, David Phelps, Jamie Dummer, John Croydon, Steve Pengelly, Alan Green, Robert Oxford, Gareth Morris

Women

Johanne Brekke, Jennifer Corish, Sian Corish, Helen Warnes, Cheryl Gizzi, Jacquelyn Lewis, Rachel Gravell, Nicola Wilson

Clay Target

Men

Athlete	Event	Qualification		Final	
Athlete	Event	Points	Rank	Points	Rank
Malcolm Allen	Skeet	112	19	Did not advance	
Rhys Price	Skeet	113	17	Did not advance	
Malcolm Allen; Rhys Price	Skeet Pairs	—N/a		182	8
Mike Wixey	Trap	119	12	Did not advance	
Scott Morgan	Trap	112	25	Did not advance	
Mike Wixey; Scott Morgan	Trap Pairs	—N/a		185	8

Women

Athlete	Event	Final	
Athlete	Event	Points	Rank
Jacquelyn Lewis	Trap	61	18
Cheryl Gizzi	Trap	57	21
Jacquelyn Lewis; Cheryl Gizzi	Trap Pairs	78	9

Pistol

Men

Athlete	Event	Stage 1		Stage 2		Final	
Athlete	Event	Points	Rank	Points	Rank	Points	Rank
Alan Green	25 metre standard pistol	—N/a				543	13
Steve Pengelly	25 metre standard pistol	—N/a				544	12
Alan Green; Steve Pengelly	25 metre standard pistol pairs	—N/a				1075	8
Alan Green	25 metre centre fire pistol	—N/a				574-19x	8
Steve Pengelly	25 metre centre fire pistol	—N/a				555-15x	20
Alan Green; Steve Pengelly	25 metre centre fire pistol pairs	—N/a				1125	7
Alan Green	25 metre rapid fire pistol	—N/a				537-6	10
Steve Pengelly	25 metre rapid fire pistol	—N/a				543-8	9
Alan Green; Steve Pengelly	25 metre rapid fire pistol pairs	533	5	509	5	1042	5

Women

Athlete	Event	Qualification		Final	
Athlete	Event	Points	Rank	Points	Rank
Rachel Gravell	10 metre air pistol	364	17	Did not advance	
Nicola Wilson	10 metre air pistol	370	10	Did not advance	
Rachel Gravell; Nicola Wilson	10 metre air pistol Pairs	—N/a		718	8

Small Bore and Air Rifle

Men

Athlete	Event	Qualification		Final	
Athlete	Event	Points	Rank	Points	Rank
Jamie Dummer	50 m rifle prone	585	19	Did not advance	
David Phelps	50 m rifle prone	587	17	Did not advance	
Jamie Dummer; David Phelps	50 m rifle prone Pairs	—N/a		1160	10
John Croydon	50 m rifle 3 positions	—N/a		1136	7

Women

Athlete	Event	Qualification		Final	
Athlete	Event	Points	Rank	Points	Rank
Jenny Corish	10 m air rifle	387	15	Did not advance	
Sian Corish	10 m air rifle	391	8 Q	491.9	8
Sian Corish; Jenny Corish	10 m air rifle Pairs	—N/a		784	5
Johanne Brekke	50 m rifle prone	—N/a		593	3rd place, bronze medalist(s)
Helen Warnes	50 m rifle prone	—N/a		586	10
Johanne Brekke; Helen Warnes	50 m rifle prone Pairs	—N/a		1166	4
Sian Corish	50 m rifle 3 positions	569	8	662.7	8
Helen Warnes	50 m rifle 3 positions	564	12	Did not advance	
Sian Corish; Helen Warnes	50 m rifle 3 positions Pairs	—N/a		1122	6

Full Bore

Open

Athlete	Event	Stage 1		Stage 2		Stage 3		Total	
Athlete	Event	Points	Rank	Points	Rank	Points	Rank	Points	Rank
Gareth Morris	Individual							390-34v	8
Robert Oxford	Individual							390-32v	10
Gareth Morris; Robert Oxford	Pairs							559-13v	13

=== Table Tennis ===
Team Wales consists of 8 table tennis.

Men

Ryan Jenkins
Stephen Jenkins
Adam Robertson
Patrick Thomas

Event	Player(s)	Rank
Men's Singles	-	-
Men's Doubles	-	-
Men's Team	-	-

Women

Charlotte Carey
Naomi Owen
Angharad Phillips
Megan Phillips

Event	Player(s)	Rank
Women's Singles	-	-
Women's Doubles	-	-
Women's Team	-	-

Women – EAD (Para-Sports)

Event	Player(s)	Rank
Women's Wheelchair	-	-

Mixed

Event	Player(s)	Rank
Mixed Doubles	-	-

=== Tennis ===
Team Wales consists of 2 players in 1 event.

Men's Singles

Player	Round of 32	Round of 16	Quarter Final	Semi Final	Final	Rank
Player	Opposition Result	Opposition Result	Opposition Result	Opposition Result	Opposition Result	Rank
Joshua Milton (8)	(Kenya) Mwangi (KEN); W 6–0, 6–2	(England) Hutchins (ENG); W 6–4, 6–2	(Australia) Luczak (AUS) (2); L 6–4, 2–6, 0–6	-	-	-
Chris Lewis	(Scotland) Fleming (SCO); L 7–5, 5–7, 1–6	-	-	-	-	-

=== Weightlifting ===
Team Wales consists of 6 weightlifters.

Men

Event	Weightlifter	Weights Lifted		Total Lifted	Rank
Event	Weightlifter	Snatch	Clean & Jerk	Total Lifted	Rank
56 kg	-	-	-	-	-
62 kg	Gareth Evans	111	135	246	12
69 kg	-	-	-	-	-
77 kg	-	-	-	-	-
85 kg	-	-	-	-	-
94 kg	-	-	-	-	-
105 kg	-	-	-	-	-
+105 kg	-	-	-	-	-

Men – EAD (Powerlifting)

Event	Weightlifter	Weights Lifted	Factored Weight	Rank
Bench Press	Kyron Duke	-	-	-
Bench Press	Daniel Steward	-	-	-

Women

Event	Weightlifter	Weights Lifted		Total Lifted	Rank
Event	Weightlifter	Snatch	Clean & Jerk	Total Lifted	Rank
48 kg	-	-	-	-	-
53 kg	-	-	-	-	-
58 kg	-	-	-	-	-
63 kg	Michaela Breeze	92	110	202	Silver medal
69 kg	Natasha Perdue	-	-	-	DNF
75 kg	-	-	-	-	-
+75 kg	-	-	-	-	-

Women – EAD (Powerlifting)

Event	Weightlifter	Weights Lifted	Factored Weight	Rank
Bench Press	Julie Salmon	77.5	48.39	8

=== Wrestling ===
Team Wales consists of 7 wrestlers.

Men: Brett Hawthorn, Damion Arzu, Kiran Manu, Craig Pilling
Women: Non Evans, Sarah Connolly, Kate Rennie

Men – Freestyle

Event	Wrestler	Rank 12
Freestyle 55 kg	-	-
Freestyle 60 kg	-	-
Freestyle 66 kg	-	-
Freestyle 74 kg	-	-
Freestyle 84 kg	-	-
Freestyle 96 kg	-	-
Freestyle 120 kg	-	-

Men – Greco-Roman

Event	Wrestler	Rank
Greco-Roman 55 kg	-	-
Greco-Roman 60 kg	-	-
Greco-Roman 66 kg	-	-
Greco-Roman 74 kg	-	-
Greco-Roman 84 kg	-	-
Greco-Roman 96 kg	-	-
Greco-Roman 120 kg	-	-

Women

Event	Wrestler	Rank
Freestyle 48 kg	-	-
Freestyle 51 kg	-	-
Freestyle 55 kg	-	-
Freestyle 59 kg	-	-
Freestyle 63 kg	-	-
Freestyle 67 kg	-	-
Freestyle 72 kg	-	-

== See also ==
- Wales at the 2006 Commonwealth Games
