= Cycling at the 2010 Commonwealth Games – Women's road race =

Cycling – Women's road race at the 2010 Commonwealth Games
- Venue: Indira Gandhi Arena
- Dates: 10 October 2010
- Competitors: 58 from 16 nations

Medalists
gold medal	Rochelle Gilmore	Australia
silver medal	Lizzie Armitstead	England
bronze medal	Chloe Hosking	Australia

The Women's road race took place at 10 October 2010 at the Indira Gandhi Arena. The race started at 9:00 and covered 112 km.

== Final classification ==
The notation "s.t." indicates that the rider crossed the finish line in the same group as the one receiving the time above them, and was therefore credited with the same finishing time.

Rank	Rider	Time
Gold medal	Rochelle Gilmore (AUS)	2:49:30
Silver medal	Lizzie Armitstead (ENG)	s.t.
Bronze medal	Chloe Hosking (AUS)	s.t.
4	Joanne Kiesanowski (NZL)	s.t.
5	Nicole Cooke (WAL)	s.t.
6	Joëlle Numainville (CAN)	s.t.
7	Tara Whitten (CAN)	s.t.
8	Carla Swart (RSA)	s.t.
9	Melissa Holt (NZL)	s.t.
10	Cherise Taylor (RSA)	s.t.
11	Kaytee Boyd (NZL)	s.t.
12	Victoria Whitelaw (AUS)	s.t.
13	Erinne Willock (CAN)	s.t.
14	Lucy Martin (ENG)	s.t.
15	Anne Samplonius (CAN)	s.t.
16	Katie Colclough (ENG)	s.t.
17	Kate Cullen (SCO)	2:49:38
18	Megan Dunn (AUS)	s.t.
19	Heather Wilson (NIR)	s.t.
20	Eileen Roe (SCO)	s.t.
21	Anriette Schoeman (RSA)	s.t.
22	Leah Kirchmann (CAN)	s.t.
23	Rushlee Buchanan (NZL)	s.t.
24	Claire Thomas (SCO)	s.t.
25	Catherine Cheatley (NZL)	s.t.
26	Linda Villumsen (NZL)	s.t.
27	Alexis Rhodes (AUS)	s.t.
28	Sharon Laws (ENG)	2:49:45
29	Robyn de Groot (RSA)	2:49:47

Rank	Rider	Time
30	Aurelie Halbwachs (MRI)	2:49:49
31	Pippa Handley (SCO)	2:49:64
32	Ruth Corset (AUS)	2:49:58
33	Emma Trott (ENG)	2:50:17
34	Emma Pooley (ENG)	2:50:19
35	Jane Barr (SCO)	2:50:32
36	Julie Beveridge (CAN)	s.t.
37	Anne Ewing (SCO)	2:54:46
38	Ann Bowditch (GUE)	3:08:44
–	Lily Matthews (WAL)	DNF
–	Rejani Vijaya (IND)	DNF
–	Lasanthi Gunathilaka (SRI)	DNF
–	Pana Choudhary (IND)	DNF
–	Kara Chesworth (WAL)	DNF
–	Marissa van der Merwe (RSA)	DNF
–	Mahitha Mohan (IND)	DNF
–	Jess Allen (WAL)	DNF
–	Joyce Nyaruri (KEN)	DNF
–	Claire Fraser (GUY)	DNF
–	Angharad Mason (WAL)	DNF
–	Suchitra Konsam (IND)	DNF
–	Jane Kamau (KEN)	DNF
–	Hadijah Najjuko (UGA)	DNF
–	Marion Ayebale (UGA)	DNF
–	Sharon Kiragu (KEN)	DNF
–	Sunita Yanglem (IND)	DNF
–	Shalini Zabaneh (BIZ)	DNF
–	Renu Balu (IND)	DNF
–	Wendy Houvenaghel (NIR)	DNS
