= St. Davids Polo and Racing Club =

The St. Davids Polo and Racing Club, established in 1998, is a Welsh polo club, notable for its charity polo days at Fonmon Castle, Cardiff. The club's Patron is Viscount St Davids.

Many celebrities and members of Welsh society attend the annual polo day. Notable former guests have included Jodie Kidd, Siân Lloyd, Charlotte Church and three former Miss Wales.

One notable former player at the club's event is American TV star Stefanie Powers. Professional polo player Jack Kidd, brother of supermodel Jodie, has also played for the club.

In 2008, Prince Charles wrote the foreword to the match day programme, praising the work of club chairman, Geoff Lloyd, in supporting The Prince's Trust in Wales.

In 2009, the club added further two fixtures to its successful Fonmon Castle polo day: a charity polo day at the Legge-Bourke estate, Glanusk Park in July and beach polo at Swansea Bay, in collaboration with society fixer Arwel Richards. To raise funds for a breast cancer charity, Richards arranged for his friend Alex, the polo playing son of Lord Charlie Brocket, to model the St David Polo Club's new shirt, at a charity fashion show.
