= Arwel =

Arwel (pronounced [ˈarwɛl]) is a Welsh masculine given name meaning "wept over." Notable persons with this name include:

- Arwel Hughes (1909–1988), Welsh orchestral conductor and composer
- Arwel Gruffydd (born 1967), Welsh actor and director
- Arwel Thomas (born 1974), Wales international rugby union player
- Arwel Richards (born 1982), Welsh polo administrator and columnist
- Arwel Robson (born 1997), Welsh rugby union player
- Owain Arwel Hughes (born 1942), Welsh orchestral conductor
