= Welsh National Road Race Championships =

Cycling competition

The Welsh National Road Race Championships are a bicycle racing event that are held annually in Wales, UK, and include several categories of rider.

== Men ==
=== Senior ===
Year	Gold	Silver	Bronze
1991	Alun Owen	Keith Jones	Martin Jones
1992	Daniel Wedley	Paul Esposti	Julian Winn
1993	Tim Davies	Daniel Wedley	Will Wright
1995	Paul Esposti		
1996	Simon Bray		
1997	Mat Postle	Carwyn Nott	Steven Ramsay
1998	Julian Winn	Richard Wooles	Anthony Malarczyk
1999	Huw Pritchard	Ian Jeremiah	James Griffiths
2000	Julian Winn	Gareth Sheppard	Andrew Butcher
2001	Paul Sheppard	Gareth Jones	Rohan Davies
2002	Andrew Windsor	Chris Anelay	Will Wright
2003	Huw Pritchard	Andrew Martin	Gareth Jones
2004	Geraint Thomas	Andrew Martin	Chris Anelay
2005	Geraint Thomas	Will Wright	Chris Anelay
2006	Dale Appleby	Neil Jones	Richard Sykes-Popham
2007	Stephen Lloyd	Hugh Wilson	Christian Prior
2008	Rob Partridge	Rhys Lloyd	Richard Harris
2009	Rob Partridge	Rhys Lloyd	Hugh Wilson
2010	Dale Appleby	Gareth McGuiness	Brendan Sullivan
2011	Gruff Lewis	Brendan Sullivan	Niklas Gustavsson
2021	Marinus Peterson	Joe Holt	Edward Morgan
2022	Samuel Beckett	Owain Roberts	William Truelove

=== Veteran ===
Year	Gold	Silver	Bronze
1991	Graham Weigh	Neil Downes	Phil Windsor
1992	John Williams	Neil Downes	Dave Panting
1993			
1994	Wayne Milward	Roly Mery	Alan Belton
1995			
1996	Gordon Wallace	Chris Singleton	
1998	Wayne Milward	Bernard Brown	Paul Spencer
1999	Keith Jones	Clifford Jackson	Michael Ives
2000	Keith Jones	Chris Singleton	Anthony Crabbe
2001	Keith Jones	Paul Crabbe	Stuart Hall
2002	Steve Edwards	Gordon Wallace	Stuart Hall
2003	Marcus Walker	Sean Grosvenor	Stephen Lloyd
2004	Gary Thomas	Paul Spencer	Jeremy Rees
2005	Norman Hughes	Keith Jones	Paul Bennett
2006	Norman Hughes	John Skates	Ed Demery
2007	John Skates	Mike Lindsay	Ed Demery
2008	Norman Hughes	John Skates	Keith Jones
2009	Brendan Sullivan	Phil Mason	Ian Jeremiah
2010	Gerry Bowditch	John Wylie	David Mills
2011	Gerry Bowditch	Jonathan Shepherd	John Wylie

=== Junior ===
Year	Gold	Silver	Bronze
1991	Stephen Colloby	Chris Rudall	Jamie Vaughan
1992	Geraint Day	[Carwyn Nott	Jamie Vaughan
1993	Anthony Malarczyk	Justin Varney	Huw Pritchard
1998	David Heaven	Richard Rees	Dave Bees
1999	Rhys Gruffydd	David Heaven	Dave Bees
2000	David Heaven	Ryan Bevis	Jonathan Slack
2001	Peter Jones	Jonathan Ingarfield	Russell Jones
2002	Mike Davis	Adrian Gammage	Jonathon Ingarfield
2003	Rob Partridge	Tomos Williams	
2005	Tom Smith	Matthew Rowe	
2006	Rhys Lloyd	Luke Rowe	Sion O'Boyle
2007	Luke Rowe	Mike Webb	Andrew Williams
2008	Andrew Williams		
2009	Rhys Gravelle	Sam Harrison	Jon Mould
2010			
2011	Dan Pearson	Matthew Haase	Matthew Thompson
2021	Griff Lewis	Benjamin Bright	Spencer Davies
2022	Rhys Thomas	Fred Meredith	Luke Wyatt

== Women ==
Year	Gold	Silver	Bronze
1998	Louise Jones	Clare Greenwood	Julie Hooper
1999	Megan Hughes	Clare Greenwood	Rhian Thomas
2006	Claire Lines	Jessica Allen	
2007	Katie Curtis	Hannah Rich	Lizzy Goodband
2008	Jackie Garner		
2009	Hannah Rich	Angharad Mason	Caroline Gay
2010	Lily Matthews	Kara Chesworth	Hannah Rich
2011	Hannah Rich	Lowri Bunn	Angharad Mason
2021	Leah Dixon	Anna Morris	Jasmine Jones
