= Cycling at the 2010 Commonwealth Games – Women's scratch race =

The Women's Scratch took place at 7 October 2010 at the Indira Gandhi Arena.

== Results ==
Rank	Name	Nation	Laps Down
1st place, gold medalist(s)	Megan Dunn	Australia	
2nd place, silver medalist(s)	Joanne Kiesanowski	New Zealand	
3rd place, bronze medalist(s)	Anna Blyth	England	
4	Alex Greenfield	Wales	
5	Belinda Goss	Australia	
6	Hannah Rich	Wales	
7	Rushlee Buchanan	New Zealand	
8	Kate Cullen	Scotland	
9	Laura Trott	England	
10	Suchitra Devi	India	
11	Lucy Martin	England	
12	Mahitha Mohan	India	
13	Heather Wilson	Northern Ireland	
14	Tara Whitten	Canada	
15	Gemma Dudley	New Zealand	
16	Eileen Roe	Scotland	
DNF	Ashlee Ankudinoff	Australia	
DNF	Rejani Vijaya Kumari	India	
