= Chukker =

Chukker may refer to:

- Chukker, or chukka, a playing period in polo and beach polo
- Emma Caulfield (born Emma Chukker, 1973)

== See also ==
- List of English words of Sanskrit origin
