= Jo Kiesanowski =

New Zealand cyclist

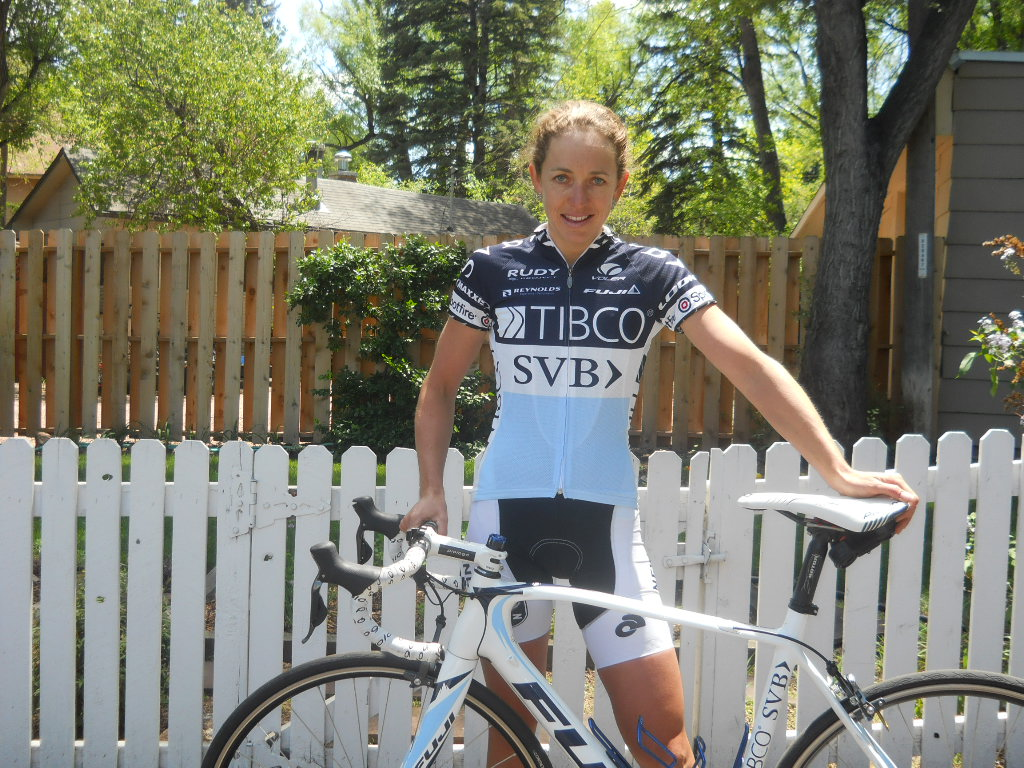
- Kiesanowski in 2013

Personal information
- Full name: Joanne Marie Kiesanowski
- Nickname: Jo
- Born: 24 May 1979 (age 47) Christchurch, New Zealand

Cycling career
- Sport: Cycling
- Disciplines: Road and track
- Role: Rider

Professional teams
- 2001: Procter & Gamble
- 2002–2003: Diet Rite
- 2005: Nobili Rubinetterie–Menikini Cogeas
- 2006–2008: Univega Pro Cycling Team
- 2008: Fenixs
- 2009–2016: Team Tibco
Medal record
Women's track cycling
Representing New Zealand
Commonwealth Games
Silver medal – second place	2010 Delhi	Scratch race

Joanne Marie Kiesanowski (born 24 May 1979) is a New Zealand former professional cyclist, who won the silver medal in the women's scratch race at the 2010 Commonwealth Games. She is married to Jeff Pierce, a former professional cyclist.

The 2012 Summer Olympics was Kiesanowski's third Olympics, having already competed in the women's road race at the 2004 and 2008 Olympics.

== Major results ==
=== Road ===
2001
10th Liberty Classic
2003
1st Road race, National Championships
2004
4th Sparkassen Giro Bochum
8th Primavera Rosa
9th Gran Premio Castilla y León
9th Tour of Flanders
9th Liberty Classic
2005
1st Stage 4 Thüringen Ladies Tour
3rd GP Cento Carnevale d'Europa
4th Australia World Cup
4th Grand Prix de Dottignies
5th Tour de Berne
8th New Zealand World Cup
10th Rund um die Nürnberger Altstadt
2006
1st Stage 4 Tour de l'Aude Cycliste Féminin
4th New Zealand World Cup
6th Road race, Commonwealth Games
10th Overall Grande Boucle Féminine Internationale

1st Stage 2b

10th Gran Premio Castilla y León
10th Australia World Cup
2007
4th Liberty Classic
4th Drentse 8 van Dwingeloo
5th Overall Trophée d'Or Féminin
6th Australia World Cup
8th Overall Tour de l'Aude Cycliste Féminin
8th Rund um die Nürnberger Altstadt
2008
1st Prologue & Stage 3 Mount Hood Cycling Classic
2nd Overall Tour de Bretagne Féminin

1st Stage 2

2nd Commerce Bank Reading Classic
4th Overall Tour of the Gila
7th Liberty Classic
8th Road race, UCI Road World Championships
9th Overall Trophée d'Or Féminin
2009
1st Stage 2 Joe Martin Stage Race
2nd Liberty Classic
2010
1st Stage 4 Cascade Cycling Classic
2nd Grand Prix Cycliste de Gatineau
4th Road race, Commonwealth Games
7th GP Stad Roeselare
9th Liberty Classic
2011
6th Liberty Classic
2012
6th Liberty Classic
2013
3rd Road race, National Championships
8th Grand Prix Cycliste de Gatineau
2014
8th Grand Prix Cycliste de Gatineau
9th The Philadelphia Cycling Classic
2015
3rd White Spot / Delta Road Race
2016
3rd Road race, National Championships
5th Grand Prix Cycliste de Gatineau
8th La Course by Le Tour de France
8th Winston-Salem Cycling Classic

=== Track ===
2001
National Championships

1st Points race
1st Scratch

2004
2nd Scratch, Oceanian Championships
2006
1st Points race, National Championships
2007
1st Points race, National Championships
2nd Points race, Oceanian Championships
2010
2nd Scratch race, Commonwealth Games
2012
National Championships

1st Points race
1st Scratch

2015
2nd Points race, U.S. Vic Williams Memorial Grand Prix
3rd Scratch, Festival of Speed
