= Matt Beckett =

Welsh cyclist

Personal information
- Full name: Matthew Graham Beckett
- Born: 13 July 1973 (age 53) Lancaster, England
- Height: 6 ft 3 in (191 cm)

Cycling career
- Sport: Cycling
- Current team: Cardiff JIF
- Discipline: Road
- Role: Rider

Amateur teams
- Cardiff JIF
- CC Abergavenny

Professional teams
- 1996: Giant
- 1997: PDM Sport
- 1998: Northern Foil/Deeside Cycles & Paul Donohue/North Wirral Velo
- 1999: Men's Health
- 2000: Angliasport
- 2005: Lifeforce

Major wins
- 1999 Silver Spoon Premier Calendar 2 Day; 2005 L'Étape de la Déponce, 2 day stage race

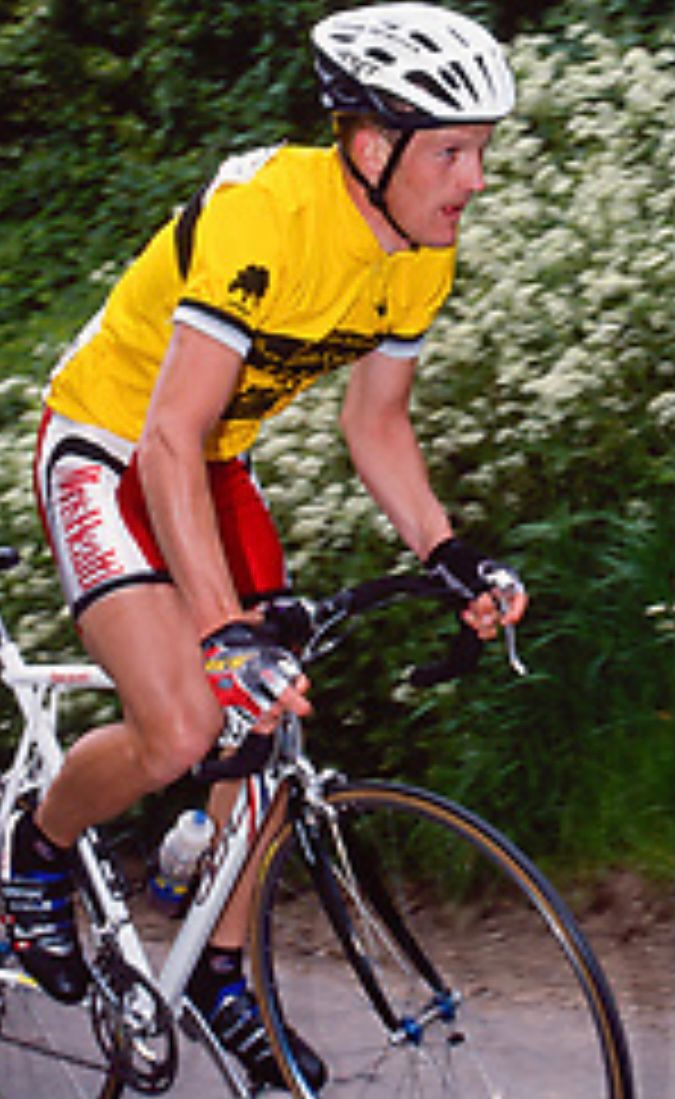
Matt Beckett - Welsh Cyclist

Matt Beckett (born 13 July 1973) is a Welsh former-professional cyclist who was born in Lancaster. He represented Wales in the 1998 Commonwealth Games in Kuala Lumpur. He was briefly one of the directors of Welsh Cycling in 2006.

== Palmarès ==
1998
2nd International Archer Grand Prix, Premier Calendar
2nd Lincoln Grand Prix, Premier Calendar
2nd Cliff Smith Memorial Road Race
1999
1st 27th Severn Bridge Road Race
1st Silver Spoon 2 day, Premier Calendar

1st Stage 1, Silver Spoon 2 day, Premier Calendar

2005
21st L'Étape de la Déponce, 2 day stage race

21st Points Race, L'Étape de la Déponce
21st Stage 1, L'Étape de la Déponce
22nd Stage 1, L'Étape de la Déponce

2006
34th Welsh National Road Race Championships
2007
21st 'Presidents Trophy' Handicap Race
21st Race 1, Pembrey Criterium Series
21st Race 2, Pembrey Criterium Series
31st Race 1, South Wales Criterium Series
31st Race 2, South Wales Criterium Series
42nd Race 3, South Wales Criterium Series
2nd Race 1, CC Abergavenny Handicas series
93rd Noel Jones Memorial Road Race
