= Angharad Mason =

Racing cyclist

Personal information
- Full name: Angharad Mason
- Born: 14 May 1979 (age 47) Bridgend, Wales

Cycling career
- Sport: Cycling
- Discipline: Road
- Role: Rider

Amateur teams
- 2009: Forza Cycles Racing Team
- 2010–2011: Cardiff JIF
- 2012: For Viored Brookvex

Angharad Mason (born 14 May 1979) is a Welsh racing cyclist, sports injury specialist, chartered physiotherapist and acupuncturist from Bridgend, Wales. Mason represented Wales in the women's road race at the 2010 Commonwealth Games in Delhi.

Mason attended Ysgol Gyfun Llanhari before gaining a BSc Hons from the University of Salford in 2001, and spent ten years working as a physiotherapist. A keen athlete, Mason had already gained a karate black belt, run nine marathons and completed two triathlons before specialising in cycling.

== Palmarès ==
2009
2nd Welsh National Road Race Championships

2011
3rd Welsh National Road Race Championships
