= Thomas William Barker =

Welsh solicitor (1861–1912)

Thomas William Barker (12 May 1861 – 7 July 1912) was a Carmarthenshire solicitor, and registrar of the Diocese of St Davids. His father, J. H. Barker, was also a solicitor, and they worked together as partners of the firm Barker, Morris, and Barker.

He studied at the local Queen Elizabeth Grammar School and then at Harrow School.

In 1897 Thomas was appointed secretary to the Bishop of St Davids, and in 1899 was appointed registrar of the Diocese of St Davids, remaining in the position until his death in 1912. He compiled a four-volume work, Particulars relating to the endowments, etc., of livings in the diocese of S. Davids. He also published lists of incumbents from Pembrokeshire.

== Naturalist ==
Barker was the author of a natural history of Carmarthenshire:

- Barker, T.W. (1905). Handbook to the Natural History of Carmarthenshire. W. Spurrell.

The book was described as "useful" by Arthur Bennett in the Journal of Botany, British and Foreign.

He was a foundation member of the Carmarthenshire Antiquarian Society and Field Club. Upon his death, his collection of local insects and Roman coins found in Carmarthenshire were donated to the society.
