= Paul Sheppard =

Welsh racing cyclist

Personal information
- Full name: Paul Sheppard
- Born: 12 January 1978 (age 48) Newbridge, Wales

Cycling career
- Sport: Cycling
- Disciplines: Road and track
- Role: Rider

Amateur team
- Cwmcarn Paragon

Professional teams
- 2000: Linda McCartney
- 2003: 4BikesOnline.com

Paul Sheppard (born 12 January 1978 in Newbridge), is a Welsh racing cyclist. He represented Wales at 1998 Commonwealth Games in Kuala Lumpur where he came fourth in the Team Pursuit, he repeated this performance at the 2002 Commonwealth Games in Manchester.

== Palmarès ==
=== Track ===
1993
1st Pursuit British National Track Championships – Youth

1995
1st 20 km Scratch, British National Track Championships – Junior

1998
4th Team Pursuit, 4m28.664, Commonwealth Games (with Huw Pritchard, Alun Owen & Sion Jones)

2002
4th Team Pursuit, 4m25.029, Commonwealth Games (with Huw Pritchard, Will Wright & Joby Ingram-Dodd)

2004
1st Pursuit, Welsh National Track Championships
1st Team Sprint, Welsh National Track Championships

2005
1st Points Race, Welsh National Track Championships
1st Scratch Race, Welsh National Track Championships
1st Team Pursuit, Welsh National Track Championships

=== Road ===
2001
1st Welsh National Road Race Championships

2004
2nd Perfs Pedal Race
