= Sion Jones (cyclist) =

Welsh racing cyclist

Personal information
- Full name: Sion Jones
- Born: 1979 (age 46–47) St Asaph, Wales

Cycling career
- Sport: Cycling
- Disciplines: Road and track
- Role: Rider

Amateur team
- 1997: Harlow CC

Professional team
- 2000: Clarke Contracts RT, Harrods-Giant,

Sion Jones (born 1979) is a Welsh racing cyclist. He represented Wales at the 1998 Commonwealth Games in Kuala Lumpur. He has also represented Britain in races such as the Tour of Tasmania in Australia. He has been a multiple British national champion and a national record holder.

== Palmarès ==
1997
1st Team Pursuit 1997 British National Team Pursuit Championships
1998
4th Team Pursuit, 4m 28.664, Commonwealth Games (with Paul Sheppard, Alun Owen and Huw Pritchard)
2006
1st 20 km Scratch, Welsh National Track Championships
2nd Pursuit, Welsh National Track Championships
2nd Kilo, Welsh National Track Championships
