= Ian Jeremiah =

Welsh racing cyclist

Personal information
- Full name: Ian Jeremiah
- Nickname: Sticky / Honker
- Born: c. 1970 Wales

Cycling career
- Sport: Cycling
- Current team: Cardiff JIF
- Disciplines: Road, Cyclo-cross & MTB
- Role: Rider

Amateur team
- 1995-: Cardiff JIF

Major wins
- (Wales) Welsh Champion

Ian Jeremiah (born c.1970) is a Welsh racing cyclist and co-owner of Cyclopaedia cycle shop since 1994.

Jeremiah was born in Cardiff and was the Welsh National Cross Country MTB Champion in 1999 and 2001. He represented Wales at the 2002 Commonwealth Games in Manchester where he was disqualified for refusing a request for all lapped riders to pull out of the race in the final lap. Jeremiah has also represented Wales at many international stage races such as the 'Tour of Rhodes' in Greece and the 'Tour de Serbie' in Yugoslavia in 2002.

Through his business he supports the 'Cardiff JIF' (Cardiff Just in Front) cycling club since 1995. Members and previous members of the club include champions and professionals such as Geraint Thomas, Matt Beckett and Gareth Sheppard.

Jeremiah has a twin bike rider, who also rides for Cardiff JIF – 2nd cat rider Gareth Holtam.

== Palmarès ==
1999
1st (Wales) Welsh National Cross Country MTB Championships
2001
1st (Wales) Welsh National Cross Country MTB Championships
2002
2nd (Wales) Welsh National Cross Country MTB Championships
