= Percy Mansell Jones =

British writer (1889–1968)

Percy Mansell Jones (11 April 1889 - 24 January 1968) was a Welsh Professor of French.

He was born 11 April 1889 at Carmarthen to Arnaud Johnson Jones and his wife. He started his education at Queen Elizabeth Grammar School in Carmarthen before going on to gain a first-class honours degree in French in 1908 at Aberystwyth University. He later went on to achieving a master's degree. After his time at Aberystwyth, he attended Balliol College, Oxford, where he obtained a B.Litt.

He became a lecturer at various universities, specialising in French literature and history and modern French poetry. He obtained the position of lecturer at Aberystwyth University, University College of South Wales, Cambridge University and Cardiff. He was appointed Professor of French at Bangor University in 1937 and went on to hold the position of the first Professor of Modern French Literature at the University of Manchester in 1951. In 1960, he was honoured with an Hon. D.Litt degree from the University of Wales which was given to him soon after his retirement.

P Mansell Jones specialised in modern French poetry which provided a natural sensitivity and understanding to various French poets. For example, he studied poets such as Emile Verhaeren and Baudelaire. This is highlighted in his book The Oxford Book of French Verse, published in 1957. As well as a passion for French poetry, he wrote various essays highlighting his interest in understanding French thought and contemporary issues. These essays are: French Introspectives (1937), The Background of Modern French Poetry (1951) and Tradition and Barbarism (1930).

He died on 24 January 1968.
