= Herbert George =

Herbert John George

Herbert John George (1893 – 19 April 1939) was a Welsh chemist and a lecturer at the University of Oxford.

== Biography ==
=== Early life ===
George was educated at Cardiff High School and spent one session at University College, Cardiff before matriculating at Jesus College, Oxford in 1911 as a science scholar. He obtained a first-class degree in Natural Sciences in 1914.

=== Military life experience ===
At the outbreak of the First World War, he enlisted in the Royal Welch Fusiliers, reaching the rank of lieutenant and seeing service at Gallipoli, where he was wounded. His health suffered further when posted to Mesopotamia, and he was invalided home. He then worked in the explosives department of the Ministry of Munitions, and gained first-hand knowledge of modern methods for manufacturing heavy chemicals.

=== Life accomplishments ===
He was appointed by Jesus College as a Research Fellow and Lecturer in Chemistry in 1919, later becoming an Official Fellow and Tutor. He also held the college offices of Librarian, Junior Bursar and Senior Bursar. Within the university, he took charge of colloid chemistry and was appointed by Oxford University as one of its representatives on Oxford City Council. He was regarded as an authority on teaching science in schools, and was a member of committees in Wales and in Oxford controlling school examinations. His time for published work was limited by his other commitments, but he wrote on the absorption of gases on glass surfaces, on the theory of strong electrolytes and other subjects. He died on 19 April 1939 at the age of 46.
