= Huw Pritchard =

Welsh racing cyclist

Personal information
- Full name: Huw Pritchard
- Born: 7 January 1976 (age 50) Cardiff, Wales

Cycling career
- Sport: Cycling
- Disciplines: Road and track
- Role: Rider

Amateur team
- C C Cardiff, Harlow CC

Professional teams
- 1999: Men's Health
- 2000: Linda McCartney
- 2002–2003: Angliasport

Huw Pritchard (born 7 January 1976 in Cardiff, Wales), is a former Welsh racing cyclist. He represented Wales at the 1998 Commonwealth Games in Kuala Lumpur and again in Manchester in the 2002 Commonwealth Games, where he won the silver medal in the 20 km scratch, the first Welshman to win a medal on the track at the Games. Huw now works as a product designer.

== Palmarès ==
=== Track ===
1998
4th Team Pursuit, 4m28.664, Commonwealth Games (with Paul Sheppard, Alun Owen & Sion Jones)

1999
1st 20 km Scratch, British National Track Championships
2nd Points race, British National Track Championships

2002
2nd Madison, British National Track Championships (with Kieran Page, SP Systems)
2nd 20 km Scratch, Commonwealth Games
4th Points race, Commonwealth Games
4th Team Pursuit, 4m25.029, Commonwealth Games (with Paul Sheppard, Will Wright & Joby Ingram-Dodd)

2003
1st Madison, British National Track Championships (with James Taylor, City of Edinburgh RC)

=== Road ===
1997
1st British National Road Race Championships – U23
1999
1st Welsh National Road Race Championships
2nd Tour of Lancashire overall
2nd Manx International
2000
1st Stage 7, Tour of Serbia
2nd Lancaster Mercedes GP, Premier Calendar event
3rd Archer GP, Premier Calendar event
2002
1st Lincoln Grand Prix
2003
1st Welsh National Road Race Championships
