= Hannah Rich =

Welsh racing cyclist

Personal information
- Full name: Hannah Rich
- Born: 3 January 1991 (age 35) Undy, Monmouthshire, Wales

Cycling career
- Sport: Cycling
- Discipline: Road
- Role: Rider

Amateur teams
- 2006: Newport Velo Cycling Club
- 2007–2008: Node4 – Giordana Racing
- 2009–: Matrix Fitness – Prendas

Hannah Rich (born 3 January 1991) is a Welsh racing cyclist from Undy near Caldicot, Monmouthshire, Wales. Rich represented Wales in the Women's points and scratch races at the 2010 Commonwealth Games in Delhi, where she finished 14th and 6th respectively.

Rich began cycling in 2006, having previously done trampolining at Newport Velodrome and liked the look of track cycling, so joined Newport Velo Cycling Club before being spotted by the Welsh Cycling Talent Team.

== Palmarès ==
2006
2nd Points race, British National Track Championships – Under 16

2008
1st (United Kingdom) Scratch race, British National Track Championships
2nd British National Derny Championships

2009
1st (Wales) Welsh National Road Race Championships
1st (United Kingdom) Points race, British National Track Championships – Junior

2010
3rd Welsh National Road Race Championships

2011
1st (Wales) Welsh National Road Race Championships
3rd British National Circuit Race Championships
