= Joby Ingram-Dodd =

Personal information
- Full name: Joby Ingram-Dodd
- Born: 14 July 1980 (age 46)

Cycling career
- Sport: Cycling
- Discipline: Track
- Role: Rider

Amateur teams
- CC Cardiff
- Yasumitsu Schlapp

Joby Ingram-Dodd (born 14 July 1980), is a former Welsh racing cyclist. He represented Wales at the 2002 Commonwealth Games in Manchester. He has now moved on to become an actor, writer and producer. Currently working for Space Dive Productions Limited, his involved with a number of projects including 2 feature films and 3 TV series.

== Palmarès ==
2002
3rd British National Tandem Sprint Championships
4th British National Madison Championships (with Mark Cooper)
4th Team Pursuit, 4m25.029, Commonwealth Games (with Huw Pritchard, Will Wright & Paul Sheppard)
2005
4th 400m, British National Grass Track Championships
3rd Team Sprint, British National Track Championships (with Ian Sharpe & Jay Hollingsworth)
2006
4th British National Tandem Sprint Championships with Ellen Hunter
