= The Poppies (Welsh band) =

Welsh rock band

The Poppies were a Welsh rock band which was active during the mid-2000s. Many of the band songs were in the Welsh language.

== Band history ==
In early 2003, Sam James (guitar and vocals), Twm Champagne (drums) and Eifion Austin (bass) met and formed The Poppies in Aberystwyth. Austin, originally from Morriston in Swansea was a first year politics student at Aberystwyth University while Champagne (from Carmarthen) studied Film & TV. James was still studying at the local Welsh comprehensive Ysgol Gyfun Penweddig.

The band's first gig was held in Aberystwyth in 2003. They quickly gained support from Radio 1 DJ's Huw Stephens and Bethan Elfyn and often appeared on S4C's Welsh language music programme Bandit.

During 2005, the band recorded a Maida Vale session for Steve Lamacq's BBC Radio 1 programme and released the Dau Bys EP on the Ciwdod label. They also won the 'Best Live Act' at the Radio Cymru Awards and 'Best Welsh Language Act' at The Pop Factory Awards. Around this time ex-Catatonia guitarist Owen Powell became the band's manager.

In the summer of 2005 the band moved to Splott in Cardiff where they shared a house. In early 2006, Champagne was replaced by Gethin Jones, a jazz student at Cardiff's Royal College of Music and Drama. The band focused on recording English language material from this point onwards and lost much of the support they had initially found in the Welsh language scene. This culminated in a popular Welsh language music magazine labelling the group traitors to the Welsh language. Copies of the magazine (which had photos of the band on the cover) were then ritually burned at the National Eisteddfod annually, as this level of betrayal is hard to forgive and memories live long in the principality.

Failing to secure a recording contract the band began to gig less as James toured as bassist with The Heights, Jones concentrated on his jazz studies and Austin played bass for The Spencer McGarry Season. The band split up in late 2007. James moved to London with members of The Heights to form 'Rogues', while Jones and Austin formed 'Avash Avash'.

James is an ex-member of the bands Mozz, The Dancing Bullets, The Heights and Rogues. In 2010 he sang lead vocals on Example's UK top ten single "Won't Go Quietly". He is the organiser of the Castell Rock festival in Aberystwyth.

Austin went on to play with a number of bands including Alun Gaffey and latterly, Ynys. He worked on an acid jazz/shoegaze/indie fusion album under the name Cleifion.

Jones is a professional jazz drummer in London who fits kitchen worktops in his spare time.
