= Lily Matthews =

Lily Brickman (Matthews)
Personal information
- Full name: Lily Brickman
- Born: Builth Wells, Wales

Cycling career
- Sport: Cycling
- Disciplines: Mountain bike and road
- Role: Rider

Amateur team
- 2009–2010, 2011: 100% ME

Lily Matthews is a Welsh racing cyclist from Builth Wells, Wales. She was on the Great Britain Olympic Academy Cycling Team from 2008-2011. Matthews began competing in mountain biking aged 17 and went on to represent Great Britain in the under-23 cross-country race at the 2010 UCI Mountain Bike & Trials World Championships and Wales in the Women's road race at the 2010 Commonwealth Games in Delhi.

Matthews was due to begin studying a degree in medicine in 2008 at Cardiff University, but deferred her place to concentrate on her sporting career.

== Palmarès ==
2011 Key Results

15th UCI Mountain bike World Cup Under 23 Dalby Forest

2010 Key Results

1st Overall British Mountain bike Series
3rd GP MTB XC Beringen, Belgium
1st (Wales) Welsh National Road Race Championships
1st British National Under 23 Mountain bike Championships Pippingford Park
8th European Under 23 Mountain bike Championships Israel
21st World Under 23 Mountain bike Championship, Canada

2009 key Results

25th World Under 23 Mountain Bike Championships Canberra, Australia
6th British Elite Mountain Bike Marathon Championships Margam Park, Wales
2nd British Under 23 National Mountain Bike Championships, Innerleithen
5th British National Cyclocross Championships, Bradford
