= Thomas Dafydd =

Welsh elegist and hymnist

Thomas Dafydd was an 18th-century Welsh elegist and hymn writer.

Dafydd may have come from Llanegwad, Carmarthenshire. Between 1765 and 1792, he published approximately 20 booklets of hymns and elegies described prominent Methodists of his day.
