= Grant Gardiner =

Australian cricketer (born 1965)

Personal information
- Born: 26 February 1965 (age 61); Melbourne, Australia

Domestic team information
- Years: Team
- 1994-1998: Victoria
- Source: Cricinfo, 10 December 2015

Grant Gardiner (born 26 February 1965) is an Australian former cricketer. He played 20 first-class cricket matches for Victoria between 1994 and 1998. He was the first batsman reach one thousand runs in a season in Victorian District Cricket since its inception in 1906/07.

== See also ==
- List of Victoria first-class cricketers
