= Dai Maesmor =

Welsh harpist (fl. 16th-century)

Dai Maesmor was a 16th-century Welsh harpist. He is known to have graduated in music at the Caerwys Eisteddfod held on 2 July 1523.
