= Arwel Richards =

British polo administrator (born 1982)

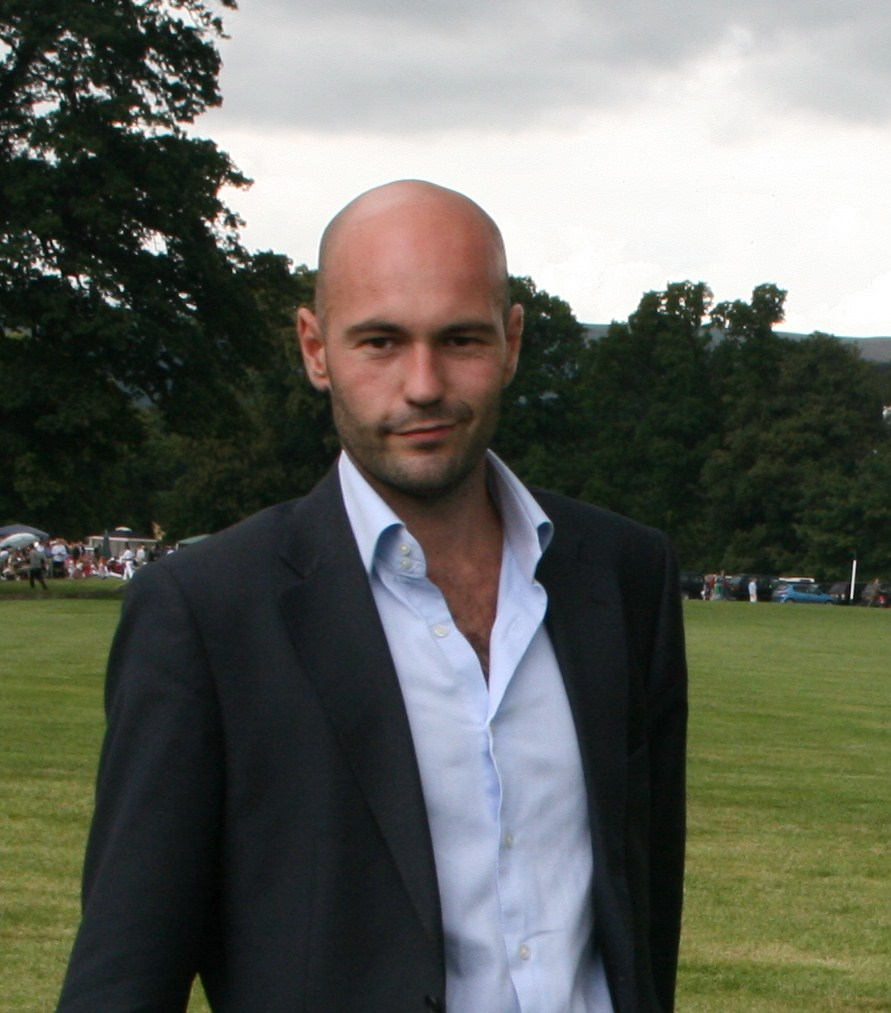
- Born: Arwel Wyn Richards; January 25, 1982 (age 44); Carmarthen, Carmarthenshire, Wales
- Known for: St. Davids Polo and Racing Club, columnist, Classic cars, stammering

Arwel Wyn Richards (born 25 January 1982 in Carmarthen) is a Welsh businessman and columnist contributing articles on cars and style.

He has been involved in the Welsh polo scene since 2006. As tournament director of the St. Davids Polo and Racing Club, Wales' only polo club, he hosted a beach polo day in Swansea Bay in August 2009.

From 2007 to 2009 Richards was Festival Director of the Swansea Bay Film Festival. Catherine Zeta-Jones and Michael Sheen were Patron and Vice President, respectively, during his tenure.

Since 2014 he has been a classic car specialist at the Iconic Auctioneers group (formerly known as Silverstone Auctions) owned by Nick Whale. He specialises in celebrity cars. Richards represented a 1985 Ford Escort RS Turbo S1 that was driven by the late Diana, Princess of Wales, it sold under the hammer for £650,000 on 27 August 2022.

Arwel Richards has a controlled stammer and is a patron of the British Stammering Association.
