= Will Wright (cyclist) =

Welsh cyclist (born 1973)

Personal information
- Full name: Will Wright
- Nickname: Willie Feet
- Born: 4 July 1973 (age 53)

Cycling career
- Sport: Cycling
- Current team: Will's Wheels Cycling Club
- Disciplines: Road and track
- Role: Rider

Amateur teams
- 1970s: Manchester Velo
- 1990s: ATOM Elite
- 1996: Marston's Low C/Wales
- 2002-: Will's Wheels Cycling Club

Will Wright (born 4 July 1973) is a Welsh racing cyclist, he has twice represented Wales in the Commonwealth Games, and is also the proprietor of the Stockport based cycle retailer.

Will began cycling in his early teens, joining 'Manchester Velo' on their weekly club runs each Sunday, but only once he had completed his paper round. The nickname given to him then was Willie Feet due to his unusually large feet.

After finishing his secondary education, Will went to work for 'Marple Cyclesport'. Having gained some success whilst racing, Wright was selected to represent Wales at the Commonwealth Games in Victoria, British Columbia, Canada, in 1994. It was there at the Games that Wright rode his first track competition, having never before ridden the track. He competed in the Games once more, closer to home in Manchester in 2002, but fell during the men's points race final after hitting a fallen rider.

Will took over 'Bardsley Cycles' at 482 Manchester Road, Stockport, Greater Manchester, in the 1990s, which was subsequently renamed 'Will's Wheels' which also sponsors it's eponymous cycling club, 'Will's Wheels Cycling Club'. As well the cycling club, Will's Wheels supports local cycle races by providing prizes which Wright himself has been known to present Will retired from competitive cycling to spend time with daughters Emily and Megan, and wife Sarah.

== Palmarès ==
1996
3rd Stage 1, Thwaites Grand Prix/Tour of Lancashire
2002
4th Team Pursuit, 4m25.029, Commonwealth Games (with Paul Sheppard, Huw Pritchard and Joby Ingram-Dodd)
2005
2nd Welsh National Road Race Championships
