= Paul Esposti =

Welsh cyclist (born 1972)

Personal information
- Full name: Paul Esposti
- Nickname: Spoti
- Born: 1 November 1972 (age 53) Cardiff, Wales
- Height: 1.74 m (5 ft 9 in)
- Weight: 67 kg (148 lb)

Cycling career
- Sport: Cycling
- Current team: Team Legacy Energy
- Discipline: Road
- Role: Rider
- Rider type: All-rounder

Amateur teams
- 1995: Cwmcarn Paragon RC
- 1996–1997: UVA Troyes
- 1998: ACBB
- 2005: HART Racing
- 2006: Rio Grande
- 2010: BCV Scion

Major wins
- Paris-Auxerre, France

Paul Esposti (born 1 November 1972) is a Welsh racing cyclist, from Cardiff, Wales. who finished 5th in the Road Race at the 1998 Commonwealth Games in Kuala Lumpur. He now lives in Colorado, United States.

== Palmarès ==
1994
7th (United Kingdom) British National Road Race Championships

1995
1st (Wales) Welsh National Road Race Championships
8th (United Kingdom) British National Road Race Championships

1996
1st Paris-Auxerre (France)

1997

9th (United Kingdom) British National Road Race Championships

1st Stage 4, Tour de Haute Marne (France)

1998
5th (Malaysia) 1998 Commonwealth Games road race, Kuala Lumpur
1st Final Classification Tour de Haute Marne (France)

1999
4th (United Kingdom) British National Circuit Race Championships
1st Stage 3, Tour of Lancashire, Premier Calendar Event
2nd Tour of the Cotswolds, Premier Calendar Event
2nd Five Valleys GP, Premier Calendar Event
3rd Stage 12, Commonwealth Bank Classic (Australia)
4th Stage 1, Commonwealth Bank Classic (Australia)

2004
1st Deer Trail Road Race
1st Golden Criterium
1st Estees Cycling Challenge

2005
1st Boulder-Roubaix
1st Louisville Criterium
1st Stage 4, Amateur Tour of the Gila
4th Amateur Tour of the Gila

2008
8th (United States) US Elite National Criterium Championships

2009
5th (United States) US Elite National Road Race Championships
1st Bannock Street Criterium Masters

2010
10th (United Kingdom) British Road Race Championships
18th (India) Commonwealth Games Road Race, Delhi
1st Colorado Masters Road Championships
1st Bannock Street Criterium Masters
1st Prairie Center Criterium Masters
1st Sunshine Hill Climb Masters
1st BRC Real Estate Criterium Masters
1st Wheels of Thunder
