= Kara Chesworth =

Personal information
- Full name: Kara Jane Chesworth
- Born: 4 January 1972 (age 54) Portsmouth, England, United Kingdom

Cycling career
- Sport: Cycling
- Current team: Dysynni Cycling Club
- Discipline: Road
- Role: Rider

Amateur teams
- 2007–2010: Dysynni Cycling Club
- 2011–: For Viored Brookvex

Kara Jane Chesworth (née Francis; born 4 January 1972 in Portsmouth, England) is an English-born Welsh racing cyclist. She represented Wales at the 2010 Commonwealth Games.

Chesworth took up cycling in 2005 in order to get fit, and first competed in a circuit race in Tywyn in 2007. She placed 8th in the 2010 British Women's road race championships, and won the British women's road race series.

== Palmarès ==
2007
1st (Wales) Welsh National Circuit Race Championships

2008
1st (Wales) Welsh National Circuit Race Championships

2009
1st (Wales) Welsh National Circuit Race Championships

2010
1st British Women's Road Series
2nd Welsh National Road Race Championships
