= Beach polo =

Variant of arena polo

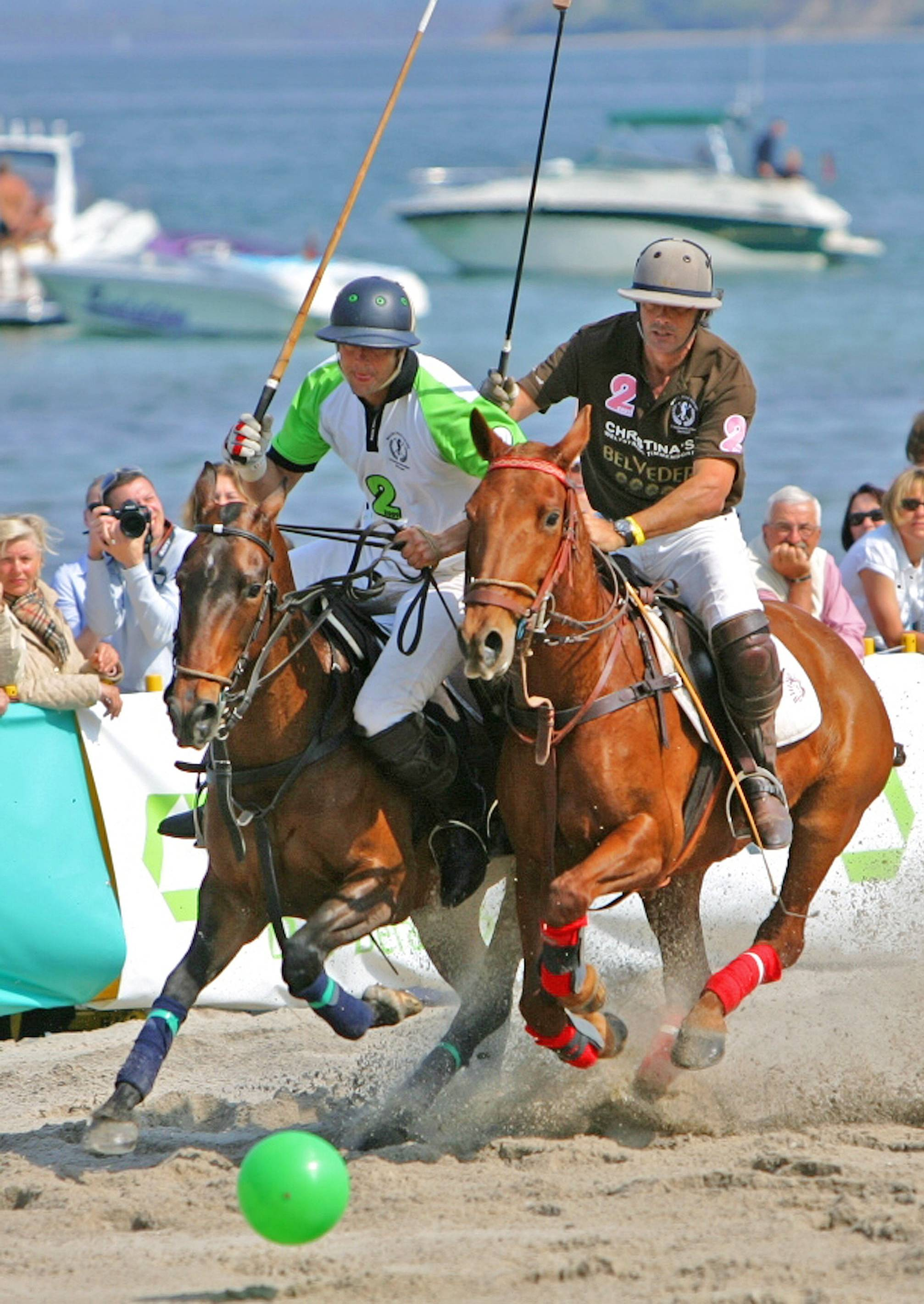
Beach polo in Timmendorfer Strand, Germany

Beach polo is a team sport and close variant of arena polo.

== Game play ==
A game of beach polo consists of two three-player teams as opposed to the usual four-player teams in field polo. A game consists of four seven-minute periods of play, called chukkers. The game is played in an enclosed sand arena with sideboards of approximately four feet in height, designed to keep the ball in play. Depending on playing areas available, some of the playing arenas have enclosed ends while others allow for 20 yards of run out room for the horses, past the end line, and utilize standing goal posts.

Two umpires are suggested for tournament play which may be stationed outside the arena to officiate the game. Penalties are called and resulting free hits are awarded to the fouled party.

Traditional polo ponies are used with players changing horses following each chukker.

Unlike the hard plastic ball used in field polo, beach polo employs a leather or rubber inflated ball no less than 12.5 inches in circumference. Other equipment employed is the same as that used in field or arena polo.

== History ==
Reto Gaudenzi and Rashid Al Habtoor have been credited with the creation of the game in 2004 in Dubai, followed by the Miami Beach Polo World Cup in the United States in 2005 which also was created by Reto Gaudenzi and his son Tito. Reto Gaudenzi is also the inventor of Snow Polo that initiated in 1985 on the frozen lake of St. Moritz. Additional tournaments matches have arisen in Argentina, Australia, Austria, Belgium, Chile, China, Colombia, Croatia, England, France, Germany, India, Italy, Mexico, New Zealand, Poland, Spain, Thailand, The Netherlands, Uruguay and Wales.

The most notable event of this kind continues to take place annually in Miami Beach. Having featured some of the best international polo players include Argentine 10-goaler Gonzalo Pieres, 8-goaler Alejandro Novillo Astrada, Mexico's late Carlos Gracida (9), USA's 9-goaler Nic Roldan amongst many more. This event is organized by Tito Gaudenzi and Melissa Ganzi to this day.

The island of Jersey (off the coast of Normandy, France) staged its first beach polo tournament in September 2012 while New Zealand staged a tournament in December 2013, and Croatia created their first beach polo event in 2016.
