= 2004 World Outdoor Bowls Championship – Women's fours =

Lawn bowls event

World Outdoor Championship 2004 women's fours
- 10th World Outdoor Bowls Championships
- Location: Leamington Spa, England
- Date(s): 3–17 September 2004
- Category: World Bowls Championship

The 2004 World Outdoor Bowls Championship women's fours was held at Victoria Park, Leamington Spa in England.

Originally the championships were going to take place in Kuala Lumpur, Malaysia during 2003 but due to political reasons it was moved to England the following year.

Jayne Christie, Jean Baker, Amy Monkhouse and Ellen Falkner of England won the fours gold medal.

== Section tables ==
First round 4 sections, top two teams qualify for quarter finals.

=== Section A ===
Pos	Player	P	W	D	L	Pts	Shots
1	(Wales) Caroline Taylor, Linda Evans, Anwen Butten, Kathy Pearce	6	5	0	1	10	+65
2	(New Zealand) Jo Edwards, Sharon Sims, Val Smith, Wendy Jensen	6	5	0	1	10	+50
3	(Malaysia) Haslah Hassan, Azlina Arshad, Nor Hashimah Ismail	6	4	0	2	8	+20
4	(Hong Kong) Grace Chu, Elizabeth Li, Stephanie Chung & Angela Chau	6	3	0	3	6	-24
5	(Botswana) Tirelo Buckley, Ivy Morton, Lynda Houghton, Sheila Spring	6	2	0	4	4	-24
6	(Guernsey) Eunice Trebert, Anne Simon, Gwen de la Mare,& Jean Simon	6	1	0	5	2	-26
7	(Japan) Kyoko Raita, Hiroko Mori, Yoko Goda, Nanami Yoshimoto	6	1	0	5	2	-83

=== Section B ===
Pos	Player	P	W	D	L	Pts	Shots
1	(England) Jayne Christie, Jean Baker, Amy Monkhouse, Ellen Falkner	6	6	0	0	12	+85
2	(Scotland) Susan Murray, Joyce Dickey, Cecilia Smith, Joyce Lindores	6	4	0	2	8	+44
3	Barbara Cameron, Phyllis Brett	6	3	1	2	7	+13
4	(Fiji) Litia Tikoisuva, Sainiana Walker, Salanieta Gukivuli,	6	3	0	3	6	+14
5	(Canada) Shirley Fitzpatrick-Wong, Helen Culley, Anita Nivala, Andrea Stadnyk	6	2	0	4	4	-15
6	(Isle of Man) Jean Radcliffe, Pauleen Kelly, Val Robins, Janet Monk	6	1	1	4	3	-43
7	(Thailand) Rosarina Sommani, Kulwadee Phonghanyudh, Valchatna Sudasna, Jintana Visanuvimol	6	1	0	5	2	-98

=== Section C ===
Pos	Player	P	W	D	L	Pts	Shots
1	(Philippines) Rella Catallan, Rosita Bradborn, Ronalyn Greenlees, Milagros Witheridge	6	6	0	0	12	+38
2	(South Africa) Trish Steyn, Jill Hackland, Loraine Victor, Leone du Rand	6	4	0	2	8	+39
3	(Australia) Jenny Harragon, Maria Rigby, Katrina Wright, Roma Dunn	6	4	0	2	8	+37
4	(Israel) Tami Kamzel, Carmel Scop, Tzila Gavish, Irit Grenchel	6	3	0	3	6	-4
5	(Netherlands) Ineke Nagtegaal, Leny Peek,	6	2	0	4	4	-25
6	(United States) Mary Delisle, Maryna Hyland, Irene Webster, Kathy Vea	6	2	0	4	4	-28
7	(Spain) Val Sherry, Margaret Maltby, Pat Young,	6	0	0	6	0	-57

=== Section D ===
Pos	Player	P	W	D	L	Pts	Shots
1	(Jersey) Christine Grimes, Suzie Dingle, Gean O'Neil, Karina Bisson	6	6	0	0	12	+50
2	(Zambia) Margaret Mponda, Beverly Gondwe, Eddah Mpezeni, Beatrice Mali	6	4	0	2	8	+38
3	(Eswatini) Karin Byars, Jacqueline Reeve,	6	4	0	2	8	+31
4	(Namibia) Mary Nasilowski, Ellen Boettger, Charlotte Morland, Joy Howes	6	2	0	4	4	-5
5	(Zimbabwe) Linda Farrell, M Gurr	6	2	0	4	4	-10
6	(India) Bonani Framjee, Shashi Chhabra,	6	2	0	4	4	-42
7	(Portugal) G Palmer, Rhona Robertson	6	1	0	5	2	-62

== Finals ==
Play Offs
England	33
Zambia	8
Wales	15
South Africa	13
Jersey	16
New Zealand	12
Scotland	37
Philippines	1

Semifinals
England	17
Wales	16
Jersey	15
Scotland	14

Gold medal
England	23
Jersey	10
Third place
Wales	15
Scotland	12

== Results ==
Women's fours section A
Round 1 – Sep 11		
New Zealand	Japan	27–9
Wales	Guernsey	24–12
Malaysia	Botswana	19–11
Round 2 – Sep 12		
New Zealand	Wales	17–16
Malaysia	Hong Kong	15–13
Japan	Guernsey	17–16
Round 3 – Sep 12		
New Zealand	Hong Kong	27–9
Wales	Malaysia	15–14
Botswana	Japan	18–13
Round 4 – Sep 13		
Malaysia	New Zealand	16–13
Wales	Hong Kong	30–4
Botswana	Guernsey	20–11
Round 5 – Sep 13		
New Zealand	Botswana	19–6
Guernsey	Malaysia	23–13
Hong Kong	Japan	35–6
Round 6 – Sep 14		
Wales	Japan	27–13
Hong Kong	Botswana	16–12
New Zealand	Guernsey	19–16
Round 7 – Sep 14		
Malaysia	Japan	26–8
Wales	Botswana	19–6
Hong Kong	Guernsey	20–9

Women's fours section B
Round 1 – Sep 11		
England	Thailand	30–5
Scotland	Isle of Man	30–9
Fiji	Ireland	22–6
Round 2 – Sep 12		
Ireland	Scotland	15–13
England	Canada	25–5
Fiji	Isle of Man	18–12
Round 3 – Sep 12		
Scotland	Canada	20–15
England	Ireland	18–14
Thailand	Isle of Man	17–16
Round 4 – Sep 13		
Ireland	Canada	22–9
England	Scotland	20–14
Fiji	Thailand	30–14
Round 5 – Sep 13		
Scotland	Thailand	28–7
England	Fiji	23–12
Isle of Man	Canada	19–15
Round 6 – Sep 14		
Ireland	Isle of Man	15–15
Canada	Thailand	28–9
Scotland	Fiji	17–12
Round 7 – Sep 14		
England	Isle of Man	30–11
Ireland	Thailand	32–14
Canada	Fiji	17–9

Women's fours section C
Round 1 – Sep 11		
Philippines	Australia	14–13
South Africa	Netherlands	24–11
Israel	Spain	17–10
Round 2 – Sep 12		
Israel	Australia	15–14
South Africa	United States	22–17
Philippines	Spain	24–9
Round 3 – Sep 12		
Australia	United States	24–8
South Africa	Israel	24–11
Philippines	Netherlands	22–15
Round 4 – Sep 13		
Australia	South Africa	22–17
Netherlands	Spain	15–11
Israel	United States	19–13
Round 5 – Sep 13		
Australia	Netherlands	21–13
South Africa	Spain	24–6
Philippines	United States	16–9
Round 6 – Sep 14		
Australia	Spain	28–18
Philippines	Israel	17–14
United States	Netherlands	21–18
Round 7 – Sep 14		
Philippines	South Africa	17–12
Netherlands	Israel	15–13
United States	Spain	15–12

Women's fours section D
Round 1 – Sep 11		
Jersey	Portugal	24–11
Namibia	Zimbabwe	16–12
India	Zambia	15–14
Round 2 – Sep 12		
Jersey	Zimbabwe	16–12
Zambia	(Eswatini) Swaziland	23–14
Namibia	Portugal	23–10
Round 3 – Sep 12		
Jersey	(Eswatini) Swaziland	19–13
Zambia	Zimbabwe	26–9
Portugal	India	29–12
Round 4 – Sep 13		
Jersey	Zambia	24–11
(Eswatini) Swaziland	Zimbabwe	15–13
India	Namibia	21–9
Round 5 – Sep 13		
Jersey	India	24–12
Zambia	Namibia	19–18
(Eswatini) Swaziland	Portugal	24–5
Round 6 – Sep 14		
Jersey	Namibia	16–14
Zimbabwe	Portugal	21–12
(Eswatini) Swaziland	India	29–11
Round 7 – Sep 14		
Zambia	Portugal	31–6
Zimbabwe	India	23–15
(Eswatini) Swaziland	Namibia	17–10
