= 2004 World Outdoor Bowls Championship – Women's triples =

Lawn bowls event

World Outdoor Championship 2004 women's triples
- 10th World Outdoor Bowls Championships
- Location: Leamington Spa, England
- Date(s): 3 September-17 September 2004
- Category: World Bowls Championship

The 2004 World Outdoor Bowls Championship women's triples was held at Victoria Park, Leamington Spa in England.

Originally the championships were going to take place in Kuala Lumpur, Malaysia, during 2003, but due to political reasons it was moved to England the following year.

Trish Steyn, Jill Hackland and Loraine Victor of South Africa won the triples gold medal.

== Section tables ==
First round 4 sections, top two teams qualify for quarter finals.

=== Section A ===
Pos	Player	P	W	D	L	Pts	Shots
1	(New Zealand) Marlene Castle, Wendy Jensen, Val Smith	6	5	0	1	10	+28
2	(Jersey) Christine Grimes, Alison Camacho, Suzie Dingle	6	4	0	2	8	+2
3	(Zambia) Beverly Gondwe, Hilda Luipa, Beatrice Mali	6	3	0	3	6	+12
4	(Eswatini) Karin Byars,	6	3	0	3	6	+12
5	(Israel) Tami Kamzel, Carmel Scop, Irit Grenchel	6	3	0	3	6	+1
6	(Japan) Nanami Yoshimoto, Kyoko Raita, Junko Tahara	6	2	0	4	4	-30
7	(Guernsey) Gwen de la Mare, Jean Simon, Jacqueline Nicolle	6	1	0	5	2	-25

=== Section B ===
Pos	Player	P	W	D	L	Pts	Shots
1	(England) Jayne Christie, Jean Baker, Shirley Page	6	6	0	0	12	+79
2	(Botswana) Tirelo Buckley, Ivy Morton, Lynda Houghton	6	5	0	1	10	+26
3	(Wales) Linda Evans, Anwen Butten, Kathy Pearce	6	3	0	3	6	+49
4	(Spain) Val Sherry, Margaret Maltby,	6	3	0	3	6	+4
5	(Netherlands) Ineke Nagtegaal,	6	2	0	4	4	-45
6	(India) Bonani Framjee,	6	1	0	5	2	-20
7	(Isle of Man) Jean Radcliffe, Pauleen Kelly, Janet Monk	6	1	0	5	2	-93

=== Section C ===
Pos	Player	P	W	D	L	Pts	Shots
1	(Australia) Katrina Wright, Jenny Harragon, Roma Dunn	6	5	1	0	11	+66
2	(United States) Maryna Hyland, Irene Webster, Kathy Vea	6	4	1	1	9	+20
3	(Malaysia) Haslah Hassan, Siti Zalina Ahmad	6	4	0	2	8	+24
4	Barbara Cameron,	6	3	0	3	6	-10
5	(Philippines) Carmen Anderson, Rella Catallan, Rosita Bradborn	6	2	0	4	4	-15
6	(Hong Kong) Elizabeth Li, Stephanie Chung, Angela Chau	6	2	0	4	4	-39
7	(Zimbabwe) M Gurr	6	0	0	6	0	-46

=== Section D ===
Pos	Player	P	W	D	L	Pts	Shots
1	(Canada) Helen Culley, Anita Nivala, Andrea Stadnyk	6	5	1	0	11	+40
2	(South Africa) Trish Steyn, Jill Hackland, Loraine Victor	6	5	0	1	10	+67
3	(Scotland) Cecilia Smith, Joyce Dickey, Susan Murray	6	4	0	2	8	+48
4	(Fiji) Salanieta Gukivuli, Radhika Prasad,	6	3	0	3	6	-6
5	(Thailand) Kulwadee Phonghanyudh, Valchatna Sudasna, Jintana Visanuvimol	6	2	0	4	4	-19
6	(Namibia) Ellen Boettger, Charlotte Morland, Joy Howes	6	1	0	5	2	-68
7	(Portugal) G Palmer	6	0	1	5	1	-62

== Finals ==
Play Offs
South Africa	19
England	16
New Zealand	18
United States	14
Australia	16
Botswana	14
Canada	23
Jersey	11

Semifinals
South Africa	20
New Zealand	13
Australia	19
Canada	16

Gold medal
South Africa	21
Australia	11
Third place
New Zealand	24
Canada	7

== Results ==
Women's triples section A
Round 1 – Sep 3		
New Zealand	Japan	25–9
Jersey	Zambia	16–11
Guernsey	Israel	17–12
Round 2 – Sep 4		
Israel	New Zealand	23–14
Japan	Guernsey	22–18
Jersey	(Eswatini) Swaziland	17–14
Round 3 – Sep 5		
New Zealand	(Eswatini) Swaziland	18–15
Zambia	Japan	22–16
Israel	Jersey	27–10
Round 4 – Sep 5		
New Zealand	Jersey	18–9
Israel	(Eswatini) Swaziland	15–14
Zambia	Guernsey	29–16
Round 5 – Sep 6		
New Zealand	Zambia	22–15
Jersey	Guernsey	18–10
(Eswatini) Swaziland	Japan	18–7
Round 6 – Sep 7		
New Zealand	Guernsey	18–16
Japan	Israel	19–8
(Eswatini) Swaziland	Zambia	21–16
Round 7 – Sep 8		
Jersey	Japan	27–15
Zambia	Israel	25–15
(Eswatini) Swaziland	Guernsey	21–18

Women's triples section B
Round 1 – Sep 3		
Botswana	India	21–11
Wales	Netherlands	23–8
England	Isle of Man	19–15
Round 2 – Sep 4		
England	India	28–8
Spain	Wales	18–16
Botswana	Isle of Man	22–9
Round 3 – Sep 5		
Wales	India	24–11
England	Spain	24–11
Netherlands	Isle of Man	22–11
Round 4 – Sep 5		
England	Wales	21–13
Spain	India	17–13
Botswana	Netherlands	20–15
Round 5 – Sep 6		
England	Netherlands	25–7
Botswana	Wales	15–10
Isle of Man	Spain	14–13
Round 6 – Sep 7		
England	Botswana	22–6
India	Isle of Man	37–7
Spain	Netherlands	29–8
Round 7 – Sep 8		
Wales	Isle of Man	41–5
Netherlands	India	16–13
Botswana	Spain	20–11

Women's triples section C
Round 1 – Sep 3		
Ireland	United States	19–16
Malaysia	Hong Kong	30–11
Australia	Philippines	26–15
Round 2 – Sep 4		
Australia	Malaysia	20–10
Hong Kong	Philippines	18–15
Ireland	Zimbabwe	17–14
Round 3 – Sep 5		
Australia	Zimbabwe	22–7
Malaysia	Ireland	20–11
United States	Philippines	20–16
Round 4 – Sep 5		
Australia	Ireland	19–12
Malaysia	Zimbabwe	18–14
United States	Hong Kong	19–13
Round 5 – Sep 6		
Australia	United States	17–17
Ireland	Hong Kong	17–15
Philippines	Zimbabwe	23–12
Round 6 – Sep 7		
Australia	Hong Kong	29–6
Malaysia	Philippines	22–12
United States	Zimbabwe	17–12
Round 7 – Sep 8		
Philippines	Ireland	15–13
United States	Malaysia	19–11
Hong Kong	Zimbabwe	18–10

Women's triples section D
Round 1 – Sep 3		
Scotland	Thailand	29–13
South Africa	Portugal	19–14
Canada	Fiji	20–8
Round 2 – Sep 4		
Canada	South Africa	17–14
Scotland	Namibia	29–9
Fiji	Portugal	19–8
Round 3 – Sep 5		
Thailand	Portugal	14–14
South Africa	Namibia	30–7
Canada	Scotland	16–13
Round 4 – Sep 5		
Canada	Namibia	17–9
Fiji	Thailand	29–13
South Africa	Scotland	22–8
Round 5 – Sep 6		
South Africa	Thailand	23–11
Scotland	Fiji	23–11
Namibia	Portugal	19–14
Round 6 – Sep 7		
South Africa	Fiji	24–8
Canada	Portugal	23–9
Thailand	Namibia	24–9
Round 7 – Sep 8		
Scotland	Portugal	33–6
Canada	Thailand	14–14
Fiji	Namibia	18–11
