= Lawn bowls at the 2002 Commonwealth Games =

- Venue: Heaton Park
- Location: Manchester, England
- Dates: 25 July – 4 August 2002

Lawn bowls at the 2002 Commonwealth Games was the 16th appearance of lawn bowls at the Commonwealth Games. Competition was held in Manchester, England, from 25 July until 4 August 2002.

The events took place in Heaton Park, which saw a £32 million regeneration project and included a new pavilion and four greens.

England topped the lawn bowls medal table by virtue of winning three gold medals.

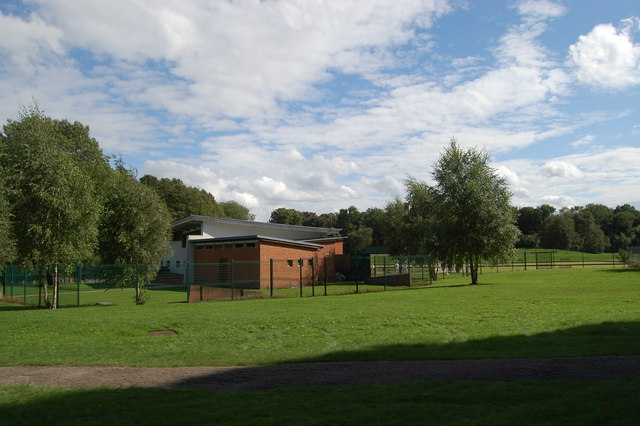
Heaton Park Bowls Club in 2011

== Medal table ==
* Host nation (England)

Rank	Nation	Gold	Silver	Bronze	Total
1	England	3	1	1	5
2	Scotland	2	0	0	2
3	South Africa	1	2	2	5
4	Malaysia	1	0	3	4
4	New Zealand	1	0	3	4
6	Wales	0	1	4	5
7	Australia	0	1	1	2
7	Canada	0	1	1	2
7	Northern Ireland	0	1	1	2
10	Zimbabwe	0	1	0	1
Totals (10 entries)		8	8	16	32

== Medallists ==
Event	Gold	Silver	Bronze	Bronze
Men's singles	(South Africa) Bobby Donnelly	(Northern Ireland) Jeremy Henry	(Wales) Robert Weale	(New Zealand) Mike Kernaghan
Men's pairs	(Scotland) Alex Marshall; George Sneddon	(England) Stephen Farish; Dean Morgan	(Malaysia) Mohamed Aziz Maswadi; Safuan Said	(South Africa) Shaun Addinall; Gerry Baker
Men's fours	(England) John Ottaway; Simon Skelton; Robert Newman; David Holt	(South Africa) Duanne Abrahams; Theuns Fraser; Kevin Campbell; Neil Burkett	(Wales) Ian Slade; Richard Bowen; Jason Greenslade; Dai Wilkins	(Northern Ireland) Michael Nutt; Noel Graham; Neil Booth; Jim Baker
Women's singles	(Malaysia) Siti Zalina Ahmad	(Australia) Karen Murphy	(South Africa) Lorna Trigwell	(New Zealand) Marlene Castle
Women's pairs	(New Zealand) Jo Edwards; Sharon Sims	(South Africa) Ellen Cawker; Jill Hackland	(Wales) Joanna Weale; Anwen Butten	(England) Lynne Whitehead; Amy Gowshall
Women's fours	(England) Ellen Alexander; Shirley Page; Gill Mitchell; Carol Duckworth	(Canada) Shirley Fitzpatrick-Wong; Andrea Weigand; Melissa Ranger; Anita Nivala	(Wales) Ann Sutherland; Pam John; Nina Shipperlee; Gill Miles	(New Zealand) Patsy Jorgensen; Jan Khan; Anne Lomas; Wendy Jensen

Para sport

Event	Gold	Silver	Bronze	Bronze
Men's Open Triplets	Scotland	Wales	Australia	Malaysia
Women's Blind Singles	(England) Ruth Small	(Zimbabwe) Constance Simbanda	(Canada) Vivian Barkley	(Malaysia) Mukri Mora

== Results ==
=== Men's singles ===
Section A

Pos	Player	P	W	L	F	A	Pts
1	(England) Mervyn King	4	3	1	77	60	6
2	(Zambia) Edward Nkole	4	3	1	70	71	6
3	(Canada) Ryan Bester	4	2	2	75	52	4
4	(Zimbabwe) Roy Garden	4	2	2	74	76	4
5	(Norfolk Island) Garry Ryan	4	0	4	47	84	0

Section B

Pos	Player	P	W	L	F	A	Pts
1	(Wales) Robert Weale	4	3	1	79	49	6
2	(New Zealand) Mike Kernaghan	4	3	1	63	43	6
3	(Cook Islands) Ieremia Tuteru	4	2	2	55	50	4
4	(Namibia) Douw Calitz	4	2	2	46	60	4
5	(Fiji) Albert Solomon	4	0	4	51	58	0

Section C

Pos	Player	P	W	L	F	A	Pts
1	(Northern Ireland) Jeremy Henry	5	5	0	105	59	10
2	(Scotland) Darren Burnett	5	4	1	104	65	8
3	(Jersey) Lee Nixon	5	3	2	78	70	6
4	(Kenya) Ian Stamp	5	2	3	72	87	4
5	(Eswatini) William James	5	1	4	86	99	2
6	(Malawi) Laurence Arthur	5	0	5	40	105	0

Section D

Pos	Player	P	W	L	F	A	Pts
1	(Australia) Steve Glasson	5	4	1	103	62	8
2	(South Africa) Bobby Donnelly	5	4	1	99	74	8
3	(Malaysia) Syed Mohamad Syed Akil	5	3	2	92	85	6
4	(Brunei) Abd Rahman Omar	5	3	2	86	84	6
5	(Guernsey) Ian Merrien	5	1	4	71	100	2
6	(Samoa) Ieremia Leautuli	5	0	5	59	105	0

Finals

Quarter-Final
(South Africa) Donnelly	21
(England) King	7
(Wales) Weale	21
(Scotland) Burnett	18
(Northern Ireland) Henry	21
(Zambia) Nkole	11
(New Zealand) Kernaghan	21
(Australia) Glasson	17

Semi-Final
(South Africa) Donnelly	21
(Wales) Weale	17
(Northern Ireland) Henry	21
(New Zealand) Kernaghan	13

Gold medal
(South Africa) Donnelly	21
(Northern Ireland) Henry	15

=== Men's pairs ===
Section A

Pos	Player	P	W	D	L	F	A	Pts
1	(England) Stephen Farish & Dean Morgan	6	4	0	2	100	58	8
2	(South Africa) Shaun Addinall & Gerry Baker	6	4	0	2	97	75	8
3	(Jersey) Alan Quemard & Thomas Greechan	6	4	0	2	99	82	8
4	(Australia) Andrew Smith & Kelvin Kerkow	6	4	0	2	77	80	8
5	(New Zealand) Russell Meyer & Paul Girdler	6	2	0	4	83	73	4
6	(Guernsey) Ralph Deakin & Simon Masterton	6	2	0	4	75	101	4
7	(Norfolk Island) Tim Sheridan & Gaetan Boudan	6	1	0	5	53	115	2

Section B

Pos	Player	P	W	D	L	F	A	Pts
1	(Scotland) Alex Marshall & George Sneddon	7	5	2	0	111	74	12
2	(Malaysia) Mohamed Aziz Maswadi & Safuan Said	7	3	2	2	111	82	8
3	(Northern Ireland) Martin McHugh & Gary McCloy	7	4	0	3	106	91	8
4	(Wales) Stephen Rees & Will Thomas	7	2	3	2	103	95	7
5	(Fiji) Curtis Mar & Keshwa Goundar	7	3	1	3	90	92	7
6	(Samoa) Faimanu Amituanai & Valovale Pritchard	7	3	1	3	82	95	7
7	(Brunei) Hj Rosli Ibrahim & Haji Naim Brahim	7	2	1	4	92	116	5
8	(Cook Islands) Inatio Akaruru & Noo Mataio	7	1	0	6	72	122	2

Finals

Quarter-Final
Scotland	14
Australia	9
South Africa	21
Northern Ireland	11
England	13
Wales	12
Malaysia	15
Jersey	14

Semi-Final
Scotland	15
South Africa	13
England	15
Malaysia	6

Gold medal
Scotland	12
England	10

=== Men's fours ===
Results

Men's fours section A
Round 1 - Jul 26		
Canada	Samoa	20-11
Guernsey	Norfolk Island	23-11
Round 2 - July 27		
Canada	Norfolk Island	24-6
Northern Ireland	Samoa	19-10
Round 3 - Jul 28		
Northern Ireland	Samoa	19-10
Canada	Guernsey	13-8
Round 4 - Jul 28		
Guernsey	Samoa	15-15
Northern Ireland	Canada	11-8
Round 5 - Jul 28		
Northern Ireland	Guernsey	21-11
Norfolk Island	Samoa	13-8

Men's fours section B
Round 1 - Jul 26		
Australia	Cook Islands	17-4
England	Malaysia	12-12
Round 2 - July 27		
England	Cook Islands	18-7
Australia	Malaysia	18-8
Round 3 - Jul 28		
England	Australia	19-9
Malaysia	Cook Islands	13-12

Men's fours section C
Round 1 - Jul 26		
South Africa	Brunei	18-15
Scotland	Fiji	18-16
Round 2 - July 27		
Brunei	Scotland	14-14
Fiji	South Africa	18-17
Round 3 - Jul 28		
Fiji	Brunei	15-11
South Africa	Scotland	19-7

Men's Fours section D
Round 1 - Jul 26		
Wales	Namibia	25-10
New Zealand	Malawi	15-11
Round 2 - July 27		
Wales	Malawi	26-4
New Zealand	Namibia	13-11
Round 3 - Jul 28		
Wales	New Zealand	17-15
Namibia	Malawi	11-9

Section A

Pos	Player	P	W	D	L	F	A	Pts
1	(Northern Ireland) Michael Nutt, Noel Graham, Neil Booth, Jim Baker	4	4	0	0	73	37	8
2	(Canada) Stephen Bezanson, John Devonshire, Keith Roney, Chris Stadnyk	4	3	0	1	63	36	6
3	(Guernsey) Len Le Ber, Paul Merrien, Paul Ingrouille, Bernard Simon	4	1	1	2	57	60	3
4	(Norfolk Island) Phil Billman, Gregory Hinks, Jim Rawlinson, Ron Campion	4	1	0	3	38	77	2
5	(Samoa) Talaimanu Keti, Tapusatele Tuatagaloa, Petelo Gabriel, Roderick Tyson	4	0	1	3	44	65	1

Section B

Pos	Player	P	W	D	L	F	A	Pts
1	(England) John Ottaway, Simon Skelton, Robert Newman, David Holt	3	2	1	0	49	28	5
2	(Australia) Brett Duprez, Gary Willis, Adam Jeffery, Rex Johnston	3	2	0	1	44	31	4
3	(Malaysia) Fairul Izwan Abd Muin, Attan lMutalib, Johari Jozaini, Sani Sazali	3	1	1	1	33	42	3
4	(Cook Islands) Vaine Henry, Dennis Tokorangi, Phillip Tangi, David Akaruru	3	0	0	3	23	48	0

Section C

Pos	Player	P	W	D	L	F	A	Pts
1	(South Africa) Duanne Abrahams, Theuns Fraser, Kevin Campbell, Neil Burkett	3	2	0	1	54	40	4
2	(Fiji) Arun Kumar, Sushil Sharma, Saijad Khan, Ratish Lal	3	1	0	1	49	46	4
3	(Scotland) David Peacock, Gary Mackie, Willie Wood, Graeme Archer	3	1	1	1	39	49	3
4	(Brunei) Salleh Chuchu Tuah, Tahir Haji Bohari, Amp Amp Kassim, Lokman Hj Salleh	3	0	1	2	40	47	1

Section D

Pos	Player	P	W	D	L	F	A	Pts
1	(Wales) Ian Slade, Richard Bowen, Jason Greenslade, Dai Wilkins	3	3	0	0	68	29	6
2	(New Zealand) Rowan Brassey, Sean Johnson, Peter Belliss, Andrew Curtain	3	2	0	1	43	38	4
3	(Namibia) Julian Viljoen, Sandy Joubert, Willem Esterhuizen Sr., Graham Snyman	3	1	0	2	32	47	2
4	(Malawi) Julian Arthur, David Hayes, Trevor King, Sandy Morrison	3	0	0	3	23	52	0

Finals

Quarter-Final
England	15
Fiji	11
Northern Ireland	15
New Zealand	12
South Africa	16
Canada	7
Wales	23
Australia	12

Semi-Final
England	16
Northern Ireland	9
South Africa	16
(Malaysia) Wales	13

Gold medal
England	22
South Africa	8

=== Women's singles ===
Section A

Pos	Player	P	W	L	F	A	Pts
1	(Northern Ireland) Margaret Johnston	4	3	1	79	42	3
2	(South Africa) Lorna Trigwell	4	3	1	79	63	3
3	(Scotland) Margaret Letham	4	3	1	74	65	3
4	(Malawi) Zelda Humphreys	4	1	3	59	73	1
5	(Papua New Guinea) Helwig Labia	4	0	4	36	84	0

Section B

Pos	Player	P	W	L	F	A	Pts
1	(Malaysia) Siti Zalina Ahmad	4	3	1	80	55	3
2	(Zimbabwe) Jane Rigby	4	3	1	79	73	3
3	(Kenya) Susan Kariuki	4	2	2	70	74	2
4	(Guernsey) Alison Merrien	4	1	3	66	74	1
5	(Canada) Laura Dewald	4	1	3	60	79	1

Section C

Pos	Player	P	W	L	F	A	Pts
1	(Jersey) Karina Horman	3	3	0	63	21	3
2	(England) Jean Baker	3	2	1	53	55	2
3	(Wales) Betty Morgan	3	1	2	48	60	1
4	(Cook Islands) Tremoana Damm	3	0	3	35	63	0

Section D

Pos	Player	P	W	L	F	A	Pts
1	(Australia) Karen Murphy	3	3	0	63	36	3
2	(New Zealand) Marlene Castle	3	2	1	53	30	2
3	(Fiji) Sainiana Walker	3	1	2	38	62	1
4	(Samoa) Lufilufi Taulealo	3	0	3	37	63	0

Finals

Quarter-Final
(Malaysia) Zalina	21
(England) Baker	14
(New Zealand) Castle	21
(Northern Ireland) Johnston	8
(Australia) Murphy	21
(Zimbabwe) Rigby	16
(South Africa) Trigwell	21
(Jersey) Horman	12

Semi-Final
(Malaysia) Zalina	21
(New Zealand) Castle	14
(Australia) Murphy	21
(South Africa) Trigwell	10

Gold medal
(Malaysia) Zalina	21
(Australia) Murphy	19

=== Women's pairs ===
Section A

Pos	Player	P	W	D	L	F	A	Pts
1	(Jersey) Alison Birch & Sheila Syvret	4	4	0	0	82	43	8
2	(Scotland) Margaret Russell & Joyce Lindores	4	3	0	1	71	46	6
3	(Zambia) Hilda Luipa & Beatrice Mali	4	2	0	2	54	59	4
4	(Brunei) Hajah Mohd Daud & Amalia Matali	4	1	0	3	47	66	2
5	(Norfolk Island) Zilpha Isobel Quintal & Kitha Bailey	4	0	0	4	38	78	0

Section B

Pos	Player	P	W	D	L	F	A	Pts
1	(New Zealand) Jo Edwards & Sharon Sims	4	3	1	0	80	50	7
2	(England) Lynne Whitehead & Amy Gowshall	4	3	0	1	74	38	6
3	(Isle of Man) Maureen Payne & Pauline Kelly	4	2	1	1	58	57	5
4	(Zimbabwe) Cora Williams & Patricia Landman	4	0	1	3	40	66	1
5	(Malawi) Sheila Khamisa & Trish Morrison	4	0	1	3	29	70	1

Section C

Pos	Player	P	W	D	L	F	A	Pts
1	(South Africa) Ellen Cawker & Jill Hackland	4	3	1	0	73	41	7
2	(Australia) Lee Poletti & Roma Dunn	4	3	1	0	73	46	7
3	(Cook Islands) Mou Tokorangi & Kanny Vaile	4	2	0	2	52	62	4
4	(Malaysia) Bakar Sarimah & Nazura Ngahat	4	1	0	3	56	49	2
5	(Samoa) Taloapatina Tuiletufuga & Manuia Porter	4	0	0	4	34	90	0

Section D

Pos	Player	P	W	D	L	F	A	Pts
1	(Northern Ireland) Donna McNally & Barbara Cameron	4	3	1	0	61	35	7
2	(Wales) Joanna Weale & Anwen Butten	4	3	1	0	71	48	7
3	(Guernsey) Jean Simon & Anne Simon	4	2	0	2	50	62	4
4	(Fiji) Radhika Prasad & Litia Tikoisuva	4	0	1	3	44	62	1
5	(Papua New Guinea) Karina Okuk & Maggie Worri	4	0	1	3	49	68	1

Finals

Quarter-Final
New Zealand	17
Australia	7
Wales	24
Jersey	10
South Africa	21
Scotland	5
England	16
Northern Ireland	7

Semi-Final
New Zealand	20
Wales	11
South Africa	23
England	12

Gold medal
New Zealand	22
South Africa	12

=== Women's fours ===
Section A

Pos	Player	P	W	D	L	F	A	Pts
1	(New Zealand) Patsy Jorgensen, Jan Khan, Anne Lomas, Wendy Jensen	6	4	0	2	96	76	8
2	(Jersey) Gean O'Neil, Lorraine Murphy, Liz Cole, Suzie Dingle	6	4	0	2	64	82	8
3	(Malaysia) Azlina Arshad, Ismail Shima, Haslah Hassan, Bah Chu Mei	6	3	0	3	107	66	6
4	(Northern Ireland) Alicia Weir, Paula Montgomery, Dessa Baird, Pat Horner	6	3	0	3	92	69	6
5	(South Africa) Maria Jansen, Jane Moodaley, Hendrika Lynn, Annette Terry	6	3	0	3	93	80	6
6	(Fiji) Salanieta Taylor, Salanieta Valetu, Doreen Newton, Akanisi Kae Stephens	6	3	0	3	75	78	6
7	(Cook Islands) Daphne Tauraa, Moeroa Dave, Nane Tere, Rebecca Akaruru	6	1	0	5	50	126	2

Section B

Pos	Player	P	W	D	L	F	A	Pts
1	(Wales) Ann Sutherland, Pam John, Nina Shipperlee, Gill Miles	7	5	1	1	131	75	11
2	(England) Ellen Alexander, Shirley Page, Gill Mitchell, Carol Duckworth	7	4	1	2	93	97	9
3	(Canada) Shirley Fitzpatrick-Wong, Andrea Weigand, Melissa Ranger, Anita Nivala	7	3	2	2	121	96	8
4	(Scotland) Sandra Steven, Betty Forsyth, Joyce Dickey, Sarah Gourlay	7	4	0	3	103	81	8
5	(Australia) Arrienne Wynen, Gordana Baric, Jenny Harragon, Jan Palazzi	7	3	1	3	103	97	7
6	(Papua New Guinea) Agnes Dean, Maria Piwen Pomaleu, Elizabeth Bure, Linda Ahmat	7	3	0	4	102	92	6
7	(Brunei) Pg Siti Pg Bakar, Isah Muntol, Amp Lilimaryani Amp Hj Salleh, HjhAjijah Muntol	7	2	0	5	63	126	4
8	(Norfolk Island) Karen Kemp, Bev Wheeler, Carole Yager, Joyce Dyer	7	1	1	5	82	134	3

Finals

Quarter-Final
England	20
Malaysia	10
Scotland	13
New Zealand	18
Jersey	10
Canada	11
Wales	16
Northern Ireland	8

Semi-Final
England	19
New Zealand	6
Canada	13
Wales	12

Gold medal
England	17
Canada	6

== See also ==
- List of Commonwealth Games medallists in lawn bowls
- Lawn bowls at the Commonwealth Games
