= 2004 World Outdoor Bowls Championship – Women's pairs =

Lawn bowls event

World Outdoor Championship 2004 women's pairs
- 10th World Outdoor Bowls Championships
- Location: Leamington Spa, England
- Date(s): 3–17 September 2004
- Category: World Bowls Championship

The 2004 World Outdoor Bowls Championship women's pairs was held at Victoria Park, Leamington Spa in England.

Originally the championships were going to take place in Kuala Lumpur, Malaysia during 2003 but due to political reasons it was moved to England the following year.

Jo Edwards and Sharon Sims of New Zealand won the pairs gold medal.

== Section tables ==
First round 4 sections, top two teams qualify for quarter finals.

=== Section A ===
Pos	Player	P	W	D	L	Pts	Shots
1	(Scotland) Margaret Letham & Joyce Lindores	7	5	2	0	12	+63
2	(New Zealand) Jo Edwards & Sharon Sims	7	5	1	1	11	+42
3	(Israel) Tzila Gavish & Ruthie Gilor	7	5	1	1	11	+39
4	(Namibia) Mary Nasilowski & Elaine Krahenbuhl	7	4	0	3	8	−2
5	(Malaysia) Azlina Arshad & Nor Hashimah Ismail	7	3	0	4	6	+26
6	(Portugal) Rhona Robertson & Janeth Gomez de Rocha	7	3	0	4	6	−17
7	(Japan) Hiroko Mori & Yoko Goda	7	1	0	6	2	−67
8	(Spain) Pat Young & Patsy Fisher	7	0	0	7	0	−84

=== Section B ===
Pos	Player	P	W	D	L	Pts	Shots
1	(Guernsey) Eunice Trebert & Anne Simon	6	5	0	1	10	+49
2	(Australia) Karen Murphy & Maria Rigby	6	4	0	2	8	+55
3	(Fiji) Sainiana Walker & Litia Tikoisuva	6	4	0	2	8	+11
4	(South Africa) Leone du Rand & Lorna Trigwell	6	3	0	3	6	+5
5	(Thailand) Rosarina Sommani & Songsin Tsao	6	3	0	3	6	−22
6	(Zimbabwe) Jane Rigby & Linda Farrell	6	2	0	4	4	−12
7	(India) Shashi Chhabra & Renu Mohte	6	0	0	6	0	−86

=== Section C ===
Pos	Player	P	W	D	L	Pts	Shots
1	(England) Ellen Alexander & Amy Monkhouse	6	5	0	1	10	+51
2	(Canada) Clarice Fitzpatrick & Shirley Fitzpatrick-Wong	6	4	0	2	8	+19
3	(Jersey) Gean O'Neil & Karina Bisson	6	4	0	2	8	+8
4	Phyllis Brett & Margaret Johnston	6	3	1	2	7	+3
5	(Eswatini) Dawn Squires & Jacqueline Reeve	6	2	0	4	6	−6
6	(Netherlands) Leny Peek & Guurtje Ros-Copier	6	2	0	4	4	−28
7	(Isle of Man) Maureen Payne & Val Robins	6	0	1	5	1	−47

=== Section D ===
Pos	Player	P	W	D	L	Pts	Shots
1	(Zambia) Margaret Mponda & Eddah Mpezeni	6	5	1	0	11	+59
2	(Wales) Betty Morgan & Caroline Taylor	6	5	0	1	10	+24
3	(Botswana) Sheila Spring & Lebo Moroke	6	4	0	2	8	−2
4	(United States) Anne Nunes & Mary Delisle	6	3	0	3	6	+4
5	(Hong Kong) Grace Chu & Dannie Chiu	6	2	0	4	4	−23
6	(Philippines) Milagros Witheridge & Ronalyn Greenlees	6	1	0	5	2	−14
7	(Norfolk Island) Kitha Bailey & Anne Pledger	6	0	1	5	1	−48

== Finals ==
Play Offs
New Zealand	19
Zambia	10
Australia	23
England	15
Wales	20
Guernsey	17
Canada	17
Scotland	13

Semifinals
New Zealand	13
Australia	11
Wales	15
Canada	14

Gold medal
New Zealand	17
Wales	11
Third place
Australia	22
Canada	5

== Results ==
Women's pairs section A
Round 1 – 3 Sep		
Scotland	Portugal	19–11
New Zealand	Japan	23–7
Malaysia	Spain	29–13
Israel	Namibia	18–11
Round 2 – 4 Sep		
Scotland	Namibia	25–11
Israel	Portugal	28–14
New Zealand	Malaysia	28–11
Japan	Spain	16–15
Round 3 – 5 Sep		
Scotland	Malaysia	16–14
Namibia	New Zealand	24–8
Portugal	Spain	22–9
Israel	Japan	20–13
Round 4 – 5 Sep		
Scotland	Spain	25–11
New Zealand	Israel	16–12
Namibia	Japan	20–18
Malaysia	Portugal	35–8
Round 5 – 6 Sep		
Scotland	Israel	14–14
New Zealand	Spain	26–10
Portugal	Namibia	24–7
Malaysia	Japan	21–10
Round 6 – 7 Sep		
Scotland	Japan	33–8
New Zealand	Portugal	18–13
Namibia	Spain	24–9
Israel	Malaysia	18–12
Round 7 – 8 Sep		
Scotland	New Zealand	14–14
Namibia	Malaysia	19–16
Israel	Spain	27–18
Portugal	Japan	16–9

Women's pairs section B
Round 1 – 3 Sep		
Thailand	Fiji	23–10
Australia	India	43–8
Guernsey	Zimbabwe	25–13
Round 2 – 4 Sep		
Guernsey	Australia	23–9
Fiji	South Africa	18–14
Zimbabwe	India	27–10
Round 3 – 5 Sep		
Australia	South Africa	30–11
Guernsey	Fiji	27–16
Thailand	India	17–16
Round 4 – 5 Sep		
Fiji	Australia	17–12
South Africa	Guernsey	16–12
Zimbabwe	Thailand	33–9
Round 5 – 6 Sep		
Australia	Thailand	21–7
Fiji	Zimbabwe	17–10
South Africa	India	17–16
Round 6 – 7 Sep		
Australia	Zimbabwe	15–9
Guernsey	India	21–8
Thailand	South Africa	17–12
Round 7 – 8 Sep		
Fiji	India	21–12
Guernsey	Thailand	19–16
South Africa	Zimbabwe	33–5

Women's pairs section C
Round 1 – 3 Sep		
Jersey	Canada	20–19
(Eswatini) Swaziland	Netherlands	17–8
England	Isle of Man	28–7
Round 2 – 4 Sep		
England	Jersey	22–11
(Eswatini) Swaziland	Ireland	17–20
Canada	Isle of Man	19–11
Round 3 – 5 Sep		
England	Ireland	22–10
Jersey	(Eswatini) Swaziland	16–11
Netherlands	Isle of Man	20–16
Round 4 – 5 Sep		
England	(Eswatini) Swaziland	18–11
Ireland	Jersey	25–19
Netherlands	Canada	15–13
Round 5 – 6 Sep		
England	Netherlands	18–14
Canada	(Eswatini) Swaziland	20–14
Ireland	Isle of Man	18–18
Round 6 – 7 Sep		
Canada	England	17–13
Jersey	Isle of Man	23–15
Ireland	Netherlands	22–12
Round 7 – 8 Sep		
(Eswatini) Swaziland	Isle of Man	16–10
Jersey	Netherlands	21–10
Canada	Ireland	21–17

Women's pairs section D
Round 1 – 3 Sep		
United States	Philippines	18–15
Botswana	Norfolk Island	18–16
Zambia	Wales	20–13
Round 2 – 4 Sep		
Wales	United States	20–13
Hong Kong	Norfolk Island	29–6
Zambia	Philippines	18–18
Round 3 – 5 Sep		
United States	Hong Kong	32–9
Wales	Norfolk Island	15–14
Botswana	Philippines	14–12
Round 4 – 5 Sep		
United States	Norfolk Island	21–18
Zambia	Botswana	18–15
Wales	Hong Kong	16–12
Round 5 – 6 Sep		
Botswana	United States	17–13
Zambia	Norfolk Island	31–12
Hong Kong	Philippines	19–12
Round 6 – 7 Sep		
Zambia	United States	23–9
Wales	Philippines	19–17
Botswana	Hong Kong	21–11
Round 7 – 8 Sep		
Norfolk Island	Philippines	19–19
Wales	Botswana	28–11
Zambia	Hong Kong	24–8
