= 2000 World Outdoor Bowls Championship – Women's fours =

World bowls event

World Outdoor Championships 2000 – women's fours
- 9th World Outdoor Bowls Championships
- Location: Moama, Australia
- Date: 8–25 March 2000
- Category: World Outdoor Championships

The 2000 World Outdoor Bowls Championship women's fours was held in Moama, Australia, from 8 to 25 March 2000.

The gold medal was won by Jan Khan, Patsy Jorgensen, Sharon Sims and Anne Lomas of New Zealand.

== Section tables ==
=== Section A ===
Pos	Player	P	W	D	L	Pts
1	(Scotland) Julie Forrest, Betty Forsyth, Sarah Gourlay, Joyce Lindores	16				30
2	(Australia) Willow Fong, Margaret Sumner, Roma Dunn, Arrienne Wynen	16				26 (+193)
3	(England) Katherine Hawes, Jill Polley, Mary Price, Norma Shaw	16				26 (+172)
4	Zambia	16				22
5	Donna McNally, Dorothy Kane, Barbara Cameron, Phillis Nolan	16				19 (+109)
6	(Israel) Merle Swerdlow, Renee Kusman, Shirley Kantor, Pnina Gelbgiser	16				19 (+42)
7	Zimbabwe	16				18
8	(Canada) Doreen Creaney, Jean Roney, Maureen Thompson, Anita Nivala	16				17
9	(United States) Kottia Spangler, Dora Stewart, Anne Cherney, Maryna Hyland	16				16
10	(Guernsey) Pauline Leadbetter, Eunice Trebert, Jean Simon, Sheila Cave	16				14
11	Fiji	16				13 (-5)
12	Namibia	16				13 (-29)
13	Botswana	16				10 (-73)
14	(Samoa) Lagi Letoa	16				20 (-84)
15	Argentina	16				9
165	Brazil	16				8
17	(Japan) Yoke Kamoshida	16				2

=== Section B ===
Pos	Player	P	W	D	L	Pts
1	(New Zealand) Jan Khan, Patsy Jorgensen, Sharon Sims, Anne Lomas	16				29
2	(Jersey) Liz Cole, Gean O'Neil, Suzie Dingle, Sheila Syvret	16				28
3	(Malaysia) Nazura Ngahat	16				27
4	South Africa	16				26 (+204)
5	(Wales) Ann Sutherland, Shirley King, Nina Shipperlee, Betty Morgan	16				26 (+176)
6	(Papua New Guinea) Maggie Worri	16				18 (+66)
7	(Hong Kong) Danna Chiu, Angela Chau, Linda Da Luz, Lena Yeung	16				18 (-13)
8	Cook Islands	16				17
9	(Brunei) Suhana Hati Mohd Daud	16				14
10	(Eswatini) Swaziland	16				13 (-14)
11	Norfolk Island	16				13 (-46)
12	(Spain) Mavis Dugdale	16				12
13	(Kenya) Bharti Babia	16				11
14	(Singapore) Josephine Sarbo	16				10
15	Thailand	16				6
16	Netherlands	16				3
17	India	16	0	1	15	1

== Results ==
Women's fours section A
Round 1 - (17 Mar)		
England	Australia	34–18
United States	Ireland	30–20
Guernsey	Namibia	23–14
{{}}	{{}}	–
{{}}	{{}}	–
{{}}	{{}}	–
{{}}	{{}}	–
{{}}	{{}}	–
Round 2 - (17 Mar)		
England	Argentina	31–12
Guernsey	Canada	25–12
Scotland	Samoa	27–17
{{}}	{{}}	–
{{}}	{{}}	–
{{}}	{{}}	–
{{}}	{{}}	–
{{}}	{{}}	–
Round 3 - (18 Mar)		
Ireland	Israel	21–16
Guernsey	England	17–14
Scotland	Namibia	21–20
{{}}	{{}}	–
{{}}	{{}}	–
{{}}	{{}}	–
{{}}	{{}}	–
{{}}	{{}}	–
Round 4 - (18 Mar)		
Ireland	Guernsey	32–14
Scotland	Fiji	26–19
England	Botswana	29–18
{{}}	{{}}	–
{{}}	{{}}	–
{{}}	{{}}	–
{{}}	{{}}	–
{{}}	{{}}	–
Round 5 - (19 Mar)		
Scotland	Japan	37–15
Guernsey	Botswana	32–10
England	Zimbabwe	21–18
Canada	Ireland	18–17
{{}}	{{}}	–
{{}}	{{}}	–
{{}}	{{}}	–
{{}}	{{}}	–
Round 6 - (19 Mar)		
Scotland	Guernsey	22–19
England	United States	29–12
{{}}	{{}}	–
{{}}	{{}}	–
{{}}	{{}}	–
{{}}	{{}}	–
{{}}	{{}}	–
{{}}	{{}}	–
Round 7 - (20 Mar)		
England	Israel	25–12
Samoa	Botswana	26–13
Namibia	Argentina	23–11
Scotland	Brazil	47–5
United States	Guernsey	23–13
Ireland	Japan	48–10
Zambia	Zimbabwe	20–17
Canada	Australia	25–21
Round 8 - (20 Mar)		
United States	Samoa	22–16
Zambia	Guernsey	20–17
Israel	Japan	33–12
England	Brazil	43–6
Canada	Argentina	24–17
Botswana	Fiji	23–16
Scotland	Zimbabwe	18–17
Ireland	Namibia	22–21
Round 9 - (20 Mar)		
Guernsey	Argentina	34–15
Samoa	Brazil	27–19
Scotland	Israel	26–12
Australia	Fiji	27–11
United States	Zambia	28–14
Zimbabwe	Ireland	22–13
England	Canada	26–13
Namibia	Japan	23–18
Round 10 - (21 Mar)		
Scotland	Zambia	25–20
England	Ireland	20–20
Fiji	Canada	25–16
Brazil	United States	20–19
Argentina	Japan	17–16
Australia	Namibia	30–10
Zimbabwe	Samoa	19–17
Israel	Botswana	22–17
Round 11 - (21 Mar)		
Scotland	Canada	28–13
Guernsey	Japan	19–15
Ireland	Brazil	35–11
Zimbabwe	Israel	29–15
Australia	Botswana	33–15
England	Fiji	28–13
Namibia	Samoa	25–14
Argentina	United States	15–15
Round 12 - (22 Mar)		
Zimbabwe	Brazil	23–16
Israel	Zambia	19–17
Canada	Botswana	28–10
England	Namibia	18–18
Australia	Guernsey	22–14
Samoa	Japan	26–16
Fiji	Argentina	21–14
Scotland	Ireland	26–22
Round 13 - (22 Mar)		
Namibia	Canada	22–19
Australia	Argentina	37–7
Japan	Brazil	27–17
Zimbabwe	Guernsey	25–13
Scotland	United States	35–13
Ireland	Fiji	16–13
Botswana	Zambia	20–15
England	Samoa	27–13
Round 14 - (23 Mar)		
Scotland	Australia	17–15
Fiji	Zimbabwe	22–12
Zambia	Argentina	26–7
Israel	Guernsey	27–16
Botswana	Japan	34–9
Ireland	Samoa	39–4
Canada	Brazil	30–21
Namibia	United States	21–19
Round 15 - (23 Mar)		
Zambia	England	23–13
Scotland	Botswana	31–13
Brazil	Guernsey	19–13
Australia	Ireland	25–7
United States	Zimbabwe	22–19
Israel	Fiji	18–18
Argentina	Samoa	22–16
Canada	Japan	29–11
Round 16 - (24 Mar)		
Ireland	Argentina	38–11
Guernsey	Samoa	28–23
England	Scotland	18–15
Australia	Israel	20–18
United States	Botswana	16–15
Zambia	Japan	21–14
Brazil	Fiji	25–22
Zimbabwe	Namibia	18–15
Round 17 - (24 Mar)		
Fiji	Guernsey	26–11
Zambia	Ireland	18–12
England	Japan	35–11
Scotland	Argentina	28–11
Canada	United States	24–24
Botswana	Namibia	25–13
Samoa	Israel	24–20
Australia	Zimbabwe	18–16

Women's fours section B
Round 1 - (17 Mar)		
{{}}	{{}}	–
{{}}	{{}}	–
{{}}	{{}}	–
{{}}	{{}}	–
{{}}	{{}}	–
{{}}	{{}}	–
{{}}	{{}}	–
{{}}	{{}}	–
Round 2 - (17 Mar)		
Wales	Kenya	31–9
{{}}	{{}}	–
{{}}	{{}}	–
{{}}	{{}}	–
{{}}	{{}}	–
{{}}	{{}}	–
{{}}	{{}}	–
{{}}	{{}}	–
Round 3 - (18 Mar)		
Wales	Hong Kong	22–18
Jersey	Norfolk Island	28–13
{{}}	{{}}	–
{{}}	{{}}	–
{{}}	{{}}	–
{{}}	{{}}	–
{{}}	{{}}	–
{{}}	{{}}	–
Round 4 - (18 Mar)		
Wales	Cook Islands	26–13
Jersey	(Eswatini) Swaziland	28–8
{{}}	{{}}	–
{{}}	{{}}	–
{{}}	{{}}	–
{{}}	{{}}	–
{{}}	{{}}	–
{{}}	{{}}	–
Round 5 - (19 Mar)		
Wales	Netherlands	51–9
Cook Islands	India	39–9
Jersey	Malaysia	24–11
{{}}	{{}}	–
{{}}	{{}}	–
{{}}	{{}}	–
{{}}	{{}}	–
{{}}	{{}}	–
Round 6 - (19 Mar)		
Jersey	Hong Kong	22–11
Wales	Singapore	27–12
{{}}	{{}}	–
{{}}	{{}}	–
{{}}	{{}}	–
{{}}	{{}}	–
{{}}	{{}}	–
{{}}	{{}}	–
Round 7 - (20 Mar)		
Norfolk Island	Netherlands	19–9
New Zealand	Jersey	20–18
South Africa	(Eswatini) Swaziland	25–17
Malaysia	Hong Kong	29–10
Papua New Guinea	Kenya	28–12
Singapore	India	22–11
Wales	Brunei	35–12
Spain	Thailand	23–13
Round 8 - (20 Mar)		
Kenya	India	33–13
Singapore	Spain	29–15
Wales	Thailand	32–10
Papua New Guinea	Cook Islands	23–15
Malaysia	(Eswatini) Swaziland	17–15
Jersey	Netherlands	31–15
New Zealand	Brunei	27–20
Hong Kong	Norfolk Island	23–17
Round 9 - (20 Mar)		
New Zealand	(Eswatini) Swaziland	21–21
Malaysia	Singapore	44–8
Spain	India	28–9
South Africa	Cook Islands	23–5
Hong Kong	Netherlands	25–23
Wales	Jersey	24–20
Norfolk Island	Thailand	28–20
Kenya	Brunei	22–19
Round 10 - (21 Mar)		
Jersey	Papua New Guinea	19–17
Wales	Spain	23–15
Malaysia	Netherlands	28–11
South Africa	Hong Kong	33–7
New Zealand	Norfolk Island	35–9
Kenya	Thailand	26–13
Brunei	India	37–3
Cook Islands	(Eswatini) Swaziland	27–13
Round 11 - (21 Mar)		
Wales	(Eswatini) Swaziland	28–16
Kenya	Hong Kong	20–13
Jersey	Thailand	25–19
Singapore	Netherlands	31–12
Norfolk Island	Brunei	27–15
New Zealand	Cook Islands	32–12
South Africa	Papua New Guinea	28–18
Malaysia	India	31–14
Round 12 - (22 Mar)		
Brunei	Thailand	20–17
Wales	Norfolk Island	30–19
New Zealand	Hong Kong	21–19
Netherlands	Kenya	21–18
South Africa	Singapore	32–6
(Eswatini) Swaziland	Papua New Guinea	30–25
Cook Islands	Malaysia	19–19
Jersey	Spain	22–19
Round 13 - (22 Mar)		
Hong Kong	(Eswatini) Swaziland	25–18
Wales	India	28–12
South Africa	Malaysia	19–16
New Zealand	Kenya	32–8
Spain	Papua New Guinea	24–23
Cook Islands	Norfolk Island	17–15
Thailand	Singapore	22–17
Brunei	Netherlands	23–11
Round 14 - (23 Mar)		
Cook Islands	Thailand	27–10
Jersey	Singapore	29–10
Papua New Guinea	Netherlands	26–14
Brunei	(Eswatini) Swaziland	21–15
Wales	South Africa	25–14
Malaysia	Spain	21–18
Norfolk Island	Kenya	17–17
Hong Kong	India	33–12
Round 15 - (23 Mar)		
Papua New Guinea	Wales	23–19
Jersey	Cook Islands	17–16
(Eswatini) Swaziland	Netherlands	17–13
Thailand	India	19–17
Malaysia	Kenya	15–12
Brunei	Singapore	22–15
New Zealand	Spain	36–9
South Africa	Norfolk Island	29–6
Round 16 - (24 Mar)		
New Zealand	Wales	31–14
Jersey	South Africa	21–18
Malaysia	Norfolk Island	27–12
Hong Kong	Thailand	19–16
Spain	Netherlands	26–8
Cook Islands	Brunei	17–14
Papua New Guinea	India	50–7
Singapore	Kenya	21–19
Round 17 - (24 Mar)		
Jersey	Kenya	29–15
Malaysia	Wales	22–18
New Zealand	Netherlands	34–5
Norfolk Island	Spain	24–15
Cook Islands	Singapore	28–16
South Africa	Thailand	25–11
(Eswatini) Swaziland	India	29–14
Papua New Guinea	Hong Kong	27–19

=== Bronze medal match ===
Australia bt Jersey 33–10

=== Gold medal match ===
New Zealand bt Scotland 18–17
