= Bowls England National Championships (women's singles four wood) =

British lawn bowls event

The women's singles four wood is one of the events at the annual Bowls England National Championships.

The four-wood singles is the traditional variation of the game; see Glossary of bowls terms.

== Venues ==
- 1932–1933 (Blackheath & Greenwich Club)
- 1934–1934 (Balham Constitutional Bowls Club)
- 1935–1936 (Pitshanger Park, Ealing)
- 1937–1974 (Wimbledon Park)
- 1975–present (Victoria Park, Royal Leamington Spa)

== Sponsors ==
- 1981–1985 (Lombard)
- 1986–1993 (Liverpool Victoria)
- 1994–1996 (Double Century Sherry)
- 2000, 2002–2004 (National Express)
- 2001–2001 (Steradent)
- 2023–2025 (Aviva)

== Past winners ==
Year	Champion	Club	County	Runner-up	Club	County	Ref
1932	Ethel Tigg	Waddon Residents	Surrey	Mrs Hope	Maidenhead	Berkshire	
1933	Louisa King	Waddon Residents	Surrey	Mrs Harris	Torquay	Devon	
1934	Mrs S. Holman	Waddon Residents	Surrey	Mrs Harris	Blackheath	Kent	
1935	Mrs McDanall	Torbay Country	Devon	Mrs Harris	Blackheath	Kent	
1936	Lily Parnell	Clarence Park	Somerset	Josephine Culling	New Town, Colchester	Essex	
1937	Mrs Batsford	Temple Fortune	Middlesex	Mrs E. Sayer	Oxted	Surrey	
1938	Josephine Culling	New Town, Colchester	Essex	Mrs C L Veasey	Dulwich	Surrey	
1939	Violet Howard	Newton Abbot	Devon	Mrs Worth	Victoria	Leicestershire	
1940–1944 No competition due to war
1946	Maud Chillman	Hampden Park	Sussex	Miss Crawford	Bournemouth	Hampshire	
1947	Clara Johns	Hastings & St. Leonards	Sussex	Mrs B. Simister	Southgate	Middlesex	
1948	Violet Woodhead (née Howard)	Paignton	Devon	Mrs D Harding	Old Town, Eastbourne	Sussex	
1949	Maud Chillman	Hampden Park	Sussex	Mrs Oliver	New Lampton	Durham	
1950	Ena Buckland	South Norwood	Surrey	Mrs L. E. Harris	Durham City	Durham	
1951	Bessie Burden	Ashford	Kent	May Colquhoun	Lammas	Middlesex	
1952	Marjorie Colley	Torbay Country	Devon	Evelyn Courtenay	Victoria Park, Bridgwater	Somerset	
1953	Ivy May Lavender	Hastings & St. Leonards	Sussex	Edith May Hook	Stroud	Gloucestershire	
1954	Dorothy Franklin	Sheen	Surrey	Gladys Hillier	Bogonor Regis	Sussex	
1955	Annie Beath	Zetland Park, Redcar	Yorkshire	Mrs D. C. Coleman	Sheen	Surrey	
1956	Nancie Whalley	Frome Selwood	Somerset	May Colquhoun	Lammas	Middlesex	
1957	Florrie Wilson	Hastings & St. Leonards	Sussex	Clara McNaughton	Whitley & Monkseaton	Northumberland	
1958	Nancie Whalley	Frome Selwood	Somerset	Mavis Steele	Watling Association	Middlesex	
1959	Joyce Lucking	Royal Household	Berkshire	Annie Beath	Zetland Park, Redcar	Yorkshire	
1960	Louisa Coxall	Milton Regis	Kent	Helen Jolliffe	Harrogate	Yorkshire	
1961	Mavis Steele	Watling Association	Middlesex	Edith Ferry	Stratton Church Ways	Wiltshire	
1962	Mavis Steele	Watling Association	Middlesex	Minnie Powell	Tally Ho!	Warwickshire	
1963	Frances Carvell	Gunnersbury	Middlesex	Mary Linfield	Maltravers	Sussex	
1964	Daisy Dowling	West Streatham	Surrey	Joyce Lucking	Royal Household	Berkshire	
1965	Janet Auld	Silksworth	Durham	Eleanor Routledge	Silloth	Cumberland	
1966	Dora Hills	Morpeth	Northumberland	Ena Buckland	South Norwood	Surrey	
1967	Dorothy Payne	Greenhill	Dorset	Eva Harris	Rugby Town	Warwickshire	
1968	Lilian Bufton	Tally Ho!	Warwickshire	Dorothy Tayler	Newquay	Cornwall	
1969	Mavis Steele	Watling Association	Middlesex	Mollie Ward	Sparrows Nest	Suffolk	
1970	Nancie Colling (née Whalley)	Frome Selwood	Somerset	Mavis Steele	Watling Association	Middlesex	
1971	Christine Frost	Phear Park	Devon	Daphne Leese	Hornsey	Middlesex	
1972	Mollie Ward	Sparrows Nest	Suffolk	Mrs A Russell	Luton Co-op	Bedfordshire	
1973	Eileen King	Poole Park	Dorset	Anne Shipton	Broadstone	Dorset	
1974	Vera Peck	Borough of Eye	Suffolk	Joan Sparkes	Central Park	Essex	
1975	Ivy Lawson	Spennymoor	Durham	Margo Attwood	Street	Somerset	
1976	Jeannie Croot	Canford	Gloucestershire	Pamela Allison	Oxford City & County	Oxfordshire	
1977	Betty Stubbings	Pickering	Yorkshire	Norma Shaw	Ropner Park	Durham	
1978	Eileen Logan	Bounds Green	Middlesex	Brenda Atherton	Plessey	Nottinghamshire	
1979	Lorraine Hawes	Bracknell	Berkshire	Margaret Fawkes	Bogonor Regis	Sussex	
1980	Phyllis Derrick	Magdalen Park	Surrey	Joan Haynes	Peterborough	Huntingdonshire	
1981	Margaret Madden	Wilton Recar	Yorkshire	Christine Rumball	Watford	Hertfordshire	
1982	Wendy Clarke	Southampton	Hampshire	Phoebe Spence	Middlesbrough	Yorkshire	
1983	Jean Valls	Raynes Park	Surrey	Mary Price	Burnham	Buckinghamshire	
1984	Olive Henery	Swindon	Wiltshire	Madeline Gooding	Exmouth Madeira	Devon	
1985	Ena Clarke	Countesthorpe	Leicestershire	Wendy Line	Southampton	Hampshire	
1986	Betty Maisey	Barking	Essex	Jayne Roylance	North Walsham	Norfolk	
1987	Norma May	Camborne	Cornwall	Mary Price	Burnham	Buckinghamshire	
1988	Mary Price	Burnham	Buckinghamshire	Wendy Barnard	Brixham	Devon	
1989	Jean Baker	Alfreton	Derbyshire	Wendy Line	Southampton	Hampshire	
1990	Barbara Till	Milton Park	Hampshire	Joan Howlett	West Bridgford	Nottinghamshire	
1991	Jean Evans	Perkins	Huntingdonshire	Edna Bessell	Yeovil	Somerset	
1992	Wendy Line	Southampton	Hampshire	Liz Shorter	County Arts	Norfolk	
1993	Dorothy Prior	Hewell Redditch	Worcestershire	Carole Lloyd	Milton Park	Hampshire	
1994	Ingrid Betke	Thaxted	Essex	Pat Kirk	Wealdstone	Middlesex	
1995	Janet Newman	St Austell	Cornwall	Vi Wade	Kingsthorpe	Northamptonshire	
1996	Mary Price	Burnham	Buckinghamshire	Katherine Hawes	Oxford City	Oxfordshire	
1997	Mary Price	Burnham	Buckinghamshire	Jean Baker	Blackwell	Derbyshire	
1998	Norma Shaw	Norton-on-Tees	Durham	Gill Mitchell	Kettering Lodge	Northamptonshire	
1999	Joyce Hadfield	Newquay	Cornwall	Jayne Smith	Henlow Park	Bedfordshire	
2000	Ann Anderson	Woodland Darlington	County Durham	Janet Green	West Moors	Dorset	
2001	Sue Harriott	Exmouth Madeira	Devon	Pat Kirk	Wealdstone	Middx	
2002	Helen Wall	South Derbyshire	Derbyshire	Jayne Christie	Henlow Park	Bedfordshire	
2003	Shirley Page	Baldock	Hertfordshire	Wendy King	Milton Regis	Kent	
2004	Amy Monkhouse	Waltham Park	Lincolnshire	Norma Beales	Burnham	Buckinghamshire	
2005	Julie Saunders	Richmond Park	Hampshire	Sue Davies	Broadway	Worcestershire	
2006	Barbara Adams	Market Bosworth	Leicestershire	Barbara Bellamy	Newton Abbot	Devon	
2007	Edna Bessell	Yeovil	Somerset	Ellen Falkner	City of Ely	Cambridgeshire	
2008	Edna Bessell	Yeovil	Somerset	Margaret Watts	Desborough	Northamptonshire	
2009	Jayne Croxall	Mansfield	Nottinghamshire	Sally Butcher	Borough of Eve	Suffolk	
2010	Natalie Melmore	Kings	Devon	Jackie Gibson	Thetford Staniforth	Norfolk	
2011	Ellen Falkner	St. Neots	Cambridgeshire	Amy Gowshall	Cleethorpes	Lincolnshire	
2012	Amy Truran	Homefield Park	Sussex	Amy Gowshall	Cleethorpes	Lincolnshire	
2013	Amy Truran	Homefield Park	Sussex	Sue Davies	Broadway	Worcestershire	
2014	Natalie Melmore	Kings	Devon	Sue Evans	Honiton	Devon	
2015	Sophie Tolchard	Kings	Devon	Gemma Barnett	Cheam	Surrey	
2016	Donna Knight	Oxford City	Oxfordshire	Rachel Mackriell	Eastbourne	Sussex	
2017	Kirsty Richards	Kings Heath	Warks	Natalie Chestney	Kings	Devon	
2018	Sophie Tolchard	Kings	Devon	Amy Gowshall	Cleethorpes	Lincs	
2019	Jamie-Lea Winch	Kingscroft	Leics	Teresa Parnell	Stockton	Durham	
No competition due to COVID-19 pandemic							
2021	Stef Branfield	Clevedon	Somerset	Chris Mitchell	Purton	Wiltshire	
2022	Rebecca Moorbey	Parkway	Hunts	Elaine Score	Springhouse	Essex	
2023	Stef Branfield	Clevedon	Somerset	Jayne Christie	Potton	Bedfordshire	
2024	Izzie White	Chester Road	Worcs	Anne Bernard	Ryde Marina	IOW	
2025	Stef Branfield	Clevedon	Som	Sophie Tolchard	Kings	Devon	
2026	Maddie Burgess	Kingscroft	Leics	Vicky Cook	Workington	Cumbria	
