= Ellen Cawker =

Personal information
- Nationality: South African
- Born: 28 February 1946 (age 80) Perth, Scotland
Medal record
Women's lawn bowls
Commonwealth Games
Silver medal – second place	2002 Manchester	pairs
Atlantic Bowls Championships
Gold medal – first place	1999 Cape Town	fours

Ellen Cawker is a former South African international lawn bowler and national team manager.

== Bowls career ==
Cawker was born in 1946 in Perth, Scotland but emigrated to Rhodesia in 1956.

In 1999 she won the fours gold medal at the Atlantic Bowls Championships with Trish Steyn, Hester Bekker and Lorna Trigwell.

Three years later in 2002, she won the silver medal in the women's pairs with Jill Hackland at the 2002 Commonwealth Games in Manchester.

At international level (as both player and manager), she has won multiple medals - including Commonwealth Games, World Bowls Championships, African States Championships, Atlantic Rim Championships.

She retired from international competition after the Commonwealth Games and then served as South Africa team manager until 2007 but still plays for the Widenham Retirement Village Bowls Club.

In her domestic career at national level, she has won the National Singles, National Mixed Pairs, National Fours, Senior Inter-Districts, Senior Masters.

She won the 2010 fours at the National Championships bowling for the Margate Bowls Club.
