= Carol Duckworth =

English bowls player

Personal information
- Nationality: British (English)
- Born: 15 August 1940 (age 85)

Sport
- Club: Braintree BC
Medal record
Representing England
Commonwealth Games
Gold medal – first place	2002 Manchester	fours
British Isles Championships
Gold medal – first place	1998	pairs

Carol Duckworth is an English international lawn and indoor bowler.

== Bowls career ==
Duckworth played international bowls for Zambia before switching allegiance to England. In 2002, she was part of the gold medal winning team in the fours at the 2002 Commonwealth Games in Manchester along with Ellen Alexander, Shirley Page and Gill Mitchell.

Duckworth has also won the national championship pairs representing Braintree Bowling Club and Essex in 1997 and became the British champion after winning the 1998 pairs at the British Isles Bowls Championships.
