= Harragon =

Harragon is a surname. Notable people with the surname include:

- Jenny Harragon (born 1952), Australian international lawn bowler
- Paul Harragon (born 1968), Australian rugby league footballer
