= Douw Calitz =

South African-born Namibian lawn bowls player

Personal information
- Nationality: Namibian
- Born: 30 December 1974 (age 51) Pietermaritzburg, South Africa

Sport
- Sport: Lawn bowls
- Club: TransNamib BC
Medal record
Representing Namibia
World Singles Champion of Champions
| Gold medal – first place | 2003 Moama, Australia | Men's Singles |

Douw Calitz (born 30 December 1974) is a South African born international lawn bowls player from Namibia who was the 2003 World Singles Champion of Champions.

== Bowls career ==
=== World Championships ===
Calitz has competed for Namibia at five World Bowls Championships in 1996 and 2004, 2008, 2012 and 2016.

=== Commonwealth Games ===
Calitz has represented Namibia at six Commonwealth Games in 1994, 1998, 2002, 2006, 2014 and 2018. This constitutes a record number of appearances for Namibia at the Commonwealth Games.

=== Other events ===
In 2003 he became the World Singles Champion of Champions defeating Darren Burnett of Scotland in the final.
