= Duanne Abrahams =

South African lawn and indoor bowler

Personal information
- Nationality: South Africa
- Born: 19 December 1962 (age 63)

Sport
- Sport: lawn bowls
- Club: Bedfordview; Wanderers BC
Medal record
Representing South Africa
Lawn bowls
Commonwealth Games
Silver medal – second place	2002 Manchester	fours

Duanne Abrahams (born 1962) is a South African international lawn and indoor bowler.

== Bowls career ==
He won a silver medal in the fours with Theuns Fraser, Kevin Campbell and Neil Burkett at the 2002 Commonwealth Games in Manchester.

He continues to bowl at the highest level for the Wanderers Bowling Club.

He won the 2014 fours at the National Championships bowling for the Bedfordview Bowls Club.
