= Superior Air Charter =

Private jet charter company

Superior Air Charter (previously JetSuite)
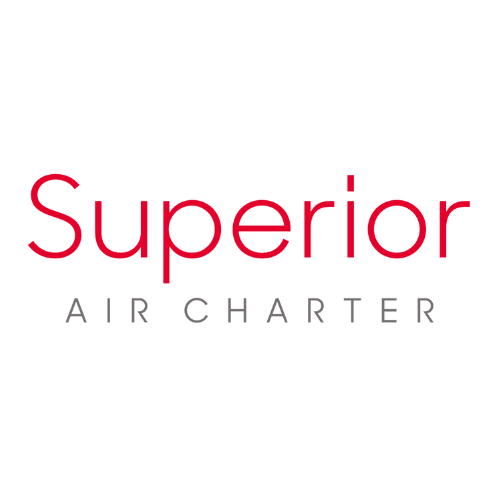
IATA	ICAO	Call sign
—	RSP	REDSTRIPE
- Founded: 2006
- AOC #: 9SUA667M
- Focus cities: Dallas, Texas
- Fleet size: 3
- Parent company: JetSuiteX, Inc.
- Headquarters: Dallas, Texas, U.S.
- Key people: Alex Wilcox, Founder and CEO
- Website: www.superior.flights

Superior Air Charter (previously JetSuite) is a private jet charter company based in Dallas, Texas. The company was founded in 2006 by Alex Wilcox. In 2008, the company was re-branded from Magnum Jet after a push from financial backers. Wilcox is CEO of the company.

On April 17, 2020, JetSuite, as it was called then, halted operations and furloughed most of its crew members due to the COVID-19 pandemic. On April 28, 2020, JetSuite's parent company filed for Chapter 11 bankruptcy. JetSuite has safely operated over 111,000 flights since 2009. In September 2020, the company closed the Chapter 11 filing and retired the name JetSuite. Flying recommenced in November 2020 as Superior Air Charter, operating 3 Phenom 100 aircraft.

== History ==
JetSuite was born out of a re-branding of Magnum Jet after the company's financial backers decided to restructure the company. As part of this restructuring, the company also steered away from advertising as an “air taxi” with shared rides and began focusing solely on private charter flights.

Alex Wilcox, a JetBlue founding executive, is the company's CEO. Wilcox has over two decades of airline industry experience and has been named a Henry Crown Fellow by the Aspen Institute. In addition to receiving funding by private investors in 2010, Zappos CEO Tony Hsieh invested $7 million into JetSuite in 2011.

Early on, the company was recognized for streamlining its business through the use of four-passenger Embraer Phenom 100s as its primary aircraft. This simplifies maintenance and piloting. Moreover, these planes are fuel efficient because they consume 90 gallons of gas in an hour versus more than 230 gallons per hour on some other private jets.

In 2013, JetSuite installed Aircell WiFi for its Phenom fleet.

In 2018, Qatar Airways became a minority stakeholder in JetSuite. In 2018, the company appointed Stephanie Chung as its new president, making her the first African American to lead a major private aviation company.

On April 15, 2020, the company announced it was grounding the entire JetSuite fleet due to the COVID-19 pandemic. On April 28, 2020, JetSuite's parent company Superior Air Charter LLC filed for Chapter 11 bankruptcy, with Wilcox attributing the company's collapse to a 90% decrease in business caused by widespread stay-at-home orders.

In November 2020, JetSuite recommenced operations as Superior Air Charter.

== Services ==
JetSuite offered charter flights on its fleet of Embraer Phenom 100s, Phenom 300s and a Legacy 650. Amenities included WiFi-enabled private flights throughout the United States, Mexico, and Canada. Unlike many of its counterparts, JetSuite did not require membership nor ownership fees, and offered guaranteed online pricing. JetSuite offered an optional "SuiteKey" membership program in which customers would make non-refundable deposits of $100,000 to $500,000 and redeem them for flights at predetermined hourly rates within 24 months.

The company earned the ARG/US Platinum safety rating - the highest-level safety audit rating in private aviation – in 2010 and has maintained it for its flight safety standards. During 2011, the company's jets flew over 10,000 times.

In 2016 it established a charter company, JetSuiteX, which was later renamed JSX.

== Fleet ==
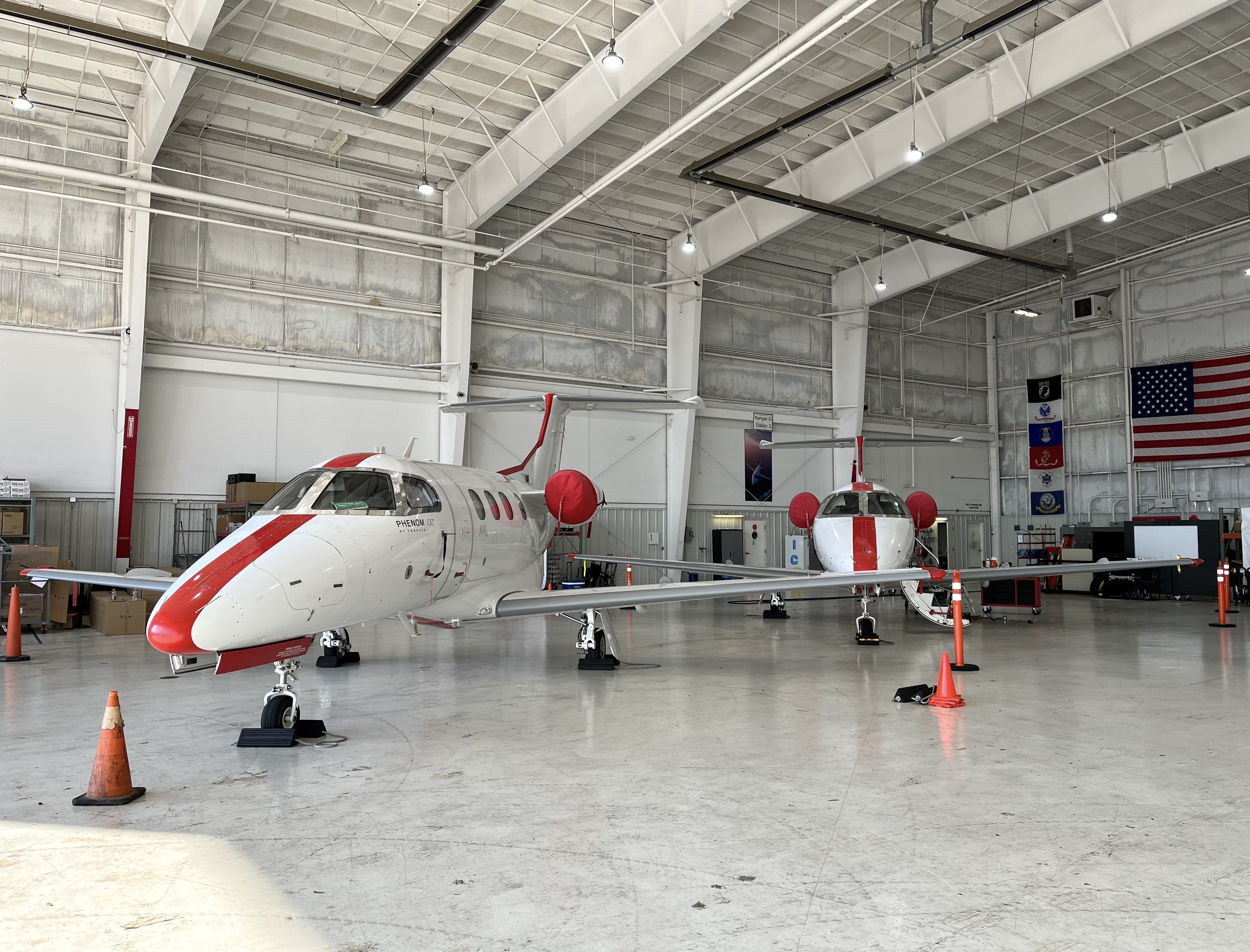
Superior Air Charter Phenom 100s

As of March 2021, the Superior Air Charter fleet consisted of:

Superior Air Charter fleet
Aircraft	In service	Orders	Passengers	Notes
Embraer Phenom 100	3	—	4	operated by Superior Air Charter
Total	3	—		

== Awards ==
- INC Hire Power Award
- 2012, 2013 and 2014 Federal Aviation Administration's Diamond Award of Excellence for Aviation Maintenance Technician
- 2012 and 2013 ARG/US Platinum Safety Rating
- 2014 International Standard for Business Aircraft Operations (IS-BAO) registered
