= Sean Johnson (bowls) =

New Zealand lawn bowler (born 1972)

Personal information
- Nationality: New Zealander
- Born: 10 September 1972 (age 53) Dannevirke

Sport
- Sport: Bowls
- Club: Aramoho BC
Medal record
Representing New Zealand
World Outdoor Championships
Silver medal – second place	2004 Ayr	Men's triples
Silver medal – second place	2004 Ayr	Men's team
Asia Pacific Bowls Championships
Silver medal – second place	2001 Melbourne	singles
Bronze medal – third place	2001 Melbourne	triples
Gold medal – first place	2003 Brisbane	triples
Silver medal – second place	2003 Brisbane	fours

Sean Johnson (born 10 September 1972) is a New Zealand international lawn bowler.

== Bowls career ==
Johnson played 99 times for his country and represented New Zealand in the 2002 Commonwealth Games in the lawn bowls competition.

In 2004 he was part of the triples team with Rowan Brassey and Gary Lawson that won a silver medal at the 2004 World Outdoor Bowls Championship. He just missed out on a second medal in the fours after losing to England 18–17 in the bronze medal play off.

He won four medals at the Asia Pacific Bowls Championshipsincluding a gold medal, in the 2003 triples, in Brisbane.

He won the 2000 pairs title at the New Zealand National Bowls Championships when bowling for the Aramoho Bowls Club.

== Awards ==
In 2013 he was inducted into the Wanganui Sports Hall of Fame in 2013.
