= Gill Mitchell =

British lawn bowler (born 1949)

Gill Mitchell formerly Gill Fitzgerald
Personal information
- Nationality: British (English)
- Born: 23 May 1949 (age 77)

Sport
- Club: Kettering Lodge BC
Medal record
Representing England
World Outdoor Championships
Bronze medal – third place	1996 Leamington Spa	fours
Silver medal – second place	1996 Leamington Spa	team
Commonwealth Games
Gold medal – first place	2002 Manchester	fours
Atlantic Bowls Championships
Silver medal – second place	1995 Durban	pairs
Bronze medal – third place	1995 Durban	fours

Gill Mitchell also known as Gill Fitzgerald (maiden name Gill McBryde) is an English international lawn and indoor bowler.

== Bowls career ==
Under her previous name of Fitzgerald she was part of the fours team that win a bronze medal at the 1996 World Outdoor Bowls Championship in Leamington Spa. In 2002, she was part of the gold medal winning team in the fours at the 2002 Commonwealth Games in Manchester along with Ellen Alexander, Shirley Page and Carol Duckworth.

Mitchell was also two wood singles national champion in 1990 and runner up to Norma Shaw in the 1998 national championships representing Northamptonshire.

In 1995 she won the pairs silver medal (partnering Norma Shaw) and the fours bronze medal at the Atlantic Bowls Championships.
