= Melissa Ranger =

Canadian international lawn bowler (born 1981)

Personal information
- Nationality: Canada
- Born: May 16, 1981
- Died: July 22, 2018 (aged 37)
Medal record
Representing Canada
Lawn bowls
Commonwealth Games
Silver medal – second place	2002 Manchester	fours

Melissa Ranger (born 1981) was a Canadian international lawn bowler.

She won a silver medal in the fours with Shirley Fitzpatrick-Wong, Andrea Weigand and Anita Nivala at the 1998 Commonwealth Games in Kuala Lumpur.

She bowls for Alberta and is a twice Canadian national champion.
