= Eileen Logan =

English international lawn bowler

Personal information
- Nationality: British (English)
- Born: 15 February 1930 Hackney, Greater London
- Died: 24 July 2015 (aged 85) Southgate, London

Sport
- Sport: Lawn bowls
- Club: Bounds Green BC
Medal record
Representing England
British Isles Championships
| Gold medal – first place | 1979 | singles |

Eileen Margaret Logan (née Eileen Fadden; 15 February 1930 – 24 July 2015) was an English international lawn bowler.

== Bowls career ==
Logan became the British singles champion after winning the British Isles Bowls Championships in 1979, when bowling for England and the Bounds Green Bowls Club. She qualified for the event by virtue of winning the English singles crown the previous year.

In 1980, she took part in the world championship qualifier at the Whitnash Bowls Club for the 1981 World Outdoor Bowls Championship in Canada.
