= Joanna Weale =

Welsh lawn bowler

Personal information
- Nationality: British (Welsh)
- Born: 29 July 1975 (age 50)

Sport
- Club: Presteigne BC
Medal record
Representing Wales
Lawn bowls
Commonwealth Games
Bronze medal – third place	2002 Manchester	pairs

Joanna Weale (born 29 July 1975) is a Welsh international lawn and indoor bowler.

== Bowls career ==
Weale won a bronze medal in the pairs with Anwen Butten at the 2002 Commonwealth Games in Manchester.

She bowls for the Llandrindod Wells Bowling Club and is part of a famous Welsh bowling family. She is married to former Welsh national champion Brian Weale and is the sister-in-law to former national champions David, Stuart and Robert (a former World champion).
