= Shirley Page =

English bowler (born 1940)

Personal information
- Nationality: British (English)
- Born: 11 December 1940 (age 85)

Sport
- Club: Baldock Town BC (outdoor) / Riverain BC (Indoor)
Medal record
Representing England
World Outdoor Championships
Gold medal – first place	2004 Leamington Spa	Women's team
Commonwealth Games
Bronze medal – third place	1998 Kuala Lumpur	fours
Gold medal – first place	2002 Manchester	fours
Atlantic Bowls Championships
Silver medal – second place	1993 Florida	triples
Bronze medal – third place	1993 Florida	fours
British Isles Championships
Gold medal – first place	2001	fours

Shirley Page is an English international lawn and indoor bowler.

== Bowls career ==
In 1993, she won the triples silver medal and fours bronze medal at the inaugural Atlantic Bowls Championships.

In 1998 she represented England at the 1998 Commonwealth Games at the 1998 Commonwealth Games in Kuala Lumpur and won a bronze medal.

Four years later she was part of the gold medal winning team in the fours at the 2002 Commonwealth Games in Manchester along with Ellen Alexander, Gill Mitchell and Carol Duckworth.

Page is also a four times national champion representing Hertfordshire, winning the triples in 1990, fours in 2000, the singles in 2003 and the two wood singles in 2004.
