= Sally Paul =

Guernsey lawn bowler

Personal information
- Nationality: British (Guernsey)
- Born: 2 January 1937 (age 89)
- Died: 15 June 2026 Guernsey
Medal record
Representing Guernsey
Atlantic Bowls Championships
Bronze medal – third place	1993 Florida	triples

Sally Paul (born 1937) is a former Guernsey international lawn bowler.

== Bowls career ==
Paul has represented Guernsey at the Commonwealth Games, in the fours at the 1994 Commonwealth Games.

In 1993, she won the triples bronze medal (with Eunice Thompson and Jean Simon) at the Atlantic Bowls Championships in Florida.
