= Eunice Thompson =

Personal information
- Nationality: British (Guernsey)
Medal record
Representing Guernsey
Atlantic Bowls Championships
Bronze medal – third place	1993 Florida	triples

Eunice Thompson is a former Guernsey international lawn bowler.

== Bowls career ==
Thompson has represented Guernsey at the Commonwealth Games, in the fours at the 1994 Commonwealth Games.

In 1993, she won the triples bronze medal with (Jean Simon and Sally Paul) at the Atlantic Bowls Championships in Florida.
