= Dean Morgan (bowls) =

English lawn and indoor bowler

Personal information
- Nationality: England
- Born: 3 March 1970 (age 56)

Sport
- Club: Boscombe Cliff BC
Medal record
Representing England
Lawn bowls
Commonwealth Games
Silver medal – second place	2002 Manchester	pairs

Dean Morgan (born 1970) is an English international lawn and indoor bowler.

He was selected as part of the 2002 Commonwealth Games team and won a silver medal in the pairs with Stephen Farish at the Games in Manchester.

He started bowling aged 14 and joined the successful Boscombe Cliff Bowling Club in 1985 before earning his international indoor debut in 1993 and outdoor debut in 1998.
