= Norma May =

English bowls player

Personal information
- Nationality: British (English)

Sport
- Sport: Lawn bowls
- Club: Camborne BC

Norma May is a former female English international lawn bowler.

== Bowls career ==
May was the English champion after winning the English National Championship in 1987 when she defeated Mary Price in the final of the singles.

May represented England in the fours event, at the 1990 Commonwealth Games in Auckland, New Zealand.
