= Andrea Weigand =

Canadian international lawn bowler (born 1977)

Personal information
- Nationality: Canada
- Born: 19 April 1977 (age 49)
Medal record
Representing Canada
Lawn bowls
Commonwealth Games
Silver medal – second place	2002 Manchester	fours

Andrea Weigand (born 1977) is a Canadian international lawn bowler.

She won a silver medal in the fours with Shirley Fitzpatrick-Wong, Melissa Ranger and Anita Nivala at the 1998 Commonwealth Games in Kuala Lumpur.

Weigand is also a former Canadian National fours champion.
