= Shirley Fitzpatrick-Wong =

Canadian lawn bowler

Personal information
- Nationality: Canadian
- Born: 19 December 1971 (age 54) Winnipeg, Manitoba

Sport
- Club: Sargent Park BC
Medal record
Representing Canada
Lawn bowls
Commonwealth Games
Silver medal – second place	2002 Manchester	fours
Atlantic Bowls Championships
Silver medal – second place	2007 Ayr	pairs
Bronze medal – third place	2007 Ayr	fours

Shirley Fitzpatrick-Wong (born December 19, 1971) is a Canadian international lawn bowler.

== Bowls career ==
She won a silver medal in the fours with Andrea Weigand, Melissa Ranger and Anita Nivala at the 2002 Commonwealth Games.

Two years later she won a bronze medal at the 2004 World Outdoor Bowls Championship - Women's Pairs with her mother Clarice Fitzpatrick. She plays for the Sargent Park Bowling Club.

In 2007 she won the pairs silver medal and fours bronze medal at the Atlantic Bowls Championships.
