= Stephanie Chung =

American business executive

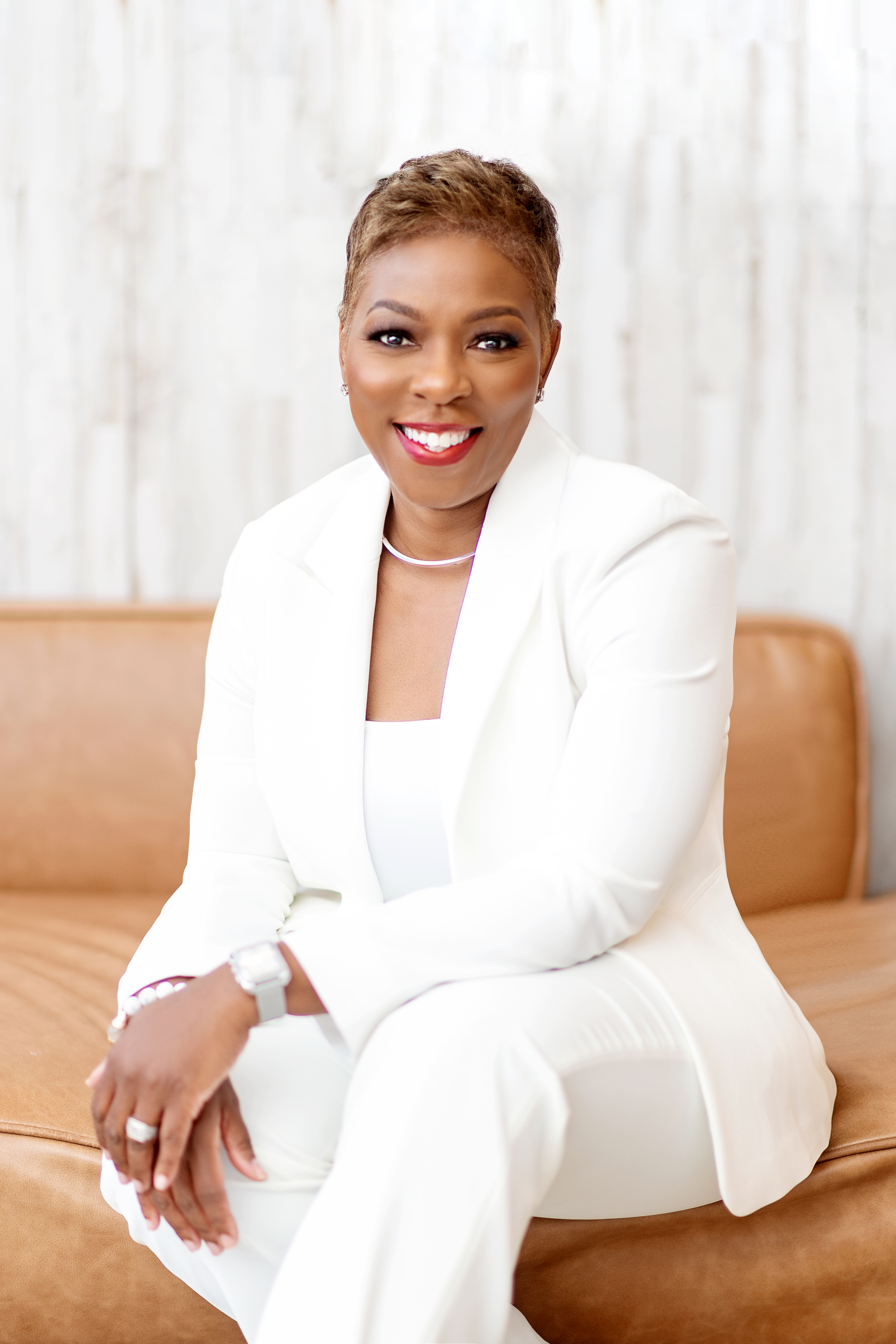
- Chung in 2020
- Occupation: Business executive
- Known for: First African American private aviation president
- Children: 1
- Website: www.stephaniechung.com

Stephanie Chung is an American business executive who was the first African American to serve as president of a private aviation company in the United States. She was president of JetSuite from August 2018 to April 2020. In August 2020, Chung became the inaugural chief growth officer of Wheels Up. She previously held executive roles at Bombardier Aerospace, SkyJet Airlines, and Flexjet.

== Career ==
Chung first started working as a ground handler with Piedmont Airlines in the 1980s, aircraft marshalling and loading luggage at Logan International Airport. She occasionally worked at the ticket counter for additional money. At the age of 25, after US Airways acquired Piedmont, Chung began working in corporate sales where her quota was $25 million. She was recruited by Bombardier Aerospace in 2000 as a sales director in its air charter division. Chung later worked as vice president of sales of Bombardier's US West Coast region. Chung held executive roles at SkyJet Airlines. As Flexjet's vice president of sales, she led the strategic deal and sales organization team to generated $835 million in revenue.

In 2014, Chung founded a consulting practice focused on executive level sales training. She consulted for airline executive Alex Wilcox who hired Chung as president of JetSuite in August 2018. Chung is the first African American to serve as president of a private aviation company in the United States. As president, Chung reimaged JetSuite as a luxury airline by upgrading the fleet and improving service. During this period, the Human Rights Campaign declared JetSuite one of the best places to work. The airline filed for Chapter 11 bankruptcy in April 2020.

In August 2020, Chung became the inaugural chief growth officer of Wheels Up. In this role, Chung oversees client acquisition to increase revenue by diversifying the membership base. For Breast Cancer Awareness Month in 2020, Chung led the Wheels Up Cares initiative to raise awareness and funds for the Dubin Breast Center of The Tisch Cancer Institute at Mount Sinai Hospital in Manhattan.

Chung serves on the National Business Aviation Association advisory council.

== Personal life ==
Chung was born on an air base. She was a military brat who moved frequently due to her father who was a master sergeant in the United States Air Force. In 2008, Chung was diagnosed with breast cancer. She married c. 1990. As of August 2020, Chung is based in Dallas. Her daughter founded the nonprofit, Elevation Society, aimed at decreasing youth suicides.
