= Theuns Fraser =

South African lawn bowler

Personal information
- Nationality: South Africa
- Born: 20 January 1951 (age 75)

Sport
- Sport: lawn bowls
- Club: 'The Nest'
Medal record
Representing South Africa
World Outdoor Championships
Bronze medal – third place	1996 Adelaide	triples
Commonwealth Games
Bronze medal – third place	1998 Kuala Lumpur	pairs
Silver medal – second place	2002 Manchester	fours

Theuns Fraser is a former South African international lawn bowler and current South African head coach and selector.

== Bowls career ==
He won a bronze medal in the triples at the 1996 World Outdoor Bowls Championship in Adelaide.

He also won a bronze at the 1998 Commonwealth Games and a silver medal at the 2002 Manchester.

He won the 2016 fours at the National Championships bowling for 'The Nest' Bowls Club.
