= Trish Steyn =

Lawn bowler

Personal information
- Nationality: South African
- Born: 19 January 1952 (age 74)
Medal record
Women's lawn bowls
Representing South Africa
World Outdoor Championships
Gold medal – first place	2004 Leamington Spa	Women's triples
Commonwealth Games
Gold medal – first place	1998 Kuala Lumpur	Women's fours
Atlantic Bowls Championships
Gold medal – first place	1999 Cape Town	fours

Patricia 'Trish' Ann Steyn (born 1952) is a South African international lawn bowler.

== Bowls career ==
Steyn won the gold medal in the women's fours at the 1998 Commonwealth Games in Kuala Lumpur, the team consisted of Loraine Victor, Hester Bekker and Lorna Trigwell.

The following year in 1999, she won the fours gold medal at the Atlantic Bowls Championships with Ellen Cawker, Bekker and Lorna Trigwell.

Five years later she won another gold with Jill Hackland and Loraine Victor in the Women's triples at the 2004 World Outdoor Bowls Championship in Leamington Spa.
