= Andrea Stadnyk =

Canadian lawn bowler

Personal information
- Nationality: Canadian
- Born: 19 April 1977 (age 49)
Medal record
Representing (Canada)
Asia Pacific Bowls Championships
Silver medal – second place	2003 Brisbane	triples

Andrea Jayne Stadnyk (born 1977) is a Canadian international lawn bowler.

== Bowls career ==
Stadnyk has represented Canada at the Commonwealth Games, in the triples at the 2006 Commonwealth Games.

She won a silver medal at the 2003 Asia Pacific Bowls Championships in Brisbane.
