= Wendy Jensen =

New Zealand lawn bowler

Personal information
- Nickname: Wenz
- Nationality: New Zealand
- Born: 22 January 1964 (age 62)
- Occupation: Sewing Machinist

Sport
- Sport: Lawn Bowls
Medal record
Representing New Zealand
World Outdoor Championships
| Bronze medal – third place | 2004 Leamington Spa | triples |
Commonwealth Games
| Bronze medal – third place | 2002 Manchester | fours |

Wendy Jensen (born 22 January 1964 in Auckland, New Zealand) is a lawn bowls competitor for New Zealand.

== Bowls career ==
=== World Championship ===
Jensen won a bronze medal at the 2004 World Outdoor Bowls Championship in Leamington Spa.

=== Commonwealth Games ===
Jensen won a bronze medal in the women's fours at the 2002 Commonwealth Games.

=== Asia Pacific ===
Jensen has won two gold medals at the Asia Pacific Bowls Championships, the latest at the 2019 Asia Pacific Bowls Championships in the Gold Coast, Queensland.
