= Alison Camacho =

Jersey bowler (born 1976)

Alison Camacho née Alison Birch
Personal information
- Born: 18 September 1976 (age 49) Jersey, Channel Islands

Sport
- Club: Sun Bowls BC
Medal record
Representing Jersey
Atlantic Bowls Championships
| Silver medal – second place | 1997 Llandrindod Wells | triples |
British Isles Championships
| Gold medal – first place | 2013 | fours |
| Gold medal – first place | 2015 | fours |

Alison Camacho (born 1976) née Alison Birch is a Jersey international lawn and indoor bowler.

== Bowls career ==
In 1997 under her maiden name Alison Birch she won triples silver medal at the Atlantic Bowls Championships.

She was selected to represent Jersey at the 2002 Commonwealth Games in the pairs. Twelve years later she competed in the triples and fours at the 2014 Commonwealth Games in Glasgow.

Camacho is a two times British champion after winning the fours titles in 2013 and 2015 at the British Isles Bowls Championships.
