= Katrina Wright =

Australian international lawn bowler (born 1981)

Personal information
- Nationality: Australia
- Born: 13 February 1981 (age 45)

Sport
- Club: Cabramatta BC
Medal record
Representing Australia
World Outdoor Championships
Silver medal – second place	2004 Leamington Spa	triples
Silver medal – second place	2004 Leamington Spa	team

Katrina Wright (born 1981) is an Australian international lawn bowler.

Wright made her Australian debut in 2004 and won the silver medal in the triples at the 2004 World Outdoor Bowls Championship.
