= Anita Nivala =

Canadian international lawn bowler (born 1961)

Personal information
- Nationality: Canadian
- Born: 6 April 1961 (age 65) Ladysmith, British Columbia, Canada

Sport
- Club: Regina LBC
Medal record
Representing Canada
Lawn bowls
Commonwealth Games
Silver medal – second place	2002 Manchester	fours
Asia Pacific Bowls Championships
Gold medal – first place	1993 Victoria	fours
Bronze medal – third place	1995 Dunedin	singles
Silver medal – second place	2003 Brisbane	triples

Anita Louise Nivala (born 1961) is a Canadian international lawn bowler.

== Bowls career ==
She won a silver medal in the fours with Shirley Fitzpatrick-Wong, Andrea Weigand and Melissa Ranger at the 1998 Commonwealth Games in Kuala Lumpur.

Two years later she just missed out on a medal after losing the bronze medal play off to New Zealand at the 2004 World Outdoor Bowls Championship - Women's Triples. She plays for the Regina Lawn Bowling Club in Regina, Saskatchewan.

She won three medals at the Asia Pacific Bowls Championships including a gold medal in the 1993 fours, in Victoria, Canada.
