= 2004 World Outdoor Bowls Championship =

World bowls event

World Outdoor Championships 2004
- 10th World Outdoor Bowls Championships
- Location: Ayr, Scotland, (Men's); Leamington Spa, England, (Women's)
- Date(s): 23 July – 7 August, 2004 (men's); 3–17 September 2004 (women's)
- Category: World Bowls Championship

The 2004 World Outdoor Bowls Championship was held at the Northfield Bowls Complex in Ayr, Scotland, from 23 July to 7 August 2004 and Victoria Park, Leamington Spa in England, one month later.

Steve Glasson won the men's singles Gold defeating Alex Marshall in the final. Canada claimed the pairs, Scotland took the triples and Ireland won the fours. The Leonard Trophy was won by Scotland for the fifth time extending their impressive record.

Originally the women's championships were going to take place in Kuala Lumpur, Malaysia, during 2003 but due to political reasons it was moved to England the following year. Margaret Johnston won her third singles crown setting a new record. New Zealand won the pairs, South Africa the triples and England the fours. The Taylor Trophy was won by England for the fourth time.

== Medallists ==
Event	Gold	Silver	Bronze
Men's singles	(Australia); Steve Glasson	(Scotland); Alex Marshall	(New Zealand); Russell Meyer
Men's pairs	(Canada); Keith Roney; Ryan Bester	Noel Graham; Jim Baker	(Wales); Jason Greenslade; Robert Weale
Men's triples	(Scotland); Jim McIntyre; Willie Wood; David Peacock	(New Zealand); Rowan Brassey; Sean Johnson; Gary Lawson	(England); Mervyn King; Robert Newman; Andy Thomson
Men's fours	Jonathan Ross; Noel Graham; Neil Booth; Jim Baker	(Australia); Brett Duprez; Kelvin Kerkow; Kevin Walsh; Michael Wilks	(England); John Rednall; Mervyn King; Robert Newman; Andy Thomson
Men's team	Scotland	New Zealand	Ireland
Women's singles	Margaret Johnston	(South Africa); Lorna Trigwell	(Scotland); Margaret Letham
Women's pairs	(New Zealand); Jo Edwards; Sharon Sims	(Wales); Betty Morgan; Caroline Taylor	(Australia); Karen Murphy; Maria Rigby
Women's triples	(South Africa); Trish Steyn; Jill Hackland; Loraine Victor	(Australia); Katrina Wright; Jenny Harragon; Roma Dunn	(New Zealand); Marlene Castle; Wendy Jensen; Val Smith
Women's fours	(England); Jayne Christie; Jean Baker; Amy Monkhouse; Ellen Falkner	(Jersey); Christine Grimes; Suzie Dingle; Gean O'Neil; Karina Bisson	(Wales); Caroline Taylor; Linda Evans; Anwen Butten; Kathy Pearce
Women's team	England	Australia	Wales

== Results ==
=== W.M.Leonard Trophy (team) ===
Pos	Team	Singles	Pairs	Triples	Fours	Total
1	Scotland	23	20	24	20	87+
2	New Zealand	22	21	23	21	87
3	Ireland	9	23	21	24	77
4	England	20	12	22	22	76
5	Australia	24	11	17	23	75
6	South Africa	18	18	20	18	74
7	Wales	17	22	12	17	68
8	Zimbabwe	10	19	19	10	58
9	Israel	19	15	11	11	56
10	Jersey	14	13	15	12	54
11	Canada	7	24	7	15	53
12	Namibia	11	16	8	16	51
13	Philippines	4	14	18	13	49
14	Hong Kong	8	17	14	8	47
15	Malaysia	16	10	10	5	41
16	(Eswatini) Swaziland	13	3	16	9	41
17	Brazil	12	8	4	14	38
18	United States	15	7	9	6	37
19	Fiji	21	6	3	4	34
20	Spain	2	5	5	19	31
21	Kenya	6	4	13	7	30
22	Samoa	5	9	6	1	21
23	Japan	3	1	2	2	8
24	Norfolk Island	1	2	1	3	7

+ Scotland won on points difference +135 to +121

=== Taylor Trophy (team) ===
Pos	Player	Singles	Pairs	Triples	Fours	Total
1	England	22	25	24	28	99+
2	Australia	25	27	27	20	99
3	Wales	26	28	19	26	99
4	South Africa	28	17	28	23	96
5	Scotland	27	23	18	25	93
6	New Zealand	13	29	26	24	92
7	Jersey	9	20	23	27	79

+ Won by virtue of having more shots
