= Alex Wilcox =

American businessman

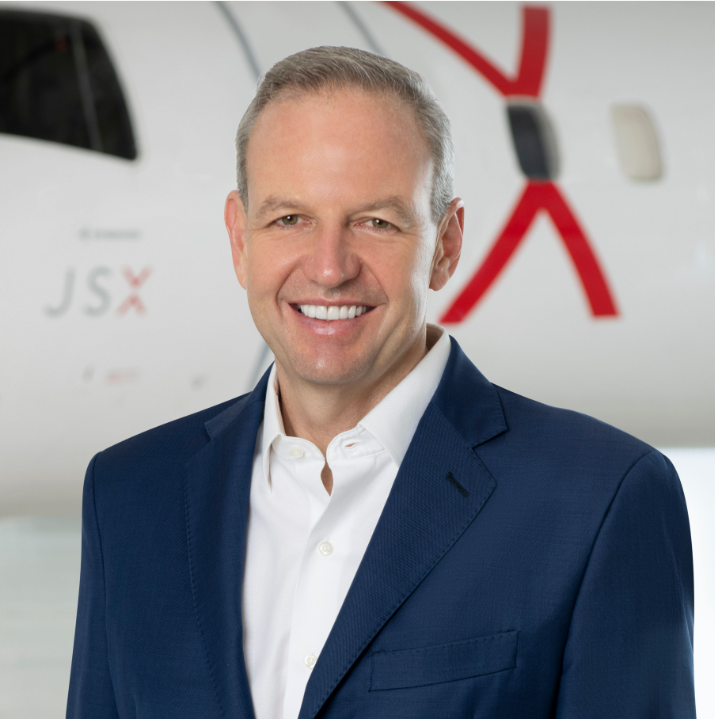
- Born: London, United Kingdom
- Citizenship: United States
- Education: University of Vermont
- Occupations: Entrepreneur, executive, crewmember
- Title: CEO of JSX
- Spouse: Sara Wilcox
- Children: 2

Alex Wilcox is an American airline executive and businessman. He co-founded JetSuiteX, since renamed JSX, and is JSX's CEO. Wilcox was a founding executive of JetBlue Airways as well as president and COO of Kingfisher Airlines until 2006. Wilcox started his career in customer service at Virgin Atlantic Airways, where he helped David Tait, who headed US Virgin Atlantic.

== Early life and education ==
Wilcox was born in London, United Kingdom to an American father and a Swiss mother. He later attended the University of Vermont and earned a BA in political science and English. While in college, Wilcox worked for Southwest Airlines. After college, Wilcox managed the Naildrivers, a rock band, for two years.

Wilcox is a citizen of the United States.

== Career ==
Wilcox worked in a customer service job at Virgin Atlantic Airways. During that time, Wilcox helped review business plans and liked a plan by David Neeleman, founder of Morris Air. He joined Neeleman and launched JetBlue Airways in 1999. Wilcox worked at JetBlue for six years and left to launch Kingfisher Airlines. In 2006, Wilcox partnered with Proctor Capital Partners and wrote the business plan for JetSuite, a business jet charter company. In July 2007, Wilcox began to serve as CEO of JetSuite.
