= Jill Hackland =

South African international lawn bowler (born 1947)

Personal information
- Nationality: South African
- Born: 10 September 1947 (age 78)

Sport
- Sport: lawn bowls
- Club: Umhlali BC
Medal record
Women's lawn bowls
Representing South Africa
World Outdoor Championships
Gold medal – first place	2004 Leamington Spa	Women's triples
Commonwealth Games
Silver medal – second place	2002 Manchester	Women's pairs

Jill Hackland is a South African international lawn bowler.

== Bowls career ==
Hackland won the silver medal in the women's pairs at the 2002 Commonwealth Games in Manchester.

In 2004, she won a gold medal with Trish Steyn and Loraine Victor in the women's triples.

She won the 2013 singles at the National Championships bowling for the Umhlali Bowls Club.
