= Maria Rigby =

Australian international lawn bowler (born 1962)

Personal information
- Nationality: Australian
- Born: 21 April 1962 (age 64) Papua New Guinea

Sport
- Club: Cabramatta BC
Medal record
Representing Australia
World Outdoor Championships
Bronze medal – third place	2004 Leamington Spa	pairs
Silver medal – second place	2004 Leamington Spa	team
Asia Pacific Bowls Championships
Bronze medal – third place	2003 Brisbane	fours

Akam Maria Rigby (born 1962 in Papua New Guinea) is an Australian international lawn bowler.

Rigby made her Australian debut in 1997 and won a bronze medal in the pairs with Karen Murphy at the 2004 World Outdoor Bowls Championship in Leamington Spa.

She won a bronze medal at the 2003 Asia Pacific Bowls Championships in Brisbane.

In 2021, she won the fours title with Isabella Lawson, Leigh Fortington and Ester Regan at the delayed 2020 Australian National Bowls Championships.
