= Jayne Christie =

British lawn bowler

Personal information
- Nationality: British (English)
- Born: Q4, 1962 Biggleswade district, Bedfordshire

Sport
- Club: Potton BC
Medal record
Women's lawn bowls
Representing England
World Outdoor Championships
Gold medal – first place	2004 Leamington Spa	Women's fours
Gold medal – first place	2004 Leamington Spa	Women's team
European Bowls Championships
Gold medal – first place	2003 Ayr	team
English Nationals
Gold medal – first place	2013	mixed fours

Jayne Christie (née Measures; born 1962) is an English international lawn bowler.

== Bowls career ==
She finished runner-up in the 1999 national singles.

Christie made her international debut in 2000 and later captained England in 2008. She was runner-up in the 1999 & 2002 National Championships singles. In 2003 she was part of the England team that won Team gold medal at the European Bowls Team Championships in Vilamoura.

In 2004, she won the gold medal in the fours with Jean Baker, Amy Monkhouse and Ellen Falkner at the 2004 World Outdoor Bowls Championship.

She went on to win National Mixed Fours title in 2013 with Nick Brett, Ellen Falkner and Chris Falkner.

She is also a member of the selection committee for Bowls England.

In 2023, bowling for Potton BC, she finished runner-up in the women's singles during the 2023 Bowls England National Finals, losing to Stef Branfield. It was the third time this had happened, having finished runner-up in 1999 (as Jayne Smith) and also in 2002, when bowling for Henlow Park BC.
