= Amy Pharaoh =

British lawn bowler (born 1979)

Personal information
- Born: 20 March 1979 (age 47) Grimsby, England

Sport
- Club: Cleethorpes BC

Achievements and titles
- Highest world ranking: 12 (June 2025)
Medal record
Women's lawn bowls
Representing England
World Outdoor Championships
| Gold medal – first place | 2004 Leamington Spa | fours |
| Gold medal – first place | 2004 Leamington Spa | team |
| Gold medal – first place | 2023 Gold Coast | fours |
| Bronze medal – third place | 2023 Gold Coast | pairs |
| Silver medal – second place | 2023 Gold Coast | team |
Commonwealth Games
| Bronze medal – third place | 2002 Manchester | pairs |
| Bronze medal – third place | 2006 Melbourne | triples |
| Gold medal – first place | 2010 Delhi | pairs |
| Silver medal – second place | 2022 Birmingham | pairs |
| Gold medal – first place | 2026 Glasgow | pairs |
World Indoor Championships
| Gold medal – first place | 2004 Yarmouth | Mixed pairs |
Atlantic Bowls Championships
| Gold medal – first place | 2007 Ayr | triples |
| Gold medal – first place | 2011 Paphos | fours |
British Isles Championships
| Gold medal – first place | 2012 | pairs |
| Gold medal – first place | 2012 | fours |
European Championships
| Gold medal – first place | 2024 Ayr | singles |

Amy Pharaoh (born 20 March 1979 in Grimsby), also known as Amy Gowshall and Amy Monkhouse, is an English international lawn and indoor bowler. She reached a career high ranking of world number 12 in June 2025.

== Personal life ==
In August 2002, she married and became Amy Monkhouse. She has since reverted to her birth name of Amy Gowshall but then remarried in 2022 to become Amy Pharaoh.

== Career ==
Gowshall won the National junior singles four times in 1996, 1999, 2001 and 2002. The first was at age 17.

Gowshall won a bronze medal in the Women's pairs at the 2002 Commonwealth Games in Manchester.

In 2004, she won the gold medal in the fours with Jayne Christie, Jean Baker and Ellen Falkner at the 2004 World Outdoor Bowls Championship.

She won a bronze medal at the 2006 Commonwealth Games before representing England at the 2010 Commonwealth Games where she won, with Ellen Falkner, a gold medal in the woman's pairs competition.

In 2007 she won the triples gold medal at the Atlantic Bowls Championships and in 2011 she won the fours gold medal at the Atlantic Championships.

In 2018, she won the National Two Wood Singles defeating Rebecca Field in the final and also finished runner-up to Sophie Tolchard in the 2018 National Singles

In 2022, under the name of Amy Pharaoh she competed at the 2022 Commonwealth Games in the women's singles and the women's pairs at the Games. In the pairs with Sophie Tolchard she secured a silver medal.

In 2023, she was selected as part of the team to represent England at the 2023 World Outdoor Bowls Championship. She participated in the women's pairs and the women's fours events. In the fours, her team won the gold medal defeating Australia in the final.

In 2024, Pharaoah was named in the team for the 2024 European Bowls Championships and won the gold medal in the singles.

Pharaoh won her 14th and 15th national outdoor tites in the pairs and triples respectively at the 2025 Bowls England National Finals.

Playing with Sian Honnor, she won the gold medal in the women's pairs at the 2026 Commonwealth Games in Glasgow, defeating Syafiqa Haidar and Aleena Nawawi of Malaysia in the final.

=== National titles ===
- 1996 junior singles
- 1998 CofC singles
- 1999 CofC singles
- 1999 junior singles
- 2001 junior singles
- 2002 junior singles
- 2011 pairs
- 2011 fours
- 2011 mixed pairs
- 2012 CofC singles
- 2013 CofC singles
- 2018 CofC singles
- 2018 2w singles
- 2025 pairs
- 2025 triples
