= Anne Simon (bowls) =

Guernsey international lawn bowler

Personal information
- Nationality: British (Guernsey)
Medal record
Representing Guernsey
Atlantic Bowls Championships
Bronze medal – third place	1997 Llandrindod Wells	pairs

Anne Simon is a former Guernsey international lawn bowler.

== Bowls career ==
Simon has represented Guernsey at two Commonwealth Games, at the 1994 Commonwealth Games and the 2002 Commonwealth Games.

In 1997, she won the pairs bronze medal with Jean Simon, at the Atlantic Bowls Championships.
