= Betty Morgan (bowls) =

Welsh international lawn and indoor bowler

Betty Morgan MBE
Personal information
- Nationality: British (Welsh)
- Born: 9 May 1942 (age 84) Llandrindod Wells, Wales

Sport
- Sport: Lawn and indoor bowls
- Club: Llandrindod Wells BC
Medal record
Representing Wales
World Outdoor Championships
Bronze medal – third place	1996 Leamington Spa	Women's triples
Silver medal – second place	2004 Leamington Spa	Women's pairs
Bronze medal – third place	2004 Leamington Spa	Women's team
Commonwealth Games
Silver medal – second place	2006 Melbourne	Women's singles
Atlantic Bowls Championships
Silver medal – second place	1993 Florida	fours
Bronze medal – third place	1997 Llandrindod Wells	singles
Gold medal – first place	1997 Llandrindod Wells	triples
Silver medal – second place	2005 Bangor	singles
British Isles Championships
Gold medal – first place	1995	singles
Gold medal – first place	1998	singles
Gold medal – first place	2003	singles
Gold medal – first place	1994	pairs
Gold medal – first place	1995	pairs
Gold medal – first place	1996	pairs
Gold medal – first place	2003	pairs
Gold medal – first place	2011	pairs
Gold medal – first place	1990	triples
Gold medal – first place	2003	triples
Gold medal – first place	1978	fours
Gold medal – first place	1999	fours
Gold medal – first place	2011	fours

Elizabeth 'Betty' Mary Morgan MBE (born 9 May 1942) is a Welsh international lawn and indoor bowler. She was appointed an MBE in 2005.

== Bowls career ==
Morgan made her Welsh debut in 1976 and won multiple Welsh national titles.

=== World Outdoor Championship ===
Morgan won the bronze medal in the women's triples during the 1996 World Outdoor Bowls Championship and a silver medal with Caroline Taylor in the women's pairs at the 2004 World Outdoor Bowls Championship in Leamington Spa.

=== Commonwealth Games ===
Morgan won a silver medal in the singles at the 2006 Commonwealth Games. She also competed in the fours at the 1994 Commonwealth Games and in the singles at the 2002 Commonwealth Games.

=== Atlantic Championships ===
In 1993 she won the fours silver medal at the Atlantic Bowls Championships and four years later in her home country she won the singles bronze medal and the triples gold medal. A fourth medal was won in 2005 when she won the singles silver medal at the Championships.

=== British Isles ===
Morgan has won the British Isles Bowls Championships singles title three times in 1995, 1998 and 2003, a record only bettered by Irish bowler Margaret Johnston. In addition to the three singles titles she has won ten other British Isles titles; pairs (1994, 1995, 1996, 2003 and 2011), triples (1990 & 2003), fours (1978, 1999 & 2011). The 2003 success created history because she was the first woman to win the singles, pairs and triples in the same year.

=== National ===
Outdoors, Morgan has won 26 Welsh National Bowls Championships.

- singles - 1984, 1986, 1991, 1994, 1997, 2002
- pairs - 1980, 1993, 1994, 1995, 2002, 2010, 2011, 2019
- triples - 1989, 1999, 2002, 2009
- fours - 1977, 1983, 1993, 1998, 1999, 2010, 2014, 2016
