= Sharon Sims =

New Zealand lawn bowler (born 1952)

Sharon Sims MNZM
Personal information
- Born: 24 May 1952 (age 74) Te Kōpuru, New Zealand

Sport
- Country: New Zealand
- Sport: Bowls
- Club: Takaro bc
Medal record
Representing New Zealand
Women's lawn bowls
Commonwealth Games
Gold medal – first place	2002 Manchester	Pairs
World Outdoor Championships
Gold medal – first place	2000 Moama	Fours
Gold medal – first place	2000 Moama	Triples
Gold medal – first place	2004 Leamington Spa	Pairs
Bronze medal – third place	2008 Christchurch	Triples
Silver medal – second place	2008 Christchurch	Team
Asia Pacific Bowls Championships
Bronze medal – third place	1997 Warilla	triples
Bronze medal – third place	1997 Warilla	fours
Gold medal – first place	1999 Kuala Lumpur	triples
Gold medal – first place	1999 Kuala Lumpur	fours
Gold medal – first place	2001 Melbourne	pairs
Silver medal – second place	2001 Melbourne	fours
Gold medal – first place	2003 Brisbane	fours
Bronze medal – third place	2005 Melbourne	pairs

Sharon Elmar Sims MNZM (born 24 May 1952) is a New Zealand lawn bowls international.

== Bowls career ==
At the 2002 Commonwealth Games she won a gold medal along with Jo Edwards in the women's pairs event. At the World Bowls Championships in 2000 she was a triples and fours champion, and in 2004 a pairs champion.

She won eight medals at the Asia Pacific Bowls Championships, four of which have been gold medals.

Sims won the 2002 & 2005 singles title and the 1993, 2006, 2007 & 2009 pairs title at the New Zealand National Bowls Championships when bowling for the Hamilton Bowls Club.

== Honours and awards ==
In the 2007 Queen's Birthday Honours, Sims was appointed a Member of the New Zealand Order of Merit, for services to lawn bowls. In 2013, she was an inaugural inductee into the Bowls New Zealand Hall of Fame.
