= Roma Dunn =

Australian international lawn bowler

Personal information
- Nationality: Australian
- Born: 9 March 1943 (age 83) Cunderdin, Western Australia

Sport
- Club: Safety Bay BC
Medal record
Representing Australia
World Outdoor Championships
Bronze medal – third place	2000 Moama	triples
Bronze medal – third place	2000 Moama	fours
Silver medal – second place	2000 Moama	team
Silver medal – second place	2004 Leamington Spa	triples
Silver medal – second place	2004 Leamington Spa	team
Commonwealth Games
Silver medal – second place	2006 Melbourne	triples
Asia Pacific Bowls Championships
Silver medal – second place	1995 Dunedin	triples
Silver medal – second place	1995 Dunedin	fours
Gold medal – first place	1997 Warilla	singles
Bronze medal – third place	1997 Warilla	pairs
Silver medal – second place	1999 Kuala Lumpur	triples
Gold medal – first place	2001 Melbourne	triples
Gold medal – first place	2001 Melbourne	fours

Roma Elizabeth Dunn (born 1943) is an Australian international lawn bowler.

== Bowls career ==
Dunn made her Australian debut in 1995 and won double bronze in the triples and fours at the 2000 World Outdoor Bowls Championship in Moama.

She won the silver medal in the triples at the 2004 World Outdoor Bowls Championship.

She won seven medals at the Asia Pacific Bowls Championships including three gold medals.
