= Loraine Victor =

South African international lawn bowler (born 1948)

Personal information
- Nationality: South African
- Born: 23 September 1948 (age 77)

Sport
- Sport: lawn bowls
- Club: Wingate Park BC
Medal record
Representing South Africa
Commonwealth Games
Gold medal – first place	1998 Kuala Lumpur	Women's fours
World Outdoor Championships
Gold medal – first place	2004 Leamington Spa	Women's triples
Gold medal – first place	2008 Christchurch	Women's triples
Atlantic Bowls Championships
Silver medal – second place	2007 Ayr	fours

Loraine Victor is a South African international lawn bowler.

== Bowls career ==
In 1998 Victor was part of the fours team that won gold at the 1998 Commonwealth Games in Kuala Lumpur.

She also won a gold medal in the Women's Triples at the 2004 World Outdoor Bowls Championship in Leamington Spa and four years later repeated the achievement by winning another gold medal in the Women's Triples at the 2008 World Outdoor Bowls Championship in Christchurch.

In 2007 she won the fours silver medal at the Atlantic Bowls Championships.

She won the 2017 singles and two fours titles at the National Championships bowling for the Wingate Park Bowls Club.
