= Jean Simon (bowls) =

Personal information
- Nationality: British (Guernsey)
Medal record
Representing Guernsey
Atlantic Bowls Championships
Bronze medal – third place	1993 Florida	triples
Bronze medal – third place	1997 Llandrindod Wells	pairs

Jean Simon is a former Guernsey international lawn bowler.

== Bowls career ==
Simon has represented Guernsey at two Commonwealth Games, at the 1994 Commonwealth Games and the 2002 Commonwealth Games.

In 1993, she won the triples bronze medal, with Eunice Thompson and Sally Paul, at the Atlantic Bowls Championships and in 1997 added the pairs bronze (with Anne Simon) from the Llandrindod Wells event.
