= Jenny Harragon =

Australian lawn bowler

Personal information
- Nationality: Australia
- Born: 30 December 1952 (age 73) Gympie
- Died: 20/5/2018

Sport
- Club: Kandanga BC
Medal record
Representing Australia
World Outdoor Championships
Silver medal – second place	2004 Leamington Spa	triples
Silver medal – second place	2004 Leamington Spa	team

Jenny Harragon (born 1952) is a former Australian international lawn bowler.

Harragon made her Australian debut in 2001 and won the silver medal in the triples at the 2004 World Outdoor Bowls Championship.

She announced her international retirement in 2005.
