= Jean Baker (bowls) =

English international lawn bowler

Personal information
- Nationality: English
- Born: 31 March 1958 (age 68) Huthwaite, Nottinghamshire
Medal record
Representing England
World Outdoor Championships
Bronze medal – third place	1992 Ayr	Women's fours
Bronze medal – third place	1996 Leamington Spa	Women's fours
Silver medal – second place	1996 Leamington Spa	Women's team
Bronze medal – third place	2000 Moama	Women's pairs
Gold medal – first place	2000 Moama	Women's team
Gold medal – first place	2004 Leamington Spa	Women's fours
Gold medal – first place	2004 Leamington Spa	Women's team
Commonwealth Games
Bronze medal – third place	1998 Kuala Lumpur	Women's singles
Bronze medal – third place	2006 Melbourne	Women's triples
Atlantic Bowls Championships
Gold medal – first place	2007 Ayr	triples
British Isles Championships
Gold medal – first place	2007	triples
Gold medal – first place	2007	fours

Jean Baker (born 1958, in Huthwaite) is a former English international lawn and indoor bowler.

== Bowls career ==
=== World Championships ===
Baker won bronze medals at the 1992 World Outdoor Bowls Championship, 1996 World Outdoor Bowls Championship and 2000 World Outdoor Bowls Championship. In 2004, she won the gold medal in the fours with Jayne Christie, Amy Monkhouse and Ellen Falkner at the 2004 World Outdoor Bowls Championship.

=== Commonwealth Games ===
Baker represented England in the fours event, at the 1994 Commonwealth Games in Victoria, British Columbia, Canada. She won bronze medals at the 1998 Commonwealth Games and 2006 Commonwealth Games, in addition to competing in the 2002 Commonwealth Games.

=== Other ===
In 2007 she won the triples gold medal at the Atlantic Bowls Championships.

Baker has won five English national titles at the English National Bowls Championships; the 1989 singles, 1997 fours, 2006 triples & fours and the 2009 pairs. She subsequently won the 2007 triples and fours at the British Isles Bowls Championships.
