= Ellen Falkner =

British bowls player (born 1979)

Ellen Falkner MBE
Personal information
- Nationality: British (English)
- Born: 12 June 1979 (age 47) Wisbech, England
Medal record
Representing England
Commonwealth Games
Gold medal – first place	2002 Manchester	fours
Gold medal – first place	2010 Delhi	pairs
Gold medal – first place	2014 Glasgow	triples
Bronze medal – third place	2018 Gold Coast	triples
World Outdoor Championships
Gold medal – first place	2004 Leamington Spa	fours
Gold medal – first place	2004 Leamington Spa	team
Silver medal – second place	2008 Christchurch	singles
Silver medal – second place	2008 Christchurch	pairs
Silver medal – second place	2016 Christchurch	fours
Bronze medal – third place	2016 Christchurch	pairs
World Indoor Bowls Championships
Gold medal – first place	2005 Yarmouth	singles
Gold medal – first place	2006 Yarmouth	singles
Gold medal – first place	2016 Yarmouth	singles
Gold medal – first place	2019 Yarmouth	mixed pairs
Atlantic Bowls Championships
Gold medal – first place	2005 Bangor	triples
Gold medal – first place	2005 Bangor	fours
Bronze medal – third place	2009 Johannesburg	singles
Silver medal – second place	2009 Johannesburg	pairs
Gold medal – first place	2011 Paphos	fours
Silver medal – second place	2011 Paphos	triples
Silver medal – second place	2015 Paphos	triples
Bronze medal – third place	2015 Paphos	fours
British Isles Championships
Gold medal – first place	2012	singles
Gold medal – first place	2009	pairs
Gold medal – first place	2013	pairs
Gold medal – first place	2018	pairs
Gold medal – first place	2008	fours

Ellen Marie Falkner MBE (née Alexander; born 12 June 1979) is an English international lawn and indoor bowler from Cambridge, England. Falkner was appointed Member of the Order of the British Empire (MBE) in the 2020 Birthday Honours for services to lawn bowls.

== Personal life ==
She retired from international bowls and relocated to Australia in 2021 after being appointed as Bowls Australia’s High Performance Manager for Para Bowls.

== Bowls career ==
=== World Championships ===
In 2004, she won the gold medal in the fours with Jayne Christie, Jean Baker and Amy Monkhouse at the 2004 World Outdoor Bowls Championship. In 2016, she was part of the fours team with Rebecca Wigfield, Wendy King and Jamie-Lea Winch who won the silver medal at the 2016 World Outdoor Bowls Championship in Christchurch. She then won a bronze medal in the pairs with Sophie Tolchard. In 2020 she was selected for the 2020 World Outdoor Bowls Championship in Australia.

=== Commonwealth Games ===
Ellen represented England at the 2002 Commonwealth Games winning gold in the fours and eight years later won another gold at the 2010 Commonwealth Games in the woman's pairs competition with Amy Monkhouse. Ellen also competed in the 2014 Commonwealth Games and won a further gold in the women's triples event with Sophie Tolchard and Sian Gordon. She was selected as part of the England team for the 2018 Commonwealth Games, on the Gold Coast in Queensland where she won a bronze medal in the Triples with Katherine Rednall and Sian Honnor.

=== World Indoor Championship ===
Falkner won a third World Indoor singles title during the 2016 World Indoor Bowls Championship after defeating Rebecca Field in the final. This success came ten years after her previous two victories. In 2019 she won the mixed pairs gold with Robert Paxton at the 2019 World Indoor Bowls Championship. At the 2021 World Indoor Bowls Championship Falkner became the first female player to reach the final of the open pairs event (playing with Greg Harlow).

=== Atlantic Championships ===
In 2005 she won the triples and fours gold medals at the Atlantic Bowls Championships. After a singles bronze and pairs silver in 2009 she won the fours gold medal and triples silver medal at the 2011 Atlantic Championships in Cyprus. Four years later in 2015 she won the triples silver medal and fours bronze medal at the Championships, also in Cyprus.

=== National ===
After winning the 2011 National singles crown she subsequently won the singles at the British Isles Bowls Championships in 2012. She also won the two wood title in 2011 and has won eleven National titles in total; two singles, three CofC, four pairs (2007, 2008, 2012, 2017 all with Sue Alexander), one triples (2007) and one junior title.

In 2023, (Falkner now living in Australia and working as the Bowls Australia High Performance Manager for Para Bowls) won the Australian National Bowls Championships fours title with Jamie-Lee Worsnop, Ellen Ryan and Karen Murphy.

National titles

- 2004 Bowls England National Championships (Women's Junior Pairs)
- 2007 Bowls England National Championships (Women's Pairs)
- 2007 Bowls England National Championships (Women's Triples)
- 2008 Bowls England National Championships (Women's Pairs)
- 2011 Bowls England National Championships (Women's Singles Four Wood)
- 2011 Bowls England National Championships (Women's Singles Two Wood)
- 2012 Bowls England National Championships (Women's Pairs)
- 2017 Bowls England National Championships (Women's Pairs)
- 2017 Bowls England National Championships (Women's Champion of Champions)
- 2019 Bowls England National Championships (Women's Champion of Champions)
- 2021 Bowls England National Championships (Women's Champion of Champions)
- 2023 Australian National Bowls Championships Fours
