= List of Welsh artists =

This is a list of notable artists who were born in Wales and/or known for their work in Wales, arranged alphabetically by surname (and period)

== Born before 1800 ==
- Thomas Barker (1769–1847), painter born in Pontypool
- Frances Bunsen (1791–1876), Monmouthshire painter
- John Gibson (1790–1866), sculptor born near Conwy, moved to Italy to study (and work) in 1817
- Thomas Jones (1742–1803), landscape painter born in Radnorshire
- Edward Owen (died 1741), painter Anglesey
- Richard Wilson (1713–1782), landscape painter and one of the founder members of the Royal Academy Montgomeryshire

== Born 1800–1899 ==
- Thomas Brigstocke (1809–1881), portrait painter
- Francis Dodd (1874–1949), painter and printmaker
- Vincent Evans (1896–1976), painter from Ystalyfera
- James Milo Griffith (1843–1897), sculptor
- John Griffiths (1837–1918), painter who worked in India
- Fanny Price-Gwynne (1819-1901), poet, author, and writer.
- Sir Frank William Brangwyn (1867–1956) painter and muralist
- Nina Hamnett (1890–1956), Tenby-born artist and artists' model, who exhibited at the Royal Academy
- George Frederick Harris (1856–1924), painter who lived and married in Merthyr Tydfil
- James Dickson Innes (1887–1914), Llanelli-born painter
- Augustus John (1878–1961), Tenby-born portrait painter, draughtsman and etcher
- Goscombe John (1860–1952), sculptor
- Gwen John (1876–1939), Haverfordwest-born painter who moved to live and work in France in 1903
- Thyrza Anne Leyshon (1892–1996), Swansea born miniature painter
- Edith (1963–1946) and Gwenddolen Massey (1864–1960), botanists and painters born on Anglesey, known as the Massey Sisters
- Sir Cedric Morris (1889–1982), born in Swansea but left Wales age 17
- Thomas E. Stephens (1885–1966), portrait painter, emigrated to the US
- T. H. Thomas (1839–1915), painter and illustrator active in Cardiff
- Evan Walters (1892–1951), painter
- Henry Clarence Whaite (1828–1912), English artist who settled (and married) in North Wales, forming the Cambrian Academy of Art
- John Laviers Wheatley (1892–1955), Abergavenny-born painter
- Christopher Williams (1873–1934), portrait and landscape painter
- Margaret Lindsay Williams (1888–1960), portrait painter
- Penry Williams (1805–1885), Wales-born painter who lived and worked in Rome from 1827

== Born 1900–1924 ==
- Joan Baker (1922–2017), painter who was the first woman to run a major art department in Wales
- Brenda Chamberlain (1912–1971), Welsh artist, working in Wales and Greece
- Glenys Cour (born 1924), painter and stained glass artist
- Thomas Nathaniel Davies (1922–1996), painter, sculptor and educator
- Arthur Giardelli (1911–2009), London-born painter, moved to Wales in the 1940s, chair of the 56 Group Wales
- Ray Howard-Jones (1903–1996), painter
- Joan Hutt (1913–1985), Hertfordshire-born painter who moved to live in North Wales in 1949
- Alfred Janes (1911–1999), painter
- Ezzelina Jones (1921–2012), sculptor
- Jonah Jones (1919–2004), sculptor
- Heinz Koppel (1919–1980), Berlin-born painter who moved to Wales as a young man
- Mervyn Levy (1915–1996), painter, art dealer, writer and critic
- Eric Malthouse (1914–1997), Eric Malthouse painter, printmaker and co-founder of the 56 Group Wales.
- Stanley Cornwell Lewis MBE (1905–2009), portrait painter and Principal of Carmarthen School of Art
- John Petts (1914–1991), London born artist living in Wales after 1937
- Ceri Richards (1903–1971), Swansea-born painter
- Will Roberts (1907–2000), painter
- Graham Sutherland (1903–1980), English painter who regularly visited Wales, settling in Pembrokeshire in 1967
- David Tinker (1924–2000), painter and co-founder of the 56 Group Wales
- Kyffin Williams (1918–2006), painter

== Born 1925–1949 ==
- Mac Adams (born 1943), conceptual artist and sculptor, based in New York City
- John Beard (born 1943), Aberdare-born painter who emigrated to Australia in 1983
- John Bourne (born 1943), English artist educated in North Wales, founder of the Wrexham group of the Stuckists art movement
- Jim Burns (born 1948), painter and illustrator
- David Carpanini (born 1946), Abergwynfi, Afan Valley, painter, etcher, teacher and printmaker
- Ivor Davies (born 1935), painter, mixed media, installation and mosaic artist
- Ken Elias (born 1944), painter born in Glynneath
- Barry Flanagan (1941–2009), known for his sculptures of hares
- Valerie Ganz (1936–2015), painter
- Tony Goble (1943–2007), painter
- Gareth Griffith (born 1940), painter and sculptor
- David Griffiths (born 1939), portrait painter
- Robert Alwyn Hughes (born 1935), painter
- Aneurin M. Jones (1930–2017), painter
- Colin Jones (1928–1967), painter
- Gwilym Prichard (1931–2015) painter
- Mary Lloyd Jones (born 1934), painter
- Mike Jones (1941–2022), painter
- Wynne Melville Jones (born 1947), painter
- Christine Kinsey (born 1942), painter
- John Knapp-Fisher (1931–2015), painter living and working in Pembrokeshire for almost 50 years
- Geoffrey Olsen (1943–2007), painter born in Merthyr Tydfil
- Rob Piercy (born 1946), painter from Porthmadog
- Peter Prendergast (1946–2007), landscape painter
- Osi Rhys Osmond (1943–2015), painter, educator and TV presenter
- Terry Setch (born 1936), London-born painter who moved to Wales in 1964
- Robert Thomas (1926–1999), bronze sculptor, known for his Cardiff public art
- John Uzzell Edwards (1937–2014), painter from the Rhymney Valley
- Andrew Vicari (1932–2016), painter
- Annie Williams (born 1942), still life watercolour painter who grew up in Wales
- Ernest Zobole (1927–1999), painter, one of the founders of 56 Group Wales
- Ogwyn Davies (1925–2015), painter, ceramist and teacher

== Born 1950–1974 ==
- Iwan Bala (born 1956), painter and mixed media artist, winner of the National Eisteddfod of Wales Gold Medal for fine art in 1997
- Laura Ford (born 1961), sculptor born in Cardiff
- David Garner (born 1958), installation artist
- Clive Hicks-Jenkins (born 1951), painter
- Martyn Jones (born 1955), painter
- Elfyn Lewis (born 1969), painter, winner of the National Eisteddfod of Wales Gold Medal for fine art in 2009
- Eleri Mills (born 1955), painter
- Phil Nicol (born 1953), painter, winner of the National Eisteddfod of Wales Gold Medal for fine art in 2001
- Michael Gustavius Payne (born 1969), painter
- Shani Rhys James (born 1953), Australia-born painter, moved to Wales after graduation
- Phil Rogers (born 1951), potter from Newport
- Alia Syed (born 1964), Swansea-born artist and filmmaker, now living and working in London
- Charles Uzzell Edwards (born 1968), international graffiti artist
- Bedwyr Williams (born 1974), installation and performance artist
- Sue Williams (born 1956), visual artist
- Pete Fowler (born 1969), artist, animator and sculptor
- Barry John (artist) (born 1974), painter, war artist

== Born 1975 and later ==
- Manon Awst (born 1983), sculptor, performance artist
- Dan Llywelyn Hall (born 1980), painter
- Nichola Hope (both born 1975), visual artist
- Sarah Hope (both born 1975), visual artist
- Dan Rees (born 1982), Welsh-born sculptor, painter and photographer
- Nathan Wyburn (born 1989), food artist
- Josh Hicks (born 1991), cartoonist, filmmaker and author

== See also ==
- List of Welsh women artists
