= Daniel Rees =

Daniel Rees may refer to:

- Daniel Rees (priest) (1793–1857), Welsh clergyman and hymnwriter
- Daniel Rees (economist), American economist
- Daniel Rees (politician) (1866–1934), Australian politician
- Dan Rees (rugby) (1876–?), Welsh rugby union and rugby league footballer
- Dan Rees (artist) (born 1982), Welsh artist
