= Contemporary Art Society (disambiguation) =

The Contemporary Art Society is a British charity that purchases artworks for UK art museums.

Contemporary Art Society may also refer to:

- Contemporary Art Society (Australia)
  - Contemporary Art Society (SA Inc.)
- Contemporary Art Society (IMA), an affiliate of the Indianapolis Museum of Art
- Contemporary Art Society for Wales
- Contemporary Arts Society, Canada
