= Norman Toynton =

British abstract painter (1939–2025)

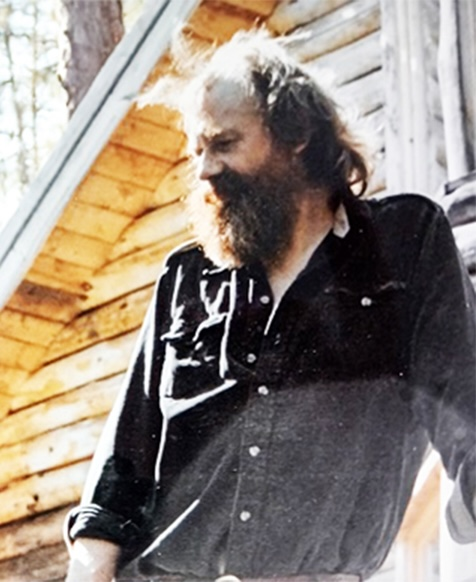
- Born: January 25, 1939; London, England
- Died: June 30, 2025 (aged 86); Sidestrand, Norfolk, England
- Education: Hornsey College of Art, Royal College of Art
- Known for: Painting, Use of Masonite pegboard.
- Website: Official website

Norman Toynton (25 January 1939 – 30 June 2025) was a British abstract painter who lived for many years in the United States, where his work was acclaimed for its "grand visual and tactile splendour" and for "marshal(ling) all the sensuous force of color and oil paint to induce us to look with truly questioning attention". He was the Chair of Fine Arts at the Massachusetts College of Art and exhibited widely in New York and Boston. In 2006, he returned to England, where he lived and worked on the North Norfolk coast.

== Early life and education ==
Born in London on 25 January 1939, Toynton's home was destroyed by bombing during World War 2 and he spent his early childhood in a series of temporary accommodations. His father was a draughtsman of naval charts in the Royal Navy, where he served on the Arctic convoys. When he was 15, Toynton enrolled in the Hornsey College of Art; at 16, he had a painting accepted into the Royal Academy of Art Summer Exhibition.

He went on to study at the Royal College of Art. His classmates included David Hockney, R. B. Kitaj, and Allen Jones. His first trip to the museums in Paris was with Allen Jones and Ken Kiff, his second with David Hockney. According to his widow, Evelyn Toynton, the art critic Mark Hudson told her that Toynton was expelled from the RCA for experimenting with new painting styles in rebellion against his professors.

== Career in the UK ==
In the early 1960s, Toynton was part of the first British Pop Art exhibition at the Grabowski Gallery and participated in the first London happening with Carolee Schneemann at Denison Hall. He was included in the John Moores Liverpool Exhibition, and created an installation piece for the Raume und Environmenten exhibition at the Morsbroich Museum in Leverkusen with Klaus Rinke. He also showed at the Zwemmer Gallery (with John Walker), the RBA Galleries, and numerous other galleries throughout the UK. He began teaching under the radical art educator Tom Hudson at the Leicester College of Art in 1963 and then joined Hudson at the Cardiff College of Art. Working with Hudson, along with Michael Sandle, Terry Setch and Michael Tyzack, was a formative experience for him. Meanwhile, he had become increasingly interested in the art coming out of the United States, particularly after the Jackson Pollock show at the Whitechapel Gallery in 1958, and his work was tending more towards abstraction.

Toynton was a member of 56 Group Wales from 1967 to 1971.

== Career in the United States ==
In 1969, Toynton became the visiting artist at Ohio State University in the U.S; he was then Chairman of the Art Department at the University of Victoria. Later he moved to Boston and became Chair of the Graduate Program in Fine Art at the Massachusetts College of Art.

During the 1970s, he created a number of large installation pieces for solo exhibitions at the Whitechapel Gallery in London, the Institute of Contemporary Art in Boston and the Williams College Museum of Art. At the end of this decade he returned to creating smaller paintings, working with the same material he had begun using in his installations: Masonite pegboard, which he described as "moribund, Orwellian ... It seems to stand for everything that threatens to destroy painting, the most individualistic, human activity I know of". Pegboard, on which he variously painted directly or hung lushly textured and patterned wooden elements, became his trademark. Many of his paintings consist of series of painted Masonite panels, with subtle variations from one to the next, in order to slow the viewer down and compel close scrutiny.

In a review of one of his solo exhibitions in Artnews, David Bonetti called his paintings "works of such authenticity that they are shocking … Toynton dares to salvage beauty from the banal", while Kenneth Baker, in a feature article on him in Artforum, declared, "I know of few abstract painters who have the patience and intelligence to practice their art deliberately enough to let us see painting for the thinking process it is. One of the most accomplished of these is Norman Toynton.".

In the 1980s, Toynton quit his teaching job and moved to New York City, where he showed his work in a wide variety of venues, including the Brooklyn Museum, the Hunter College Gallery, the Ruth Siegel Gallery, the John Good Gallery, the Stux Gallery and the Daniel Newburg Gallery. Arthur C. Danto cited one of his solo exhibitions as among the three outstanding shows of the year in The Nation. Toynton then retreated to rural Vermont, before making several extended trips to India.

== Later life and death ==
In 2006, he returned to England for good, building himself a studio at his home on the North Norfolk coast. His work was then shown at the Art Space Gallery, APT, the Dadiani Gallery and several other London venues, as well as at the Yorkshire Sculpture Park. Yorkshire Sculpture Park .

On 15 September 2025, it was announced that Toynton had died at his home in Sidestrand, Norfolk, in June, at the age of 86.

== Selected collections ==
- Alfonso Ossorio Foundation
- Rose Art Museum
- JP Morgan Chase
- Time Warner
- Other Press
- Williams College Museum of Art
- Museum Narodowe, Warsaw, Poland
- Nottingham City Museum
- National Library of Wales
- Bradford Museum

== Prizes ==
- Lignano Biennale Prize, Italy
- Prix Chateau de la Sarraz, Switzerland
- Pollock-Krasner Foundation Grant
- Adolph and Esther Gottlieb Foundation Grant
