= Robert Alwyn Hughes =

Welsh artist (1935–2020)

- Born: 1935; Dowlais
- Died: 26 December 2020 (aged 84–85); Cheltenham
- Education: Newport College of Art Leicester College of Art Royal College of Art
- Known for: Painting, drawing, filmmaking, photography
- Awards: Welsh Arts Council Purchase Prize
- Elected: The Welsh Group; 56 Group Wales
- Website: robertalwynhughes-art.co.uk

Robert Alwyn Hughes (1935–2020) was a Welsh artist.

== Artwork and childhood ==
Hughes's childhood memories had an impact upon his artwork, with numerous references to Welsh landscape and culture, especially that of the south Wales valleys and Dowlais Top and Caeharris in particular: as a child he would regularly explore the local rugged landscape outside his back-door, just below the Brecon Beacons. His father worked at Bedlinog Colliery and had a love of Welsh literary classics. His mother was a devout Baptist and his uncles bread pigeons and ponies. The family's first language at home was Welsh until young Robert began attending the Dowlais Central School at the age of five years (when he began using English).

A recent body of work, which references an older series, 1961's At Valleys End, highlights the relevance Hughes gives to his past growing up in a south Wales town, alongside a much more global perspective, with modern references to religion and warfare. Hughes puts great importance on needing a "grasp of identity worldwide", merging ideas, symbols and images from a number of different sources.

== Career ==
Hughes studied Fine Art from 1953 to 1957 at Newport College of Art, from 1957 to 1958 at Leicester College of Art and from 1958 to 1961 at the Royal College of Art. Together with painting and exhibiting widely, from 1962 he also taught at Cheltenham College of Art, until retiring from teaching in 1991 to concentrate on painting.

Together with painting, during the 1970s and 1980s Hughes was also active in creating experimental film & photographic work, producing commissioned films under the title, taken from an ancient Welsh poet, Taliesin. He founded the Welsh Modern Art e-newsletter 'WalesModern' in 2003.

== Exhibitions ==
Hughes exhibited widely. His work was first shown at the 1958 National Eisteddfod of Wales, where he was awarded the Welsh Arts Council Purchase Prize. He also exhibited from 1960 to 1961 with the Arts Council of Great Britain, the Welsh Arts Council, the Contemporary Arts Society, Grosvenor Gallery London and Young Contemporaries.

From 1962 onwards he exhibited in Wales and internationally with both solo and mixed shows, including exhibitions as a member of the Watercolour Society of Wales, The Welsh Group and the 56 Group Wales.

His work is in numerous public collections including: Arts Council of Great Britain, Arts Council of Wales, Contemporary Arts Society of Great Britain, Contemporary Arts Society of Wales, Royal College of Art, National Museum of Wales, University of South Wales, Cyfarthfa Castle Museum & Art Gallery, and Newport Museum & Art Gallery, Cambria Airways, P&O Shipping Lines, Gloucestershire Education Authority, Leicestershire Education Authority, Westminster Hospital and Y Gaer.

== Sources ==
- A Wales Art Collection (Art Education for Primary and Secondary Schools). Pub. Genesis
