= Eric Malthouse =

British artist (1914–1997)

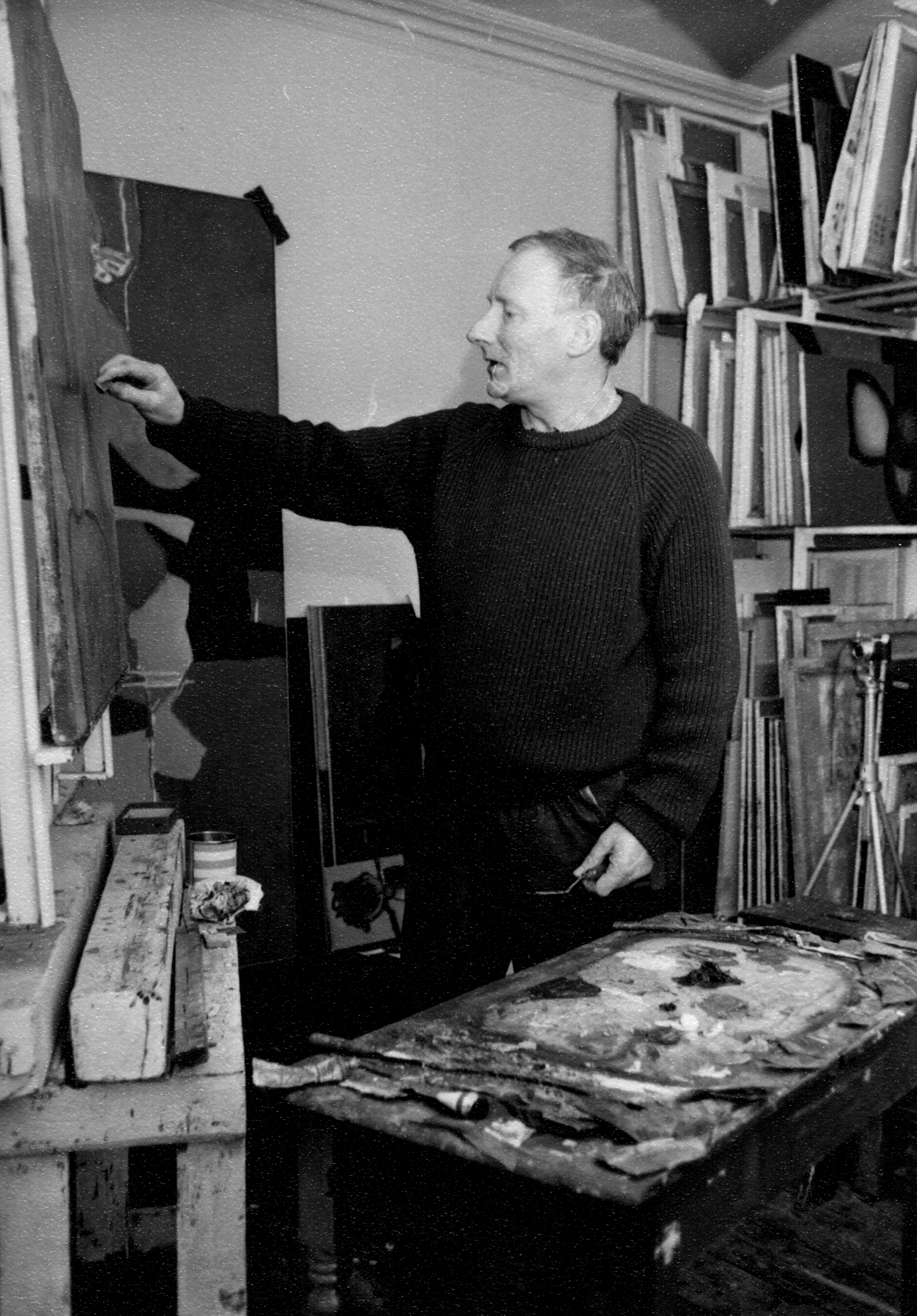
- Eric Malthouse circa 1960
- Born: Eric James Malthouse; 20 August 1914; Erdington, Birmingham, UK.
- Died: 12 April 1997 (aged 82); Penarth, South Wales, UK.
- Known for: Painting and printmaking
- Spouse: Anne May Malthouse (nee Gascoigne)

Eric Malthouse (1914–1997) was a British artist and print maker who spent most of his career in South Wales.

His work can be found in several collections including the Tate, the National Museum of Wales, the National Library of Wales, Aberystwyth University, Art UK and the Government Art Collection.

== Life ==
Malthouse was born in Erdington, Birmingham in 1914. He went to King Edward V1 Aston School and from 1931 to 1937 he studied at Birmingham College of Arts & Crafts (now Birmingham School of Art). He was Art Master (1938–39) at Salt's High Schools (now Titus Salt School) at Saltaire, Shipley, Yorkshire. Then he spent two years (1940–42) in the Royal Armoured Corps. In 1943 he was reappointed Art Master at Salt's High Schools, Shipley. Then in 1944 he was appointed lecturer and later senior lecturer at Cardiff School of Art (1944–73). He was a founder member of the "South Wales Group (Now known as "The Welsh Group")" (1949) and with David Tinker and Michael Edmonds he founded the "56 Group Wales" in 1956. Malthouse was an active member (1956-1970) of the 56 Group being chair (1961), publicity officer (!962-1963) and treasurer (1963-1965) until he resigned in 1970 along with John Selway and Ernest Zobole, apparently in protest at the desire of some constructivists to exhibit together. He was also a founder member of the Watercolour Society of Wales (now known as the Royal Watercolour Society of Wales) in 1959. In addition from 1959 he was an associate of the Royal West of England Academy. Up until 1955 he had been known as James Malthouse and used this name to sign his pictures. By 1956 he had largely stopped using his second forename and for the rest of his career he used his first forename being known as Eric Malthouse and signing his pictures with this name. He was elected to the Printmakers' Council in 1971 and in 1973 he retired from Cardiff School of Art moving to Cargreen in Cornwall where he continued his work with non-figurative oils and prints. In 1981 he moved to Keynsham. His wife Anne died in 1982 and in 1985 he moved back to Barry in South Wales where he continued to produce colourful abstracts and he also began a series of watercolours of scenes around Barry which he continued until he died in 1997.

== Art ==
Much of his early work was Figurative and his connection with Cornwall dates from the outbreak of the Second World War in 1939 when he was holidaying at Mullion in Cornwall. He moved to Cardiff in 1944 to take up a position at Cardiff School of Art, where he became established as a prominent Welsh artist. From 1952 to 1958 he produced his pigeon paintings transforming their movement to his canvas with pictures such as A Flight of Pigeons, A Flurry of Pigeons and Flying Pigeons. When he was back in Cornwall in 1955 he began, after a series of 'St. Ives Fishermen', paintings, the St. Ives 'Rock Pools' which were the foundation of his work as a non-figurative painter and showed the influence of Ceri Richards and Patrick Heron. By now his work was concerned with a close analysis of colour and spatial composition and by 1959 his paintings had become completely non-figurative. He painted murals for University Hall, Penylan, Cardiff and for the Wales Gas Board. Malthouse had been involved in printmaking since his school days at King Edward V1 School Aston where his art master showed him how to make a burin from an umbrella strut with which he made his first linocut. Printmaking became an increasingly important component of his future work. In 1968 Eric Malthouse and several other artists were commissioned by the Welsh Arts Council to design posters to be displayed on billboards throughout Wales. Malthouse's poster "Midsummer" (10 x 20 ft) was the first to be displayed outside Wales in Oxford. Of the six posters produced only those by Eric Malthouse, Jeffrey Steele and Allen Jones were said to have asserted themselves, with the Malthouse print being described as a "sensuous, map-like spread of large sinuous areas of warm dark colours" which enlivened the street in Cardiff where it was posted He produced illustrations for two books, Prynu Dol a collection of short stories by Kate Roberts and Ancestor Worship the first published collection of poems by Emyr Humphreys.
