= Arthur Giardelli =

Welsh painter (1911–2009)

- Born: Vincent Charles Arthur Giardelli; 11 April 1911; Stockwell, London, England
- Died: 2 November 2009 (aged 98); Haverfordwest, Pembrokeshire, Wales
- Education: Ruskin School of Art, Hertford College, Oxford
- Known for: Painting, assemblage
- Elected: The Welsh Group, 56 Group Wales

Vincent Charles Arthur Giardelli, MBE, (11 April 1911 – 2 November 2009) was a Welsh artist of Italian paternal descent.

== Early life and education ==
Vincent Charles Arthur Giardelli was born on 11 April 1911, his father of Italian descent, and was raised in Surrey.

He earned a degree in Modern Languages from Hertford College, Oxford.

He later trained at the Ruskin School of Art, Oxford, 1930–34.

== Career ==
Giardelli lived most of his life in Wales and was represented by the Grosvenor Gallery in London for a large part of his career. He was a friend of Welsh artists Cedric Morris, David Jones, Josef Herman, and Ceri Richards. He also had international artist friends including Zoran Mušič, Olivier Debré, and Fairfield Porter.

He was proactive in bringing art into south Wales communities. In the Second World War, Harvey Grammar School, Folkestone, where he taught, being evacuated, he became part of the Dowlais Educational Settlement Movement, and was influential in setting up the Rhondda Group. A Christian pacifist, influenced by Gandhi, he registered as a conscientious objector, leading to his dismissal as a teacher, even though he worked part-time in the National Fire Service.

In 1948 Arthur Giardelli was one of the founders of the South Wales Group (which later became The Welsh Group) and the 56 Group Wales, of which he became president towards the end of his life. He was also on the committee of the Contemporary Art Society for Wales and on the Welsh Arts Council.

He helped found the University Art Collection at Aberystwyth.

== Art ==
Giardelli first began to take his art seriously in the 1940s, when he arrived in Merthyr Tydfil, where he first met Cedric Morris and Heinz Koppel who both encouraged him. The town had an immediate impact on Giardelli; he once told poet Meic Stephens that "when the train finally pulled into Merthyr, I felt I'd come home".

Giardelli felt he had to constantly draw, paint and create and feared a world where his creative practice wasn't part of his life. He said "If I don't paint for a month, I may give it up for ever, so the constant challenge is that you must keep working. You must paint. You must draw. It's like speaking".

Giardelli used watercolours and found materials, including shells and driftwood. He was perhaps best known for his abstract relief constructions inspired by nature and the seasons. Conversely he was also inspired by Modernist artists including Piet Mondrian.

== Awards ==
- 1970: Winner, Visual Art prize at the National Eisteddfod of Wales
- 1973: MBE
- 1979: British Council Award winner
- 1979–85: Honorary Fellow at University College, Aberystwyth
- 1986: Silver Medal of the Czechoslovak Society for International Relations
- 2002 Cyfaill Celfyddyd Cymru (Friend of Welsh Art) medal from the National Eisteddfod of Wales.

== Collections ==
Giardelli's work is held in many collections, including the Tate, the National Museum of Wales, the National Library of Wales, Contemporary Art Society for Wales, Arts Council of Wales, Museum of Modern Art Wales, Brecknock Museum, Tenby Museum and Art Gallery together with museums and galleries in New York City, Dublin, Nantes, Bratislava, and Prague.

== Publications ==
- Arthur Giardelli: Paintings, Constructions, Relief Sculptures – Conversations with Derek Shiel, Seren, Bridgend 2001.

== Personal life and death ==
Giardelli died on 2 November 2009.
