= Tony Goble =

Welsh artist (1943–2007)

- Born: 20 October 1943
- Died: 13 April 2007 (aged 63)

Anthony Barton Goble (20 October 1943 – 13 April 2007) was a Welsh artist.

== Early life and education ==
Anthony Barton Goble was born on 20 October 1943 in Newtown, Montgomeryshire into a wealthy family. His father's death when he was a baby resulted in him spending his early years in the care of a Welsh-speaking family. He was later reunited with his mother and elder sisters, who had moved to Llandudno.

He was educated at St Mary's College, Rhos-on-Sea, and Wrexham College of Art.

== Career ==
Goble became a member of the Royal Cambrian Academy in 1977, before taking on a residency at Llanover Hall arts centre in Cardiff in 1979. His work has been exhibited at the Royal Academy of Arts and the National Portrait Gallery, London as well as a 25-year retrospective at Llanover Hall in 2004.

== Collections ==
Works by Goble are exhibited in the collections at the National Museum of Wales, Leeds Museum, the Glynn Vivian Art Gallery and the Contemporary Art Society for Wales.

== Solo exhibitions ==
- "Dream-Seeds", Glynn Vivian Art Gallery, Swansea, 1995
- "25 Years in Residence", Llanover Hall, 2004

== Personal life ==
Goble married in 1963 and settled at Llanfairfechan. He worked at several jobs to support his family while trying to make his name as an artist.

He died on 13 April 2007.
