= Will Roberts =

Welsh painter (1907–2000)

William Roberts
- Born: 21 December 1907 in Ruabon, Denbighshire, Wales
- Died: 11 March 2000 (aged 92); Neath, Wales
- Known for: Painting, drawing

Will Roberts (21 December 1907 – 11 March 2000) was a Welsh expressionist painter.

== Biography ==
Roberts was born in Ruabon, Denbighshire, the son of a railwayman of the Great Western Railway. The family moved to Neath in Glamorgan in 1918. His gift for drawing was apparent from early on and, as a part-time student for four years from 1928, Roberts took classes at Swansea Art School under William Grant Murray. In 1945, he met the Polish artist Josef Herman. At that time, Herman was living in the neighbouring town of Ystradgynlais. They shared an appreciation of Expressionism and often painted together. Later, Roberts was to acknowledge Herman's influence on his work.

Roberts found inspiration in the local community, painting industrial workers and farmers, and domestic scenes of family life. Some of Roberts' most striking works are of Welsh landscapes and he is now widely acknowledged as one of Wales's modern masters. In 1962, Roberts won the Byng-Stamper Prize for landscape painting, judged by Sir Kenneth Clark, for Farm at Cimla which was acquired by the National Museum of Wales. In 1992, he was awarded an honorary Fellowship by University College, Swansea, and in 1994 a retrospective exhibition of his work was the centrepiece of the arts exhibit at the National Eisteddfod of Wales. In 1998, the National Library of Wales accepted a donation of 600 drawings from Roberts.

He was one of the original members of the arts group 56 Group Wales, which set out to raise the profile of modern Welsh art.

Roberts died in Neath, where his 24 charcoal drawings of the Stations of the Cross may be seen in St David's Church. Another of his works, The Three Magi, is on the choir vestry wall. A memorial exhibition of drawings and some paintings was shown at the National Library of Wales in 2001.

== Bibliography ==
- "Will Roberts – A Retrospective 1927–1992", (Oriel Mostyn Llandudno, 1993) ISBN 0-906860-24-5
- Joyner, P: "Will Roberts RCA Drawings", (National Library of Wales, 2001) ISBN 1-86225-025-1
