= Rob Piercy =

British artist (born 1946)

Rob Piercy is an artist and painter (born 1946). Born in Porthmadog, he was also an art teacher at Ysgol Eifionydd, Porthmadog for 15 years, before leaving to concentrate on painting in 1989. He has his own gallery in Porthmadog, which he established in 1986. His main subjects for his works are landscapes and beaches in his local area, especially the landscape of Snowdonia. An experienced mountaineer, he is a member of the Alpine Club of Great Britain.

He is a member of the Royal Cambrian Academy of Art and the Watercolour Society of Wales.

He was shortlisted for the Garrick/Milne Prize in 2000. Piercy won the Welsh Artist of the Year award in 2002 with a non-landscape painting called "Y Dawnswyr (The Dancers)", inspired by his son Robyn's school drama group.

In 2006 Piercy was featured in an episode of the Welsh language television series, Byd o Liw.

== Bibliography ==
- Mynyddoedd Eryri / The Snowdonia Collection, October 2008, ISBN 978-1-84527-183-1 (Gwasg Carreg Gwalch)
