= Ernest Zobole =

Welsh painter and art teacher (1927–1999)

- Born: 25 April 1927; Ystrad, Rhondda, Wales, UK
- Died: 27 November 1999 (aged 72); Ystrad, Rhondda, Wales
- Education: Cardiff College of Art
- Occupations: Painter, art teacher
- Years active: c. 1950–1999
- Known for: Industrial landscapes of the Rhondda Valleys, member of the Rhondda Group
- Notable work: People and Ystrad Rhondda (1961), Some Trees and Snow (1978)
- Style: Expressionism, impasto technique
- Movement: Rhondda Group, 56 Group Wales
- Awards: Honorary Fellow of the University of Wales, Swansea (1996)

Ernest Zobole (25 April 1927 – 27 November 1999) was a Welsh painter and art teacher. Born to Italian immigrant parents in Ystrad, Rhondda, he is known for paintings of the industrial Rhondda Valleys. Zobole was a founding member of the Rhondda Group and the 56 Group Wales. After military service and a teaching career that included positions across Wales, he spent most of his life in his birthplace of Ystrad.

== Early life and education ==
Ernest Zobole was born in the village of Ystrad, Rhondda, Wales, on 25 April 1927, to Italian immigrants who had moved to Wales in 1910. His father worked at the local pit doing surface work, whilst his mother kept a small shop. He was educated at Porth Grammar School, before spending five years training at the Cardiff College of Art from 1948 to 1953.

His time at Cardiff College was notable for the daily commute from the Valleys to Cardiff, as it was used as an opportunity for Zobole and five fellow students to discuss and critique their art work. The group was taught by Joan Baker, who taught at Cardiff for nearly 40 years and was deeply concerned with depicting urban life.

Although the six artists - Zobole, Charles Burton, Glyn Morgan, Nigel Flower, David Mainwaring and Robert Thomas - never set up a school or published a manifesto, they became known as the Rhondda Group and were an important movement in South Wales art.

== As an artist ==
As a student in 1952, Zobole became acquainted with Heinz Koppel, the German expressionist refugee artist who had a studio in Dowlais. Influences on his work included Marc Chagall and Koppel, and like these two artists Zobole brought an often intense personal vision to his work. What particularly impressed Zobole about Koppel's work was that it was "all to do with paint" and worked exclusively through the medium of "paint language". Zobole admired artists who, like him, "weren't imprisoned by perspective", specifically mentioning Marc Chagall, Ceri Richards, Stanley Spencer and the early Italian Masters.

Initially Zobole painted as he had been taught at college, but by 1960 he started to experiment with his own style. Art historian David Fraser Jenkins described Zobole's commitment to the Rhondda as "a total identification, going beyond a supply of subjects". He originally painted oil on canvas, but then switched to oil on board and started to use monochrome colours. He began using impasto, mainly applied with a palette knife. His period of work during the mid-1960s are now regarded as the most daring phase of his career.

Critics have applied the term "Magic Realism" to Zobole's work, noting how he transforms the Rhondda landscape, presenting viewers with spaces to explore. His work during this period included key paintings such as the semi-abstract Black Valley (1962-63).

From 1963 to 1984 he became a painting lecturer at Newport Art School. During this period, as the syllabus put more emphasis on conceptual art, video performance and photography, he expressed regret that "painting had come to an end, or at least it was relegated to a low position". Amongst his and John Selway's students at Newport was Ken Elias (b. 1944), whose painting Days are where we live (1968-69) was inspired by Zobole's work and a Philip Larkin poem.

Art historian Ceri Thomas, who completed a doctorate on Zobole and authored the definitive biography Ernest Zobole: A Life in Art (2007), has described the artist as "a major figure in Welsh painting". The University of South Wales holds over one hundred paintings and numerous works on paper by Zobole, representing "the single largest and most representative body of his work".

Zobole showed in many group exhibitions, including Howard Roberts Gallery in Cardiff, Dillwyn Gallery in Swansea, South Wales Group, Welsh Arts Council, and the Royal National Eisteddfod. He was included in the Welsh Arts Council's significant 1981 landscape exhibition The Dark Hills The Heavy Clouds, which featured seven major Welsh landscape painters including Josef Herman and Kyffin Williams.

Solo exhibitions included Newport Museum & Art Gallery (1986), Ceri Richards Gallery at the University College of Wales, Swansea (1989), and Martin Tinney Gallery in Cardiff (1994 and 1997). In 2002, there was an exhibition of work by Zobole and the sculptor Robert Thomas at the University of Glamorgan, Pontypridd. This was followed in 2004 by a retrospective at Newport Museum and Art Gallery. A retrospective exhibition was also curated by Ceri Thomas at the University of South Wales and the National Library of Wales in 2009-10.

The National Museum of Wales holds ten pieces of work by Zobole, whilst other institutions including the Welsh Arts Council, Contemporary Art Society for Wales, and Rhondda Heritage Park also hold examples of his work.

== Later life and death ==
Following his retirement from Newport Art School in 1984, Zobole continued to paint prolifically, producing some of his most reflective and accomplished works. During the 1980s and 1990s, his paintings increasingly explored the relationship between interior and exterior spaces, with works such as Interior No. 3 (1985-86) described as "deeply personal but also outward-looking".

His later period saw continued experimentation with perspective and viewpoint, exemplified by the Painter and Surroundings series begun in 1991, in which "the hills are reflected in windows and mirrors; they are broken, refracted, complicated". Art critic Meic Stephens observed of these late works: "it is as if he is trying to make contact with everything – the moon, the hills, the wet road, the street-lamps, the houses".

One of Zobole's most significant late works was A Painting about Myself in a Landscape (1994-95), which the curator of the University of South Wales collection described as showing "the ageing, all-seeing artist in an abstracted, map-like representation of his Rhondda landscape at night". This work demonstrates how, even in his final years, Zobole continued to develop his distinctive visual language whilst remaining devoted to his birthplace.

In 1996, he was made an Honorary Fellow of the University of Wales, Swansea, recognising his contribution to Welsh art and culture. Despite opportunities to live and work elsewhere, Zobole remained deeply connected to Ystrd throughout his life. Save for brief periods teaching elsewhere, he spent most of his life in his birthplace, which art historian David Fraser Jenkins described as "a total identification, going beyond a supply of subjects".

He died on 27 November 1999 in Llwynypia, Rhondda Cynon Taff, having continued to paint until near the end of his life.

His fifty-year career spanned the period from about 1948 to 1999, leaving behind what is considered "the single largest and most representative body" of work by a major Welsh artist of the post-war period.

== Bibliography ==
- Thomas, Ceri (2007). Ernest Zobole: A Life in Art. Denbigh: Seren. ISBN 978-1-85411-372-6.
- Wakelin, Peter (23 December 1999). "Ernest Zobole (obituary)". London.
