= Ezzelina Jones =

Welsh artist and sculptor

- Born: Ezzelina Gwenhwyfar Williams; 28 June 1921; Pontarddulais, Wales
- Died: 7 November 2012 (aged 91); Llanelli, Wales
- Other names: Gwen Jones
- Occupation: Sculptor
- Known for: Sculpture
- Spouse: Elias Llewelyn Jones
- Children: Two

Ezzelina Jones born Ezzelina Gwenhwyfar Williams aka Gwen Jones (28 June 1921 – 7 November 2012) was a Welsh artist and sculptor.

== Life ==
Jones was born in Pontarddulais near Swansea. Her parents both had the last name of Williams, Godfrey Hugh Beddoe Williams and Elizabeth Mary Williams. They gave her the name of Ezzelina as one of her fathers co-workers had lost his daughter of that name a couple of years before she was born. However the name they used was Gwen or Gwenhwyfar. Her mother died when she was a child. She left the local school at fourteen and she worked locally and in London before she married a local man named Elias Llewelyn Jones. At nineteen she was bringing up a child alone as Elias was serving in Africa as a flight sergeant during the Second World War. After the war he worked in the local tin works as her father had also done, until his promotion took the family to Llanelli where they had a second child.

When she was about 45 she discovered wood carving and an evening course to learn more. Her interest went from wood to paint until a teacher spotted her ability with 3D work and she discovered clay as a medium. She went back to work for six months so she could have her own kiln and she turned down an offer of becoming a mature student so she could concentrate on sculpture. Things changed and she destroyed many of her paintings as she renamed herself Ezzelina and focussed on sculpture. Society too was changing and the tin works closed, but she would still use their workers as inspiration.

She exhibited her work and in 1977 the Llanelli Art Society awarded her their Emlyn Roberts Award. In 1983 she completed a commission to create bronze bust of a collier for the Welsh Miners Museum in the Afan Valley. Her work was included in galleries in Bristol and Manchester.

In 1994 she had an exhibition at the arts museum, Cyfarthfa Castle, in Merthyr Tydfil and in the following year two others at Rhondda Heritage Park and at Saint David's Hall in Cardiff. She made a sculpture of an Onion Johnny like the ones she had remembered from her local market and seeing them selling onions on bicycles. She chose to model Marie le Goff and this was exhibited in a museum in Roscoff. Her last dedicated exhibition was in 1996 at the Glynn Vivian Museum in Swansea. She died in 2012 at Ty Mair Nursing Home in Llanelli.

In 2017 a talk was given at the National Library of Wales about Jones and Elizabeth Vera Bassett because they had both been born in Pontarddulais and established a wider reputation but they were not too valued in Wales.
