= Peter Prendergast (artist) =

British artist (1946–2007)

- Born: 27 October 1946; Abertridwr, Caerphilly, Wales
- Died: 14 January 2007 (aged 60); Deiniolen, Gwynedd, Wales
- Education: Cardiff School of Art; Slade School of Fine Art; Reading University
- Known for: Painting
- Spouse: Lesley Riding (m. 1967)
- Website: www.peterprendergast.co.uk

Peter Prendergast (27 October 1946 – 14 January 2007) was a Welsh landscape painter.

== Early life and education ==
Peter Prendergast was born on 27 October 1946 in Abertridwr, a mining village in the Aber Valley near Caerphilly in Wales. His father was a Roman Catholic from County Wexford, Ireland, who sought work as a coal miner in Maesteg in south Wales after the 1916 Easter Rising; Prendergast described himself as "half Welsh, half Irish".

His older brother (Stewart) and his twin (Paul) attended the local grammar school, but he was sent to the local secondary modern, where his art teacher, Gomer Lewis, recognised his artistic talent. With support from the County art adviser, Leslie Moore, he won a County art scholarship to study at the Cardiff School of Art in 1962, despite having no formal academic qualifications.

Prendergast moved to the Slade School of Fine Art in 1964, where he studied under Sir William Coldstream, Francis Bacon, and Euan Uglow. His tutor was Frank Auerbach. He won the Nettleship Prize for Figure Painting in 1967. He met his future wife, Lesley Riding, in his last year at the Slade, and they were married in 1967.

== Career ==
Prendergast taught part-time in a school for one year after leaving the Slade, and then studied for a Master's degree at Reading University with Terry Frost and Claude Rogers. There, he met Len Tabner, a fellow student and landscape painter, who remained a close friend in later life.

Prendergast and his wife moved to Bethesda in 1969, a village near Bangor and close to the Penrhyn Quarry. He taught part-time at Liverpool School of Art until 1974, then at a local school, Ysgol Dyffryn Ogwen, and then at Coleg Menai, but he concentrated more on developing as an artist. He specialised in paintings of the Penrhyn slate quarry, which he described as "the biggest man-made hole in Europe, like Bruegel's The Tower of Babel, but in reverse", and of Snowdonia. His early works have an Expressionist style, almost Cubist. He painted similar views from skyscrapers in Manhattan on a visit to New York City in 1993.

Prendergast won prizes at the National Eisteddfod in 1975 and 1977. Examples of his paintings are owned by the Contemporary Art Society for Wales and the Tate. For some years his work was shown by Agnew's gallery in London, culminating in a touring exhibition; the foreword to the exhibition catalogue was written by Sister Wendy Beckett, who described him as "a superb colourist and a master of form".

He was a member of 56 Group Wales from 1982 until his death.

A "50th Birthday Exhibition" was held at the Boundary Gallery in London in 1996, and a retrospective of his works toured galleries in Wales in 2006, including the Welsh Museum of Modern Art in Machynlleth. The Painter's Quarry, a collection of critical essays on his work, was also published in 2006; a television profile with the same title appeared on BBC2.

After suffering from poor health in 2006, he died suddenly on 14 January 2007 from a heart attack while walking with his wife near his home in Deiniolen, near Caernarfon in Gwynedd.

Following his death he had two major tribute exhibitions at Martin Tinney Gallery, Cardiff (2014) and Oriel Tegfryn, Menai Bridge (2013). In 2013 Richard Cork's biography of the artist, The Art of Peter Pendergast, was published by Lund Humphries, with an introductory essay by Prendergast's old friend, Mike Knowles.
