= Mary Lloyd Jones =

Welsh artist (born 1934)

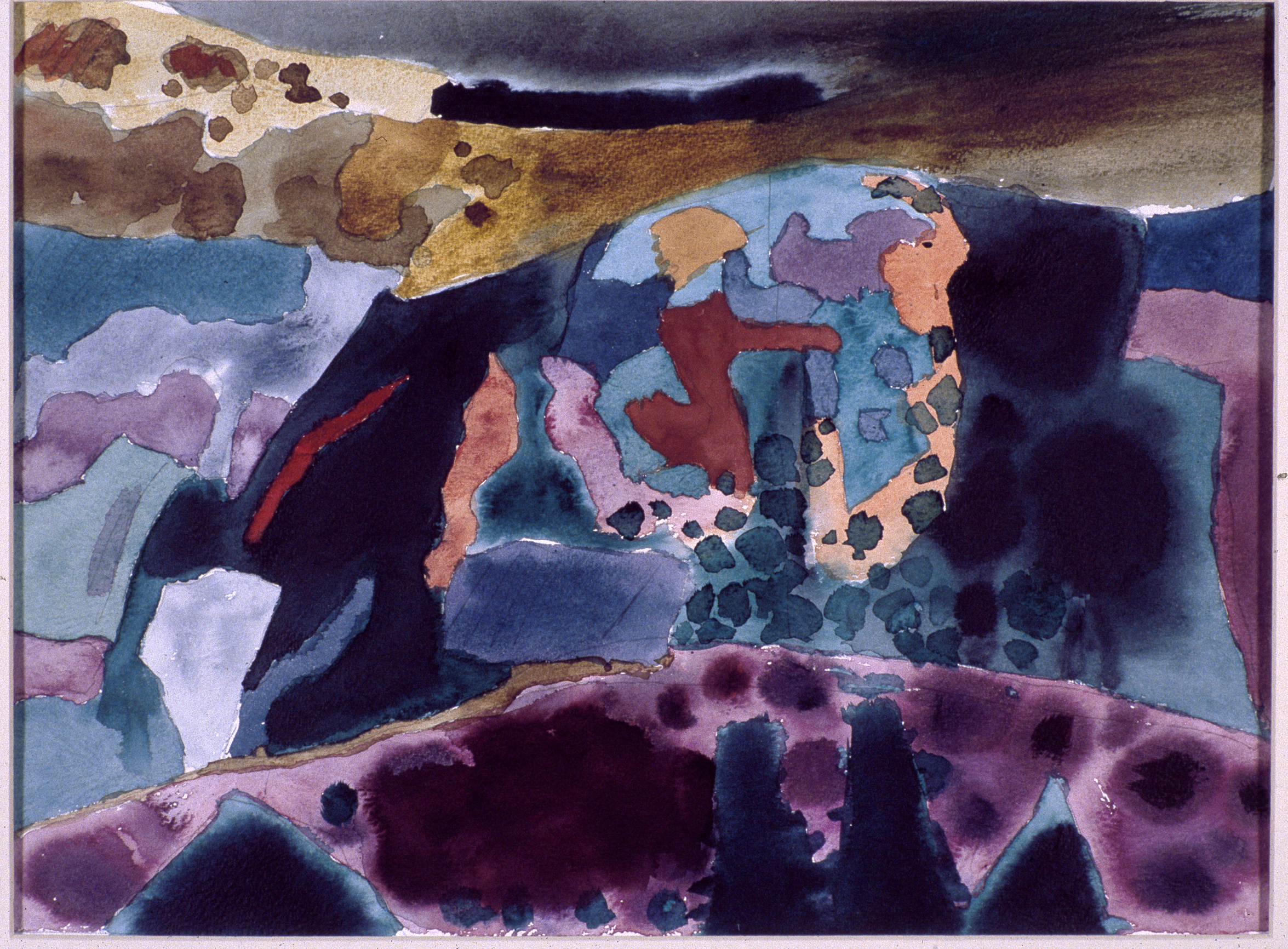
- Cwm Rheidol
- Born: August 1934 (age 91); Devils Bridge, Cardiganshire
- Education: Cardiff School of Art, Cardiff
- Known for: Painting and printmaking
- Website: marylloydjones.co.uk

Mary Lloyd Jones FLSW (born August 1934) is a Welsh painter and printmaker based in Aberystwyth. Her works are multilayered and use devices that reflect an interest in the beginnings of language, including early man-made marks and the ogham and bardic alphabets. She has exhibited across Wales and internationally.

== Work ==
Lloyd Jones was born in Devil's Bridge, Cardiganshire (now Ceredigion) and attended art school immediately upon leaving school. Her ambition was always to be an artist. However, she did not begin to exhibit work publicly until 1966, when she was in her early 30s. Ceridwen Lloyd Morgan attributes this relatively late flowering to the fact that she was a Welsh woman from a rural background. As Lloyd Jones has stated: "At times I felt that I belonged to the wrong sex and was living in the wrong time and place to be a successful artist." In 1989 she gave up her job as visual arts officer for the county of Dyfed to become a full-time artist. From this point her work evolved to take the form of large, irregularly shaped paintings which were unstretched. Such works were associated with cloth, stitching and dye-soaking into the cloth. Later she returned to more traditional forms of painting, as well as producing proclamatory banners.

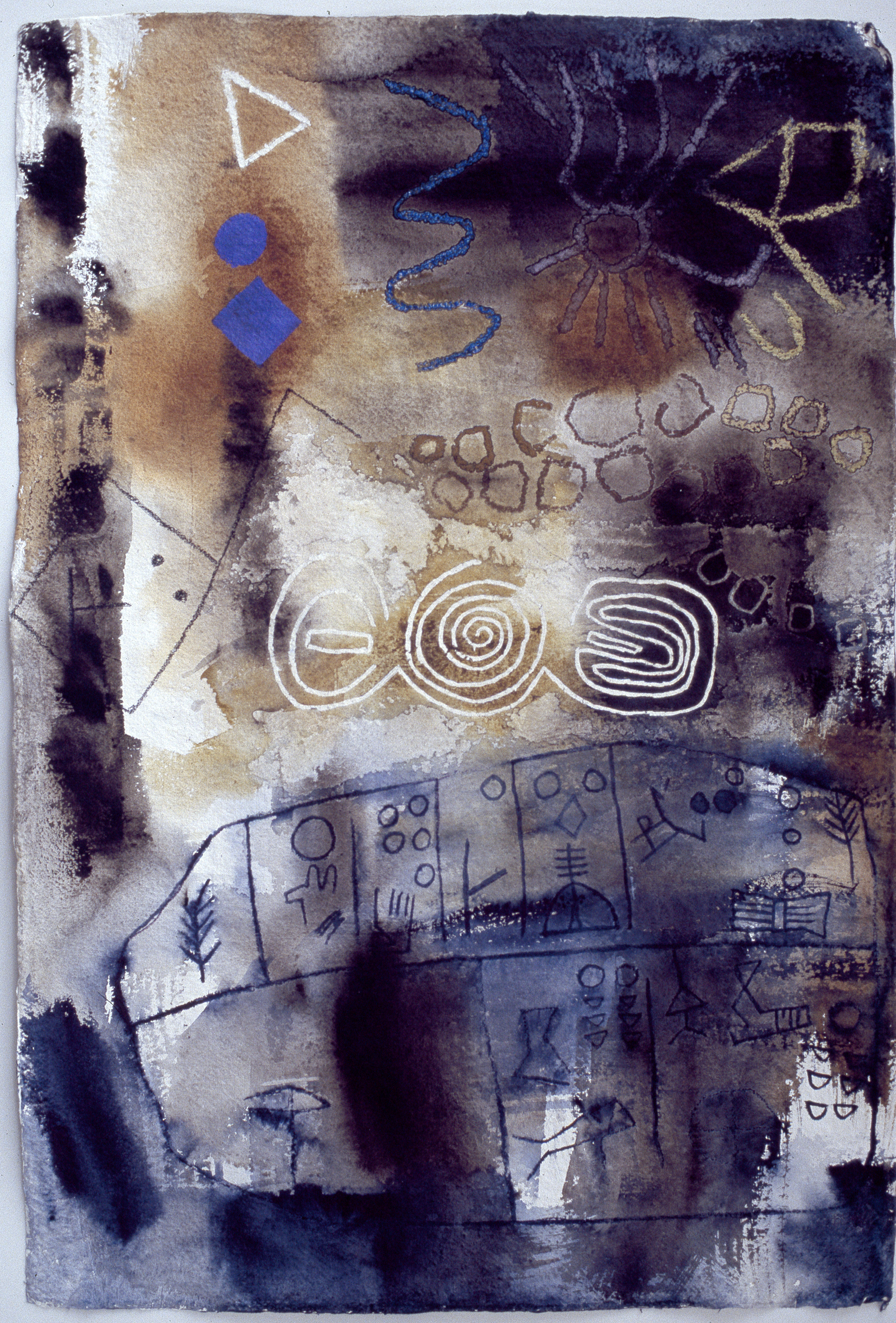
Lost Language

Lloyd Jones's work is greatly inspired by the landscape in which she grew up, a prominent feature of which is the scarred landscape associated with a legacy of lead mining. This sense of place is further augmented by her own Welsh-language cultural inheritance. Ann Price-Owen has referred to her work as that of a custodian of her cultural heritage, which is implicitly language-based. Experiences outside Wales have also provided key stages in her work's development. An interest in early alphabets was precipitated by a visit to Ilkley Moor to view cup and ring marks. Incorporation of such marks into the work led to an identification with the 18th-century Welsh bard, scholar and antiquarian Iolo Morganwg, who created his own bardic alphabet, "Coelbren". She regards the use of scripts such as the ancient ogham script in her work as an oblique reference to the otherness of Welshness. Iwan Bala argues that these works demand some form of contextualising, revealing the artist's concerns and her position within her own culture. In summer 2009 Ruthin Craft Centre showed Lloyd Jones's early textile work, which led to a re-evaluation of this work by a new audience. A second show in 2013 was reviewed in the magazine Embroidery. In February 2013 she was awarded the first Artist Residency at the Old College, Aberystwyth University, and moved into a new studio there. Some of her paintings are in the public collections of the National Library of Wales, Amgueddfa Cymru – Museum Wales and Cardiff University.

Lloyd Jones joined the 56 Group Wales as an associate member in 1971, and was a full member from 1973 to 1986.

In October 2014 she published her autobiography, No Mod Cons, an account both of her struggles to paint and of her attempts to organise a better world for Welsh artists.

In 2016, she was elected a Fellow of the Learned Society of Wales.

Following discussions with her family, in October 2025 Lloyd Jones donated 150 of her works to the National Library of Wales, including works from her childhood in the 1920s and 30s and some of her early landscapes from the 1960s.

== Solo exhibitions ==
- 2004 – 'The Colour of Saying', Oriel Theatr Clwyd
- 2004 – 'The Colour of Saying', Llantarnam Grange, Cwmbran
- 2005 – New work, Martin Tinney Gallery, Cardiff
- 2006 – 'First Language', Gregynog Gallery, National Library of Wales
- 2009 – 'Cloth works', Ruthin Centre for Applied Arts
- 2013 – 'Signs of Life, Ruthin Craft Centre
- 2014 – 'A Journey from Devils Bridge', Gallery 1, Canolfan Y Celfyddydau Aberystwyth Arts Centre

== Residencies ==
Listed by Martin Tinney Gallery unless otherwise stated.

- 1988 Residency, Tyrone Guthrie Centre, Ireland
- 1990 Studio Exchange to Philadelphia USA
- 1993 'Cwlwm Celtaidd / Ceangal Ceilteach'. Three-month exchange residency. Highland regional council / West Wales Arts
- 1995 Guest Tutor, Rajasthan, India
- 1997 Progetto Galles Celtico, Adria, Italy
- 1997 Green Mountain College, Vermont, United States
- 1998 Cywaith Cymru, National Eisteddfod, Bro Ogwr. Installation and collaboration on Iolo Morganwg
- 1999 Centre D'Art I Natura, Farerra de Pallars, Catalonia, Spain.

== Books by Mary Lloyd Jones ==
- First Language (2006), Gwasg Gomer, Llandysul, ISBN 1-84323-540-4
- All the Colours of Light (2009), Pont Books, Llandysul, ISBN 1-84323-833-0
- No Mod Cons (2014), Llygad Gwalch Cyf., ISBN 1-84524-228-9
