= Phil Nicol =

Welsh painter (born 1953)

Philip Nicol (born in 1953, Caerphilly, Wales) is a Welsh painter.

Nicol graduated from Cardiff College of Art. He has been a lecturer at the Cardiff School and at Limerick Art College, Éire.

His paintings often portray twilight inner city landscapes.

He was the winner of the gold medal for Fine Art at the National Eisteddfod of Wales in 2001.

Nicol was a member of the 56 Group Wales from 1984 to 1991. He is exhibition director at the BayArt gallery, Cardiff Bay.

His paintings are in the public collections of the National Museum of Wales, Newport Art Gallery and the National Assembly for Wales.
