= Martyn Jones (painter) =

British contemporary painter (born 1955)

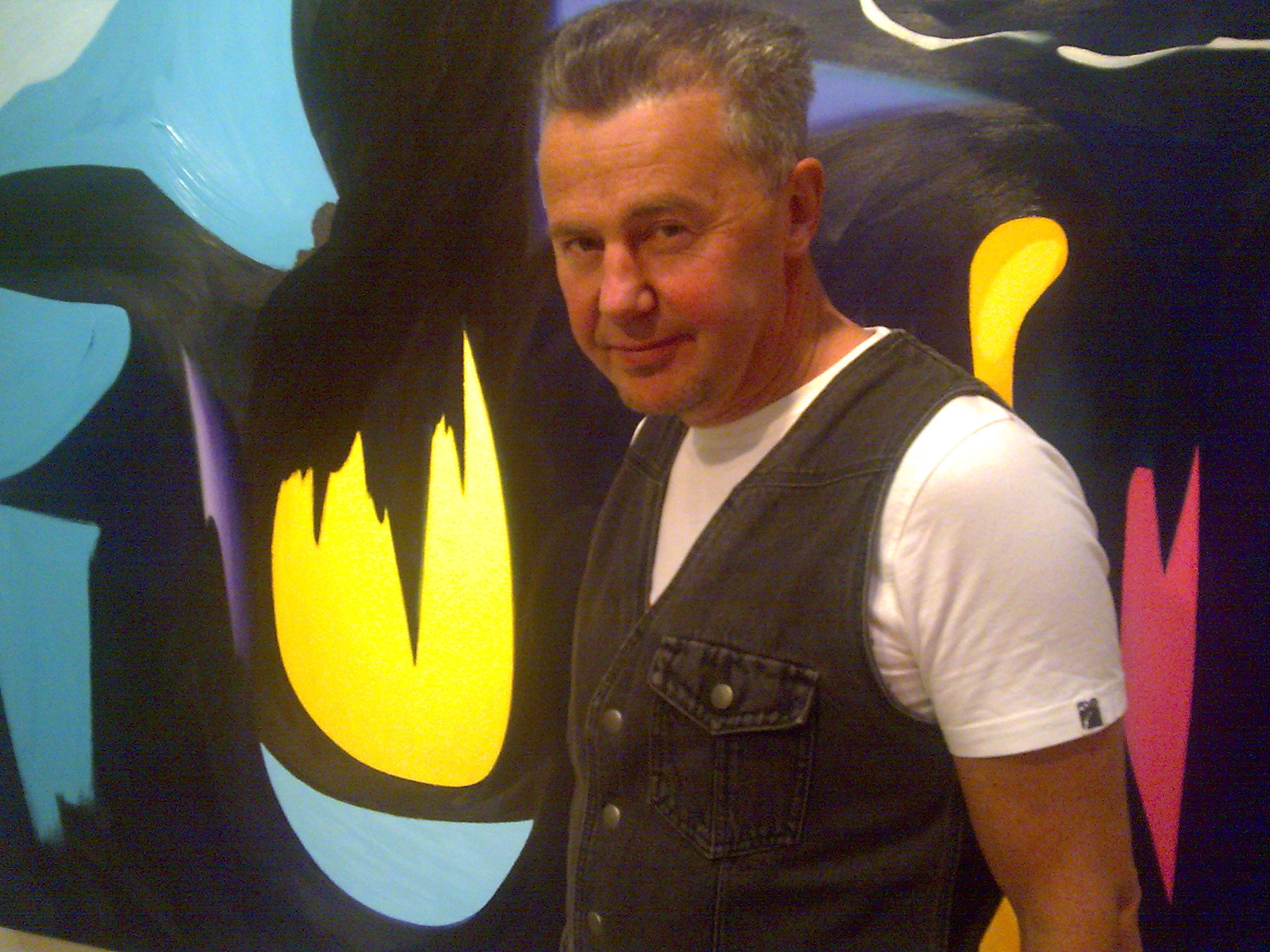
- Jones in his studio, 2009
- Born: 1955 (age 70–71); Aberdare, Wales
- Education: Chelsea School of Art; Bath Academy of Art
- Known for: Painting

Martyn Jones (born 1955) is a British contemporary painter who works from his studio in Cardiff, Wales.

== Biography ==
Jones, who was born in Aberaman, near Aberdare in Rhondda Cynon Taf, graduated with an M.A. in Fine Art from Chelsea School of Art, London and was awarded Junior Fellowship at Bath Academy of Art. Among his tutors were the British artists Adrian Heath and Patrick Heron. His work is represented in the UK by the Ffin-y-Parc Gallery and Kooywood Gallery, Wales and the No. 9 Gallery in Birmingham, and in USA by Artefact Pardo Gallery, Miami and the Robert Steele Gallery, New York.

Jones was publicity officer for the 56 Group Wales from 1996 to 2000.

During 2008 Jones staged his first major international solo exhibition "Overland" at the Robert Steele Gallery, Chelsea, Manhattan, comprising over forty works. The Robert Steele Gallery has represented Jones' work, since 2004, in a variety of international and themed group exhibitions. In March 2010 Jones exhibited his second solo-show at the Robert Steele Gallery,

During 2012 Jones exhibited in three solo-shows, at Artefact Pardo Gallery in Palm Beach County, Florida, at the Oriel Ynys Mon Gallery in Anglesey and at the Kooywood Gallery in Cardiff.

Jones' work has been exhibited widely in UK, Europe and USA, including at the National Museums and Galleries of Wales, at the Wales International Centre and the Chrysler Building in New York City.

== Artwork ==
His work is represented in numerous public and private collections in Europe and the US He is represented by the Kooywood Gallery, Cardiff and by the Robert Steele Gallery, New York City.

Jones describes his own work as:

My work is descriptive in essence – natural shape and form taken from the world at large. My paintings have been described as capturing a natural ambiguity, but that ambiguity should not be construed as being manufactured in any way. Within each image an open invitation is challengingly presented to the percipient. It is difficult to determine when a painting is finished, but usually I instinctively know when that moment has arrived. I can say more often than not, my paintings finish themselves.

— Martyn Jones

== Exhibitions ==
Selected solo exhibitions

- 2008 Overland, Robert Steele Gallery, New York
- 2009 Kooywood Gallery, Cardiff
- 2010 Off the Wall Contemporary Art, Cardiff, Wales
- 2010 Atelier, Robert Steele Gallery, New York
- 2011 Off the Wall Gallery, Cardiff, Wales
- 2012 Kooywood Gallery, Cardiff, Wales
- 2012 Oriel Ynys Mon, Anglesey, North Wales
- 2012 Artefact Pardo Gallery, West Palm Beach, Florida
- 2013 Ffin-y-Parc Gallery, Wales
- 2014 Kooywood Gallery, Cardiff, Wales
- 2015 Artefact Pardo Gallery, Florida
- 2015 Ffin-y-Parc Gallery, Wales
- 2017 Ffin-y-Parc Gallery, Wales
- 2018 Heath Gallery, Palm Springs, California

Selected group exhibitions

- 2006 on the Horizon, Robert Steele Gallery, New York City
- 2007 Attic Gallery, Swansea, Wales
- 2007 West Wales Arts Centre, Fishguard, Wales
- 2007 Kooywood Gallery, Cardiff, Wales
- 2007 Chelsea Summer Dreaming, Robert Steele Gallery, New York City
- 2008 56 Group Wales, Tenby Museum, Oriel Myrddin, Wales
- 2008 International Artists Summer Show, Robert Steele Gallery, New York City
- 2008 Ffres Ysbryd/Spirit Wales Newport Museum and Gallery, Wales
- 2009 International Artexpo, Jacob Javits Center, New York City
- 2009 National Eisteddfod, Bala, Wales
- 2009 Robert Steele Gallery, New York City
- 2009 Summer in Suite 402, Robert Steele Gallery, New York City
- 2010 Cowbridge Gallery, Wales
- 2010 Blackheath Gallery, London, England
- 2011 'Etcetera – 4 Contemporary Painters', Oxmarket Centre of Arts, Chichester, West Sussex, England
- 2011 'ArtAt' Arts Festival, Pembrokeshire, Wales
- 2011 'Jones/Melero' Espacio 1440 Biscayne Blvd., Miami

== Collections ==
- Ashby Media, New York City.
- Harlem Homes, New York.
- Feederle-Schlaffer, Zurich, Switzerland.
- Allied Irish Banks, Wales.
- Cynon Valley Museum and Gallery, Wales.
- University of Dallas, Texas.
- University of Glamorgan, Wales.
- Contemporary Art Society, London.
- Wales International Center, New York.
- Mosaic Information Solutions Ltd., Aberdeen, Scotland.
