= Contemporary Art Society for Wales =

Welsh charity supporting contemporary art

The Contemporary Art Society for Wales (CASW) is a charity that supports contemporary visual art in Wales, United Kingdom.

== History ==
The Contemporary Art Society for Wales (CASW) was founded in 1937. The first purchaser appointed by the society was the English painter and director of the Tate, J. B. Manson, who secured a "true masterpiece" by Gwen John, Girl in Profile, for £100. Other paintings acquired by CASW in the early days were by Polish refugee and Swansea resident expressionist painter Josef Herman, writer and painter Brenda Chamberlain, and Ceri Richards.

In the 1960s, works by Terry Setch, Jeffrey Steele, and sculptor David Nash were all purchased at a reasonable price.

Since 1938, CASW has been acquiring the artworks of Welsh contemporary artists and donating them to museums, galleries, and public institutions. By 1995, it had collected 700 works; by 2019, there were 900.

== Aims and description ==
The aims of the Contemporary Art Society for Wales are modelled on its English predecessor, the Contemporary Art Society. Its main object is "the promotion and appreciation of the arts among the people of Wales".

CASW appoints a new buyer each year, who is given free rein in the selection of which works to purchase. All of the works purchased by the society are allocated to various Welsh museums and art galleries.

== Award ==
Since around 2005, CASW has been awarding various prizes for students, including the CASW Student Award for a postgraduate student studying in Wales and the CASW National Eisteddfod Purchase Prize. In 2024, CASW introduced a new award, aimed at younger and emerging artists in Wales, called the Hibbard Prize.

== Exhibitions and locations ==
Among the institutions to which works have been allocated by CASW is Cyfarthfa Castle, in Merthyr Tydfil. Their holdings include Arthur Giardelli's 1964 abstract relief Pembrokeshire Panel and Ray Howard-Jones's South Haven.

On 4 August 2018, an exhibition celebrating 80 years of collection was launched at the National Eisteddfod of Wales in Cardiff, followed by a tour of the works until May 2019.

== Other works ==
Aside from those mentioned above, also included in the CASW collection are works by David Jones, Augustus John, Thomas Rathmell, Evan Charlton, Kyffin Williams, and Bert Isaac.
