= Dan Rees (artist) =

Dan Rees (born 1982) is a Welsh artist, a photographer, sculptor and painter. He was born in Swansea and relocated to Germany in 2005. He attended Camberwell College of Art and Städelschule, from which he graduated in 2009.

Dan Rees has exhibited group and solo internationally. His 2008 solo show of photographs 'Three Works in September', at the Parade Gallery, London, was initially discussed over a game of table tennis.

In 2013, Complex magazine numbered him among their "25 artists to watch in 2013".
