= 56 Group Wales =

Welsh artists organization

- Formation: 1956
- Type: Visual arts
- Location: Wales
- Website: www.56groupwales.org.uk

The 56 Group Wales (Welsh: Grŵp 56 Cymru) is an artists' organisation founded in Wales in 1956, with the aim of promoting Welsh Modernist art and artists. The name was originally simply the 56 Group: "Wales" was added in 1967, in response to a feeling that the organisation's "Welsh origins ought to be re-affirmed". The Welsh-language version of the name was first used on publicity in 1976.

== Formation ==
The post-war art establishment in Wales was still very conservative and moves had been afoot since the late 1930s to create a modern art group. In March 1956, following a failed attempt to become a South Wales Academy of Art, a "rebellion" took place within the ranks of the South Wales Group and the 56 Group was established. Artists Eric Malthouse, David Tinker and Michael Edmonds were the leading instigators. They circulated a statement of purpose and aims and an invitation to join the group to ten leading Welsh artists.

That painters and sculptors believe in a positive and dynamic approach which is aware of the tradition of the past and its fulfilment in the Art of the present.

That the first aims of painting and sculpture lie in the integration of design and emotion; the search for a powerful image that transcends the everyday world around us.

That the effect of environment is deeper and more all-embracing than the fortuitous mimicry of everyday surroundings. The painter and sculptor consciously seek a place to work where he feels at home.

— Eric Malthouse, David Tinker and Michael Edmonds, The 56 Group: statement of purpose, 1956

Of those invited to join, nine accepted: Trevor Bates, Hubert Dalwood, George Fairley, Arthur Giardelli, Robert Hunter, Heinz Koppel, Will Roberts, John Wright and Ernest Zobole. Brenda Chamberlain, the only female artist invited, declined.

Although all 12 of the founder-members worked in a broadly modernist and internationalist idiom, they did not share a recognisably common style or ideology. Their average age was 36; and ten worked as art lecturers (Roberts and Edmonds did not). Only two, Roberts and Zobole, had been born in Wales: Fairley was born in Scotland, Koppel in Germany and the others in England.

== Group chair ==
Painter, sculptor and teacher Arthur Giardelli was the chair of the Group from 1961 to 1998. Some of its success – exhibitions and tours outside Wales – have been attributed to his language skills and European outlook.

== Activities ==
The 56 Group has always been essentially an exhibiting association of artists who retain their own independence and individuality.

The group's first exhibition was held at Worcester Museum and Art Gallery in June 1957, and versions of the same exhibition were held later the same year at the National Museum of Wales and Tenby Civic Centre.

It subsequently exhibited widely in both Wales and England. Its first continental exhibition was held in Amsterdam in 1967, and later exhibitions went to Nantes in 1974–5, Bologna in 1983, Czechoslovakia in 1986–7 and again in 1991, and Libramont, Belgium, in 1994. An exhibition of modern Welsh art held at the Jefferson Place Gallery, Washington, D.C., in 1965, although not formally associated with the Group, included work by several of its members.

By 2012, the Group's 56th anniversary year, it could claim to have had a total of 88 full members (plus a number of guest, associate and honorary members); and to have held 225 exhibition showings. In 2012, a touring exhibition visited galleries around Wales. Called The 56 Group Wales: The Founders, it included artworks of the twelve original founders, as well as work from current members. For the previous ten years, businessman Barrie Maskell had spent time tracking down and purchasing work made by each of the twelve original members. This included a visit to one of the surviving founders, John Wright, who was living in Spain. Fifty-six of Maskell's paintings were chosen for the exhibition. The exhibition was shown at venues in Pontypridd, Cardiff and MOMA Wales in Machynlleth. In the same year, a history of the Group's first 56 years by David Moore was published.

In January 2013 a touring exhibition of the group's work, 56:56, opened at Newport Art Gallery.

In 2019 At Cross Purposes, a creative project curated by Frances Woodley, was conceived in collaboration with the 56 Group Wales. New work was created and new partnerships forged, as well as the production of a touring exhibition, and accompanying book in 2023. The project required that 16 members of 56 Group Wales each be partnered with an invited artist from elsewhere in the UK and Ireland, selected by Woodley. Each pair then engaged with Woodley in a three-way email correspondence. The project took place over a series of COVID-19 lockdowns, with artists confined to their makeshift studios. The exhibition toured: School of Art Museum, Aberystwyth University (14 February – 28 April 2023), Oriel Môn, Llangefni, Anglesey (29 April to 11 June 2023), Queen Street Studios Gallery, Belfast (7 – 28 September 2023), and Elysium Gallery Swansea (10 November – 23 December 2023). Artist pairings: Ken Elias / Morwenna Morrison, Pete Williams / Mark Doyle, Robert Harding / Tim Dodds, Sue Hunt / Paula MacArthur, Dilys Jackson / Keith Brown, Carol Hiles / Jane Rainey, Sue Hiley Harris / Michael Geddis, Corinthe Rizvi / Louise Barrington, Martyn Jones / Martin Finnin, Tiff Oben / Garry Barker, Kay Keogh / Michelle McKeown, Harvey Hood / Molly Thompson, Alison Lochhead / Judith Tucker, Rhodri Rees / Ellen Mitchinson, Peter Spriggs / Christine Roychowdhury, Luis Tapia / Louise Manifold.

== Criticism ==
The Group's activities have not always been eulogised. Will Roberts, one of the founder members, who was afterwards (in 1964) asked to withdraw from exhibitions because his work was seen as insufficiently radical, later dismissed the Group as having been "set up by art school teachers who wanted to sell their work". When Rollo Charles, keeper of art at the National Museum of Wales, commented in 1976 that the Group "is now generally regarded as the official avant garde of Welsh art", critic Bryn Richards responded "[t]his must seem to those who founded the group, with such hope, as a veritable kiss of death". Renowned Welsh artist Kyffin Williams was reported in 1981 to have had a strong antipathy for what he described as a group of "predominantly abstract painters or English carpetbaggers, ... who came down to Wales because they could not make it in the metropolis. The 56 Group has taken over Welsh art, and he [Williams] is out of favour in his homeland as a result."

== Membership ==
As of 2023 members included

- Thomas Goddard
- Robert Harding
- Sue Hiley Harris
- Carol Hiles
- Harvey Hood
- Sue Hunt
- Dilys Jackson
- Glyn Jones
- Martyn Jones
- Kay Keogh
- Pauline Le Britton
- Alison Lochhead
- Tiff Oben
- Heather Parnell
- Corinthe Rizvi
- Lisa Sanders
- Peter Spriggs
- Pete Williams

=== Notable members ===
Wikipedia articles are available on the following members and ex-members:

- Jack Crabtree
- Hubert Dalwood
- Kevin Sinnott
- Arthur Giardelli
- Adrian Heath
- Clive Hicks-Jenkins
- Robert Alwyn Hughes
- Martyn Jones
- Heinz Koppel
- Mary Lloyd Jones
- Eric Malthouse
- Phil Nicol
- Peter Prendergast
- Shani Rhys James
- Will Roberts
- David Saunders
- Terry Setch
- Jeffrey Steele
- Norman Toynton
- Michael Tyzack
- Sue Williams
- Ernest Zobole

== Publications ==
- Giardelli, Arthur, ed. (1976). The Artist and how to employ him. Grŵp 56 Cymru 56 Group Wales. ISBN 0-9505005-0-X.
- Woodley, Frances, ed. (2023). At Cross Purposes: 3-way conversations between two artists and a curator. Abertystwyth University.
