= Arts Council of Wales =

Welsh Government sponsored body for funding the arts

- Cyngor Celfyddydau Cymru (Welsh)

Welsh Government Sponsored Body overview
- Formed: 1946
- Jurisdiction: Welsh Government
- Headquarters: Wales Millennium Centre, Bute Place, Cardiff; 51.4653°N 3.1625°W
- Minister responsible: Deputy Minister for Skills and Tertiary Education
- Welsh Government Sponsored Body executive: Cefin Campbell
- Website: www.arts.wales

The Arts Council of Wales (ACW; Welsh: Cyngor Celfyddydau Cymru, CCC) is a Welsh Government-sponsored body, responsible for funding and developing the arts in Wales.

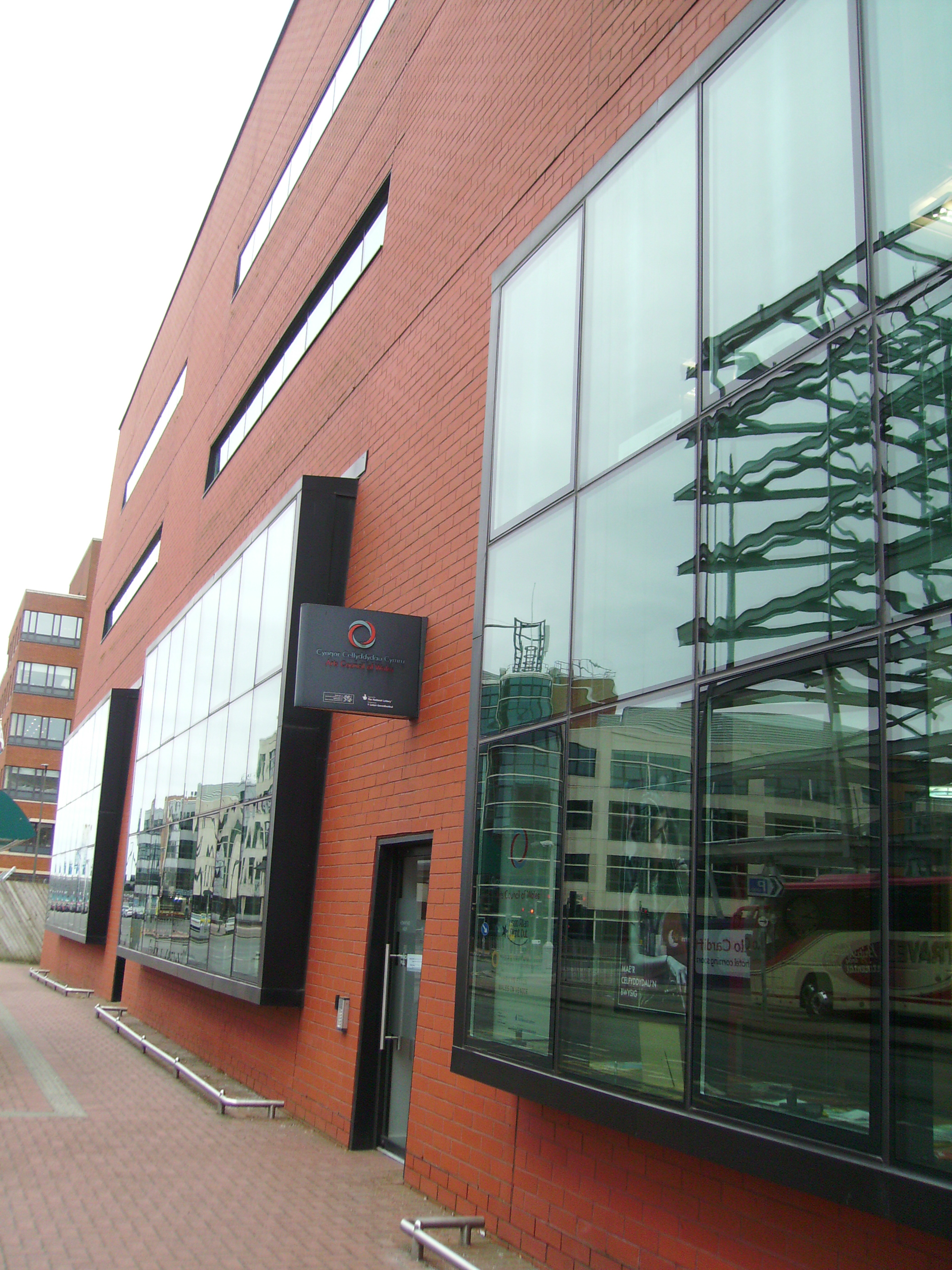
Arts Council of Wales at the Wales Millennium Centre in Cardiff

Established within the Arts Council of Great Britain in 1946, as the Welsh Arts Council (Welsh: Cyngor Celfyddydau Cymru), its English name was changed to the Arts Council of Wales when it was independently established by royal charter on 30 March 1994 (the Welsh name remained the same), upon its merger with the three Welsh regional arts associations. It became accountable to the National Assembly for Wales (now Senedd) on 1 July 1999, when responsibility was transferred from the Secretary of State for Wales.

The Welsh Government provides ACW with money to fund the arts in Wales. ACW also distributes National Lottery funding for the arts in Wales, allocated by the Department for Culture, Media and Sport (DCMS).

The Arts Council of Wales is a registered charity under English and Welsh law and has a board of trustees who meet six times a year, chaired by Maggie Russell. Apart from the Chair, Council members are not paid; they are appointed by the Welsh Government. The Arts Council of Wales has offices in Colwyn Bay, Carmarthen and Cardiff. Dafydd Rhys is its chief executive officer.

The Arts Council partners with the National Eisteddfod of Wales to produce its annual Y Lle Celf exhibition of Welsh art, craft and design.
