= Royal Watercolour Society of Wales =

Muhdi

- Cymdeithas Frenhinol Dyfrlliw Cymru
- Formation: 1959
- Founded at: Cardiff, Wales
- Legal status: Active
- Purpose: Support watercolor artists
- Region served: Wales
- Fields: Watercolor
- Chair: Anthony Douglas-Jones
- Website: www.royalwatercoloursociety.wales

The Royal Watercolour Society of Wales (Welsh: Cymdeithas Frenhinol Dyfrlliw Cymru) is an association of watercolor artists in Wales founded in 1959.

== History ==
The Watercolour Society of Wales was founded in 1959 by six artists in the Cardiff area. The society's first exhibition was held that year at the National Museum Cardiff. At first the members were from the Cardiff area, but in the 1970s and 1980s the society drew in artists from all parts of Wales. Charles, Prince of Wales became a patron of the society on 21 April 2007. He occasionally participates in exhibitions. On 21 October 2013 it was officially announced that Queen Elizabeth II had approved addition of the prefix "Royal" to the society's name. By that time its membership consisted of about forty professional artists who lived and worked in Wales.

== Activities ==
New members are elected to the society in an effort to maintain high standards. In 2015 the painter and printmaker Robert Macdonald became the first elected chair of the society. The society gives its members opportunities to exhibit in respected galleries. It holds two exhibitions annually showing life and landscape of Wales in various locations in Wales. At these exhibitions the artists show work that explores innovative materials, techniques and perspectives. Members have experimented with modern water-soluble media such as acrylics and gouache. Subjects range from fluid seascapes to geometric depictions of industrial objects.

== Sources ==
- Royal Watercolour Society Of Wales Summer Exhibition, Mid Wales Art Centre, March 2016
- Penpont Art exhibition and Open Gardens, Penpont, 2016
- Patronages, Prince of Wales website, 2016
- Wales Office (21 October 2013), Watercolour Society of Wales awarded Royal prefix (press release), UK Government
- "The Watercolour Society of Wales opens a new show", Wales Online, 23 March 2012
