= Terry Setch =

British painter

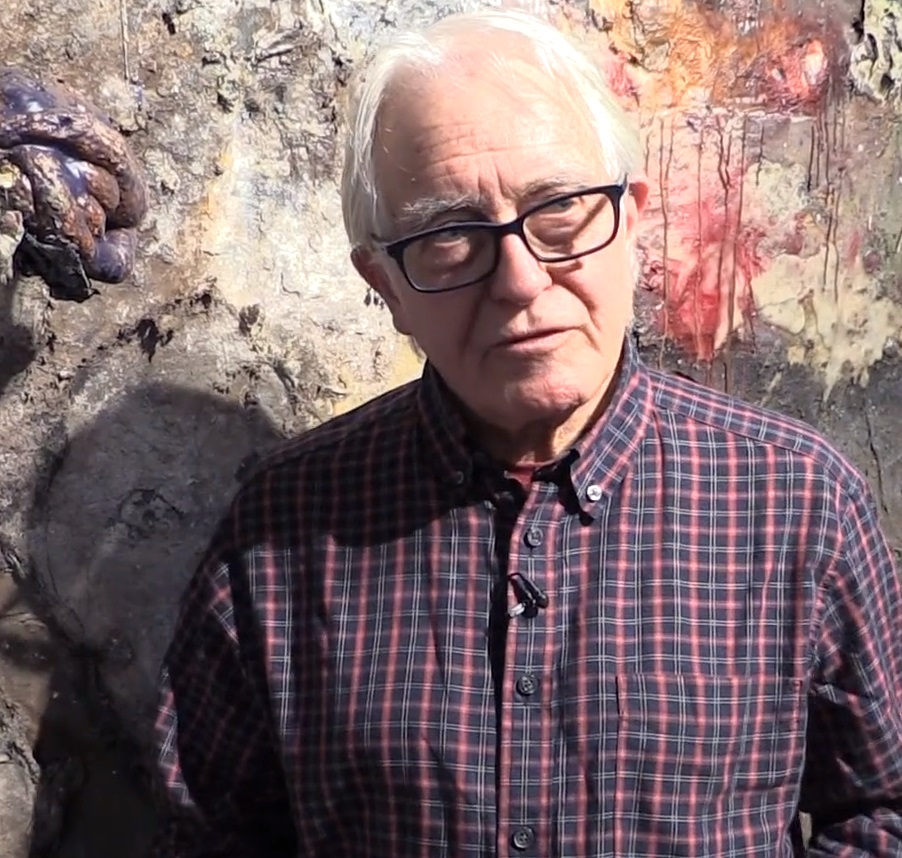
- Terry Setch, Flowers, Cork Street, London. March 2016
- Born: 1936 (age 89–90); Lewisham, London, England
- Education: Slade School of Fine Art
- Known for: Painting, mixed media
- Elected: Royal West of England Academy, Royal Academy
- Website: www.terrysetch.co.uk

Terry Setch (born 1936) is a painter and Royal Academy (RA) member who lives in Penarth, Wales.

== Education and career ==
Setch attended Saturday classes at Sutton and Cheam School of Art, followed by a degree course at the Slade School of Fine Art, London. While at college he was recognised and took part in the Young Contemporaries exhibitions in 1957, 1959 and 1960. He moved to Cardiff, Wales in June 1964 to become senior painting lecturer at Cardiff College of Art.

He was a member of the 56 Group Wales from 1966 until 1979, later saying he left because it had become too risk averse and part of the establishment.

Setch styles himself as a 'political' artist, taking the threats to the environment as an important subject. Much of his recent inspiration has been taken from his local South Wales beaches. "There are issues of waste, the enormous amount of waste and the threat to the environment" he said at his retrospective exhibition in 2011. His paintings have included Campaign for Nuclear Disarmament campaigns and the Chernobyl nuclear disaster as their subjects.

Setch retired from teaching in 2001.

He was elected as a Royal Academician in 2009. Art critic and media personality Brian Sewell noted Setch's paintings at the 2011 Royal Academy Summer Exhibition, though he also asked why "are the squalid little squidges of Terry Setch hanging on these august walls?"

== Personal life ==
Setch married Dianne Shaw in 1967. They have a daughter, Eve.
