= Josef Herman =

Polish artist (1911–2000)

Josef Herman OBE RA
- Born: 3 January 1911; Warsaw, Poland
- Died: 19 February 2000 (aged 89); West London, England
- Known for: Painting
- Website: Josef Herman Art Foundation

Josef Herman OBE RA (3 January 1911 – 19 February 2000) was a Polish-British painter who influenced contemporary art, particularly in the United Kingdom. He was part of a generation of central and eastern European Jewish refugee artists who emigrated to escape Nazi persecution. He saw himself as part of a tradition of European figurative artists who painted working people, a tradition that included Courbet, Millet and Van Gogh, Kathe Kollwitz and the Flemish Expressionist Constant Permeke. For eleven years he lived in Ystradgynlais, a mining community in South Wales.

== Biography ==
Herman was born in Warsaw into a Polish-Jewish family, on 3 January 1911. His father, David, was an illiterate shoemaker, his mother was called Sarah Malkah. He was the eldest of three children. His brother was called Shmiel, his sister was called Zelda. Josef grew up speaking Yiddish and he was profoundly influenced by Yiddish culture. From 1930 he attended the Warsaw School of Art, where he trained as a typesetter and graphic designer and then for two years worked briefly as a graphic artist. In 1938 at the age of 27, Herman left Poland for Brussels. He was introduced to many of the prominent artists then working in the city. After the beginning of World War II and the German invasion of Belgium, he escaped to France and then in 1940 to Great Britain.

In Britain, he first lived in Glasgow, where he met the sculptor Benno Schotz who became a lifelong friend and he was reunited with the Polish-Jewish artist Jankel Adler. Between 1940 and 1943 he contributed to a remarkable wartime artistic renaissance in the city. Herman learned through the Red Cross that his entire family had perished in the Warsaw Ghetto. In 1942 he met and married Catriona MacLeod and he had his first exhibition in Scotland at Aitken Dott & Son, Edinburgh. While in Scotland he drew and painted scenes of Jewish life from Poland which only became more widely known in the 1980s.

In 1943 he moved to London and held his first London exhibition with L. S. Lowry. Herman's own style was bold and distinctive, involving strong shapes with minimal detail. He continued to work until the late 1990s.

Herman is best known for his paintings of working people, including peasants, fishermen and, most notably, coal miners. The latter became a particular interest for Herman during the eleven years that he lived in Ystradgynlais, a mining community in South Wales, beginning in 1944. For the first four years he stayed in rooms at the Pen-y-bont Inn. He became part of the community, where he was fondly nicknamed "Joe Bach" (Little Joe). Herman is quoted as saying: "I stayed here because I found ALL I required. I arrived a stranger for a fortnight. The fortnight became eleven years."

When commissioned in 1951 to paint a mural for the Festival of Britain, Herman painted a group of coal miners. His work Miners (1951) showed six men resting above ground after their work. Herman said, "I think it is one of my key pictures and the most important one I did in Wales." The mural is held in the permanent collection of the Glynn Vivian Art Gallery, affiliated with the Swansea Museum.

Leaving Wales in 1955 because his health was affected by the damp climate, Herman returned to London. He was awarded the Gold Medal for Fine Art at the 1962 National Eisteddfod of Wales.

In 1955 Herman met Nini Ettlinger, whom he married in 1961. They had three children: David (born 1957), Sara (1962–1966) and Rebekah (born 1967). In 1962 the family moved to Little Cornard, near Sudbury, Suffolk. In 1971 the family moved briefly to Hundon also in West Suffolk. From 1972 Herman lived in the house in West London where he died in February 2000.

In the 1980 Birthday Honours Herman was appointed an Officer of the Order of the British Empire (OBE) for services to British Art and was elected to the Royal Academy of Arts in 1990.

== Legacy and honours ==
- 2004, the Josef Herman Foundation was established in Ystradgynlais, to honour the artist and his legacy, and encourage study of his work, as well as arts initiatives in South Wales.
- 2010, Michael Waters' play, The Secret of Belonging, about Josef Herman and his years in Ystradgynlais, was produced by the National Theatre Wales. The play included a contemporary folk-influenced score by Swansea musician and composer Andy Jones, and it was performed by the Antic Theatre. They first performed at Swansea, then took the play on a tour of South Wales during April/May 2010.

== Bibliography ==
- Bohm-Duchen, M. (2009) The Art and Life of Josef Herman. Lund Humphries, Surrey.
- Heller, R. (1998) Josef Herman: The work is the Life. Momentum, London.
- Herman, N. (1996) Josef Hermann: A Working Life. Quartet Books, London.
- Herman, J. (1988) Note From A Welsh Diary. Free Association Books, London.
- Herman, J. (1975) Related Twilights: Notes from an Artist's Diary. Robson, London.

== Selected exhibitions ==
- 2014–15 Refiguring the 50s: Joan Eardley, Sheila Fell, Eva Frankfurter, Josef Herman and L.S. Lowry, Ben Uri Gallery, London
- 2009 Josef Herman: The Art & Life, Flowers Central, London
- 2000 The Work is the Life, Flowers East, London
- 1994 Related Twilights, Fifty years of Drawing and Painting (1944 – 94), Angela Flowers Gallery, London
- 1989 Retrospective Exhibition, National Museum of Wales, Cardiff
- 1989 Recent works 1984–89 and Homage to the Women of Greenham Common, Angela Flowers Gallery, London
- 1980 4th retrospective exhibition, Camden Arts Centre, London
- 1975 3rd retrospective exhibition, Glasgow
- 1957 Recent works, Roland, Browse and Delbanco.
- 1956 2nd retrospective exhibition, Whitechapel Art Gallery, London Drawings,
- 1955 1st retrospective exhibition, Wakefield City Art Gallery
- 1954 Geffrye Museum, London, exhibition with Henry Moore
- 1949 Ben Uri Gallery, London, exhibition with Martin Bloch
- 1943 1st solo exhibition in London, Reid Gallery, London
- 1943 Lefevre, London, exhibition with L.S. Lowry
- 1932 1st exhibition in Warsaw
