= Alfred Janes =

Welsh painter (1911–1999)

- Alfred Janes c. 1960 at his studio in Nicholastan Hall, Gower, Wales
- Born: Alfred George Janes; 30 June 1911; Swansea, Wales
- Died: 3 February 1999 (aged 87); London, England
- Education: Royal Academy Schools, London
- Known for: Painting, drawing

Alfred George Janes (30 June 1911 – 3 February 1999) was a Welsh artist, who worked in Swansea and Croydon. He experimented with many forms, but is best known for his meticulous still lifes and portraits.

He is also remembered as one of The Kardomah Gang, an informal group of young artists in Swansea that included the poets Dylan Thomas and Vernon Watkins, and the composer Daniel Jones.

== Early life ==
Alfred George Janes was born on 30 June 1911, in the city centre of Swansea, South Wales, above his parents' fruit and flower shop in Castle Square. He attended the Bishop Gore School and then the Swansea School of Art and Crafts (now part of University of Wales Trinity Saint David). At the age of 16 he exhibited at the 1928 National Eisteddfod (held in Treorchy that year). Three years later, while he was still concentrating on still lifes and portraits, he was commissioned to paint a portrait of the mayor of Swansea, Arthur Lovell. In 1931 he painted a portrait of a 17-year-old Mervyn Levy, thought to have been the painting that won him a scholarship to study art at the Royal Academy Schools in London. At the Royal Academy Schools his drawing tutors included Tom Monnington, but he was also stimulated by the modernist works displayed in the commercial galleries of nearby Cork Street, and he did not complete his Academy course. While in London, he shared several flats in and around Chelsea with contemporaries; at first with William Scott, the Scots-Irish artist whom Janes met at the Royal Academy Schools.

== The Kardomah Gang ==
In 1932 Janes became part of a group of bohemian Swansea friends that included poets Dylan Thomas, Charles Fisher, John Prichard and Vernon Watkins, composer Daniel Jones, artist Mervyn Levy and "Marxist scholar" Bert Trick. Collectively, they became known as The Kardomah Gang or The Kardomah Boys, named after the Kardomah Café, in Castle Street, Swansea, where they met. The Café stood opposite the offices of the South Wales Daily Post, to which Fisher and Thomas were apprenticed in 1930, after they had left school.

Dylan Thomas (1934) National Museum of Wales collection

Although Janes and Thomas had been to the same school, Janes was some three years older than Thomas so they didn't get to know each other until after their schooldays. They first met in 1932 through their mutual friend, the musician Daniel Jones.

In 1934 Janes, Thomas and Levy shared a flat at 5 Redcliffe Street, Earls Court and subsequently at Coleherne Road, Earls Court. In a radio broadcast in the early 1950s Dylan Thomas described how they shared rooms while Janes was a student at the Royal Academy of Arts, described Janes's meticulous technique and stated that, "After many Academy awards, and several paintings hung in London galleries, he returned to Swansea to work and experiment, which were synonymous."

Janes created three portraits of Thomas. The first, painted in Coleherne Road in 1934, is oil on canvas, displaying Janes's technique at this period of cutting lines into the paint with his pen-knife, to provide relief and focus. When Janes decided in 1936 to return to Swansea, he left his accumulated works behind and most are now lost; but the portrait of Dylan Thomas and some other paintings and drawings had been acquired by Cedric Morris and Augustus John, to form part of an exhibition of Welsh artists held in Cardiff, and the portrait was purchased in 1935 by the National Museum Cardiff. Later Janes "...complicated the technique by marking a polygonal grid on to the board before painting the subject, and then retracing and incising it into the finished painting. In this way he was able to achieve a unique crystalline brilliance of image." The second portrait of Thomas is held by Swansea University. Janes's last portrait of Thomas is pen and ink on paper, drawn around 1964, a decade after the poet's death; it forms part of the permanent collection of the Glynn Vivian Art Gallery, Swansea.

Janes also made portraits of Vernon Watkins the poet; James Henry Govier, the painter, etcher and engraver; William Grant Murray, the painter and head of Swansea School of Art and Crafts; and Gwilym Thomas, the ceramic artist.

In 1936 Janes settled in Swansea again, and taught part-time at the Swansea School of Art and Crafts. At this period he painted a series of still lifes. As well as being a painter Janes was also an accomplished pianist, and like his friend Ceri Richards he saw parallels between the arts of painting and music.

== Wartime and after ==
In World War II he was a soldier in the Pioneer Corps. In November 1940, while on leave, he married Mary Ross (1913–2006), who had been an amateur actress in the Swansea Little Theatre. He and Mary had two children – a son and a daughter (Hilly, born 1954). Janes was posted to Egypt, where he worked for two and a half years in a prisoner-of-war camp. There he learnt Swahili and Italian, and made friendships with some of the Italian prisoners, which he maintained in later years.

After the war Janes returned to Swansea and resumed his teaching at the Swansea School of Art and Crafts and his painting. At this period he made portraits of Vernon Watkins and Daniel Jones. In 1953 he and his wife settled at Nicholaston in Gower.

In 1963 Janes moved to London, accepting a post at Croydon College of Art, and from then until his death he lived at Dulwich. Among the younger generation whom he encouraged were Bridget Riley and Bruce McLean.

He died in London on 3 February 1999. He is buried in the graveyard of St Andrew's Church, Penrice, Gower.

In 1999 the Glynn Vivian Art Gallery, Swansea, held a retrospective exhibition of his work. In 2011, to mark the centenary of his birth, an exhibition was held at Oriel Kooywood, Cardiff.
