= James Henry Govier =

English painter and etcher (1910–1974)

James Henry Govier (1 August 1910 – 21 December 1974) was a British painter and etcher, who worked in Swansea and East Anglia.

== Early life and education ==
Govier was born on 1 August 1910, at Oakley, Buckinghamshire. He was the second child and only son of his parents, Henry Govier and Mary Ann Measey. He had an older sister, Elizabeth, and a younger sister, Florence. In 1914, the family moved to the small town of Gorseinon in Gower near Swansea, where James was educated at the local school.

At the age of fourteen, he left school to work in one of the local tin works; and at the age of seventeen, he became an evening student at the Swansea School of Art and Crafts (now part of Swansea Metropolitan University). James was taken to see William Grant Murray, the head of the School; and at the age of twenty, he gained a Glamorgan County Scholarship to study full-time at the School.

From 1930, James came under the influence of William Grant Murray; and he exhibited with many Welsh artists, including Alfred Janes, Ceri Richards and Kenneth Hancock. In 1935 he exhibited with past students at the Glynn Vivian Art Gallery in Swansea. From 1935 James studied in London at the Royal College of Art under the tutorship of Malcolm Osborne, RA, RE. At this time he became an acquaintance of the poet Dylan Thomas, and worked with other Welsh artists in London. In 1938, he gained his ARCA along with the Art Travelling Scholarship, which he was unable to take up because of the outbreak of war. From 1938, Govier worked as Malcolm Osborne’s assistant at the Royal College of Art, and also helped Robert Austin 1940–42.

== Career ==
In August 1940, Govier joined the Royal Engineers constructing gun emplacements and in the development of chemical warfare. In 1942, by order of the Air Ministry, he was transferred to the Royal Air Force model making section for North Africa and Italy, producing models for the Dambuster raids, the D-Day landings and objectives in Africa and Italy.

James was demobilised in 1945, and started to exhibit with the Aylesbury and District Art Society, becoming an acquaintance of the Society’s patron, Augustus John.

In 1947, he became art master at Eye Grammar School in Suffolk, and resided in Eye until his marriage in 1950, when he moved to Hoxne, also in Suffolk. Govier continued to exhibit with the Aylesbury Art Society and Ipswich Art Club.

In 1965, the Eye Grammar School closed, and Govier moved to Diss Grammar School, where he remained until his early retirement in 1972. He continued to paint oils and watercolours of East Anglia, including many genre subjects.

== Personal life and death ==
In 1950 Govier married Freda Muriel Tye of Hoxne, a student at Ipswich Art School specialising as a commercial display artist. The couple started married life in Hoxne, and in 1957 moved to ‘The Retreat’, a large thatched house in Hoxne. They had a son, Stephen James.

Govier died on 21 December, 1974 at his home, 'The Retreat', in Hoxne.

== Legacy ==
Govier left behind him a large variety of works, from small, delicate pencil drawings and etchings to vibrant oils and translucent watercolours. Some of his canvasses are almost impressionistic in style, showing the quality of the chiaroscuro he so frequently used.

James Henry Govier's works can be seen at the National Museum Cardiff, the National Library of Wales, the Glynn Vivian Art Gallery (Swansea); The British Museum; Ashmolean Museum, Oxford; Christchurch Mansion, Ipswich; Norwich Castle Museum and Buckinghamshire County Museum.
