= Hywel Davies =

Hywel Davies may refer to:

- Hywel Davies (broadcaster) (1919–1965), Welsh radio broadcaster and television interviewer
- Hywel Davies (doctor) (1924–2016) cardiologist and writer
- Hywel Davies (journalist), British fashion writer
- Hywel Davies (rugby league) (born 1981), Welsh rugby league footballer and coach
- Hywel Islwyn Davies (priest) (1909–1981), Dean of Bangor
- Hywel Davies (jockey) (born 1957), Welsh jockey
- Hywel Davies (footballer) (1902–1976), Welsh international footballer

== See also ==
- Howel Davies (Methodist minister) (1716–1770), Welsh Methodist minister
