= Bishop Gore School =

Secondary school in Swansea, Wales

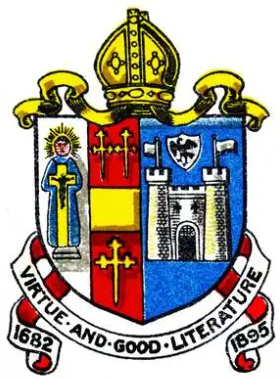

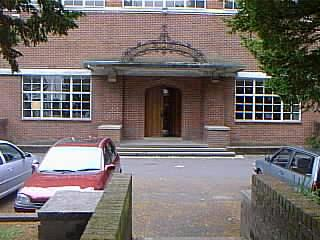

Location
- De La Beche Road; Swansea, SA2 9AP; United Kingdom; 51.61525°N 3.98838°W

Information
- Type: Comprehensive
- Motto: Virtue and good literature
- Established: September 14, 1682; 344 years ago
- Local authority: Swansea
- Headteacher: Steven Wilson
- Gender: Mixed
- Age: 11 to 18
- Houses: Rotherslade, Langland, Caswell, Limeslade, Bracelet
- Colours: Years 7–11; Maroon and Gold; Years 12–13; Black
- Last Inspection: May 2015
- Pupils on roll: 1,219 pupils
- 6th form: 163 pupils
- Alumni: Old Goreans
- Website: http://www.bishopgore.net/

The Bishop Gore School (Welsh: Ysgol Esgob Gore) is a secondary school in Swansea in Wales, founded on 14 September 1682 by Hugh Gore (1613–1691), Bishop of Waterford and Lismore. It is situated in Sketty, close to Singleton Park and Swansea University. In December 2013 the school was ranked in the second highest of five bands by the Welsh Government, based on performance in exams, value added performance, disadvantaged pupils' performance, and attendance.

== History ==
=== Grammar school ===
The school was endowed and established in 1682, as a Free Grammar School by Hugh Gore, Bishop of Waterford and Lismore, for "the gratuitous instruction of twenty boys, sons of the most indigent burgesses, and in the event of a dissolution of the corporation, to sons of the poorest inhabitants of the town." Initially located in historic Goat Street (on a site now part of Princess Way in the city centre), it has since known several names and locations. In September 1853 the school, by then named the Swansea Grammar School for Boys, moved to Mount Pleasant into a new building designed by the architect Thomas Taylor. The building was extended in 1869 to a design by Benjamin Bucknall.

From 1895 the site was shared with the newly created Swansea Intermediate and Technical School for Boys (later the co-educational Swansea Technical College). Under the provisions of the 1902 Education Act the running of both institutions was taken over by Swansea Council.

During World War II the buildings were largely destroyed by incendiary bombs. Discussions about the rebuilding of the site led to the decision to move the Grammar School to a new site elsewhere in Swansea and in 1952 it relocated to newly built premises located in De La Beche Road, Sketty, at which point it was renamed Bishop Gore Grammar School and subsequently, from 1970, Bishop Gore Comprehensive School.

An extension was built in the 1970s and further Design and Technology extensions in the 1990s.

=== Comprehensive ===
Until 1970, Bishop Gore was an all-boys grammar school, then it merged with the girls' grammar school Glanmôr and Townhill Secondary School to become Bishop Gore Co-educational Comprehensive school in 1971.

== School today ==
As of 2015, Bishop Gore has 1,002 male and female students aged 11–18, including 112 in the sixth form. The sixth form has a separate lounge, facilities and uniform. The headteacher is Steven Wilson. Set at the head of Singleton Park, close to the village of Sketty and the seafront, Bishop Gore is built around two quadrangles. Each pupil is assigned to a house: Caswell, Langland, Bracelet, Rotherslade or Limeslade (named after beaches on the nearby Gower peninsula), which they retain throughout their time at the school. The school year includes an Eisteddfod, inter-house sports tournaments, productions by Bishop Gore Theatre Company, and end-of-year balls for senior students.

In January 2010, an inspection report was published which awarded Bishop Gore the highest possible grades in all categories. As a result of this the school was featured as a 'best practice' case study by Estyn and was named in the chief inspector's annual report – being the only secondary school in Wales to achieve this recognition.

== Dylan Thomas ==
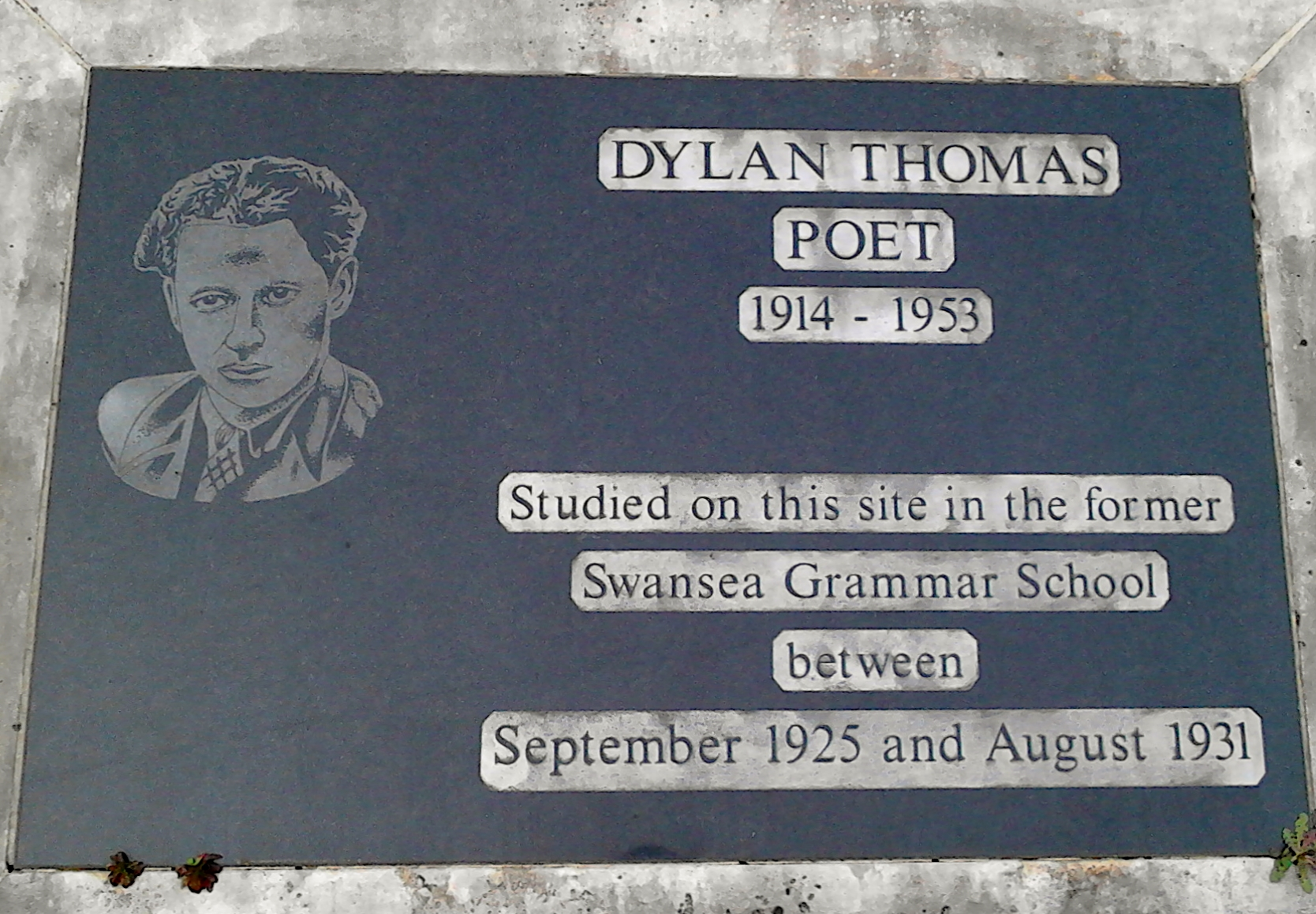
Memorial plaque on the former site of Swansea Grammar School

The most famous alumnus of Bishop Gore is almost certainly the poet, playwright and author Dylan Thomas (1914–1953). His father, David John (D. J.) Thomas was senior English master at the school, then known as Swansea Grammar School. Not a distinguished pupil, he nonetheless gained attention through publishing his first poem in 1926, "The Song Of The Mischievous Dog" and in 1928 winning the school's annual one-mile race. He left in 1931 to begin work at The South Wales Daily Post as a junior reporter.

In 1988 the main surviving structure of the 1869 former school building was renamed the Dylan Thomas Building in honour of its former pupil.

== Notable alumni ==
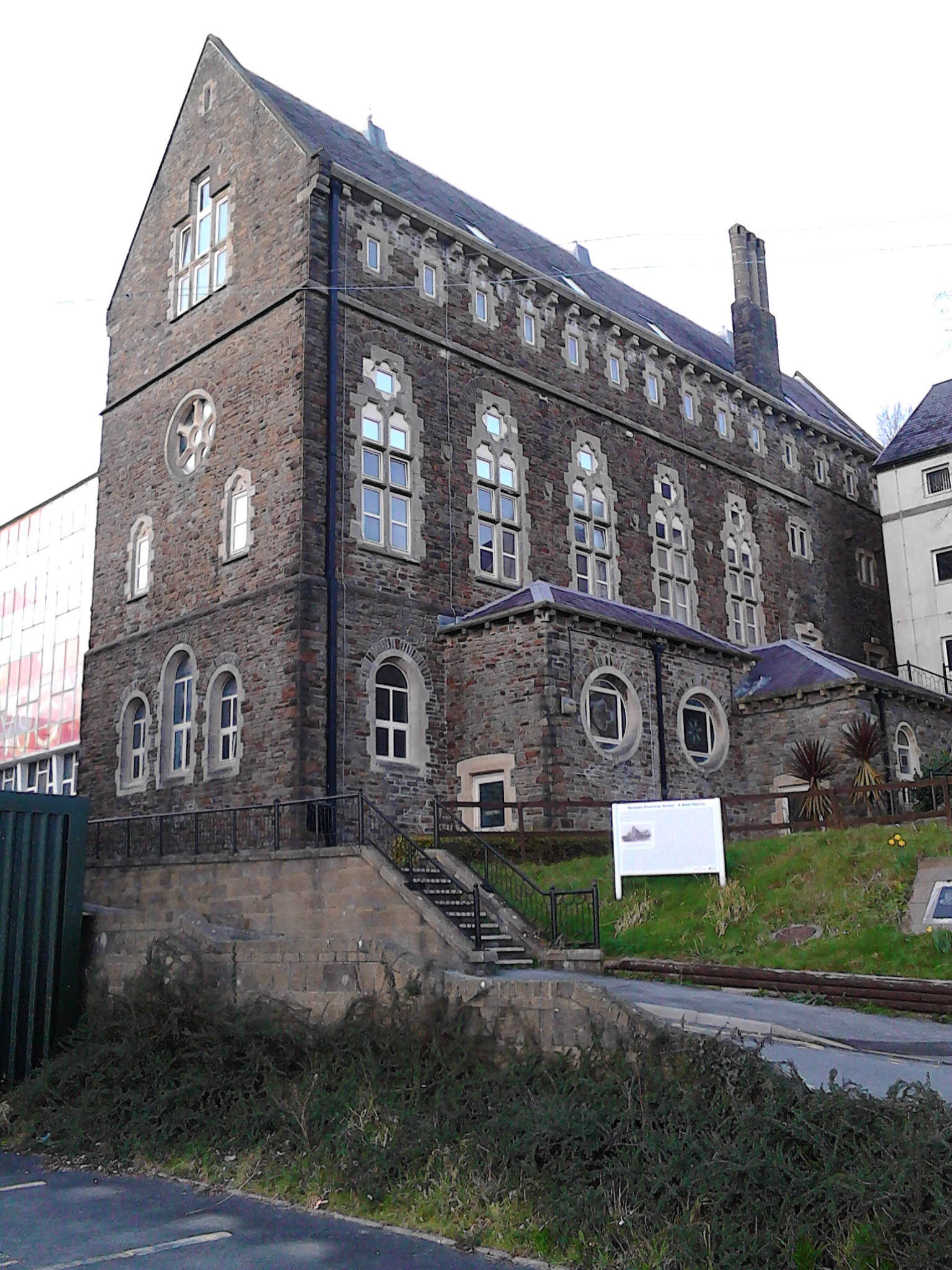
The main surviving structure of the former Swansea Grammar School site on Mount Pleasant was renamed the Dylan Thomas Building in 1988 to honour its former pupil.

Notable Old Goreans have included:

- Martin Amis, writer
- Donald Anderson, Baron Anderson of Swansea, politician
- Gareth Armstrong, actor
- Henry Bruce, 1st Baron Aberdare, politician, Home Secretary 1868–73
- Prof Sir John Cadogan, CBE, President of the Royal Society of Chemistry
- Rt Rev Graham Chadwick, bishop and anti-apartheid campaigner
- Hywel Davies, cardiologist and author
- Prof Sir Sam Edwards FRS, physicist and university administrator
- Paul Ferris, writer
- Charles Fisher, journalist
- Brian Flowers, Baron Flowers, FRS, physicist
- Neville George, geologist
- Sir Alex Gordon, CBE, architect
- Sir William Grove, scientist and judge
- Rt Rev Llewellyn Henry Gwynne, Bishop of Egypt and the Sudan
- Aneurin Hughes, EU diplomat
- Graham Huxtable, swimmer
- Alfred Janes, artist
- John Gwyn Jeffreys, FRS, conchologist
- Daniel Jones, composer
- Ernest Jones, neurologist and psychoanalyst, biographer of Sigmund Freud
- Mervyn Jones, Governor of the Turks and Caicos Islands
- Peter Jones, broadcaster
- Sir Archie Lamb KBE CMG DFC, diplomat
- Mervyn Levy, artist and critic
- Prof Patrick McGorry AO, psychiatrist, Australian of the Year.
- John Metcalf, composer
- David Miles, economist
- Prof Dewi Zephaniah Phillips philosopher
- Colin Phipps, geologist and Labour MP
- Dylan Thomas, writer
- Wynford Vaughan-Thomas, writer
- Vernon Watkins, poet

=== International Rugby players ===
Several Old Goreans have played international rugby, for the Wales national rugby union team or the Wales women's national rugby union team

- Paul Arnold
- Roger Blyth
- Stuart Davies
- Alun Wyn Jones, captain of Wales
- Haydn Mainwaring
- Richie Pugh, Wales Rugby sevens captain at the 2006 Commonwealth Games
- Idwal Rees
- Belinda Trotter, played in the first Welsh women's team in 1987.
- Geoff Wheel

== See also ==
- The Kardomah Gang, 1930s Swansea literary and cultural circle, several members of which attended the school
