= The Kardomah Gang =

Welsh musical group

The Kardomah Gang, Kardomah Boys, or Kardomah Group was a group of bohemian friends – artists, musicians, poets and writers – who, in the 1930s, frequented the Kardomah Café in Castle Street, Swansea, Wales.

== Members of the Gang ==
Regular members of the Gang included poets Charles Fisher, Dylan Thomas, Bert Trick, John Prichard and Vernon Watkins, composer and linguist Daniel Jones, artists Alfred Janes and Mervyn Levy, the broadcaster Wynford Vaughan-Thomas, Mabley Owen and Tom Warner.

== The Kardomah Café ==
The café was located opposite the offices of the South Wales Evening Post newspaper where Thomas and Fisher worked. This was where the group drank coffee and discussed many subjects including Einstein, Epstein, Garbo, Stravinsky, death, religion and Picasso.

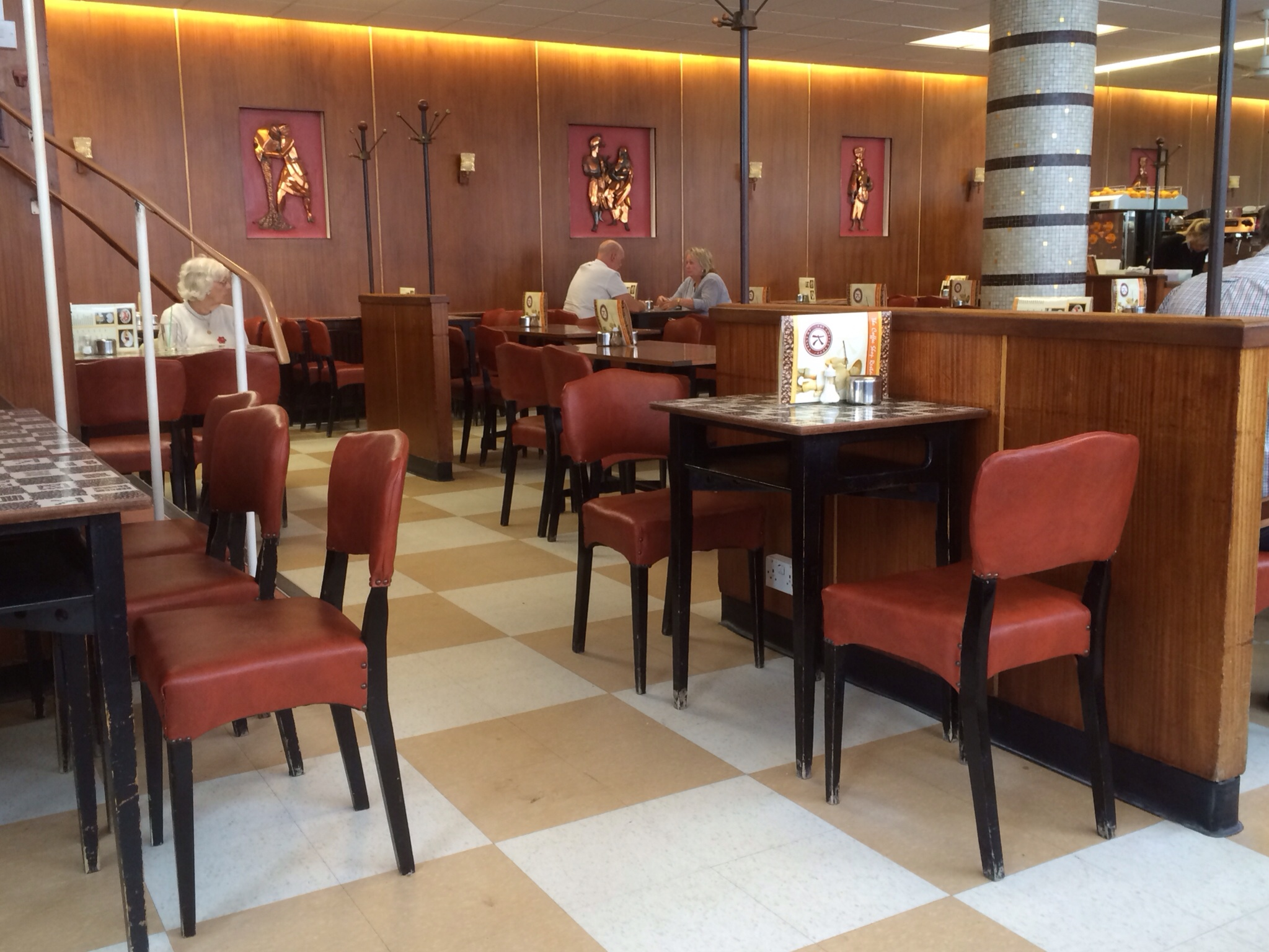
Kardomah Cafe, Swansea

In a letter, dated 26 May 1934 to Pamela Hansford Johnson, Dylan Thomas writes about their first meeting in the Kardomah Café:

I'm in a dreadful mess now. I can hardly hold the pencil or hold the paper. This has been coming for weeks. And the last four days have completed it. I'm absolutely at the point of breaking now. You remember how I was when I said goodbye to you for the first time. In the Kardomah when I loved you so much and was too shy to tell you.

== The Blitz ==
In February 1941, Swansea was heavily bombed by the Luftwaffe, in a 'Three Nights Blitz' Castle Street was just one of the many streets in Swansea that suffered badly; the rows of shops, including the 'Kardomah Café', were destroyed. After the bombing, Dylan Thomas came back to visit Swansea. He later wrote about the devastation in his radio play entitled Return Journey: “The Kardomah cafe was razed to the snow, the voices of the coffee drinkers - poets, painters, and musicians in their beginnings - all lost”.

== Relocation of Kardomah Café ==
The Kardomah Café reopened after the war in a new location in Portland Street, a short walk from where the original stood. The café's Castle Street site was originally the site of the Congregational church where Dylan Thomas's parents married in 1903.

Recollections of the cafe and people who met there were recorded by Fisher and are available at kardomahgroup.net

- "My recollections of the place date from the year I started working for the Post (1934?) Dylan, briefly a reporter at the same time as myself, was in the process of leaving the paper and preparing his assault on literary London. (But he and I were in the habit of meeting there even before then, in Grammar School days (see: Bishop Gore School) when editing the school magazine was used as a pretext for cutting classes)" etc...
