= Frances Richards (British artist) =

English painter (1903–1985)

- Born: Frances Clayton; 1 August 1903; Burslem, England
- Died: 14 February 1985 (aged 81)
- Education: Burslem School of Art; Royal College of Art
- Known for: Painting; embroidery; illustration
- Spouse: Ceri Richards

Frances Richards (née Clayton; 1 August 1903 - 14 February 1985) was a British painter, embroiderer, and illustrator.

== Biography ==
Frances Clayton was born in 1903 in Burslem, in the Staffordshire Potteries, the daughter of John Clayton, a pottery artist. Both sides of the Clayton family were from long-established pottery working families. Richards attended the Burslem School of Art from 1919 to 1924, initially on a part-time basis. She worked as a pottery designer at the Paragon China company while a student at Burslem. She won an annual national scholarship to the Royal College of Art in London for students who had worked in the industry. She studied at the RCA from 1924 to 1927 and specialised in tempera and fresco painting and studied the writings of the early Italian Renaissance painter Cennino Cennini. While at the RCA Richards won a sculpture prize and demonstrated mould-making techniques to other students. She continued to paint in tempera after leaving the college. At the Royal College she met the Welsh artist Ceri Richards. They married in July 1929 and had two daughters, Rachel (born 1932) and Rhiannon (born 1945). Rachel married paleontologist Colin Patterson.

From 1928 to 1939, Richards worked as a teacher in the textile department at the Camberwell School of Art. During the 1930s Richards exhibited with the London Group and in 1937 produced decorations for the P&O cruise liner Orcades.

During World War II, Richards and her husband moved to Alphamstone in Essex and she taught at Furzedown Training College in Tooting. Later in the war, the college was relocated to Cardiff where, by coincidence, Ceri Richards had taken the post of Head of Painting at the Cardiff School of Art. After the war Frances returned to work at Camberwell School of Art, and taught there for almost 30 years during which time she also worked at the Chelsea School of Art.

During the 1950s and 1960s Richards was a regular exhibitor at several commercial galleries in London, including the Hanover Gallery, the Leicester Galleries and, in particular, the Redfern Gallery. Richards was a keen reader of poetry, particularly the work of William Blake, and her exhibition catalogues often contained poems or verse. In 1980, the Campbell & Franks Gallery in London held a large retrospective exhibition with paintings, drawings, engravings, embroideries and early tempera works from over fifty years of her artistic career. The Tate in London holds several pieces by Richards including her 1957 tempera painting Left and Right of the Long Path.

She died on 14 February 1985, aged 81. In 2019, an exhibition of her work was held in the Glynn Vivian Art Gallery, Swansea.

== Influences ==
Richards admired the early Italian renaissance painters Giotto, Piero della Francesca and Fra Angelico; the British artists Samuel Palmer, William Blake and David Jones; and the poetry of the Psalms, the Song of Solomon, George Herbert and Arthur Rimbaud. Her work appears to have been little influenced by her husband's painting. Mel Gooding writes:

...for over fifty years her own quiet and formalised figurative art was unaffected by her daily closeness to the extravagant and sometimes violent drama of [Ceri] Richards's painting.

== Artforms ==
- Painting, including tempera
- Illustration
- Printmaking
- Embroidered fabric panels (toiles brodées)

== Works illustrated ==
- The Acts of the Apostles (from the Holy Bible). In The Fleuron, A Journal of Typography, vol 7, editor Stanley Morison. Cambridge University Press, 1930; New York, Doubleday Page, 1930. Richards made further illustrations to Acts which were published in 1980.
- The Book of Revelation (from the Holy Bible), lithographic illustrations. London, Faber and Faber, 1931; New York, Scribner's, 1931. Illustrations commissioned by T. S. Eliot.
- The Book of Lamentations (from the Holy Bible), 1969
- Les Illuminations, prose poems by Arthur Rimbaud. Curwen Studio, 1975.
- Some Poems with Drawings, Skelton's Press / Enitharmon Press, 1983.
- More Poems with Drawings, Skelton's Press / Enitharmon Press, 1984.

== Exhibitions ==
Richards's work has been shown in many solo and two-person exhibitions, including:

- 1945: Redfern Gallery, London
- 1949: Toiles brodées by Frances Richards, Redfern Gallery, London
- 1950: Toiles brodées by Frances Richards, Hannover Gallery, London
- 1954: Redfern Gallery, London
- 1964: Tempera Printing by Frances Richards, Leicester Galleries, London
- 1967: Solo exhibition, Oriel Fach, St Davids
- 1969: Leicester Galleries, London
- 1972: Ceri Richards Paintings and Drawings, Frances Richards Flower Paintings, Aldeburgh Festival, Snape, Suffolk
- 1975: Ceri and Frances Richards Paintings and Drawings, Patrick Searle Gallery, London
- 1978: Paintings by Frances Richards (concurrent with Ceri Richards Retrospective Exhibition), Bruton Gallery, Bruton, Somerset
- 1980: Frances Richards, paintings, drawings, engravings, lithographs, embroideries, from 1926 to 1979, Campbell and Franks Gallery, London
- 1981: Frances Richards and Jonathon Gibbs, Holsworthy Gallery, London
- 2019: Frances Richards: An Artist Apart, Glynn Vivian Art Gallery, Swansea

== Public collections ==
Richards' work is in public collections, including:

- Tate
- Victoria and Albert Museum
- National Museum Cardiff
- Glynn Vivian Art Gallery, Swansea
