= Mervyn Levy =

Welsh artist (1914–1996)

Mervyn Levy (11 February 1914 – 14 April 1996) was a Welsh artist, art teacher and writer on art. Born in Swansea, where he became a friend of the painter Alfred Janes, the poet Dylan Thomas and the musician Daniel Jones, he spent most of his teaching career in Bristol and London, and made several popular television series about painting techniques. He published monographs on contemporary artists, and a catalogue raisonnee of the works of his friend the painter L. S. Lowry.

== Biography ==
Mervyn Montague Levy was born on 11 February 1914, in Swansea, Wales, the son of Louis Levy and Have Levy (née Rubenstein). One of his two siblings was a sister five years younger than he. When he was about seven years old he began attending Mrs Hole's preparatory school in Mirador Crescent, where he met the future poet, Dylan Thomas, with whom he would associate later as one of The Kardomah Gang. When he was eight, Levy's mother died, and his father engaged a series of nurses to look after Mervyn and his siblings. Levy went to study art in London at the Royal College of Art, and in 1935 won a prize for Drawing. During this period Levy shared rooms with Dylan Thomas and the painter Alfred Janes in Redcliffe Street, and afterwards in rooms where they were joined by the painter William Scott. A striking portrait of Levy in 1935 was made by Alfred Janes. Levy drew several portraits of Dylan Thomas.

During the Second World War Levy was a Captain in the Royal Army Educational Corps.

After the War Levy devoted his energies first to teaching, and afterwards to writing on art.

He first became an overseas lecturer on art for the War Office, in Gibraltar and Germany. On leaving the army he taught art at Bristol, at Bristol University Adult Education Department and afterwards at the Royal West of England Academy, and combined these posts with teaching at London University Department of Extra-Mural Studies. During the 1950s he presented the popular BBC television series, 'Painting for Housewives', and frequently broadcast on BBC radio and interviewed artists for BBC archives. During the late 1950s he also wrote exhibition reviews for ArtReview, then titled Art News and Review.

As a result of his teaching experience Levy began publishing on the techniques of art - Painter's progress (1954), Painting for All (1958), Drawing and painting for young people (1961), The Human form in art (1961), The Moons of Paradise: some reflections on the appearance of the female breast in art (1962), A Dictionary of Art Terms (1963), The artist and the nude: an anthology of drawings (1965), and Drawing and sculpture (1970). His interest in Art Nouveau led to the publication of his Liberty Style: the classic years 1898-1910 (1986).

However, he became increasingly interested in particular artists, and in the course of a distinguished career as a critic he produced monographs on Drawings of L. S. Lowry (1963), The Paintings of D. H. Lawrence (1964), The Paintings of L.S. Lowry: oils and watercolours (1975), Whistler lithographs: an illustrated catalogue raisonne (1975), The Drawings of L. S. Lowry public and private (1976), and Carel Weight (1986). In 1968 he, with Pamela Hansford Johnson and Robert Lowell, contributed to Perry Miller Adato's documentary film, Dylan Thomas The World I Breathe. In addition he wrote contributions or introductions to exhibition catalogues and studies on several artists - Frans Baljon (1948), Eva Frankfurther (1962), Gaudier-Brzeska drawings and sculpture (1965), Horace Brodzky retrospective (1965), Scottie Wilson (1966), Clifford Hall (1967), Carel Weight (1972), John Bignell Chelsea photographer (1983), the (Ruth) Lambert Collection (1988), Ronald Ossory Dunlop (1989?), Rabuzin (1990) and Colin Moss (1996). In 1982 he published his autobiography, Reflections in a broken mirror.

His pencil portrait of LS Lowry (1961), is held at the Herbert Art Gallery and Museum, Coventry.

Levy worked as an interviewer and storyteller.

Levy married three times. He had two sons and one daughter, Maureen.

He died on 14 April 1996.

A portrait of Mervyn Levy by Alfred Janes (1935) is held by the Glynn Vivian Art Gallery, Swansea.

Mervyn Levy's niece is the artist, Isa Levy.

== Select Writings ==
- Painting for All (1958)
- The Paintings of L. S. Lowry (1975)
- Whistler Lithographs: An Illustrated Catalogue Raisonné (1975)
- The Drawings of L. S. Lowry (1976)
