= Charles Fisher (poet) =

Welsh journalist, writer, poet and adventurer

Charles Fisher (21 November 1914 – 23 January 2006) was a Welsh journalist, writer, poet and adventurer. Until 1953 he was based in Britain; afterwards, in Canada.

He was the last surviving member of the Kardomah group, a literary and artistic circle in Swansea circa 1930, which included Dylan Thomas, Vernon Watkins and Daniel Jones.

== Life and career ==
Fisher was born in Swansea. He was educated at the Bishop Gore School, Swansea, where he acted with the young Dylan Thomas in Galsworthy's Strife. He and Thomas were both taught English by Thomas's father, D.J. Thomas.

After school he and Thomas both become journalists for the South Wales Evening Post, where Fisher's father was head printer. Charles was a keen rider and fisherman, and wrote a column for the paper on angling, 'Blue Dun'. A handsome young man, he used the contacts which the newspaper gave him, to enjoy a busy social life. At that period Fisher collaborated with Dylan Thomas on early drafts of the spoof thriller, 'The King's Canary'; which was completed by Thomas and John Davenport, but not published until 1976. He and Thomas would meet at the Kardomah cafe, with other aspiring young artists, among them Vernon Watkins, Daniel Jones, John Prichard, Mabey Owen and Keidrych Rhys.

During World War II Fisher was an operative for British Intelligence. He saw active service in France.

After the War Fisher wrote for Reuters, the South Wales Evening Post and the BBC. He was a Reuter's correspondent at the British Parliament. His poems of this period were published, like those of Dylan Thomas and Vernon Watkins, in Keidrych Rhys's magazine, Wales (which had begun publication in 1937). In London Fisher became an admirer of Eartha Kitt. He was briefly married to the Spanish opera singer, Isabel Elana Alonzo, but they were divorced before 1953.

In 1953, after attending Dylan Thomas's funeral at Laugharne, Fisher emigrated to Canada, where he became a Hansard reporter in the House of Commons of Canada. Fisher used his long vacations to travel widely – at first in Spain, where he became friendly with the Romani people at Granada and became an accomplished player of flamenco guitar; afterwards in Mexico, Morocco, India and east Asia.

In 1963 he married Jane Edwards, with whom he had one daughter, Caitlin. He and Jane had a house on Elgin Street, in Ottawa, Canada, famous in the 1960s and 70s for its vibrant company. He and Jane were later divorced, but remained friends.

After retirement he lived in Almonte, Ontario.

In the 80's and 90's he became a friend of Canadian experimental composer and artist, Oool Fjolkunnigr. The two collaborated in musical compositions, an improvised musical group, Rotton Kidz, and other artistic projects and, for a brief time when he was well in his 80s, the frontman for the Bangkok-based, garbage kids Thai world rock band 'Ugly Orchestra of the Seven Goblin Girls', known for such hits as Beggars on Parade. During this period he traveled extensively in the Tonga Islands, Thailand and India.

His book of poems, The Locust Years, was published in 1988.

In 2003 he visited Swansea, to take part in the festival at the Dylan Thomas Centre commemorating the 50th anniversary of Dylan Thomas's death.

Shortly before his death he completed his memoir, Adios Granada, about his life with Romani people in Sacremonte, Spain, in the 1950s and 1960s.

Charles Fisher died in Bangkok, aged 91. His body was cremated at a local temple, and his ashes were sent home to Canada. He was survived by his ex-wife, Jane, his daughter, pioneering experimental digital writer Caitlin Fisher, his two granddaughters, and an extended family including brother-in-law Wallace Edwards, the celebrated Canadian children's author.
