= Transformed cladistics =

Transformed cladistics, also known as pattern cladistics, is an epistemological approach to the cladistic method of phylogenetic inference and classification that makes no a priori assumptions about common ancestry. It was advocated by Norman Platnick, Colin Patterson, Ronald Brady and others in the 1980s, but has few modern proponents. The book, Foundations of Systematics and Biogeography by David Williams and Malte Ebach provides a thoughtful history of the origins of this point of view.

== Patterns vs. processes ==
The traditional approach to cladistics, which traces back to Willi Hennig, groups together organisms based on whether or not they share derived characters or character states that are assumed to be descended from a common ancestor. Transformed cladists maintain that the assumption of common descent is uninformative and/or potentially misleading, and that therefore cladistic methods should be free from evolutionary process assumptions, and based only on parsimonious interpretation of empirical data:

"If classifications (that is, our knowledge of patterns) are ever to provide an adequate test of theories of evolutionary processes their construction must be independent of any particular theory of process." (Platnick, 1979)

In other words, pattern cladists argue that the fewer evolutionary assumptions a classification presupposes, the fewer errors creep in, and greater transparency results. They draw a distinction between patterns, which are observed, and processes, which may be inferred from patterns, but which should not be presupposed. Before the emergence of cladistics as a school, Joseph Henry Woodger criticized phylogenetic systematics on the grounds that homology by way of common ancestry is "putting the cart before the horse, because descent from a common ancestor is something assumed, not observed. It belongs to theory, whereas morphological correspondence is observed.". Colin Patterson later wrote similarly:

"We must remember the distinction between the cart--the explanation--and the horse--the data. And where models are introduced in phylogenetic reconstruction, we should prefer models dictated by features of the data to models derived from explanatory theories."

Pattern cladists, like traditional cladists, think that classifications should be isomorphic to cladograms, recognizing groups based on nested patterns of synapomorphies, but they argue that the discovery of characters is not dependent on apriori considerations about common ancestry:

"[T]o state a cladogram is a synapomorphy scheme invites the rejoinder that a cladogram must, therefore be a phyletic concept. Not so, for by ‘synapomorphy’ we mean ‘defining character’ of an inclusive taxon."

Nelson & Platnick (1981) also noted that: "all of Hennig’s groups correspond by definition to patterns of synapomorphy. Indeed, Hennig’s trees are frequently called synapomorphy schemes. The concept of ‘patterns within patterns’ seems, therefore, an empirical generalization.” Pattern cladists hence regard synapomorphies to be patterns free of processes.

== Criticism ==
A frequent (but false) accusation against pattern cladistics is that its proponents claim that systematics should be "theory free." At some point in the 1960s and '70s pheneticists may have believed that, but pattern cladists are not pheneticists. Obviously, rejecting a priori evolutionary process theories is not the same thing as categorically rejecting "theory" in toto. Furthermore, pattern cladists do not reject post hoc evolutionary explanations for cladograms, they simply think that the evidence is independent of the explanation. Nevertheless, some philosophers with a background conciliatory towards evolutionary taxonomy continue to offer criticisms in this vein:

"Pattern cladistics has remained on the fringe because of, first, its implausible assumption that there can be pure observation untainted by theory; and second, its rejection of the evolution assumption. Few systematists now think that a classification not based on evolutionary branching and history has any real signification or justification. The developing consensus is that Darwin was right – a natural classification must be genealogical."

Of course, the distinction between the phenomenon and its explanation was clear to Darwin: "the grand fact in natural history of the subordination of group under group, which from its familiarity, does not always sufficiently strike us, is in my judgment fully explained." But, "“we have no written pedigrees; we have to make out community of descent by resemblances of any kind." For pattern cladists, it is not just "any kind" of resemblance, but synapomorphy, that reveals community of descent.

Brady introduced to systematics the terms explanandum for empirical patterns (the phenomenon to be explained) and explanans for process theory (the explanation), writing: "by making our explanation into the definition of the condition [data] to be explained, we express not scientific hypothesis but belief". In the above quote, Darwin's "fact" is the explanandum; his theory of descent with modification is the explanans.

In this view, whatever the characters imply as the preferred hypothesis of relationships becomes, de facto, "genealogical" when we explain it as a result of evolution.

== Creationist distortion ==
As noted, transformed cladistics does not deny common ancestry, rather it argues a logical precedence: theories regarding processes should only be formulated after patterns are discovered. Creationists have distorted this to argue that there are pattern cladists who are skeptical about whether evolution occurs.

=== Colin Patterson ===
In November, 1981, Patterson delivered a seminar to the Systematics Discussion Group in the American Museum of Natural History. In the talk, Patterson asked provocatively: "Can you tell me anything about evolution, any one thing that is true?", and remarked:

"As I understand it, cladistics is theoretically neutral so far as evolution is concerned. It has nothing to say about evolution. You don’t need to know about evolution, or believe in it, to do cladistic analysis. All that cladistics demands is that groups have characters."

A creationist in the audience taped segments of Patterson's talk to imply he was "agnostic" on the subject of evolution. To his dismay, Patterson soon found his name quoted in creationist publications:

"I was too naive and foolish to guess what might happen: the talk was taped by a creationist who passed the tape to Luther Sunderland [...] Since, in my view, the tape was obtained unethically, I asked Sunderland to stop circulating the transcript, but of course to no effect. There is not much point in my going through the article point by point. I was putting a case for discussion, as I thought off the record, and was speaking only about systematics, a specialized field. I do not support the creationist movement in any way, and in particular I am opposed to their efforts to modify school curricula. In short the article does not fairly represent my views. But even if it did, so what? The issue should be resolved by rational discussion, and not by quoting 'authorities,' which seems to be the creationists' principal mode of argument." (Letter from Colin Patterson to Steven W. Binkley, June 17, 1982)

"Unfortunately, and unknown to me, there was a creationist in my audience with a hidden tape recorder. A transcript of my talk was produced and circulated among creationists, and the talk has since been widely, and often inaccurately, quoted in creationist literature." (Patterson, 1994)

(Note that a transcript of Patterson's talk has been published in the Linnean 18(2), and may be downloaded from the Linnean Society).

"Because creationists lack scientific research to support such theories as a young earth ... a world-wide flood ... or separate ancestry for humans and apes, their common tactic is to attack evolution by hunting out debate or dissent among evolutionary biologists. ... I learned that one should think carefully about candour in argument (in publications, lectures, or correspondence) in case one was furnishing creationist campaigners with ammunition in the form of 'quotable quotes', often taken out of context."

== Modern proponents ==
A notable contemporary pattern cladist is Andrew V. Z. Brower.

== Additional references ==
- Nelson, G. (1985). "Outgroups and ontogeny". Cladistics. 1(1): 29–45.
- Nelson, G. (1989). "Cladistics and evolutionary models". Cladistics. 5(3): 275–289.
- Patterson, C. (1980). "Cladistics". The Biologist. 27: 234–240.
- Patterson, C. (1980). "Phylogenies and Fossils". Systematic Zoology. 29: 216–219.
- Patterson, C. (1981). "Significance of Fossils in Determining Evolutionary Relationships". Annual Review of Ecology and Systematics. 12: 195–223.
- Patterson, C. (1981). "The Goals, Uses, and Assumptions of Cladistic Analysis" presented to the Second Annual Meeting of the Willi Hennig Society, Ann Arbor, Michigan.
- Patterson, C. (1982). "Classes and cladists or individuals and evolution". Systematic Zoology. 31. 284–286.
- Patterson, C. (1982). "Morphological Characters and Homology". In: Problems of Phylogenetic Reconstruction. K.A. Joysey., A.E. Friday (eds.). Academic Press, 21–74.
- Patterson, C. (1983). "How does phylogeny differ from ontogeny?". In: Development and Evolution. B.C. Goodwin, N. Holder., C. Wylie (eds.). Cambridge University Press, 1-31.
- Patterson, C. (1988). "Homology in Classical and Molecular Biology". Molecular Biology and Evolution. 5: 603–625.
- Platnick, N. I. (1985). "Philosophy and the transformation of cladistics revisited". Cladistics. 1(1): 87–94.
- Platnick, N. I. (1982). "Defining characters and evolutionary groups". Systematic Zoology. 31: 282–284.
- Scott-Ram, N. R. (1990). Transformed cladistics, taxonomy and evolution. Cambridge University Press.
