= Colin Patterson (biologist) =

British palaeontologist

- Born: 13 October 1933; London
- Died: 9 March 1998 (aged 64); London
- Occupation: Palaeontologist
- Parent(s): Maurice W. Patterson (father); Norah J. Patterson (mother)
- Awards: Romer-Simpson Medal; Linnean Medal

Colin Patterson FRS (1933–1998), was a British palaeontologist at the Natural History Museum in London from 1962 to his official retirement in 1993 who specialised in fossil fish and systematics, advocating the transformed cladistics school. Patterson's Gap, a fossil gap in fishes in the earliest part of the Cenozoic, was named after him.

== Education and early life ==
Colin Patterson was born on 13 October 1933 in Hammersmith, London, the son of Maurice William Patterson (1908–1991) and Norah Joan (née Elliott) (1907–1984).

After National Service in the Royal Engineers, Patterson studied zoology at Imperial College, London (1954–57). He undertook postgraduate research into fossil fishes at University College London and obtained a PhD in 1961.

== Career and research ==
Patterson was one of the architects of the cladistic revolution in the British Museum of Natural History in the 1970s. In addition to his many works on classification of fossil fishes, he authored a general textbook on evolution, Evolution, in 1978 (and a revised 2nd edition in 1999), and edited Molecules and Morphology in Evolution: Conflict or Compromise? (1987), a book on the use of molecular and morphological evidence for inferring phylogenies. He also wrote two classic papers on homology.

Patterson did not support creationism, but his work has been cited by creationists with claims that it provides evidence of the absence of transitional forms in the fossil record. In the second edition of Evolution (1999), Patterson stated that his remarks had been taken out of context:

Because creationists lack scientific research to support such theories as a young earth ... a world-wide flood ... or separate ancestry for humans and apes, their common tactic is to attack evolution by hunting out debate or dissent among evolutionary biologists. ... I learned that one should think carefully about candour in argument (in publications, lectures, or correspondence) in case one was furnishing creationist campaigners with ammunition in the form of 'quotable quotes', often taken out of context.

=== Awards and honours ===
- Elected a Fellow of the Royal Society (FRS) in 1993
- Romer-Simpson Medal of the Society of Vertebrate Paleontology, 1997
- Linnean Medal, 1998

== Personal life ==
In 1955, he married the artist Rachel Caridwen Richards (b. 1932), who was the elder daughter of the artists Ceri Richards and Frances Richards. They had two daughters, Sarah (b. 1959) and Jane (b. 1963).

He died in London of a heart attack on 9 March 1998.
