= Dunvant Male Choir =

Welsh choir

- Choir
- Also known as: Côr Meibion Dyfnant
- Founded: 1895
- Genre: Male Choral Singing
- Rehearsal space: Ebenezer Chapel, Dunvant, Swansea
- Website: https://www.dunvantchoir.wales/

Dunvant Male Choir (Welsh: Côr Meibion Dyfnant) is based in Dunvant, Swansea, Wales.

== History ==
The choir was founded in 1895, in the country traditionally known as the "land of song". Singing in harmony is synonymous with the Welsh choir and Wales has a history of using music as a primary form of communication.

The arrival of the railway in 1867 changed Dunvant and its surrounding villages forever. It allowed the development of the coal seams in the area, local quarries, brick works and an iron foundry. It attracted people to move into the village and with the spread of new housing, to triple the size of the village. The station master at Dunvant on the London and North Western Railway, Isaac Peters (station master 1880–1892), was a man of some musical talent and he stirred the musical interests of the village by leading a mixed choir at Siloam Chapel and using the station waiting room for rehearsals of the Killay and Dunvant united choir.

As the number of villagers grew so did the need for Dunvant to have its own chapel, and Ebenezer was built in 1872, expanded in 1882 and rebuilt in 1893, becoming the heart of the village.

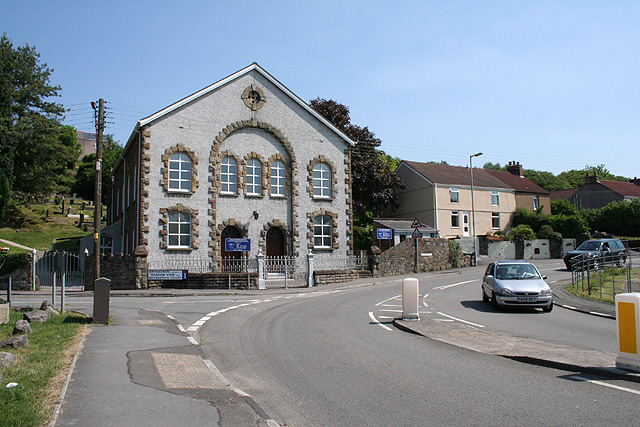
Ebenezer Chapel, Dunvant, where the choir was first established and still rehearses

As more villagers attended Ebenezer, David Evans of Three Crosses who had trained under Joseph Parry started a small male-only group at Ebenezer and also formed Gowerton Male Choir around 1890.

This was developed by Thomas Coslett Richards, father of the well-known Dunvant painter Ceri Richards, who drew male members of Ebenezer and other chapel choirs to form the Dunvant Ebenezer Excelsior Male Voice Choir in 1895 and laid the foundation for its success in local eisteddfods, taking 1st prize at the Gwyn Hall in Neath in 1901 and being presented with an oak chair that is in Ebenezer Chapel to this day.

The choir's 125th anniversary concert was postponed due to the 2020 COVID-19 pandemic, and was eventually held in April 2022 in the Brangwyn Hall, Swansea. The choir's activities during the pandemic were described in a BBC Radio Wales documentary called Still Singing: Dunvant Male Choir.

A statement to prospective members reads, “You do not have to be a trained singer or be able to read music, all you need is to enjoy singing and be willing to learn”.

== Discography ==
Albums

Release date	Title	Label and catalogue number
1979	"With A Voice of Singing"	EMI / Dunvant Male Choir CDBM2022
1980	"Harmony and Humour"	Dunvant Male Choir DUNCD06
1981	"Feast of Song" / "Gwledd o Gan"	Sain SCD 7013
1986	"The Power and the Glory"	Grasmere / Dunvant Male Choir CDBM560
1999	"There is a Land"	Black Mountain / Dunvant Male Choir CDBM4001
2001	"A Child Is Born"	C&A Ltd / Dunvant Male Choir DUNCD03
2003	"Moments In Time"	Dunvant Male Choir DUNCD01
2003	"You Make Me Feel So Young"	Dunvant Male Choir DUNCD02
2004	"Your Favourite Songs"	Dunvant Male Choir DUNCD04
2005	"Return To Gower"	Dunvant Male Choir DUNCD03
2007	"Remember The Voice"	Dunvant Male Choir DUNCD05
2011	"Brangwyn Memories"	Black Mountain / Dunvant Male Choir CDBM 3015
2012	"A Christmas Concert"	Dunvant Male Choir DUNCD07
2016	"Prince of the Apple Towns"	Dunvant Male Choir DUNCD08
2018	"For the Fallen"	Dunvant Male Choir DUNCD09

== Flash mobs ==
The choir is well-known for several flash mob performances at random locations around the City of Swansea and performed unannounced. The choir has performed in the Quadrant Shopping Centre, at Swansea Marina, on the seafront at Mumbles and in Swansea Market. and St David's Shopping Centre, Cardiff.

== Young Singer of the Year competition ==
The choir launched "The Welsh Musical Theatre Young Singer of the Year" competition in 2003, which has taken place every year except 2019 due to national COVID-19 lockdowns. The name changed in 2020 and the Young Singer competition was born. The competition supports young singers from the Swansea, Neath Port Talbot and Carmarthenshire areas and offers a cash prize and the chance to sing with the choir in a concert.

In 2005, Hayley Gallivan won the competition and went on to be an understudy for Elphaba in Wicked.

Connie Fisher won the competition in 2006. She then won the BBC One talent contest How Do You Solve a Problem Like Maria?, subsequently opening as Maria von Trapp in The Sound of Music in the West End of London.

Ben Joyce won in 2017 and went on to star as Frankie Valli in Jersey Boys in the Trafalgar Theatre in the West End of London. He more recently took on the lead role of Marty McFly in the West End production of Back to the Future at the Adelphi Theatre
