= Gwen Watkins =

British codebreaker and author (1923–2025)

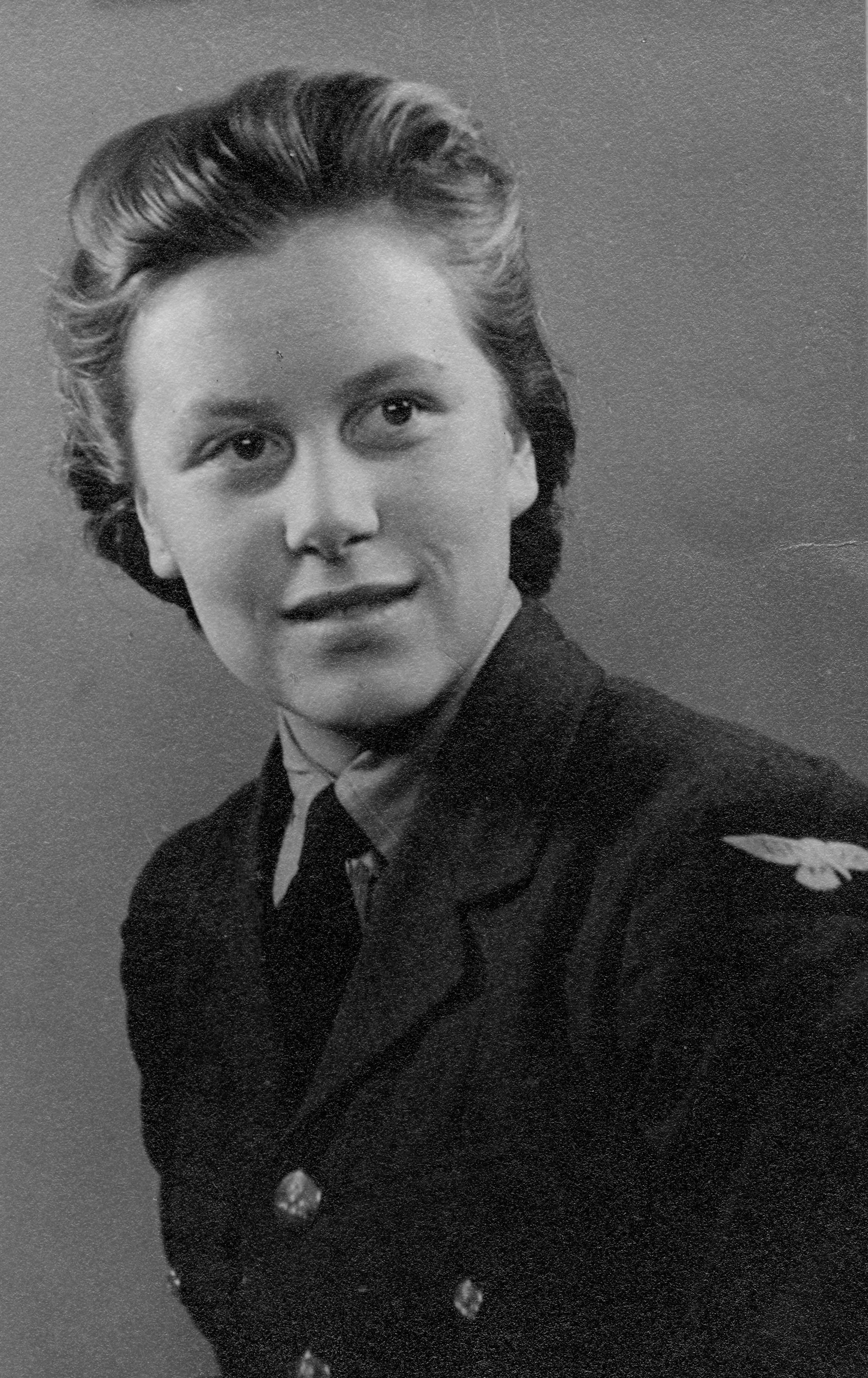
- in 1942
- Born: 31 December, 1923
- Died: 14 January, 2025

Gwendoline Mary Watkins (née Davies, 31 December 1923 – 14 January 2025) was a British codebreaker and author. During World War II, she worked at Bletchley Park de-coding traffic between German airfields.

== Biography ==
Gwendoline Mary Davies was born in West Bromwich to parents Alfred and Harriet. The family later moved to Bournemouth, where she attended Talbot Heath School.

While at Bletchley, she met the poet Vernon Watkins. They married in 1944 at St Bartholomew-the-Great. Dylan Thomas was supposed to be the best man at their wedding, but he failed to turn up.

They were both engaged in breaking the Luftwaffe AuKa tactical codes in Block F (A). Gwen was at first billeted at Stony Stratford but later moved to RAF Church Green at Bletchley. They were both Flight Sergeants and were stationed at Bletchley from June 1942 until May 1945.

One of their grandchildren, Marley Watkins, is a professional footballer who has represented the Welsh national team.

She was the author of several books, including Dylan Thomas: Portrait of a Friend (1983), Dickens in Search of Himself (1987), and Cracking the Luftwaffe Codes: The Secrets of Bletchley Park (2006).
