= Vernon Watkins =

Welsh poet (1906–1967)

- Watkins in July 1967
- Born: 27 June 1906; Maesteg, Glamorgan, Wales
- Died: 8 October 1967 (aged 61); Seattle, Washington, U.S.
- Resting place: St Mary's Church, Pennard, Gower, Wales
- Occupations: Poet, translator
- Spouse: Gwendoline Davies (m. 1944)
- Children: 5
- Relatives: Marley Watkins (grandson)
- Writing career
- Language: English
- Period: 1941–1967

Vernon Phillips Watkins (27 June 1906 – 8 October 1967) was a Welsh poet and translator. He was a close friend of fellow poet Dylan Thomas, who described him as "the most profound and greatly accomplished Welshman writing poems in English".

== Early life and studies ==
Vernon Watkins was born in Maesteg in Glamorgan, and brought up mainly in Swansea. His birth coincided with slight earth tremors; another baby born that night was christened John Earthquake Jones. His parents were William Watkins, a manager for Lloyds Bank in Wind Street, Swansea, and Sarah ("Sally"), daughter of James Phillips and Esther Thomas of Sarnau, Meidrim. James Phillips was a Congregationalist, reputed to know most of the Welsh Bible by heart. Sarah had a love of poetry and literature; her headmistress arranged for her to spend two years as a pupil-teacher in Germany. William Watkins and Sarah Phillips married in 1902, and had three children, Vernon, Marjorie, and Dorothy. The family lived at "Redclliffe", a large Victorian house about 4 miles (6.4 km) from Swansea, at Caswell Bay.

Watkins read fluently by the age of four, and at five announced that he would be a poet, although he did not wish to be published until after his death. He wrote poetry and read widely from eight or nine years of age and was especially fond of the works of John Keats and Shelley. He received his later education at a preparatory school in Sussex, Repton School in Derbyshire, and Magdalene College, Cambridge.

In his early years at Repton, Watkins' quiet, gentle character provoked regular bullying from older boys, though in his last years he attained more popularity as he was able to show capacity in tennis and cricket. After he died, in 1968, the school wrote that he was "perhaps the best poet Repton has had".^{[7]} His headmaster at Repton was Geoffrey Fisher, who became Archbishop of Canterbury. Despite his parents being Nonconformists, Watkins' school experiences influenced him to join the Church of England. He read modern languages at Cambridge, but left before completing his degree.

== Career ==
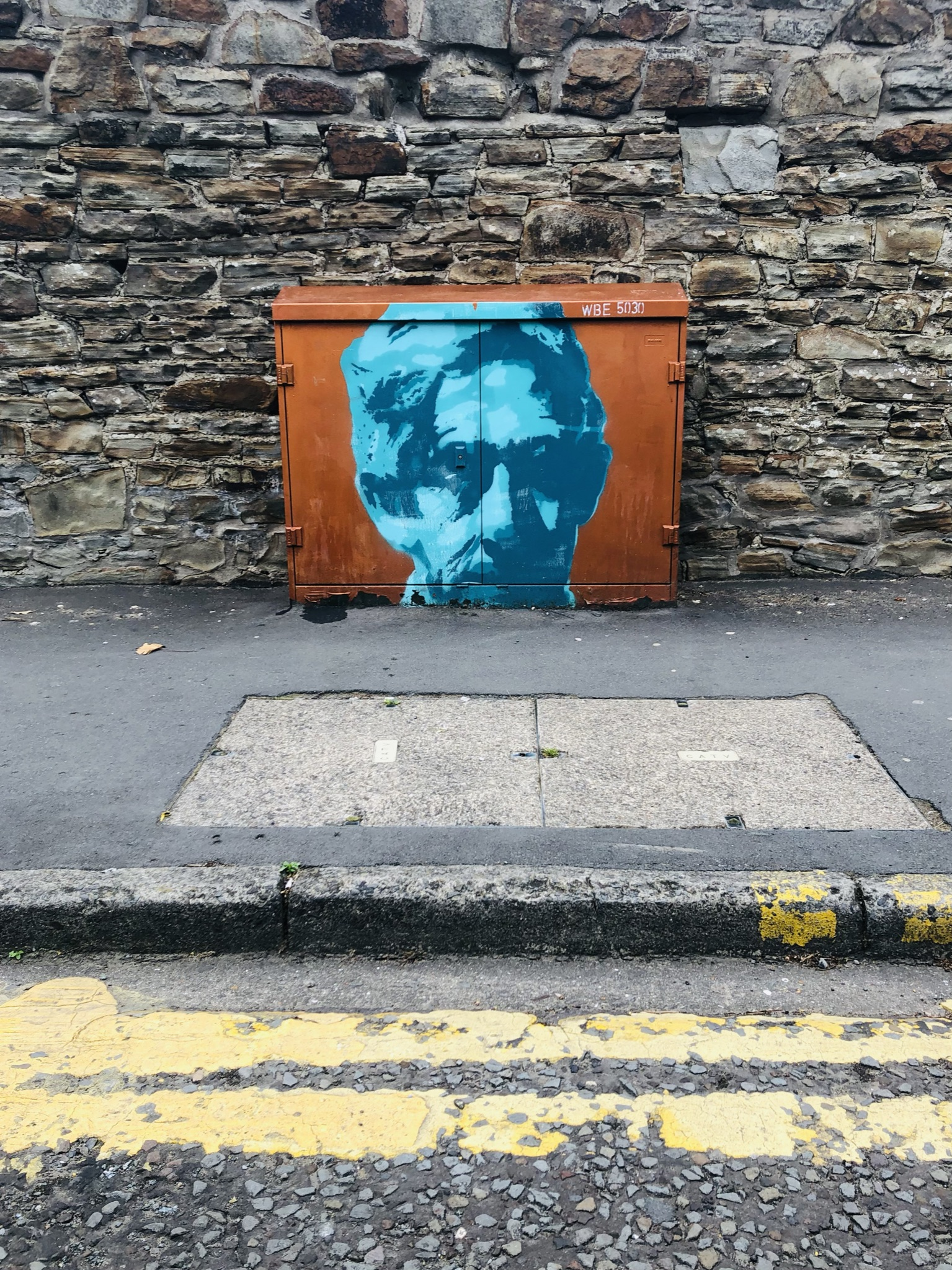
A depiction of Watkins painted onto an electric meter box in Swansea as part of a Dylan Thomas Trail.

=== Dylan Thomas and the Swansea Group ===
He met Dylan Thomas, who was to be a close friend, in 1935 when Watkins had returned to a job in a bank in Swansea. About once a week Thomas would come to Watkins' parents' house, situated on the very top of the cliffs of the Gower peninsula. Watkins was the only person from whom Thomas took advice when writing poetry and he was invariably the first to read his finished work. They remained lifelong friends, despite Thomas's failure, in the capacity of best man, to turn up to the wedding of Vernon and Gwen in 1944. Watkins was godfather to Thomas's son Llewelyn, the others being Richard Hughes and Augustus John.

Thomas used to laugh affectionately at his friend's gossamer-like personality and extreme sensibility. A story is told that one evening in Chelsea, during the war time blackout, they were walking along and Vernon tripped over something and fell to the ground. Thomas looked with a torch to see what the offending object was and to his delight all that they could find was a small, black feather (FitzGibbon 1966).

With Thomas, Watkins was one of a group of Swansea artists known as the "Kardomah boys" (because they frequented the Kardomah Café in Castle Street). Others among this Swansea Group were the composer Daniel Jenkyn Jones, writer Charles Fisher and the artists Alfred Janes and Mervyn Levy.

Letters to Vernon Watkins by Dylan Thomas was published in 1957, four years after his death in New York. It proved to be the first in a number of books that linked Watkins and Thomas. The 1983 book Portrait of a Friend by Watkins' wife Gwen (née Davies) deals with the relationship between the two poets, and in 2013 Parthian Books published Vernon Watkins on Dylan Thomas and Other Poets & Poetry, a collection of previously unpublished critical work with a foreword by Rowan Williams. Poems for Dylan, a collection of poems written by Watkins to Thomas, appeared from Gomer Press in 2003. It opens with the obituary Watkins wrote for his friend, which was originally published in The Times on 10 November 1953. Poems for Dylan also contains two poems ('At Cwmrhydyceirw Quarry' and 'Cwmrhydyceirw Elegiacs') centred upon the quarry in Cwmrhydyceirw where, in August 1963, Watkins and the sculptor Ron Cour picked out the stone that would be inscribed with lines from 'Fern Hill' and placed in Cwmdonkin Park as a permanent memorial to Thomas. 'Cwmrhydyceirw Elegiacs' had first seen publication in the January 1968 issue of Poetry magazine.

=== Bletchley Park and marriage ===
Watkins met Gwen, who came from Harborne, Birmingham, at Bletchley Park, where he worked during the Second World War as a cryptographer, and she, as a member of the WAAF. They were both engaged in breaking the Luftwaffe AuKa tactical codes in Block F (A). Gwen was at first billeted at Stony Stratford but later moved to RAF Church Green at Bletchley. They were both Flight Sergeants and were stationed at Bletchley from June 1942 until May 1945.

They were married at the church of St Bartholomew-the-Great, in London on 2 October 1944. The couple had five children. One of their grandchildren, Marley Watkins, is a professional footballer who has represented the Welsh national team.

== Poetry ==
Watkins' ambitions were for his poetry; in critical terms they were not to be fulfilled. On the other hand, he became a major figure for the Anglo-Welsh poetry tradition, and his poems were included in major anthologies. During the war he was for a time associated with the New Apocalyptics group. With his first book Ballad of the Mari Llwyd (1941) accepted by Faber & Faber, he had a publisher with a policy of sticking by their authors. In his case this may be considered to have had an adverse long-term effect on his reputation, in that it is sometimes thought that he over-published. Of the book, the publisher said:

"Mr Vernon Watkins is a Welsh poet whose work hitherto has appeared only in periodicals and in recent anthologies. The only influence apparent upon his poetry is one he has thoroughly assimilated - that of W. B. Yeats. Otherwise his style differs radically from that of any of his older contemporaries, except for a racial quality which gives it something in common with that of Dylan Thomas. Mr Watkins is undoubtedly a poet with an uncommon sense of rhythm as well as of imagery."

The British Library holds a manuscript draft of the poem with annotations by T. S. Eliot, showing Eliot at work as editor and board member at the publishing house Faber - his "day job" since 1925. The Library also holds the Watkins Papers which include autograph and typewritten poems chiefly from his seven published volumes, but also some unpublished poems. In 2016, another collection of Watkins's draft poems was acquired from the widow of Watkins.

Watkins wrote poetry for several hours every night and by way of contrast, Caitlin, Dylan Thomas's wife, could not recall her husband staying in even for one night during their whole married life. As well as Yeats Vernon was familiar with T. S. Eliot and Philip Larkin whose affectionate recollection of him can be found in his Required Writing: Miscellaneous Pieces 1955-1982 (2012). He was awarded a University of Wales honorary Doctorate of Literature in 1966 after retiring from his job at the bank. He was being considered for Poet Laureate at the time of his death.

That July morning when the poet's widow
Stayed here, at breakfast looking through the window
We saw young rabbits leap, and in a pother
Frisk, dance and scurry, dodging one another,
Returning always to the selfsame corner
Between low beech-trees and the grassy border.
They scattered when my children running out
Found a young Redpoll injured on the ground.
This sacrifice had made the rabbits dance.
It had fallen from the fuchsia bush or branch
Of beech that shook down dewdrops on my head.
I for a moment thought the brilliant red
Of breast and crest had come from a hawk's wound,
But found no blood. The heart beat faintly. Soon
We had laid it in a box, propped upon silk.
I touched the twig-like leg. White bread and milk
We gave it, but the beak at once refused,
After one drop, to drink, and the eyes closed.
It woke when my warm hand, encircling, took it,
Straining to perch; but whether claw was crooked
Or the wing hurt, it could not fly or stand.
We left it where life's ember might be fanned
By sunlight through a window. It revived
A little. But the warmth on which it lived
Diminished then, in the late afternoon.
It was so small, so quiet in my room,
That when I turned to lift it from the sill
And feel its weight upon my fingers, still
I counted to awaken it, nor saw
What breath had chilled the feathers, gripped the claw;
Nor did the dainty bird with that red stain
Seem dead at all, until I looked again.

Watkins, The Redpoll, a later poem, never fully revised.

A poem by Watkins from The Anglo-Welsh Review; the widow mentioned may be Caitlin Thomas.

== Death and memorial ==
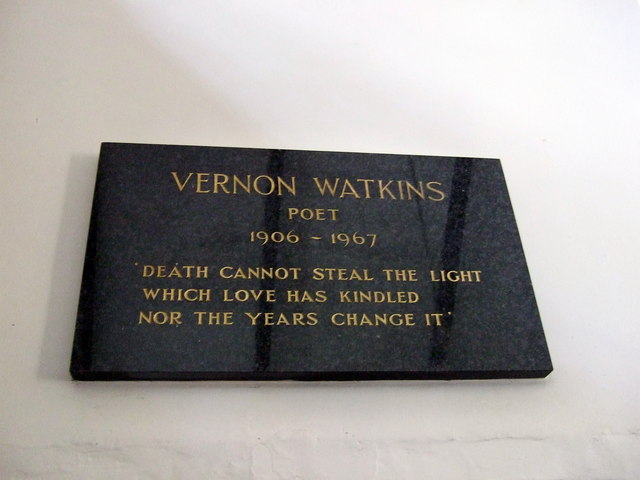
Memorial plaque at St Mary's Church, Pennard, Glamorgan

Watkins had developed a serious heart condition, which he made light of, insisting on playing his beloved tennis and squash with his usual vigour. He died on 8 October 1967, aged 61, playing tennis in Seattle, where he had gone to teach a course on modern poetry at the University of Washington. Philip Larkin wrote his obituary.

His body was returned to Britain, and was buried in Gower, at St Mary's Church, Pennard. A small granite memorial to him stands at Hunt's Bay, Gower, on which are inscribed two lines from his poem "Taliesin in Gower": "I have been taught the script of stones, and I know the tongue of the wave."

A portrait of Watkins by his friend Alfred Janes may be seen in the Glynn Vivian Art Gallery, Swansea. A group portrait of the Kardomah Boys by Jeff Phillips was unveiled at Tapestri Arts Centre in Swansea in June 2011. Featured in the painting are Vernon Watkins, John Pritchard, Dylan Thomas, Daniel Jones and Alfred Janes. The picture is based on a BBC Radio Times front cover from October 1949.

In March 2012, Rowan Williams, Archbishop of Canterbury, presented a portrait of Watkins in the BBC Radio 3 programme Swansea's Other Poet. Williams regards Watkins as "one of the 20th century's most brilliant and distinctive yet unjustly neglected voices".

In October 2014 Swansea Council unveiled a blue plaque for Watkins outside the building on the corner of St Helen's Road and Beach Street in the city, where he spent 38 years working for Lloyds Bank. On 3 November 2014 the "Poem of the Week" in The Guardian was Watkins' "Three Harps".

Most of Watkins's manuscripts are held by the National Library of Wales, Aberystwyth.

== Published works ==
- The Ballad of the Mari Lwyd and other poems (1941).Faber & Faber
- The Lamp and the Veil (1945). Faber & Faber
- The Lady with the Unicorn (1948). Faber & Faber
- The Death Bell (1954). Faber & Faber.
- The North Sea (1955) New Directions - verse translation by Watkins from Heinrich Heine
- Cypress and Acacia (1959). New Directions
- Affinities (1962). New Directions
- Fidelities (1968). Faber & Faber
- Uncollected Poems (1969). Enitharmon Press, limited edition.
- Vernon Watkins Selected Verse Translations with an Essay on the Translation of Poetry (1977)
- The Ballad of the Outer Dark and Other Poems (1979). Enitharmon Press.
- The Breaking of the Wave (1979). Golgonooza Press
- The Collected Poems of Vernon Watkins (1986) - reprinted in paperback 2000 and 2005 Golgonooza Press ISBN 0-903880-73-3
- LMNTRE Poems by Vernon Watkins Illustrated by Alan Perry (1999). Ty Llen Publications - chiefly poems for children
- Taliesin and the Mockers with images by Glenys Cour (2004, Old Stile Press)
- Vernon Watkins: New Selected Poems. Edited by Richard Ramsbotham (2006) Carcanet Press. ISBN 1-85754-847-7
- Four Unpublished Poems by Vernon Watkins in The Anglo-Welsh Review; vol. 22 no. 50, pp 65–69.
