= Haydn Mainwaring =

- Full name: Haydn James Mainwaring
- Born: 10 June 1933 Swansea, Wales
- Died: 12 September 2018 (aged 85)
- School: Bishop Gore School

Rugby union career
- Position: Centre
International career
Years	Team	Apps	(Points)
1961	Wales	1	(0)

Haydn James Mainwaring (10 June 1933 — 12 September 2018) was a Welsh international rugby union player.

Mainwaring was born in Swansea and educated at Bishop Gore School.

A versatile back, Mainwaring played with Swansea, Royal Navy, London Welsh, Harlequins and Newport. He also made several Barbarians appearances, mostly famously as a fullback against the touring 1961 Springboks, with his try-saving shoulder charge on Avril Malan helping secure a 6–0 win. His tackle was described in the press as "like a comet burying itself into earth". He won his solitary Wales cap as a centre in a 1961 Five Nations match against France in Paris.

== See also ==
- List of Wales national rugby union players
