= Ceri Richards =

Welsh painter (1903–1971)

- Ceri Richards in 1960
- Born: 6 June 1903; Dunvant, Wales
- Died: 9 November 1971 (aged 68); London, England
- Education: Swansea School of Art; Royal College of Art
- Known for: Painting; printmaking; reliefs
- Movement: Modernism
- Spouse: Frances Clayton (married 1929)
- Awards: CBE (1960); National Eisteddfod Gold Medal (1961); Einaudi Painting Prize of the Venice Biennale (1962).

Ceri Giraldus Richards CBE (6 June 1903 – 9 November 1971) was a Welsh painter, print-maker and maker of reliefs.

== Biography ==
Richards was born in 1903 in the village of Dunvant, near Swansea, the son of Thomas Coslett Richards and Sarah Richards (born Jones). He and his younger brother and sister, Owen and Esther, were brought up in a highly cultured, working-class environment. His mother came from a family of craftsmen; his father, an employee of a tinplate foundry in Gowerton, was active in the local chapel and wrote poetry in Welsh and English. For many years he conducted the Dunvant Excelsior Male Voice Choir, which would become the Dunvant Male Choir. All three children were taught to play the piano, and became familiar with the works of Bach and Handel in the cycle of Christian celebration. In later years music would be an important stimulus to Richards's painting – as would his youthful sensitivity to the landscapes of the Gower Peninsula and the cycles of nature.

At Gowerton Intermediate School he drew constantly and won local competitions. When he left school to become apprenticed to a firm of electricians in Swansea, he devoted his evenings to studying engineering draughtsmanship at Swansea College of Technology and drawing at the Swansea School of Art (both are now part of University of Wales Trinity Saint David).

In 1921, at the age of 18, Richards enrolled full-time at the Swansea School of Art, then under the direction of William Grant Murray. During his time at the art school he spent less time in painting than in drawing from classical casts and studying industrial design and graphics. The strongest impact on him during these years appears to have been the week's summer school in 1923, which he spent under the direction of Hugh Blaker at Gregynog Hall, the country house of Gwendoline and Margaret Davies, where he first saw the canvases of Renoir, Van Gogh, Monet, Cézanne, Corot and Daumier, the sculpture of Rodin and sheets of old-master and modern drawings. The experience confirmed him in his vocation; and in the same year he applied for, and won, a scholarship to study in London at the Royal College of Art.

Richards entered the Royal College of Art in 1924.

Afterwards Richards spent most of his life in London, apart from a period teaching art in Cardiff, where he was head of painting at Cardiff School of Art during World War II.

In 1929 he married Frances Clayton, a fellow artist. They had two daughters – Rachel (born 1932) and Rhiannon (born 1945). Rachel married the paleontologist Colin Patterson.

His work gradually moved towards surrealism after exposure to the work of Picasso and Kandinsky. He was also a talented musician, and music is a theme for much of his artwork. From 1959 onwards, he made prints for the Curwen Press. One of the high points of his career was the Venice Biennale of 1962, where he was a prizewinner.

In the 1940s Richards began a career-long engagement with the work of his compatriot Dylan Thomas, creating works of art inspired by his poetry. These include three paintings collectively entitled, from the poem of the same name, The force that through the green fuse drives the flower, which he later reworked into lithographs and published in 1947. After Thomas’s death in 1953, Richards produced a series of works under the rubric Homage to Dylan Thomas. In 1965 he created Twelve Lithographs for Dylan Thomas.

Richards died in London on 9 November 1971. He was buried, with his parents, in the churchyard of Ebenezer Chapel in Dunvant, not far from where he was born.

Many of his works are in the Tate Britain collection. The Glynn Vivian Art Gallery in Swansea (where Richards' first solo exhibition took place in 1930) also holds a collection. Good examples of his work are also to be found in the gallery of the National Museum Cardiff and the Pallant House Gallery, Chichester.

He designed stained glass windows for Derby Cathedral (1964–65), and for the Blessed Sacrament Chapel of Liverpool Metropolitan Cathedral (1965).

== Select works ==
- Still Life with Music (1933)
- The Sculptor and his Object (1934)
- The Sculptor in his Studio (1937)
- The Female Contains All Qualities (1937)
- Blossoms (1940)
- The Coster Woman (1943)
- The force that through the green fuse drives the flower (three lithographs) (1947)
- The Pianist (1948)
- Interior with piano, woman and child painting (1949)
- Trafalgar Square (1951)
- Black Apple of Gower (1952)
- Beethoven and St Cecilia (1953)
- Do not go gentle into that good night (1956) [2 versions]
- Deposition (1958)
- The Supper at Emmaus (1958), St. Edmund Hall chapel
- La Cathédrale engloutie (The 1957–1962) [series]
- Poissons d'or (1963)
- Twelve Lithographs for Dylan Thomas (1965)
- Claire de lune (1967)
- White Blossom (1968)
- Elegy for Vernon Watkins (1971)
- Murals for the British Council offices, 46 Caroline Street, Cardiff
