= Hywel Davies (doctor) =

David Hywel Davies (16 August 1924 – December 2016) was a Welsh cardiologist and writer. He wrote extensively on a range of medical and scientific subjects.

== Career ==
Born in Swansea, Wales in 1924, Davies attended Swansea Grammar School (now known as Bishop Gore School) and gained a Meyricke Exhibition in chemistry at Jesus College, Oxford. He interrupted his studies in 1943 to join the Royal Engineers, in which regiment he was commissioned and served in Italy, India and Malaya. Upon returning to Oxford in 1946, he changed his degree and started reading medicine. Davies undertook his clinical studies at Westminster Hospital, London, where he gained the Sturges Prize in clinical medicine and a BMA prize for his essay on Clinical Teaching in Relation to the Practice of Medicine. He qualified BM, BCh in 1952.

After various appointments in paediatrics and general medicine, Davies specialised in cardiology and took up a residency at the University of Colorado Medical Center in Denver. After a year he was appointed by Dr Paul Wood as registrar at the National Heart Hospital and Institute of Cardiology in London. Subsequently he was senior registrar and senior lecturer at Guy's Hospital and was awarded the Carey-Coombs prize of the University of Bristol. Dr Davies graduated with a D.Phil. from Jesus College, Oxford in 1965 with a thesis entitled Respiratory disturbances in congenital heart disease. In 1967 he was invited to join the faculty of the University of Colorado, Denver, and was Chief of Cardiology at the VA Hospital in Denver .

== Personal life ==
Davies married his wife Lucette in 1955. The couple had one daughter, who lives in London. Dr Davies lived in Sion, Switzerland and devoted most of his time to writing. He died in December 2016.

== Medical interests ==
=== The Hywel Davies chest deformity ===
Dr Davies gave the first comprehensive description in 1959 of the chest deformities which accompany congenital heart disease and their relationship to disturbed lung function. The typical barrel-shaped deformity accompanying the large ventricular septal defect was called the "Hywel Davies chest deformity" by Dr Paul Wood and was known as such for some years, and as the "Thorax of Davies" on the continent . He showed that it was the result of increased stiffness of the lungs due to high flow and pressure of blood in them. These observations of the relationship of the circulation to lung function were followed by a more general study of the causes of breathlessness in heart disease, which led to a series of papers in the 1960s and 70's analysing the interplay of chemical changes in the blood (acidity, oxygenation and carbon dioxide level), mechanical factors in the control of breathing in various forms of heart disease as well as in normal people. He was associated closely in those years with active and pioneering cardiac surgical programmes (Drs Henry Swan, George Pappas and Thomas Starzl in Denver, Sir Russell Brock and Mr Donald Ross at Guy's Hospital).

=== Cholesterol, heart disease and modern medicine ===
In the 1970s and 80's Dr. Davies became increasingly interested in coronary artery disease and its causes, for that now constituted the majority of his practice. He believes that medicine took a wrong turning when it elected to devote the bulk of its resources to studying cholesterol and to largely inconclusive clinical trials based on flawed statistical manipulation. He did not accept that elevated cholesterol levels were the main cause of coronary disease, nor that eating margarine or not eating eggs would have any beneficial effects. He emphasised that the beginnings of coronary disease could occur in childhood and that the first changes consisted of undue multiplication of cells in the inner lining of the coronary arteries, and that these had little to do with fats and cholesterol. He was given the opportunity to study these further in an accelerated human form when he was asked by Mr (now Sir) Terence English to join him at Papworth Hospital, where he worked from 1986 to 1988 as consultant cardiologist to the heart transplant programme.

=== Vitamin D ===
During these years he became increasingly interested in the role of ionic calcium in the control of cell division, and the environmental causes of disturbance of calcium metabolism, especially excessive intakes of calcium, vitamin D and phosphorus. He has pointed out in recent publications such as "The Child, The Environment and Coronary Heart Disease", the subtle inter-relationships that exist in the genesis of coronary disease, including pre-natal influences, infant feeding patterns, and the particular role of calcium and inflammation. The failure to recognise these, he believes, has been responsible for the lack of real progress in the understanding of heart disease as well as cancer, which is also an aberration of cell multiplication. He is much opposed to current attempts, mostly by non-clinicians, to increase the intake of Vitamin D without any consideration of its deleterious cardiovascular effects, which he sees as unwise and even dangerous. His singular views have recently been expressed in a self-published monograph entitled "Vitamin D in Disarray" where he calls into serious question the existence of widespread Vitamin D deficiency as well as the associations claimed between geographic latitude and various diseases such as multiple sclerosis and cancer.

=== Homeopathy ===
In the chapter "New Year's Aspirations and Alternative Medicine" from Uncle Ebe and Other Stories, Davies asserts that much criticism of alternative medicine in general and homoeopathy in particular is faulty. He suggests that large scale statistical analysis of the benefits of such treatments are impossible because "in homeopathy each individual is treated as unique, and no two patients receive the same medications for the same complaint" and so "the number of factors involved the decision making becomes so great that statistical comparisons are worthless". He goes onto argue that many homoeopathic sceptics ignore evidence from the field of materials science, stating that "the assumption that great dilutions of active principles imply the ultimate absence of useful properties is intuitively reasonable but is only an assumption and is probably wrong".

=== Other views ===
Davies disagrees that global warming is the result of human activity and argues that the most pressing threat to humanity's future consists of pollution caused by the growth in the number of new chemical products that have found their way into the human food chain over the last half-century. Orthodox medical advice about diet has been wrong he believes, pointing to the increase in obesity and diabetes rates as evidence for this claim.

== Bibliography ==
Books

Modern Medicine, Abelard, London 1977

The Child, its Environment, and the Development of Coronary Arterial Disease, (in press)

Understanding Cardiology, (with W.P. Nelson), Butterworths, Boston and London 1978

Uncle Ebe and Other Stories, The Memoir Club, Durham 2010

Vitamin D in Disarray, self-published monograph, Sion 2010

Selected Articles

Ailward D, Davies DH, Hecker R : Effects of Venostasin on Serum Cholesterol Levels. Br Med J 1, 398, 1955.

Davies H : Chest Deformities in Congenital Heart Disease, Brit J Dis Chest 53, 151–155, 1959.

Davies H, Williams JV, Wood P : Lung Stiffness in States of Abnormal Pulmonary Blood Flow and Pressure, Brit Heart J 24, 129–138, 1962.

Davies H : "On the Therapy of Coronary Artery Disease" (Editorial). Am J Med Sci 258, 371–373, 1969

Davies H : Symptoms in Congenital Heart Disease : Factors in Their Genesis and the Surgeon's Role in Their Alleviation Guy's Hosp Rep 118, 129–157, 1969.

Davies H : Cerebral Blood Flow in Drugs and Cerebral Function Ed. WL Smith, CC Thomas, Springfield, 1970.

Davies H : Coronary heart disease : the significance of coronary pathology in infancy and the role of mitogens such as Vitamin D, Medical Hypotheses 1989; 30 : 179–185.
