= Hywel Davies (footballer) =

Welsh footballer

Personal information
- Date of birth: 20 November 1902
- Place of birth: Llanddulas, Wales
- Date of death: 16 August 1976 (aged 73)
- Place of death: Denbigh
- Position: Winger

Senior career*
Years	Team	Apps	(Gls)
1927–1928	Wrexham		

International career
1928	Wales	1	(0)
1928-1931	Wales Amateurs	5	
- * Club domestic league appearances and goals

Reverend Hywel Davies (20 November 1902 — 16 August 1976) was a Welsh international footballer. He was part of the Wales national football team, playing one match on 4 February 1928 against Ireland.

At club level, he played two seasons for Wrexham from 1927 to 1929. Previously, he played for Corinthians and became an Oxford Blue in football.

As well as a talented footballer, Davies was also a clergyman. Ordained in 1925 he was Curate of Wrexham until 1934 before becoming the Rectors of Brynford and later Denbigh.
