= Kardomah Cafés =

Chain of coffee shops

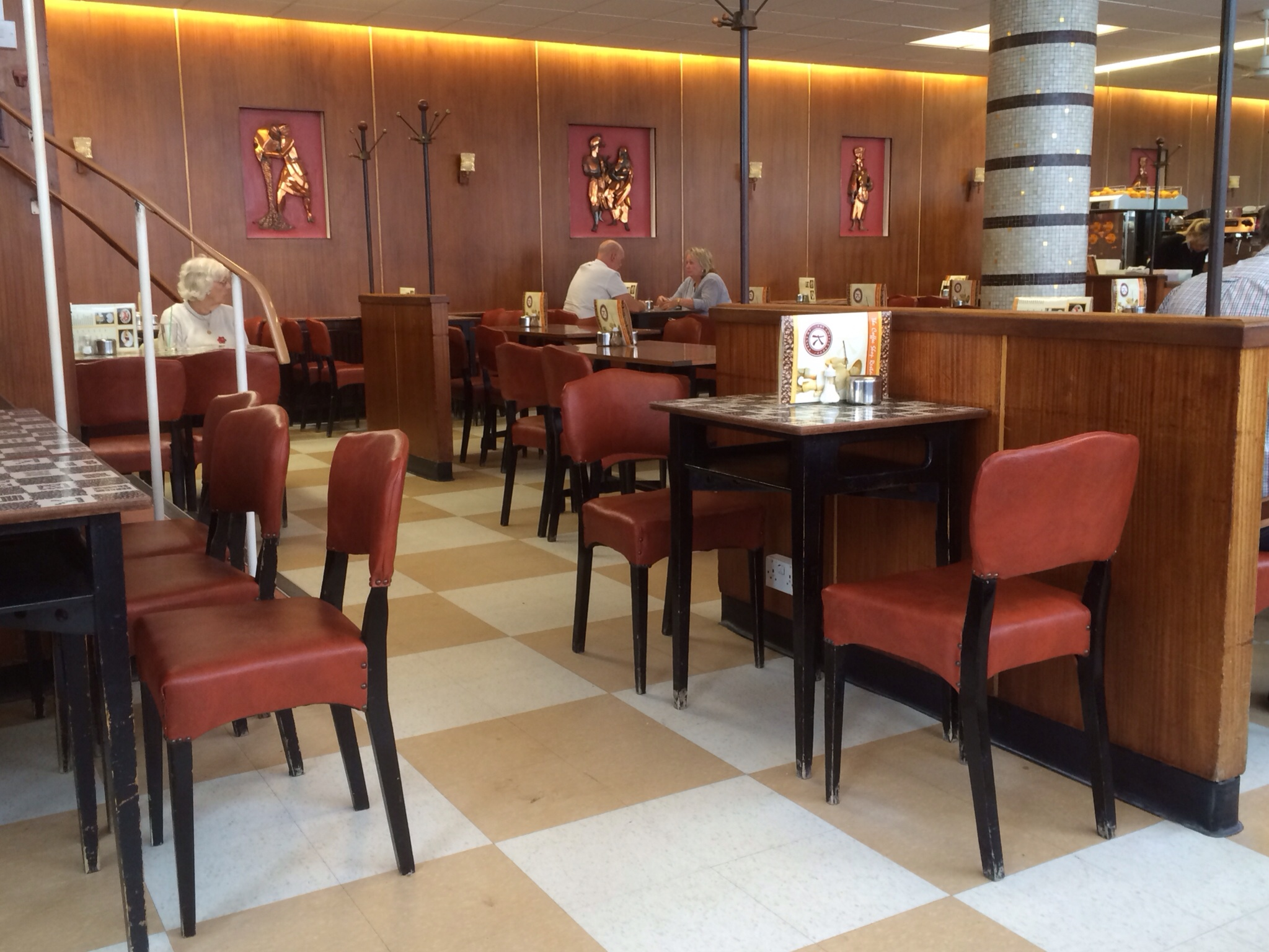
Kardomah in Swansea, 2016

Kardomah Cafés were a chain of coffee shops in England, Wales, and a few in Paris, popular from the early 1900s until the 1960s, but now almost defunct. They featured live entertainment provided by string quartets.

== History ==
The company that created the Kardomah brand began in Pudsey Street, Liverpool in 1844 as the Vey Brothers teadealers and grocers. In 1868 the business was acquired by the newly created Liverpool China and India Tea Company, and a series of brand names was created beginning with Mikado. The Kardomah brand of tea was first served at the Liverpool colonial exhibition of 1887, and the brand was later applied to a range of teas, coffees and coffee houses. The owner was renamed Kardomah Limited in 1938. The brand was acquired by the Forte Group in 1962, sold to Cadbury/Schweppes/Typhoo in 1971, and became part of Premier Brands some time between 1980 and 1997. The brand still exists, selling items such as instant coffee and coffee whitener.

The Kardomah Cafés in London and Manchester were designed by Sir Misha Black between 1936 and 1950.

The last remaining Kardomah cafe is in Swansea, South Wales. The original Swansea branch was at 232 High St, and known as 'The Kardomah Exhibition Cafe & Tea Rooms', moving to the Castle Street in 1908.{The Cambrian, 13th November 1908} The Castle Street cafe was the meeting place of The Kardomah Gang, which included Dylan Thomas, and was built on the site of the former Congregational Chapel where Thomas's parents were married in 1903. The cafe was bombed during WW2 (the Blitz of 19 to 21 February 1941) and was later replaced by the present Kardomah Coffee Shop Restaurant in Portland Street which was opened in 1957. It retains its original interior virtually untouched, including Formica tables with a design of coffee beans, sputnik style coat racks, mosaic tiled columns and dark wood panelling. The cafe has been run by the Luporini family since 1970 and remains a beloved Swansea institution.

== Other locations ==
- Birmingham (opposite Snow Hill Station, and New Street)
- Blackpool (Promenade)
- Cambridge (St Andrew's Street)
- Cardiff (Queen Street)
- Chester (Eastgate Street)
- Derby (Cornmarket), 1940s to 1980s
- Hull (Whitefriargate)
- Kingston upon Thames (Wood Street)
- Leeds (65 to 66 Briggate), 1908 to 1965
- Liverpool (30 Bold Street), (37 Castle Street), (21 Church Street), (42 Dale Street), (14 Redcross Street), (1-3 Rumford Place,) (corner of Whitechapel & Stanley Street)
- London (186 Piccadilly, Fleet Street, Southampton Row, Kingsway, Holborn)
- Manchester (Albert Square), 1950s
- Manchester (Market Street).
- Manchester (St Ann's Square).
- Nottingham (King Street)
- Oxford (Cornmarket Street)
- Paris (1 Rue de l'Échelle, corner of Rue de Rivoli)
- Preston (Fishergate), closed 1966
- Southport (Lord Street)
- Richmond (George Street) 1974-1982
- Windsor (Thames St, opposite the Curfew Tower)

== Kardomah-branded products ==
- Kardomah Kee-Mun Tea (fl.1936)
- Kardomah Tea-Tasting Cabinet (1952)
- Kardomah Products

== In popular culture ==
A branch in the fictional town of Milford is one of the meeting places used by Alec and Laura in the 1945 film Brief Encounter. It was created on a studio set.

Liverpool's Kardomah Cafe gained popularity for the 1983 song "Kardomah Cafe" by local group The Cherry Boys. This branch was also used by the Beatles, and the many Merseybeat groups of the 1960s, who played in the nearby Cavern Club.

The London Kardomah on Piccadilly features in several novels by the author Barbara Pym. She liked the cosy basement there and it became one of her favourite cafes.

== See also ==
- Lyons Corner House - a rival chain of tea shops from the same era.
