= Daniel Jones (composer) =

Welsh composer (1912–1993)

Background information
- Born: Daniel Jenkyn Jones; 7 December 1912; Pembroke, Wales
- Died: 23 April 1993 (aged 80) Swansea, Wales
- Genres: Classical
- Years active: 1930s–1980s

Daniel Jenkyn Jones OBE (7 December 1912 – 23 April 1993) was a Welsh composer of classical music, who worked in Britain. He used both serial and tonal techniques. He is best known for his quartets and thirteen symphonies (some composed in his own system of 'Complex Metres') and for his song settings for Dylan Thomas's play Under Milk Wood.

== Biography ==
Jones was born in Pembroke in south Wales. His father, Jenkyn Jones, was a composer and his mother a singer, and by the time he was nine years old the young Daniel had himself written several piano sonatas.

He attended the Bishop Gore School in Swansea (1924–1931), where his enthusiasm for literature led to a close friendship with the poet Dylan Thomas, and to his going on to study English literature at Swansea University. At this period Jones and Thomas were part of the informal group of aspiring artists who would meet at the Kardomah cafe in Castle Street, Swansea. Other members of the group were the poet Vernon Watkins and the painter Alfred Janes. In 1935 Jones left Swansea to study music at the Royal Academy of Music in London (1935–1938), where his teachers included Sir Henry Wood and Harry Farjeon. Winning the Mendelssohn Scholarship in 1935 allowed him to study in Czechoslovakia, France, the Netherlands and Germany, and to develop his skills as a linguist.

In 1937 Jones married Penelope Eunice Bedford, with whom he had three daughters. In the years leading up to the Second World War he composed his first large-scale orchestral works, Symphonic Prologue and Five Pieces for Orchestra, and developed his own compositional system of 'Complex Metres'.

During the war, as a captain in the Intelligence Corps (1940–1946), he used his linguistic abilities at Bletchley Park codes centre as a cryptographer and a decoder of Russian, Romanian and Japanese texts. In 1944 Jones married his second wife, Irene Goodchild, with whom he had one son and one daughter.

After the war, Jones won increasing recognition as an innovative composer. In 1950 his Symphonic Prologue won the first prize of the Royal Philharmonic Society, and thereafter most of his compositions were written to commission – from the Festival of Britain, the Swansea Festival, the Royal National Eisteddfod, the BBC, the Royal Philharmonic Orchestra and the Llandaff Festival. Between 1945 and 1985 he composed his series of twelve symphonies, each centred on one semi-tone of the chromatic scale, and in 1992 his unnumbered Symphony in Memoriam John Fussell (his friend, the Director of the Swansea Festival). By 1993 he had composed eight string quartets, as well as works in many other genres, including the cantata, The Country Beyond the Stars, a setting of Henry Vaughan's poem.

Jones enjoyed long friendships with several artists, among them Vernon Watkins, Ceri Richards and Grace Williams, and, most closely, Dylan Thomas. As well as composing song-settings for Thomas's Under Milk Wood (1954) and dedicating his fourth symphony (1954) to Thomas's memory, he edited collections of Thomas's poetry and prose, and in 1977 published the memoir, My Friend Dylan Thomas.

In 1968 Jones was awarded an OBE.

He died in 1993 at his home, high up on the Gower Peninsula, 55 Southward Lane, Newton, Swansea, where he had composed "in a room looking down on Oystermouth Castle and out over Swansea Bay".

His archive is held at the National Library of Wales, Aberystwyth. An oil portrait of Jones by Alfred Janes is held by the National Museum Cardiff; a photographic portrait by Bernard Mitchell (1967) is held by the National Portrait Gallery, London.

In 2008 the actor Adrian Metcalf and composer Rob Marshall drew on the compositions and writings of Jones and Thomas in their tribute, "Warmley" (named after Daniel Jones's boyhood home).

== Composition ==
By 1936, Jones had devised his own compositional system of Complex Metres, which was fully developed in his Sonata for Three Non-Chromatic Kettle-Drums (1947). In 1950, he described this system: "The unifying element of fixed pattern is present, but the pattern itself is asymmetrical, therefore with a powerful means of satisfying structural requirements there would seem to be possible both a greater variety and a greater subtlety in the rhythm-metre relationship". Jones's system was adapted in Germany by the composer Boris Blacher. For Jones himself his complex structures had always to be allied with emotive intention. As is the case with other composers who used both serial techniques and tonality, Jones's music may for a time have seemed too advanced for traditionalists and too old-fashioned for the avant-garde.

== List of works ==
=== Orchestral ===
- Symphonic Prologue (1938)
- Five Pieces for Orchestra (1939)
- Comedy Overture (1943)
- Cloud Messenger, tone poem (1944)
- Symphony No. 1 (1944–45)
- Miscellany, 20 pieces for small orchestra (1947)
- The Flute Player, tone poem
- Symphony No. 2 (1950)
- Concert Overture No. 2 (1951)
- Symphony No. 3 (1951)
- Symphony No. 4, In memoriam Dylan Thomas (1954)
- Ieuenctid, overture (1956)
- Symphony No. 5 (1958)
- Symphony No. 6 (1964)
- Capriccio for Flute, Harp and Strings (1965)
- Severn Bridge Variation (composite work with others) (1966)
- Violin Concerto (1966)
- Investiture Processional Music (1969)
- Symphony No. 7 (1971)
- Sinfonietta No. 1 (1972)
- Symphony No. 8 (1972)
- Symphony No. 9 (1974)
- Dance Fantasy (1976)
- Symphony No. 10 (1980)
- Oboe Concerto (1982)
- Symphony No. 11, In memoriam G. F. Tyler (1983)
- Symphony No. 12 (1985)
- Cello Concerto (1986)
- Sinfonietta No. 2 (1992)
- Symphony No. 13, In memoriam John Fussell (1992)

=== Chamber ===
- String Quartet No. 1 (1946)
- Suite for viola and cello (1949)
- String Quartet No. 2 (1957)
- String Trio (1970)
- String Quartet No. 3 (1975)
- String Quartet No. 4 (1978)
- String Quartet No. 5 (1980)
- String Quartet No. 6 (1982)
- String Quartet No. 7 (1987)
- Sonata for Four Trombones (1988)
- Divertimento for wind quintet (1990)
- String Quartet No. 8 (1993; unfinished, performing edition by Malcolm Binney & Giles Easterbrook)

=== Instrumental ===
- Solo cello sonata (1946)
- Sonata for Three Non-Chromatic Kettledrums (1947)
- Bagatelles for piano (1955)
- Cello Sonata (1972)
- Toccata and Fugue for organ (1974)

=== Dramatic ===
- Under Milk Wood, incidental music for Dylan Thomas (1954)
- The Knife, opera (1961)

=== Choral ===
- The Country Beyond the Stars, cantata after Henry Vaughan (1958)
- St Peter, oratorio (1962)
- Orestes, opera (1967)
- Come, my Way, my Truth, my Life, cantata for tenor, SATB chorus and orchestra (1987)

== Discography ==
- Daniel Jones, Complete string quartets (Chandos CHAN 9535)
- Daniel Jones, Dance Fantasy [and works by A. Hoddinott and W. Mathias] (Lyrita SRCD 334).
- Daniel Jones, Symphonies 1, 10 (recorded by BBC, issued on Lyrita SRCD 358)
- Daniel Jones, Symphonies 2, 11 (recorded by BBC, issued on Lyrita SRCD 364)
- Daniel Jones, Symphonies 3, 5 (recorded by BBC, issued on Lyrita SRCD 390).
- Daniel Jones, Symphonies 4, 7, 8 (remastered on Lyrita SRCD 329)
- Daniel Jones, Symphonies 6, 9, and The Country Beyond the Stars (remastered on Lyrita SRCD 326)
- Daniel Jones, Symphonies 12, 13, cantata Come, my Way, my Truth, my Life (recorded by BBC, issued on Lyrita SRCD 391).
