= William Grant Murray =

British painter

- Born: 11 August 1877; Portsoy, Scotland
- Died: 17 December 1950 (aged 73); Swansea, Wales
- Occupations: Art teacher; Art gallery curator; Painter

William Grant Murray (11 August 1877 – 11 November 1950), usually known as Grant Murray, was a British art teacher, gallery curator and artist. He was Principal of Swansea Art School from 1908 to 1943, and the first curator of the Glynn Vivian Art Gallery, Swansea, from 1910 to 1950. He played a leading part in the artistic life of Swansea between the wars.

== Biography ==
Murray was born on 11 August 1877 in Portsoy, Aberdeenshire, Scotland, the second son of William Alexander Minty Murray (1848–1920), a cabinet maker, and his wife May Grant (1848–1890). His elder brother George Murray (1897–1898) also became an artist, who was renowned for his murals, portraits and mosaics.

He was educated at Blairgowrie High School, Blairgowrie School of Art (1893–1897), Edinburgh School of Art (1897–1898) and the Royal College of Art in London (1876–1933), where he won several prizes. After leaving the Royal College with an ARCA, he studied at Académie Julian in Paris in 1905.

In 1909 he married Margaret Falconer Findlay. They had two sons: Ivan Grant (born 1912) and George Findlay (born 1913). He died in Swansea on 17 November 1950.

== Swansea Art School ==
Before moving to Swansea, Murray was Art Headmaster of West Bromwich Municipal School of Art for three and a half years.

While being interviewed for the position of principal of Swansea Municipal School of Art in 1908 (later Swansea Art School, now part of University of Wales, Trinity Saint David), Murray told the interviewing panel:

Unless you are prepared to spend money on your art school, don't appoint me.

He told them that the Art School was the most dismal that he had ever seen, the rooms were too small and the lighting was bad. As far as he could see, their Art School was as good as dead and he had no desire to be associated with the inevitable funeral! He was appointed on the first ballot.

On his appointment he was the only teacher for 107 part-time students. Under his leadership the school grew rapidly in scope and reputation. In 1910 the Art School was ranked 140th in England and Wales; by 1914 it was in 25th place. In 1925 the school won a Grand Prix at the International Exposition of Modern Industrial and Decorative Arts in Paris. In 1939 it had 530 students.

Murray introduced stained glass making in the art school in 1935. It has since developed into a major centre for artistic glass.

He retired in 1943, after 34 years as principal.

== Glynn Vivian Art Gallery ==
In 1911, two years after becoming principal of Swansea Art School, Murray was asked to become curator of the new Glynn Vivian Art Gallery in Swansea. He accepted, providing that an assistant was appointed at the school, and held both posts concurrently. The gallery was financed by the art collector Glynn Vivian, who provided his collection of paintings, drawings and china.

Building on Glynn Vivian's collection, Murray expanded the gallery's collection by acquiring works by established painters such as Augustus John, Gwen John and James Dickson Innes; and younger painters including Kyffin Williams and John Elwyn.

Murray played a leading part in the acquisition for Swansea of the British Empire Panels by Frank Brangwyn. These sixteen large panels had been commissioned in 1927 for the Royal Gallery at the House of Lords as a memorial to the dead of the First World War, but they were rejected as unsuitable for the Palace of Westminster. They were installed in the Brangwyn Hall Swansea in 1934, where they remain.

Murray remained curator of the Glynn Vivian Art Gallery until his death in 1950.

== Painting ==
Murray was a figurative artist who mainly painted landscapes in watercolour and oils. At the Académie Julian in Paris he learned to brighten his palette, and to take on new ideas from the impressionists.

== Public collections ==
Murray's paintings are in the following public collections:

- Glynn Vivian Art Gallery, Swansea
- National Museum Cardiff
- Cyfarthfa Castle Museum and Art Gallery, Merthyr Tydfil
- Aberdeen Art Gallery
