= Glynn Vivian Art Gallery =

Public art museum in Swansea, Wales

- Oriel Gelf Glynn Vivian
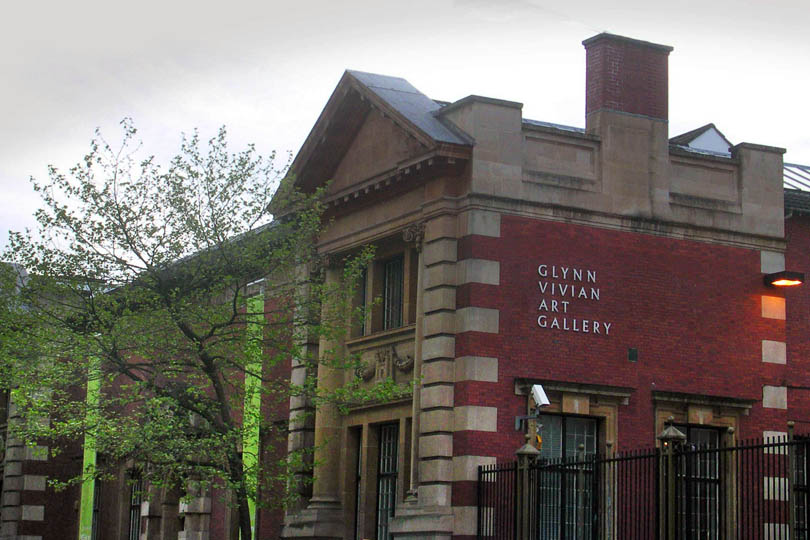

- Location within Swansea
- Established: 1911
- Location: Swansea, Wales
- Coordinates: 51.6236°N 3.9445°W
- Key holdings: Correggio; Gustave Doré; John Constable; Ben Nicholson; Barbara Hepworth; John Piper; Kyffin Williams; Paul Nash; Wyndham Lewis; Franz Anton Bustelli
- Collections: British and European old masters, Surrealist, and Impressionist
- Visitors: 42,682 (2017)
- Founder: Glynn Vivian
- Website: swansea.gov.uk/glynnvivian

The Glynn Vivian Art Gallery is the public art gallery of the City and County of Swansea, in Wales, United Kingdom. The gallery is situated in Alexandra Road, near Swansea railway station, opposite the old Swansea Central Library.

== History ==
The creation of the Glynn Vivian Art Gallery was made possible when in 1905 Glynn Vivian offered his collection of paintings, drawings and china to the city with an endowment of £10,000. The donor laid the foundation stone himself in 1909, but it was after his death that the Gallery was formally opened in 1911, with "great enthusiasm and gaiety." The building was designed by Glendinning Moxham in the Edwardian Baroque style. William Grant Murray, director of the Swansea Art School, became the Gallery's first director; since 1951 the Gallery has had its own Curator.

Glynn Vivian's collection, like most private collections, was eclectic. By donations – including the John Deffett Francis collection of prints and drawings and the Kildare S.Meager bequest of Swansea china – and by purchases the Gallery's holdings have become more representative of the range of European art, while remaining rich in the work of local artists. The gallery also runs free community activities, workshops and events.

== Refurbishment 2011 ==
In October 2011 the gallery was closed temporarily for a £6 million refurbishment and recladding of the 1974 extension. During the closure, the gallery planned to continue a programme of activities using alternative local venues. The former chair of the Arts Council of Wales was quoted as saying "The Glynn Vivian is a major civic facility and the only purpose-built art gallery in Wales that is still open. It will be missed by the people of Swansea but they will welcome it back in its renewed form". The work schedule was extended by two years after the original contractor went in to administration. The building re-opened in 2016.

== Collection ==
The gallery displays a broad spectrum of visual arts from the original bequest of Glynn Vivian (1835–1910), and includes work by Old Masters as well as an international collection of porcelain and Swansea china.

The paintings include work by Richard Wilson, Claude Monet, Thomas Jones, Mark Gertler, Augustus John, Gwen John, Stanley Spencer, Lucien Pissarro, Paul Nash, Guido Reni, Cedric Morris, Ben Nicholson, Alfred Janes, Ceri Richards, Ivon Hitchens, Thomas Lawrence, Evan Walters and Kyffin Williams.

Among the prints may be found work by Albrecht Dürer, Agostino Carracci, William Blake and Ceri Richards. Watercolours and drawings include work by Richard Wilson, Thomas Gainsborough, John Sell Cotman, Thomas Rowlandson, Richard Parkes Bonington, Gwen John and Ceri Richards.

The Gallery has an extensive collection of Swansea porcelain and china, as well as select pieces of other British and European factories, and of British and French glass. Among these is one of the earliest examples of European porcelain, a Meissen experimental vase complete with AR mark.

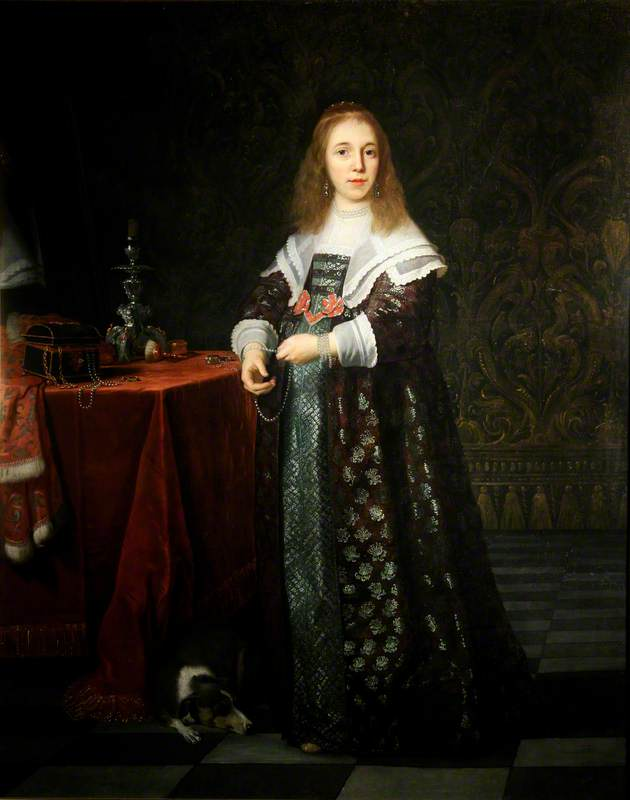
Portrait of a Young Lady by Bartholomeus van der Helst

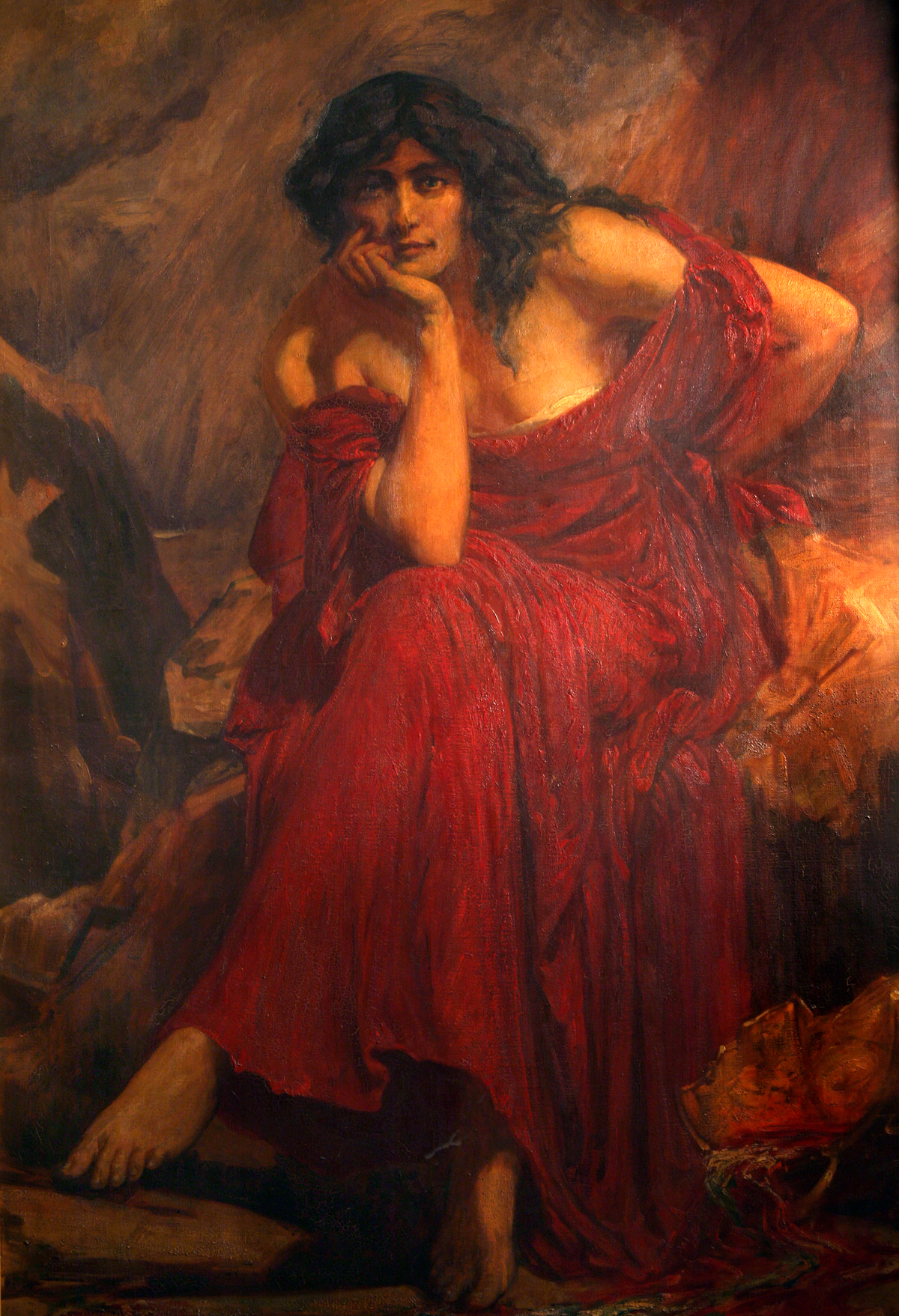
Ceridwen by Christopher Williams

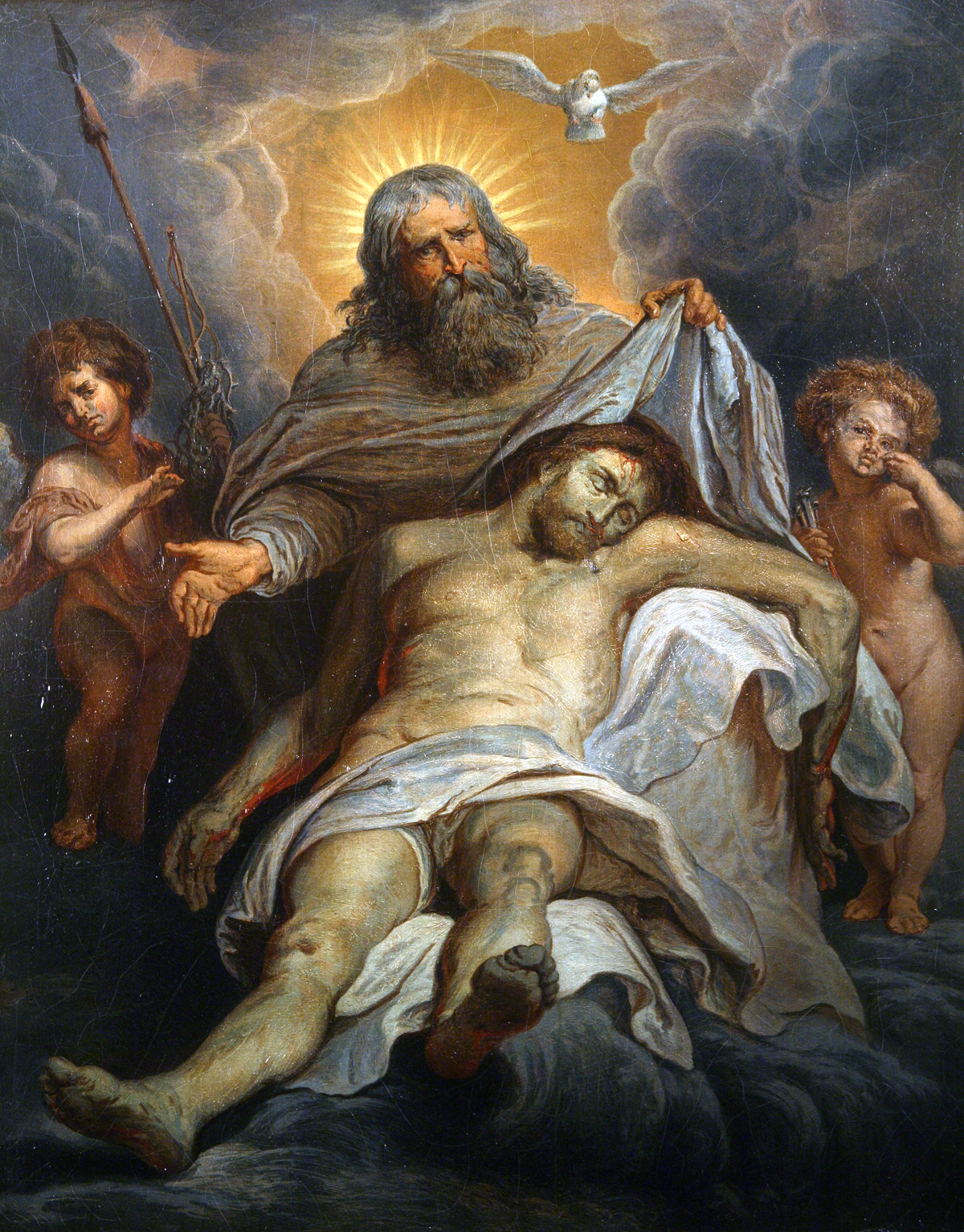
La Sainte Trinite by Gustave Doré

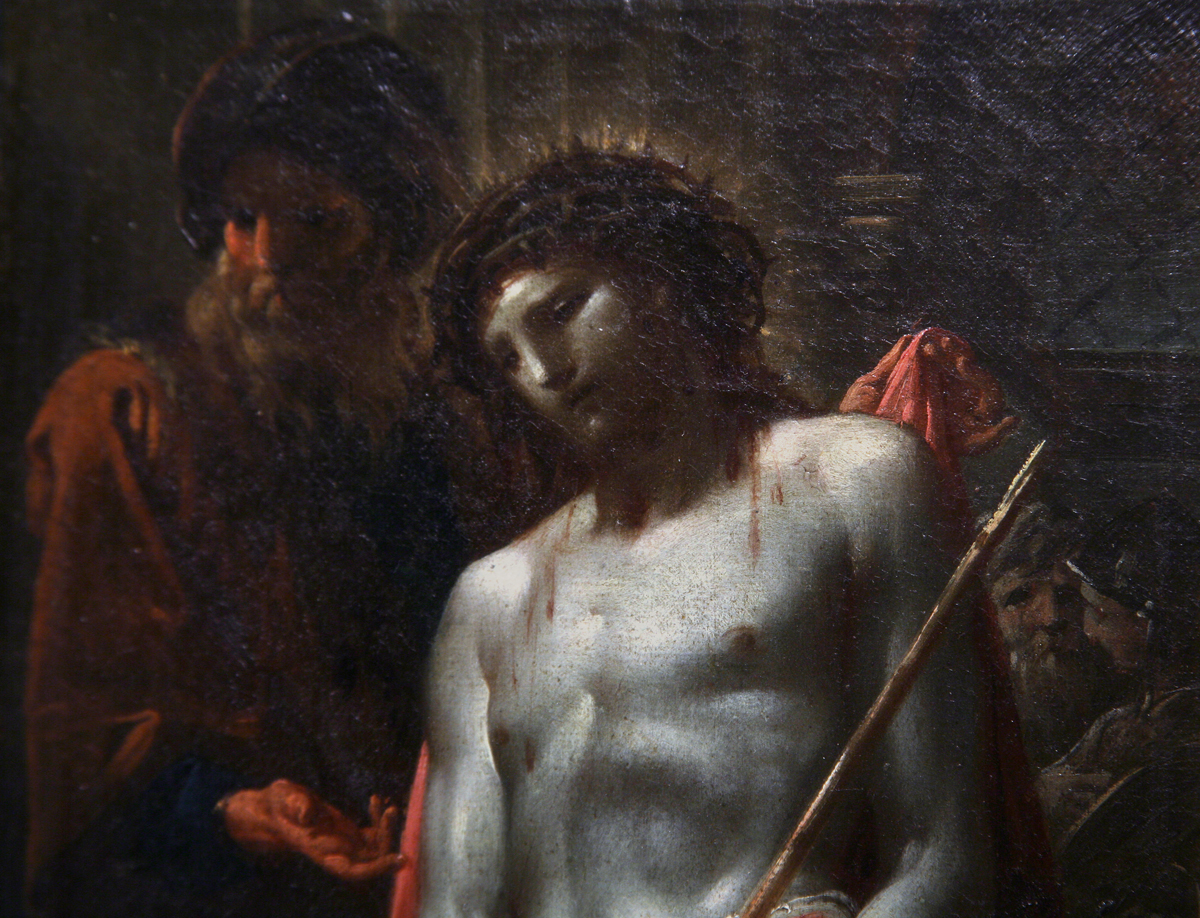
Ecce Homo by Antonio da Correggio

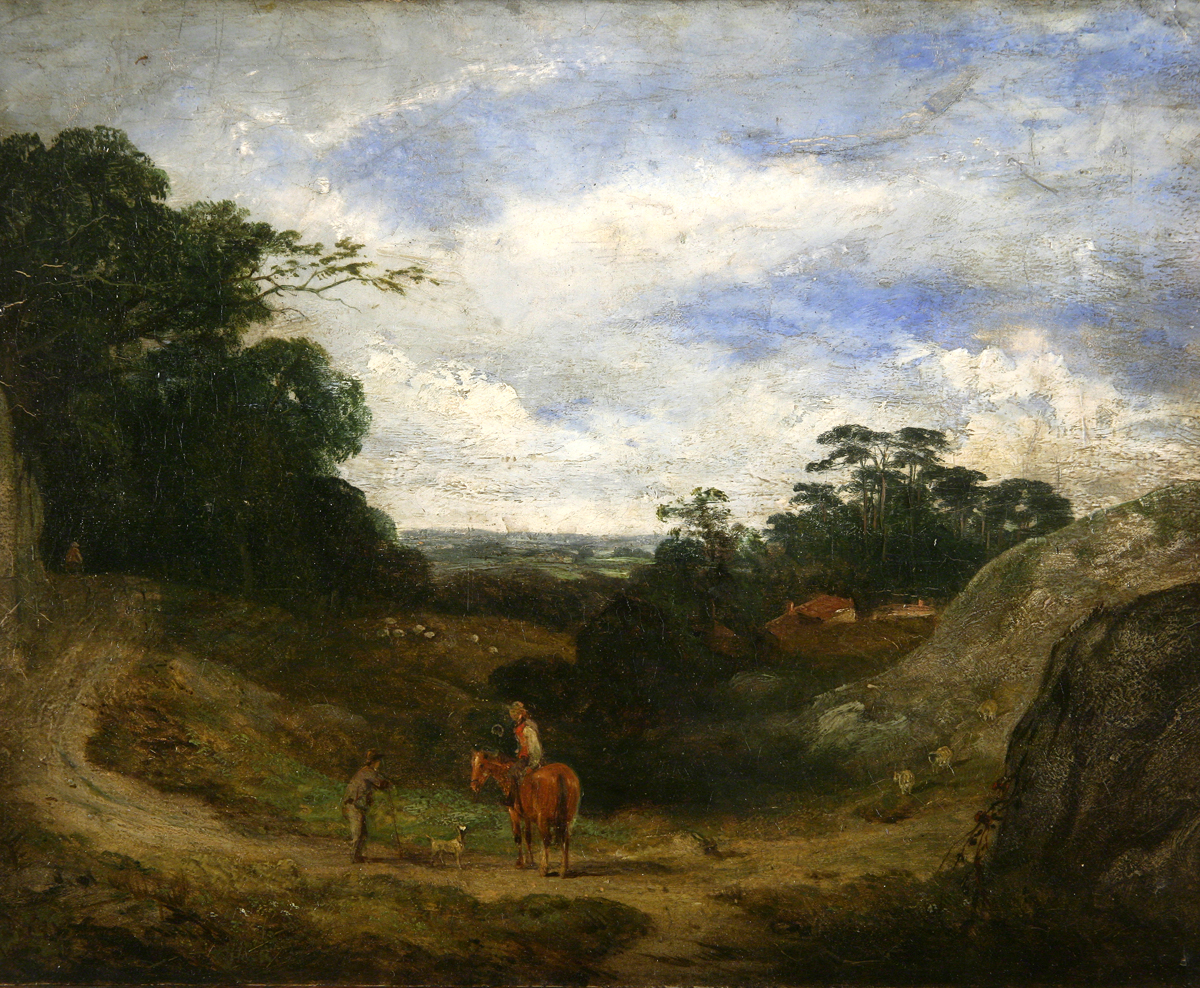
Landscape with Shepherd by David Cox

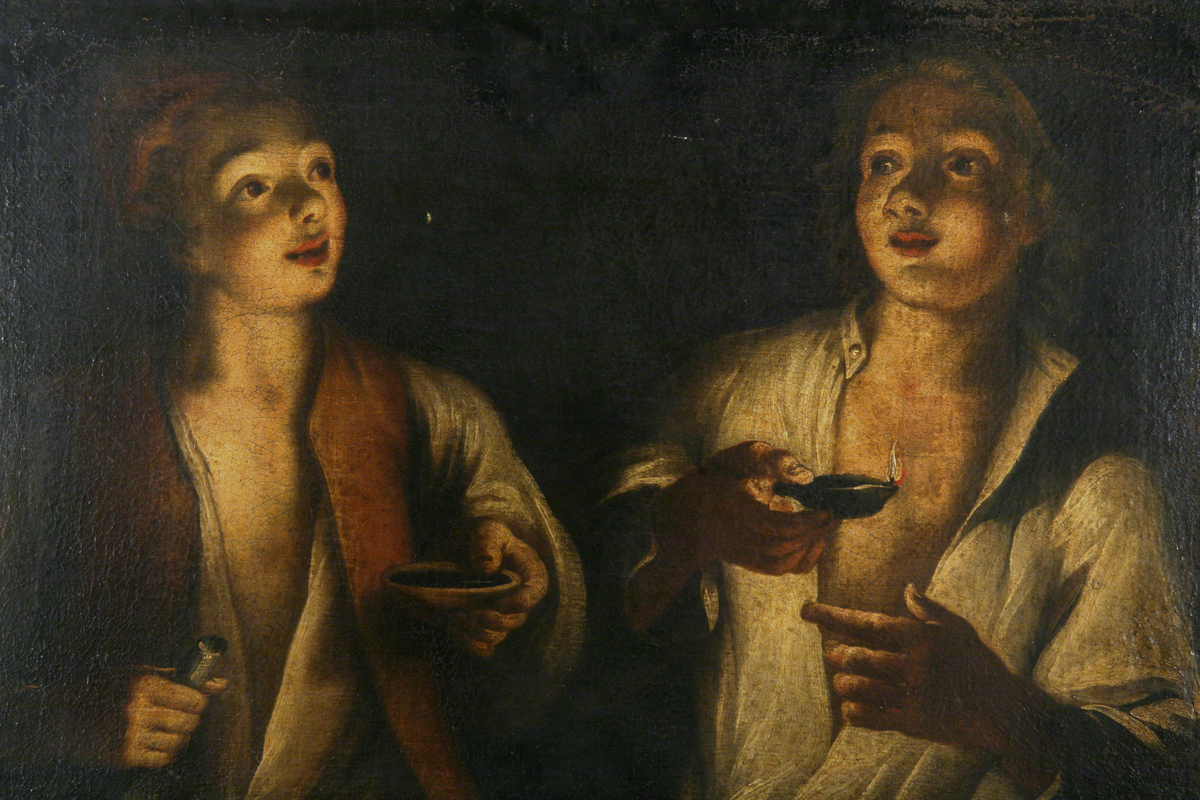
Good Night

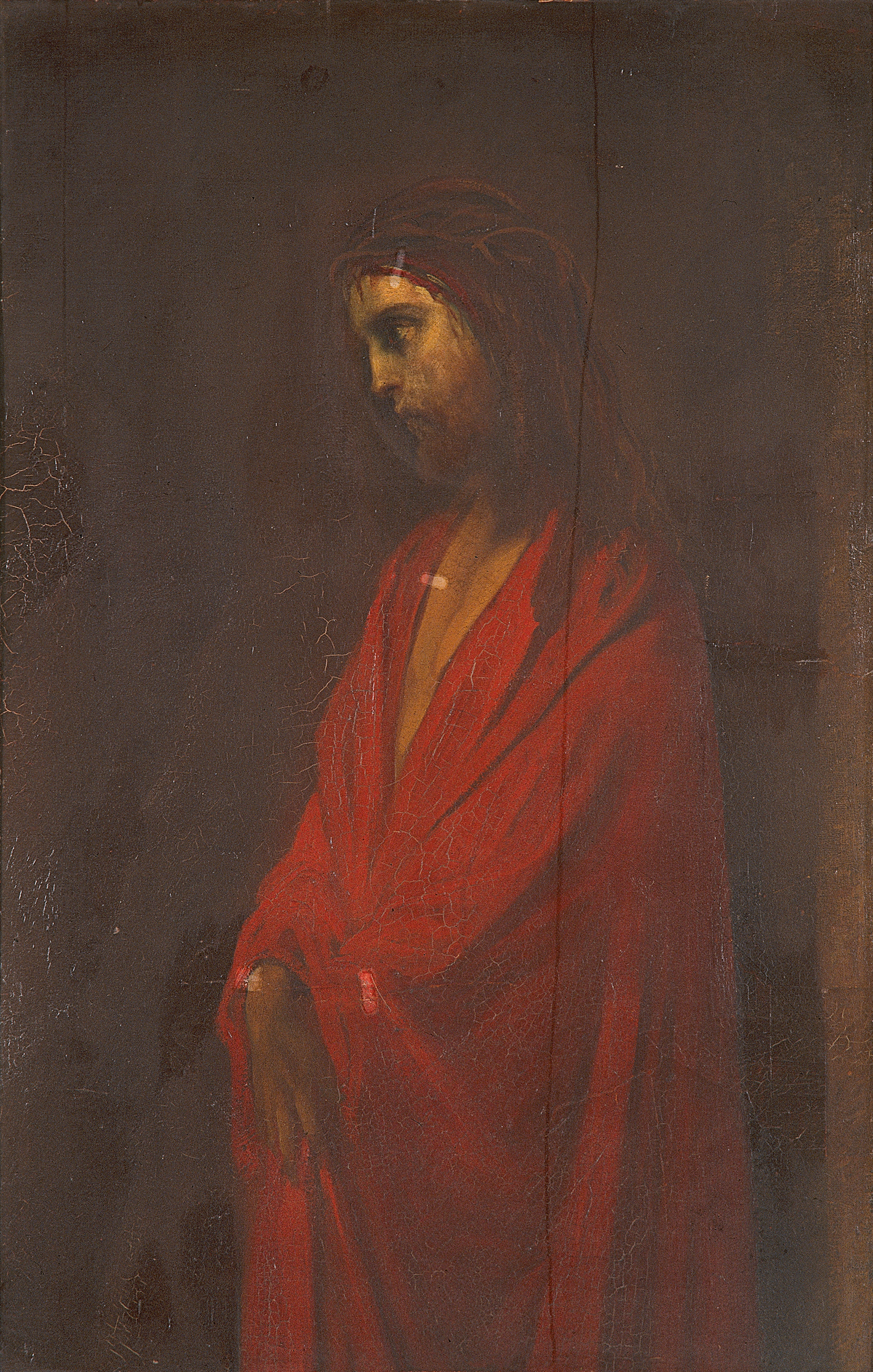
Ecce Homo by Gustave Doré

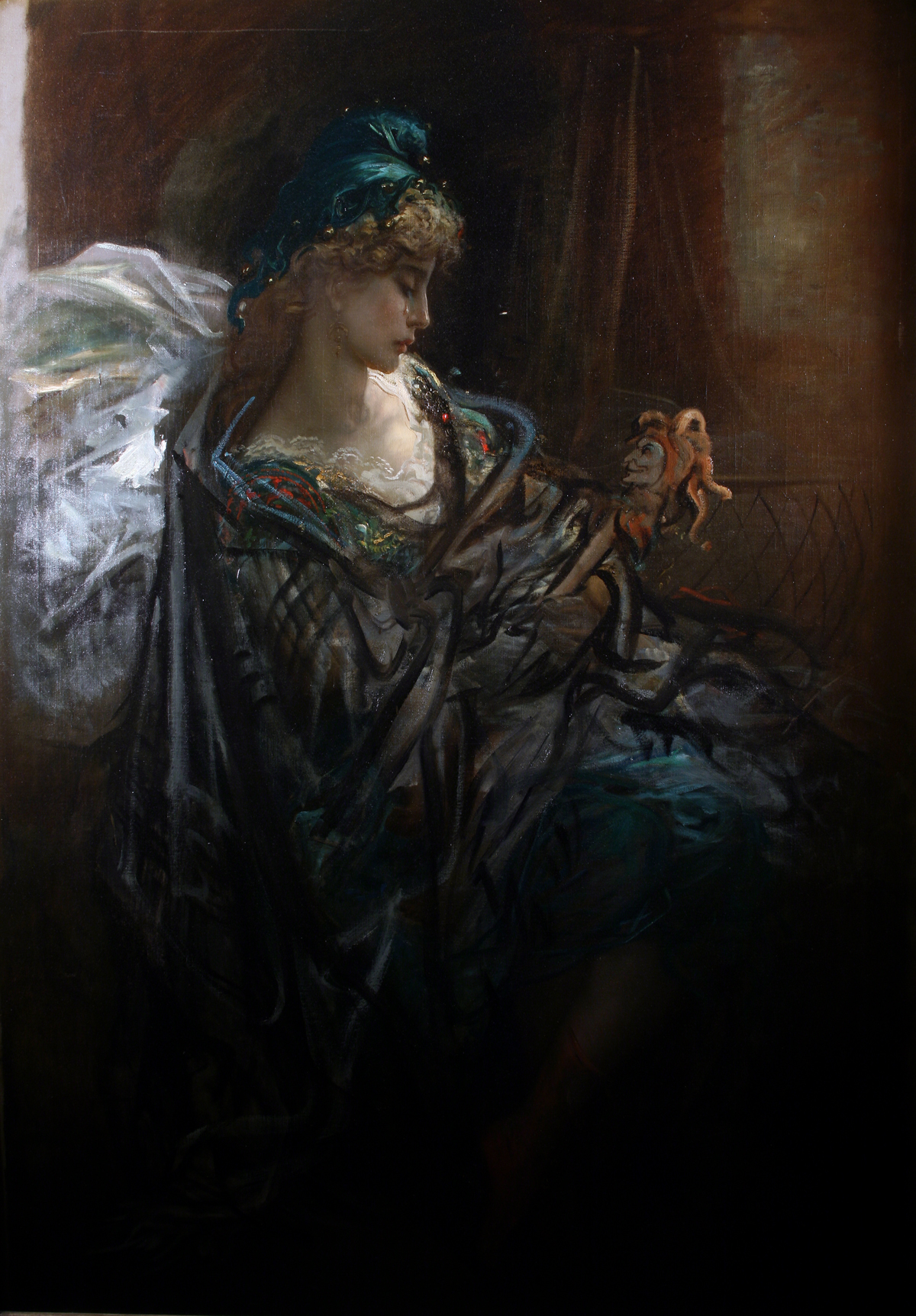
La folie by Gustave Doré

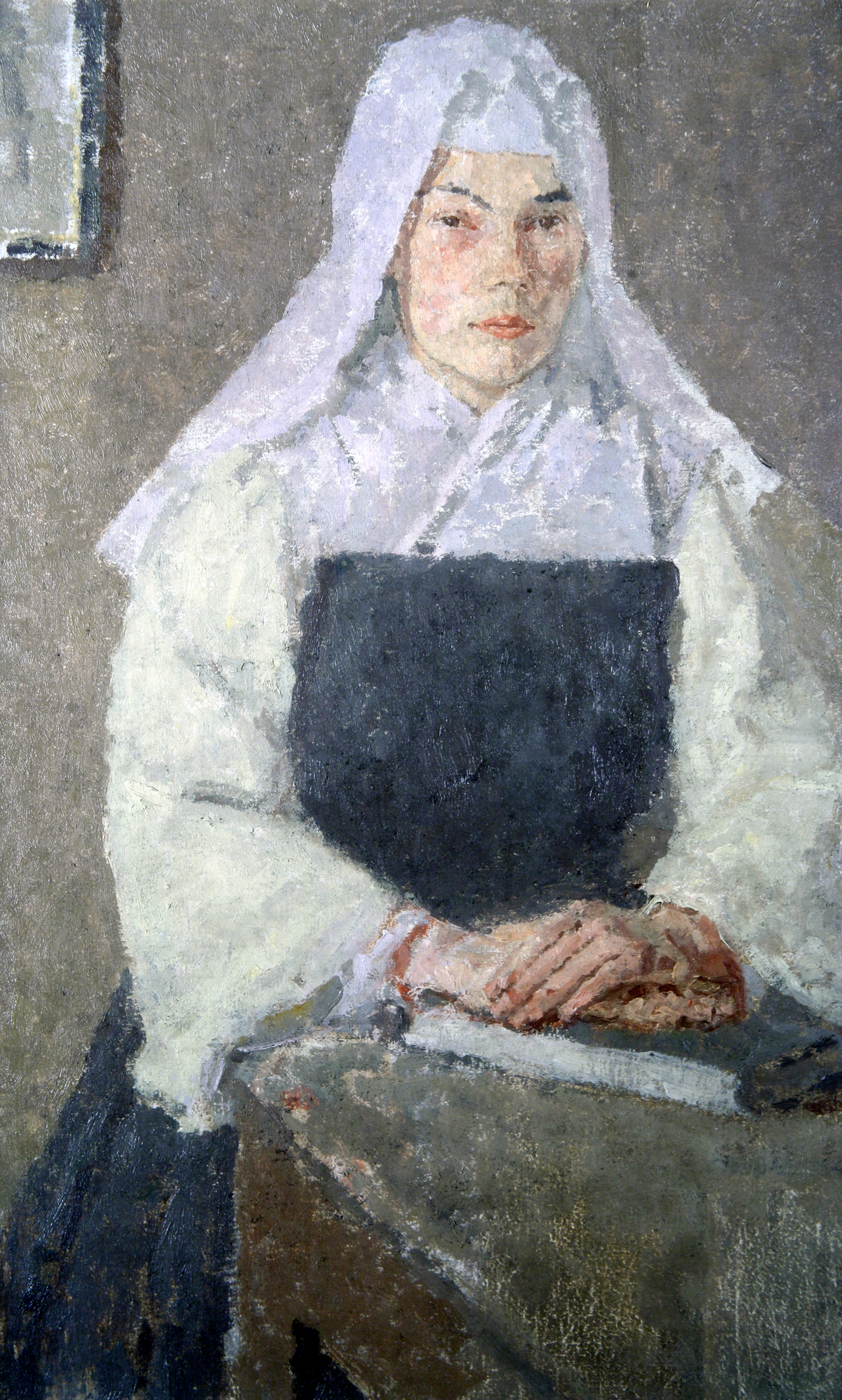
The Nun by Gwen John

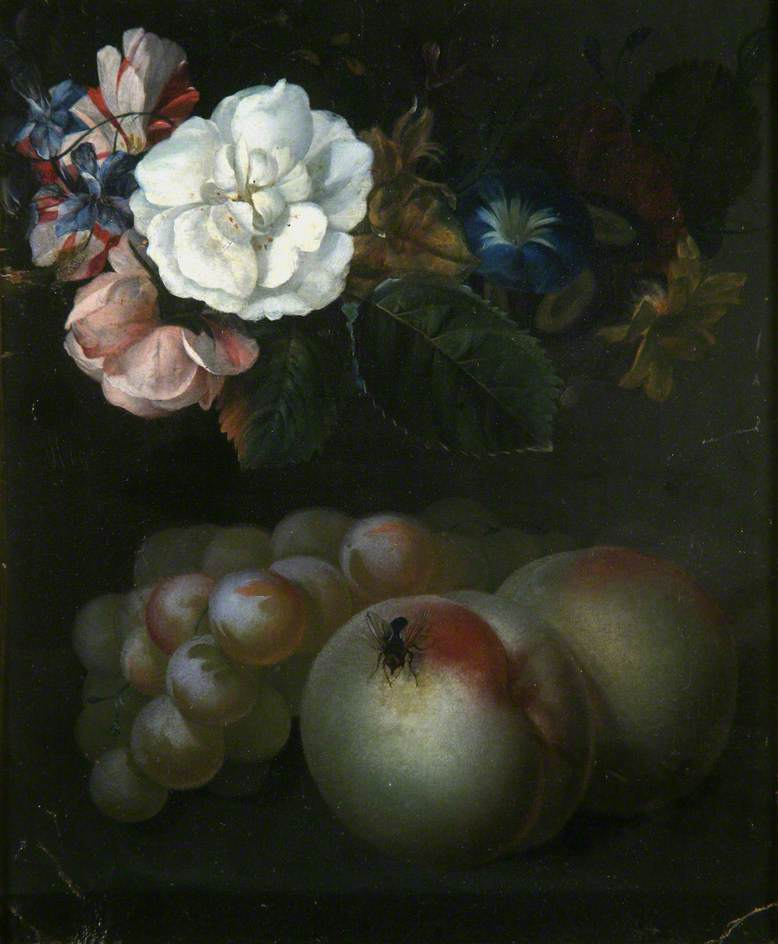
Study of fruit and flowers by Agatha van der Mijn

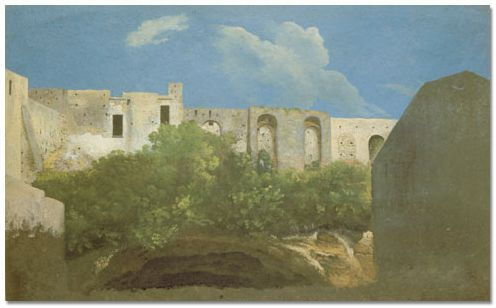
Ruined Buildings in Naples by Thomas Jones

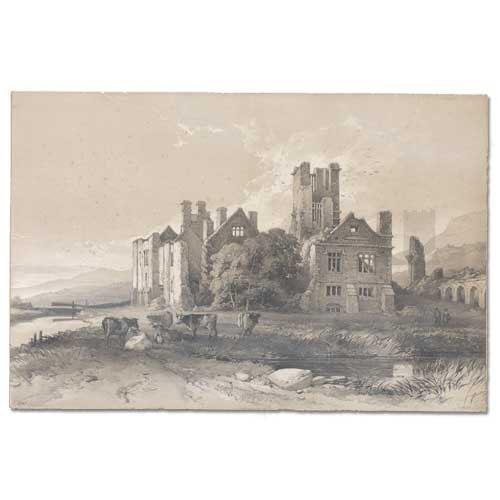
Neath Abbey by John Syer
