= List of women artists associated with Wales =

This is a list of women artists who were born in Wales or whose artworks, or careers, are closely associated with Wales.

== A ==
- Sadie Allen (1930–2017), painter, textile artist
- Edith Lovell Andrews (1886–1980), painter
- Manon Awst (born 1983), sculptor, performance artist

== B ==
- Irene Bache (1901–1999) London-born artist who lived in Swansea from 1942
- Joan Baker (1922–2017), painter

== C ==
- Brenda Chamberlain (1912–1971), Welsh artist, poet and novelist, working in Wales and Greece
- Felicity Charlton (1913–2009), Bristol-born artist who lived in Wales from 1939
- Melanie Counsell (born 1964), installation artist and sculptor.
- Glenys Cour (born 1924), painter and stained glass artist

== D ==
- Thereza Dillwyn Llewelyn (1834–1926), photographer
- Edith Downing (1857–1931), sculptor

== E ==
- Mildred Eldridge (1909–1991), artist born in London who lived in Wales from 1939

== F ==
- Laura Ford (born 1961), sculptor born in Cardiff

== G ==
- Valerie Ganz (1936–2015), painter
- Esther Grainger (1912–1990), painter
- Lillian Griffith (1877–1972), sculptor
- Gwenny Griffiths (1867–1953), portrait painter

== H ==
- Nina Hamnett (1890–1956), Tenby-born artist and artists' model, who exhibited at the Royal Academy
- Cicely Hey (1896–1980), English artist who lived in Llysfaen
- Nichola Hope (born 1975), visual artist
- Sarah Hope (born 1975), visual artist
- Ray Howard-Jones (1903–1996), Berkshire-born artist who lived in Penarth from an early age
- Joan Hutt (1913–1985), Hertfordshire-born painter who moved to live in North Wales in 1949
- Bethan Huws (born 1961)

== J ==
- Eveline Annie Jenkins (1893–1976), botanical artist and illustrator
- Kathryn Jenkins (1961–2009), was a scholar and writer of Welsh hymns
- Gwen John (1876–1939), painter
- Christine Jones (born 1955), ceramicist
- Joy Farrall Jones (born 1933), painter and illustrator
- Shirley Jones (born 1934), printmaker, writer, poet, producer of Artists' Books

== K ==
- Christine Kinsey (born 1942), painter

== L ==
- Kate Lambert (born 1983), fashion designer
- Ruby Levick (c.1872–1940), sculptor
- Thyrza Anne Leyshon (1892–1996), miniature painter
- Doris Lindner (1896–1979), sculptor
- Eirian Llwyd (1951–2014), printmaker
- Mary Lloyd (1819–1896), sculptor
- Mary Lloyd Jones (born 1934), painter
- Sarah J. Lloyd (born 1896), landscape painter

== M ==
- Helen Mackay (1897–1973), sculptor
- Edwina McGrail (born 1950), artist and poet
- Valerie Miles (1914–1999), painter and illustrator
- Eleri Mills (born 1955), painter
- Tracey Moberly (born 1964), multidisciplinary artist
- Mali Morris (born 1945)

== N ==
- Liz Neal (born 1973), artist based in London
- Mary Edith Nepean (1876–1960)

== O ==
- Rachel Owen (1968–2016)
- Joan Oxland (1920–2009), painter

== P ==
- Kusha Petts (1921–2003)
- Cherry Pickles (born 1950)
- Anya Paintsil (born 1993)

== Q ==
- Mary Quant (1934–2023)

== R ==
- Shani Rhys James (born 1953), Australia-born painter, moved to Wales after graduation
- Julie Roberts (born 1963), painter

== S ==
- Helen Sear (born 1955), photographic artist
- Jane Simpson (born 1965), sculptor
- Annie Morgan Suganami (born 1952)
- Alia Syed (born 1964), Swansea-born artist and filmmaker, now living and working in London
- Joy Saunders (born 1961), South Wales landscape artist

== W ==
- Mary White (1926–2013), ceramic artist
- Lucy Gwendolen Williams (1870–1955)
- Claudia Williams (born 1933), painter
- Margaret Lindsay Williams (1888–1960), portrait painter
- Annie Williams (born 1942), still life watercolour painter who grew up in Wales
- Sue Williams (born 1956), visual artist
- Caroline Catherine Wilkinson (1822–1881)
- Frances Elizabeth Wynne (1835–1907)
- Nancy Wynne-Jones (1922–2006), painter
