= 1989 in Wales =

- Centuries: 18th; 19th; 20th; 21st
- Decades: 1960s; 1970s; 1980s; 1990s; 2000s
- See also: List of years in Wales; Timeline of Welsh history 1989 in The United Kingdom England Scotland Elsewhere

This article is about the particular significance of the year 1989 to Wales and its people.

== Incumbents ==
- Secretary of State for Wales – Peter Walker
- Archbishop of Wales – George Noakes, Bishop of St David's
- Archdruid of the National Eisteddfod of Wales – Emrys Deudraeth

== Events ==
- 22 February – While out canvassing for the Conservative Party in the Pontypridd by-election campaign, MP Sir Raymond Gower is taken ill and dies, occasioning a by-election in his own seat of the Vale of Glamorgan.
- 23 February – In a parliamentary by-election at Pontypridd, caused by the death of Labour MP Brynmor John, Dr Kim Howells retains the seat for Labour.
- 27 February – Newport County A.F.C., bottom of the GM Vauxhall Conference (highest division outside the Football League in England), are declared bankrupt in the High Court with debts in the region of £330,000. The club was in the Football League for nearly 70 years until last year.
- 5 April – Newport County lose a final appeal in the High Court against their winding-up order, and officially go out of business. They are expelled from the GM Vauxhall Conference for failing to fulfill their fixtures, having not played any scheduled matches for nearly two months. They are subsequently reformed and are expected to compete in the English lower leagues.
- 4 May – In the by-election for the Westminster Parliament brought about by the death of Sir Raymond Gower, John Smith wins the Vale of Glamorgan seat for the Labour Party after 38 years of Conservative control.
- 27 May – John Evans of Fforestfach becomes the UK's oldest man ever; Evans dies the following year, but the record stands until 2009.
- 20 June – The new Penmaenbach Tunnel opens on the A55 road.
- 26 August – Closure of Oakdale Colliery, the last mine in Gwent.
- 7 December – The body of an unidentified girl is found by workmen in a derelict house in Cardiff. The remains are eventually identified by forensic scientists as those of 15-year-old Karen Price, who had gone missing in 1981.
- date unknown
  - The Open University begins offering a course in Welsh.
  - Newly qualified doctors are allowed to take the Hippocratic oath in Welsh for the first time.
  - The House of Lords ceremony for the swearing-in of a new QC is conducted in Welsh for the first time.
  - Wales' first purpose-built Sikh gurdwarah opens in Cardiff.
  - Val Feld becomes head of the Equal Opportunities Commission in Wales.
  - Scarweather lightvessel in Swansea Bay is replaced by a warning buoy.

== Arts and literature ==
- Roger Rees becomes an American citizen.

=== Awards ===
- National Eisteddfod of Wales (held in Llanrwst)
- National Eisteddfod of Wales: Chair – Idris Reynolds
- National Eisteddfod of Wales: Crown – Selwyn Griffiths
- National Eisteddfod of Wales: Prose Medal – Irma Chilton
- Gwobr Goffa Daniel Owen -

=== New books ===
==== English language ====
- Leo Abse – Margaret, Daughter of Beatrice
- Catherine Fisher – Immrana
- Ken Follett – The Pillars of the Earth
- D. Tecwyn Lloyd – John Saunders Lewis
- Christopher Meredith – Shifts
- Jenny Nimmo – The Chestnut Soldier
- Leslie Norris – The Girl from Cardigan
- Nigel Wells – Wilderness/Just Balance

==== Welsh language ====
- Geraint Bowen – John Morris-Jones: y diwygiwr iaith a llên
- Tony Conran – Blodeuwedd
- Hywel Teifi Edwards – Codi'r hen wlad yn ei hol, 1850-1914
- Donald Evans – Iasau
- Alan Llwyd – Yn y Dirfawr Wag
- Prys Morgan – Beibl i Gymru
- Rhydwen Williams – Liwsi Regina

=== Music ===
Classical

- Malcolm Arnold - Four Welsh Dances, Op. 138
- Alun Hoddinott – Star Children
- Jeffrey Lewis – Silentia Noctis

Albums

- Mary Hopkin – Spirit
- Bonnie Tyler – Heaven & Hell (album) (with Meat Loaf)

== Film ==
- Christian Bale is lured back into films to appear in Kenneth Branagh's Henry V. Welsh actor David Lloyd Meredith is also among the cast.

=== Welsh-language films ===
- Becca, filmed in English and Welsh in Australia.

== Broadcasting ==
=== Welsh-language television ===
- Steddfod, Steddfod, with Caryl Parry Jones

=== English-language television ===
- The Great Little Trains of Wales
- Nineteen 96, directed by Karl Francis, co-stars Keith Allen and Brinley Jenkins.

=== Radio ===
February Mike Flynn leaves BBC Radio Wales, having been a presenter at the station since its launch in November 1978.

== Sport ==
- BBC Wales Sports Personality of the Year – Stephen Dodd
- Golf – Stephen Dodd wins the British amateur championship.

== Births ==
- 8 January – Non Stanford, triathlete
- 17 March – Morfydd Clark, actress (in Sweden)
- 25 March – Tom Maynard, cricketer (died 2012)
- 23 June – Darragh Mortell, actor
- 15 July – Gareth Bale, footballer
- 21 July – Chris Gunter, footballer
- 21 August – Jessica Allen, cyclist
- 24 October – Nathan Wyburn, artist
- 10 November – Taron Egerton, actor
- 18 December – David Anthony, wheelchair rugby player
- 30 December – Aaron Morris, footballer

== Deaths ==
- 5 February – Emrys James, actor, 60
- 19 February – Jack Bassett, Wales international rugby union player, 83
- 22 February – Sir Raymond Gower, politician, 72
- 3 May
  - George Lowrie, footballer, 69
  - William Squire, actor, 73
- 25 June – Idris Cox, political activist, 89
- July – Glen Moody, boxer, 80
- 17 September – Don Vines, wrestler, 57
- 5 October
  - Elvet Jones, Wales and British Lions rugby international, 77
  - Dicky Ralph, rugby player, 81
- 20 October – Bill Tamplin, Wales rugby player and captain, 72
- 27 October – Frank Vining, potter, 75
- 7 November – Dai Astley, footballer, 80
- December – Bill Harris, footballer, 61 (stroke)
- 4 December – Elwyn Jones, Baron Elwyn-Jones, former Lord Chancellor, 80
- 10 December – Harold Thomas, rugby player, 75
- 28 December – George Andrews, Wales dual-code rugby player, 85
- 30 December – Madoline Thomas, actress, 99
- date unknown – Eynon Evans, writer and actor, 85

== See also ==
- 1989 in Northern Ireland
