= Andre Stitt =

André Stitt
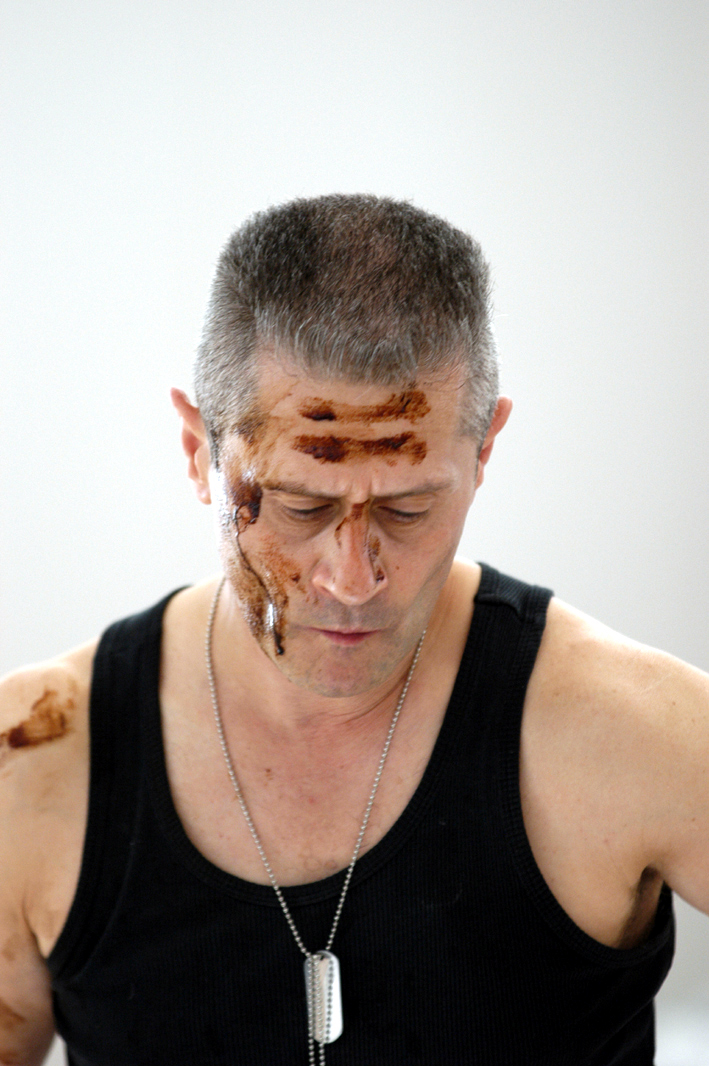
- André Stitt, Baltic Art Centre, Gateshead, 2005
- Born: 1958 (age 67–68); Belfast, Northern Ireland
- Known for: Painting/Contemporary Art
- Website: www.andrestitt.com

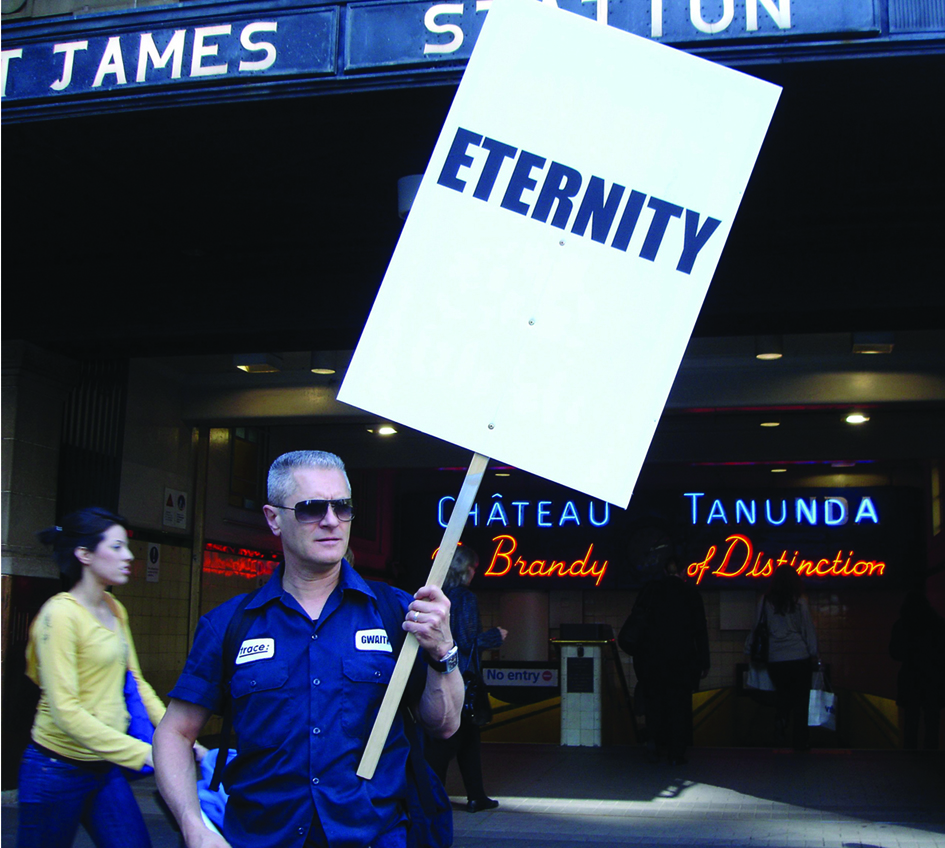
André Stitt, Eternity, Sydney (2009)

André Stitt (born 1958 in Belfast, Northern Ireland) is an artist currently based in Cardiff, Wales, where he is a professor of fine art at the Cardiff School of Art & Design.

== Background ==
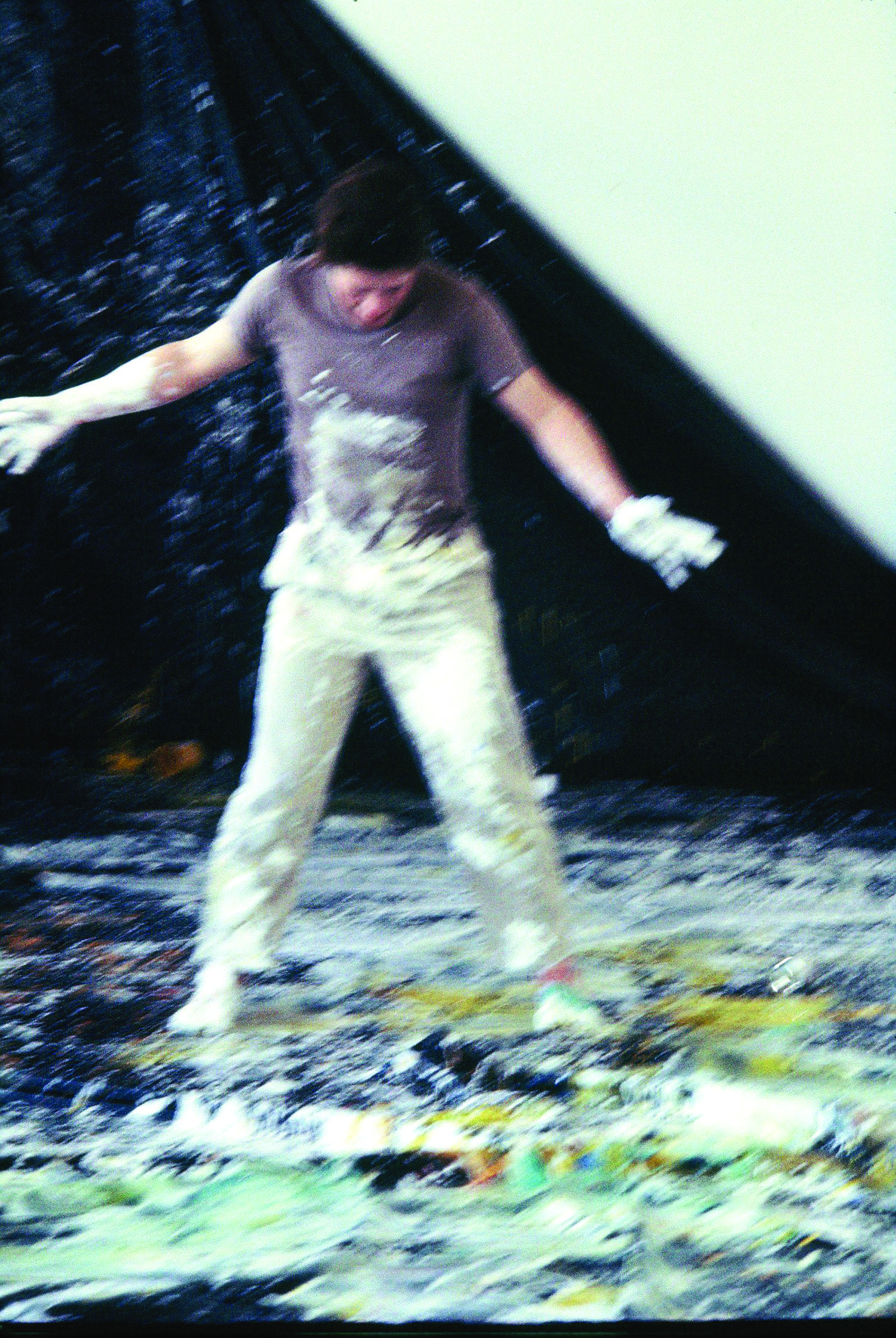
André Stitt, Akshun, Belfast (1977)

Stitt's family moved from Belfast in the 1960s and spent his early life in Seymour Hill, where he attended Dunmurry High School before going to Art College. From 1980 to 1999 he lived and worked in London, presenting his work increasingly internationally throughout the eighties.

He is currently a professor of fine art/painting at the Cardiff School of Art & Design, Cardiff Metropolitan University. He is chair of CFAR (the Centre for Fine Art Research) and a Fellow of the Royal Society of Art and of the Higher Education Academy.

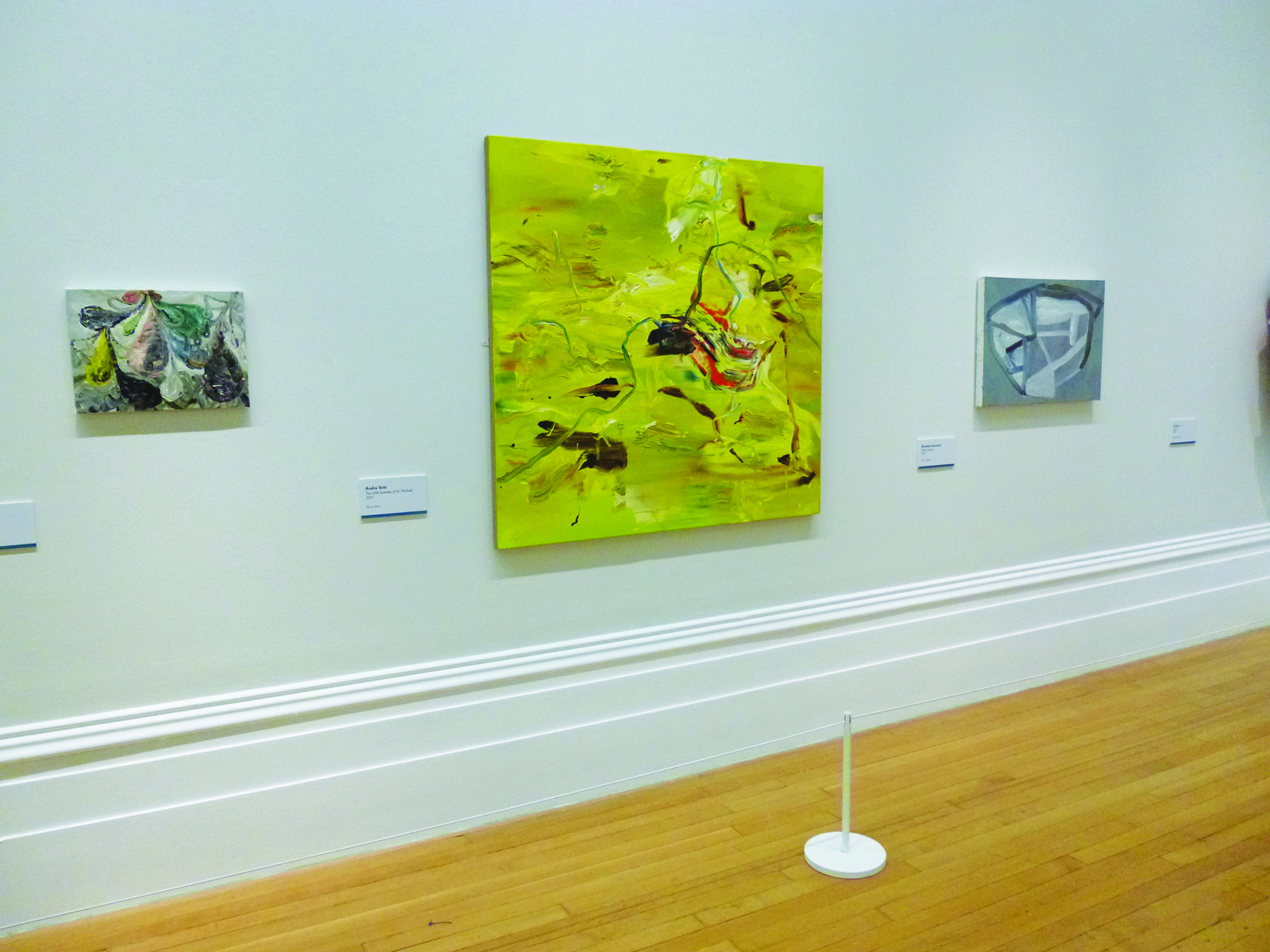
André Stitt, John Moores exhibition at Walker Art Gallery, Liverpool (2012). View of The Little Summer of St Michael

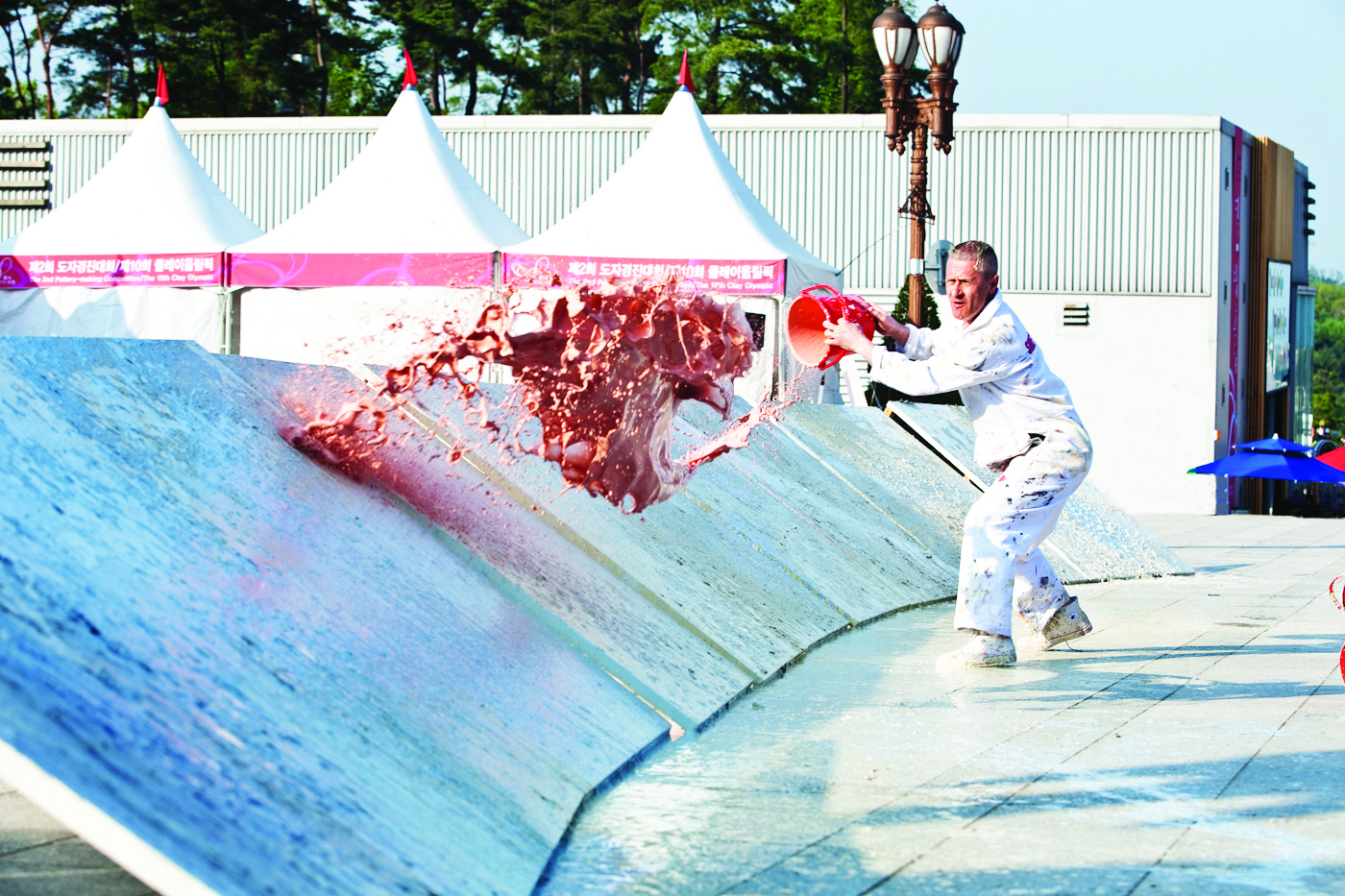
Andre Stitt, Post Gutai Cluster F**k, Korea (2009)

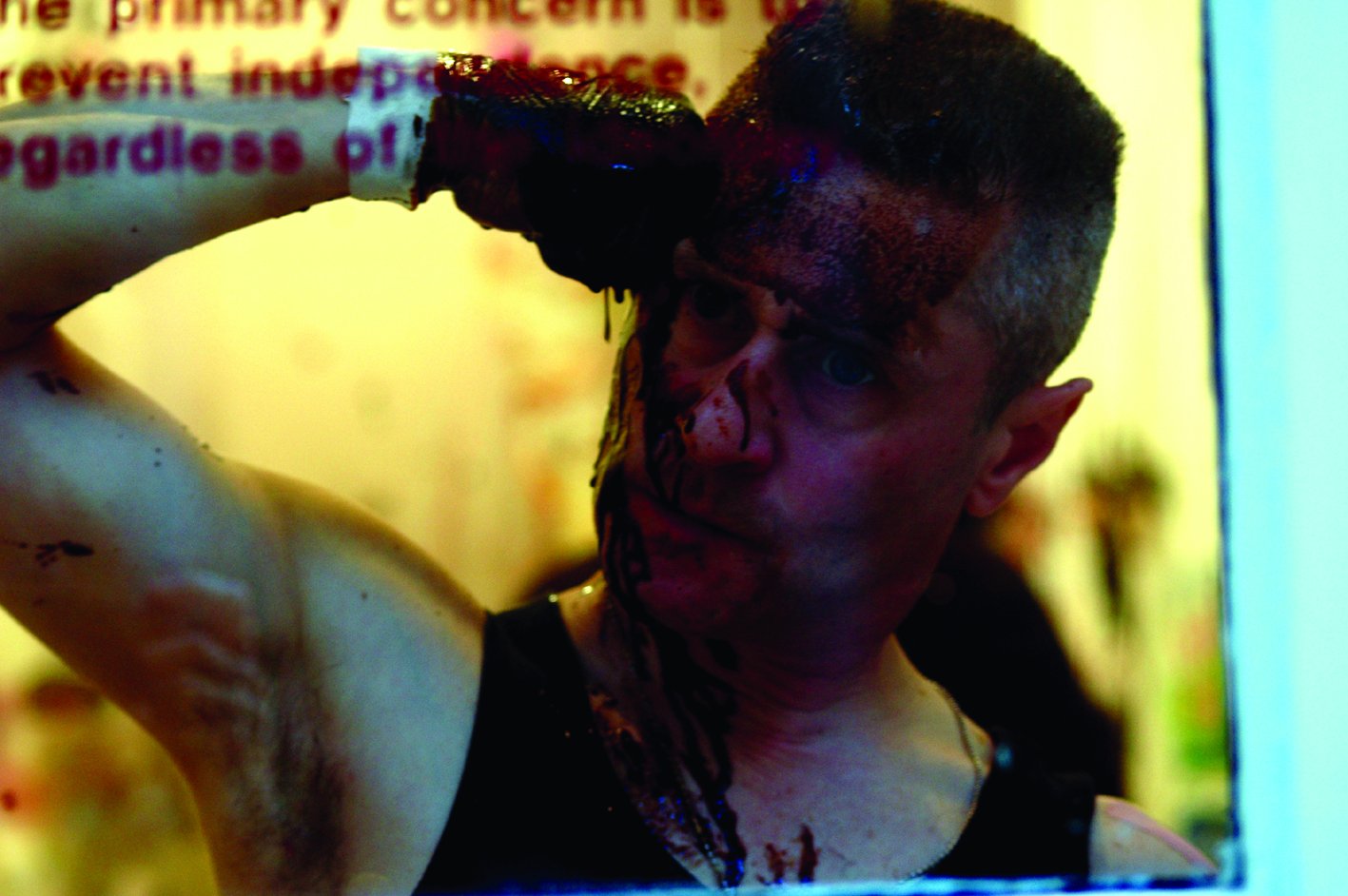
André Stitt, Akshun, Drawing Centre, New York City (2006)

== Work ==
=== Live art ===
Working almost exclusively in live and interdisciplinary art from 1976 to 2000, Stitt gained an international reputation for cutting edge, provocative and politically challenging work. His artistic concern is prevailingly that of communities and their dissolution, often relating to trauma, conflict and art as a redemptive proposition. He often relates this back to the city of Belfast and the 'Troubles' it was going through during his upbringing. His live performance and installation works have been presented at major museums, galleries and sites specific throughout the world.

His work has been included in group exhibitions among others at MoMA PS1, New York City (2000), Venice Biennale (2005), Baltic Centre for Contemporary Art, Gateshead, United Kingdom (2005), Bangkok Art and Culture Centre (2008), Galerie Suvi Lehtinen, Berlin (2011), and at the John Moore's Painting Prize Exhibition at the Walker Art Gallery, Liverpool (2012), and the National Eisteddfod of Wales, Visual Arts Exhibition (2012).

Solo exhibitions include: Le Lieu Centre en Art Actuel, Quebec (2001); Chapter Arts Centre, Cardiff (2005); The Drawing Center, New York (2006); Artspace, Sydney, (2007); Spacex Gallery, England (2008); The Lab, New York (2009); Millennium Court Arts Centre, Northern Ireland (2009); GTgallery, Belfast; St Paul St. Gallery, Auckland (2011); St David's Hall, Cardiff (2012); Warning Contemporary Art, Belfast (2012); Oriel Myrddin, Carmarthen, and at the Leeds College of Art Gallery.

BBC News stated that "Stitt is considered to be one of Europe's foremost interdisciplinary artists." He has worked as a live artist since 1976, presenting his work in galleries, festivals, alternative venues and sites throughout the world. Stitt is identified with a strain of interdisciplinary art relating more to visual art and action, identified in his work as "akshun".

==== White Trash Curry Kick controversy ====
Stitt gained national attention in 2003 over his artwork White Trash Curry Kick, part of a series of nine live artworks he was commissioned to carry out entitled The Bedford Project. It was reported by the BBC on their news website as "Artist gets a kick out of curry". The performance, in which Stitt was to kick a carton of take-away curry through Bedford town center on a Saturday night, was eventually cancelled because of crowd safety fears.

=== Painting ===
Although his reputation was founded on his career as a live interdisciplinary artist, Stitt originally trained as a painter. In recent years he has re-focused on the materials, processes and performance of painting. His recent painting work conveys a tangible sense of physical and spatial tension, capturing the surface world and the abstract or cognitive one behind it. In 2008 he was awarded the Creative Wales Award from Arts Council of Wales to develop his painting practice, and has since radically changed his output to painting.

=== Music ===
Stitt was a member of the punk rock band Ask Mother (1977–1980) and is a member of The Panacea Society. Ask Mother are featured on the Ulster punk rock compilation Shellshock Rockers' Vol.ll released by Spit Records in Northern Ireland (2013). The Panacea Society has released several 10" vinyl records and the CD album We Don't Dig Doom (Dogfingers, Texas 2007).

Solo Stitt CD's include Working on The Bypass (ND, Texas, and Locus+ UK, 2004), East Poppyfields (Dogfingers, Texas, 2004) and Easter (Offmusic/Tamtoto, Europe, 2004).

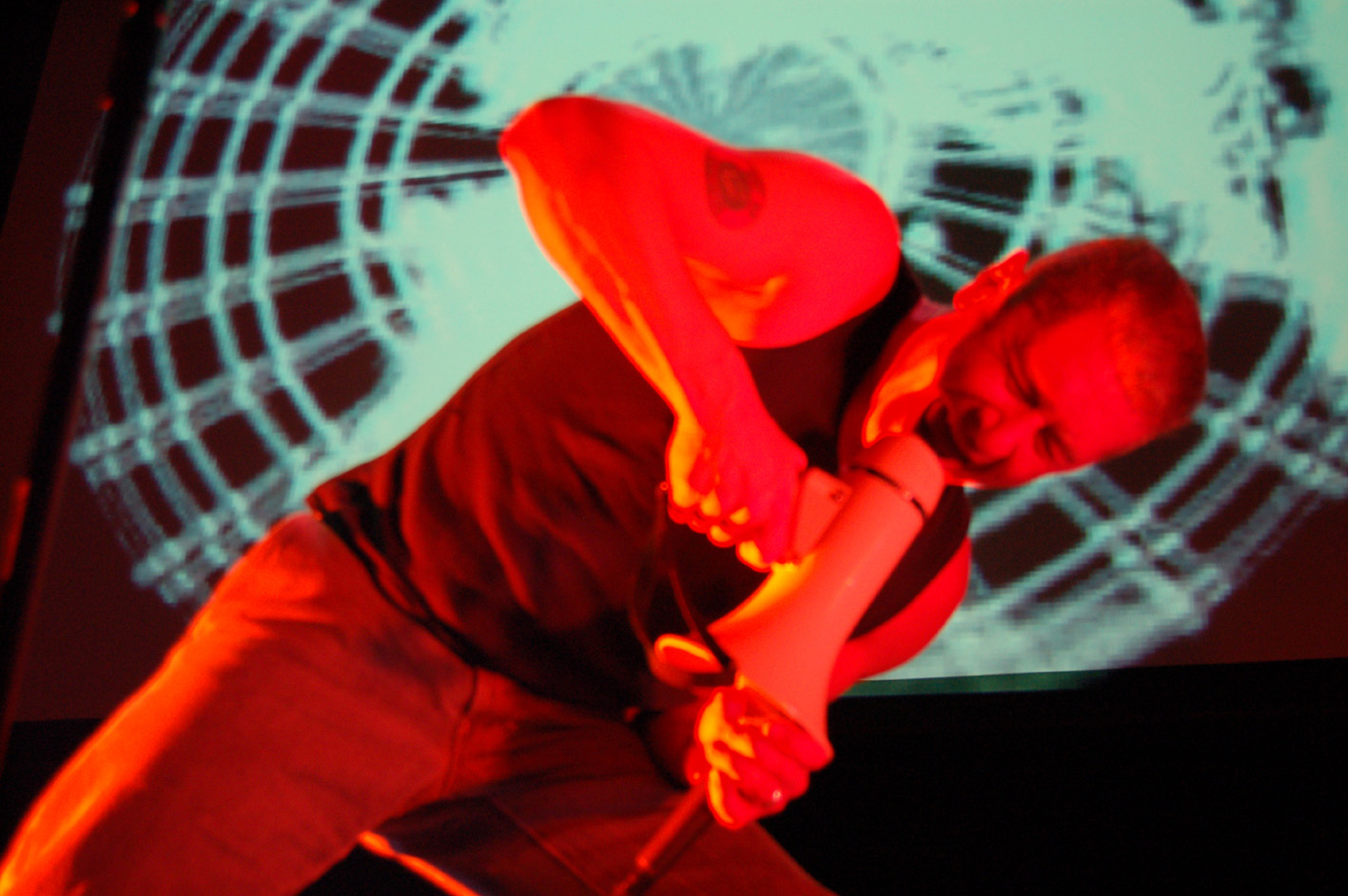
André Stitt with The Panacea Society, US tour (2006)

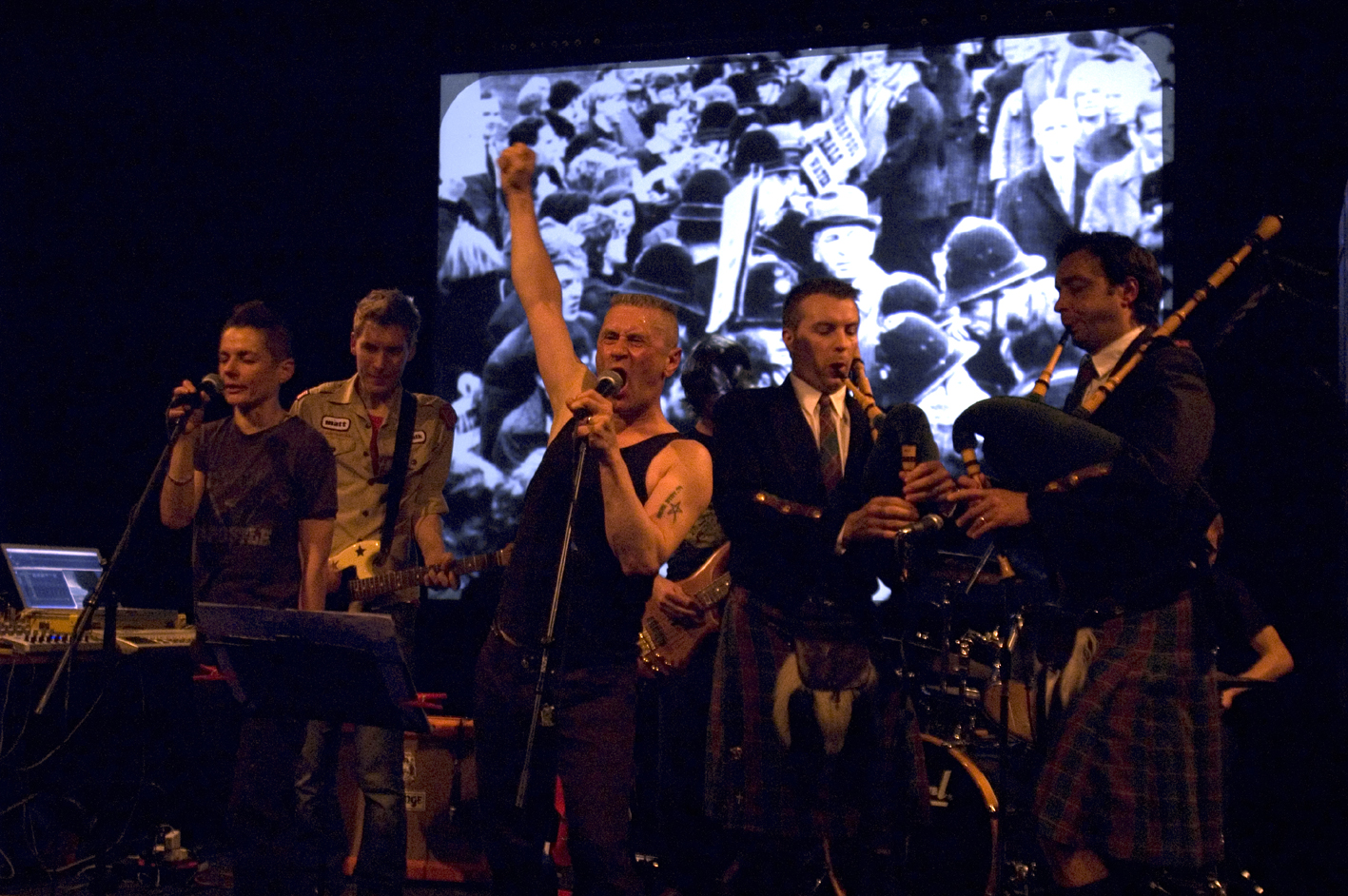
André Stitt with The Panacea Society (2007)

== Bibliography ==
- Pearson, M., (2013) in the WEST, Oriel Myrddin, Wales/Cymru
- Stitt, A., (ed.) (2011) TRACE Displaced, Parthian, UK
- Reeve, H., (2010) "'The Friend, Transmission: Host", Artwordspress, London
- Stitt, A., (2010) Belfast Akshun Map, GT Gallery, Belfast
- Welsh, F., Stitt, A., (2009) SHIFTwork, Curcioprojects, New York
- McKeown, J. Johnston, M. Stitt, A., (2009) Everybody Knows This Is Nowhere, MCAC, Portadown
- Roms, H., Hood, N., Stitt, A (2008) Substance, Spacex, Exeter
- Hewlett, C., Stitt, A., (2008) '"The Institution", LiveArtWork DVD edition 7, Berlin
- French, B.,(ed.), (2007) Dingo, Artspace, Sydney
- Stitt, A., (ed.) (2006) TRACE 00'05, Seren, Wales
- Stitt A., (2005) The Institution, Chapter, Cardiff
- Home, S., Charley, J., Stitt A. (2005) Reclamation, Chapter, Cardiff
- Stitt, A., (2004) Cargo Cult, Café Gallery Projects, London
- Stitt, A., (2002) South of No North, Sirius Art Centre, Cork, Ireland.
- Hunter, R., Stitt, A., Locus+ (ed.) (2002) Small Time Life, London: Black Dog Publishing
- Pokoyski, D., Stitt, A., (ed.)(2000) Homework: Scores, Statements & Notes for Akshun 1976–2000, Cologne: Krash Verlag.

== See also ==
- Performance art
- List of Northern Irish artists
- List of Fellows of the Royal Society of Arts
