= Art in Cardiff =

Overview of visual arts of Cardiff, UK

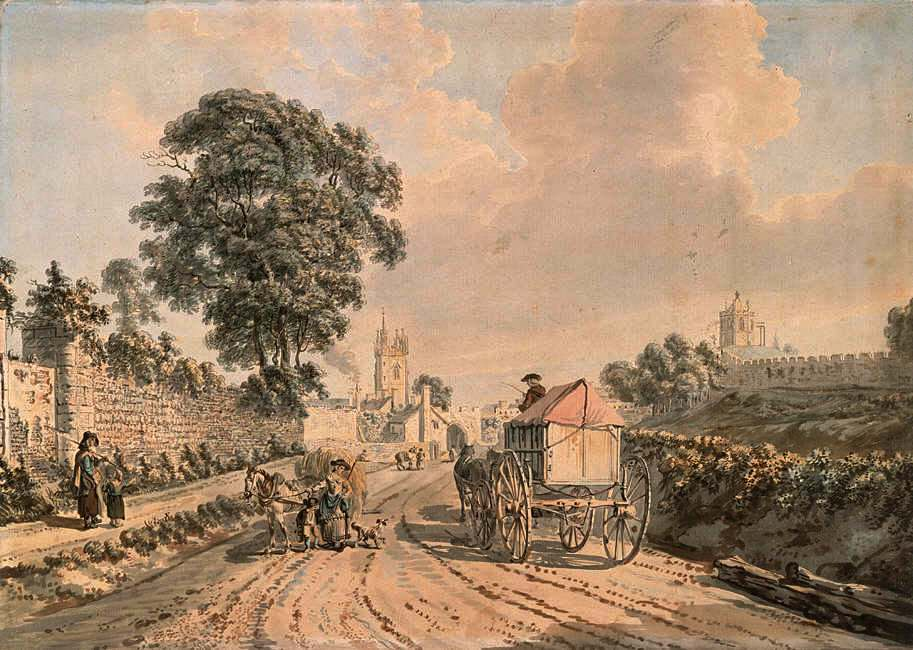
The North Gate, Cardiff by Paul Sandby (c. 1773)

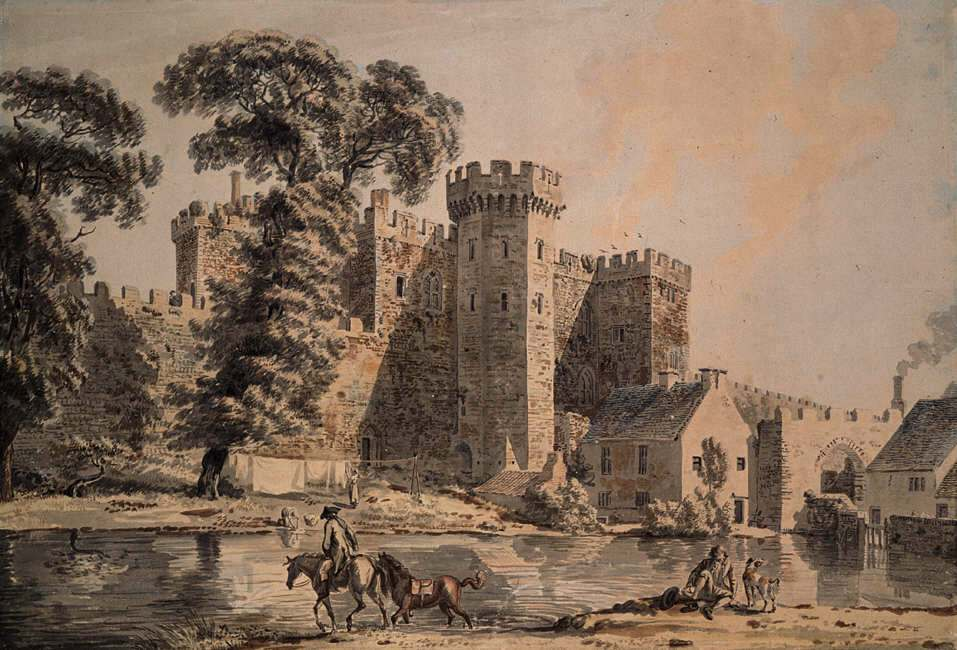
The West Gate, Cardiff by Paul Sandby (c. 1773)

Art in Cardiff refers to the culture of visual arts in Cardiff, capital city of Wales. The visual arts in Cardiff have a much more recent history than many British cities, due to it being a very small town until rapid growth took place in the mid nineteenth century. Cardiff School of Art originated in 1865 and the first major public art exhibition took place in 1870. The town became a city in 1905, after which time it gained further importance, for example with the creation of a new National Museum. Into the 21st century it has a thriving art scene.

== Background ==
Cardiff did not become a large town until rapid industrial expansion took place during the second half of the nineteenth century. Artists had visited the town from an earlier date, particularly Paul Sandby (1725/6-1809) painted a number of watercolours of South Wales during his second tour of Wales (1773, published 1775), including of Cardiff's North and West Gates. Wales was unusual because its concentration of visual artists occurred in rural areas (rather than urban centres), drawn there by the impressive scenery. The Cambrian Academy of Art was founded by artists in the Conwy Valley and Betws-y-Coed and art was exhibited at established commercial galleries in Llandudno, on the North Wales coast.

== Late 19th century ==
In 1858 the idea of a town museum for Cardiff had been raised and, in 1861, a museum was created in temporary rooms based on subscriptions, sharing accommodation with the Cardiff Free Library in St Mary Street. In 1870 Cardiff's first large-scale public art exhibition, the Fine Art and Industrial Exhibition, took place. Bequests to the art collection, particularly sculpture (for example from Milo ap Griffith) began to come in.

Central to the town's artistic community at the time were artist T. H. Thomas (1834–1915) and architect Edwin Seward (1853–1924). Thomas exhibited at the 1870 exhibition. Seward studied at Cardiff's College of Art and later designed the town's new Free Library on The Hayes. Both became Presidents of the Cardiff Naturalists' Society and when Thomas inherited a house on The Walk in 1880 this also became a place for intellectual discussion. Seward tried unsuccessfully to establish an art institution in Cardiff to represent the whole of Wales. Exhibitions were held in 1884 and 1885 to raise money for a headquarters for the Cambrian Academy. Instead, Seward and a group of artists created the South Wales Art Society in 1888, with an annual exhibition and lecture programme.

To help fund a new Free Library a second Fine Art and Industrial Exhibition took place in Cardiff's Drill Hall in 1881. T. H. Thomas and Cardiff painters B. S. Marks and Richard Short were on the organising committee. The event attracted further donations to the town's art collection, including the entire collection of William Menelaus after his death in 1882. In 1883 the National Eisteddfod visited Cardiff and Thomas organised the art and craft exhibition and competition, the largest ever event of its kind in Wales at the time. Local painter Edgar Thomas came to the attention and the Marquess of Bute sponsored his continuing art education as a result.

Discussions began in the early 1890s to create a far larger museum and art gallery for Cardiff. The idea that it became a national museum was soon mooted, to rival those in England and Scotland. A site was secured at Park Place for the new building, and the design commissioned from Edwin Seward. In 1896 Cardiff's third Fine Art and Industrial Exhibition took place (with the pavilion designed by Seward), which further brought together a substantial public collection of art, for example from the works of painter Charles Jones (d. 1892). Plans for a new museum were superseded by grander ambitions for new civic buildings on a much larger site, and it was not realised until after Cardiff achieved city status (1905). Seward's designs were used for the application for government funds, but not used for the final building.

== Cardiff School of Art ==
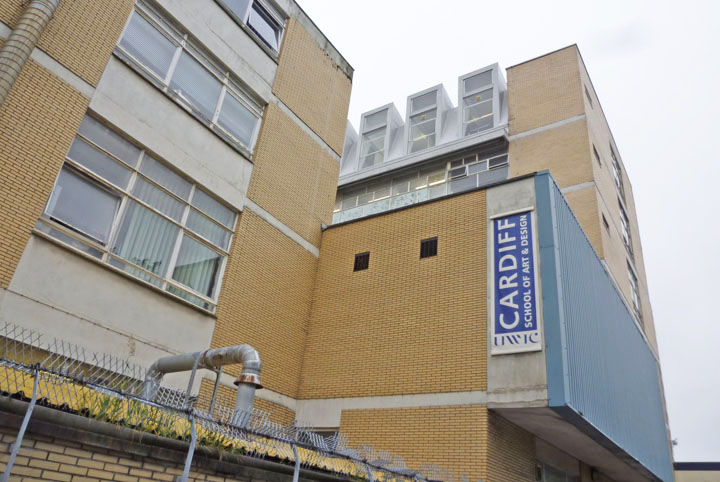
Art College at Howard Gardens

A School of Science & Art was established in Cardiff in 1865, with lessons taking place on the top floor of the Cardiff Free Library and Museum. In 1867 a distinct School of Art was formed, based on the Art Night School. The first South Kensington examinations took place (and prizes awarded) in 1868 (in 1869 the prizes were handed out by Lord Bute). It became the Cardiff Technical School in 1889 (and eventually Cardiff College of Art in 1949).

A purpose built city centre site was opened in May 1970 in Howard Gardens. This was closed in 2014 as the remaining courses were moved to Cardiff Metropolitan University's newly built art college building in Llandaff, bringing all the art and design courses together for the first time in decades.

== National Museum of Wales ==
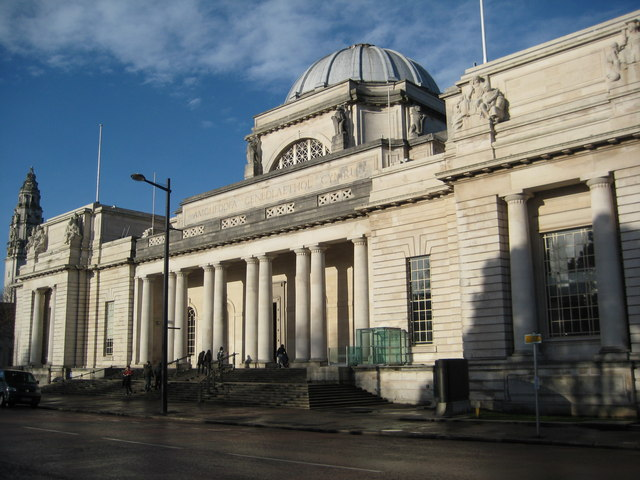
National Museum, Cardiff

National Museum Cardiff, formerly known as the National Museum of Wales, is a museum and art gallery in Cardiff, Wales. The museum is part of the wider network of Amgueddfa Cymru – Museum Wales. Entry is kept free by a grant from the Welsh Government.

== Art Groups ==
=== South Wales Art Society ===
The South Wales Art Society (SWAS) was formed in 1888 by a group of Cardiff-based members of the art scene, including artists T. H. Thomas and Parker Hagarty, art collector James Pyke Thompson, architects J. A. Sant and Edwin Seward and watercolourist Clarence Waite. SWAS planned to have an annual exhibition, a lecture programme and a sketching club and "offering to those who admire or appreciate, rather than practise, a means of cultivating a taste for Art".

SWAS has continued to hold an annual exhibition in a variety of locations in Penarth and Cardiff. Its 100th exhibition took place at the Turner House Gallery, Penarth and its 127th took place in the Pierhead Building, Cardiff Bay in 2014.

=== 56 Group ===
The 56 Group was conceived in 1956 by a small group of Cardiff-based artists, Eric Malthouse and David Tinker (who both worked at the Art College) together with Michael Edmonds (an artist/architect). The name 56 Group was conceived at a meeting in a Llandaff pub and the loose organising committee was based in Cardiff. However the group had national ambitions to promote radical and abstract Welsh art and its other founding members were associated with areas outside of Cardiff, such as Newport, Carmarthen, Aberystwyth and the Rhondda valleys.

== Arts centres and galleries ==
=== Private galleries ===
A small number of private art galleries continue to operate in Cardiff. Art in Wales: an illustrated history 1850–1980 describes the standard of exhibitions in Wales private galleries as "uneven", but singles out the Howard Roberts Gallery in Cardiff as one of the "two outstanding private galleries in Wales".

The first private art gallery, called the Cardiff Gallery, opened in 1953 but only lasted a year or two. In 1956 the Howard Roberts Gallery was created by artist Howard Roberts in four large rooms on St Mary Street. The gallery exhibited established Welsh painters and helped develop the careers of others. It became known as a centre for modernism, signing Ceri Richards and John Piper to its books. The gallery was eventually forced to close in 1970, but left a legacy of art bequests to major Welsh galleries.

Other notable private galleries include the Albany Gallery, Roath, which was opened in 1965 by Mary Yapp and became the agent for Kyffin Williams.

Martin Tinney had managed a gallery in Jacobs Antiques Market in the city centre, since 1989, but in 1992 opened the Martin Tinney Gallery in Windsor Place, specialising entirely in Welsh art. In 2002 the gallery moved to St Andrews Crescent. It represented major Welsh artists such as Shani Rhys James. When Tinney retired the gallery closed, in March 2023. In November 2023 former Martin Tinney Gallery manager, Myfanwy Shorey, opened a new gallery, Gallery Celf, in Roath, with the ambition of establishing the area as Cardiff's "gallery district".

g39 is an artist led gallery and community resource which started in Wyndham Arcade, Mill Lane, Cardiff in 1998. It took its name from that first location - g for gallery / galeri and 39 Wyndham Arcade. It moved to larger premises in Roath in 2011 after the city centre underwent redevelopment. g39 is currently run by Cinzia Mutilgi and Anthony Shapland and currently runs a gallery programme, as well as a cinema, library and artist resource programme.

=== Oriel ===
Oriel was an art gallery and bookshop in Charles Street, founded by the Welsh Arts Council in 1975 as its "Window on the Arts in Wales". It mounted influential exhibitions of contemporary art and had a publishing operation. In the late 1980s it moved to the corner of The Friary and Greyfriars Road. It closed in the 1990s when the Welsh Arts Council withdrew funding.

=== Chapter Arts Centre ===
Chapter is an arts centre in the Canton district of the city which includes two gallery spaces.

== 21st century ==
=== Artes Mundi ===
Artes Mundi is an international biennial contemporary art exhibition and prize, held at the National Museum since 2004.

=== Street art and graffiti ===
The 'Roxe Jam' hip-hop and graffiti festival took place annually from July 2008 in Sevenoaks Park, Grangetown. The event was set up in memory of a young graffiti writer, Bill Lockwood aka Roxe, who was killed in a road accident. The main street art highlight of the event was the legal painting of a 140 m long wall which runs parallel to the Cardiff to Penarth railway line. The festival last took place in 2012.

In October 2013 the Made in Roath collaborated with the Empty Walls project with the intention of painting murals and street art on neglected buildings. The event was brought into Cardiff city centre in 2014. Empty Walls festival sponsored by the Arts Council of Wales took the project to the city centre. The Project was organised by Sam Worthington (Wasp Elder/Colour Doomed) and Helen Bur ( HB) whom formed the arts collective Modern Alchemists, Empty Walls Street Art Festival and the Abacus arts space in Wood Street. It brought together 20 local and international street artists and over 40 murals were painted over the two festivals, together with an indoor exhibition at Abacus.

=== Made in Roath ===
Made in Roath is an annual arts festival held in the Roath district of Cardiff.

Made is Roath is currently directed by Helen Clifford, Clare Charles and Gail Howard.

== Sources ==
- Lord, Peter (2000), The Visual Culture of Wales: Imaging the Nation, Cardiff: University of Wales Press, ISBN 0-7083-1587-9
- Moore, David (2012), A Taste of the Avant-garde: 56 Group Wales, Brecon: Crooked Window, pp. 6–7, ISBN 978-0-9563602-1-2
