= Wales Institute for Research in Art and Design =

Collaborative venture in Wales

Wales Institute for Research in Art and Design (WIRAD) is a collaborative venture founded by the University of Wales Institute, Cardiff (UWIC) and University of Wales, Newport (UWN).

WIRAD supports research excellence in Art and Design within Wales by spreading academic intellect across institutions. The Institute forms a large body of research related to the fields of art, design and media which are competitive with the research quality and intensity achieved by institutions in Scotland, England and Ireland.

Cardiff School of Art and Design and Newport School of Art, Media and Design have been (in various guises) major contributors to the cultural and creative life of Wales for very many years. Both have been home to a number of significant artists and designers and, more recently, nationally and internationally recognised centres of research. The school is rather active with artists recognized around Wales as being some of the best in their fields. The school primarily focuses on Contemporary Arts and Design for Life Science, Health and Wellbeing. WIRAD aims to become Wales' premier Art and Design research institution and an "internationally significant player in the Art & Design research field".

WIRAD operates an "open door" policy because the institute's success is in many ways predicated on the creation of a critical mass of expertise, experience and capacity that does not currently exist. All Welsh Universities and Colleges are invited to apply for membership.

Lecture programmes and research days are held as open events to facilitate dissemination and the development of a wider research community in art and design in Wales.

Associate membership of the institute will be developed for academics, HEIs and other research bodies with established interests in this level of research.
