= Ivor Williams =

Welsh painter (1908–1982)

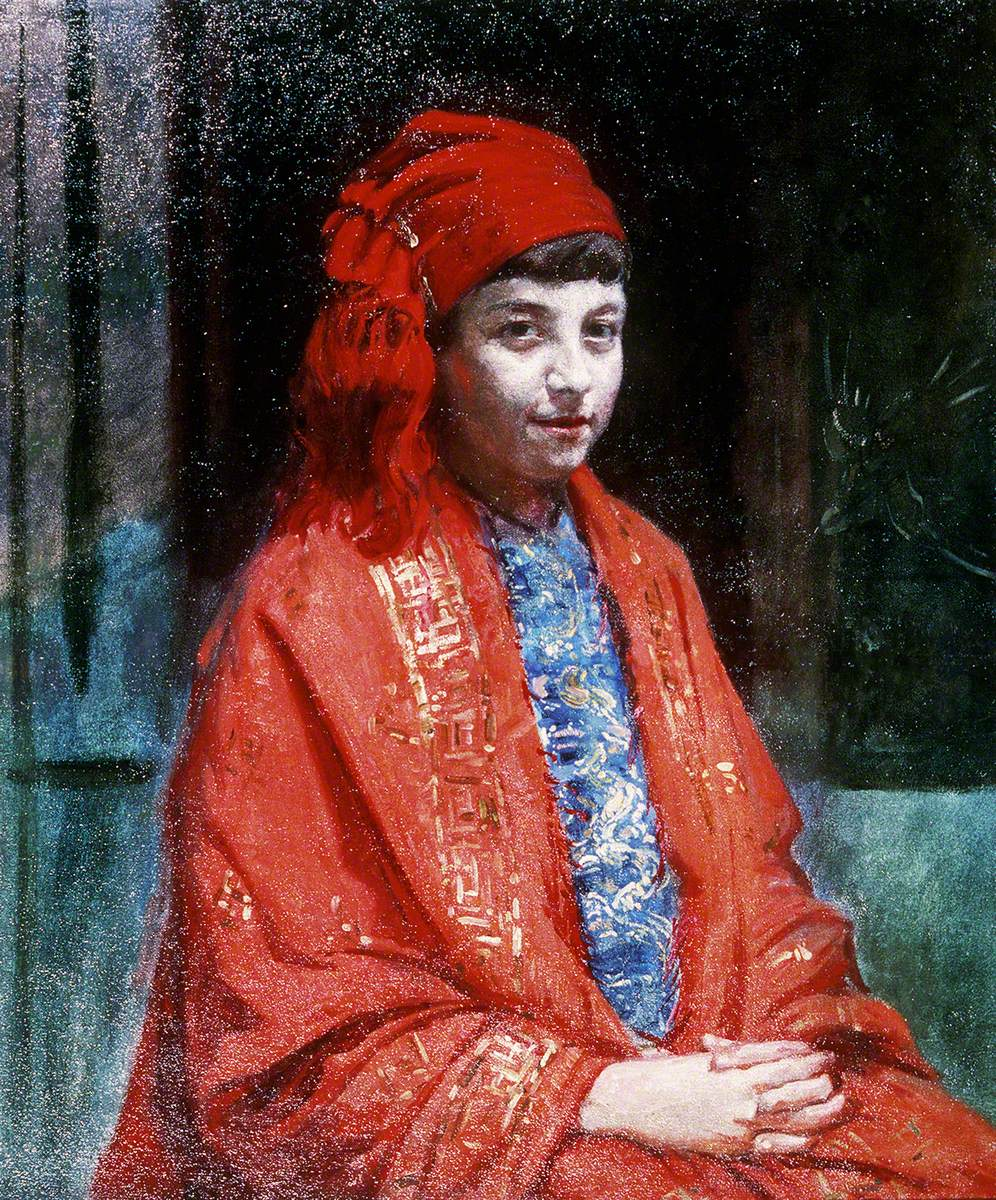
- Portrait of Ivor Williams by his father Christopher Williams
- Born: Christopher Ivor Williams; 15 March 1908; London, England
- Died: 4 December 1982 (aged 74); Llandaff, Wales
- Education: Central School of Art and Design, Slade School of Art
- Known for: Painter

Ivor Williams (1908 – 1982) was a Welsh artist.

He was born in London, the son of the Welsh painter Christopher Williams and Emily Appleyard (sister of the artist Fred Appleyard).

He trained at the Central School of Art and Design and later the Slade School of Art, University of London where he was awarded first prize for portraiture. He shared with his father a particular aptitude for portraiture and large scale figure compositions; biblical and commemorative commissions.

He exhibited regularly in one-man and group shows and contributed to national exhibitions: the Royal Academy, New English Art Club, Royal Society of British Artists, Royal Society of Portrait Painters and the National Eisteddfod of Wales.

His major public works include Field-Marshal Montgomery receiving the freedom of the City of Newport (1945) (now in council chamber at the Newport Civic Centre), The Welch Regiment receiving the freedom of the City of Cardiff (1950), Sir Winston Churchill receiving the freedom of the City of Cardiff (1956) and The Investiture of the Prince of Wales at Caernarfon Castle (1969).

In later years he devoted much of his time working on large religious subjects: The Healing of the Sick of the Palsy (1951–4) (on display at Aberystwyth University), The Leaping Beggar (1960–61), The Raising of Lazarus (1967–9) (both on display at the Bangor University) and The Return of the Prodigal Son.

Throughout his career he remained committed to the development and promotion of Art in Wales. He died in Cardiff at the age of 74.

He married Elizabeth Pocock. Together they had 4 daughters including the artist Annie Williams and the potter Sophia Hughes.

His works are in the collections of the National Museum of Wales, National Library of Wales, Newport Civic Centre, Cyfarthfa Castle Museum, Aberystwyth University, Bangor University and the University of Wales, Lampeter.
