= Chapter Arts Centre =

Arts centre in Cardiff, Wales

Coordinates: 51.48309°N 3.20358°W

- Chapter
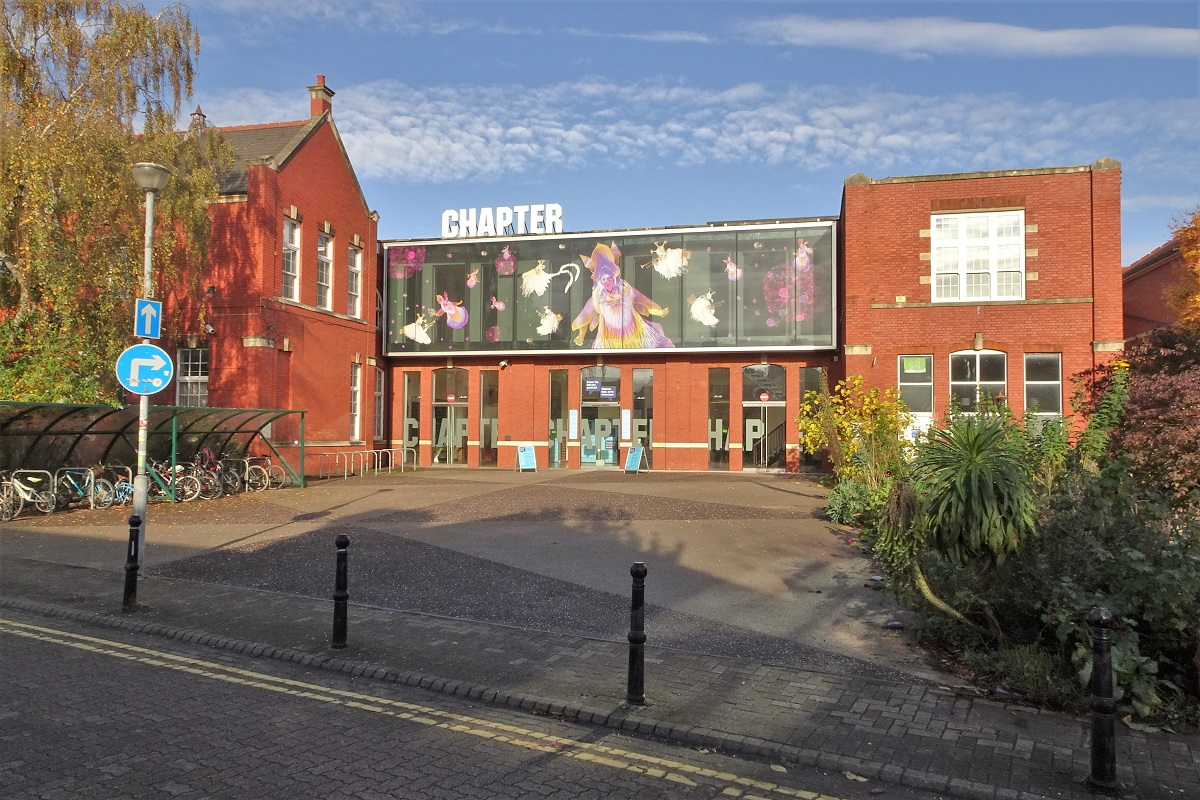
- Front entrance of the venue
- Interactive map of Chapter Arts Centre
- Address: Market Road, Canton; Cardiff; Wales
- Type: Multi-purpose arts venue
- Events: Film screening; Theatre; Art exhibition; Poetry; Live music; Comedy

Construction
- Opened: 1971

Website
- www.chapter.cymru

Chapter Arts Centre (often just referred to as Chapter) is an arts centre in Canton, Cardiff, Wales, opened in 1971.

== Description ==
Chapter hosts films, plays, performance art and live music, and includes a free art gallery, café and bars. There are also over 60 work spaces, used for an eclectic range of purposes including Chapter's own training courses.

Twenty per cent of the centre's income comes from the film theatres. It shows mainstream Hollywood films as well as a considerable array of foreign and independent films on a regular basis.

The centre receives a major annual grant from the Arts Council for Wales.

=== Spaces ===
- Gallery spaces
- Two film theatres (capacities: 188 and 57)
- Two theatres (capacities: 96 and 60 seated, also standing)
- Two bars (ground floor has normal opening hours; upstairs is open for specific events)
- Café
- Shop
- Several spaces for hire (varying sizes)
- Many spaces for ongoing art production, resident artists, etc.

== History ==
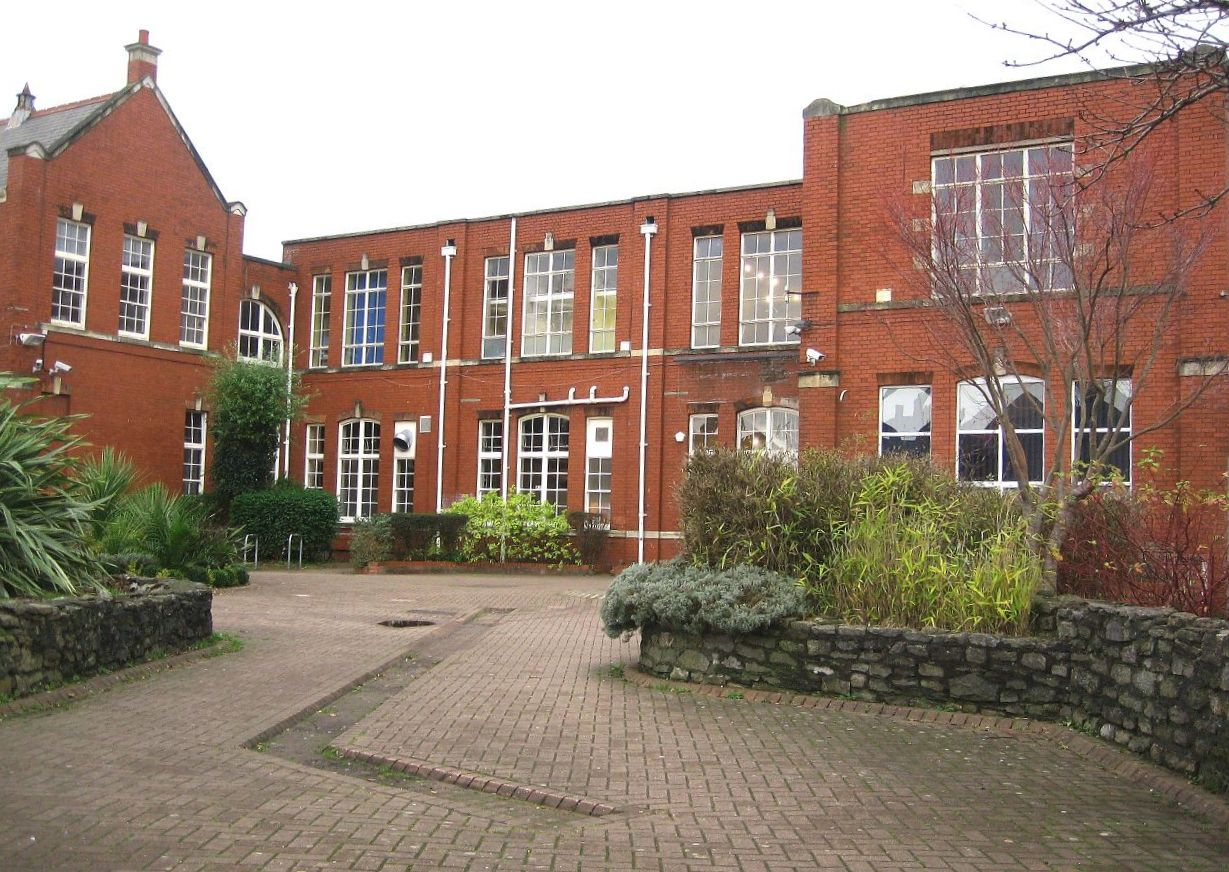
Chapter in 2006, prior to redevelopment

Chapter was founded by Welsh artists, Christine Kinsey and Bryan Jones with journalist Mike Flood and opened in 1971. The building was previously a school, Canton High School, and was built in 1905.

=== 21st century ===
In the 2000s Chapter underwent a £3.8 million redevelopment, designed by architects Ash Sakula Architects, who were appointed in 2006. The practice prioritised remodelling of the public areas on the ground floor, while adding a storey-high 'light box' above the main entrance as an 'artistic billboard'. The centre remained open through the redevelopment and the new Chapter opened in November 2009. The building won a R.I.B.A. Wales Award in 2010. The new open-plan design was described as user friendly with many great details.

Following the centre's refurbishment in 2009, the number of visitors doubled to 800,000 per year, making it the second most popular attraction in Cardiff.

As of March 2014 Chapter installed 60 photovoltaic solar panels to their roof providing up to 15KW of electricity.

In the autumn of 2014 Chapter became a venue for the international Artes Mundi exhibition and art prize, which expanded for the first time beyond the National Museum Cardiff.

In December 2015 Chapter renamed the main Theatre and Stiwdio spaces as Theatr Seligman Theatre and Stiwdio Seligman, following a significant donation from local benefactor David Seligman.

In 2020, BFI London Film Festival changed its format and opened up the festival to a selection of cinemas outside of London. Since then, Chapter has been one of the partner venues of the festival, hosting premier screenings that were previously only available to London audience.

== See also ==
- List of cultural venues in Cardiff
