= Annie Morgan Suganami =

Welsh artist and musician (born 1952)

Annie Morgan Suganami (born 1952) is an artist and musician who trained at the Royal Academy of Music and Cardiff School of Art & Design and now lives and works in Machynlleth, Wales.

== Work ==
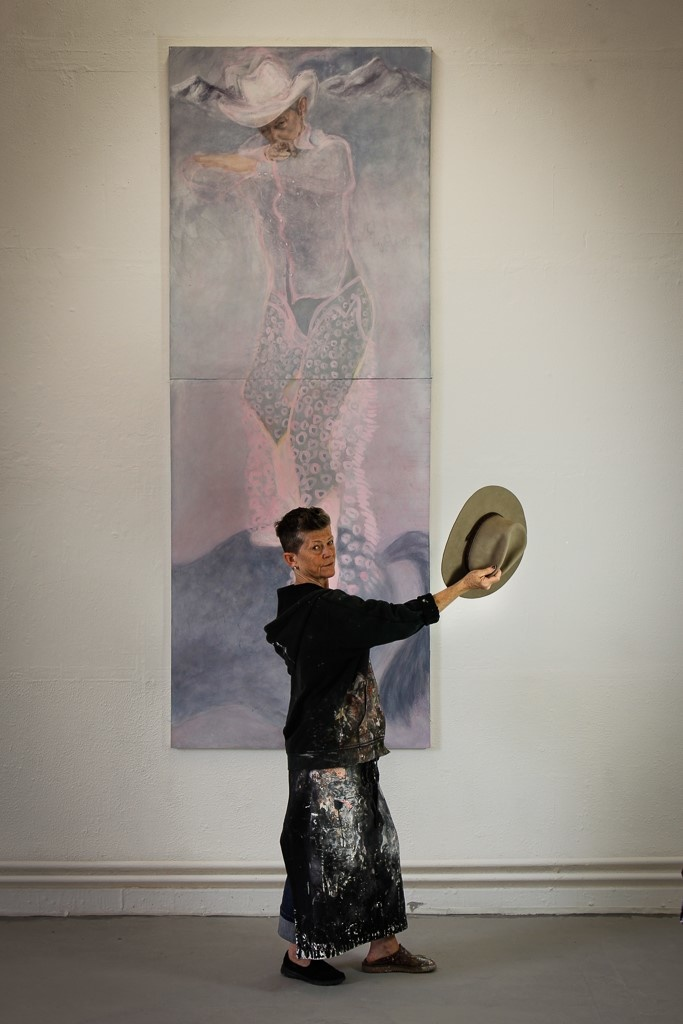
Annie Morgan Suganami with Portrait of the Artist as a Cowboy Entertainer

Suganami's paintings "of vivacity and originality," have included portraits of Welsh poet Menna Elfyn and the Welsh writer Jan Morris. Suganami is "compelled to paint characters emanating tenacity, perseverance, resistance and tenderness – personal icons of endurance in uncertain times." She has exhibited work at the National Eisteddfod of Wales in Anglesey, the 2014 Beep Painting Biennial, and at MOMA Wales in Machynlleth. She was artist in residence at Oriel Brondanw in 2018 and is represented by Gallery TEN, Cardiff.

As a member of Welsh music group Cusan Tan, Suganami recorded the album Cusan Tan on Wales’ Fflach label, which was released in the U.S. in 1994 by Firebird Music of Portland. Sain Recordings released the album Yr Esgair in 2000.
