= Michael Edmonds (artist) =

British artist and architect

Michael Edmonds (9 April 1926 – 30 March 2014) was a British artist and architect born in Dorset, England but with strong connections to Wales. He was a co-founder of the 56 Group Wales.

== Life and work ==
Edmonds, an only child, grew up in the countryside near Wareham, Dorset. He was educated at Kings School, a boarding school in Somerset, then studied at the Royal West of England School of Architecture, Bristol. As a 'Bevin boy' working in the coal mines to aid the war effort, he came to South Wales. In 1951 he married Thelma Seager, from Cardiff, and they settled in Penarth to bring up a family.

As an architect Edmonds worked in South Wales (initially for the National Coal Board in Cardiff), London and private practice in Kent until his retirement in 1979. He had also studied art at Cardiff College of Art during the late 1940s and subsequently created a number of experimental constructions of modern materials (such as fibreglass). In 1956 he co-founded the 56 Group in Cardiff with artists Eric Malthouse and David Tinker. The Group intended to promote Welsh radical and abstract modern art (and successfully did so into the 21st century). In 1957 an abstracted landscape Summer Fields was included as one of the 'Young Artists of Promise' in Jack Beddington's book. Edmonds continued to receive commissions for church fonts, murals and crosses until the late 1960s, when he had to prioritise his architecture work. Notable artworks included a sculpture in metal, resin and fibreglass for Penarth's Trinity Methodist Church and a 9-metre ceramic mural (1959) for the pneumoconiosis unit at Llandough Hospital. An oil painting, Bessemer (1955) is now in the collection of the University of South Wales.

He returned to Wales in 1984 to live in Montgomery, Powys. In 2001 he joined the Watercolour Society of Wales.

In 2013 his memoirs, War Underground, recounting his time in the mines near Caerphilly during World War II, written in the 1940s then left for 70 years in a drawer, were published by the South Wales Record Society.

== Sources ==
- Moore, David (2012), A Taste of the Avant-garde: 56 Group Wales, Brecon: Crooked Window, ISBN 978-0-9563602-1-2
