= Lizzie Farey =

- Born: 1962 (age 63–64); Singapore
- Known for: Weaver of willow, artist in wood

Lizzie Farey (born 1962) is a contemporary willow sculptor and artist based in the Stewartry in Galloway, Scotland. She designs and creates wall sculptures and 3D forms using her own grown and harvested willow, as well as other local woods such as ash, hazel, birch catkins and larch.

Her work is inspired by the natural landscape that surrounds her home and studio, and draws on influences from Japan in her approach to capturing the simplicity, practicality and beauty of the materials.

== Early life and education ==
Farey was born in 1962 in Singapore. She studied at Canterbury College of Art and Cardiff College of Art. She turned to basketry in 1991, learning from her sister-in-law in North Wales.

== Influences ==
According to Farey she is influenced by the "hills, lochs, larch and heather" of the Galloway countryside where she lives and works. She is beholden to the cycles of nature, growing willow in nearby farmer's fields and collecting ash and other materials from the hedgerows.

== Achievements and commissions ==
In 2007 Farey was awarded the Scottish Arts Council's Creative Development Award. Her work has been exhibited by BrownGrotta Arts in the US, Sotheby's in New York and London, and the Victoria and Albert Museum. Her work The Cutting Edge is in the permanent collection of the National Museum of Scotland, Edinburgh. Farley's work was included in City Art Centre, Edinburgh, Scotland travelling exhibition Spirit of Air,
