= Valerie Miles (artist) =

Welsh artist (1914–1999)

- Born: Valerie Sweet; 1914; Aberkenfig, Wales
- Died: 1999 (aged 84–85)
- Education: Cardiff School of Art
- Known for: Painting, illustration

Valerie Miles née Sweet (1914–1999) was a Welsh artist and illustrator.

== Biography ==
Miles was born at Aberkenfig in south Wales and studied at the Cardiff School of Art between 1932 and 1938. Miles obtained several commissions to illustrate children's books and also painted portraits of children and adults plus animal paintings, most notably of dogs. She was an active member of, and exhibitor with the Pekinese Society of Wales. Her landscape paintings were centred around her home at Gwaelod-y-Garth near Cardiff. Miles was a member of the South Wales Art Society and participated in a number of their group exhibitions, in exhibitions at the Oriel Cardiff and in Arts Council of Wales shows.
