= Joan Baker (painter) =

British artist, teacher (1922–2017)

- Born: 1922; Cardiff
- Died: 2017 (aged 94–95)
- Education: Cardiff School of Art

Joan Elizabeth Baker (1922 – 7 April 2017) was a British painter and art teacher. She taught painting at Cardiff College of Art from 1945 until 1983, being the first woman to run a major art department in Wales.

Educated at Howell's School, Llandaff and then Cardiff School of Art from 1939, she studied under Evan Charlton and Ceri Richards. Baker completed a number of mural commissions, notably for the Cardiff Overseas Club in 1946 and for Ely Primary School in 1952. She exhibited rarely, but did take part in some group shows, notably Six Cardiff Artists in 1953 in Cardiff and, also in 1955, at the Glynn Vivian Art Gallery in Swansea. Focussing mostly on teaching, her pupils included Ernest Zobole.

After retiring from teaching in 1984, Baker continued to paint and exhibit. She died in 2017, aged 94, in the house in which she had been born.
