= Christine Kinsey =

Welsh artist (born 1942)

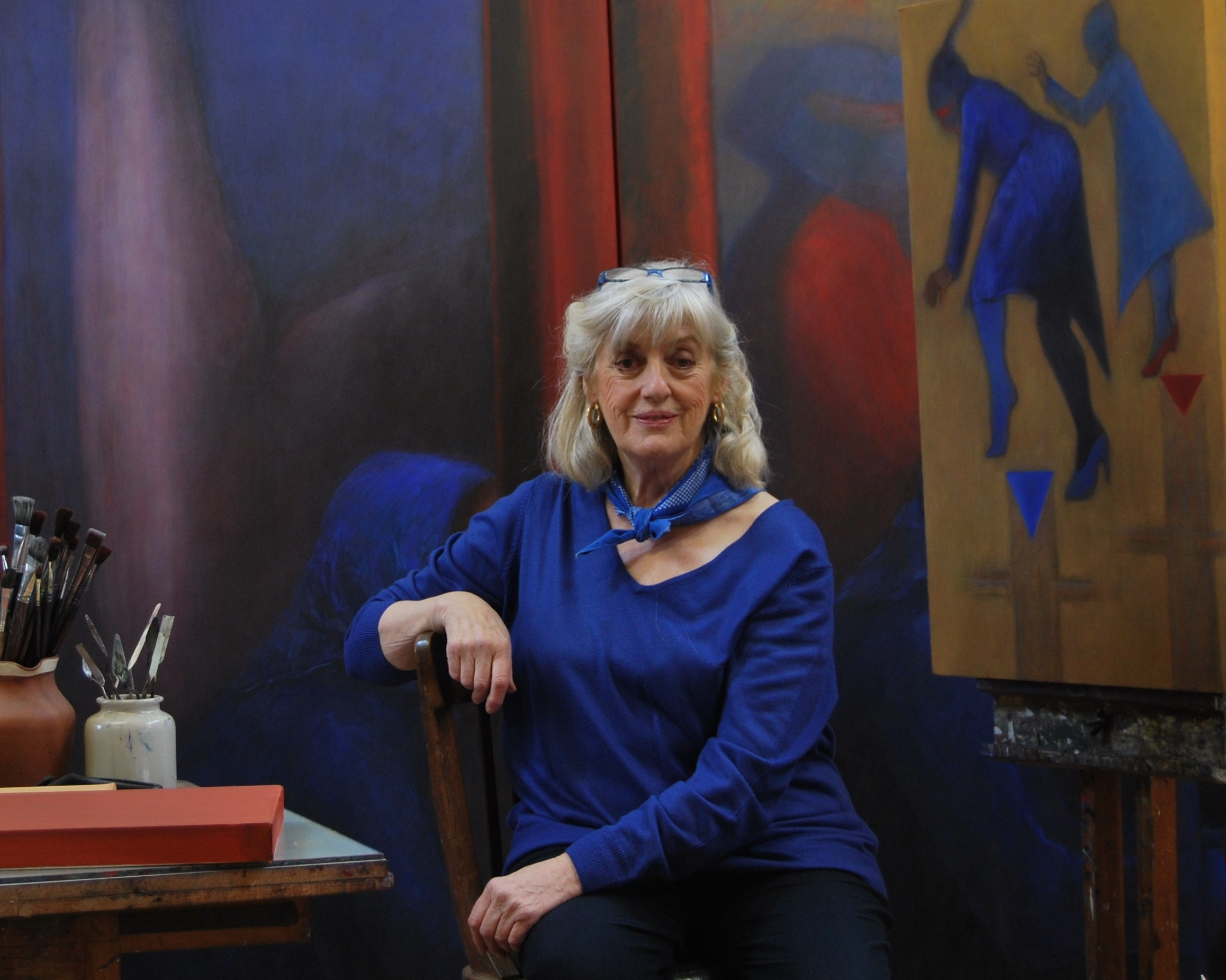
- Born: 1942 (age 83–84); Pont-y-moel

Christine Kinsey (born October 1942) is a Welsh artist, author and curator, now based in Pembrokeshire. She was the co-founder and artistic director of Chapter Workshops and Centre for the Arts, Cardiff, now called Chapter Arts Centre.

== Biography ==
Christine Kinsey was born October 1942 in Pont-y-moel.

== Career and practice ==
Kinsey has developed a group of female characters who emerge repeatedly in her paintings. These characters enact roles within the themes that she explores in her work including what it was like to grow up female in the industrial valleys of south east Wales; and Cymreictod (a sense of feeling, being Welsh). Her touring solo show, Cymreictod – Women of Wales (1989–91), was reviewed in the magazine Spare Rib. Kinsey also examines the depiction of women within a western Christian culture.

Her work is represented in the Victoria and Albert Museum in London, the National Library of Wales in Aberystwyth, Glynn Vivian Art Gallery in Swansea, Contemporary Art Society for Wales in Cardiff, and Newport Museum in Newport.

She was the co-founder and artistic director of Chapter Workshops and Centre for the Arts, Cardiff, now called Chapter Arts Centre.

== Publications ==
=== Books ===
- 2005 Researcher / Co-Editor - Christine Kinsey / Dr. Ceridwen Lloyd-Morgan; Imaging the Imagination; An exploration of the relationship between the image and the word in the art of Wales. Published by Gwasg Gomer, Llandysul. ISBN 1-84323-433-5
- 2022 Curator / Editor – Christine Kinsey; HON Artistiaid Benywaidd yng Nghymru / Women Artists in Wales. A fully bilingual book (Welsh and English) published by The H’mm Foundation, Swansea. ISBN 978-1-9999522-6-6
- 2023 Artist / Author – Christine Kinsey; Truth, Lies & Alibis – Encounters in Images and Words by Christine Kinsey. Published by The H’mm Foundation, Swansea. ISBN 978-1-9999522-5-9

=== Catalogues ===
- 1986 A Pilgrims Progress in Painting and Drawing.
- 1989 Cymreictod-Menywod Cymru / Women of Wales; ISBN 0-9514752-0-7
- 1994 Bywyd Arall / Another Life; Exhibition catalogue ISBN 0-9514752-1-5
- 1999 Meta; Imaging the Imagination; Exhibition catalogue
- 2001 Llais / Voice; Exhibition catalogue
- 2006 Ymddiddan / Colloquy; Exhibition CD Newport Museum and Art Gallery.
- 2014 Correspondences: Contemporary painting in response to the life and writing of R.S. Thomas. ISBN 978-0-9928178-0-0

=== Reviews and articles ===
- 1996 Welsh Books Council magazine. Review of ‘David Jones Maker Unmade’ Derek Shiel and Jonathan Miles and a ‘Fusilier at the Front’ selected by Anthony Hyne.
- 1996 Catalogue statement Student of the Year. Glyn Vivian Art Gallery and Museum, Swansea.
- 1999 Arts and the Welsh Assembly, Western Mail. January 29th
- 1999 Interviewed by Gilly Adams on Chapter Art Centre; Planet Magazine June 1999
- 2003 Review David Jones Journal ‘The Private David Jones’ exhibition Glyn Vivian Art Gallery, Swansea.
- 2005 Book; Imaging the Imagination: An exploration of the relationship between the image and the word in the art of Wales. Published by Gwasg Gomer, Llandysul. ISBN 1-84323-433-5
- 2008/9 De Numine Magazine, The Image and Word / Myth and Imagination in the Art of Christine Kinsey: Alister Hardy Religious Experience Research Centre, University of Wales, Lampeter.
- 2009 Planet Magazine 193 Christine Kinsey A Space of Silent. Belonging / An Artists Diary.
- 2015 Encounters with Osi – Remembering Osi Rhys Osmond. Overviews – On Painting. H'mm Foundation, Swansea. ISBN 978-0-9927560-9-3

=== Images commissioned for book covers ===
- 1995 Just Good Friends – Towards Lesbian and Gay Theology of relationships. Elisabeth Stuart (Mowbray). ISBN 0-264-67328-X
- 2004 Beyond the Difference – Welsh Literature in Comparative Contexts. Editors Alyce von Rothkirch and Daniel Williams (University of Wales Press, Cardiff). ISBN 0-7083-1886-X
- 2005 Vualiuotas Bučinys / Veiled Kiss. Menna Elfyn: (Vaga Vilnius, Lithuania). ISBN 5-415-01786-0
- 2018 Women, Identity and Religion in Wales Theology, Poetry, Story. Manon Ceridwen James, University of Wales Press. ISBN 978-1-78683-193-4
- 2019 Rocking the Boat. Angela V John – Modern Wales Series Editor. Francesca Rhydderch – Parthian, Cardigan. ISBN 978-1-912681-44-0
- 2021 Cyfrinachau / Eluned Phillips. Golygwyd gyda Rhagymadrodd gan Menna Elfyn – HONNO Clasuron. ISBN 978-1-912905-41-6
- 2023 Notes from a Eucharistic Life. Manon Ceridwen James. Cinnamon Press. ISBN 978-1-78864-984-1
