= Annie Williams (painter) =

British artist (born 1942)

Annie Williams (born 1942) is a watercolour artist who won the 2009 Turner Watercolour Award.

== Biography ==
Born in London, the daughter of artist Ivor Williams and Elizabeth Pocock, Williams grew up in Wales and trained and worked as a nurse before studying Fine Art at City and Guilds from 1966 to 1969.

Her later work has been almost entirely still-life. She enjoys playing with shapes, pattern and colour, mixing the familiar with some abstraction, and precision with suggestion. Her foregrounds are a few simple objects, usually pots, and backgrounds are created from textiles or old newspaper cuttings, and even some unfinished paintings as a starting point.

She has had one-woman shows at the Baker Tilly Gallery, Grape Lane Gallery and University of Warwick. Awards include a travel scholarship to Florence, The Artist Magazine Award at the Mall Galleries, and various awards from the RWS open exhibition 21st Century Watercolour. Annie is a Member of the Royal Watercolour Society and a senior fellow of the Royal Society of Painter-Printmakers. She has regularly exhibited at the Royal Academy Summer Exhibition.

In 2013, her exhibition "Still Life: Prints and Watercolours" was held at the University of Aberystwyth.

Williams’s mixed shows included the RA Summer Exhibition; RWS and RE Opens; Singer & Friedlander/Sunday Times Watercolour Competition; Laing Art Competition; and the provinces.
