= Sadie Allen =

British artist (1930–2017)

- Born: 1930; Barry, Vale of Glamorgan, Wales
- Died: 7 January 2017 (aged 86–87)
- Education: Cardiff School of Art
- Known for: Textile art

Sarah Margaret Allen (1930 – 7 January 2017) was a Welsh artist known for her textile and embroidery work which included a number of public commissions.

== Biography ==
Sadie Allen was born in Barry in the Vale of Glamorgan in South Wales in 1930. She studied at the Cardiff School of Art where she completed qualifications in book illustration and also received her art teachers diploma. She met her future husband Colin Gard Allen (1926-1987) while studying at the Art school. After graduation Allen taught at several schools in Hampshire and the north of England. For ten years she was a senior lecturer in Art and Education at Newcastle Polytechnic and also served as an examiner in Creative Studies for the City & Guilds Board.

As an artist Allen worked in paint, textiles and embroidery. She regularly exhibited at the National Eisteddfod of Wales in the 1960s and also with the Society of Education through Art. Her textile commissions included a memorial hanging for a church at Dacre in Cumbria, a panel for Carlisle Civic Centre and a commemorative piece for the jubilee of the Women's Institute in Cumbria. Allen was a regular speaker at Women's Institute events and also ran courses for the Workers Educational Association. She wrote the book 'Creative Embroidery Collage' in 1977 published by Bell & Hyman Ltd, London.

In 1981, Allen bought a disused chapel in Cumbria which became her working studio and an arts and exhibition centre. From the studio she ran classes in embroidered collage and students travelled to the village from all over Cumbria, the Scottish borders and the North East. The Chapel became one of only two independent 'City & Guild' Centres in the UK. A solo exhibition of her work was held at the Abbot Hall Art Gallery in 1986 and, as well as Abbot Hall, Reading University and Bangor Normal College hold examples of her work.
