= Felicity Charlton =

British artist (1913– 2009)

- Portrait of Felicity Charlton by Evan Charlton
- Born: 1913; Clifton, Bristol, England
- Died: 18 March 2009 (aged 95–96)
- Known for: Painting
- Spouse: Evan Charlton

Felicity Ursula Hartland Charlton (1913 – 18 March 2009) was a British artist known for combining realism and fantasy elements in her paintings often of figures in gardens. Although born in Bristol, Charlton spent the majority of her life working in Wales.

== Biography ==
Felicity Ursula Hartland Charlton was born in 1913 in the Clifton area of Bristol and attended the West of England College of Art in that city. There she met her future husband, the artist Evan Charlton, who was teaching at the college. Charlton moved to Wales in 1938, and throughout World War II worked as an agricultural labourer there.

After the war, she resumed her artistic career and took part in a number of group shows. These included the 1949 Welsh Arts Council exhibition Twenty-Five Paintings by Contemporary Welsh Artists, the 1951 Festival Exhibition of Contemporary Welsh Painting and the National Library of Wales exhibition The Artist in Wales that toured during 1952. A number of solo shows, at Abergavenny in 1973, Bath in both 1989 and 1991 and, in 1993, a retrospective at Newport Museum and Art Gallery followed. She also exhibited with the South Wales Group and at the National Eisteddfod of Wales.

Evan Charlton also based his career in Wales, as an art lecturer in Cardiff, and the couple had a number of joint exhibitions. These included a major retrospective, Evan and Felicity Charlton: Paintings 1937-86 at the Royal West of England Academy in Bristol. Works by Felicity Charlton are held by the Newport Museum, the Glynn Vivian Art Gallery in Swansea and the National Museum Cardiff. The New Hall Art Collection in Cambridge and the Contemporary Art Society for Wales also hold examples.

Charlton died on 18 March 2009.

Cardiff Metropolitan University awards an annual prize, the Evan and Felicity Charlton Travel Award, in memory of the couple.
