= Esther Grainger =

British artist (1912–1990)

- Born: 1912; Cardiff, Wales
- Died: 1990 (aged 77–78)
- Education: Cardiff School of Art
- Known for: Painting, teaching

Esther Margaret Grainger (1912–1990) was a Welsh artist and teacher.

== Biography ==
Grainger was born in Cardiff and attended the Cardiff School of Art from 1928 to 1934. As a student she gave craft lessons to women in the local mining communities and, from 1934 to 1946, worked as a tutor for the National Council for Social Services and organised painting classes and exhibitions at the Pontypridd Settlement in south Wales. There Grainger met Cedric Morris and, in 1942, she spent some time at his East Anglian School of Painting and Drawing. A series of teaching posts followed for Grainger. From 1946 to 1950 she taught at Caerphilly Girls Grammar School, then with the Cardiff Education Authority until 1960 and then, from 1960 to 1975 at Cardiff College of Education.

Throughout her teaching career, Grainger was an active artist who regularly exhibited works in Welsh venues. Her work has been sold at auctions selling pieces for $57-$604 with the record price being $604 of two pieces; the Orchard in Spring and Rocks and Trees. As well as paintings and drawings of the Welsh landscape and buildings she also produced works of embroidery and calligraphy. She was the co-organiser of the art exhibition at the 1950 National Eisteddfod of Wales and also exhibited at the annual Eisteddfod throughout the 1950s. Works by Grainger featured in several touring group exhibitions organised by the Arts Council of Wales. She was a member of, and regular exhibitor with, the South Wales Group and the Watercolour Society of Wales. Numerous solo shows included exhibitions at the Newport Museum and Art Gallery in 1954, at the Canaletto Gallery in 1968, a retrospective at the Minories in Colchester in 1973, at the National Library of Wales in 1975, the Oriel Gallery Cardiff during 1976 and at Manor House Fine Arts, also in Cardiff in 1990. As well as the Arts Council of Wales, the National Museum Cardiff and the University of South Wales hold examples of Grainger's artworks.
