= Joan Oxland =

Welsh artist (1920–2009)

- Born: 1920; Cardiff, Wales
- Died: 2009 (aged 88–89); Cardiff, Wales
- Education: Cardiff School of Art; Wimbledon School of Art; Institute of Education; Academie Julian
- Known for: Landscape painting, teaching

Joan Oxland (1920–2009) was a Welsh artist and teacher.

== Biography ==
Oxland was born in Cardiff and was educated at Cardiff High School for Girls. She studied at the Cardiff School of Art and Wimbledon School of Art before training at the Institute of Education, which was then part of the University of London. After some years teaching in both York and Cardiff, Oxland spent 1962 and 1963 studying at the Academie Julian in Paris. She then returned to teaching as a department head at the Cardiff High School for Girls, before becoming head of the design department at Llandaff College of Education. She held that post until 1972, when she taught at Llanederyrn High School in Cardiff. From 1973, she worked as an artist and tutor for the Workers Educational Association.

During her time as a teacher, Oxland continued to paint and exhibit works, often landscapes of the French regions. She regularly showed works at the Royal Academy in London during the 1950s, and was a member of and occasional office holder with, both the South Wales Group and the South Wales Artists Society. Her work regularly featured in the annual Pictures for Welsh Schools exhibition held at the National Museum Cardiff between 1951 and 1960 and she also exhibited, on at least two occasions at the Welsh National Eisteddfod. During her career, Oxland held a dozen solo exhibitions including at Newport Cathedral in 1964 and at the Chapter Arts Centre in Cardiff during 1974. The Welsh Arts Council, the National Museum of Wales and both Newport and Neath galleries hold examples of her work.
