= Ash Sakula Architects =

British architectural firm

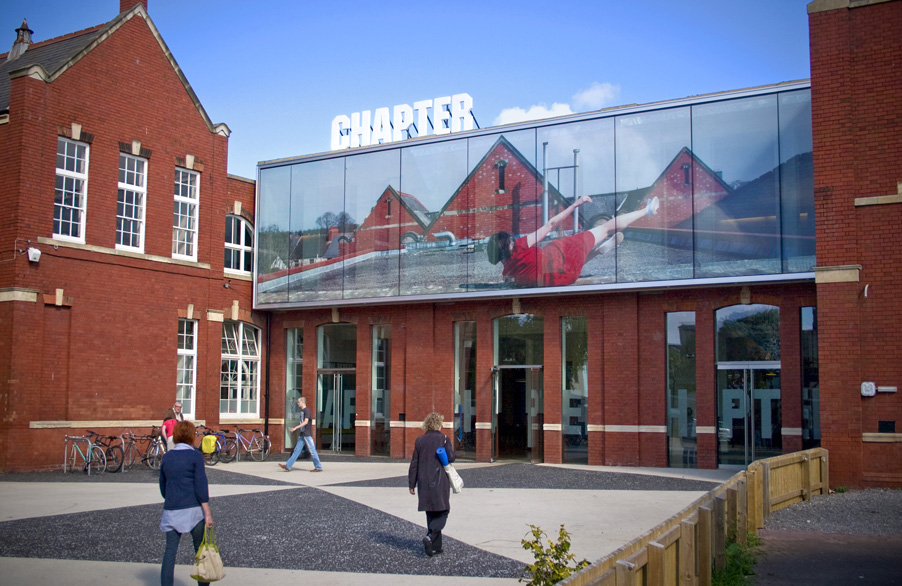
Chapter Arts Centre, Cardiff 2009

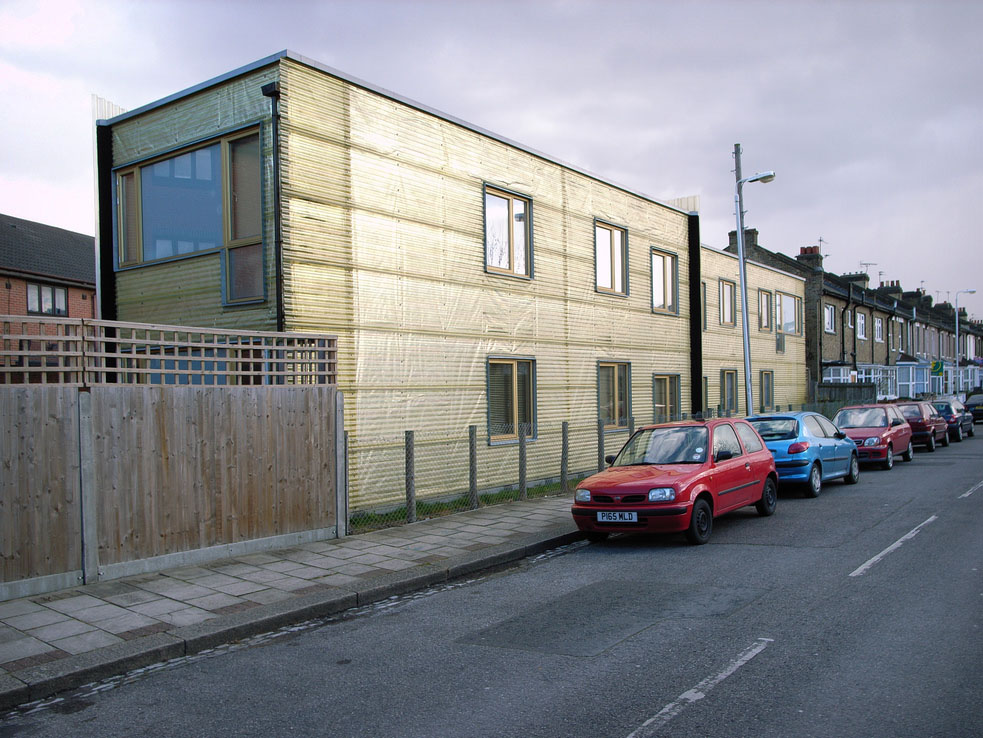
Boxley Street housing, Silvertown, London

Ash Sakula Architects is a small architecture practice based in London, founded in 1996. The practice is known for projects that are community-focused, environmentally sustainable and materials-driven.

Ash Sakula was formed by architects Cany Ash and Robert Sakula. Ash previously worked for the Greater London Council and Burrell Foley Fischer, and in Berlin and New York. She is an external examiner for Cambridge University. Sakula graduated from Liverpool University before working for Sir Clough Williams-Ellis, David Lea and DEGW Architects.

== Key projects and awards ==
- Birdwing Conservatory, London (1997) - the smallest project to ever win a Royal Institute of British Architects (RIBA) Award.
- Leicester Creative Business Depot, Leicester - RIBA East Midland Award winner, 2005.
- Hothouse, Hackney, London - RIBA London Award and Civic Trust Award, 2009.
- Chapter Arts Centre, Cardiff (2009) - RIBA Wales Award 2010.
- The Malings, Newcastle (2014) - Lord Mayor's Design Awards Category Winner 2018, RIBA Award for Architecture 2017, Housing Design Awards Supreme Winner 2016, RICS Regeneration and Residential Awards 2016
- Wickside Regeneration Masterplan (2017) - New London Architecture Awards winner: Masterplans & Area Strategies 2017, New London Architecture Awards winner: Overall winner 2017, New London Architecture Awards winner: Mixed Use Unbuilt 2017, Mipim Future Project Awards 2015 (collaboration with BUJ Architects)
