= Nichola Hope =

British twin artists (born 1975)

Nichola Hope (born 1975) is a Welsh artist. Hope was shortlisted for the David Shepherd Wildlife Foundation Wildlife Artist of the Year 2020, her watercolour Tansy Beetle was awarded the Elizabeth Hosking Prize for Watercolour. She was awarded the RK Burt Painting Prize and has been selected for Wales Portrait I and II, Welsh Artist of the Year in 2006 and the Royal Cambrian Academy of Art.

With her twin sister, Sarah Hope, she produces visual artwork documenting the Welsh National Opera and occasionally paints and draws live. Collectively they have worked on international projects with Monte Carlo Opera, Melbourne Opera, Tasmanian Storytelling Festival and Los Angeles St. David's Day Festival.

Both sisters use pen, ink, and charcoal in their work, while Nichola also has a distinct use of watercolour and oils.

== Early life ==
Nichola and her twin sister Sarah were born in Cardiff, Wales. She is of Welsh and Irish descent, and studied at Winchester School of Art.
