= Evan Charlton =

British painter (1904-1984)

- Detail of Self-portrait: The Caretaker and his Cat (1982)
- Born: 1904; London, England
- Died: 1984 (aged 79–80); Porthkerry, South Glamorgan
- Known for: Painting
- Spouse: Felicity Charlton

Evan Charlton (1904–1984) was a British artist who painted surrealist landscapes and interiors.

== Early life and education ==
Charlton, whose mother was Welsh, was born in London. He studied chemistry at University College, London, where he graduated in 1926. He worked for some time as an analyst for London County Council.

Charlton led a University College fencing team and reached the threshold for Olympic selection in fencing. He painted at least two pictures of fencing, one of which is in the University College London Art Museum.

Charlton's brother George, who was five years older, was a teacher at the Slade School of Art in London. Evan Charlton considered becoming a teacher, so as he awaited acceptance into a teacher preparation programme, his brother extended an invitation for him to spend the summer sketching and painting at the Slade. One of his paintings won the Slade Prize and won him entry to a course at the college, where he studied from 1930 and 1933. His teachers at the college included Henry Tonks, Philip Wilson Steer and Randolph Schwabe.

== Career ==
In 1935 Charlton took a teaching post at the West of England College of Art in Bristol. While at Bristol he met his wife Felicity, who was a student at the college. He left Bristol in 1938 when he was appointed the Head of the Cardiff School of Art. He appointed Ceri Richards as Head of Painting there in 1940.

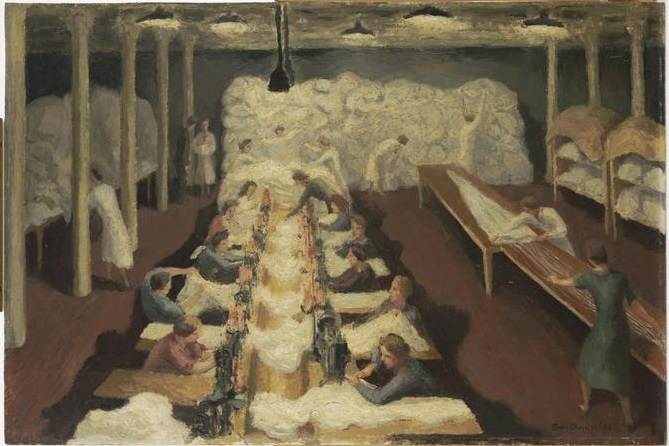
A Parachute Factory (1943), (Art.IWM ART LD 2908)

During World War Two, Charlton worked as a war artist with a series of short-term contracts from the War Artists' Advisory Committee to paint industrial scenes and also some portraits.

In about 1945 Charlton was appointed Her Majesty's Inspector of Art for Wales, inspecting art colleges. In 1962 he was appointed Staff Inspector of Art, with his remit covering all the art colleges in England and Wales. He retired from the Civil Service in 1964.

Charlton continued to paint and draw during his career as a teacher and a college inspector, and in retirement he painted full-time and was able to contribute to a number of exhibitions, including at the Royal West of England Academy, the New English Art Club and the Welsh Arts Council.

Charlton died in Porthkerry, South Glamorgan, where he had lived for several years. A memorial exhibition of his work was held at the National Museum of Wales in Cardiff in 1985. Cardiff Metropolitan University, the successor of Cardiff School of Art, issues the Evan and Felicity Charlton Travel Award annually, in memory of Charlton and his wife, the artist Felicity Charlton.

== Style ==
Charlton painted in a realistic style, and is known for invented landscapes and interiors with a surrealist atmosphere. During his years as an art school inspector he painted privately for himself, isolated from the criticism of the contemporary art world and its preference for abstract and semi-abstract styles. As with many realistic artists of the period, he was influenced by de Chirico, whose work had been exhibited in London in 1928, and the perspectives and architecture in Charlton's work show this influence. Charlton was also influenced by Leonardo and by the old masters in the National Gallery, following their conventions of perspective and composition, with a figure often placed at the golden section.
