= Nathan Wyburn =

Welsh artist and media personality

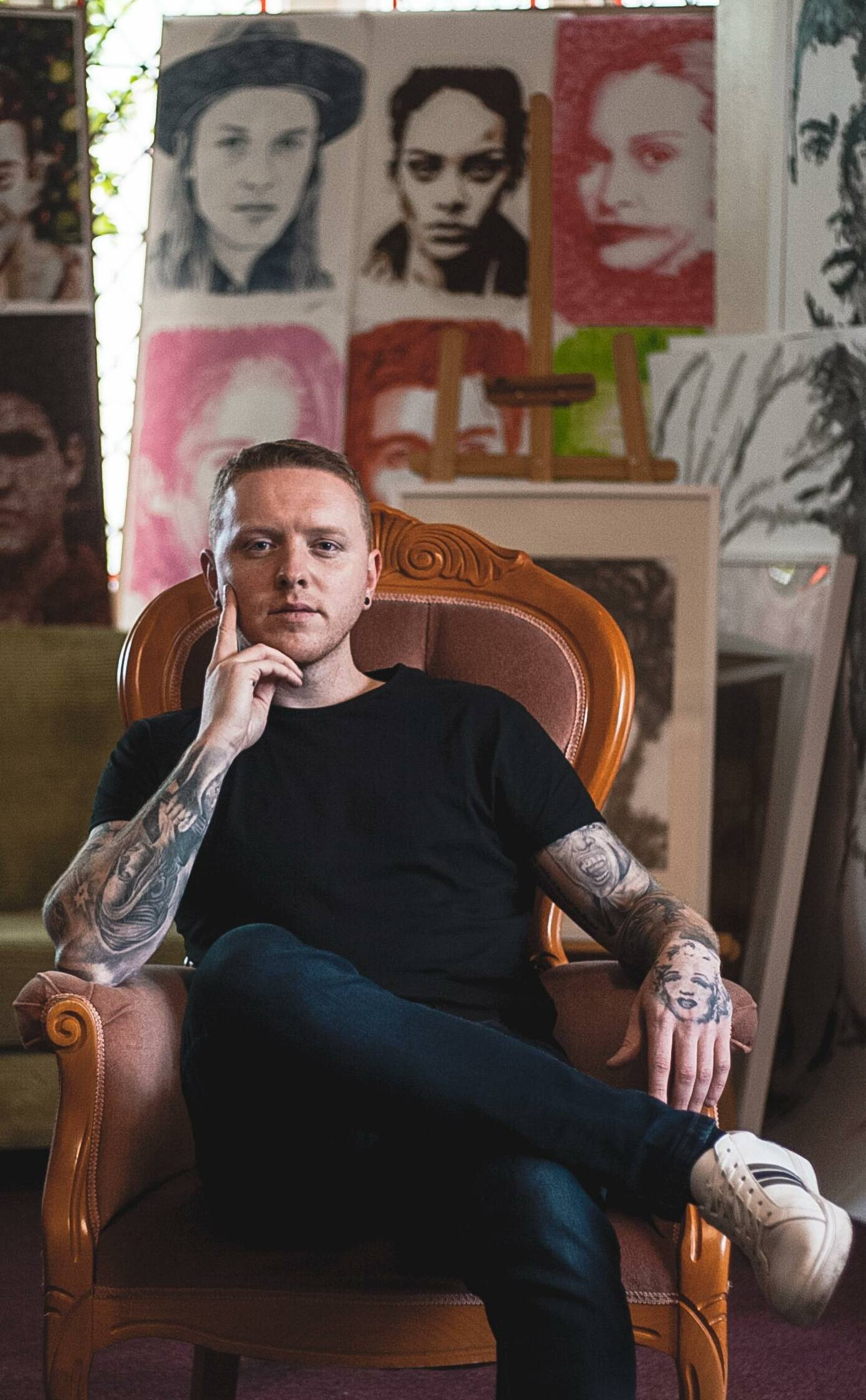
- Wyburn in 2019
- Born: 24 October 1989 (age 36); Ebbw Vale, South Wales, U.K.
- Education: Cardiff School of Art & Design
- Known for: Portraiture, art using food and everyday items
- Movement: Pop art
- Website: nathanwyburn.com

Nathan Wyburn (born 24 October 1989) is a contemporary Welsh artist and media personality who has created celebrity portraits (iconography) and pop culture imagery using non-traditional media such as foodstuffs and other household items, including most notably working with Marmite on toast.

Wyburn has also been a semi-finalist on Britain's Got Talent and on Austria's Die große Chance, and has featured on shows such as NBC’s The Kelly Clarkson Show, ITV's magazine show This Morning and Sky Arts Landmark, where he represented Wales, Britain's Best Young Artist, Sky's Portrait Artist of The Year, Good Morning America plus both Studio10 and The Morning Show in Australia.

He has personally presented works of art to Spider-Man actor Tom Holland, Katy Perry, Prince William & Kate Middleton, King Charles III, Mariah Carey, Dame Shirley Bassey, Sir Tom Jones, Debbie Harry, Sting, Catherine Zeta-Jones, Idris Elba, Cyndi Lauper, Quentin Tarantino, Kylie Minogue and The Jacksons.

== Biography ==
=== Early years ===
Wyburn is from Ebbw Vale, South Wales and studied art both at school, and at the Cardiff School of Art & Design.

In 2010 he posted a YouTube video of himself creating a portrait of TV personality Simon Cowell, made using Marmite on toast. He was featured on the BBC children's TV programme, Blue Peter, ITV News and Sky Sports. He received messages of support from celebrities including singer Katherine Jenkins and pop star Justin Bieber.

=== Britain's Got Talent ===
In 2011 Wyburn appeared on the TV talent show Britain's Got Talent, where he created a portrait of judge Michael McIntyre, again using Marmite on toast. He reached the semi-finals where his portraits of Michael Jackson, Marilyn Monroe and Elvis Presley were judged overambitious. This led to other television appearances such as Daybreak and Lorraine. He created an image of Queen Elizabeth II, as he had missed out on the prize to meet her.

=== 2012–2014 ===
In 2012, during the News International phone hacking scandal, Wyburn's portrait of Rupert Murdoch, made from 5,000 images of alleged phone-hacking victims, appeared on the front page of The Guardian. Wyburn's work was also recognized as part of the London 2012 Olympic Games under Education Relays when he held a one-off edible art exhibition, featuring British Olympians at Bournemouth Arts College. In 2013 he entered the Austrian talent contest, Die große Chance, finishing in the last fifteen and gaining praise from Eurovision winner Conchita Wurst after creating her portrait using glitter. Other international projects included toothpaste art at the '15th International Dental Congress' in Istanbul, portraits of Felix Ketchup fans using the product, a performance on the Spanish version of Don't Stop Me Now and appearing on a short segment in Sky Portrait Artist of the Year.

Following the death of Margaret Thatcher in 2013, Wyburn created a portrait of her using coal.

=== Commercial commissions ===
Brands such as Marmite, Bic, the Famous Company, Oral-B, Costa, Starbucks, Morrisons and Hovis have commissioned Wyburn. His work has been praised by celebrity admirers such as Perez Hilton. In 2014 Wyburn exhibited at the Cardiff Story Museum. Previous exhibitions include Barnabas Arts House and Queens Arcade, Cardiff.

In 2015 Wyburn created a portrait of Princess Charlotte of Cambridge using 1,000 babygrows, a portrait of Welsh rugby international Adam Jones using mud, and for Father's Day pizzas featuring five famous fathers: David Beckham, Tom Fletcher, Gary Barlow Simon Cowell and Marvin Humes, in partnership with Morrisons supermarket.

Wyburn describes himself as having a "Warhol-like obsession" with pop culture and the notion of celebrity, and cites Warhol, Chuck Close and Vik Muniz as his main influences. In an interview with the BBC, Wyburn said of his own work: "It is current to current affairs and current to pop culture. I don't see why that should not be shown in a gallery, in the Tate Gallery or the National Gallery" adding "I do strive to be taken seriously. It would be nice to get that sort of recognition." After learning that he was to be included on the GCSE art curriculum in Wales, he said the possibility of being mentioned in the same lesson as Warhol was "mind-blowing". Wyburn has also been included on the website for Ripley's Believe It or Not! franchise, and on Facebook with videos such as Eminem created with spaghetti.

=== 2015–2018 ===
In 2015 his book Not That Kind of Art, featuring 80 of his works, was published by Candy Jar. In December 2015 Wyburn created portraits of Francis Rossi and Rick Parfitt, from the rock group Status Quo, out of matchsticks, inspired by their 1969 song "Pictures of Matchstick Men". He also created images of Star Wars characters from food products, including lead characters Rey (Daisy Ridley) made from tomato puree and Finn (John Boyega) made from tikka paste.

In 2016, to celebrate the 30th anniversary of the Techniquest science museum, Wyburn created a portrait of scientist Albert Einstein using thousands of Smarties. He also painted a portrait of actor Gene Wilder, using chocolate, as a tribute to the late comic actor. To raise awareness of World AIDS Day on Dec 1st 2016, Wyburn created a red glitter portrait of singer & Queen icon, Freddie Mercury, who died of the disease in 1991.

In 2017, the Welsh language channel S4C, aired seven segments featuring seven artworks being created by Wyburn. These included a painting of Gareth Bale with his feet, Sam Warburton with mud, Zoella with glitter and Johnny Depp as Captain Jack Sparrow created using sand and seaweed on Barry Island beachfront. In May Wyburn created an image of Skepta for the British music company The Famous Company by using images of unsigned artists from around the world.

In November 2017 Wyburn painted a picture of Jesus using a sausage roll and ketchup, in response to an advertisement for Greggs which showed a sausage roll in place of the holy infant on their advent calendars. On New Year's Eve 2017, ITV aired a panel show hosted by Fern Britton titled A Right Royal Quiz which featured a cameo appearance from Wyburn, showcasing some of his royal portraits including a new artwork of The Queen using pizza. This was shortly followed by an ad campaign by Dr Beckmann, a cleaning product company which commissioned the artist to use its carpet stain remover, to make a 20-foot (6.1 m) image of newly engaged Prince Harry and Meghan Markle by removing stains from a dirty carpet.

In 2018 Wyburn created an image of the Mona Lisa in snow at Roath Park in Cardiff, alongside portraits of Jon Snow & Idina Menzel which were featured as a global Twitter ‘moment’. In April Wyburn performed live art at Wales Comic Con weekend where he created several portraits of the special guests, including actor Andrew Scott. In July Wyburn created a portrait of Aneurin Bevan during the 70th anniversary week of the National Health Service. The artwork, Wyburn's largest to date, took some eight and a half hours to complete and was made out of local materials, including 374 kg of garden soil and 74 kg of stone dust. In the same year Wyburn partnered with home improvement store B&Q to recreate a 15-metre (49 ft) replica of the Mona Lisa using leaves and a Bosch leaf blower. Celebrity endorsements in 2018 included Melanie B and Mariah Carey who tweeted saying she "loves this" in reply to his portrait of her.

== Recent work ==
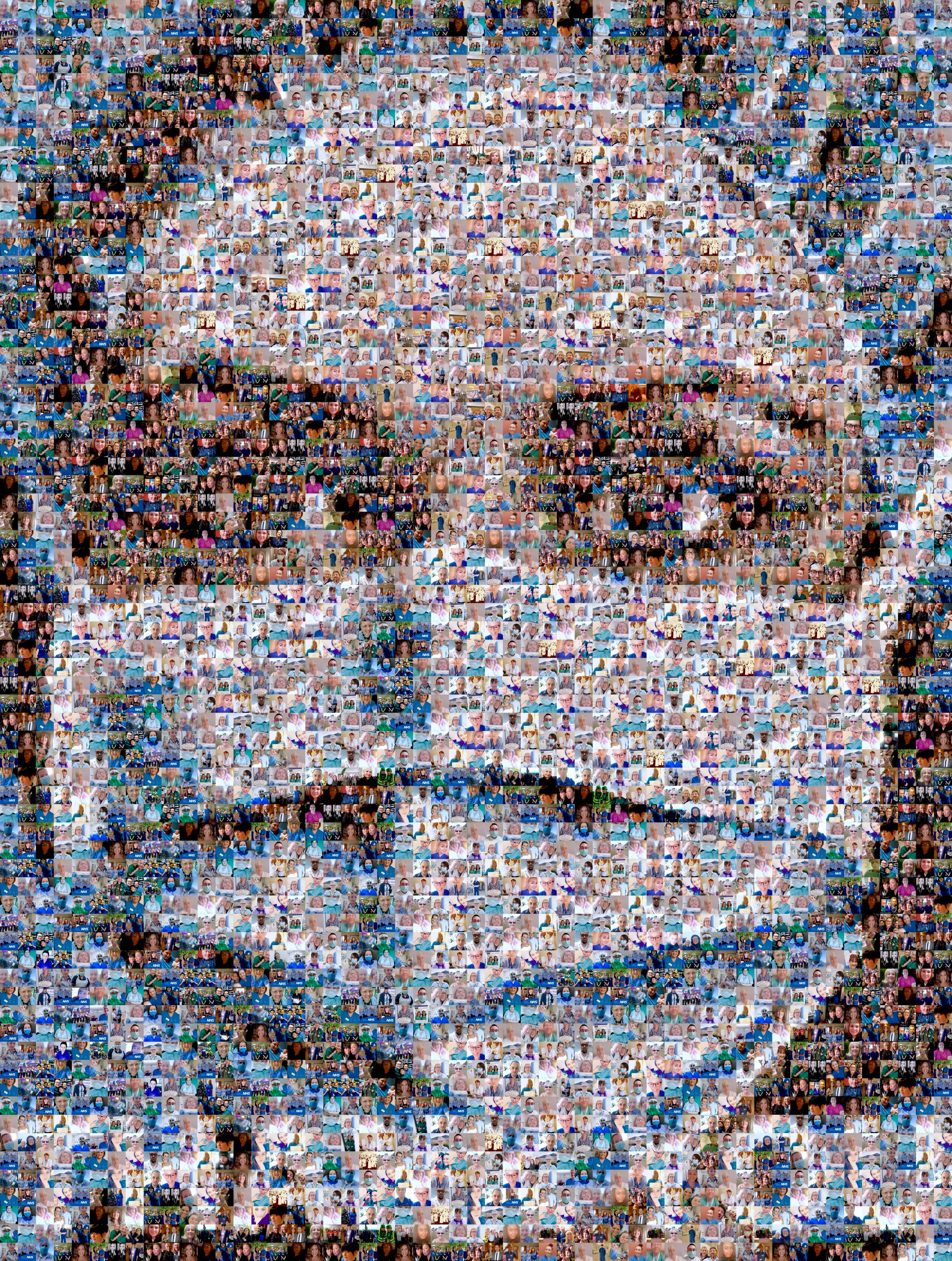
Wyburn's NHS "Thank You" collage created during the COVID-19 pandemic

In early 2019 Wyburn created artwork for Lisa Riley, for Boyzone and for Dame Joan Collins at her show at the London Palladium. Wyburn has since been commissioned for Mariah Carey's birthday present using silver glitter, and was then invited to meet her at the Royal Albert Hall. To mark Saint David's Day 2019, Wyburn created a large scale depiction of the Welsh patron saint, using garden bark and 1,000 daffodils, at the site of St Davids Bishops Palace. In May 2019 he presented a golden portrait of Dame Shirley Bassey to the singer, created on behalf of the charity Noah's Ark of which she is patron, on the day she was given Freedom of the City by Cardiff City Council. Wyburn then went on to present Catherine Zeta-Jones with artworks when she was awarded freedom of Swansea in July 2019.

2020 has seen Wyburn present artwork using lipstick to Caitlyn Jenner, using mealworms to Roman Kemp (after his stint in TV show I'm a Celebrity... and also to create Steps singer Ian "H" Watkins, alongside his Dancing on Ice same-sex partner Matt Evers, painted into an ice rink. The comedy panel show 8 Out of 10 Cats Does Countdown featured Wyburn's work when host Jimmy Carr pretended to assemble a portrait of himself painted with Marmite on toast.

Following Wyburn's portrait of Aneurin Bevan in 2018, Nathan created a digital collage of 200 NHS workers as a tribute to "key workers" during the COVID-19 pandemic, inspired by the Clap for our Carers movement. The pandemic-inspired artwork was featured on several newspaper front covers in Wales, including the Western Mail and the South Wales Echo. Wyburn also featured on shows such as This Morning and American talk show Live With Kelly and Ryan to talk about the piece, and how to stay creative during the COVID-19 lockdown. Channel 4 featured Wyburn on their new quarantine-inspired Grayson's Art Club TV show, presented by artist Grayson Perry, where he created a portrait using noodles and soy sauce.

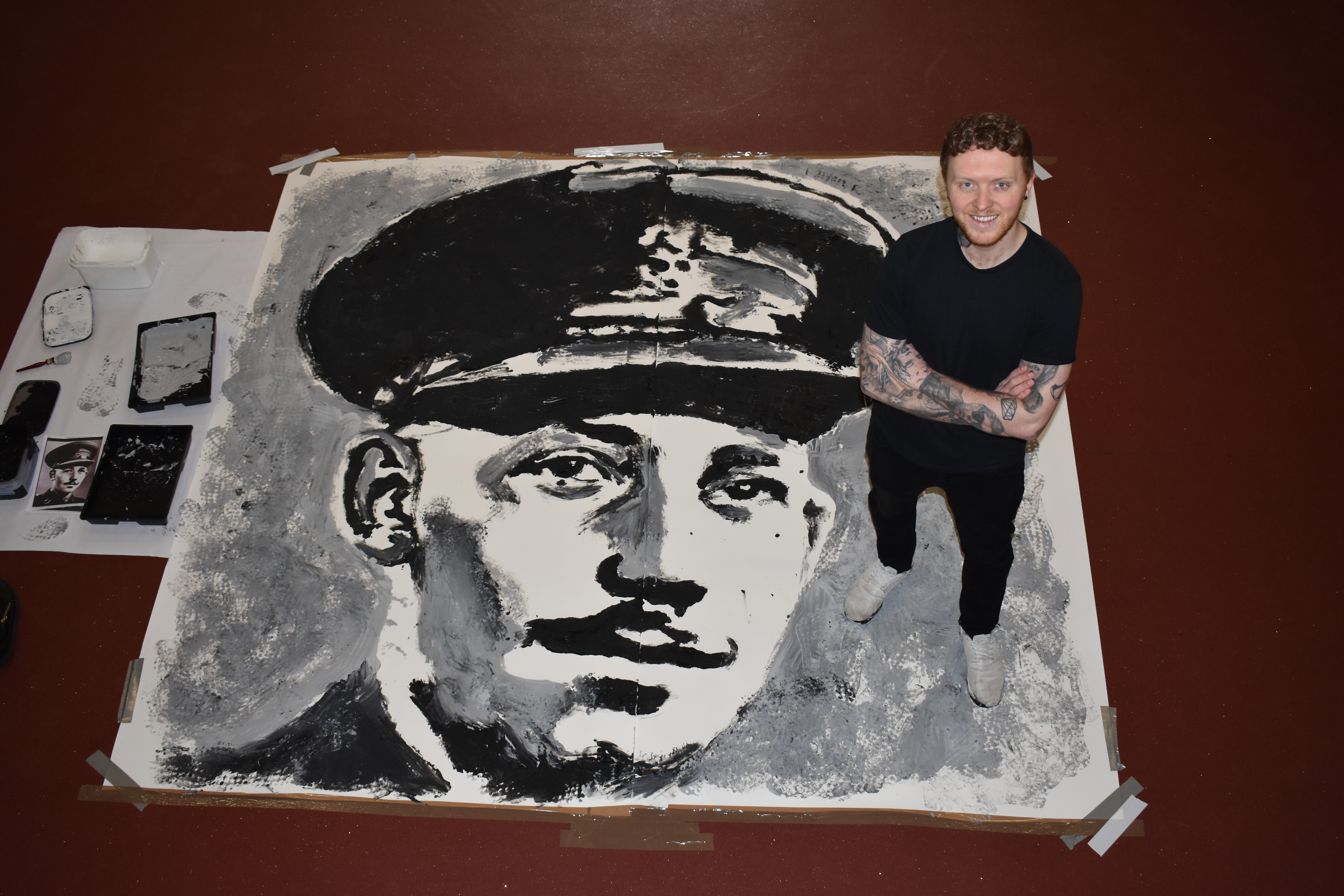
Wyburn with his April 2020 "foot painting" of Captain Tom Moore

In 2020 Wyburn partnered with Nutella & Smeg Australia for a campaign titled "Stay toasty with Nutella". The project attracted media attention in Australia and he made an appearance on network breakfast television, The TODAY show to unveil a toast portrait of Karl Stefanovic. In June 2020, Wyburn created a 18-metre soil portrait of Tom Jones for his 80th birthday in the grounds of Cardiff Castle. In August Wyburn unveiled a portrait of Gareth Thomas at Cardiff Royal Infirmary Sexual Health department, with Thomas present. The artwork was created using red fingerprints, to symbolise blood and identity, with aims of erasing the stigma around HIV.

== Advocacy and personal life ==
Wyburn is gay and is an ambassador and spokesperson for several anti-bullying charities and campaigns. He is also a supporting partner of Pride Cymru acting as their youth ambassador. When asked, in a 2014 interview with eqview.com, whether he saw his LGBT perspective as playing an important/any role in his art, he replied: "I see it playing a huge role in my life in general. I don’t think I’d be half as strong minded or determined if I hadn't had to go through my teenage years facing what difficulties I did – bullying etc. I feel proud enough to create pieces of work that are supportive of the LGBT community such as Obama painted on the pride flag – and stand on stage at Pride events and show people it gets better."

In October 2015 Wyburn took part in YouTube's first live 12-hour Stand Up to Cancer event, making coffee portraits of YouTube favourites Joe Sugg and Caspar Lee. The day raised over £120,000. Following the first series success, in May 2016 Wyburn modelled for photographer Thomas Knights, as part of his Red Hot 2 campaign. The exhibition and book is aimed at celebrating and rebranding the stereotype of red heads.

In August 2016 Wyburn was placed at number 10 in "The Pinc List 2016", a list of the 40 most influential LGBT people in Wales. In December 2018 Wyburn was part of a team of people who presented a Christmas-themed fund raising drag show at St Andrews United Reformed Church, Roath.

In August 2019, Wyburn was named as one of the top 5 Welsh LGBTQ people by Style of the City magazine, alongside the likes of Gareth Thomas and Russell T Davies. In September 2019, BBC Crimewatch aired an interview with Nathan, and several other LGBTQ+ participants about homophobia and hate crime in Wales.

To mark World Mental Health Day, on 10 October 2019, Wyburn shared a candid post about his mental health problems and how important it is to talk about them. He also became one of the first patrons for the Cardiff & Vale Health charity, as well as patron for Welsh Hearts, Autism Puzzles Cymru and Kinetic School of Performing Arts. In 2020, Wyburn was placed 79th on the 'Most Influential Redhead Men' list by Red Hot 100.

== Books ==
- Not That Kind of Art. Cardiff: Candy Jar Publishers. November 2015. ISBN 978-0-99-332210-5.
- POP tART. Cardiff: Self published. August 2020.
- 2020:Diary of Artist Nathan Wyburn. Cardiff: Cardiff & Vale Health Charity. March 2021.
