= Sarah Hope =

British twin artists (born 1975)

- Born: 1975 (age 50–51); Cardiff, Wales
- Education: Ysgol Gyfun Gymraeg Glantaf
- Alma mater: Royal Drawing School

Sarah Hope (born 1975) is a Welsh artist. Hope was awarded joint second prize winner of the Llanfairpwll Big Draw and was shortlisted for the Jerwood Drawing Prize.

With her twin sister, Nichola Hope, she produces visual artwork documenting the Welsh National Opera and occasionally paints and draws live. Collectively they have worked on international projects with Monte Carlo Opera, Melbourne Opera, Tasmanian Storytelling Festival and Los Angeles St. David's Day Festival.

Both sisters use pen, ink, and charcoal in their work, while Sarah specializes in drawing and working from pottery casts, and has furthered this study at the Atelier Lack in Minnesota.

== Early life ==
Sarah and her twin sister Nichola were born in Cardiff, Wales. She is of Welsh and Irish descent, and attended The Prince's Drawing School, London.
