= Frank Vining =

Frank Wilfred Vining (29 February 1924 – 27 October 1989) was an influential teacher of pottery who founded and, for over thirty years, led the ceramics course at Cardiff College of Art.

Vining was born in the south Wales mining village of Aberfan, in a house later swept away in the great tip disaster of 1966. He originally studied pictorial design and illustration at Cardiff School of Art under Ceri Richards, who was Head of Painting there from 1940 to 1944, but later turned to pottery. He joined the staff of Cardiff College of Art in 1950 and taught there until his retirement in 1982 during which time the ceramics course had become well known and highly regarded in the UK and abroad, with both undergraduate and postgraduate awards being established. He lived in Cardiff from 1954 where he set up a small studio pottery in the late 1950s, producing modernist stoneware vessels and forms which he exhibited widely in the period 1961-1968. His pottery is represented in the collections of the National Museum Cardiff, Aberystwyth University and Camberwell/ILEA Collection of Design and Craft, and is illustrated in Hamer.
