= Cardiff School of Art & Design =

Art School of Cardiff Metropolitan University

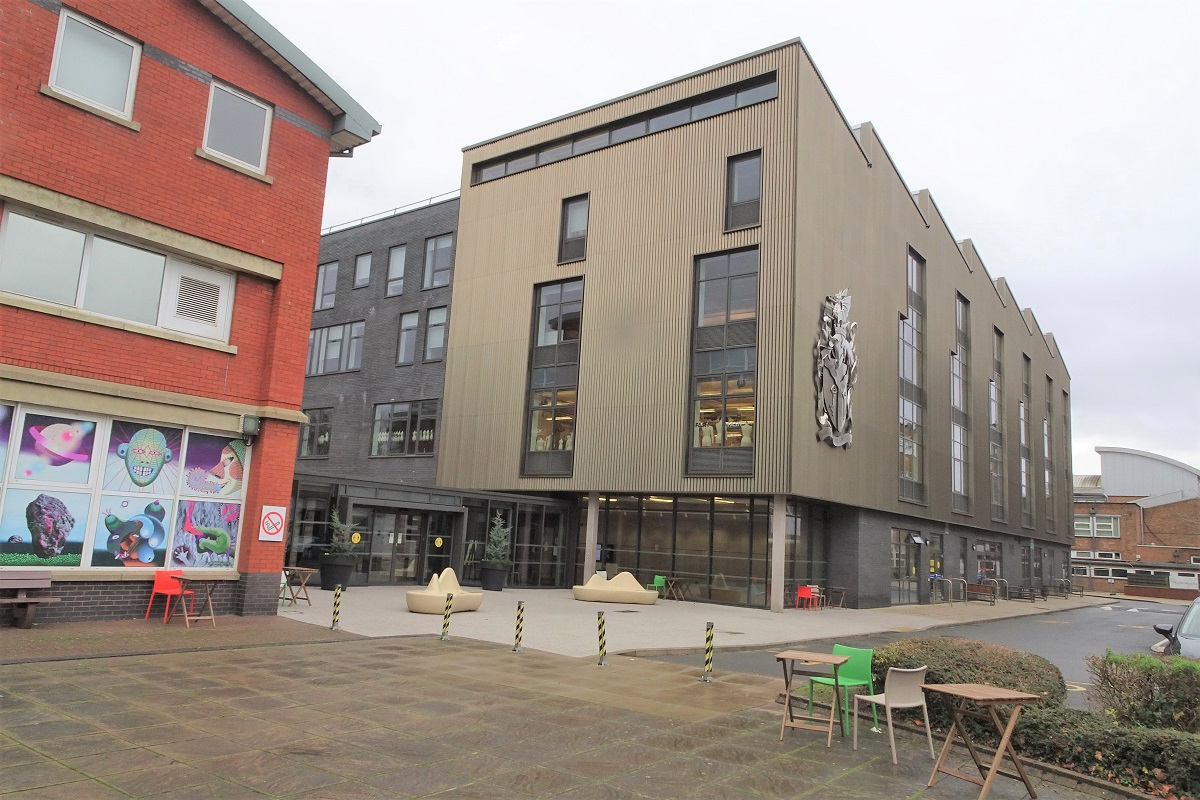
- CSAD main building in Llandaff
- Former names: Cardiff School of Art
- Type: Public
- Established: 1865; 161 years ago
- Affiliations: Cardiff Metropolitan University
- Students: 1,000
- Location: Cardiff, Wales
- Campus: Urban
- Dean: Dr Bethan Gordon
- Website: www.cardiffmet.ac.uk/school-of-art-and-design/

Cardiff School of Art & Design (CSAD) is one of the five academic schools that comprise Cardiff Metropolitan University. It originated as the Cardiff School of Art in 1865.

== History ==
Cardiff School of Art & Design opened in 1865 as the Cardiff School of Science & Art with lessons initially taking place on the top floor of the Cardiff Free Library and Museum. In 1867 a distinct School of Art was formed, based on the Art Night School, with 65 young pupils aged between 9 and 17. In 1868 an older intake was accepted, of 50 'artisan' students between 17 and 25 years old.

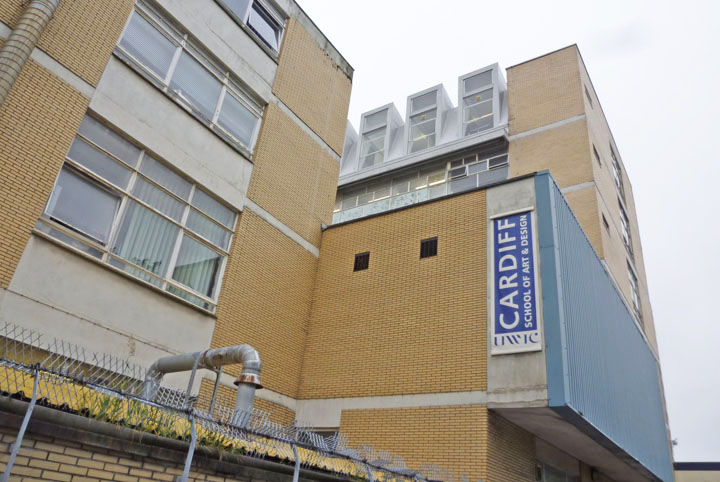
CSAD Howard Gardens

In 1966, a new six-storey campus was built in Howard Gardens, Cardiff, with large studios facing north. The building was designed by the Cardiff City Architect, John Dryburgh.

The School merged with other colleges in 1976 to become part of South Glamorgan Institute of Higher Education (later Cardiff Institute of Higher Education and the University of Wales Institute Cardiff). It is the oldest constituent part of Cardiff Metropolitan University.

In 2013, Cardiff Metropolitan University put its 2.25 acre Howard Gardens campus up for sale with the intention of moving to a new site in summer 2014. The School now occupies a brand new purpose-built building at the university's Llandaff Campus. This new building is home to extensive studios and workshops, and includes the MIT FabLab, and the Perceptual Experience Laboratory. The facilities also include dedicated photography studios, digital and traditional printmaking equipment, as well as a foundry.

== About CSAD ==
Cardiff School of Art & Design was assessed as one of the top 40 destinations to study art and design in the UK by guardian.co.uk in 2010. As of 2025, Cardiff School of Art & Design offers 15 undergraduate programmes:

- BA Animation
- BSc Architectural Design & Technology
- BA Architecture
- BA Artist Designer Maker
- BA Ceramics
- BA Fashion Design
- BA Fine Art
- BA Game Art
- BA Graphic Design & Communication
- BA Illustration
- BA Interior Architecture
- BA Interior Design
- BA Photography
- BA or BSc Product Design
- BA Textile Design

The interdisciplinary curriculum includes subject-specific practice and core skills teaching, as well as a histories, theories and contexts area of study called Constellation.

CSAD has 11 postgraduate programmes: MA Ceramics & Maker, MA Creative Enterprise & Innovation, MA Fashion Design, MFA Fine Art, MDes Global Design, MA Illustration & Animation, MA Interior Design, MRes Art & Design, MA Photography, MSc Product Design, and MA Visual Communication Design.

CSAD also offers doctoral research degrees leading to Research Doctorate (PhD) and also Professional Doctorate (DProf) (DEng) (DSBE).

CSAD has a number of partner colleges who deliver HNCs, Foundation Degrees and a further BA on its behalf, as well as close links with Ffotogallery, and Cardiff University Medical School. It has research affiliations and study exchange agreements with numerous other UK, EU and International Universities.

CSAD is affiliated with the Association of Commonwealth Universities, European University Association, and University Alliance.

== Research ==
The school's Art and Design research is conducted through the Wales Institute for Research in Art and Design (WIRAD). In the 2008 Research Assessment Exercise the Art & Design panel rated 95% of the research submission as international standard, with 70% rated as either Internationally Excellent or World Leading.

It is home to a number of highly regarded international standard research groups which range across the humanities, art, design and sciences as well as the Centre for Ceramic studies.

== Cardiff Open Art School ==
The Cardiff Open Art School (COAS) is part of the School, offering evening and weekend short courses open to all abilities, giving people the opportunity to hone their skills at the university’s professionally equipped studios and workspaces. Classes range from photography, ceramics, life drawing, printmaking and several other disciplines for part-time students in the Cardiff area in particular through the School's relationship with Ffotogallery, Cardiff MADE, and tactileBOSCH, Cardiff.

== Awards ==
In June 2010, the CSAD Summer Degree Show was voted the best in the UK for painting by Artists and Illustrators magazine.

In 2009, CSAD won both a HEIST bronze award and a best publication award at the Association of Commonwealth Universities Annual Marketing and Communications awards.

== Global Partnerships ==
Quality Assurance International (QAI) together with Planet EDU offer a number of awards closely based on the Cardiff School of Art & design curriculum. These awards run up to diploma level in a number of centres across India. The School has exchange partners right across the world as diverse and far afield as Australia, California, Mexico, Reunion, India, South Korea, Egypt and Lebanon as well as Erasmus partners around Europe all of whom offer Cardiff School of Art & Design students opportunities for travel and exchange.

== Notable staff ==
- Evan Charlton, head of the Art School from 1938 to 1945
- Shirazeh Houshiary, junior fellow 1979-80. Turner Prize nominee in 1994
- Anthony Howell, Senior Lecturer in Time Based Studies from 1986 to 1995
- Glyn Jones, head of the School of Fine Art from 1972 to 2001. Credited with rescuing the 56 Group Wales
- Ceri Richards (1903–1971), head of painting during World War II
- Frank Roper (1914–2000), sculpture lecturer, later vice principal, from 1947 to 1973
- Terry Setch, senior lecturer in painting 1964 - 2001, later RWA and RA member
- Andre Stitt, Fine Art Professor
- Norman Toynton, tutor during the 1960s. Abstract painter and Pop artist
- Frank Vining (1924–1989), ceramics tutor from 1950 to 1982
- Tom Hudson (1922-1997), Director of Studies 1964 -1978 Leading art educationalist and exponent of Basic Design
- Joan Baker (1922–2017), taught on foundation and intermediate courses in art and design from 1945 to 1983, being the first woman to run a major art department in Wales

== Notable alumni ==
Category:Alumni of Cardiff School of Art and Design

- Sadie Allen, painter and textile artist
- Iwan Bala, Gold Medal winner at the National Eisteddfod of Wales in 1997
- Simon Callery, painter
- Ed Elliott, sculptor
- David Emanuel, fashion designer and honorary fellow of Cardiff Metropolitan University
- Lizzie Farey, wood artist
- Esther Grainger (1912–1990), painter and art teacher
- Harry Greene, teacher, actor, TV personality
- Leslie Gilbert Illingworth, Chief Cartoonist at Punch magazine
- Phil Nicol, winner of the Gold Medal for Fine Art at the 2001 National Eisteddfod
- Joan Oxland (1920–2009), painter and art teacher
- Lilian Rathmell, painter and fabric artist
- Brian Savegar (1932–2007), Oscar winner for Best Art Direction for the 1986 film A Room with a View.
- Edwin Seward (1853-1924), prominent architect in Cardiff
- Robert Thomas (1926–1999), Welsh sculptor
- Sue Williams, painter, awarded the Eisteddfod Gold Medal for Fine Art in 2000
- Nathan Wyburn (born 1989), became known for his portraits made from food, appearing on Britain's Got Talent in 2011
- Ernest Zobole (1927–1999), painter and art teacher

== See also ==
- Art in Cardiff
