= Michael Gustavius Payne =

Welsh painter (born 1969)

Gustavius Payne
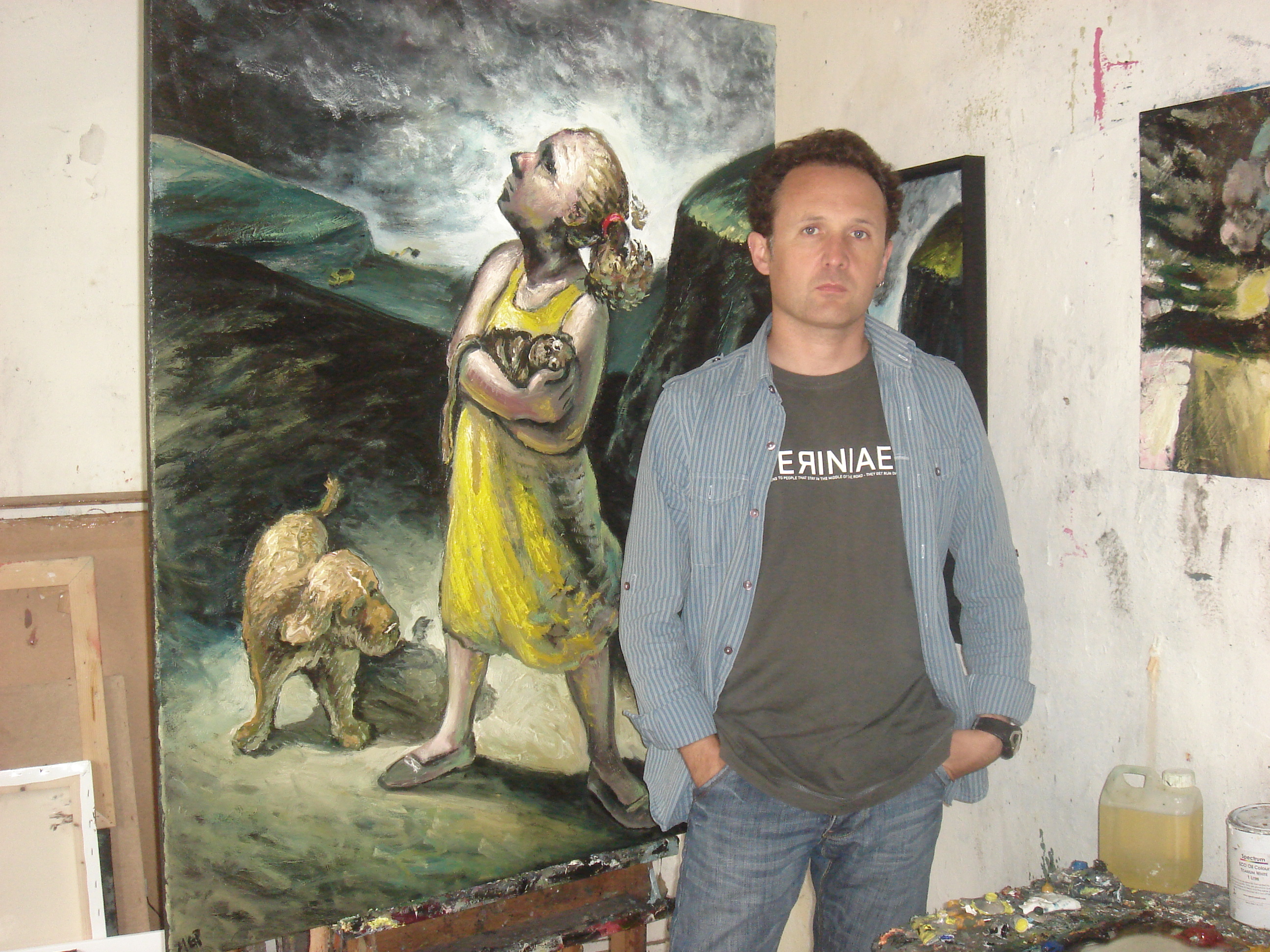
- Gustavius Payne in his studio, 2011
- Born: Michael Gustavius Payne; 1969 (age 56–57); Merthyr Tydfil
- Education: Cheltenham School of Art Athens School of Fine Arts Mid Glamorgan Centre of Art and Design Technology.
- Known for: Painting
- Awards: Purchase Award, Museum of Modern Art Wales. Project Grant, Arts Council of Wales. Purchase Prize, Visitors Choice, University of Glamorgan. Prize Winner, Young Wales III, Royal Cambrian Academy. Purchase Prize, Cheltenham & Gloucester Building Society. Student of the Year, National Eisteddfod of Wales.
- Elected: The Welsh Group
- Website: guspayne.com

Michael Gustavius Payne (born 1969) is a Welsh figurative painter. He paints primarily in oils and is influenced by mythological themes within a contemporary context. During his early exhibiting career he was known as Michael Payne, before he began using his full name. Since late 2012 he has dropped his first name and now uses the shorter Gustavius Payne.

== Early life and education ==
Payne was born in Merthyr Tydfil and raised on the town's Gurnos estate during the mid-1970s until the early 1990s. During 1991–1993, he attended the Mid Glamorgan Centre of Art & Design Technology, Pontypridd, where he won the Student of The Year Award at the National Eisteddfod of Wales, prompting the BBC arts programme The Slate to include an article about the artist on their Eisteddfod Special in 1993, shown initially on BBC1 Wales and also, shortly after throughout the UK, on BBC2. During 1993–1996, he studied at Cheltenham School of Art, where he gained a First Class BA Honors degree in fine art painting. During his time at Cheltenham, Payne was granted a place on the ERASMUS programme at the Athens School of Fine Arts. Upon completion of his degree at Cheltenham he won the Cheltenham & Gloucester Building Society's Art Purchase Prize, before returning to Wales to live initially in Cardiff, then later in Dowlais.

== Career ==
Recent work has drawn reference to Welsh culture, globalisation and exploitation. His 2011 joint exhibition with poet Mike Jenkins used a common political theme, with the traditional coal miners' canary as a symbol of exploitation of the 'little guy', as well as the exploitation of nature. Similar ecological and socialist themes can also be seen in more recent exhibitions together with his painting "Our Very Own Eco-System" held in the University of South Wales collection, and his cover illustration for Red Poets #19 magazine.

His work is also held in other collections including the Museum of Modern Art Wales' Tabernacle Collection and the Cheltenham & Gloucester building society.

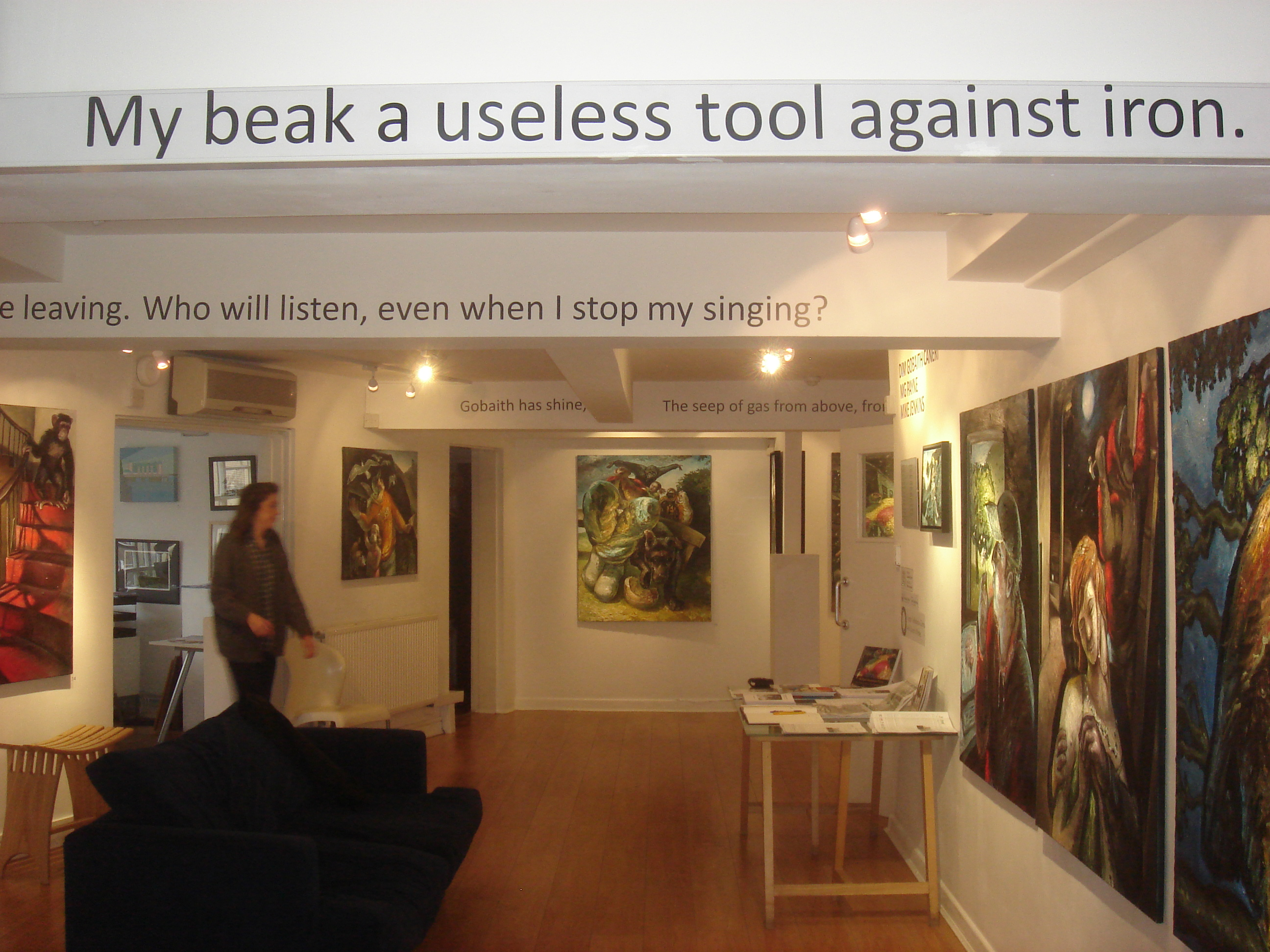
Dim Gobaith Caneri exhibition at the Washington Gallery, with text by poet Mike Jenkins.

He was elected into The Welsh Group in 2013.

In 2014 he provided the cover art for Welsh alternative rock band "The Joy Formidable" single "Tynnu Sylw " (aka) "Aruthrol B".

In 2018 he provided the cover art for the singles "Can A Song Save Your Life", "Sugar", "Rabbit Hole" and "(W.A.L.L.S.) Within A Little Love Song", following in 2020 by providing the entire album art (a total of 21 paintings) for the album Working To Design by Welsh singer-songwriter Anthony Price (under musical pseudonym name "dunkie").

In 2021 Payne also provided further cover art for the "dunkie" project for their 5-track EP entitled "The Vanishing and Other Stories".

=== Notable exhibitions ===
- 2013, The Cause and Effect Hypothesis, Art Central, Barry, Wales.
- 2012, New Work, Ffin-y-Parc, Llanrwst, Wales.
- 2011 – 2012, Dim Gobaith Caneri, Cyfarthfa Castle (Merthyr Tydfil), Museum of Modern Art Wales, Washington Gallery (Penarth) and West Wales Arts Centre. (An Arts Council of Wales project across Wales, in collaboration with poet Mike Jenkins).
- 2010, Master Strokes, (with Clive Hicks-Jenkins, Kevin Sinott and 4 other artists), Museum of Modern Art Wales, Wales.
- 2008, Welsh Myth, Washington Gallery, Wales.
- 2004, Nature or Nurture, West Wales Arts Centre, Fishguard, Wales.
- 2001, Dreams, Fairy Tales, Myths & Nightmares, Washington Gallery, Penarth, Wales.

== Publications ==
Gustavius Payne: Artwork 2007–2012 (self-published book)

Payne has also co-edited and written forewords for three Merthyr Tydfil anthologies, All Roads Lead To Merthyr, Never Mind The White Socks Here's Merthyr Tydfil and Merthyr Writing.
