= Clive Hicks-Jenkins =

Welsh artist (born 1951)

- The Virgin of the Goldfinches (2009), Contemporary Art Society for Wales, Llandaff Cathedral
- Born: 1951 (age 74–75); Newport, Wales
- Education: Italia Conti School
- Known for: Painting, drawing, printmaking, ceramics, maquettes, animation, artist's books
- Relatives: Katy Manning (cousin)
- Awards: Gulbenkian Welsh Art Prize
- Elected: The Welsh Group, 56 Group Wales, Royal Cambrian Academy
- Website: hicks-jenkins.com

Clive Hicks-Jenkins (born 1951) is a Welsh artist known especially for narrative paintings and artist's books. His paintings are represented in all the main public collections in Wales, as well as others in the United Kingdom, and his artist's books are found in libraries internationally.

== Early life and education ==
Clive Hicks-Jenkins was born in Newport, south Wales, in 1951. His father worked for the Central Electricity Generating Board and his mother was a hairdresser.

He attended Hartridge Comprehensive School in Newport but was unhappy there and at the age of twelve he moved to the Italia Conti School in London, where he studied theatre, worked as an actor in films and television and took classes at the Rambert Ballet School.

As a teen Hicks-Jenkins acted in a few television shows, including multiple appearances in Tom Grattan's War. In the late 1960s he was a performer and puppeteer with Cardiff's Caricature Theatre.

== Career ==
During the 1970s and 1980s Hicks-Jenkins worked as a choreographer, director, and stage designer, creating productions with, among others, the Vienna Festival, the Almeida Theatre, Theatr Clwyd and Cardiff New Theatre, where he was associate director.

Since the 1990s he has concentrated on his work as a visual artist.

Hicks-Jenkins works through the mediums of painting, drawing, printmaking, ceramics, maquettes, animation and artist's books. Nicholas Usherwood in Galleries has described his work as ‘reflective, expressive painting of the highest order’. Robert Macdonald wrote in Planet in 2002, "Hicks-Jenkins has emerged in recent years as one of the most powerful figurative painters in Wales". Since 2010 the artist has discussed his methods in a regular "Artlog" about his ongoing work.

Sense of place plays an important role in his paintings, especially places in Wales, and he has been identified as influenced by British mid-twentieth neo-romanticism. Places appear not only in landscape paintings but as emotionally charged backdrops to still lifes and narrative works and as Andrew Green states, "he negotiates his way through his landscapes, inner and outer; working with the lie of the land to make new discoveries, build new connections".

He has become known for thematic series of works that explore the meanings of stories from various sources. The earliest of these was his series drawing on the experiences of his father as a small boy terrified by the Welsh folk tradition of the Mari Lwyd. Another sequence of works titled the Temptations of Solitude examined present-day traumas and injustices through the lives of the Desert Fathers of Egypt. Other series have been based on stories of saints and animals, such as St Kevin and the blackbird, Elijah and the raven, Hervé and the wolf and St Francis preaching to the birds. Paintings based on stories from the Bible include an annunciation, now in Llandaff Cathedral, Cardiff, and a painting of the woman taken in adultery, in the Methodist Collection of Modern Christian Art, Oxford Brookes University.

Among reviewers who have noted links between his earlier theatrical work and his artistic imagination, Alison Lloyd wrote in Art Review, "His work is imbued with poise and balance, and the illusory strangeness of the stage".

In 2018 he completed a major project to produce a series of 14 screenprints with the Penfold Press tracing the story of Sir Gawain and the Green Knight, based on the 2008 translation of the medieval poem by Simon Armitage. The images were set alongside Armitage's text in the revised illustrated edition published in 2018.

== Exhibitions and recognition ==
Hicks-Jenkins has had solo exhibitions at the Martin Tinney Gallery in Cardiff, Anthony Hepworth Fine Art in Bath, the Kilvert Gallery, Cardiff New Theatre, Oriel Theatr Clwyd, Newport Museum and Art Gallery, Brecknock Museum and Art Gallery, MOMA Wales, Christ Church Picture Gallery in Oxford, the National Library of Wales and Jersey Arts Centre. His work has been included in over 80 group exhibitions.

A retrospective exhibition comprising some 200 works from across the artist's career loaned from public and private collections was held by the National Library of Wales in 2011 to coincide with his sixtieth birthday.

A substantial multi-author book devoted to his work was published by Lund Humphries in 2011, in which Simon Callow called him "one of the most individual and complete artists of our time". Hicks-Jenkins contributed a short autobiographical essay to this work.

He is an Honorary Fellow of Aberystwyth University School of Art and a member of the Royal Cambrian Academy of Art. He is a member of The Welsh Group and 56 Group Wales. He has lived in London, Newport, Cardiff, and near Aberystwyth.

== Artist's books and illustration ==
Hicks-Jenkins has had a working relationship since the mid 1990s with Nicolas and Frances McDowall of the Old Stile Press, a private press in Monmouthshire specialising in collaborations with artists. This resulted in five artist's books between 1998 and 2009. Two were editions of the Elizabethan poet Richard Barnfield, The Affectionate Shepheard and Sonnets. Two others were written by the contemporary poet Catriona Urquhart, Palmyra Jones and The Mare’s Tale. The most recent is the first illustrated edition of Sir Peter Shaffer’s play Equus.

His artist's books are in museums and libraries including the Library of Congress, New York Public Library, the British Library, the Bodleian Library, the National Library of Wales, the Paul Mellon Centre for British Art, National Museum Wales, the University of Pennsylvania, the Victoria & Albert Museum, the Folger Shakespeare Library, Winchester College and Auckland City Library.

In 2017 he collaborated with poet Jeffery Beam on an illustrated book focused on Jenkins' Mari Lywd paintings, published by Kin Press in 2019.

In 2019 he collaborated with poet Simon Armitage on an illustrated book retelling the story of Hansel and Gretel, published by Design for Today.

He has produced cover images and text decorations for commercially published books, such as Val/Orson, Thaliad, The Foliate Head, Glimmerglass, Maze of Blood and The Book of the Red King all by Marly Youmans, Star-Shot by Mary-Ann Constantine, Witch and Judas by Damian Walford Davies and Sir Gawain and the Green Knight by Simon Armitage. Poets have been drawn to respond to Hicks-Jenkins' work, as discussed in an essay by Professor Damian Walford Davies. An illustrated anthology was produced in 2011, The Book of Ystwyth: Six Poets on the Art of Clive Hicks-Jenkins.

== Collections ==
Hicks-Jenkins' work is held by many institutions, including:

- Amgueddfa Cymru National Museum Wales, Cardiff
- Brecknock Museum Art Trust, Brecon
- Contemporary Art Society for Wales
- University of Glamorgan
- Glynn Vivian Art Gallery, Swansea
- Grosvenor Museum, Chester, England
- Llandaff Cathedral, Cardiff
- Oxford Brookes University, Methodist Church Collection of Modern Christian Art
- MOMA, Wales, Machynlleth
- National Library of Wales, Aberystwyth
- Nevill Hall Hospital Trust, Abergavenny
- Newport Museum and Art Gallery
- Pallant House Gallery, Chichester, England
- Swansea Metropolitan University

== Select bibliography ==
- Barnie, John, Clive Hicks-Jenkins: The Mare’s Tale (2001: Newport Museum and Art Gallery)
- Bonta, Dave, Callum James, Andrea Selch, Catriona Urquhart, Damian Walford Davies and Marly Youmans, The Book of Ystwyth: Six Poets on the Art of Clive Hicks-Jenkins (2011: Carolina Wren Press) ISBN 978-0-932112-89-7
- Callow, Simon, Andrew Green, Rex Harley, Clive Hicks-Jenkins, Kathe Koja, Anita Mills, Montserrat Prat, Jacqueline Thalmann, Damian Walford Davies and Marly Youmans, Clive Hicks-Jenkins (2011: Lund Humphries) ISBN 978-1-84822-082-9
- Dunnett, Roderic, "Clive Hicks-Jenkins in Cardiff", British Art Journal, volume V, no 3, 2004, p. 86
- Harley, Rex, "Exhibitions: Clive Hicks-Jenkins", Modern Painters, Summer 2001, p. 104
- Harley, Rex, Seamus Heaney, Clive Hicks-Jenkins and Michael Tooby, The Temptations of Solitude: Paintings by Clive Hicks-Jenkins (2004: Grey Mare Press)
- Lloyd, Alison C., ‘Profile: Clive Hicks-Jenkins’, Art Review May 2001, p. 48
