= Machynlleth Comedy Festival =

Welsh comedy festival

Machynlleth Comedy Festival Gŵyl Gomedi Machynlleth
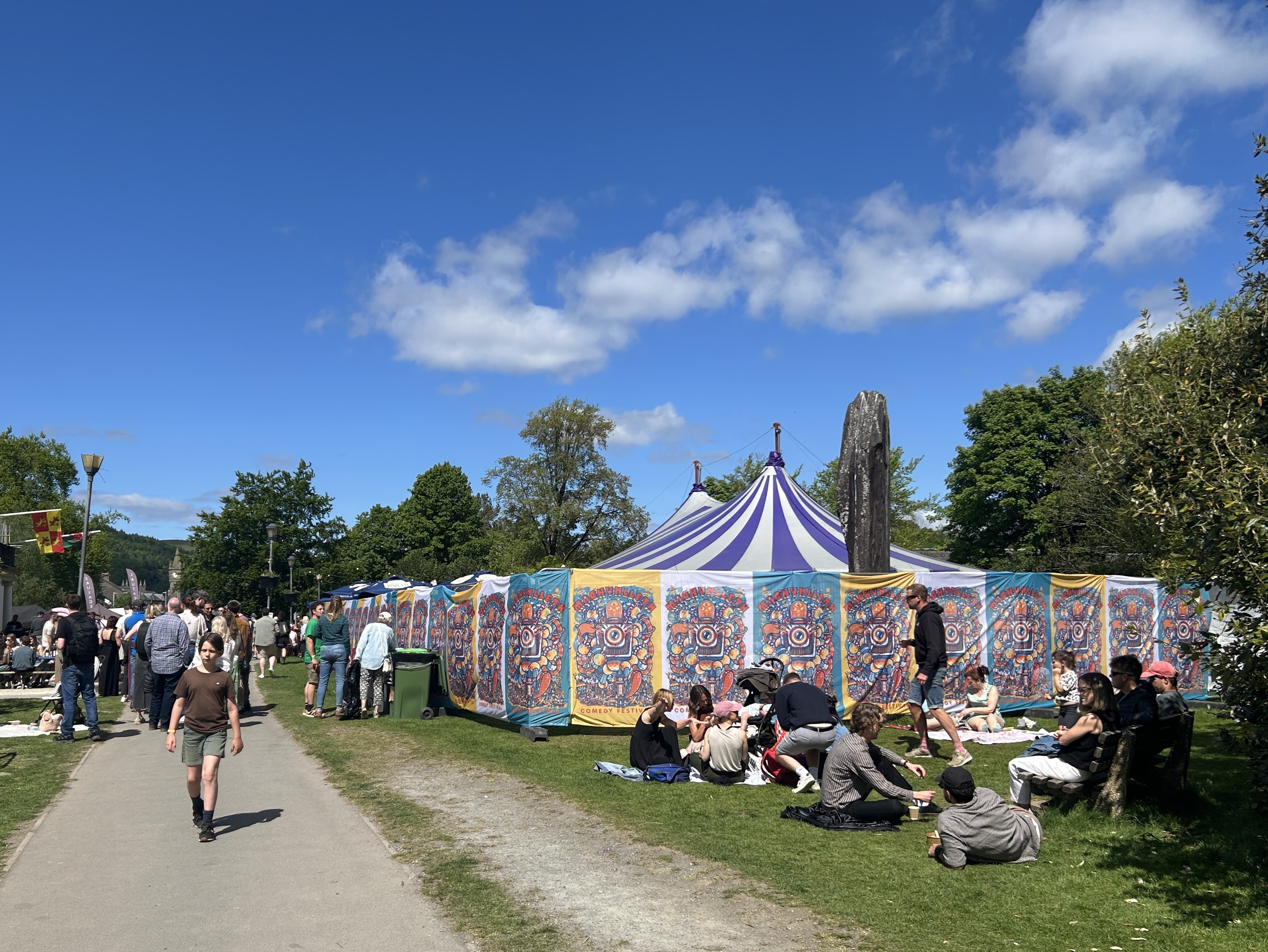
- The festival in 2025
- Nickname: Mach Fest
- Genre: Comedy festival
- Frequency: Annually
- Locations: Machynlleth, Wales, UK
- Inaugurated: 23–25 April 2010; 16 years ago
- Founder: Little Wander
- Most recent: 2–4 May 2025
- Next event: 1–3 May 2026
- Attendance: 8,000
- Website: machcomedyfest.co.uk

Machynlleth Comedy Festival (Welsh: Gŵyl Gomedi Machynlleth) is a three-day comedy festival held annually in Machynlleth, Wales. Although the town is home to only around 2,000 residents, in 2024 the festival drew in around four times that number of visitors. The festival, nicknamed "Mach Fest" by its supporters, is aimed as a testing ground for comedians to experiment with new material in the spring before the more intense Edinburgh Fringe Festival in August.

== History ==
=== Founding ===
The festival was launched in 2010 by comedy production group Little Wander, co-founded by former stand-up comedian Henry Widdicombe (brother of comedian Josh Widdicombe). The festival was created as a welcoming environment for comedians to test out new material without fear of critical audiences or harsh reviews. To achieve this, the festival took a different approach to many mainstream comedy festivals: no press allowed; no new act competitions; no exclusive industry parties; and no awards.

Little Wander looked to small town festivals like the Green Man Festival and Brecon Jazz Festival as models for the developing festival to follow. Mach Fest director Henry Widdicombe noticed the lack of smaller town-based festivals within the comedy scene: comedy festivals tended towards bigger cities, where the events might be overlooked. Additionally, Machynlleth is accessible by train, but still relatively remote, meaning that those who attend must to commit to the trip, resulting in audience composed primarily of comedy fans.

Little Wander was given a grant from the Powys County Council in 2010 which allowed them to hold the first edition of the Machynlleth Comedy Festival in Machynlleth that year.

=== Growth ===
The first incarnation of the festival was attended by an estimated 500 audience members, a figure which doubled over the following two years. Audience numbers grew to 6000 expected in 2017, and over 8000 attending in 2024. In 2024, there were over 200 shows during the long weekend, by roughly the same among of performers. Despite the festival's success, Little Wander have expressed their desire to maintain the festival's intimate atmosphere and affordable tickets, rather than cashing in on what could be a growing, expandable enterprise.

=== Pandemic lockdown and return ===
In 2020, Machynlleth was one of many UK comedy festivals affected by the COVID-19 pandemic. Organisers confirmed in March that all in-person shows would be cancelled, and that ticket reservations would be refunded. The following month, plans were announced for an "audio version" of the festival to be hosted on BBC Radio Wales and BBC Sounds, with special programming to be broadcast between 1-3 May, when the festival had been scheduled to take place. These programmes included a "documentary retrospective" marking the tenth anniversary of the festival, as well as a cabaret show, sketch comedy, and stand-up performances broadcast live from comedians' homes. Performers included Mark Watson, Lolly Adefope and Jordan Brookes; the weekend was hosted by Kiri Pritchard-McLean. This collaboration with BBC Radio Wales was repeated in 2021, when stand-up specials recorded in front of a live, virtual audience were broadcast to replace the in-person festival.

== Other details ==
Each year, showcase programmes have been broadcast from the festival by BBC Radio 4 Extra and BBC Radio Wales; the latter was an official partner of the festival from 2018 until 2023.

Camping in the town is available for visitors, including yurts. The festival also includes a theatre programme, events aimed at children and live music.

== Venues ==
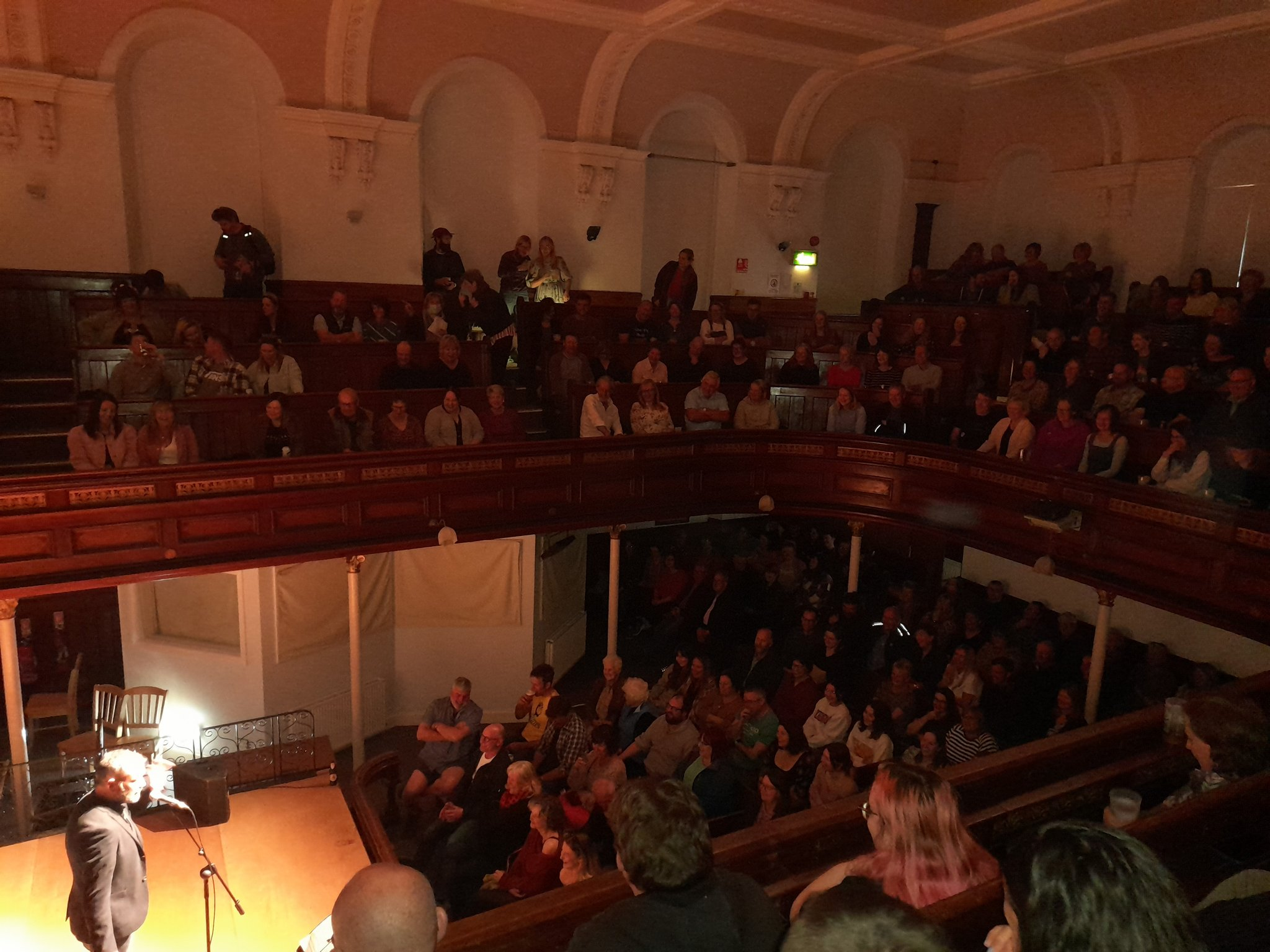
Tudur Owen performing in Y Tabernacl, a former Wesleyan chapel, at the 2022 festival

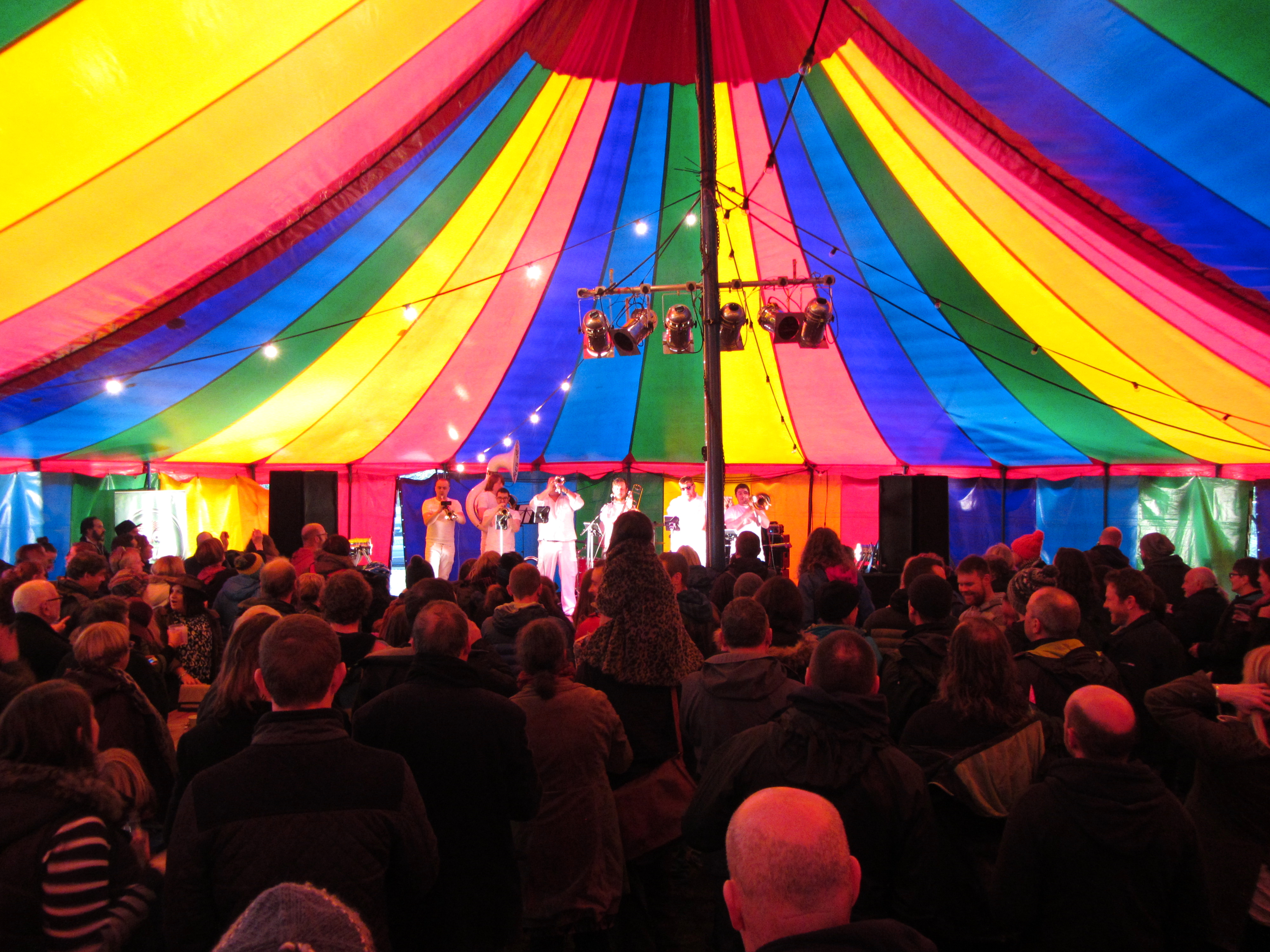
The festival's 'big top' tent, used as a venue for live music in 2016

The festival makes use of a wide range of spaces throughout the town, many of which are not ordinarily performance venues. These include Owain Glyndŵr's Parliament House, the traditional location of the 15th-century parliament of Owain Glyndŵr; Plas Machynlleth, a Georgian era stately home; Ysgol Bro Hyddgen, a local school; and Y Tabernacl, a former Wesleyan chapel that is now home to the Museum of Modern Art, Machynlleth.

The town's leisure centre hosts the Mach Arena.

On several occasions, a dedicated service on the Corris Railway, a local narrow-gauge heritage railway, has been arranged as part of the festival. This service, known as the "Machynlleth Comedy Festival Express", is operated by a traditional steam locomotive and passenger coaches; audience members board the train at Corris railway station and are taken to watch a mixed-bill stand-up comedy show held in an engine shed at Maespoeth Junction.

== Reception ==
In a 2010 review for BBC Wales Music, Bethan Elfyn praised the "great atmosphere" of the inaugural festival. Writing for The Guardian the following year, James Kettle highlighted the festival's "top-quality lineup", and noted that the market town of Machynlleth offered a "break from the norm" of "big metropolitan centres" hosting the majority of UK comedy.

The festival is well liked among comedians, visitors and local residents. Comedian Stewart Lee called it "a comedy festival for comedy fans, not for casual consumers or TV executives".
