= Hallstatt (disambiguation) =

Hallstatt is a town in Austria.

Hallstatt may also refer to:

- Hallstatt (China), a housing development in China based upon the town in Austria
- Hallstätter See, or Lake Hallstatt, on which Hallstatt is located
- Hallstatt culture, an archaeological culture of which Hallstatt is the type site
- Hallstatt Museum, in Hallstatt, Austria
- Hallstatt plateau, an anomaly in carbon dating
- Hallstatt cycle, a hypothesized solar variability cycle
- Hallstatt Lecture, a lecture series on Celtic culture

== See also ==
- Hallstadt, Bavaria, Germany
