= Studio with Gloves =

1993 painting by Shani Rhys James

- Artist: Shani Rhys James
- Year: 1993
- Medium: Oil on canvas
- Dimensions: 233 cm × 172 cm (92 in × 68 in)
- Location: National Library of Wales, Aberystwyth

Studio with Gloves is a 1993 oil on canvas painting by the Welsh artist Shani Rhys James in the National Library of Wales.

This painting shows a self-portrait sitting among an array of discarded white work gloves in her studio. The artist is noted for her melancholy self-portraits. This painting however seems to catch the artist off-guard rather than in a melancholy mood, as it exposes the creative process in all of its riotous colors. The year after painting this self-portrait, Rhys James was elected to the Royal Cambrian Academy of Art in 1994.
