= Shani Rhys James =

Welsh artist (born 1953)

Shani Rhys James MBE
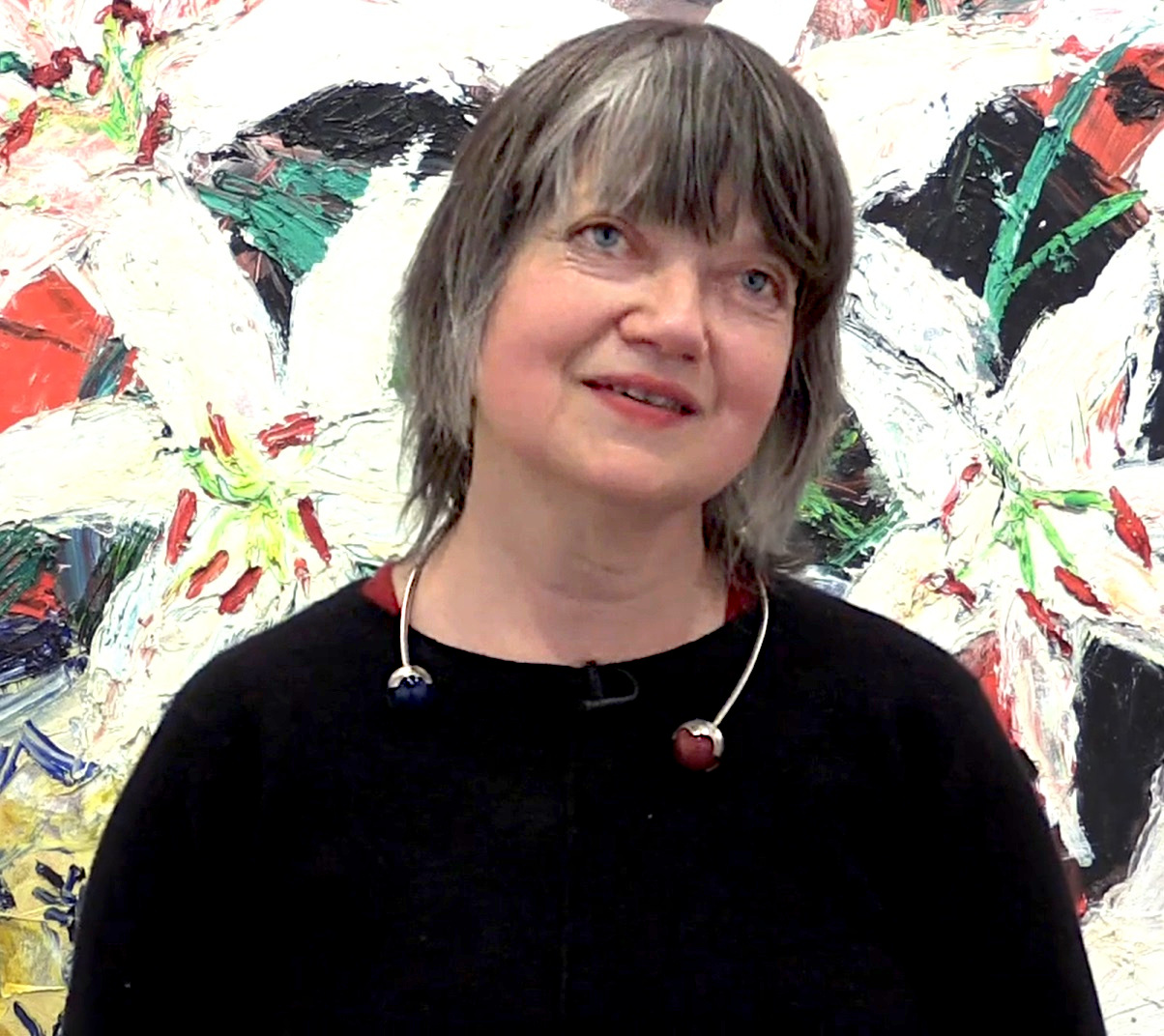
- Rhys James in 2015
- Born: 1953 (age 72–73); Melbourne, Australia
- Education: Saint Martin's School of Art, London
- Known for: Oil painting
- Spouse: Stephen West
- Awards: Jerwood Painting Prize; BBC Wales Visual Art Award; Royal National Eisteddfod Gold Medal for Fine Art; Glyndwr Award
- Elected: Royal Cambrian Academy of Art
- Website: shanirhysjames.com

Shani Rhys James MBE (born 1953) is a Welsh painter based in Llangadfan, Powys. She has been described as "arguably one of the most exciting and successful painters of her generation" and "one of Wales' most significant living artists". She was elected to the Royal Cambrian Academy of Art in 1994. In the 2006 New Years Honours she was appointed Member of the Order of the British Empire (MBE) for "services to art".

== Early life ==
Shani Rhys James was born in 1953 in Melbourne, Australia, the daughter of a Welsh father and an Australian mother and came to the UK as a child. At six years old Rhys James was ill with thrombocytopenia. She describes this time spent out of school as being significant for allowing her time to play and enter a state of child-like games and develop her imagination during these important early years. Growing up in Australia during her early years was by her own admission a particular contributing factor from her childhood to her decision to make art a career. Her mother told her not to go to art school as the best artists she knew didn't attend. She was however encouraged by staying with Charles Blackman as well as having artist friends during childhood. Theatre was also a large influence as Rhys James's mother was an actress. Constant production of scenery, props and theatre costumes as well as rehearsal of parts all formed part of the environment that surrounded her during childhood.

Early education took place in Eltham, Australia from 5 to 9 years of age then Parliament Hill Girls School, London.

== Education and career ==
Rhys James studied at Loughborough College of Art and Design and in 1976 obtained a degree in Fine Art at Saint Martin's School of Art, in London.

She later moved to Powys to live and work, taking her young family with her.

Rhys James is known particularly for her melancholy self-portraits. Her 1993 Studio with Gloves shows her sitting in her studio. When she is not painting herself she generally paints other women, still lifes, domestic scenes or "riotously spiky and rip-roaring" vases of flowers. Art critic Michael Glover says "There's something mad, wild and thuggish about this work, such is its total lack of restraint. It seems to be gulping at colour... She lathers and slathers on the paint with a kind of unrestrained glee. No wonder the eyes of the model are always slightly bulbous with a kind of childish wonderment". Prints, studies in charcoal and ink are also produced by Rhys James as well as painting.

Rhys James has been elected to the Royal Cambrian Academy of Art and the 56 Group Wales.

In 2011 the artist and entertainer, Rolf Harris, included Rhys James in a BBC TV series on 'great' Welsh artists. She was the only living artist included. Harris painted a self-portrait in the style of Rhys James, using a small hand mirror and looking at his face 'as a landscape'.

Rhys James has exhibited across Europe, also in the US, Hong Kong, New Zealand and Australia. She is represented by the Martin Tinney Gallery, Cardiff.

== Solo exhibitions ==
Listed by BBC Wales Arts webpage unless otherwise stated.

- 1992 – Beaux Arts, Bath
- 1993 – Blood Ties, Wrexham Library Arts Centre, touring exhibition
- 1994 – Glyn Vivian Art Gallery, Swansea; Midlands Art Centre, Birmingham; Newport Museum and Art Gallery; Carmarthen Art Gallery
- 1995 – Martin Tinney Gallery, Cardiff
- 1996 – Re-Vision, Fettered Past, Midlands Art Centre, Birmingham
- 1997 – Facing the Self, Mostyn Art Gallery, Llandudno, also touring
- 2000 – The inner Room, Stephen Lacey Gallery, London
- 2003 – Significant Paintings, Museum of Modern Art Wales, Machynlleth
- 2003 – Recent Paintings, Martin Tinney Gallery, Cardiff
- 2004 – The Black Cot, Aberystwyth Arts Centre touring exhibition
- 2005 – Layers, Martin Tinney Gallery, Cardiff
- 2008 – Martin Tinney Gallery, Cardiff
- 2009 – Two Ateliers, Connaught Brown Gallery, London
- 2010 – Martin Tinney Gallery, Cardiff
- 2010 – Hillsboro Fine Art, Dublin
- 2014 – Florilingua, installation in the foyer of the Wales Millennium Centre, Cardiff
- 2015 – Distillation, landmark exhibition of Shani Rhys James's work at the National Library of Wales, Aberystwyth

== Prizes and awards ==
Listed by Martin Tinney Gallery unless otherwise stated.

- 1989 First Prize, Wales Open, Aberystwyth Arts Centre
- 1990 Second Prize, Wales Open, Aberystwyth Arts Centre
- 1991 First Prize, Mostyn Open, Oriel Mostyn, Llandudno
- 1992 Gold Medal for Fine Art, National Eisteddfod of Wales
- 1993 Hunting Art Prize/Observer Art Prizes
- 1994 Elected member of 56 Group Wales
- 1994 Elected member of Royal Cambrian Academy
- 1994 Winner of the BBC Wales Visual Art Award 1994
- 1994 Second Prize, BP National Portrait Award
- 2003 Woman of Culture, Welsh Women of the Year Awards
- 2003 Winner of the Jerwood Painting Prize
- 2006 Creative Wales Award, Arts Council of Wales
- 2007 Honorary Fellowship, University of Wales Institute Cardiff
- 2007 Glyndwr Award for an Outstanding Contribution to Arts in Wales, presented by MOMA Wales
- 2008 Honorary Fellowship, Hereford College of Art
- 2017 Honorary Fellowship, Wrexham Glyndŵr University

== Personal life ==
Rhys James is married to artist Stephen West and has two children. Though she is widely viewed as Welsh she is an Australian passport holder and describes herself as a "mongrel Celt".

She has bought a second home in Charente, France (2010), where she spends a lot of time.

== See also ==
- What Do Artists Do All Day?
