= Trevor Fishlock =

British journalist, author and broadcaster (1941–2026)

- Born: 21 February 1941; Hereford, Herefordshire, England
- Died: 3 July 2026 (aged 85); Llandough, Penarth, Wales
- Occupations: Writer; broadcaster
- Known for: News correspondent; history, biography and travel writing
- Spouse: Penny Fishlock
- Children: 3

Trevor Fishlock (21 February 1941 – 3 July 2026) was a British journalist, author and broadcaster. He worked as a foreign correspondent for The Times and The Daily Telegraph, reporting from more than 70 countries, before moving into television and radio. He also published several books with major publishing houses, including several on Wales. Fishlock was born in Hereford, and later lived in Cardiff. On occasions he broadcast from the National Library of Wales and gave the Machynlleth Festival's Hallstatt Lecture in 1999.

== Foreign correspondent ==
Fishlock worked as a foreign correspondent for The Times in numerous countries for 17 years, reporting from more than 60 countries including Wales (1969–77), India (1980–83) and the USA (1983–86), later becoming Moscow correspondent for the Daily Telegraph, and writing a travel column. At The Press Awards he won Foreign Reporter of the Year in 1982 and International Reporter of the Year in 1986.

== Author ==
Fishlock wrote books about the people and places he encountered while working abroad and at home, covering politics, history, biography and society. He was inspired to write Senedd (2011) after seeing early sketches of the planned Welsh Assembly building and watching them evolve into the completed Senedd. His book India File (1987) was in The Daily Telegraph's Michael Kerr's list of his top ten travel books in 2011 and about which he said that while it was first published …"in 1983, and could hardly be said to be up to the minute, but its 200 pages still make for a great primer in what can initially be an overwhelming country.” A Gift of Sunlight tells the story of the Davies sisters who collected paintings and bequeathed them to the Welsh nation. Fishlock presented a BBC documentary about the sisters, broadcast in May 2014, and gave a talk about the book at Swansea’s National Waterfront Museum in 2015.

== Broadcaster ==
Fishlock is probably best known for his long-running HTV Wales television series Fishlock's Wild Tracks, which ran for over 14 years, accompanied by a series of tie-in books and videos. He presented over 150 TV and radio programs. In 2012 he presented an ITV documentary about the Pembrokeshire island of Skokholm and in 2013 revisited “his” Wales in Fishlock’s Wales: Forty Years On for ITV.

== Personal life and death ==
Fishlock was born in Hereford in 1941 but later moved to Cardiff. He had three children and seven grandchildren by his first marriage and was later married to Penny Fishlock. In 2021, he was diagnosed with dementia.

Fishlock died at University Hospital Llandough, near Penarth, on 3 July 2026, aged 85.

=== Publications ===
- Wales and the Welsh. Littlehampton Book Services (1972) ISBN 978-0304938582
- Americans and nothing else. Littlehampton Book Services (1980) ISBN 978-0304306381
- Talking of Wales. Academy Chicago Pub. (1982) ISBN 978-0586045558
- Gandhi’s Children. Universe Books (1983) ISBN 978-0876635933
- Indira Gandhi. David & Charles (1986) ISBN 978-0241117729
- The State of America. John Murray (1986) ISBN 978-0719542923
- India File. John Murray (1987) ISBN 978-0719543890
- Out of Red Darkness: Reports from the Collapsing Soviet Empire. John Murray (1993) ISBN 978-0719550041
- Say who you are. BBC Cymru (1993) ISBN 0951898833 (broadcast on Radio Wales)
- My Foreign Country: Trevor Fishlock on Britain. John Murray (1997) ISBN 978-0719552281
- Fishlock’s Wild Tracks. Seren Books (1998) ISBN 1854112252 (from the TV series)
- Invitation to a Mystery. Hallstatt Lecture, Machynlleth (1999) ISBN 0-9519971-3-0
- More Fishlock’s Wild Tracks Seren Books (2000) ISBN 1854112929
- Fishlock’s Sea Stories. Poetry Wales Press (2003) ISBN 9781854113603
- More Fishlock’s Sea Stories. Ceiniog (2005) ISBN 9780954982805
- In This Place - The National Library of Wales & in Welsh: Yn Y Lle Hwn: Llyfrgell Genedlaethol Cymru (trans Mereid Hopwood). National Library of Wales (2007) ISBN 978-1862250581
- Conquerors of Time. Faber & Faber (2008) ISBN 9780571247226
- Pembrokeshire: Journeys & Stories (illustrated by Jeremy Moore). Gomer Press (2011) ISBN 9781848510869
- Senedd. Graffed (2011) ISBN 978-1905582433
- A Gift of Sunlight. Gomer Press (2014) ISBN 9781848518117
