= Ivor Davies (artist) =

Welsh artist (born 1935)

Ivor Davies MBE
- Born: November 1935 (age 90–91); Treharris, Merthyr Tydfil County Borough, Wales
- Education: Cardiff College of Art; Swansea College of Art; University of Lausanne; University of Edinburgh
- Known for: Painting / Multi-media / Conceptual / Mosaic
- Awards: Fine Art Gold Medal winner, National Eisteddfod of Wales; MBE; Vice-President of the Royal Cambrian Academy of Art
- Elected: The Welsh Group; Royal Cambrian Academy

Ivor Davies, MBE (born November 1935) is a Welsh artist. He currently lives and works in Penarth, and largely works using the Welsh language.

As a boy Davies went to Penarth County School. He studied at Cardiff College of Art and Swansea College of Art between 1952 and 1957, and then from 1959 to 1961 studied at the University of Lausanne in Switzerland. He then began teaching at the University of Wales before moving on to the University of Edinburgh, where he also completed a PhD on the Russian avant-garde. Davies finally retired from teaching at the Gwent College of Higher Education in 1988.

He was elected vice-president of the Royal Cambrian Academy of Art in 1995 and is a member of The Welsh Group. He was made an MBE in the 2007 New Year Honours list. At the 2002 National Eisteddfod of Wales he won the Gold Medal for Fine Art.

== Artwork ==
Davies is passionate about the culture, language and politics of Wales, which inspire his artwork. For a number of years he has sponsored the Ivor Davies Award at Y Lle Celf (Art Space in Welsh), at the National Eisteddfod of Wales, for an artwork "that conveys the spirit of activism in the struggle for language, culture and politics in Wales".

Davies' early works in the 1960s used explosives as an expression of society's destructive nature. Davies took part in the Destruction in Art Symposium in London in 1966. More recent work has included painting, installations; he has also designed and installed a mosaic of Saint David at Westminster Cathedral.

A major retrospective exhibition of his work from the 1940s onwards, Ivor Davies: Silent Explosion, opened at National Museum Cardiff in 2015. This was the largest exhibition dedicated to the work of a single contemporary artist ever held in Wales.

Many of his works are reproduced in the volume Encounters with Ivor Davies, ed. Helen Phillips (Swansea: H’mm Foundation, 2026).
