= Bethel, Gwynedd =

Coordinates: 53.164°N 4.209°W

Bethel
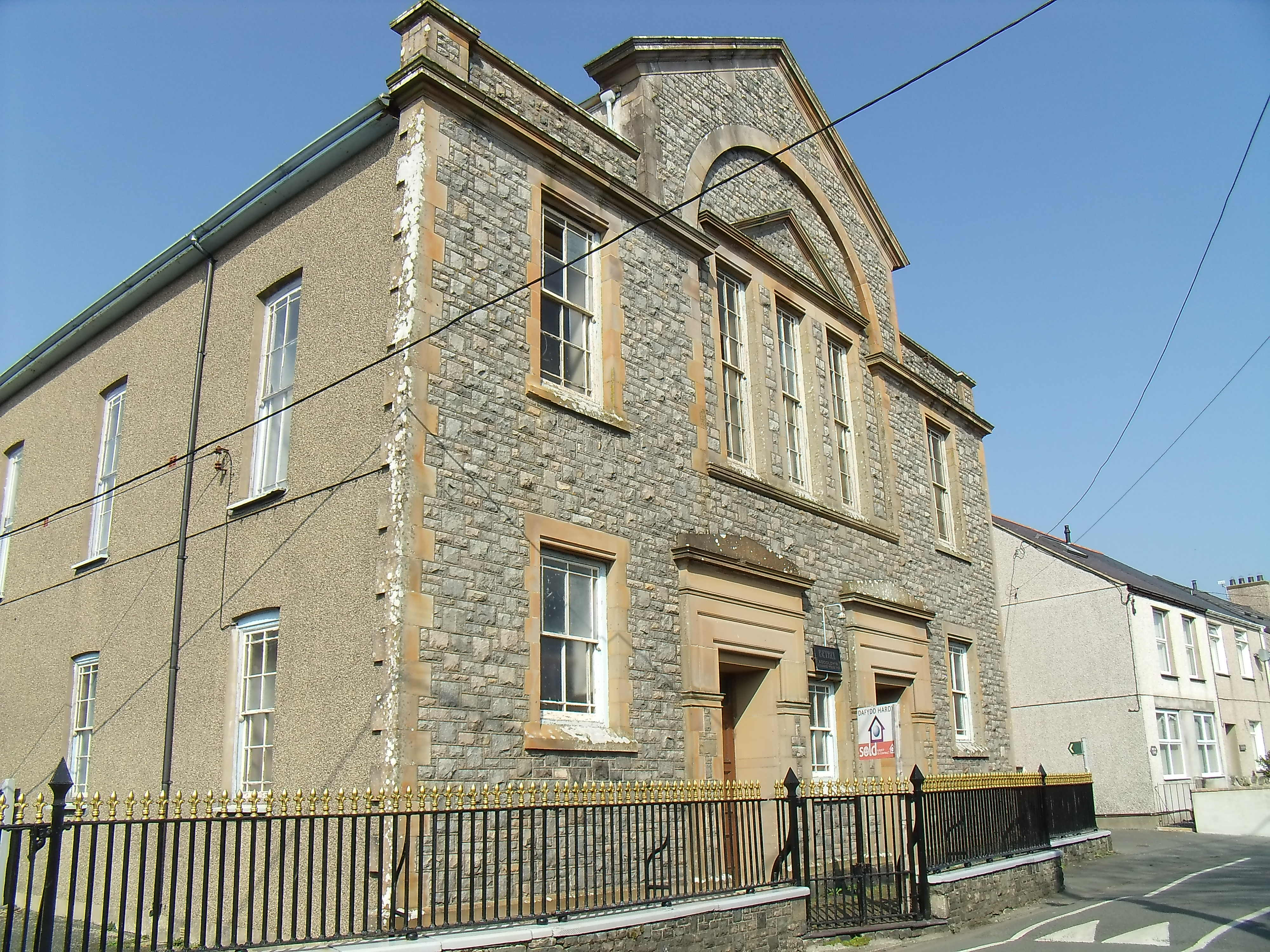
- Capel Bethel, Bethel

- Location within Gwynedd
- Population: 1,395 (2011)
- OS grid reference: SH522653
- Community: Llanddeiniolen
- Principal area: Gwynedd
- Country: Wales
- Sovereign state: United Kingdom
- Post town: CAERNARFON
- Postcode district: LL55
- Dialling code: 01248
- Police: North Wales
- Fire: North Wales
- Ambulance: Welsh
- UK Parliament: Dwyfor Meirionnydd
- Senedd Cymru – Welsh Parliament: Gwynedd Maldwyn

Bethel is a village in Gwynedd, Wales. It lies east of Caernarfon on the B4366 road. Bethel Primary School is located in the village. The population of Bethel electoral ward was measured in the 2011 Census, and found to be 1,395. The village population is 1,171 with 87.3% having some form of Welsh identity one of the highest figures in the north of Wales.

== Welsh Language ==
According to the 2011 UK Census, 85.8% of the electoral ward's population could speak Welsh. 40.2% of the population born outside Wales can speak Welsh - the highest figure in Gwynedd. 93.7% of the population who were born in Wales could speak Welsh.

== Ysgol Gynradd Bethel ==
Ysgol Gynradd Bethel is the main serving primary school for most children from Bethel, the community of Llanddeiniolen and the surrounding rural areas. The school educates children aged between 3–11 years old. In 2015, the school had 153 pupils on roll.

Welsh is the school's main language medium. According to the last inspection conducted by Estyn in 2019, approximately 90% of the pupils spoke Welsh at home. In 2015, approximately 96% of pupils were fluent in Welsh.

Ysgol Gynradd Bethel was previously named Bethel British School and was located on a different site. The old school was opened on 11 April 1864 with 71 pupils. In October 1881 the school was reopened, with the current name.

== Sport ==
Bethel Juniors Football Club is one of the most successful junior clubs in North Wales, producing many players who go on to play at Academy level. In the 2009/10 season, the under 16s became only the second Gwyrfai League team to win the North Wales Coast F.A. Cup, beating Towyn Rangers in the final 2–1 at Denbigh Town F.C.

== Governance ==
=== Local Government ===
Bethel forms part of the Bethel a'r Felinheli electoral ward, which is represented on Cyngor Gwynedd by Plaid Cymru councillors Sasha Ellen Fraser Williams and Gwion Emyr.

The village is also within the area of Llanddeiniolen Community Council, whose current chair is Gareth Hughes.

=== Senedd ===
The village is currently represented in the Senedd by Arfon constituency member Siân Gwenllian (Plaid Cymru). It is also represented by four North Wales regional members, namely Carolyn Thomas (Labour), Llyr Huws Gruffydd (Plaid Cymru), Sam Rowlands and Mark Isherwood (Welsh Conservatives).

=== House of Commons ===
The village is currently represented in the House of Commons by Dwyfor Meirionnydd constituency member Liz Saville Roberts (Plaid Cymru).

== Notable people ==
- Selwyn Griffith (1928–2011), bardic name Selwyn Iolen, Archdruid for the National Eisteddfod, 2005-2008.
- Angharad Price (born 1972), a Welsh academic, novelist and recipient of the Glyndŵr Award
