= Glenys Cour =

Welsh artist (born 1924)

- Born: Glenys Irene Carthew; 6 January 1924 (age 102); Fishguard, Pembrokeshire, Wales
- Education: Cardiff College of Art
- Known for: Painting, stained glass, collage, artist books
- Spouse: Ronald Cour
- Elected: The Welsh Group; Royal Cambrian Academy
- Website: www.glenyscour.co.uk

Glenys Irene Cour MBE (née Carthew, born 6 January 1924) is a Welsh artist.

== Biography ==
Cour was born in Fishguard, Pembrokeshire, Wales on 6 January 1924. From 1945 until 1948, she studied at Cardiff College of Art under Ceri Richards and married the sculptor Ronald Cour in 1949. From 1963 to 2000, she taught painting and architectural glass at Swansea Institute of Higher Education, and the University of Wales, Swansea.

Cour has been a member of The Welsh Group for a number of years, taking part in many of the group's exhibitions, including its 50th anniversary in 1998. She was elected Royal Cambrian Academician in 2009 and is also one of the founding artists of Swansea's Mission Gallery.

Cour turned 100 on 6 January 2024.

== Artwork ==
Cour's artwork is primarily concerned with colour and light, using landscape, flowers, various culturally charged objects, like ancient Greek artefacts or Celtic stones, and mythology, especially the mythology of Wales and the multiplely layered tales of the Mabinogion. Glenys has never used a paintbrush, choosing instead to work with the "immediacy" of oil paint, applying it with torn fabric pieces and her fingers.

Cour's artwork includes painting on canvas and paper, stained glass, collage, paper making, posters, projections and artist books. Her use of materials has changed through the years, from the landscape painting of the 1970s, leading into a greater use of collage and abstraction from the 1980s, working predominantly in glass for periods and in 2007 illustrating a book with Old Stile Press.

== Exhibitions ==
Glenys Cour's artwork has been exhibited widely in Europe and the US, with major exhibitions in her home country of Wales at St. David's Hall in 1991, Glynn Vivian Art Gallery in 2003, the Attic Gallery, Swansea in 2005 and a major retrospective exhibition, curated by Mel Gooding, at the Glynn Vivian Art Gallery in 2014. Film maker Toril Brancher was commissioned by the gallery to make a film about Glenys Cour and her artwork as part of the exhibition.

Her artwork is held in several public and private collections, including the Glynn Vivian Art Gallery, The National Museum of Wales, The Kunsthalle Mannheim Museum, Swansea University, the University of South Wales and Y Gaer.

== Awards ==
- 1989 Best poster for British Arts Festival Association.
- 1992 Painter in glass commission – Glynn Vivian Art Gallery.
- 2004 Honorary Fellow of the Swansea Institute of Higher Education.
- 2006 MA (Honorary) Swansea University.

Cour was appointed Member of the Order of the British Empire (MBE) in the 2020 Birthday Honours for services to the visual arts in Wales.

== Publications ==
Glenys Cour: Paintings and Works on Paper 1980–2003, Mel Gooding and Peter Wakelin, 2003, Glynn Vivian Art Gallery, ISBN 9780903189682
