= The Welsh Group =

Welsh artists' collective

The Welsh Group Y Grŵp Cymreig (Welsh)
- Formation: 1948
- Type: Visual arts
- Location: Wales
- Members: ~40
- Website: www.thewelshgroup-art.com

The Welsh Group (Welsh: Y Grŵp Cymreig) is an artists' collective, with the purpose of exhibiting and "giving a voice" to the visual arts in Wales.

== Beginnings ==
The group began in 1948 as the South Wales Group, consisting of both professional and amateur artists. The group's initial conception was a response to the Royal Cambrian Academy's relatively weak representation from south Wales at that time. In the foreword to the South Wales Group’s first exhibition catalogue, David Bell wrote "It is the purpose of the Group to establish a new link between the artists of South Wales and their public".

During the 1960s the South Wales Group had begun exhibiting further afield in north and mid Wales and into Bristol and Shrewsbury. The group adopted its current, broader title of The Welsh Group by 1975, by which time it had also become a fully professional artists' group and, though its south east tendency is still an issue of some contention, the group had expanded its membership beyond south Wales (including a number who are also members of the Royal Cambrian Academy and/or the 56 Group Wales, a splinter group initiated in 1956 when the South Wales Group failed to become a southern Academy).

== 21st century ==
In 2008, an exhibition curated and researched by Welsh Group member Ceri Thomas and funded by The National Library of Wales, Arts Council of Wales, Contemporary Art Society for Wales, and the Welsh Group, was launched at the National Library of Wales, (Aberystwyth), before touring to the Royal Cambrian Academy, and Newport Museum & Art Gallery. The exhibition, Mapping The Welsh Group at 60, included work by current and past members spanning a period from soon after the second world war to work completed in the twenty-first century, just after Welsh devolution. At the exhibition launch Welsh Government Heritage Minister at the time Alun Ffred Jones highlighted the group's importance: "The Welsh Group's 60th anniversary exhibition is a major event for the arts in Wales, bringing together work from talented Welsh artists old and new". A fully illustrated colour book published by Diglot Books accompanied the exhibition.

Today the group exhibits in Wales and internationally, including exchange exhibitions with visual art groups in the USA and Germany.

== Membership ==
Full membership is made up of approximately 40 Welsh or Wales-based artists, including:

- Sue Hiley Harris
- Paul Edwards
- Heather Eastes
- Anthony Evans
- Christine Evans
- Veronica Gibson
- Chris Griffin
- Jacqueline Jones
- Angela Kingston
- Gus Payne
- Jacqueline Alkema
- Jenny Allan
- Lynne Bebb
- Simone Bizzell-Browning
- Paul Brewer
- Glenys Cour
- Ivor Davies
- Ken Dukes
- Wendy Earl
- Lorna Edmiston
- Ken Elias
- Robert Harding
- Mary Husted
- Dilys Jackson
- Maggie James
- Kay Keogh
- Robert Macdonald
- Philip Nicol
- Shirley Anne Owen
- Roy Powell
- Sue Roberts
- Gerda Roper
- Alan Salisbury
- Philippine Sowerby
- Thomasin Toohie
- Philip Watkins
- Jean Walcot
- Jess Woodrow
- Pip Woolf
- Karin Mear

As of April 2024 the chair is Paul Edwards, the secretary Neil Stone, and the treasurer Heather Eastes. Since 2002, with the deaths of a number of long lasting members, new members were elected, resulting in a greater gender balance and an increase in members from outside Cardiff.

From 2007 the group has included a graduate member, and in 2012 artist Tiff Oben began a three-year fellowship with the group.

Mathew Prichard CBE is the group's president.

=== Former members ===
Former members have included major names from the field of modern Welsh art including Peter Bailey, William Brown, Brenda Chamberlain, Mary Fogg, Arthur Giardelli, Tony Goble, Bert Isaac, John Petts, David Tinker, Islwyn Watkins, Laurie Williams and Ernest Zobole.

== Publications ==
- Eastes, Heather; et al. (2014). Yma ac Acw / Hier und Da / Here and There. The Welsh Group / BBK Düsseldorf. ISBN 9780956086723.
- Moore, David (2018). Y Grŵp Cymreig yn 70 / The Welsh Group at 70. Crooked Window / Ffenest Gam. ISBN 9780956086730.
- Thomas, Ceri (2009). Mapping The Welsh Group at 60. Llantrisant: Diglot Books. ISBN 9780956086709.
- Wakelin, Peter (1999). Creu cymuned o arlunwyr: 50 mlynedd o'r Grŵp Cymreig/Creating an art community: 50 years of the Welsh Group. Cardiff: National Museum of Wales. ISBN 0-7200-0472-1.
