= MOMA, Wales =

MOMA Machynlleth
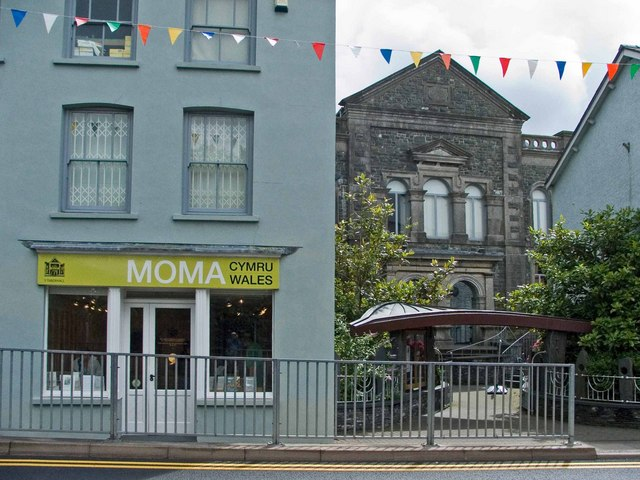

- Museum location in Powys, Wales
- Established: 1994
- Location: Machynlleth, Powys, Wales
- Coordinates: 52.5916°N 3.8524°W
- Type: Art museum
- Website: www.moma.cymru

MOMA Machynlleth or Museum of Modern Art, Machynlleth (Formerly MOMA Wales(Welsh: MOMA Cymru)) is an arts centre and gallery adjacent to Y Tabernacl (The Tabernacle) in Machynlleth, Powys, Wales.

The Tabernacle was converted in the mid-1980s from a Wesleyan chapel into a centre for the performing arts. Since then the Museum of Modern Art has grown up alongside it, with six exhibition spaces.

== Background ==
MOMA Machynlleth originated as MOMA Wales in 1986 as Y Tabernacl, a centre of performing arts in an old chapel, a private initiative by businessman Andrew Lambert. In 1994 this was expanded with a new complex of art galleries, a recording studio and a language laboratory. In 2016 it gained accreditation from the Museums, Archives and Libraries Division of the Welsh Government and changed its name to MOMA Machynlleth.

== Events and exhibitions ==
The Machynlleth Festival takes place in the Auditorium in late August every year. During the week events take place ranging from recitals for children to jazz. Special features are the Hallstatt Lecture on some aspects of Celtic culture and the Glyndŵr Award for an Outstanding Contribution to the Arts in Wales.

Throughout the year MOMA shows a series of temporary exhibitions.

In August the international Tabernacle Art Competition takes place.

== The Tabernacle Collection ==
The Tabernacle Collection contains over 400 works and concentrates largely on artists living and working in Wales in the 20th and 21st centuries. Paintings and drawings from the Tabernacle Collection are shown in rotation. Works in this permanent collection include Portrait of William McElroy by Augustus John, Toasting by Stanley Spencer and Portrait of a Woman by Percy Wyndham Lewis. MOMA Wales owns Waterfall, Ogwen, Cottages, Cilgwyn, Carreg Cennen and Road above Deiniolen by Sir Kyffin Williams. The Brotherhood of Ruralists is represented by Graham Arnold's Last Poems (A E Housman) and Journal 1997 and by Ann Arnold's Clare's Countryside (8) and The River Dyfi. There are also two drawings of Dylan Thomas by his friend Mervyn Levy.

Peter Prendergast (Early Winter, Nant Ffrancon Valley and Study for Early Winter, Nant Ffrancon Valley) received the Glyndŵr Award in 2004, while Shani Rhys James (Night Kitchen I) is the designated recipient for 2007.

== The Tannery and the Rural Wales Award ==
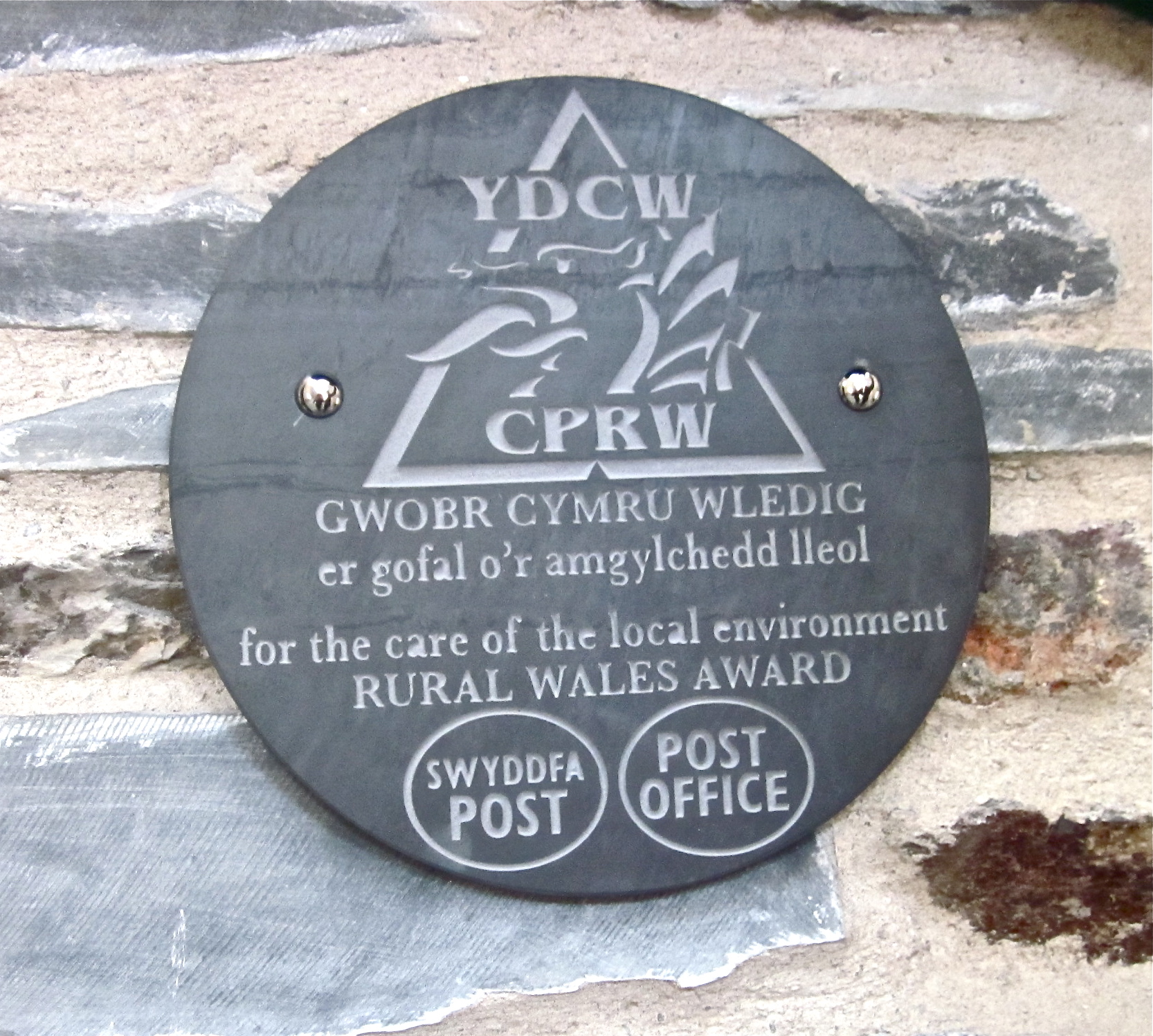
CPRW Rural Wales award, presented to the Tannery, Machynlleth

On 5 November 2014 the Montgomeryshire Branch of the Campaign for the Protection of Rural Wales (CPRW) made a special award, the Rural Wales Award, to MOMA for the restoration of the Tannery. The award was made in recognition of the sensitive and high quality restoration of the building. The Tannery was officially opened as an additional art and sculpture gallery at MOMA in May 2014 following its restoration. A detailed record of the building as well as the importance of the Tannery to the Machynlleth leather industry, was made before the conversion of the building into an art gallery.

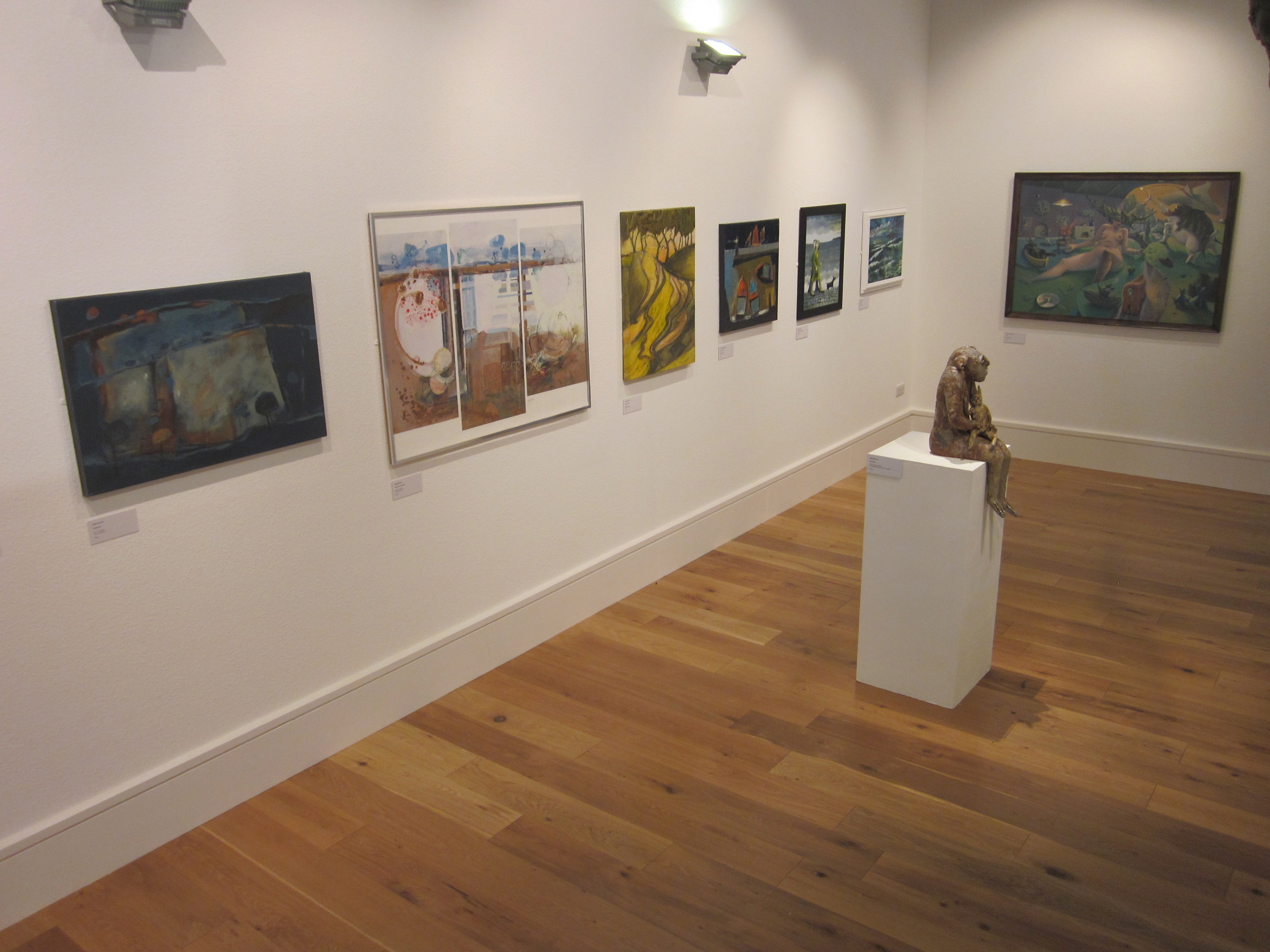
Display gallery at the Tannery, MOMA, Machynlleth

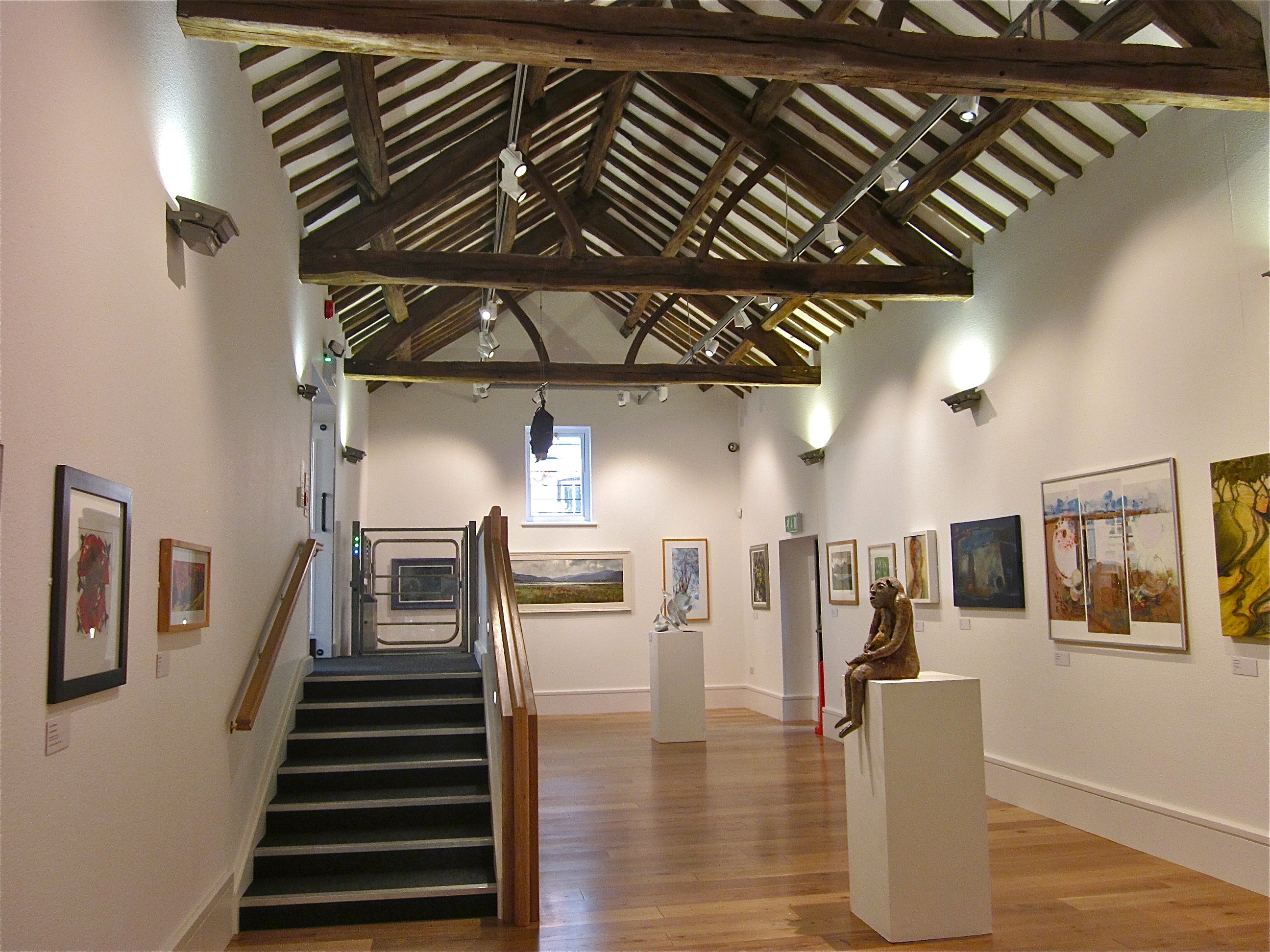
Display gallery at the Tannery, MOMA, Machynlleth

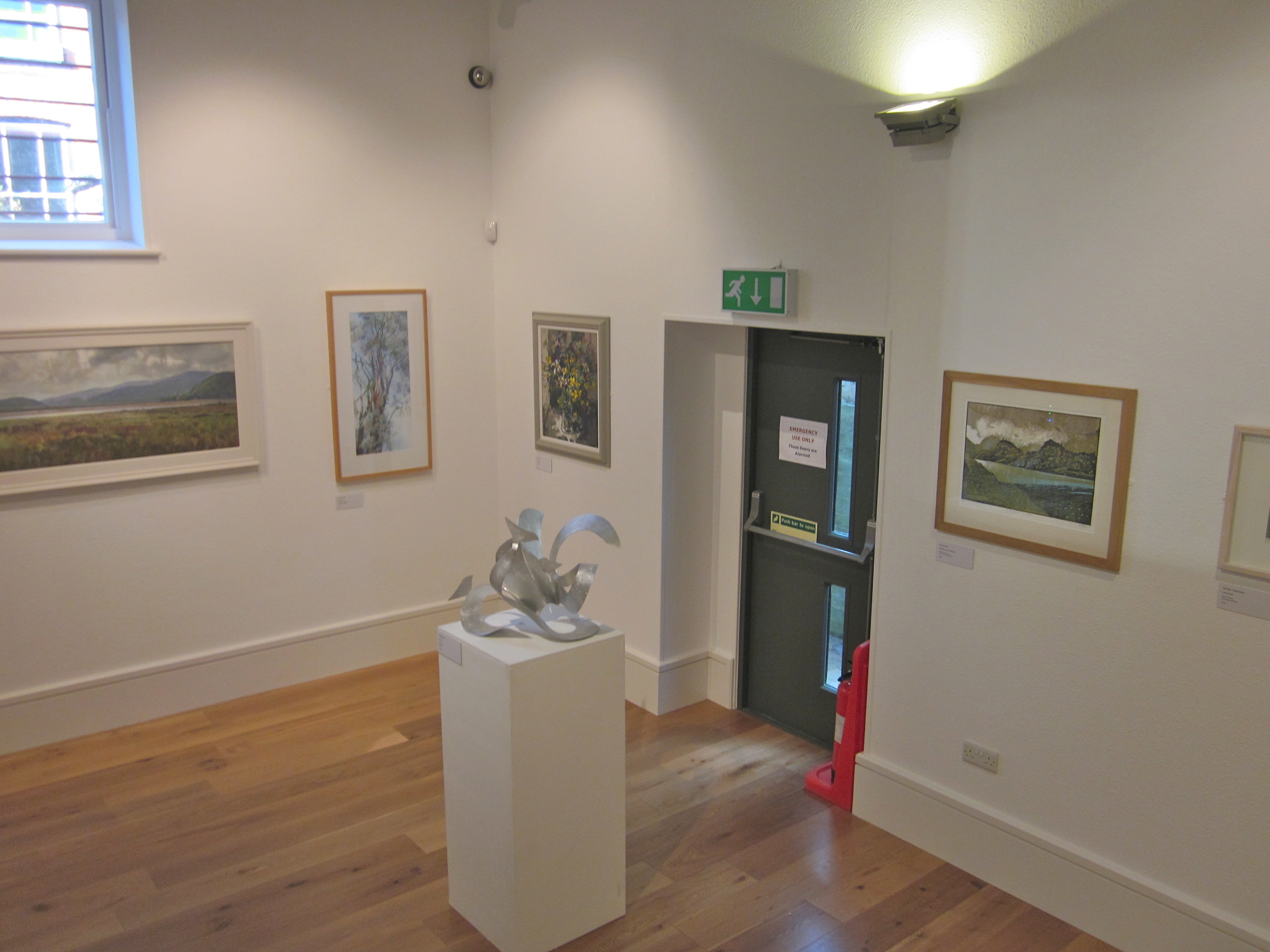
Display gallery at the Tannery, MOMA, Machynlleth

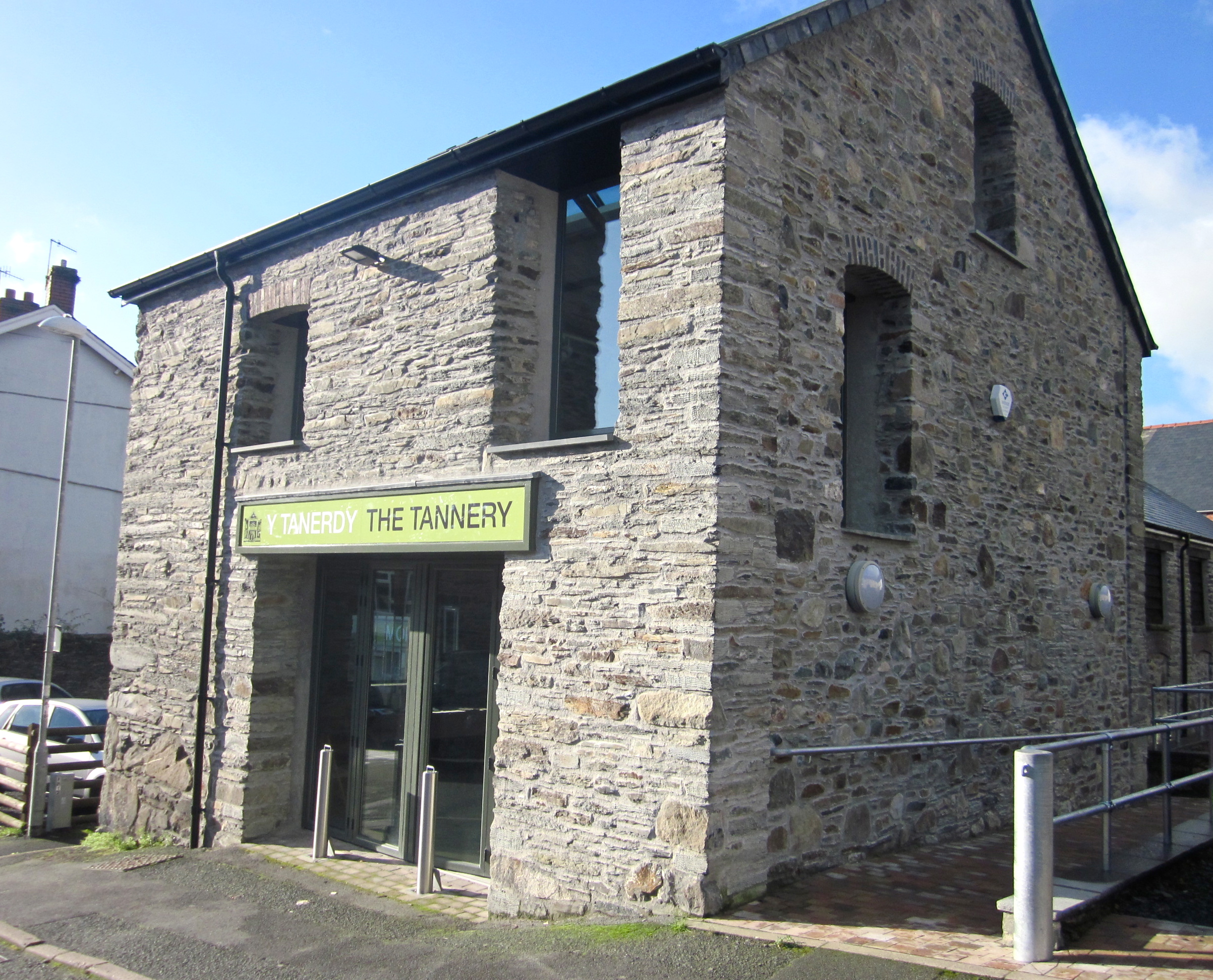
Street view of The Tannery, MOMA, Machynlleth

== Performance facilities ==
The Auditorium of The Tabernacle seats 325 people. Chamber and choral music, drama, lectures and conferences regularly take place here. A Steinway grand piano has been purchased; translation booths, recording facilities and a cinema screen have been installed; the oak-beamed Foyer has a bar; and access for the disabled.

Ty Llyfnant houses music teaching rooms and an art studio while the Green Room doubles as a Language Laboratory where Lifelong learning classes are held.
