= Tom Grattan's War =

1968 British television series

Tom Grattan's War is a British television series which ran from 1968 to 1970. The show revolved around the life of Tom Grattan who was sent to live with relatives in Yorkshire during the Great War. It was written by Bernie Cooper and David C. Rea.

== Plotlines and setting ==
Tom Grattan was a 15-year-old boy from London during World War I who is sent to live on a farm in Yorkshire for the duration of the war with his relatives, the Kirkby family. While living on the farm he has various adventures involving German spies, prejudice towards resident enemy aliens, saboteurs, escaped POWs, criminals and secret weapons.

The series was filmed entirely on location in rural Yorkshire including making use of various rundown and abandoned castles, quarries and factories although the show did also feature vintage stock footage from the war.

The story-lines ranged with some plots carrying over for multiple chapters while other episodes were stand alone.

Unusually for a drama television series, the episodes included a narrator who would sometimes appear on screen.

== Cast ==
- Michael Howe as Tom Grattan
- Sally Adcock as Julie Kirkby
- Connie Merigold as Mrs Kirkby
- George Malpas as Stan Hobbs
- Richard Warner as the Host/Narrator

Artist Clive Hicks-Jenkins appeared as a guest star in one multiple episode story line. Some episodes were directed by Ronald Eyre and others by Stephen Frears.

== Broadcast history ==
26 episodes were produced by Yorkshire Television with the show originally airing between 1968 and 1970 in Britain and was also carried in Canada on TV Ontario and in America on the American Broadcasting Company network. Also shown on Irish television. It was released on Region 2 DVD in July 2009.

== Other media ==
Stories from the series were also adapted in paperback book form.
