= Angharad Price =

Welsh academic and novelist

- Born: 1972 (age 53–54); Bethel, Gwynedd, Wales
- Occupation: Novelist

Academic background
- Education: Jesus College, Oxford

Angharad Price FLSW is a Welsh academic and novelist. She is a recipient of the Glyndŵr Award.

== Biography ==
Price was born in Bethel, Gwynedd, Wales, the daughter of the Welsh historian Emyr Price. She graduated with a BA and DPhil in Modern Languages from Jesus College, Oxford. She teaches at Bangor University, where she was made Professor of Welsh in 2014, and works on Welsh prose of the modern era. She currently lives in Caernarfon.

Price's first novel, Tania’r Tacsi, was published in 1999. Her second novel, O! Tyn y Gorchudd!, won the National Eisteddfod Prose Medal in 2002 and was named Welsh Language Book of the Year by the Welsh Arts Council at the Hay Festival in 2003. An English translation of the novel, called The Life of Rebecca Jones, was also published in 2010. Her third novel, Caersaint, was published in 2010.

In 2014, Price received the Glyndŵr Award at the Machynlleth Festival.

In 2015, Price was elected a Fellow of the Learned Society of Wales.

== Publications ==
=== Non-fiction ===
- Rhwng Gwyn a Du (2002)
- Chwileniwm: Llenyddiaeth a Thechnoleg (2002; ed.)
- Ffarwél i Freiburg (2013)
- Translation Studies: Special Issue Wales (2016; co-editor with Helena Miguélez-Carballeira and Judith Kaufmann)
- Gororion: Llên Cymru yng Nghyfandir Ewrop (2023)

=== Novels ===
- Caersaint (2010)
- Nelan a Bo (2024)

=== Drama ===
- Nansi (2017)
- Congrinero (2025)

=== Other ===
- Ymbapuroli (2021)
