= Jeffery Beam =

American poet

Jeffery Beam (born 4 April 1953, Concord, North Carolina) is a gay American poet, writer, and editor who frequently collaborates with composers and visual artists.

== Early life and education ==
Jeffery Scott Beam was born in Concord, North Carolina and grew up in nearby Kannapolis. Beam attended the Kannapolis City School system, graduating in 1971 from A. L. Brown High School where he was editor of the campus newspaper, Brown Beat. Beam received his Bachelor of Creative Arts in Writing from University of North Carolina at Charlotte in 1975, an experimental program inspired by Black Mountain College and other independent and experimental programs. He was the editor of the campus literary magazine Sanskrit and a contributing editor to other local student publications.

== Work ==
Jeffery Beam was poetry and reviews editor of the online literary journal Oyster Boy Review from 1997 – 2014, before becoming Editor Emeritus. In 2001, he was awarded First Place for editing the Best Poetry E-zine by Writers Digest. Beam has written reviews for the Lambda Book Report, Harvard Gay & Lesbian Review, and published in numerous gay literary journals and anthologies, including Son of the Male Muse and Black Men/White Men. He was a judge for the Lambda Literary Awards from 1989 to 1999.

Beam is the author of over 25 works, influenced by his friendship with poet, photographer, and The Jargon Society publisher Jonathan Williams, who died in 2008. Beam's work on Williams includes co-editing with Richard Owens, The Lord of Orchards: Jonathan Williams at 80, originally an online feature in Jacket magazine, which led to Jonathan Williams: The Lord of Orchards (Prospecta Press, 2018), an expanded book-length survey of Williams' life and work. A Snowflake Orchard, a personal history with a bibliography of The Jargon Society, appeared in the North Carolina Literary Review. Tales of a Jargonaut, a lightly edited interview with Jonathan Williams by Beam, was published in Rain Taxi in 2003.

Beam's book An Elizabethan Bestiary: Retold, illustrated by Ippy Patterson, was awarded a grant from the Mary Duke Biddle Foundation. It also won a 1999 American Institute of Graphic Arts 50 Books / 50 Covers award, and a 2000 IPPY Award for one of the 10 Outstanding Small Press / Independent Publisher Books of 1999. His two CD multimedia collection What We Have Lost: New and Selected Poems 1977-2001 was an Audio Publishers Award finalist. His poem "Song of the University Worker" was adopted in 2009 as the official University of North Carolina at Chapel Hill staff poem.

Beam and photographer John M. Hall co-curated an exhibition of Hall's photographs of Harlem Renaissance poet Anne Spencer's Lynchburg home for the UNC-Chapel Hill Center for the Study of the American South in 2015. Collaborating with ceramicist Judith Ernst in 2016 led to the creation of two large vessels carved with his poems, Holding the Center (North Carolina Ceramics collection Mint Museum, Charlotte), and Pause … Now Go (North Carolina Pottery collection, BRAHM – Blowing Rock Art and History Museum).

Beam's archive is included in the University of North Carolina at Chapel Hill's Special Collections. There are smaller collections at the J. Murrey Atkins Library of the University of North Carolina at Charlotte; the ONE Archives at the University of Southern California; the Stonewall National Museum, Archives, and Library in Fort Lauderdale, Florida.

== Personal life ==
A retired assistant to the Botany (later Biology) librarian at the University of North Carolina at Chapel Hill, Beam lives in Hillsborough, North Carolina, with husband Stanley Fitch. Their marriage in 2014 was the first legal gay marriage to be recorded in the register of the Chapel of the Cross in Chapel Hill. The events surrounding their civil ceremony were documented by journalist Raymond Whitehouse.

== Selected bibliography ==
- The Golden Legend Floating Island Publications (1981)
- Two Preludes for the Beautiful. Universal (1981)
- Midwinter Fires. French Broad (1990)
- The Fountain. North Carolina Wesleyan College Press (1992)
- Visions of Dame Kind. The Jargon Society (1995)
- little. Green Finch Press (1997)
- Submergences. Off the Cuff Books (1997). Reprinted in Madder Love: Queer Men and the Precincts of Surrealism (Rebel Satori Press, 2008)
- Light and Shadow (with photographer Claire Yaffa). Aperture (1998)
- An Elizabethan Bestiary: Retold (Signed and numbered edition). Horse and Buggy Press (1999).
- The Beautiful Tendons: Uncollected Queer Poems 1969-1997, White Crane Wisdom Series Volume 7, White Crane Books (2008)
- Midwinter Fires (new edition of the 1990 publication, with an introduction by Joe Donahue). Seven Kitchens Press (2011)
- The NEW Beautiful Tendons: Collected Queer Poems 1969-2012 (expanded edition of the 2008 publication). Spuyten Duyvil/Triton Press (2012)
- Jonathan Williams: The Lord of Orchards, (co-editor with Richard Owens) Prospecta Press (2017)
- Spectral Pegasus / Dark Movements (collaboration with Welsh painter Clive Hicks-Jenkins) Kin Press (2018)
- Verdant (Kin Press (2022)

Limited editions of Jeffery Beam's work from fine presses include:

- An Elizabethan Bestiary: Retold - A limited numbered set included a signed and numbered large letterpress poster of Beam's poem "The Ibex". Horse and Buggy Press, 1999.
- ENO Crow, Horse & Buggy Press/Green Finch Press (2016)
- MountSeaEden - hardcover, handbound, signed and numbered - Chester Creek Press (2012);

=== Visual art and collaborations ===
Selected poems set to music and recordings:

- Michelle Murray Fiertek - Every Tiny Thing. Albany Records, 2020. Includes “Love’s Astronomy”
- Lee Hoiby, Composer – "The Life of the Bee" song cycle, premiered at Carnegie's Weill Recital Hall in 2001, read by Beam; included on the CD Shauna Holiman & Friends: New Growth.
- Shauna Holliman - Shauna Holiman & Friends: New Growth - New Songs & Spoken Poems, Albany Records, 2002. Includes Lee Hoiby's "Life of the Bee".
- Holt McCarley, Composer – "The Hyena"
- Andrea Edith Moore - Searching the Heart, Composers Concordance Records, 2024. Includes “Love’s Astronomy”; Family Secrets: Kith and Kin. Albany Records, 2020. Includes “Porch Song”
- Steven Sérpa, Composer – Heaven's Birds: Lament and Song (for mezzo-soprano soloist, SATB chorus, string trio, and piano, 2008; "An Invocation" (for oboe or soprano sax and string trio, 2012/2016); The Creatures: a bestiary retold for two voices and piano (or Pierrot ensemble), 2016-2017
- Tony Solitro, Composer – "Love's Astronomy" (voice and piano, 2018), "Apostrophe" (baritone and piano, 2019) and "A Stone Falling" (soprano and piano, 2020); "sharp horizons-gentle plains" (clarinet, violin, and piano, 2019) and "Love's Astronomy II" (clarinet and harp, 2019)
- Frank E. Warren, Composer – "The Poppy Suite," "The Way it Happened," and "A Garden of Flowers" (song cycles).
