= David Tress =

British painter (born 1955)

David Tress (born 1955, London) is a British painter noted particularly for his deeply personal interpretations of landscapes in and around his home in Pembrokeshire, southwest Wales. He combines the techniques of collage and impasto with conventional painting and drawing to produce results that have been categorized as a form of abstract expressionism.

== Early life ==
Tress was born in Wembley, northwest London, and studied at Harrow College of Art before graduating in Fine Arts from Trent Polytechnic, Nottingham (now Nottingham Trent University). In 1976 he moved to Pembrokeshire where he has lived ever since.

== Work and technique ==
Tress has followed an unorthodox route to painting. He was first interested by painter Ben Nicholson, and also the watercolours of John Singer Sargent. He then came across the Abstract Expressionists which continue to be an influence. By the time he moved to Wales Tress was making film, installation and performance art. In Pembrokeshire, Tress began painting local scenes in water-colour and other media, developing a highly detailed realism epitomized by works such as Winter Sun (1983) and First Sun, Preseli (1984). As well as Wales, his subjects include landscapes in Scotland, the Lake District, Ireland and southern France, along with cityscapes of London.

== Honours ==
He was one of 48 British artists and designers commissioned by the Royal Mail for the Millennium stamp series. His design, issued in September 1999 as part of a set called The Farmers’ Tale, depicted open-field farming at Laxton near Newark, Nottinghamshire. It was also Royal Mail’s contribution to that year’s Europa postage stamp issue on the theme of Parks and Reserves.

He was the recipient of the 2013 Glyndŵr Award for an Outstanding Contribution to the Arts in Wales.
