= Marly Youmans =

American poet

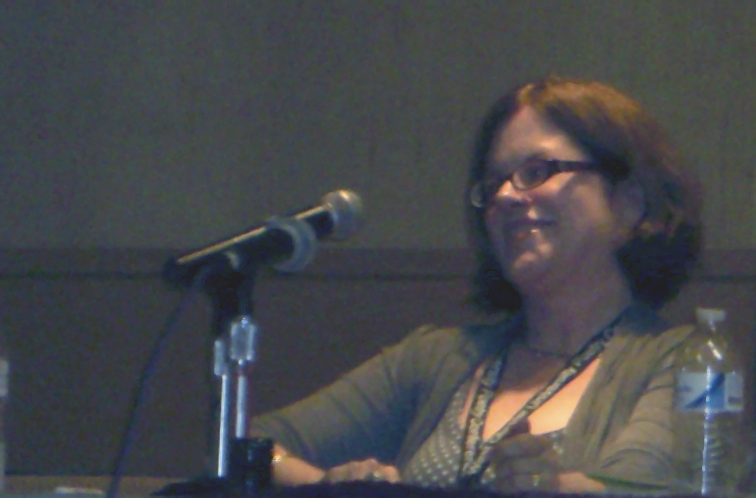
- Marly Youmans on a panel of "Poets Who Write Other Genres" at the 2012 West Chester University Poetry Conference
- Born: Susan Marlene Youmans; November 22, 1953 (age 72); Aiken, South Carolina, U.S.
- Occupations: Poet; novelist; short story writer
- Writing career
- Language: English
- Genres: poetry, novels, short stories, books for children
- Website: www.thepalaceat2.blogspot.com

Marly Youmans (born Susan Marlene Youmans; November 22, 1953 in Aiken, South Carolina) is an American poet, novelist and short story writer. Her work reflects certain recurring themes such as nature, magic, faith and redemption, and often references visual art.

== Background ==
Marly Youmans grew up in Louisiana, North Carolina, and elsewhere. She currently lives in the village of Cooperstown, New York, with her husband and three children. She graduated from Hollins College, Brown University, and University of North Carolina at Chapel Hill. She taught at State University of New York but quit academia after receiving promotion and tenure in her fifth year.

== Writing ==
Her published work consists of five books of poetry, eight novels and two fantasies for young readers, as well as uncollected short stories, essays and poems. Across all these idioms, her work displays a commitment to rhythm, the sound of words, imagery and complexity of form and allusion. Thaliad, for example, is an epic poem that tells a compelling story of children who survive an apocalypse to begin a new society, written as though a spoken history remembranced in blank verse a generation on. Her novels have been described as 'literary fiction at its finest' in Books and Culture while The Advocate has cited her skill at mastering poetic forms. The editor of Books and Culture says, "Youmans (pronounced like 'yeoman' with an 's' added) is the best-kept secret among contemporary American writers."

Her books demonstrate a number of continuing interests: in lives lived close to nature, whether in the past (Catherwood) or the future (Thaliad), magic, faith and redemption (Val/Orson, The Foliate Head) and the individual’s journey from youth to adulthood (Inglewood, A Death at the White Camelia Orphanage). Visual art is often referenced in her work and Charis in the World of Wonders, The Book of the Red King, Thaliad, The Foliate Head, Glimmerglass, and Maze of Blood were collaborations with the artist Clive Hicks-Jenkins with decorations throughout the texts. She provided the title poems for an illustrated anthology, The Book of Ystwyth: Six Poets on the Art of Clive Hicks-Jenkins.

== Awards ==
Youmans has been awarded many "book of the year" and "best of the year" citations by magazines, newspapers, and organizations. She is the winner of The Michael Shaara Award for Excellence in Civil War Fiction for The Wolf Pit, her third novel, which was also on the short list for The Southern Book Award. She is a two-time winner of the Theodore Hoepfner Award for the short story and the winner of the New Writers Award of Capital Magazine (New York), also for the short story. Her latest awards are The Ferrol Sams Award for Fiction and the Silver in fiction, ForeWord BOTYA Awards for A Death at the White Camellia Orphanage (Mercer University Press, 2012.) Glimmerglass and Maze of Blood were ForeWord BOTYA finalists. She has held fellowships from Yaddo, New York State, and elsewhere.

She was a judge of the 2012 National Book Awards.

== Bibliography ==
=== Novels ===
- Little Jordan (Boston: David R. Godine, 1995) ISBN 978-1-56792-029-1 (reprint Tempest, 1996)
- Catherwood. New York: Farrar, Straus & Giroux. 1996. ISBN 978-0-374-11972-0. (reprint Bard 1997)
- The Wolf Pit. New York: Farrar, Straus & Giroux. 2001. ISBN 978-0-374-29195-2. (reprint Harcourt, 2003, ISBN 978-0-15-602714-4)
- Val/Orson (Hornsea, UK: P. S. Publishing, 2009) 1-906301-51-4 / 9781906301514 (UK) dual jacketed/unjacketed limited editions
- A Death at the White Camellia Orphanage (Macon: Mercer University Press, 2012) 0881462713 / 9780881462715 (hardcover/paperback/ebook)
- Glimmerglass (Macon: Mercer University Press, 2014) ISBN 978-0881464917 (hardcover)
- Maze of Blood (Macon: Mercer University Press, 2015) ISBN 978-0881465365 (hardcover)
- Charis in the World of Wonders (San Francisco: Ignatius Press, 2020)ISBN 978-1621643043 (Sythe-sewn softbound with French flaps)

=== Poetry ===
- Claire: poems (Louisiana State University, 2003), ISBN 0-8071-2901-1 (dual hard/softcover)
- The Throne of Psyche (Mercer University Press - Poetry, 2011) ISBN 0881462322 ISBN 9780881462326 (dual hard/softcover)
- The Foliate Head (UK: Stanza Press, 2012) ISBN 978-1-848634-60-2
- Thaliad (Montreal, CA: Phoenicia Publishing, 2012) ISBN 978-0-9866909-3-8 (dual hard/softcover)
- The Book of the Red King (Montreal: Phoenicia Publishing, 2019) ISBN 978-1-927496-15-2 ISBN 978-1-927496-14-5 (dual hard/softcover)
- Seren of the Wildwood (Wiseblood Books, 2023) ISBN 978-1951319656 ISBN 978-1951319649 (dual hard/softcover)

=== Books for young adults ===
- Ingledove. Farrar, Straus & Giroux. 2005. ISBN 978-0-374-33599-1. (reprint Firebird, 2006, ISBN 978-0-14-240704-2)
- The Curse of the Raven Mocker. Farrar, Straus & Giroux. 2003. ISBN 978-0-374-31667-9. (reprint Firebird)

=== Essays ===
- 'Fire in the Labyrinth' in Simon Callow, Andrew Green, Rex Harley, Clive Hicks-Jenkins, Kathe Koja, Anita Mills, Montserrat Prat, Jacqueline Thalmann, Damian Walford Davies and Marly Youmans, Clive Hicks-Jenkins (2011: Lund Humphries) ISBN 978-1-84822-082-9, pp. 99–123

== Reviews ==
- Matthew Gilbert, "Lyrical Prose for a Coming of Age" (Little Jordan), The Boston Globe, December 31, 1995
- Philip Gambone, "Another Part of the Forest" (review of Catherwood), The New York Times Book Review, May 26, 1996
- Paula Friedman, "Fiction" (Catherwood) in The Washington Post, September 14, 1997
- Fred Chappell, "Catherwood," The Raleigh News and Observer, June 23, 1996
- Catherwood in Entertainment Weekly, March 14, 2014
- Bob Summer, "Novel of Civil War Soldier and Slave Transcends Genre" (The Wolf Pit), The Orlando Sentinel, February 10, 2002
- "The Wolf Pit" (starred review) at Publishers Weekly, 2001
- John Wilson, "The Top Ten Books of 2003" (The Curse of the Raven Mocker), Books and Culture Magazine, December 2003
- Greg Langley, Books Editor, "YA titles include very good books" (Ingledove, Best YA Fiction of 2005, TBRA) The Baton Rouge Advocate, June 5, 2005
- John Wilson, "Favorite Books of 2009" (Val/Orson, Book of the Year), Books and Culture Magazine, December 2009
- Randy Hoyt, "The Throne of Psyche," Mythprint of the Mythopoeic Society, 48:9 (350), September 2011
- John M. Formy-Duval, "A Death at the White Camellia Orphanage," About.com Contemporary Literature, 2012
- D. G. Myers, "Meursault goes home again" (A Death at the White Camellia Orphanage), A Commonplace Blog, December 12, 2012
- John Wilson, "Glimmerglass: A new novel by the 'best-kept secret among contemporary American writers,'" Books and Culture Magazine, November 2014
- Midori Snyder, "The Sublime Collaboration of Author Marly Youmans and Artist Clive Hicks-Jenkins: Thaliad," In the Labyrinth, October 18, 2012
- Rachel Barenblat, "Marly Youmans' Thaliad," Velveteen Rabbi, January 8, 2013
- Tom Atherton, "Glimmerglass by Marly Youmans," Strange Horizons, March 25, 2015
- Suzanne Brazil, "Glimmerglass, a Novel by Marly Youmans,", The Seattle Post-Intelligencer, January 19, 2015
- Jessica Hooten Wilson "The Recommendations of an Avid Reader" (The Book of the Red King), Fathom, December 18, 2019
- Ben Steelman, "A novel turn, rich and strange" (Glimmerglass), The Wilmington Star, November 9, 2014
- Midori Snyder, "An Early Review of Maze of Blood by Marly Youmans," pre-pub review at In the Labyrinth, February 24, 2015
- Suzanne Brazil, "Maze of Blood: A Novel by Marly Youmans," Blogcritics, December 28, 2015
- Jessica Hooten Wilson, "The Recommendations of an Avid Reader" at Fathom (The Book of the Red King), December 18, 2020
- Seth Wright, "A Plunge into the Mythic Wood: A Review of Seren of the Wildwood" at Front Porch Republic, April 10, 2023
