= Ken Elias =

Welsh artist (born 1944)

- Born: 1944 (age 81–82); Glynneath, South Wales
- Education: Newport College of Art & Design (now the University of South Wales) (BA Fine Art ) University College Cardiff (PGCE); UWIC (MA Fine Art)
- Known for: Painting
- Movement: Pop Art

Ken Elias is a Welsh artist. Born in 1944, into a working-class family in Glynneath, his childhood was formed during the 1950s. He attended art school in the 1960s, during the height of the Pop Art movement in the UK.

== Artwork ==
Ken Elias's work is held in a number of public collections, including the National Museum of Wales, the National Library of Wales, the Arts Council of Wales, Brecknock Museum & Art Gallery and the Contemporary Arts Society of Wales.

Using acrylic paint, photomontage and mixed media, Elias creates powerful, striking images, with strong shapes and contrasting colours. Influenced by the memories of family and cinema during his 1950s childhood and his love of poetry and art, his work uses memory and imagination, responding to and drawing inspiration from global issues and currents, while also being strongly rooted in the visual language of the south Wales valleys.

In 2009 the National Library of Wales launched a touring retrospective exhibition of his work titled; Ken Elias: A Retrospective – A celebration of 40 years of painting alongside a publication by Seren Books, edited by Ceri Thomas; Ken Elias: Thin Partitions'.

In April 2013, Elias' work was included in a major exhibition at the National Museum of Wales, Cardiff, titled Pop and Abstract, alongside work by David Hockney, Peter Blake, Allen Jones, Bridget Riley and others.

He is a member of both The Welsh Group and the 56 Group Wales.

== Public collections ==
- National Museum of Wales
- National Library of Wales
- Arts Council of Wales
- Brecknock Museum & Art Gallery
- West Wales Arts Association
- Bangor College Normal
- Contemporary Arts Society of Wales
- Carmarthen County Museum

== International exhibitions ==
- 1997 Art in Wales, European Parliament, Strasbourg, France.
- 1999 Touring exhibition by The Welsh Group to Limerick and Dublin, Ireland.
- 2000 Unterland Exhibition, Heilbronn, Germany.
- 2000/2001 Libramont, Belgium.
- 2002 Meta: Imaging the Imagination, Arka Galerija, Vilnius, Lithuania.
- 2003 Contemporary Art from Wales, Mortagne-sur-Gironde, France.
- 2003 Gross Innovations, Chicago, USA.
- 2013 The Welsh Group in partnership with American group ISEA, National Watercolor Society Gallery, San Pedro, CA, USA and BIG Arts, Sanibel Island, FL, USA.
- 2014 Yma Ac Acw / Hier Und Da / Here And There - The Welsh Group in partnership with German group BBK, Hilden and BBK Kunstforum Gallery, Duesseldorf, Germany.

== Publications ==
- Ken Elias: Thin Partitions, edited by Ceri Thomas, foreword by Dai Smith, together with essays by Hugh Adams, David Briers, Jon Gower, Anne Price-Owen and Ceri Thomas. Seren, 2009.
