= The Tabernacle, Machynlleth =

Arts venue and former chapel in Machynlleth, Powys, Wales

Coordinates: 52.5915°N 3.8524°W

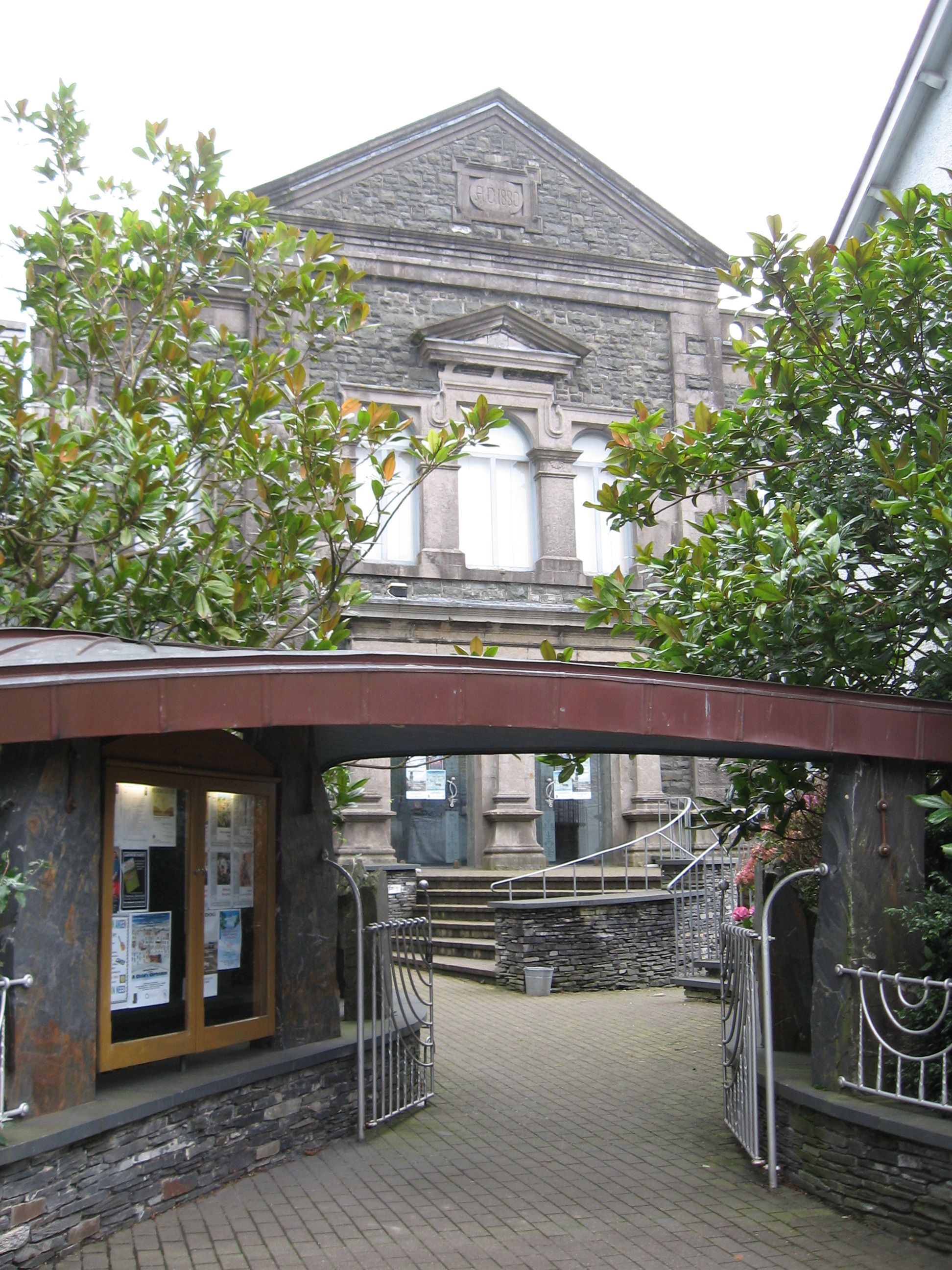
The Tabernacle

The Tabernacle (Welsh: Y Tabernacl ) is a centre for the performing arts in Machynlleth, Powys, Wales. It is located in a former Wesleyan chapel, which was converted in the mid-1980s and opened as a performing arts space in 1986. Since then, the Museum of Modern Art has grown alongside it, with six exhibition spaces.

The Tabernacle's auditorium seats 350 people and regularly hosts chamber and choral music, drama, lectures and conferences. It also has translation booths, a grand piano, recording facilities and a cinema screen. There is a bar in the foyer. There are music teaching rooms and an art studio in Ty Llyfnant. The green room doubles as a language laboratory where lifelong learning classes are held.

The Machynlleth Festival takes place in the auditorium annually in late August.

Since acquiring accreditation from the Museums, Archives and Libraries Division of the Welsh Government in 2016, the Trust owning the Tabernacle is known as "MOMA Machynlleth".

== See also ==
- Machynlleth Festival
- Hallstatt Lecture
- MOMA, Wales
