= Machynlleth Festival =

Welsh music festival

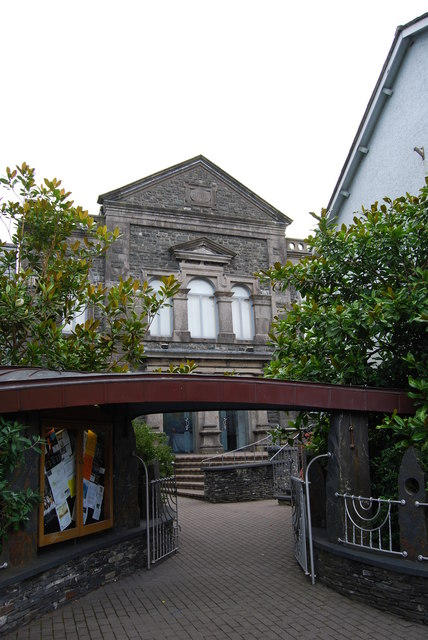
The Tabernacle

The Machynlleth Festival is an annual music festival that takes place in the auditorium of The Tabernacle, Machynlleth, Wales in late August. During the week eminent performers take part in events ranging from recitals for children to jazz.

== Events ==
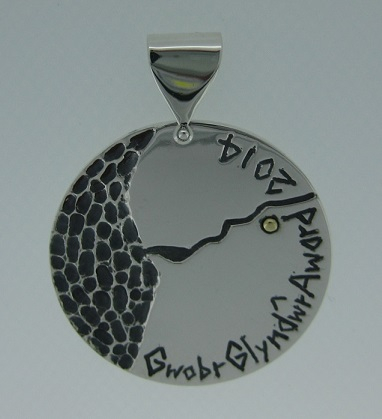
Glyndwr Award 2014

The festival begins with a sing-along of sacred hymns, the Cymanfa Ganu. Special features include the Hallstatt Lecture on some aspect of Celtic culture.

The Glyndŵr Award for an Outstanding Contribution to the Arts in Wales is given during the festival.

== Performers ==
Performers in the first three Machynlleth Festivals included tenor Paul Agnew (1987), oboist Nicholas Daniel (1988), soprano Elizabeth Vaughan (1988), actor Leonard Fenton (1988 and 1989), saxophonist Don Rendell (1989) and bass-baritone Bryn Terfel (1989). Among the Festival performers in the next few years were: Alan Skidmore, tenor saxophonist, 1990; Bernard Roberts, pianist, and Kit and The Widow, 1991; and Robin Williamson of the Incredible String Band, 1992.

The 1994 Festival, the last to contain four events per day for eight days, featured musicologist John Amis, violinist Tasmin Little, soprano Joan Rodgers, clarinettist Emma Johnson and pianist Joshua Rifkin. In 1995 the Festival was reduced for reasons of economy to two events each day, more or less the pattern of the first Festival. Performers included broadcaster Richard Baker and mezzo-soprano Sarah Walker.

Jazz singer George Melly and trombonist Christian Lindberg were amongst the highlights of 1996.
