= Hallstatt Lecture =

The Hallstatt Lecture is an hour-long lecture in any European language on some aspect of ancient and modern Celtic culture. It is given at The Tabernacle, Machynlleth in Wales at lunchtime on the Wednesday of each Machynlleth Festival.

== Past lecturers ==
- 1991 Professor J. E. Caerwyn Williams
- 1992 Morfydd Owen
- 1993 Emeritus Professor Dafydd Jenkins
- 1994 Frank Delaney
- 1995 Unknown
- 1996 John Meirion Morris
- 1997 Gwynn ap Gwilym
- 1998 Graham and Ann Arnold
- 1999 Trevor Fishlock
- 2000 Murray Chapman
- 2001 Dr Marion Loffler
- 2002 Simon Jenkins
- 2003 Professor Alistair Crawford
- 2004 Dr Damian Walford Davies
- 2005 Derec Llwyd Morgan
