= Glyndŵr Award =

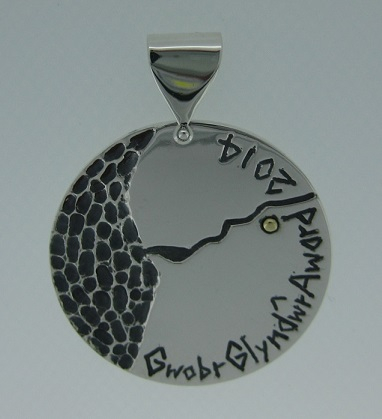
Glyndwr Award 2014

The Glyndŵr Award (Welsh: Gwobr Glyndŵr) is made for an outstanding contribution to the arts in Wales. It is given by the Machynlleth Tabernacle Trust to pre-eminent figures in music, art and literature in rotation. The award takes its name after Owain Glyndŵr, who convened a parliament at Machynlleth in 1404.

The award consists of a large medal in silver, bearing a stylised design of Cardigan Bay and the Dyfi river, with the location of Machynlleth marked by an inlaid bead of pure unmixed 18ct Welsh gold from the Gwynfynydd gold mine, near Ganllwyd, Dolgellau. The bilingual Glyndŵr medal was designed in 1995 by designer and goldsmith Kelvin Jenkins, whose studio is now in Borth, Ceredigion, and has been handmade by him for presentation to every winner since then.

== Recipients ==
- The composer Ian Parrott (1994)
- The painter Sir Kyffin Williams (1995)
- The writer Jan Morris (1996)
- The composer Alun Hoddinott (1997)
- The painter Iwan Bala (1998)
- The poet Gillian Clarke (1999)
- The harpist Robin Huw Bowen (2000)
- The sculptor John Meirion Morris (2001)
- The poet Gerallt Lloyd Owen (2002)
- The harpist Elinor Bennett (2003)
- The painter Peter Prendergast (2004)
- The historian Dr John Davies (2005)
- The composer Rhian Samuel (2006)
- The painter Shani Rhys James (2007)
- The poet bard Tudur Dylan Jones (2008)
- The pianist Llŷr Williams (2009)
- The sculptor David Nash RA (2010)
- The writer Mererid Hopwood (2011)
- The conductor and musicologist David Russell Hulme (2012)
- The painter David Tress (2013)
- The writer Angharad Price (2014)
- The conductor and pianist Eirian Owen (2015)
- The writer Dylan Iorwerth (2017)
- The composer Sir Karl Jenkins (2018)

== See also ==
- List of European art awards
