= Royal Cambrian Academy of Art =

Art school in Conwy, Wales

The Royal Cambrian Academy of Art (RCA) (Welsh: Yr Academi Frenhinol Gymreig (AFG)) is a centre of excellence for art in Wales. Its main gallery is located in Conwy and it has over a hundred members.

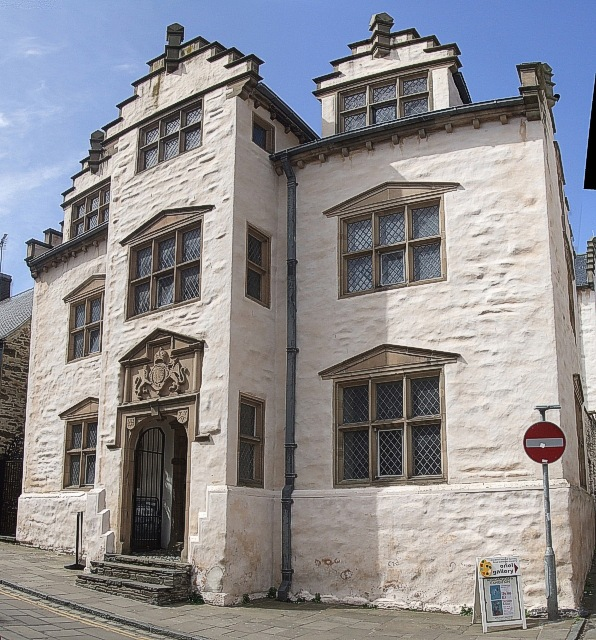
Plas Mawr, Conwy

== Early history ==
During the 19th century there were numerous attempts to establish an academy in Wales comparable to those already in existence in England, Scotland and Ireland. The Royal Cambrian Academy of Art was eventually founded in 1881, by a group of mainly English painters led by Henry Clarence Whaite, many of whom were now based in the Conwy Valley. The group of 31 founding members included Bernard Walter Evans. Ever since political unrest had made the Grand Tour hazardous for travellers, the wilds of North Wales became a fashionable alternative for English artists, in particular the area around Betws-y-Coed which attracted the likes of David Cox. The coming of the railways later aided artists from Liverpool and Manchester in transporting their art materials to Wales. These artists arranged to meet a group of like-minded Welsh artists at Llandudno Junction, and from this meeting a group was formed called the Cambrian Academy of Art.

Although they had no permanent gallery, they circulated their prospectus to other artists in Wales and their numbers began to grow. Initially they only exhibited their work in north Wales, but they later extended membership to the south of the country. The Academy's rapid growth was recognised the year after its formation, when in 1882 Queen Victoria commanded that it should be styled the 'Royal' Cambrian Academy of Art. Originally based in Llandudno, where there were already a number of commercial art galleries in the town, catering for the growing tourist trade, the academy later moved its operations to Plas Mawr in Conwy. Plas Mawr, an Elizabethan town house which the Academy shared with a local junior school, was offered to the group under lease by Lord Mostyn. The town house, which at the time was in a state of neglect, was restored by the Academy. Although an impressive historic building, Plas Mawr was not a natural gallery, and in 1896 an annexe was added to house the Victoria Gallery.

== Twentieth century ==
In 1934 the Royal Cambrian Academy gained one of its most notable Presidents, when Augustus John accepted the role, holding the title until 1939. Another president, from 1962 to 1967, was Alfred Burgess Sharrocks—better known for illustrating works by Enid Blyton.

In 1994, inspired by the efforts of their then President, Sir Kyffin Williams, the Academy broke its ties with Plas Mawr, opening a new gallery close to their old headquarters in Conwy.

The Academy's present President is Jeremy Yates and Vice President is Ann Lewis, while its patron is Charles, Prince of Wales.

In April 2025, the academy showed signs of decline, warning that it only had around 4 months left to stay open. In August of the same year, they announced that they would close in 24 August.

== Bibliography ==
- Davies, John; Jenkins, Nigel (2008). The Welsh Academy Encyclopaedia of Wales. Cardiff: University of Wales Press. ISBN 978-0-7083-1953-6.
