= Burkitt =

Burkitt is a name of Old English origin, and may refer to:

- Denis Parsons Burkitt (1911–1993), Irish surgeon
- Evaline Hilda Burkitt (1876–1955), British suffragette
- Francis Crawford Burkitt (1864–1935), British theologian and scholar
- Francis Hassard Burkitt (1822–1894), Irish Anglican priest
- Frank Burkitt (1843–1914), American newspaper editor and politician
- H. H. Burkitt (1876–1961), Irish-Indian civil servant
- Jack Burkitt (1926–2003), English footballer
- James Parsons Burkitt (1870–1959), Irish civil engineer and ornithologist
- M. C. Burkitt (1890–1971), British archaeologist and prehistorian
- Robert Burkitt (fl. c. 1912–1940), Irish Anglican priest
- William Burkitt (1650–1703), English scholar and educator
- William Burkitt (judge) (1838–1908), Irish judge
- William John Dwyer Burkitt (1872–1918), British-Indian judge

== See also ==
- AqBurkitt
- Burkitt's lymphoma
- Burkitt Nunatak
