= Kenneth Tew =

Scottish-American pharmacologist, academic and author

Kenneth D. Tew
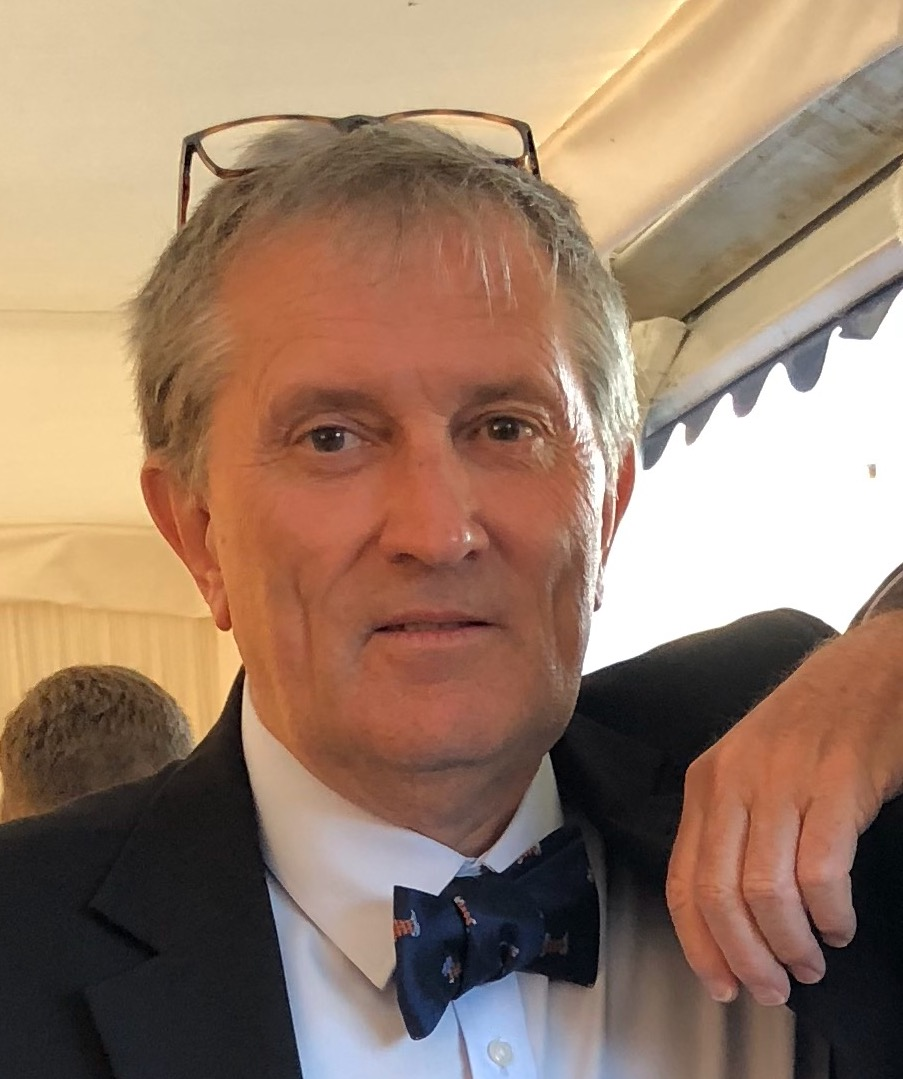
- Born: Dumbarton, Scotland
- Occupations: Pharmacologist, academic and author
- Spouse: Danyelle Townsend

Academic background
- Education: BSc., Microbiology/Genetics; PhD., Biochemical Pharmacology; DSc
- Alma mater: University of Wales, Swansea; University of London

Kenneth D. Tew is a Scottish-American pharmacologist, academic and author. He is a professor in the Department of Cell & Molecular Pharmacology and the John C. West Endowed Chair in Cancer Research at the Medical University of South Carolina.

Tew's research primarily focuses on identifying cancer strategies with strong translational potential, particularly in the context of redox pathways, and resistance to various drugs to understand redox mechanisms and their connections to essential signaling pathways. He has authored, co-authored and edited research articles and books such as Preclinical and Clinical Modulation of Anticancer Drugs and Basic Science of Cancer. He is the recipient of the Outstanding Investigator Grant from the National Cancer Institute in 1993, the 2003 American Cancer Society Scientific Research Award and the 2010 Astellas USA Foundation Award from the American Society for Pharmacology and Experimental Therapeutics.

Tew is an Elected Fellow of the American Association for the Advancement of Science and the American Society for Pharmacology and Experimental Therapeutics. He is an Executive Editor of Biomedicine & Pharmacotherapy.

== Education and early career ==
Tew earned a Bachelor of Science in Microbiology/Genetics from the University of Wales, Swansea in 1973 and a PhD in Biochemical Pharmacology from the University of London, where he also received postdoctoral training in 1976. He served as the Head of the Basic Pharmacology Program at the Lombardi Cancer Center from 1982 to 1985, when he became a member and later Chairman of Pharmacology at the Fox Chase Cancer Center. Concurrently, he worked as an Adjunct Associate Professor of Pharmacology at the University of Pennsylvania until 1990 and was awarded his DSc from the University of London in 1995.

== Career ==
Tew was appointed the G. Willing Chair in Cancer Research at the Medical University of South Carolina from 1999 to 2004. He was the Director of the Developmental Cancer Therapeutics Program at Hollings Cancer Center from 2004 to 2019, and serves as a professor in the Department of Cell & Molecular Pharmacology at the Medical University of South Carolina.

Tew has been the John C. West Chair in Cancer Research at the Medical University of South Carolina since 2004.

Tew held the position of Associate Editor from 1993 to 2007 and later assumed the role of Senior Editor in the Experimental Therapeutics, Molecular Targets, and Chemical Biology Section from 2007 to 2018 for the journal Cancer Research. Concurrently, he held editorial positions including, Editor for Cellular Pharmacology, and Editor-in-Chief of Journal of Pharmacology and Experimental Therapeutics.

Tew has been the Editor (USA) of Biomedicine & Pharmacotherapy since 2002 and Serial Editor for Advances in Cancer Research since 2011. Additionally, he has held appointments at InVaMet Therapeutics and the Greehey Children's Cancer Research Institute Scientific External Advisory Board since 2019.

== Research ==
Through his research laboratory, the Tew laboratory, he has conducted research in redox pathways, with an emphasis on drug development, biomarker identification, and comprehending the effects of reactive oxygen and nitrogen species on cancer cells. He has focused on distinct post-translationally modified S-glutathionylated proteins affecting cell-signaling pathways, potentially acting as surrogate plasma biomarkers for drug response induced by oxidative and nitrosative stress. He holds patents for his work, contributing to the development of a glutathione S-transferase-activated prodrug and two small molecules in clinical development as potential myeloproliferative agents.

== Works ==
Tew has co-authored 2 books focusing on carcinogenesis and cancer treatment strategies. He co-wrote Preclinical and Clinical Modulation of Anticancer Drugs with Peter J. Houghton and Janet A. Houghton, providing an analysis of theoretical and practical approaches to the design and implementation of modulation principles. His collaborative work with Gary D. Kruh, Basic Science of Cancer, explored the advancements in cancer research, covering interrelated topics such as tumor suppressor genes, apoptosis, transcriptional regulation, pharmacology of anticancer drugs, cytogenetic techniques, oncogenes, and signal transductions.

Tew co-edited books from the series Advances in Cancer Research alongside Paul B. Fisher, where they provided reviews on diverse cancer research topics. In a review published in the Journal of Medicinal Chemistry, Thomas J. Bardos wrote about the series, "This rapidly growing series of volumes containing many excellent, highly informative, in-depth reviews on a variety of timely topics relating to cancer research has always been most representative in the areas of tumor biology and immunology."

=== Drug development ===
Tew's work on redox and pharmacogenetics focused on the discovery and development of drugs. Alongside colleagues, he introduced a novel zebrafish model with a glutathione S-transferase π1 (gstp1) knockout, revealing insights into redox homeostasis, reductive stress, and responses to drugs inducing endoplasmic reticulum stress and the unfolded protein response. His research has looked into the role of GTSP in cellular redox homeostasis and its over-expression in cancer drug resistance, particularly in the context of preclinical and clinical testing of the GSTP inhibitor TLK199 (Telintra) for treating myelodysplastic syndrome. He further revealed that the absence of microsomal glutathione transferase 1 (MGST1) impacts melanin biosynthesis and melanoma growth in mice and that, in numerous species, members of the GST family are involved in early hematopoiesis, and that the lack of GSTP in dendritic cells leads to increased proliferation, ROS levels and ERα levels, suggesting a role for GSTP in controlling ERα activity and dendritic cell function.

Additionally, Tew and colleagues investigated how S-glutathionylation of the protein BiP, mediated by GSTP, contributes to acquired resistance to the multiple myeloma treatment bortezomib (Btz) by impacting BiP's foldase and ATPase activities. In another collaborative study published in Scientific Reports, he found that S-glutathionylated serpins, specifically A1 and A3, are elevated in the blood of prostate cancer patients after radiation therapy, suggesting their potential as biomarkers for radiation exposure. He also explored melanoma cell lines resistant to reductive stress agents, showcasing changes in cell and mitochondrial morphology, metabolic preferences, and adaptive mechanisms in lethal reductive stress conditions.

=== Cancer treatment strategies ===
Tew has studied cancer strategies to devise new treatments. In a joint research, he highlighted the significance of microsomal glutathione transferase 1 (MGST1) in melanin biosynthetic pathways, revealing its role as a determinant of tumor progression, with MGST1 knockdown leading to depigmentation, increased oxidative stress, and hindered tumor growth. He also determined that inhibiting microsomal glutathione S-transferase 1 (MGST1) in melanoma enhances oxidative stress, increases sensitivity to anticancer drugs, and reduces metastasis, improving the effectiveness of therapies.

Tew examined ME-344, a second-generation isoflavone with anticancer properties in 2019, demonstrating its impact on redox homeostasis, mitochondrial function, and specific targeting of heme oxygenase 1 (HO-1) in lung cancer cells. In 2020, he determined that ME-344 targets VDAC1 and VDAC2 in lung cancer cells, leading to ROS generation, Bax translocation, cytochrome c release, and apoptosis, highlighting their potential as therapeutic targets. He also assessed how reactive oxygen species (ROS) play a dual role in cancer evolution, influencing both tumorigenesis and cell death, and highlighted tumor cell adaptations in metabolism and antioxidant defenses to manage ROS levels during different stages of cancer development.

== Awards and honors ==
- 1993 – Outstanding Investigator Grant, National Cancer Institute
- 2003 – Research Award, American Cancer Society Scientific
- 2010 – Astellas USA Foundation Award, American Society for Pharmacology and Experimental Therapeutics

== Bibliography ==
=== Selected books ===
- Mechanisms of Drug Resistance in Neoplastic Cells (1988) ISBN 9780127633626
- Preclinical and Clinical Modulation of Anticancer Drugs (1993) ISBN 9780849372919
- Basic Science of Cancer (2000) ISBN 9781468484397
- Advances in Cancer Research (2014) ISBN 9780124071902

=== Selected articles ===
- Adler, V., Yin, Z., Fuchs, S. Y., Benezra, M., Rosario, L., Tew, K. D., ... & Ronai, Z. E. (1999). Regulation of JNK signaling by GSTp. The EMBO journal, 18(5), 1321–1334.
- Townsend, D. M., Tew, K. D., & Tapiero, H. (2003). The importance of glutathione in human disease. Biomedicine & pharmacotherapy, 57(3-4), 145–155.
- Townsend, D. M., & Tew, K. D. (2003). The role of glutathione-S-transferase in anti-cancer drug resistance. Oncogene, 22(47), 7369–7375.
- Tapiero, H., & Tew, K. D. (2003). Trace elements in human physiology and pathology: zinc and metallothioneins. Biomedicine & Pharmacotherapy, 57(9), 399–411.
- Hayes, J. D., Dinkova-Kostova, A. T., & Tew, K. D. (2020). Oxidative stress in cancer. Cancer cell, 38(2), 167–197.
- Tew, K.D. Alkylating Agents. In: Principles & Practice of Oncology. Eds. DeVita, Hellman & Rosenberg. pp246–256, 2018.
- Tew, K.D. Protein S-Glutathionylation & Glutathione S-transferase P. In: Glutathione. Editor: Leopold Flohé. CRC Press. Chapter 12, 201–214, 2018.
