= Roja Rahimi =

Iranian pharmacologist

- Born: Shiraz, Iran
- Education: Tehran University of Medical Sciences; Shiraz University of Medical Sciences
- Scientific career
- Workplaces: University of Tehran

Roja Rahimi is an Iranian pharmacologist who is a professor of traditional pharmacy at the University of Tehran. Her research has advanced understanding of herbal medicines. She was awarded the 2025 Bionorica Phytoneering Award.

== Early life and education ==
Rahimi was born in Shiraz. Her father was a civil engineer and her mother was a teacher. She studied pharmacy at Shiraz University of Medical Sciences. Rahimi earned her doctorate in traditional pharmacy at the Tehran University of Medical Sciences. She was a postdoctoral researcher in Iran, where she studied the pharmacological properties of medicinal plants used in Iranian traditional medicine.

== Research and career ==
Rahimi is a professor at University of Tehran. She is dean of the International College of the Tehran University of Medical Sciences.

Rahimi was awarded the Bionorica Phytoneering Award 2025. She has been recognised at the Razi Medical Sciences Festival and the Avicenna Festival.

== Selected publications ==
- Roja Rahimi; Shekoufeh Nikfar; Bagher Larijani; Mohammad Abdollahi (1 August 2005). "A review on the role of antioxidants in the management of diabetes and its complications". Biomedicine & Pharmacotherapy. 59 (7): 365–373. doi:10.1016/j.biopha.2005.07.002. ISSN 0753-3322. PMID 16081237. Wikidata Q36218881.
- Niloofar Kahkeshani; Fatemeh Farzaei; Maryam Fotouhi; et al. (1 March 2019). "Pharmacological effects of gallic acid in health and diseases: A mechanistic review". Iranian Journal of Basic Medical Sciences. 22 (3): 225–237. doi:10.22038/ijbms.2019.32806.7897. ISSN 2008-3866. PMC 6528712. PMID 31156781. Wikidata Q92479806.
- Mohammad Hosein Farzaei; Mahdi Zobeiri; Fatemeh Parvizi; et al. (1 July 2018). "Curcumin in Liver Diseases: A Systematic Review of the Cellular Mechanisms of Oxidative Stress and Clinical Perspective". Nutrients. 10 (7): 855. doi:10.3390/nu10070855. ISSN 2072-6643. PMC 6073929. PMID 29966389. Wikidata Q60176895.
