= M. Wesley Swearingen =

FBI agent and author

Mont Wesley Swearingen (May 20, 1927 Steubenville, Ohio - November 13, 2019 Hemet, California) was an FBI Special Agent from 1951 to 1977. He wrote two books drawn from his experience: FBI Secrets (1995), and To Kill a President(2008), an examination of the John F. Kennedy assassination.

== Biography ==
Born in Steubenville, Ohio, Swearingen served in the United States Navy from 1945 to 1946. After the war, he used the GI Bill to study at Ohio State University, where he graduated.

He joined the FBI and began his career conducting black bag jobs on Communists in Chicago.

In Kentucky and New York City, he spent years doing serious criminal investigations, which had been his goal in joining the FBI. But Director J. Edgar Hoover had become fixated on the threat in the 1950s and 1960s that he believed was posed by civil rights groups: first because of links to American communists. posed by such groups as the Black Panther Party. and the Weathermen.

Assigned to the Los Angeles FBI field office, Swearingen burglarized the Tucson Five and their lawyers during the FBI's efforts to prosecute them, but no incriminating evidence was found. The Tucson Five were exonerated.

After 25 years with the FBI, Swearingen retired in 1977.

Swearingen was interviewed in the documentary films All Power to the People! (1997), which explored issues related to the Black Panthers, and The U.S. vs. John Lennon.

He died in Hemet, California on November 13, 2019.

== Publications ==
- FBI Secrets: An Agent’s Exposé. Boston: South End Press, 1995. ISBN 0896085015 / ISBN 978-0896085015.
- To Kill a President: Finally—an Ex-FBI Agent Rips Aside the Veil of Secrecy that Killed JFK. BookSurge Publishing, 2008. ISBN 1419693824 / ISBN 978-1419693823.(self-published)
