= MedStar Georgetown University Hospital =

- MedStar Health

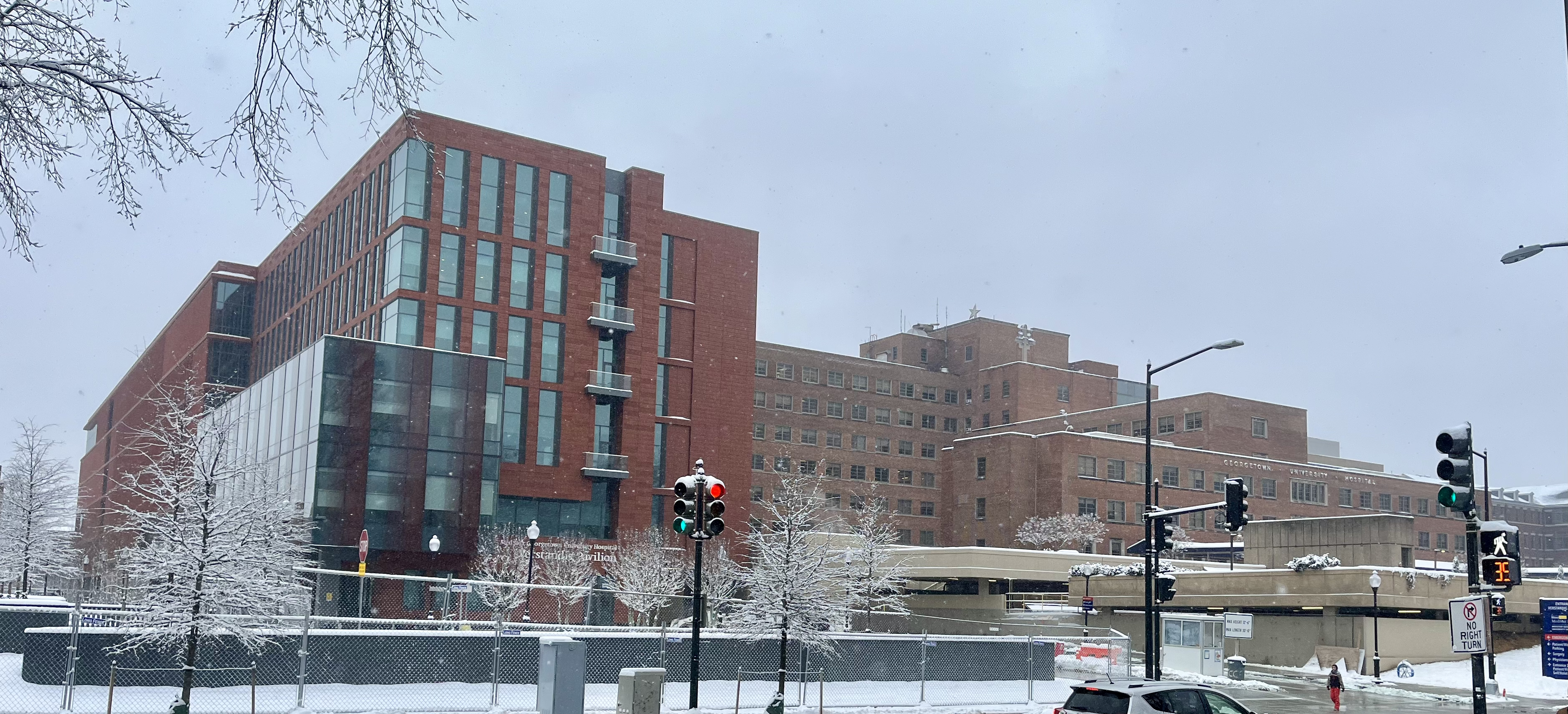
- MedStar Georgetown University Hospital in January 2024

Geography
- Location: 3800 Reservoir Road NW, Washington, D.C., United States
- Coordinates: 38°54′42″N 77°4′32″W

Organization
- Care system: Private
- Type: Academic teaching hospital
- Religious affiliation: Catholic (Jesuit)
- Affiliated university: Georgetown University School of Medicine
- Network: MedStar Health

Services
- Emergency department: Yes
- Beds: 609

Helipads
- Helipad: FAA LID: DC09
| Number | Length | | Surface |
| Number | ft | m | Surface |
|---|---|---|---|
| H1 | 100 | 30 | Concrete/turf |

History
- Founded: 1898

Links
- Website: www.medstargeorgetown.org
- Lists: Hospitals in Washington, D.C.

MedStar Georgetown University Hospital is one of the Washington, D.C. area's oldest academic teaching hospitals. It is a not-for-profit, acute care teaching and research facility located in the Georgetown neighborhood of the Northwest Quadrant of Washington, D.C.

MedStar Georgetown is co-located with the Georgetown University Medical Center and is affiliated with the Georgetown University School of Medicine. The hospital is home to the Georgetown Lombardi Comprehensive Cancer Center and centers of excellence in gastroenterology, neurology, neurosurgery, organ transplantation, psychiatry, and vascular surgery. Originally named Georgetown University Hospital, it became part of the MedStar Health network in 2000.

The hospital has 609 licensed beds and employs over 4,000 personnel.

In 2023, the hospital opened a new $750 million pavilion, containing a new emergency department, rooftop helipad, 31 advanced operating rooms, and over 150 private patient rooms.

== History ==
=== 19th century ===
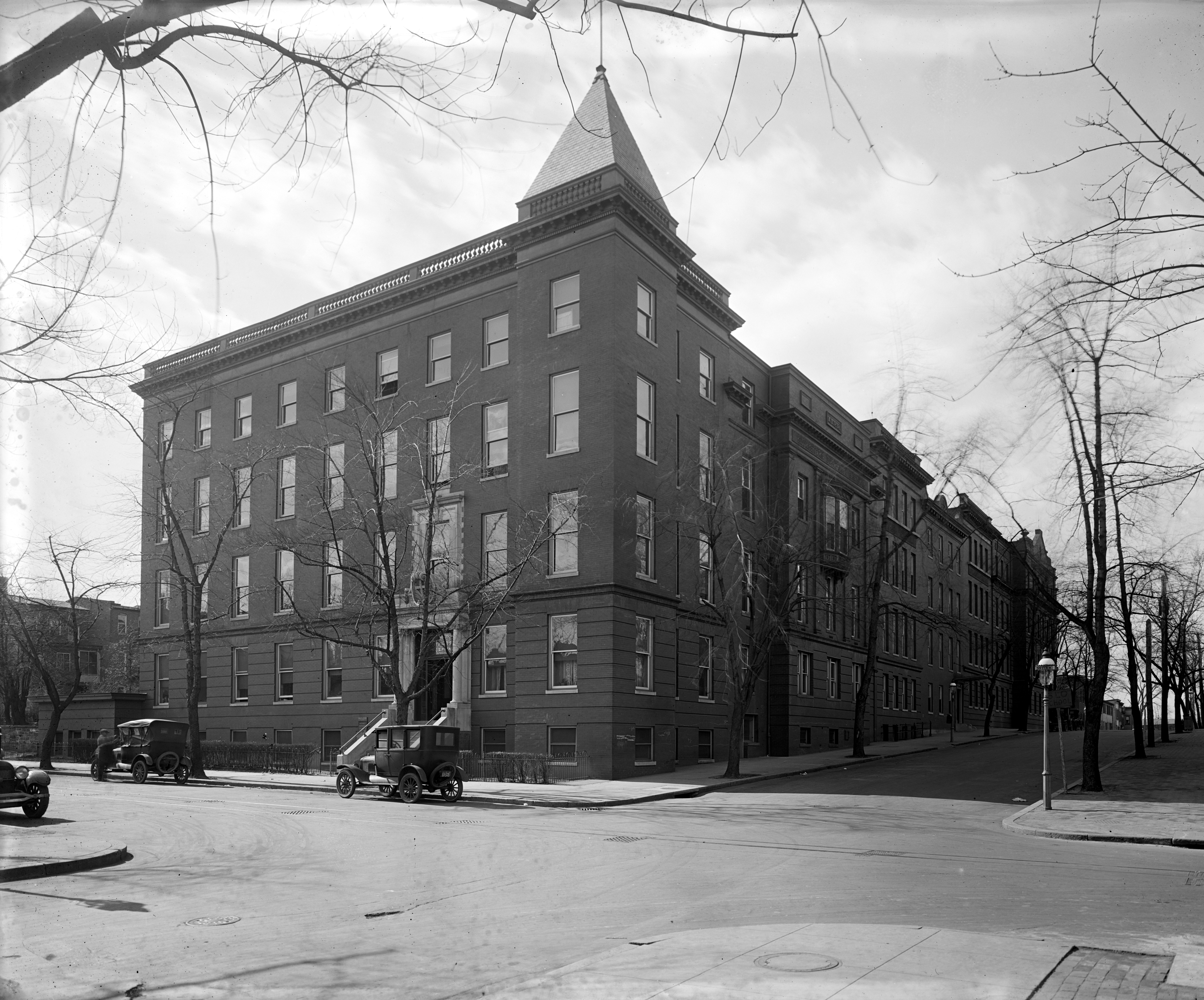
The original Georgetown University Hospital building, c. 1910s

Georgetown University Hospital was founded in 1898 as part of Georgetown University. The facility opened with 33 beds and was staffed by the Sisters of St. Francis of Philadelphia.

=== 20th century ===
The hospital moved to its current location at 3800 Reservoir Road NW in Washington, D.C. in 1930. In 1946, the Sisters of Charity of Nazareth took over operation of the hospital.

In 1947, the main hospital was built and was the first building erected in what is now the MedStar Georgetown University Hospital complex.

In 1988, the hospital was involved in the important United States Supreme Court case Bowen v. Georgetown University Hospital, in which the U.S. Supreme Court held that agencies may not promulgate retroactive rules unless expressly authorized by Congress.

=== 21st century ===
The hospital has grown to include a community physician practice, the Georgetown Lombardi Comprehensive Cancer Center, and scores of clinical departments and divisions. Through its 100-year relationship with Georgetown University, the hospital collaborates in training students from both the School of Medicine, including nearly 500 residents and fellows annually, and the School of Nursing and Health Studies. MedStar Georgetown University Hospital works closely with the university's research enterprise to help bring innovative therapies from the scientific laboratory to the patient bedside. The hospital, now more than 80 percent renovated, houses multiple patient units, hospital administration offices, and hospital support services.

In July 2000, Georgetown University entered into a partnership with Medstar Health, a not-for-profit organization of two other Washington, D.C. hospitals and five Baltimore-based hospitals, including another Catholic hospital. In October 2000, M. Joy Drass, MD, an alumna of Georgetown University School of Medicine, was appointed MedStar Georgetown University Hospital's president.

With primary care providers at nine sites in Washington, D.C., Maryland, and Virginia, MedStar Georgetown University Hospital's clinical services represent one of the largest, most geographically diverse and fully integrated healthcare delivery networks in the area.

In June 2017, the city zoning commission approved the construction of a new medical and surgical pavilion. Construction on the new pavilion began in early 2018. In November 2021, Grant Verstandig, an entrepreneur and investor, donated $50 million to the hospital for the construction of the new pavilion. The Verstandig Pavilion opened on December 10, 2023. Construction cost approximately $750 million. The building comprises approximately 477,000 square feet (44,300 m^{2}), contains 31 operating rooms with intraoperative MRIs, a new emergency department containing 32 examination rooms, 156 private patient rooms, and a new rooftop helipad. A three-story parking garage is beneath the building, and 6 acres (2.4 ha) of newly created green space surround the building.

== Operations ==
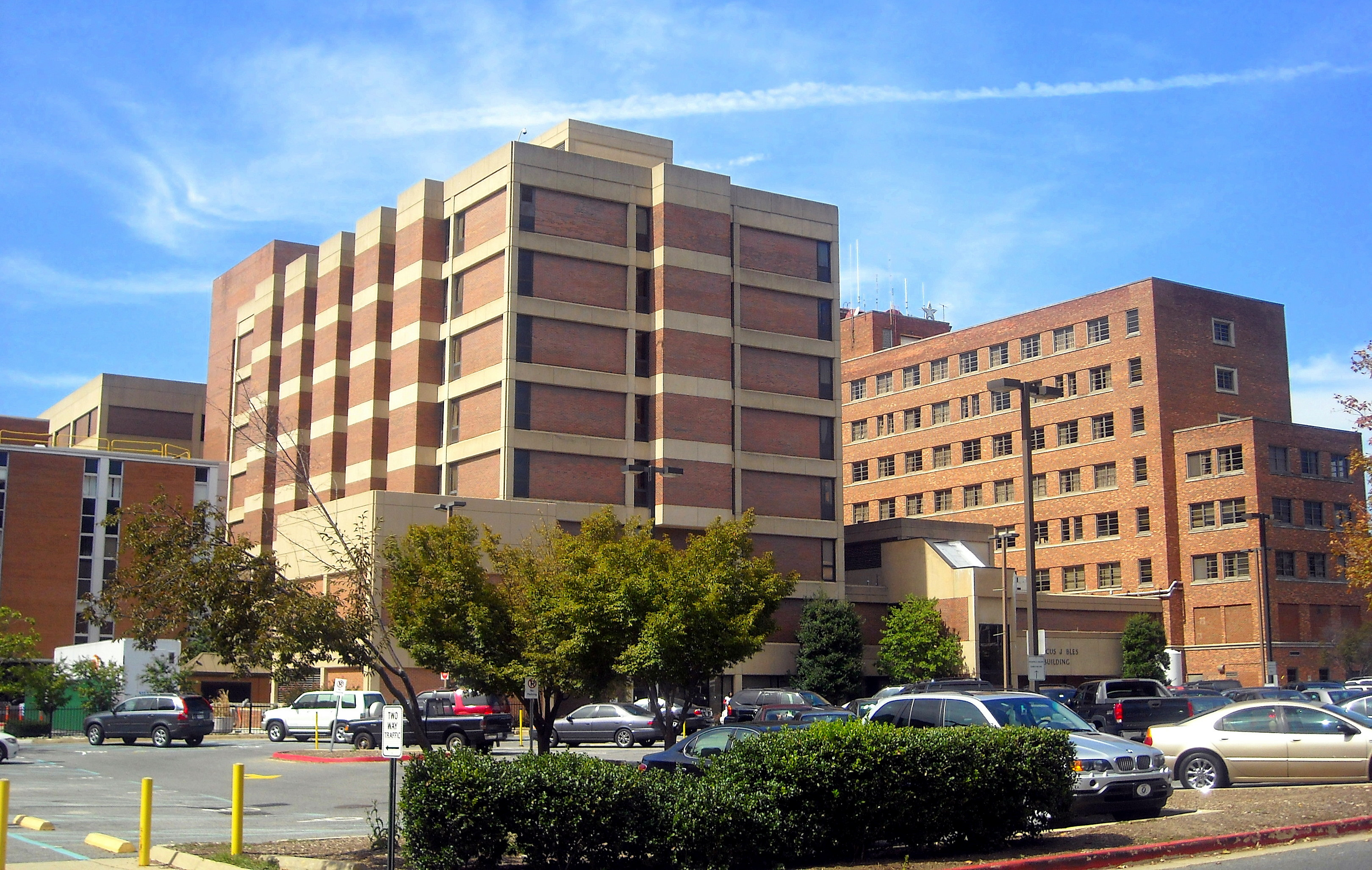
The Pasquerilla Healthcare Center, the Gorman Building, and the Marcus Bles Building, prior to construction of the Verstandig Pavilion

The research and education programs affiliated with MedStar Georgetown University Hospital, including its residencies, fellowships, and clinical trials, continue to be administered by Georgetown University Medical Center.

Specialty areas in which the hospital has been ranked in recent years include cancer, digestive disorders, ear, nose and throat, geriatrics, gynaecology, heart disease, hormonal disorders, gastroenterology, kidney disease, neurology, neurosurgery, orthopedics, psychiatry, respiratory disorders, rheumatology, and urology.

The Georgetown Lombardi Comprehensive Cancer Center is the only facility in the Washington metropolitan area to be designated by the National Cancer Institute (NCI) as a Comprehensive Care Center. MedStar Georgetown's Transplant Institute is ranked among the best in the Mid-Atlantic region by the Scientific Registry of Transplant Recipients for liver transplantation outcomes and is one of few centers in the country to provide living-donor liver transplants. Georgetown Neurosciences is first on the U.S. East Coast and the sixth in the nation to offer the Cyberknife, a relatively new device in stereotactic radiosurgery to treat tumors and lesions of the brain, neck, and spine.

MedStar Georgetown is home to the Lombardi Comprehensive Cancer Center, the only facility in the Washington metropolitan area designated by the National Cancer Institute (NCI) as a Comprehensive Cancer Center.

In July 2000, Georgetown University Hospital became part of MedStar Health, a non–profit network of seven regional hospitals, which together see more than 7000 new cancer patients annually.

In 2007, over 200 patients participated in therapeutic trials at the Lombardi Cancer Center.

== Rankings and recognition ==
In 2001, U.S. News & World Report's "Best Hospitals" issue ranked the hospital in 13 specialties, more categories than any other Washington metropolitan area hospital.

In 2004, the hospital was awarded Magnet Status by the American Nurses Credentialing Center (ANCC). MedStar Georgetown was the first, and remains the only, hospital in Washington, D.C. to be awarded this distinction.

== Hospital rating data ==
The Healthgrades website contains the clinical quality data for Medstar Georgetown University Hospital, as of 2018. For this rating section clinical quality rating data, patient safety ratings and patient experience ratings are presented.

For inpatient conditions and procedures, there are three possible ratings: worse than expected, as expected, better than expected. For this hospital the data for this category is:

- Worse than expected – 6
- As expected – 17
- Better than expected – 1

For patient safety ratings the same three possible ratings are used. For this hospital they are"

- Worse than expected – 4
- As expected – 8
- Better than expected – 1

Percentage of patients rating this hospital as a 9 or 10 – 70% Percentage of patients who on average rank hospitals as a 9 or 10 – 69%

== Notable births, hospitalizations, and deaths ==
=== Births ===
- Douglas Harriman Kennedy, March 24, 1967
- John F. Kennedy Jr., November 25, 1960
- Robert F. Kennedy Jr., January 17, 1954
- Rory Kennedy, December 12, 1968
- Mark Kennedy Shriver, February 17, 1964
- Rondy Wooten, January 8, 1966

=== Hospitalizations ===
- Bill Clinton, 2024
- Eddie Foster, 1913
- Frank Gill, 1982
- Rudy Giuliani, 2020
- Ralph McGehee, 1972

=== Deaths ===
- Juan Pablo Pérez Alfonzo, September 3, 1979
- Henry F. Ashurst, May 31, 1962
- Mustafa Barzani, March 1, 1979
- Ben H. Brown Jr., May 25, 1989
- Thomas McPherson Brown, April 17, 1989
- Katharine Byron, December 28, 1976
- John Moors Cabot, February 24, 1981
- Walter Compton, December 9, 1959
- Douglas DeGood, December 1, 2019
- Charles Burke Elbrick, April 12, 1983
- John H. Fanning, July 21, 1990
- James C. Fletcher, December 22, 1991
- Don Flickinger, February 23, 1997
- J. Eugene Gallery, July 28, 1960
- William C. Gloth, December 3, 1944
- Guy L. Goodwin, December 10, 2007
- Robert Newton Harper, September 23, 1940
- Robert O. Harris, October 1, 2007
- Robert W. Hasbrouck, August 19, 1985
- Joseph J. Himmel, November 3, 1924
- John Jay Hopkins, May 3, 1957
- Peter Leo Ireton, April 27, 1958
- Henry Arnold Karo, May 23, 1986
- Jan Karski, July 13, 2000
- Richard T. Kennedy, January 12, 1998
- Ray Krouse, April 9, 1966
- Evelyn Lincoln, May 11, 1995
- Vince Lombardi, September 3, 1970
- Stasys Lozoraitis Jr., June 13, 1994
- Frank Lyon, November 29, 1955
- Lester Machta, August 31, 2001
- Stephen May, March 31, 2016
- Brien McMahon, July 28, 1952
- Lillian B. Miller, November 27, 1997
- J. Murray Mitchell, October 5, 1990
- Raymond Muir, June 23, 1954
- John O'Donnell, December 17, 1961
- Arthur A. O'Leary, February 8, 1962
- Glenn E. Plumb, August 1, 1922
- David H. Popper, July 24, 2008
- Carroll Quigley, January 3, 1977
- Bill Reinhart, February 14, 1971
- James J. Reynolds, October 9, 1986
- Hugh Seton-Watson, December 19, 1984
- Stephen N. Shulman, January 22, 2011
- Ormond Simkins, December 4, 1921
- Walter T. Skallerup Jr., July 29, 1987
- Tony Snow, July 12, 2008
- Harold P. Stern, April 3, 1977
- Jack Swigert, December 27, 1982
- John Sylvester, July 26, 1990
- Bertram D. Tallamy, September 14, 1989
- Robert H. Thayer, January 26, 1984
- Caroline van Hook Bean, December 24, 1980
- Ellen Hardin Walworth, June 23, 1915
- Paul W. Ward, November 24, 1976
- Earl Warren, July 9, 1974
- James E. Webb, March 27, 1992
- Edward Bennett Williams, August 13, 1988
- Frank J. Wilson, June 22, 1970
- Raymond Workman, August 21, 1966
- Lawrence A. Wright, March 19, 2000
- Charles Yost, May 21, 1981
