= Dennis H. Wright =

British pathologist

Dennis Howard Wright (11 August 1931 – 8 April 2020) was a British medical doctor and professor of pathology with an international reputation in haematopathology.

== Biography ==
Wright grew up in the county of Norfolk and attended the City of Norwich School with a Norfolk county scholarship. He graduated from the University of Bristol in 1953 with a B.Sc. in physiology and in 1956 with an MB ChB (Hons). After receiving his degree, he fulfilled his national service requirement by serving as a pathologist in Kampala, Uganda. There he worked as a lecturer, senior lecturer, and then reader in pathology at Makerere University's medical school, where he spent eight years. During the late 1950s and early 1960s, he worked with Dr. Denis Burkitt in describing the pathology of Burkitt lymphoma. Wright became a leading expert on lymphomas. In 1964 he graduated from the University of Bristol with a higher doctorate MD. His M.D. thesis is entitled Malignant Lymphomas in Uganda. In 1965 he qualified as MRCPath. In 1968 he returned from Uganda to England to become a reader in pathology at Birmingham University. In 1972 he was appointed the Foundation Professor of Pathology at the University of Southampton and retired there in 1996 as professor emeritus.

In the 1970s, Wright pioneered the use of immunofluorescence to investigate the cellular pathogenesis of Hodgkin lymphoma. He was the first to suggest that Reed–Sternberg cells are derived from B-cells — a controversial proposal that was not confirmed until several decades later. In the 1980s and 1990s, he and his coworkers were among the first to describe T-cell lymphomas associated with enteropathy and to describe lymphomas of mucosa-associated lymphoid tissue. His pioneering research transformed lymphoma diagnose by the use of immunoperoxidase staining of paraffin sections. Later, he and his coworkers published a number of papers involving molecular analysis of lymphomas.

As a professor, Wright was committed not only to his research but also to general surgical and autopsy pathology. From 1983 to 1994 he was the editor-in-chief of The Journal of Pathology from 1983 to 1994. He was also served on the editorial board of Biomedicine. He served as the president of the European Haematopathology Society.

He received in 1973 the Paul Ehrlich and Ludwig Darmstaedter Prize for his research on the pathology of Burkitt lymphoma. He was elected in 1977 a Fellow of the Royal College of Pathologists (FRCPath). His final publication, which was the 3rd edition of Diagnostic Lymph Node Pathology (2016), received the accolade of 'Highly Commended' in the British Medical Association's 2017 book awards.

Upon his death, Dennis H. Wright was survived by his widow, Elizabeth, and their two children, as well as six children from his first marriage, and ten grandchildren. Three of his eight children became medical doctors.

== Selected publications ==
=== Articles ===
- Wright, D. H. (1975). The Dead End of Medicine?: An Inaugural Lecture Delivered on 22 May, 1975. University of Southampton. ISBN 0-85432-148-9; 13 pages
- Isaacson, Peter; Wright, Dennis H. (1978). "Malignant histiocytosis of the intestine". Human Pathology. 9 (6): 661–677. doi:10.1016/S0046-8177(78)80049-5. PMID 730148.
- Isaacson, Peter; Wright, Dennis H.; Judd, Mary A.; Mepham, Brian L. (1979). "Primary gastrointestinal lymphomas:A classification of 66 cases". Cancer. 43 (5): 1805–1819. doi:10.1002/1097-0142(197905)43:5<1805::AID-CNCR2820430534>3.0.CO;2-6. PMID 376099. S2CID 42252144.
- Isaacson, Peter; Wright, Dennis H. (1983). "Malignant lymphoma of mucosa-associated lymphoid tissue. A distinctive type of B-cell lymphoma". Cancer. 52 (8): 1410–1416. doi:10.1002/1097-0142(19831015)52:8<1410::AID-CNCR2820520813>3.0.CO;2-3. PMID 6193858. S2CID 10324919.
- Herbert, Amanda; Wright, Dennis H.; Isaacson, Peter G.; Smith, John L. (1984). "Primary malignant lymphoma of the lung: Histopathologic and immunologic evaluation of nine cases". Human Pathology. 15 (5): 415–422. doi:10.1016/S0046-8177(84)80074-X. PMID 6373559.
- Isaacson, Peter; Wright, Dennis H. (1984). "Extranodal malignant lymphoma arising from mucosa-associated lymphoid tissue". Cancer. 53 (11): 2515–2524. doi:10.1002/1097-0142(19840601)53:11<2515::AID-CNCR2820531125>3.0.CO;2-C. PMID 6424928. S2CID 23297912.
- Flavell, D. J.; Jones, D. B.; Wright, D. H. (1987). "Identification of tissue histiocytes on paraffin sections by a new monoclonal antibody". Journal of Histochemistry & Cytochemistry. 35 (11): 1217–1226. doi:10.1177/35.11.3309045. PMID 3309045. S2CID 32783494.
- Niedobitek, Gerald; Agathanggelou, Angelo; Herbst, Hermann; Whitehead, Lucie; Wright, Dennis H.; Young, Lawrence S. (1997). "Epstein-Barr Virus (Ebv) Infection in Infectious Mononucleosis: Virus Latency, Replication and Phenotype of Ebv-Infected Cells". The Journal of Pathology. 182 (2): 151–159. doi:10.1002/(SICI)1096-9896(199706)182:2<151::AID-PATH824>3.0.CO;2-3. PMID 9274524. S2CID 21216533.
- Gale, Joanna; Simmonds, Peter D.; Mead, Graham M.; Sweetenham, John W.; Wright, Dennis H. (2000). "Enteropathy-Type Intestinal T-Cell Lymphoma: Clinical Features and Treatment of 31 Patients in a Single Center". Journal of Clinical Oncology. 18 (4): 795–803. doi:10.1200/jco.2000.18.4.795. PMID 10673521.

=== Books ===
- Burkitt, Denis P.; Wright, Dennis H. (1970). Burkitt's Lymphoma. Edinburgh: Livingstone. ISBN 0-443-00700-4. LCCN 72021505; xi+251 pages; foreword by Sir Harold Himsworth
- Wright, Dennis H.; Isaacson, Peter G. (17 December 2013). Biopsy Pathology of the Lymphoreticular System. ISBN 978-1-4899-3396-6; 1st edition 1983
- Jones, D. B.; Wright, D. H., eds. (6 December 2012). Lymphoproliferative Diseases. ISBN 978-94-009-0739-3; 1st edition 1990
- Wilkins, Bridget S.; Wright, Dennis H. (24 February 2000). Illustrated Pathology of the Spleen. Cambridge University Press. ISBN 978-0-521-62227-1.
- Wright, Dennis H.; Addis, Bruce J.; Leong, Anthony S.-Y. (2006). Diagnostic lymph node pathology. ISBN 978-1-4441-1473-7.
  - 2nd edition. London: Hodder Arnold. 2011. ISBN 978-1-4441-4677-6.
  - Ashton-Key, Margaret; Wright, Penny; Wright, Dennis (8 October 2018). Diagnostic Lymph Node Pathology (3rd ed.). CRC Press. ISBN 978-1-4987-3270-3.
