= Thomas McPherson =

Thomas McPherson or Tom McPherson may refer to:

People

== Politicians ==
- Tom McPherson (born 1935), American politician; mayor of Cooper City, Florida
- Thomas McPherson, Mayor of Melbourne Australia 1870–1871; see List of mayors and lord mayors of Melbourne

== Others ==
- Thomas McPherson, alias used by the founder of the James Kirk diploma mills
- Thomas Shanks McPherson, philanthropist and namesake for the McPherson Playhouse
- Tom McPherson, Welsh rugby player with Ebbw Vale RFC
- Tommy McPherson II, director of the Mobile Museum of Art

Fiction

- Tommy McPherson, character in Alien Abduction: Incident in Lake County

== See also ==
- Thomas McPherson Brown
- Thomas Macpherson (disambiguation)
