= All Power to the People =

- Poster of film
- Directed by: Lee Lew-Lee
- Produced by: Lee Lew-Lee
- Cinematography: Lee Lew-Lee
- Edited by: Ruby L.B. Yang
- Production companies: Electronic News Group; Zweites Deutsches Fernsehen
- Release date: 1996
- Country: United States
- Language: English

All Power to the People: The Black Panther Party and Beyond is a 1996 documentary directed by Lee Lew-Lee. The film chronicles the history of the Black Panther Party, leadership, and members. The film also briefly chronicles the history of the American Indian Movement and Black Liberation Army. The film covers assassinations and methods used to divide, destroy, and imprison key figures within the party. It is composed primarily of archival footage and interviews of former organization members and government agents. The documentary was broadcast in 24 countries on 12 networks in the United States, Canada, Europe, Asia and Australia between 1997 and 2000.

== Interviewees ==
=== Members of Black Power organizations ===
- Mumia Abu-Jamal - member of the Black Panther Party, 1969–1971
- Dhoruba al-Mujahid bin Wahad - member of the Black Panther Party, 1968–1971
- Sofiya Alston Bukhari - member of the Black Panther Party, 1969–1971 and Black Liberation Army, 1972–1974
- Kathleen Cleaver - central committee member of the Black Panther Party, 1967–1971
- Emory Douglas - central committee member of the Black Panther Party, 1967–1972
- George Edwards - member of the Black Panther Party, 1969–1974
- Herman Ferguson - member of Republic of New Afrika
- Ronald Freeman - member of the Black Panther Party, 1968–1971
- Ali Bey Hassan - member of the Black Panther Party, 1968–1971 and Black Liberation Army, 1971–1973
- Kim Holder - member of the Black Panther Party, 1969–1971
- Mark Holder - member of the Black Panther Party, 1969–1971 and Black Liberation Army, 1971–1972
- Michael McCarty - member of the Black Panther Party, 1968–1971 and acupuncture doctor
- Thomas McCreary - member of the Black Panther Party, 1968–1971
- Somaya Moore - member of the Black Panther Party, 1969–1971
- Bobby Seale - co-founder and chairman of the Black Panther Party, 1966–1974
- Mutulu Shakur - member of the Black Liberation Army and acupuncture doctor
- Ron Wilkins - vice chairman of the Student Nonviolent Coordinating Committee, 1968–1969

=== Government agents ===
- Philip Agee - Central Intelligence Agency officer, 1958–1969
- Ramsey Clark - US Attorney General, 1965–1968
- M. Wesley Swearingen - special agent of the Federal Bureau of Investigation, 1950–1977
- William Turner - special agent of the Federal Bureau of Investigation, 1950–1961

=== Others ===
- Ward Churchill - member of the American Indian Movement
- Alex Constantine - private researcher
- Donald Freed - private researcher
- John Judge - private investigator of assassinations
- Yuri Kochiyama - Asian-American activist, friend of Malcolm X
- Sarah McClendon - member of the White House press corps, 1931–1996
- Jim McCluskey - founder of Centurion Ministries
- Charles Mingus III - artist
- Nobuko Miyamoto - Japanese-American activist
- Gordon Parks - photo journalist of Life magazine, 1949–1971
- Leonard Peltier - member of the American Indian Movement
- Jim Vander Wal - private researcher

== Awards ==
- Best Historical Documentary, National Black Programming Consortium (ITVS/PBS) 1998
- Black Filmworks Award, Black Filmmakers Hall of Fame 1998
- Best Director, Finalist, Gordon Parks Award (MTV/ IFP) 1998
- Critic's Award, Southern Film Festival Memphis Black Writer's Conference 1999
- Paul Robeson Award for Excellence in Independent Filmmaking, The Newark Film Festival (Mobil Oil / Newark Museum) 1997
- Robert Townsend Tenacity Award, Roy W. Dean Awards, 1997
- Paul Robeson Grant Award, Paul Robeson Fund for Independent Media, 1997
- The Windy City International Documentary Festival (Columbia College, Chicago), 1997
- The Grand Prize, Roy W. Dean Awards, 1995

== See also ==
- COINTELPRO
