= Francis Burkitt =

Francis Burkitt may refer to:

- Francis Crawford Burkitt, English theologian
- Francis Hassard Burkitt, Irish Anglican priest
