= Lester Machta =

American meteorologist (1919–2001)

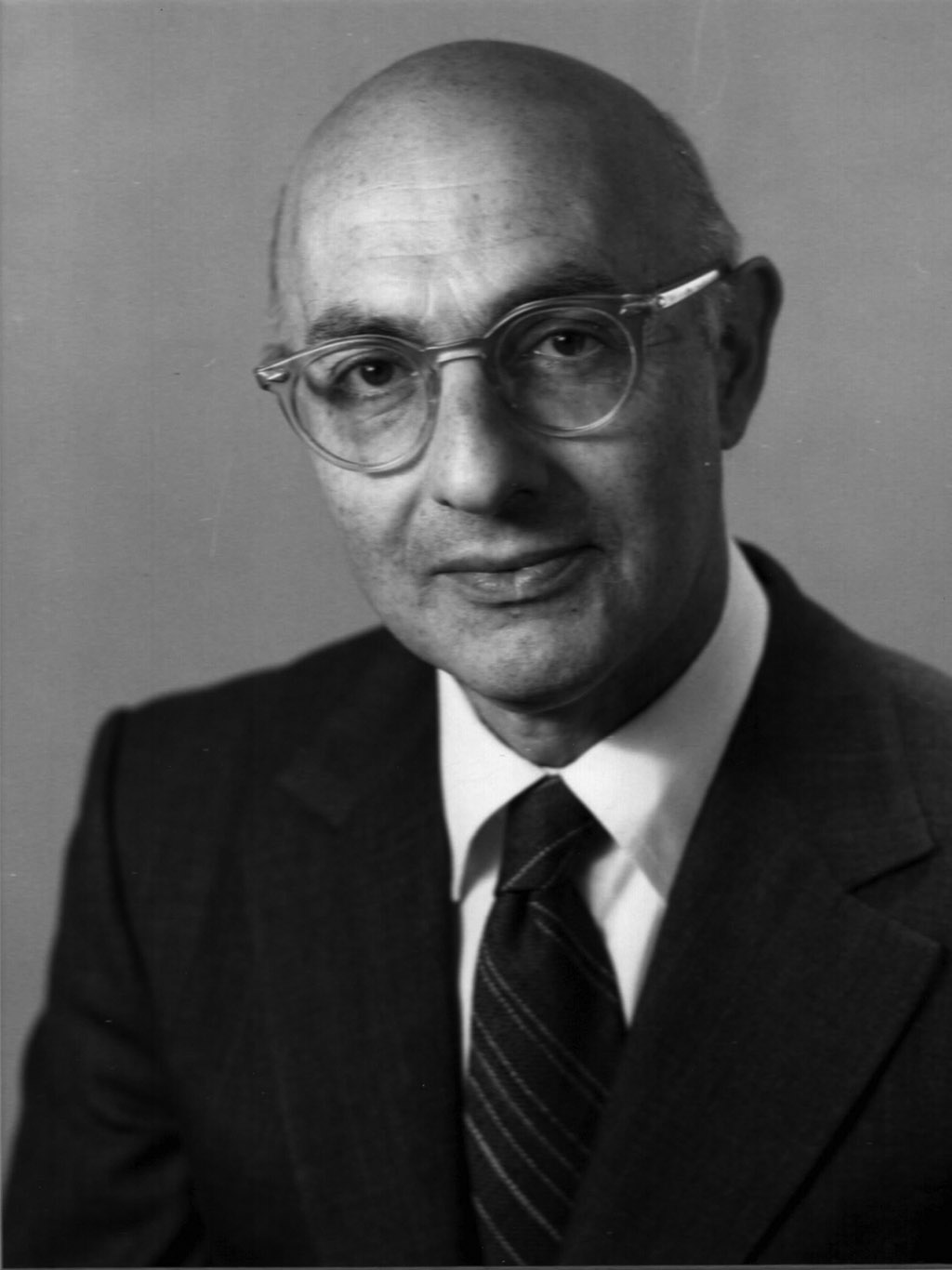
- Lester Machta
- Born: February 17, 1919; Brooklyn, New York City, New York
- Died: August 31, 2001 (aged 82); Georgetown, Washington, D.C.
- Citizenship: United States of America
- Education: City College of New York; Brooklyn College; New York University; Massachusetts Institute of Technology
- Known for: nuclear fallout air pollution global warming
- Scientific career
- Fields: meteorology
- Workplaces: National Oceanic and Atmospheric Administration - Air Resources Laboratory

Lester Machta (February 17, 1919 – August 31, 2001) was an American meteorologist, the first director of the Air Resources Laboratory (ARL) of the National Oceanic and Atmospheric Administration.

== Life ==
Lester Machta was born in Brooklyn, New York, the son of Jewish immigrants from Russia. He attended City College and Brooklyn College, graduating in 1939. After a year of graduate study Machta entered military service as a meteorology instructor training pilots for the Army and Army Air Corps. He received an M.A. in meteorology from New York University in 1946 and a Sc.D. in meteorology from M.I.T. in 1948. He married Phyllis Margaretten in 1948; they had two children.

== Career ==
In 1948 Harry Wexler hired Machta to join the United States Weather Bureau as Chief of the Special Projects Section, which later became the Air Resources Laboratory. The Special Projects Section was created to study the atmospheric effects of nuclear weapons tests. Even before the Soviet Union developed its first atomic bomb, the US made preparations to detect and analyze nuclear testing, and when the first Soviet bomb was detonated in 1949 there was a concerted effort to determine its yield, location, and the subsequent transport of radioactive materials. Under Machta’s direction, the Special Projects Section assisted in weapons testing at the Nevada and Bikini test sites by providing predictions of near-term downwind nuclear fallout from the explosions.

Machta also studied the long-term fallout resulting from radioactive materials injected into the stratosphere by nuclear testing. He realized that radioactive materials in the atmosphere could also serve as useful tracers to understand atmospheric circulation. The Atomic Energy Commission initially minimized the risk from long-term fallout using a simple model developed by Willard Libby that presumed fallout would be well-mixed in the stratosphere, would reach the ground over a period of 10 years, and be uniformly distributed over the surface of the Earth. Machta used the more realistic Brewer-Dobson model of atmospheric circulation, showing that radioactive fallout would reach the ground sooner and be concentrated in the populated mid-latitudes, and thus produce much greater health risks. He presented these conclusions in Congressional testimony, contributing significantly to the scientific rationale for ending above-ground nuclear testing. Machta participated in the 1958 Experts’ Conference in Geneva that lead to the 1963 Partial Nuclear Test Ban Treaty.

Machta's concerns extended to other pollutants in the atmosphere including acid rain, ozone, and most significantly, greenhouse gases. He played a central role in establishing and, from 1971 to 1989, supervising the Geophysical Monitoring for Climatic Change program (now in the NOAA Climate Monitoring and Diagnostics Laboratory). The GMCC program incorporated the already existing Mauna Loa and South Pole Observatories operated by Charles David Keeling, whose long-term measurements of atmospheric carbon dioxide would eventually be recognized as essential for the study of global warming

Machta meanwhile became an expert on stratospheric ozone, publishing numerous scientific papers on the subject while overseeing the United States network of Dobson ozone spectrophotometers. He served as a member of the International Ozone Commission from 1964 to 1971. At a conference in 1972, Machta alerted F. Sherwood Rowland to James Lovelock’s measurements showing that chlorofluorocarbons (CFCs) are present in the stratosphere, sparking the research that led to the discovery that CFCs deplete the ozone layer.

Machta also worked on the transport of acid rain and other pollution through the atmosphere. He was the U.S. co-chair of the International Air Quality Advisory Board of the International Joint Commission which studies air pollution that affects both the United States and Canada.

== Later life ==
After his official retirement as its director in 1989, Machta continued to do research at the Air Resources Laboratory until shortly before his death from leukemia on August 31, 2001, at the Georgetown University Hospital.

== Honors ==
- Department of Commerce Medal for Exceptional Service (1957,1985)
- Fellow of the American Association for the Advancement of Science (1980)
- Fellow of the American Geophysical Union (1984)
- Fellow of the American Meteorological Society
- The Cleveland Abbe Award for Distinguished Service to Atmospheric Sciences (1974)
- NOAA Administrator’s Award (1995)
