= John Pitt Kennedy =

British army officer

Lieutenant-Colonel John Pitt Kennedy (8 May 1796 – 28 June 1879) was a British military engineer, agricultural reformer and civil servant.

== Biography ==
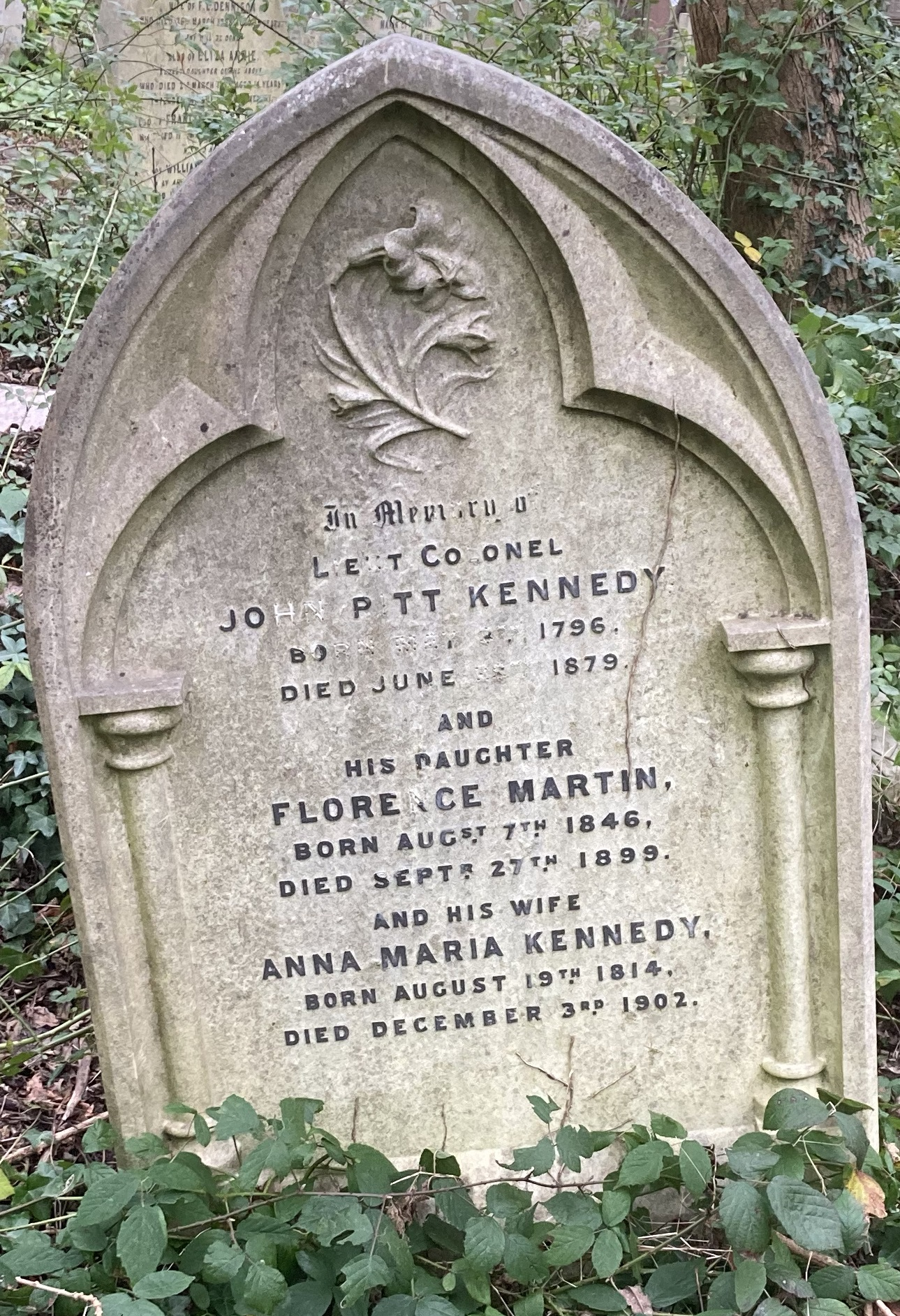
Grave of John Pitt Kennedy in Highgate Cemetery

Kennedy was born at Carndonagh, a town in the north of Inishowen, a peninsula on the north coast of County Donegal in Ulster, the northern province in Ireland; he was educated at Foyle College, Derry, and the Royal Military Academy, Woolwich, becoming a lieutenant in the Royal Engineers in 1815. Four years afterwards, he was sent to Malta, and thence to Corfu. He superintended the construction of a canal at Lefkada (1820), served next under Sir Charles Napier at Cephalonia (building lighthouses, roads, and quays) and was sub-inspector of militia in the Ionian Islands (1828–31).

During a spell in India he met Sir Charles Napier and when he returned to Ireland he set up agricultural schools designed to improve the economy of the country. One was at Cloghan near Ballybofey, and another at Eglinton near Derry. He became a farm manager and married Anna, daughter of Sir Charles Styles, who owned large estates around Ballybofey, in 1838. In 1837, Kennedy established the Loughash Institute and hired James Moore as director (see ''Digest of Evidence Taken Before Her Majesty's Commissioners of Inquiry'') pp. 43–44. Kennedy's methods of improving the condition of the agricultural classes are indicated by the title of his work, Instruct; Employ; Don't Hang Them: or Ireland Tranquilized without Soldiers and Enriched without English Capital (1835). He wrote several others of similar nature, and as inspector general for Irish education (1837), as secretary to the Devon Commission (1843), and to the Famine Relief Committee (1845), his labours were unceasing in behalf of his native land.

He returned to the army in 1849 as military secretary to Sir Charles Napier and accompanied him to India, where he built the military road named after him and extending from Kalka via Simla to Kunawur and Tibet. He published British Home and Colonial Empire (1865–69), as well as a number of technical works relating to his Indian career.

He was District Grandmaster of Bengal. His son, George Kennedy, was a first-class cricketer.

He died in June 1879 and was buried on the eastern side of Highgate Cemetery.
