= Danyelle Townsend =

Biomedical scientist and academic

Danyelle M. Townsend
- Occupations: Biomedical scientist and academic

Academic background
- Education: BS., Biology and Mathematics; MS., Molecular Genetics; PhD., Cell Biology
- Alma mater: George Mason University, Virginia; University of Virginia School of Medicine

Danyelle M. Townsend is a biomedical scientist, and academic. She is a Professor and acting Department Chair of Drug Discovery and Biomedical Sciences at the Medical University of South Carolina (MUSC).

Townsend's lab utilizes proteomics and analytical biochemistry to identify molecular targets affected by oxidative and nitrosative stress, exploring the impact of redox signaling on cellular responses. Her research on the redox proteome and associated pathways has contributed to drug discovery and redox biomarker development.

Townsend has authored over 150 peer-reviewed publications including journal articles, book chapters, and co-edited a book titled, Redox and Cancer Part A. In addition, she served as Co-Editor for Biomedicine and Pharmacotherapy from 2014 to 2015, and has been the Editor-in-Chief for this journal since 2015.

== Education ==
In 1993, Townsend graduated from George Mason University with a Bachelor of Science in Biology and Mathematics. She went on to earn a Master of Science in Molecular Genetics from the same university. She received a doctoral degree from the University of Virginia School of Medicine where she focused on cancer cell biology and metabolism. From 2001 to 2004, she served as a post-doctoral fellow in Pharmacology and Experimental Therapeutics at Fox Chase Cancer Center.

== Career ==
Townsend held various academic positions at the Medical University of South Carolina, starting as a Research Assistant Professor (2004) in the Department of Pharmaceutical Sciences. She was appointed as an associate professor in the Drug Discovery and Biomedical Sciences department in 2015 and has been serving as a Professor and acting department chair.

In 2021, Townsend became the co-director of the Administrative Core for the Redox COBRE.

== Research ==
Townsend's research has combined advanced proteomics and drug metabolism with biochemistry to identify molecular targets affected by oxidative and nitrosative stress. Her lab has focused on understanding the events leading to the endoplasmic reticulum (ER) stress response, specifically examining stress-induced impacts on proteins involved in protein folding. Her publication record includes an H-index of over 50, with more than 13,000 citations.

=== Glutathione's impact on cellular balance, diseases, and drug development ===
Townsend's research has focused on the multifaceted role of glutathione and glutathione S-transferase (GST) in human disease, particularly their involvement in anti-cancer drug resistance, protein S-glutathionylation, and redox stress. She explored GSH's role in maintaining cellular balance, serving as a co-factor for enzymes, and influencing posttranslational modifications. This work emphasized GSH's crucial role in combating reactive oxygen species (ROS), implicated in diseases such as cancer, neurodegenerative diseases, cystic fibrosis (CF), HIV, and aging. Collaborating with Tew, she investigated the role of GSTs in the development of resistance to chemotherapy agents, proposing them as inhibitors of the MAP kinase pathway and potential therapeutic targets for various diseases, including neurodegenerative diseases, multiple sclerosis, and asthma. Her studies identified a role for GSTs as enzymatic mediators of S-glutathionylation of proteins. In her further research on cancer chemotherapy, she explored how cisplatin selectively kills proximal tubule cells, identified its metabolic pathway to a nephrotoxin, and showed that the metabolism in these cells is crucial for cisplatin-induced kidney damage, suggesting new targets for inhibition.

=== Redox biology and drug metabolism in disease and therapeutics ===
Townsend has made contributions to the field of biochemistry, particularly in the context of oxidative stress, redox regulation, and their implications in various diseases. Exploring the impact of oxidative stress and redox regulation on cellular differentiation, she investigated their role in diseases associated with abnormal cell differentiation. In a collaborative study with Tapiero and Tew, she provided details on carotenoids as dietary antioxidants, highlighting their role in preventing cancer and cardiovascular diseases by mitigating oxidative damage and promoting intercellular communication. She also identified S-glutathionylation as a cell stress indicator and unfolded protein response regulator, linking it to pathologies and potential therapies influenced by oxidative stress and endoplasmic reticulum redox conditions. In another joint study, her work delved into the role of cysteine S-glutathionylation in redox cell signaling, proposing it as a biomarker for oxidative/nitrosative stress and its utility for individuals exposed to stress-inducing agents affecting protein clusters.

Townsend's research has discussed the multifaceted role of glutathione S-transferase P (GSTP) in mediating S-glutathionylation, negatively regulating kinase pathways, and contributing to cellular redox homeostasis, with implications for drug development. She has also been involved in creating a new zebrafish model to study the role of glutathione S-transferase π1 in development, redox homeostasis, and drug response involving cytotoxicity through endoplasmic reticulum stress and unfolded protein response. Additionally, in an Antioxidants & Redox Signaling review, she analyzed the influence of the S-glutathionylation cycle on protein structure, cellular regulation, and its significance for interventions in stress- and aging-related pathologies. Furthermore, her research has demonstrated that altered GSTP expression within the endoplasmic reticulum regulates protein homeostasis (proteostasis) through S-glutathionylation of ER resident proteins, including PDI and BiP. GSTP leads to S-glutathionylation of binding immunoglobulin protein (BiP), contributing to acquired resistance to Btz in multiple myeloma (MM) cells, representing a novel mechanism of drug resistance in MM. She has also emphasized GSTπ's novel role in enhancing S-glutathionylation reactions under oxidative and nitrosative stress, with implications for stress response and drug resistance in tumors.

=== Drug discovery and biomedical sciences ===
More recently, Townsend's research has shown the potential of the nanomolar GSTP inhibitor TLK199 (Telintra; Ezatiostat) for treating myelodysplastic syndrome and influencing hematopoiesis. Her work has also revealed the embryonic lethality of MGST1 deletion in mice and the significance of MGST1 in vertebrate embryonic development and hematopoiesis, as shown through zebrafish knockdown. Moreover, she has highlighted the evolutionary conservation of mito-ncR-805 retrograde signaling, suggesting therapeutic applications for enhancing mitochondrial bioenergetics. In related research on C57 BL/6 mice, DSBA was found to prevent ionizing radiation-induced suppression of bone marrow hematopoietic cells for the first time, indicating its potential as a radioprotective or preventive agent in cancer treatment.

== Bibliography ==
=== Books ===
- Redox and Cancer Part A (2014) ISBN 9780124201767

=== Selected articles ===
- Townsend, D. M., Tew, K. D., & Tapiero, H. (2003). The importance of glutathione in human disease. Biomedicine & pharmacotherapy, 57(3-4), 145–155.
- Townsend, D. M., & Tew, K. D. (2003). The role of glutathione-S-transferase in anti-cancer drug resistance. Oncogene, 22(47), 7369–7375.
- Townsend, D. M., Deng, M., Zhang, L., Lapus, M. G., & Hanigan, M. H. (2003). Metabolism of cisplatin to a nephrotoxin in proximal tubule cells. Journal of the American Society of Nephrology: JASN, 14(1), 1.
- Tapiero, H., Townsend, D. M., & Tew, K. D. (2004). The role of carotenoids in the prevention of human pathologies. Biomedicine & Pharmacotherapy, 58(2), 100–110.
- Grek, C. L., Zhang, J., Manevich, Y., Townsend, D. M., & Tew, K. D. (2013). Causes and consequences of cysteine S-glutathionylation. Journal of Biological Chemistry, 288(37), 26497–26504.
