= William John Dwyer Burkitt =

British India judge (1872–1918)

William John Dwyer Burkitt (1872, Banda, Bundelkhand, India – May 1918, Nainital, Uttarakhand, India) was a judge in British India.

As a judge he was heavily involved in taxation issues, additionally serving as a Second Lieutenant in the Rohilkand Volunteer Rifles (promoted 1 August 1902) and a major in the 8th (Northern) United Provinces Horse regiment (promoted 1 April 1917).

== Education and career ==
Burkitt was educated at Marlborough College and Balliol College, Oxford. He took his Indian Civil Service exams in 1891 and arrived back in India on 1 November 1893. He served in the North West Provinces of India and Oudh State as an assistant magistrate and collector before rising to joint magistrate and settlement officer.

== Garnett-Orme Murder Case ==
He judged the Garnett-Orme murder case, regarding the murder by strychnine of spiritualist Frances Garnett-Orme at the Savoy Hotel (Mussoorie) in Mussoorie, India.

The case caused a local sensation:

When the trial came up at Allahabad in March 1912, it caused a sensation. Murder by remote-control was something new in the annals of crime. But after hearing many days of evidence about the ladies' way of life, about crystal-gazing and premonitions of death, the court found Miss Mountstephen innocent. The Chief Justice, in delivering his verdict, remarked that the true circumstances of Miss Garnett-Orme's death would probably never be known. And he was right.

Miss Mountstephen applied for probate of her friend's will. But the Garnett-Orme family in England sent out her brother, Mr Hunter Garnett-Orme, to contest it. The case went in favour of Mr Garnett-Orme. The District Judge (W.D. Burkitt) turned down Miss Mountstephen's application on grounds of 'fraud and undue influence in connection with spiritualism and crystal gazing'. She went in appeal to the Allahabad High Court, but the Lower Court's decision was upheld.

Miss Mountstephen returned to England. We do not know her state of mind, but if she was innocent, she must have been a deeply embittered woman. Miss Garnett-Orme's doctor lost his flourishing practice in Mussoorie and left the country too. There were rumours that he and Miss Mountstephen had conspired to get hold of Miss Garnett-Orme's considerable fortune.

There was one more puzzling feature of the case. Mr Charles Jackson, a painter friend of many of those involved, had died suddenly, apparendy of cholera, two months after Miss Garnett-Orme's mysterious death. The police took an interest in his sudden demise. When he was exhumed on 23 December, the body was found to be in a perfect state of preservation. He had died of arsenic poisoning.

Murder or suicide? This puzzle, too, was never resolved. Was there a connection with Miss Garnett-Orme's death? That too we shall never know. Had Conan Doyle taken up Kipling's suggestion and involved himself in the case (as he had done in so many others in England), perhaps the outcome would have been different.

The case managed to reach the occult community in London, with the following appeal appearing in Light – A Journal of Psychical, Occult, and Mystical Research:

"Immediately after the funeral of Miss Orme, Miss Stephens succumbed to a severe and prolonged illness. Meanwhile the will of Miss Orme had been opened and her relatives instituted a lawsuit against Miss Stephens. ' Last year the trial came to an end, the judge declaring in favour of Miss Stephens. This remarkable case caused a great sensation in Calcutta where the two ladies were well known in society. ' We understand that the correspondent who sent the foregoing story from India to Germany gave his name and address, and was regarded as a trustworthy writer. But a somewhat different complexion was given to this tragic affair in a 'Reuter's' telegram from Simla, recently published in the London newspapers. It is as follows :-

In the .Garnett-Orme will case, which came to an end to-day, Mr. Burkitt, district judge of Saharanpur, dismisses Miss Mount-Stephens' application for probate of Miss Garnett-Orme's will on the ground of fraud and undue influence in connection with Spiritualism and crystal-gazing. The judgment gives probate to deceased's relatives, who opposed the application. The action was a sequel to the trial of Miss Mount-Stephens before the High Court at Allahabad last March on a charge of poisoning Miss Garnett-Orme with prussic acid, which resulted in the acquittal of the accused. Evidence showed that Miss Garnett-Orme had been initiated into crystal-gazing and that she had believed in her approaching death, for which she had made elaborate preparations. The post-mortem examination also showed that death was due to poisoning by prussic acid. The defence was that deceased committed suicide owing to grief at the death of her fiancl.. At the trial the judge remarked that the true circumstances of Miss Garnett-Orme's death would probably never be discovered.

We wonder if any ·readers of ' LIGHT' in India can supply us with fuller particulars of this case, especially of the alleged spiritualistic part of it. The judge's decision regarding the will certainly falsifies the astrologer's prediction that Miss MountStephens would become an heiress-if such a prediction was made."

Burkitt discussed the case with his good friend Rudyard Kipling. They were both members of the Masonic lodge 'Independence with Philanthropy 2' in Allahabad where they discussed the case. Kipling indicated that Garnett-Orme case should be written into a book.

Rudyard Kipling wrote to Arthur Conan Doyle, urging him to write a story about a "murder by suggestion". Conan Doyle judged that the story was good but not right for Sherlock Holmes.

Although Conan Doyle never visited to investigate, he mentioned it to Agatha Christie and her debut The Mysterious Affair at Styles was the result.

== Personal life ==
Burkitt married Noel Stephanie Woodham with whom he had a son William and a daughter Mary. The couple divorced – a rarity before the divorce laws, requiring assent of parliament.

His second wife Marjorie Corbett was from the Anglo-Indian Corbett family known most for tiger-hunter, conservationist & author Jim Corbett. They lived in Kenfield House, Nainital (now part of Kumaun University) and had two daughters, Patricia and Catherine.

Kenfield House was taken over by the government when Kumaon University was founded in 1973. The smaller Kenfield Cottage survives as a private residence.

His first wife remarried in Dehradun to Sir Herbert Mullaly, who accepted the surrender for the British in the Second Boer War.

William died young from pneumonia on 19 May 1918 and is buried in Nainital.

His father Judge Sir William Burkitt was the Puisne judge, the most senior judge in British India.
