= Robert O. Harris (lawyer) =

American labor lawyer (1929–2007)

Robert O. Harris (November 11, 1929 – October 1, 2007) was an American labor lawyer who served as Chairman of the National Mediation Board and ombudsman of the International Monetary Fund.

== Biography ==
Harris was born in New York City. He graduated from Columbia College in 1951, and received a LL.B. from Yale Law School in 1954.

He served in the army in the 1950s and worked in the general counsel's office for the Department of Health, Education and Welfare from 1957 to 1959 and in the solicitor's office at the Department of Labor from 1959 to 1961.

In 1961, he received a LL.M. degree from Georgetown University Law Center.

From 1961 to 1967, he was assistant to the chairman of the National Labor Relations Board. He then worked in the United States Senate for the next 11 years, serving as counsel to the U.S. Senate Labor Subcommittee from 1967 to 1969, and from 1969 to 1971 staff director and counsel to the Senate Committee on Labor and Public Welfare.

From 1971 to 1976, he was staff director and counsel for the Democratic majority on the Senate's District of Columbia Committee and played a key role in the passing the District of Columbia Home Rule Act. Harris also served as an alternate member of the National Capital Planning Commission.

On July 20, 1977, President Jimmy Carter named Harris to the National Mediation Board, which governs labor relations in the railroad and airline fields. He twice served as chairman from 1979 to 1980 and from 1982 to 1983 and was reappointed to the board by Presidents Jimmy Carter and Ronald Reagan, serving until 1984.

Harris was the International Monetary Fund's ombudsman from 1984 until 1989, then worked as an arbitrator and mediator in the airline industry.

In the presidencies of Ronald Reagan and Bill Clinton, Harris served on various presidential emergency boards, which convene when labor disputes threaten to interrupt interstate commerce.

Harris served as a trustee of the National Cathedral School and lived in Washington, D.C. until 1994, when he moved to Chevy Chase, Maryland. He died of pancreatic cancer Oct. 1, 2007 at Georgetown University Hospital.
