= Paul W. Ward =

American newspaper editor

Paul William Ward
- Born: October 9, 1905; Lorain, Ohio
- Died: November 24, 1976
- Occupation: journalist

Paul William Ward (1905-1976) was a Baltimore Sun correspondent who won a Pulitzer Prize for his overseas reporting "Life in the Soviet Union" in 1948.

== Early life ==
A native of Lorain, Ohio, Paul Ward was educated at Middlebury College in Vermont. From 1926 to 1930, he worked for the New Bedford's Standard and later joined the Sun in Baltimore as a business correspondent. After three years on the staff in the Baltimore Sun, Ward was transferred to the Washington bureau, where he specialized in covering congressional and departmental affairs.

== Career ==
In 1937, Ward was transferred to London where he took charge of the Sun's local bureau. As a diplomatic correspondent, he participated in the coverage of the first events of World War II, but in 1940 he returned to the United States. He was assigned to Washington to report on State Department news and international politics until 1945. He covered the Dumbarton Oaks Conference of 1944, the Treaty of San Francisco in 1945, the Foreign Ministers Conference in Paris and New York. Beyond that, he covered local events for the Free French news agency, for which he later was named a chevalier of the French Legion of Honor.

During 1946, Ward spent some time in the Soviet Union, where he attended as a reporter the Foreign Ministers Conference and acquainted with the way of life in the country. The journalist reflected his experience in a series of articles "Life in the Soviet Union" that earned the Pulitzer Prize for International Reporting in 1948.

From the 1940s to 1970, Paul Ward worked as The Sun's diplomatic correspondent. Six years after his retirement from reporting in 1970, Ward died at Georgetown University Hospital at the age of 71. In 1984, his widow Dorothy Cate Ward and their children established an award in memory of the journalist. The award is recognized annually to first-year students of Middlebury College who produced outstanding essays during the academic year.
