= District Grand Lodge of Bengal =

Masonic hall in India

The District Grand Lodge of Bengal is a Masonic Lodge in India under the United Grand Lodge of England, based out of Freemasons Hall, Park Street, Kolkata (19 Mother Teressa Sarani).

The District Grand Lodge of Bengal has exercised authority over freemasonry under the UGLE in India since 1729, when Captain Ralph Farrwinter, an officer of the East India Company, was appointed Provincial Grand Master for East India in Bengal, and warranted the first Indian lodge East India Arms, No. 72, based in Fort William, Calcutta (Firminger 6).

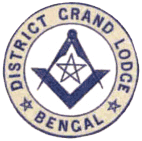
Seal of the District Grand Lodge of Bengal

Members of the District Grand Lodge of Bengal were some of the biggest figures of the British Raj.

== Emir of Afghanistan ==
It was the scene of the induction of Emir Habibullah Khan IV of Afghanistan by Lord Kitchener and Sir William Burkitt on 1 Feb 1907. An account of this highly unusual event was written at the time by Sir Henry McMahon.

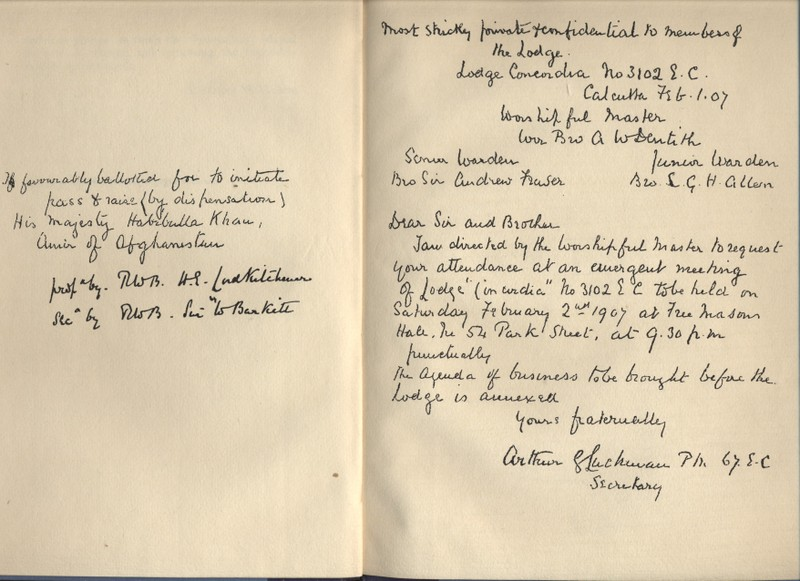
Induction of Emir Habibullah Khan of Afghanistan into Masonry on 1 Feb 1907

== District Grandmasters ==
List of District Grandmasters
Year	District Grandmaster
1862	H. D. Sandeman
1873	J. Pitt Kennedy (acting)
1875	J. Blessington Roberts
1877	J. Pitt Kennedy
1879	Henry Thoby Prinsep
1897	Brigadier General A. G. Yeatman-Biggs
1898	Henry Thoby Prinsep
1904	Sir W. R. Burkitt (judge)
1908	Sir John Stanley
1911	Sir Lawrence Jenkins
1913	Baron Carmichael
1917	Earl of Ronaldshay
1923	Sir W. J. Reid
1926	Henry Rivers Nevill
1930	Sir Eric Studd
1938	Charles Carey Morgan
1940	Archibald Barr-Pollock
1954	Frank Carlile Kidd
1960	K. B. Large
1966	Donald Fordwood
1972	A. M. Adams
1982	Vahan Poladian
1988	Archibald Israel Edwards
1994	L. O. H. de Silva
1998	Iqbal Ahmed
2012	K. S. David

== Lodges ==
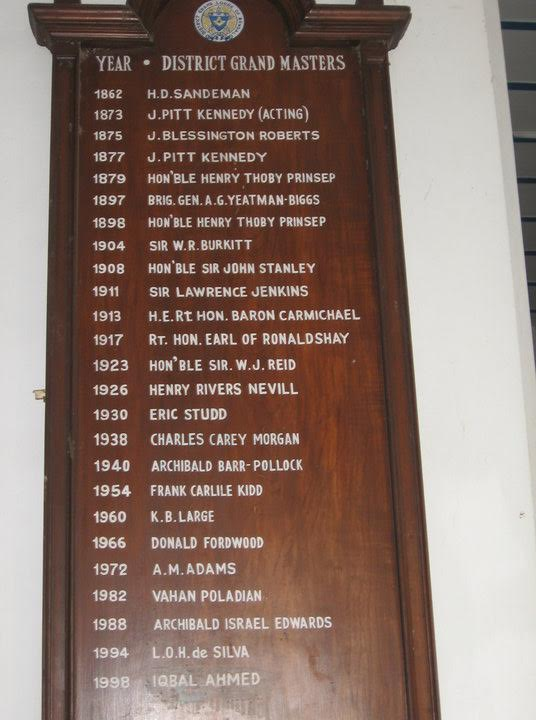
List of District Masters of Bengal, Park Street Lodge, Calcutta

Lodge No.	Lodge Name	Location
67	Star in the East	Calcutta
438	Lodge of Harmony	Kanpur
486	The St. John's Lodge	Calcutta
1490	Pioneer	Asansol
1865	True Freemasonry	Calcutta
2037	Princep	Calcutta
2871	Federation	Calcutta
3054	Calcutta	Calcutta
3351	United Dooars	Calcutta
3618	Templar	Calcutta
3865	Tisco	Jamshedpur
4229	St. Andrew	Kulti
4594	Mymensingh	Calcutta
4814	Darius	Calcutta
5817	Bengal Masters	Calcutta
6746	Martiniere	Calcutta
6931	Light in Andamans	Port Blair
8194	Kathmandu of Nepal	Kathmandu, Nepal
