= George Kennedy (cricketer) =

English cricketer and British Army officer

Personal information
- Full name: George Marius Kennedy
- Born: July 1841
- Died: 6 March 1869 (aged 27); Secunderabad, Hyderabad State, British India
- Batting: Unknown
- Bowling: Unknown

Career statistics
Competition	First-class
Matches	2
Runs scored	53
Batting average	13.25
100s/50s	–/–
Top score	28
Balls bowled	193
Wickets	7
Bowling average	18.71
5 wickets in innings	1
10 wickets in match	–
Best bowling	5/70
Catches/stumpings	1/–
- Source: Cricinfo, 16 November 2019

George Marius Kennedy (July 1841 – 6 March 1869) was an English first-class cricketer and British Army officer.

The son of John Pitt Kennedy, he was born in July 1841 and was educated at Cheltenham College. Kennedy played first-class cricket for the Gentlemen of the North against the Gentlemen of the South on two occasions in 1861 and 1862. In the 1861 fixture, he took a five wicket haul in the Gentlemen of the South's first-innings, taking figures of 5 for 70. After leaving Cheltenham, he attended the Royal Military Academy, Woolwich. He graduated from Woolwich into the Royal Artillery as a lieutenant in 1864. While serving in British India, Kennedy was part of a tiger hunting expedition near Secunderabad when he became ill from heat stroke, dying on 6 March 1869.
