= Lillian B. Miller =

American art historian

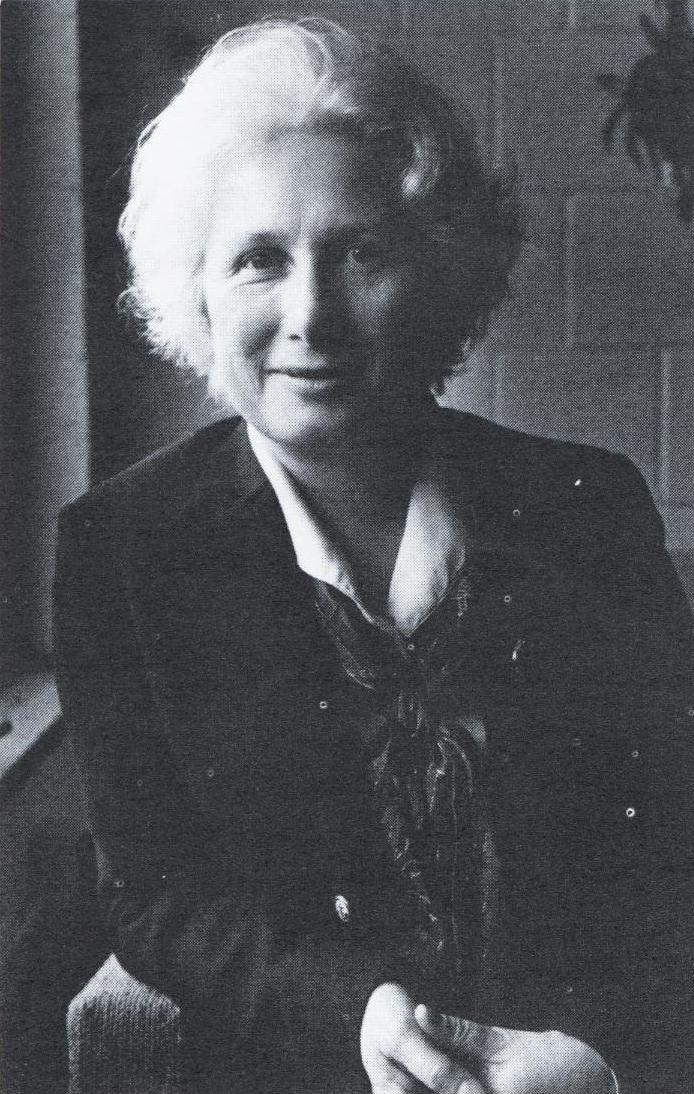
- Miller circa 1981
- Born: Lillian Beresnack; 1923; Boston, Massachusetts, U.S.
- Died: November 27, 1997 (aged 74); Washington, D.C., U.S.
- Education: Radcliffe College (A.B.); Columbia University (A.M., Ph.D.)
- Occupation: Art historian
- Employer: Smithsonian Institution
- Spouse: Nathan Miller

Lillian B. Miller (1923–1997) was an American art historian who served as historian of American culture at the National Portrait Gallery. She was known for her work studying Charles Willson Peale and his family.

== Biography ==
Lillian Beresnack was born in 1923 in Boston to Lithuanian and Russian immigrant parents. She was the daughter of a Kosher butcher. As a child, her passion was literature. She attended Dorchester High School for Girls.

Beresnack then matriculated to Radcliffe College, becoming the first member of her family to attend college. She commuted from the Mattapan neighborhood of Boston and worked as a secretary. She graduated Radcliffe in 1943 with a Bachelor of Arts degree in American history and literature.

She then attended Columbia University as a graduate student, where she worked as a secretary to historian Jacques Barzun and literary professor Lionel Trilling. She ultimately received an A.M. and a Ph.D. in American history from Columbia. When Mary McCarthy left her teaching job at Bard College in 1947, Barzun and Trilling recommended Beresnack as a replacement, and she ultimately taught there for three years. In 1948, she married Nathan Miller, an economics historian whom she met in a seminar on American history.

In the 1950s, the Millers were living in Manhattan and having children. Miller was rejected for an American Association of University Women fellowship because she was pregnant.

In 1960, both Millers went to work at University of Wisconsin–Milwaukee, where the university abandoned a nepotism rule to allow them to teach in the same history department. In the late 1960s, Miller published her dissertation, "Patrons and Patriotism: The Encouragement of Fine Arts in the United States: 1790–1860". This ultimately led to her getting a job as historian of the Smithsonian Institution's National Portrait Gallery in 1971. The Millers thus moved to Bethesda, Maryland; her husband, who maintained his professor post at UWM, commuted to Milwaukee.

In 1981, she took a professor job at the Rochester Institute of Technology while maintaining her position at the Smithsonian.

Miller died on November 27, 1997, of a cerebral hemorrhage at Georgetown University Hospital in Washington, D.C.
