= Thomas Macpherson =

Thomas Macpherson is the name of:

- Thomas Macpherson, 1st Baron Macpherson of Drumochter (1888–1965), Labour Party politician
- Tommy Macpherson (1920–2014), Scottish businessman and soldier from Biallid
- Thomas Henry Macpherson (1842–1903), Canadian merchant and politician

== See also ==
- Thomas McPherson (disambiguation)
