= Mattapan =

Neighborhood of Boston, Massachusetts, US

Coordinates: 42°16′20″N 71°05′13″W

- Neighborhood of Boston
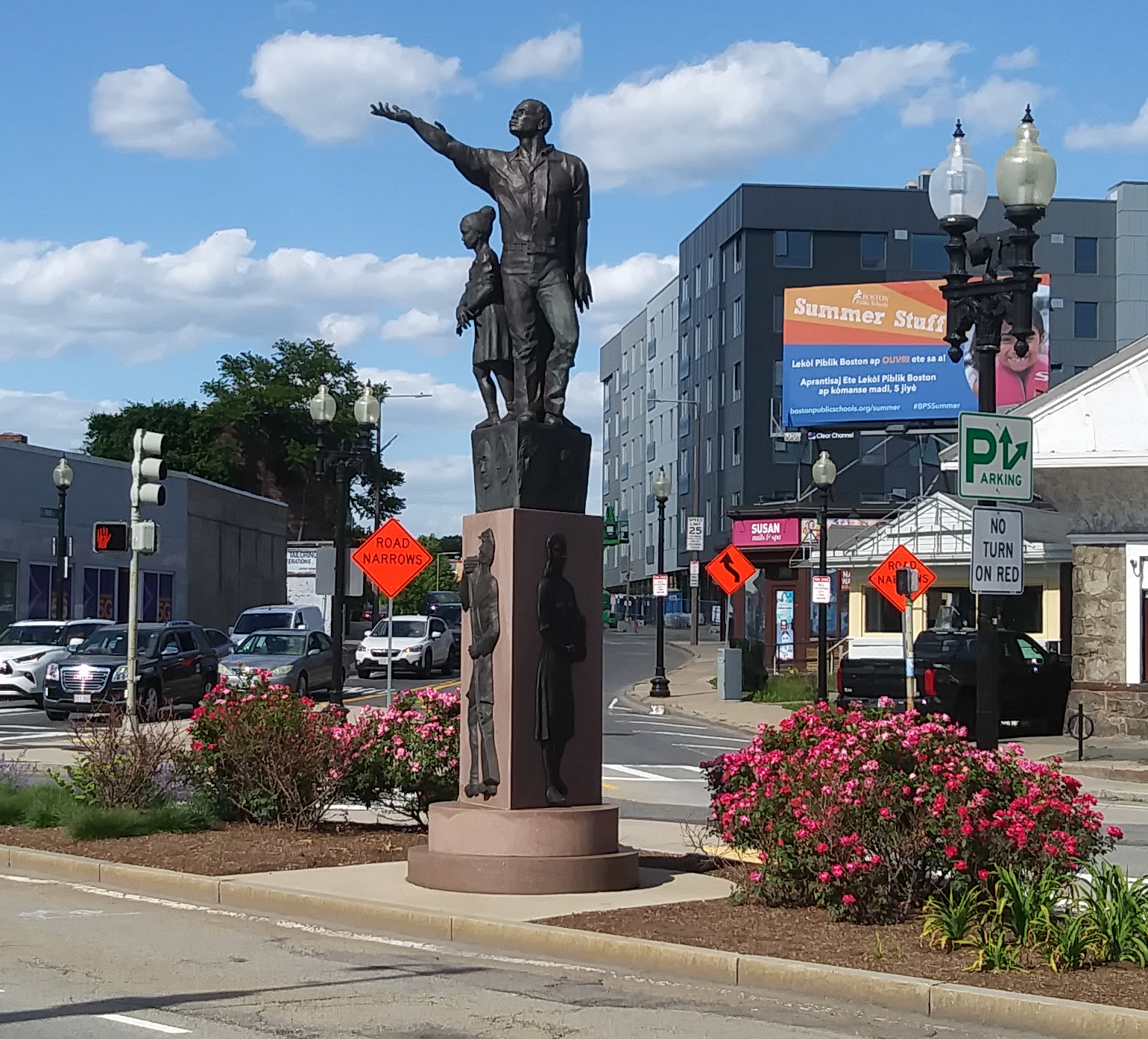
- Interactive map of Mattapan
- Country: United States
- State: Massachusetts
- County: Suffolk
- Neighborhood of: Boston
- Annexed by Boston: Oct 7 1870

Population (2010)
  - Total: 36,480
- Time zone: UTC-5 (Eastern)
- Zip Code: 02126
- Area code: 617 / 857

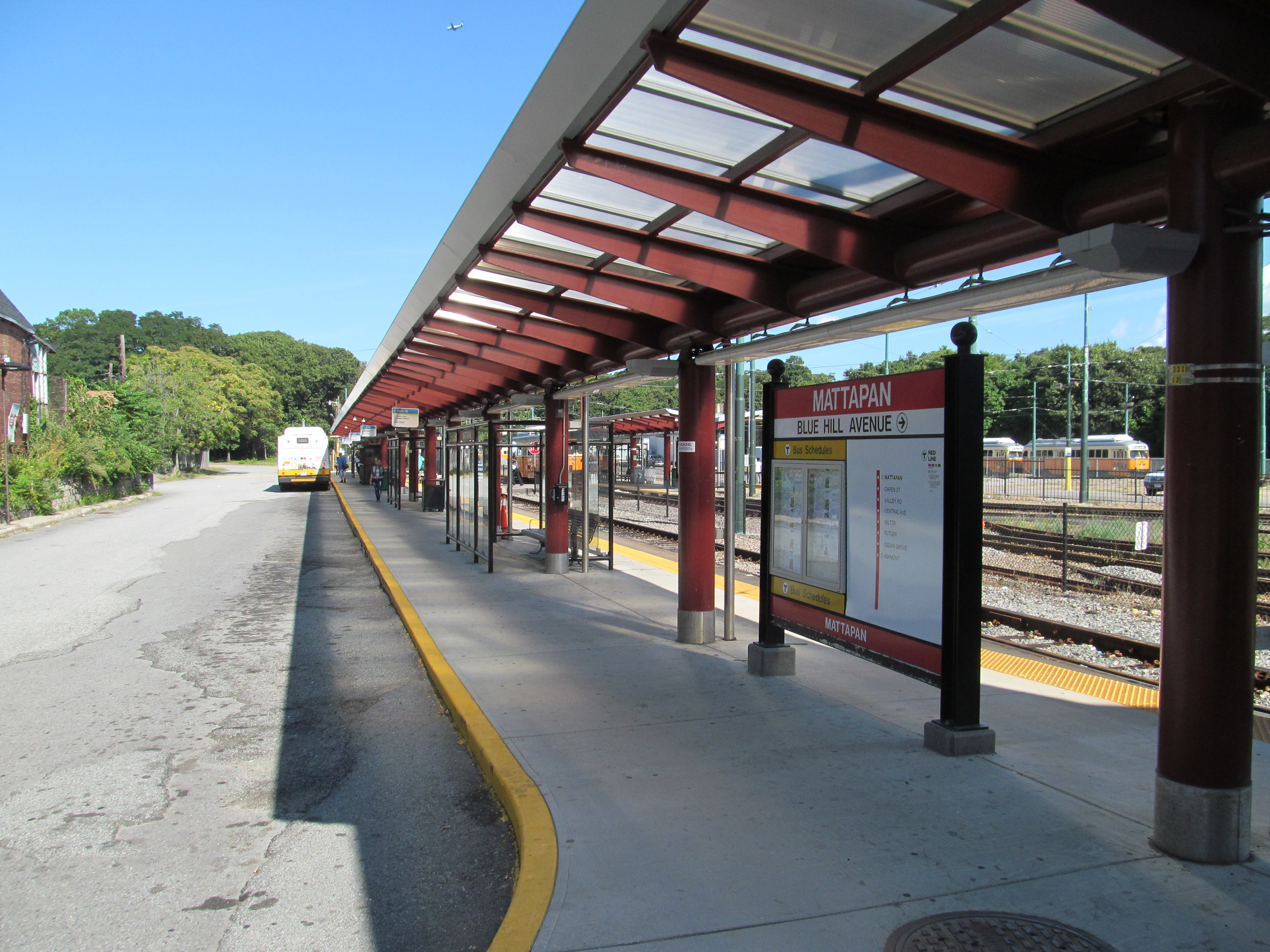
Mattapan bus loop

Mattapan (/ˈmætəpæn/) is a neighborhood in Boston, Massachusetts, United States. Mattapan is the original Massachusett name for the Dorchester area, possibly meaning "a place to sit." At the 2010 census, it had a population of 36,480, with the majority of its population being immigrants.

Like other neighborhoods of the late 19th and early 20th century, Mattapan developed, residentially and commercially, as the railroads and streetcars made downtown Boston increasingly accessible. Predominantly residential, Mattapan is a mix of public housing, small apartment buildings, single-family houses, and two- and three-family houses (known locally as three-deckers or triple-deckers). Blue Hill Avenue and Mattapan Square, where Blue Hill Avenue, River Street, and Cummins Highway meet, are the commercial heart of the neighborhood, home to banks, law offices, restaurants, and retail shops. The new Mattapan Branch of the Boston Public library opened 2009, at a cost of more than $4 million. Mattapan is next to the green space of Harambee Park in Franklin Field Dorchester. The Boston Nature Center and Wildlife Sanctuary, Clark-Cooper Community Gardens, and historic Forest Hill Cemetery all legally in Forest Hills of West Roxbury are considered by some green space within the neighborhood of Mattapan. Mattapan's demographics are diverse, with a large population of Haitians, Caribbean immigrants, and African Americans. Mattapan has public services such as a recently renovated community health center, and constable services. Mattapan MBTA Station is the last stop of the Red Line Extension Trolley which is accessible via Ashmont and other points along the route in Dorchester and Milton.

== History ==
=== Indigenous ===
Mattapan was named and first inhabited by Native Americans. Although humans are known to have inhabited eastern North America for at least 15,000 years, the presence of a continental ice sheet extending south to the level of Long Island and Cape Cod would have limited human habitation in Mattapan until the end of the last Ice Age, about 11,700 years ago. Sea level rise since then and disruption of soil layers from urban development in Boston limit the earliest confirmed settlements in the Mattapan area to the Woodland period beginning 2000 years ago, when the archaeological record attests to hunting, fishing, and shellfish gathering around the Neponset River and quarrying for stone points in the Blue Hills.

Mattapan was the name given by native Massachusett people to an area north of the Neponset River, possibly meaning "a sitting down place" related to mattappu or "he sits down." It fell within the area controlled by the Neponset sachem Chickatawbut at the time of contact with English explorers and settlers in the early seventeenth century. Although the Massachusett practiced a seasonally shifting settlement pattern, they have left a lasting impact on the layout of current day Mattapan in the form of footpaths that were adopted and eventually transformed into roadways by later settlers: Mattapan and Lower Mills were the main fords of the Neponset River prior to contact, and present day Adams St. and River St. connected Mattapan to fishing weirs at Lower Mills and the Neponset River outlet, while Squantum St. and Center St. in Milton connected it to shell fishing at Moswetuset Hummock and quarrying in the Blue Hills, respectively.

Dorchester was settled by English colonists in 1630 and a source from 1634 lists "Matampan" as the Massachusett name for Dorchester. Virgin soil epidemics ravaged the Massachusett in the early 1600s, with smallpox killing Chickatawbut and a large portion of his 3000 warriors in 1633, after which his brother and successor as sachem, Cutshamekin sold large portions of Massachusett land along the Neponset River. Migration of Massachusett to praying towns in the mid-1600s and forced internment of Native Americans during King Philip's War led to further declines in Massachusett influence on Mattapan, though later Massachusett sachems still held and sold title to lands in Dorchester.

=== 20th century ===
At the turn of the 20th century, the population of Mattapan was largely Caucasian, but starting in the late 1960s, blockbusting intentionally designed to destabilize the neighborhood drove many long-term residents out of Mattapan. In the 1980s, a significant number of Haitians immigrated to Mattapan, leading to the current demographic population. Mattapan has become an important center for the Haitian cultural, social, and political life in the state of Massachusetts. As of 2015, Mattapan also has a large population of African Americans, Jamaicans, and other Caribbean immigrants. During the 1960s and 1970s, Mattapan underwent a major change in the makeup of its population. It shifted from a predominantly Jewish neighborhood to one that is now largely African American and Caribbean American having a population of 37,486 that is over 77% African American and Caribbean American.

The period from 1968 to 1970 made up the most dramatic period of ethnic transition in Boston. Hillel Levine and Lawrence Harmon, in their 1991 book The Death of an American Jewish Community, argue that redlining, blockbusting, and fear in neighborhood residents created by real estate agents brought about panic selling and white flight. The banking consortium Boston Banks Urban Renewal Group (B-BURG) allegedly drove the Jewish community out of Mattapan and are held partially responsible for the ensuing deterioration of the neighborhood, especially along the Blue Hill Avenue corridor. According to Levine and Harmon, the reason behind this orchestrated attack on the community was to lower market values to buy property, sell the housing with federally guaranteed loans at inflated prices to black families who could not afford it, and to get the white community to buy property owned by the banks in the suburbs. Gerald Gamm disputes these allegations in his 1999 book Urban Exodus, arguing that differences between the Jewish and Catholic communities in Boston constituted the greater contributing factor. As Jewish people moved out of Mattapan, Caribbean Americans and African Americans began to move in.

== Demographics ==
According to the Boston Redevelopment Authority, 70.3% of households are family based rather than single men and women or couples. It was also noted that Mattapan has among the highest percentage of people who speak French in their homes. Based on percentages in Mattapan, the cost of living is 8% lower than Boston, the total crime rate is 27% higher compared to Boston, the number of high school graduates are 11% lower than Boston, employment is 9% lower, and housing is 23% lower than Boston. The majority of homes in Mattapan are triple decker apartment buildings.

Today Mattapan is seeing another major population shift, albeit a natural turn over of housing, as a large number of immigrants from Haiti and other Caribbean countries continue to move in. Mattapan now has the largest Haitian community in Massachusetts, and is also largely made up of African Americans and immigrants from other Caribbean countries. In 2013 the population in Mattapan was 36,299. Of this total 11% were Caucasian, 82% were African American, 1% were Asian, 2% were a mixed race, and 6.5% were devoted to other races. According to the Boston Redevelopment Authority 72.4% of the population living in Mattapan were born in Massachusetts, 23.6% were born outside of the state, and 3.2% were born outside of the United States. Of those born outside of the United States 33.2% were born in Haiti and 17.2% were born in Jamaica. For the total adult population, 38.9% graduated from high school, while only 14.7% have a bachelor's degree. The median household income in Mattapan is $44,744. There are an average of 12,345 people per square mile.

=== Citizenship ===
Approximately 35.6% of Mattapan's population is foreign born, and slightly more than half of those who are foreign born have become United States citizens (53.8% of foreign born citizens). Since 1980, the majority of Mattapan has been inhabited by foreign born citizens, and until about 1990 many of these foreign born inhabitants became U.S. citizens; after the 1990s, many people who immigrated to the United States did not become U.S. citizens[1]. The largest percentage of the population who were immigrants to the United States are Haitian (33.2%), while Jamaicans and Trinidadians make up about 27.6% of Mattapan's population.

=== Languages ===
Though Mattapan is racially diverse, the predominant language is English. About 18.9% of the population speak French; this includes the Patois, Creole, and Cajun languages. A small portion of the population speak Portuguese Creole (0.3%)

The languages spoken at home also vary from age; for example, approximately 68.2% of children who are 5–17 years old speak only English, while 16.9% of those children speak other Indo-European languages. Among adults aged 18–24 years, 23.4% speak other Indo-European languages; while 63.9% of adults who are 18 to 24 years old speak English.

== Income status ==
The median household income status for someone residing in Mattapan is around $44,744 per year as of 2011. A total of 71.3% of the residents working in Mattapan are blue collar workers and the remaining 28.7% are white collar workers. About 64.5% of households are family households, while the other 35.5% of the people living in Mattapan are not family households. The medium family income is approximately $54,119. As of 2011 26.2% of households received food stamps/SNAP. Out of that percentage, 49.5% of those households were under the poverty level.

== Transportation ==
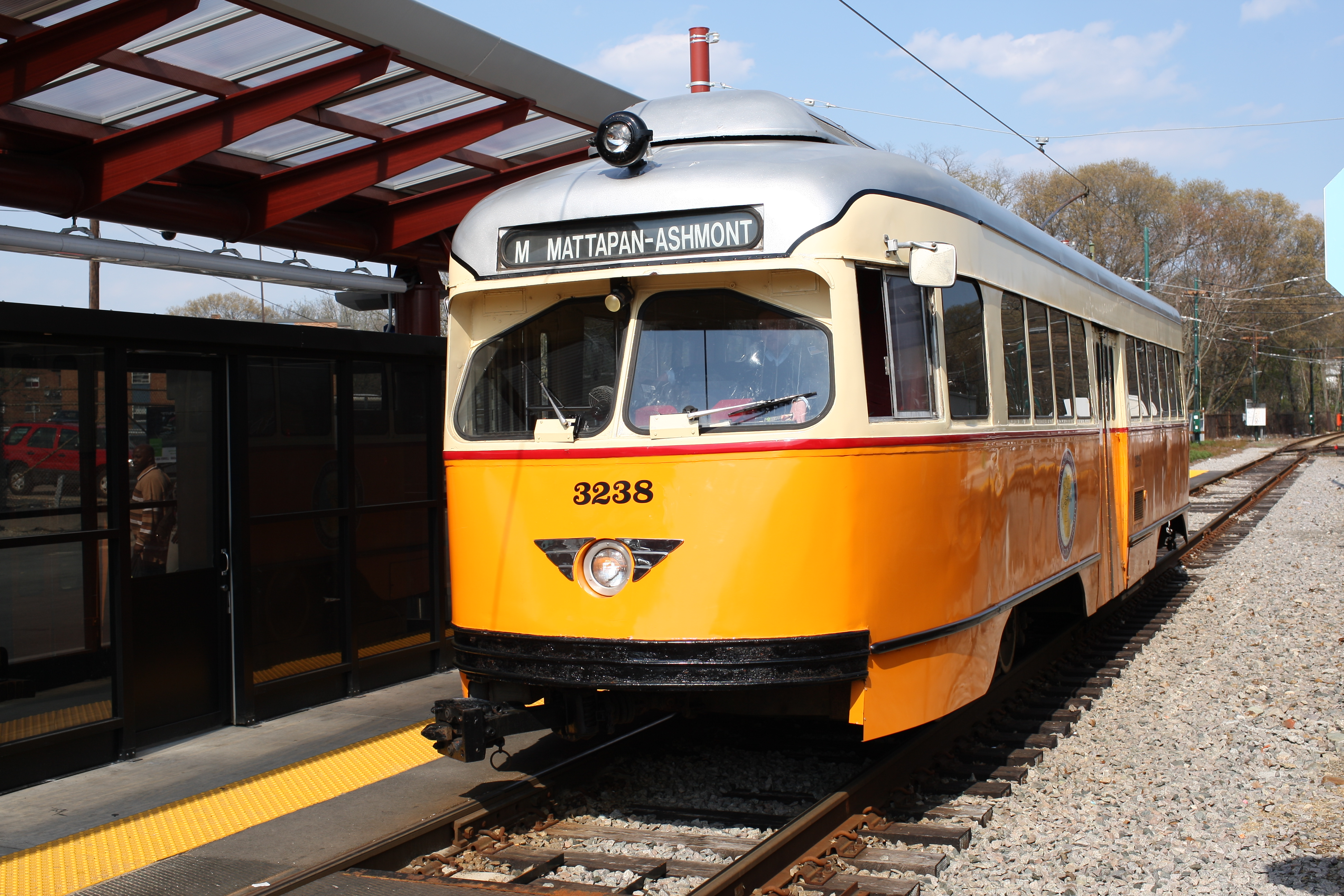
PCC 3238 at Mattapan

The Mattapan Line light rail line of the MBTA serves Mattapan as well as several bus routes. In the beginning of 2016, the Mattapan trolley was in danger of being derailed and being transformed into bus routes instead, which would be more cost effective than keeping the trolley as rail line. However, Boston officials have fought to cancel this transformation because although this would be more cost effective, property values would decrease and would "most importantly, torpedo a mixed-use, mixed-income residential-retail project slated for the Mattapan station parking lot". At this point in time, the project to convert the Trolley into buses will not be carried out.

The Fairmount Line of the MBTA Commuter Rail also serves Mattapan at the Morton Street and Blue Hill Avenue stations, providing service to downtown Boston and the suburbs. The Fairmount Corridor Commuter Rail Line currently runs from South Station south through the Boston neighborhoods of Dorchester, Roxbury, Mattapan and terminates in Readville section of Hyde Park. It consists of approximately 9.2 miles of track, nine stations (South Station, Newmarket, Uphams Corner, Four Corners / Geneva, Talbot Avenue, Morton Street, Blue Hill Avenue, Fairmount, and Readville) and forty-one bridges. It is the only Commuter Rail Branch that exclusively serves the City of Boston and MBTA's Urban Core.

== Government and infrastructure ==
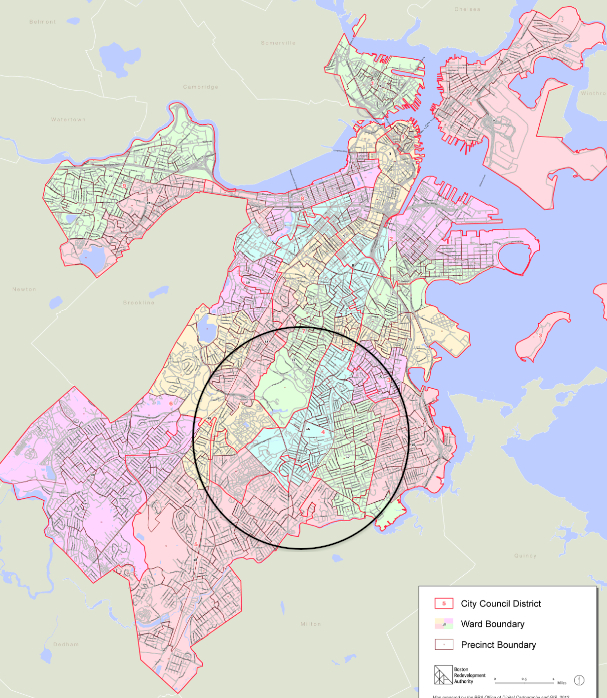
Map of Boston City Council District 4, 2012

The United States Postal Service operates the Zip Code 02126 Mattapan Post Office. The zip code also includes parts of Hyde Park, Forest Hills and a large part of the Lower Mills neighborhoods.

Mattapan is mainly made up of triple and double decker houses. Each apartment of the triple/double deckers consist of either two or three bedrooms, kitchen, one bathroom and living room. They were designed to house small unit families. Mattapan also has a few apartment style buildings, some of which can be found on River Street. Most apartment complexes have a maximum of three bedrooms. These apartments were built recently and an example of this is Mattapan Heights, which was an abandoned rehabilitation facility that was then turned into a gated community with major townhouse apartment styles. Other types of housing are ‘School Housing by Lower Mills’; these complexes are new development in the community.

Recreation Areas/ Green Space Ryan's Playground provides water sprinklers, swings and other activities for children to enjoy. Almont Park and Hunt's Park are also fun for kids, as they provide a range of sporting facilities such as tennis courts, basketball courts and more.

Shopping Districts- Mattapan Square is the shopping district hub, featuring multiple stores. These infrastructures are well grouped together, as there is a very high density among the physical structures in Mattapan.

The Affordable Housing plan in Mattapan is available to residents who have little income.

== Green space ==
- Nearby Harambee Park was built in 1898, designed by Frederick Law Olmsted, the famous American Landscape architect. Originally known as Franklin Field, named after Benjamin Franklin.
- Nearby The Franklin Park Zoo founded in 1912, "Is considered the crown jewel of the Frederick Law Olmsted's Emerald Necklace Park System.
- The Boston Nature Center and Wild Life Sanctuary legally located in the former town of West Roxbury’s Forest Hills neighborhood is a hidden gem and pride of the Mattapan Zip Code spreading across 67 acres. It is home to over 150 species of bird, 40 species of butterflies and more than 350 species of plants. It has Clark-Cooper Community Garden providing options of fresh food and green spaces to over 250 local families. It also has two miles of trails through meadows and woodlands. Part of the site was formerly home to the Boston State Hospital (for mental health) until the facility closed in 1979.
- The Forest Hills Cemetery is a prime example of rural garden cemetery. It has both historic and culture significance of Boston. Founded in 1848 to, "provide a magnificent park-like setting to bury and remember family and friends. It has been added to the National Register of Historic Places in 2004.

== Education ==
=== Primary and secondary schools ===
Boston Public Schools (BPS) operates public schools in Mattapan. Ellison/Parks Early Education School is in Mattapan. Elementary schools include James J. Chittick, Mattahunt, and Charles H. Taylor. Mildred Avenue K-8 School is located in Mattapan. The Young Achievers Science and Mathematics Pilot K-8 School, a BPS school, occupies the former campus of Solomon Lewenberg Middle School, which closed in 2009.

Pope John Paul II Catholic Academy of the Roman Catholic Archdiocese of Boston operated the Mattapan Square Campus, located on 120 Babson Street (Formally the Saint Angela Merci elementary school) until it closed permanently in June 2018.

The five public schools are all part of the Boston Public School system. 40% of male and 33.9% of female students in Mattapan received their high school diplomas.

=== Adult education ===
Mattapan has a population of 3983 (12.2%) with no high school education.

== Healthcare ==
Mattapan Community Health Center, located in heart of the Blue Hill Avenue, has been providing community and public health services to the Mattapan and Hyde Park communities for more than 40 years and is the only health center in the city. It is the primary source of care and resource for its residents and community members. Its mission is to, "Improve the quality of life for residents of Mattapan and surrounding communities by providing comprehensive, accessible, affordable and culturally appropriate community health care services, including primary and preventive health care services." It is also the founding partner of the Boston HealthNet and it is affiliated with Boston Medical Center and Brigham & Women's Hospital.

The Mattapan Adult Day Health Program was founded in 1980. It provides day health services to senior living in Boston areas.

== Services in Mattapan ==
=== Public libraries ===
Boston Public Library operates the Mattapan Branch Library. On December 18, 1849 a Mattapan resident named Increase S. Smith opened the Mattapan Library Association. In 1870 Dorchester, Massachusetts, which included Mattapan, was annexed into Boston. The Mattapan branch began as a reading room attached to the Oakland Hall Building's delivery station. In 1923 the reading room was declared a branch of the Boston Public Library. On June 22, 1931 the Mattapan Library Branch opened on Hazelton Street. The current library opened on February 28, 2009 at 1350 Blue Hill Avenue.

== Notable people ==
- Dana Barros – Former player in the NBA and member of the Boston Celtics, along with three other teams
- Leonard Bernstein – Conductor and composer
- Big Shug – Rapper under DJ Premier and Guru of Gang Starr
- Thomas M. Finneran – Massachusetts politician
- Nat Hentoff – jazz critic and social commentator
- Lillian B. Miller—American art historian, National Portrait Gallery, Smithsonian Institution
- Bill Owens - Massachusetts state politician
- Theodore White – author, political commentator
