= Harambee Park =

Park in Boston

Coordinates: 42°17′32″N 71°05′06″W

- Interactive map of Harambee Park
- Location: Boston, Massachuttes, U.S.
- Designer: Frederick Law Olmsted

Harambee Park is a park located in Dorchester and Mattapan, Boston. Originally known as Franklin Field, it was designed by Frederick Law Olmsted in order to give Bostonians a place to play sports, as well as prevent them from doing it at nearby Franklin Park. During its operation, it has hosted baseball, cricket, and a speedway. Today, the park operates as Harambee Park, and part of the grounds have been turned into a housing project.
