= Robert Newton Harper =

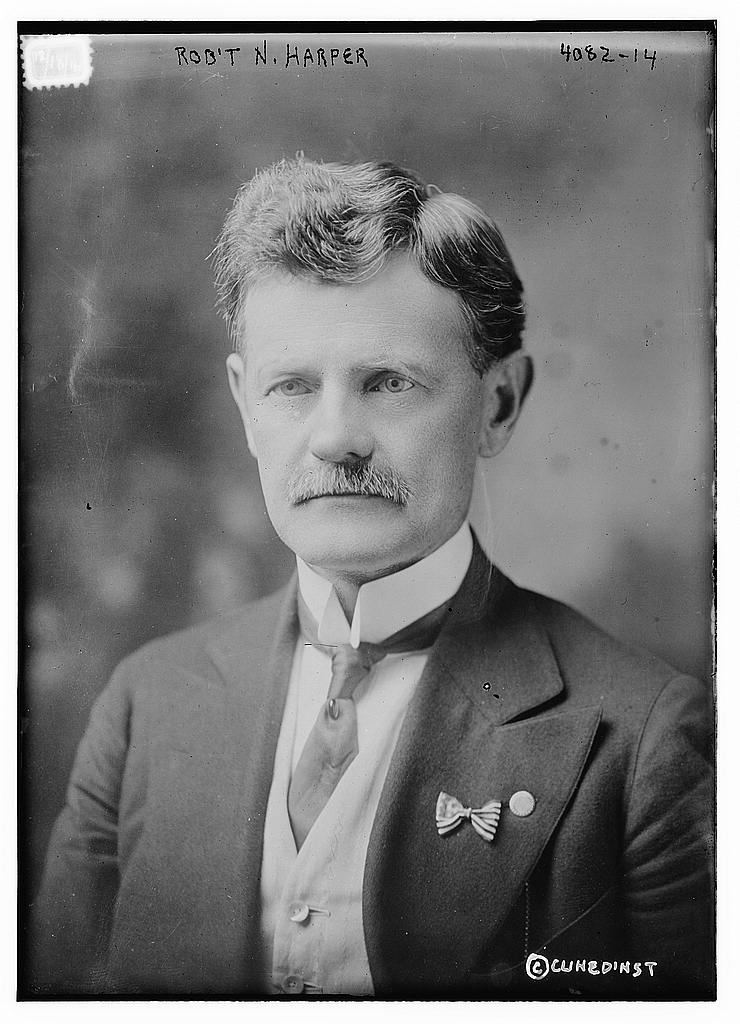
Colonel Robert Newton Harper in 1917

Robert Newton Harper (January 31, 1861 - September 23, 1940) was president of the District of Columbia Pharmaceutical Association and of the National Association of Druggists and Commissioner of Pharmacy of the District of Columbia. He was treasurer of the National Food and Drug Exchange, and of the Washington Wholesale Drug Exchange.

== Biography ==
He was born on January 31, 1861, in Leesburg, Virginia.

He was chairman of the one hundred and sixty member Presidential Inaugural Committee for Woodrow Wilson in 1917. He appointed the first woman to an inaugural committee, Mrs. James S. Boggs. She was the former president of the Women's Wilson League.

He died at Georgetown University Hospital on September 23, 1940, in Washington, DC at age 79. He was buried in Rock Creek Cemetery.
