= Tucson Five =

Alleged participants in the Weather Underground by the FBI

The Tucson Five was a group of house-mates from Los Angeles who were, despite a lack of evidence, alleged by the FBI to have been participants in the Weather Underground. Their case is notable because of the way in which grand jury proceedings and contempt of court charges were used against the group by Guy L. Goodwin of the United States Department of Justice, ultimately leading to a successful appeal to the Supreme Court by one member of the group. The case is additionally notable because the FBI breached the group's attorney–client privilege via wiretaps and black bag jobs.
