= H. H. Burkitt =

Harold Hamilton Burkitt (22 October 1876 – 2 May 1961) was an Irish civil servant of the Indian civil service. Burkitt Road in the neighbourhood of T. Nagar in Chennai is named after him.

== Early life ==
Burkitt was born in Glenties, County Donegal to Emma Eliza Parsons Burkitt and Thomas Henry Burkitt. He was educated at Galway Grammar School and Trinity College Dublin. He passed the Indian civil service examinations held in 1899 and arrived in India on 3 December 1900.

== Career ==
In India, Burkitt served as Assistant Collector and magistrate in the Madras Presidency for sometime before being appointed British Resident to the Cochin kingdom. Burkitt served as British Resident to Cochin from 2 December 1920 to 25 June 1923 and was succeeded by C. W. E. Cotton. He was Commissioner of Madras City in 1919-20 and President and Mayor of the corporation in 1917–18.

He returned to Northern Ireland to live in Belfast, where he died in 1961.
