= Herbert Mullaly =

British Army officer (1860–1932)

Major-General Sir Herbert Mullaly KCMG CB CSI
- Portrait by Walter Stoneman, 1919
- Born: 4 June 1860; British India
- Died: 9 June 1932 (aged 72)

Major-General Sir Herbert Mullaly KCMG CB CSI (4 June 1860 – 9 June 1932) was a British Army officer.

Mullaly was born in British India, the son of John Mullaly of the East India Company and his wife, Hannah. He was baptised in Bombay at three months old.

His military career began in December 1878 when he was commissioned into the Royal Engineers.

Major-General Mullaly saw service in South Africa, was Director of Military Operations in India from 1906 to 1910, and was in charge of East Coast defences during the war. He was on 9 October 1910 promoted to major general.

He served in British India, South Africa and during World War I in England, where he commanded the Thames and Medway Defences.

He authored Russia's March towards India. By An Indian Officer (London; Sampson Low, Marston & Company 1894).

He was appointed a Companion of the Order of the Bath (CB) in 1905, a Companion of the Order of the Star of India (CSI) in 1908, and Knight Commander of the Order of St Michael and St George (KCMG) in 1917. He died in La Tour-de-Peilz, Switzerland in 1932.

His portraits can be found in the National Portrait Gallery.

== Papers ==
Major-General Sir Herbert Mullaly left his decorations, papers, and textbooks in his will to his son, Major Brian Reginald Mullaly, of the Indian Army, with this comment:

"Among them are many original papers, such as original copies of the schemes for the redistribution and reorganisation of the army in India, which were called 'Lord Kitchener Schemes,' but which were evolved entirely out of my own brain, written by my own hand, and were accepted practically in their entirety."

The papers also include various other documents of a confidential nature. General Mullaly requested that none of his diaries or papers, or extracts therefrom, be published before 1950.
