= Guy L. Goodwin =

American lawyer

Guy Lee Goodwin (September 15, 1928 - December 10, 2007) was an American lawyer, and chief of the Special Litigation service of the criminal division of the United States Department of Justice. He was notable for his use of grand juries in attempts to investigate the Weather Underground, and was characterized, by the prominent reporter Jack Anderson, as "President Nixon's 'Witch-Finder General'".

== Early life ==
Born in Kansas City, Kansas, he later served in the Army just after World War II, based in Los Alamos, New Mexico. He graduated from the University of Kansas in 1952 with a combined bachelor's and law degree.

== Death ==
Goodwin died of a stroke December 10, 2007 at Georgetown University Hospital at age 79. He was survived by his wife of 55 years, Frances M. Goodwin; his daughter, Sarah Goodwin Thomas; and three grandchildren.
