= Burkitt Nunatak =

Mountain in Antarctica

Coordinates: 69°42′S 66°53′W

Burkitt Nunatak is a small nunatak, rising to about 1,200 m (3,900 ft) high, located in the north-west part of Dyer Plateau, 17 km (11 mi) west-southwest of Crescent Scarp, Palmer Land, Antarctica. Following glaciological work by the British Antarctic Survey (BAS), 1980–81, the feature was named by the UK Antarctic Place-Names Committee after David M. Burkitt, a BAS general assistant who assisted in the work that season, and was a member of the Joint Services Expedition to Elephant Island, 1970–71.
