= James Parsons Burkitt =

Irish civil engineer and amateur ornithologist

James Parsons Burkitt (20 Aug 1870 – 30 Mar 1959) was an Irish civil engineer and keen amateur ornithologist. He was county surveyor in County Fermanagh from 1900 until his retirement in 1940.

== Early life and education ==
James Burkitt was born on 20 August 1870, at Killybegs, County Donegal, third son of Thomas Henry Burkitt, Presbyterian minister, and his wife Emma Eliza, née Parsons.

Burkitt was educated at Galway Grammar School, and at Queen's College, Galway (then part of the Royal University of Ireland), obtaining the degrees of BA in mathematics (1891) and BE (1892) with first-class honours.

== Career ==
Burkitt then became an assistant to James Perry in Galway, during which period he superintended the underpinning of a large bridge and the erection of a pier and swing bridge over an estuary of the sea. In May 1893 he became assistant engineer to contractor John Meneely Fisher on the Westport & Mulranny extension of the Midland Great Western Railway, and in February 1894 to the partnership of Fisher & Le Fanu (Brinsley Rankine Le Fanu) in the construction of the Collooney & Claremorris railway (part of the Western Railway Corridor). On the completion of the latter, he continued to work for Fisher & Le Fanu on the Belfast waterworks. In 1897 he was employed on the Downpatrick waterworks under Peter Chalmers Cowan. He appears to have moved briefly to County Donegal before being appointed county surveyor for County Fermanagh at the end of 1898 in succession to Frederick Richard Thomas Willson.

He held the County Fermanagh surveyorship for over 40 years. Responsible for extensive road improvements in the county and for the introduction of tarmacadam road surfaces in 1904, he also built several bridges during the 1920s and 1930s. He retired in April 1940.

Burkitt was elected an associate member of the Institution of Civil Engineers on 1 March 1898, and resigned on 9 July 1915. He was elected a member of the Incorporated Association of Municipal and County Engineers on 21 April 1900, and remained a member until 1939 or 1940.

Addresses: Work: Courthouse, Downpatrick, County Down 1897; PO, Letterkenny, County Donegal, 1898; County Surveyor's Office, Enniskillen, 1899–1940. Home: Lawnakilla, near Enniskillen, County Fermanagh.

== Ornithology ==
It was a few years after Burkitt had settled in Fermanagh, when he was 37, that he started to develop an interest in birds. Through his work on the methodology of plotting bird distribution, he became one of Ireland's most influential ornithologists; he also made contributions to the understanding of threat display and territorial behaviour and song, and was the first person to use ringing returns to estimate average age.

Burkitt studied European robins in the garden of his home (called Lawnakilla) near Enniskillen. He started ringing the birds in October 1922, and his research, which was published in the journal British Birds between 1924 and 1926, was one of the first studies of bird behaviour and territory to use rings that enabled individual birds to be identified in the field. Later, at Laragh, Ballinamallard, County Fermanagh, Burkitt proved the longevity of one female robin. He had ringed this bird on 18 December 1927 and trapped her again on 14 July 1938—this robin was at least 11 years old, "the oldest living robin in the world". Burkitt's work was greatly admired by David Lack, who carried out further research on robins in the 1930s and 1940s.

== Personal life ==
Burkitt died on 30 March 1959 at Ballinamallard, Co. Fermanagh, and was buried in Trory churchyard. He was married to Glendoline, a daughter of William Henry Hill of Cork. Burkitt's elder son was the surgeon Denis Parsons Burkitt FRS (1911–1993), after whom Burkitt's lymphoma is named.

== Publications ==
- Burkitt, J. P. (1924–6). A study of robins by means of marked birds. British Birds 17: 294–303; 18: 97–103, 250–7; 19: 120–4; 20: 91–101.
