= Georgetown Lombardi Comprehensive Cancer Center =

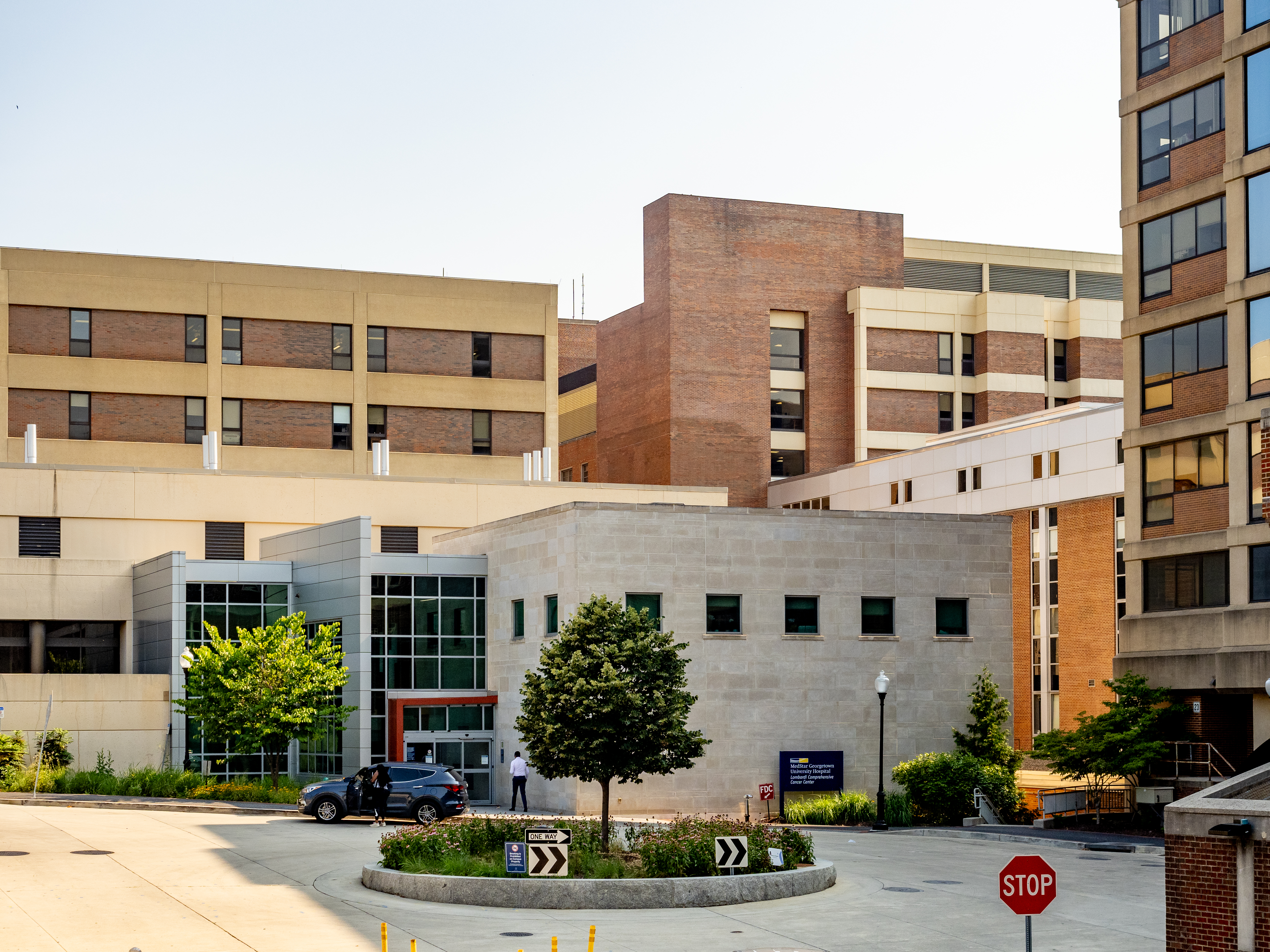
- The Georgetown Lombardi Comprehensive Cancer Center

Geography
- Location: 3970 Reservoir Road NW, Washington, D.C., United States
- Coordinates: 38°54′39.3″N 77°04′33.0″W

Organization
- Type: Specialist
- Religious affiliation: Catholic (Jesuit)
- Affiliated university: Georgetown University Medical Center

Services
- Speciality: Cancer

History
- Founded: 1970

Links
- Website: lombardi.georgetown.edu
- Lists: Hospitals in Washington, D.C.

The Georgetown Lombardi Comprehensive Cancer Center is a cancer center located on the medical campus of Georgetown University in Washington, DC. It is one of four components of the Georgetown University Medical Center and is affiliated with MedStar Georgetown University Hospital. Additionally, it partners with MedStar Health for regional patient care. It is named in honor of Vince Lombardi, who was treated for cancer at Georgetown University Hospital.

== History ==
Georgetown Lombardi was established in 1970 and received its initial National Cancer Institute designation in 1974. It was designated a Comprehensive Cancer Center, the highest level of certification for cancer centers, in 1990.

== Research ==
Lombardi receives over $100 million in grant funding for research purposes. These grants support research initiatives such as the Breast Cancer Research Program, Cancer Prevention and Control Program, Experimental Therapeutics Program, and Molecular Oncology Program. Designated centers at Lombardi include the Ruesch Center for gastrointestinal cancers, the Nina Hyde Center for Breast Cancer Research, the Innovation Center for Biomedical Informatics, the Fisher Center for Hereditary Cancer and Clinical Genomics Research, and the Center for Drug Discovery. The Capital Breast Care Center and the John Theurer Cancer Center are located offsite.
