= Centurion (organization) =

Non-profit organization in the USA

Centurion (formerly Centurion Ministries) is a non-profit organization located in Princeton, New Jersey, with a mission to exonerate innocent individuals who have been wrongly convicted and sentenced to life sentences or death.

In many of the cases Centurion takes on, no DNA or other scientific evidence is available to prove their clients’ innocence. Centurion does not require the availability of specific evidence to take on a case. Centurion conducts case re-investigations and provides legal representation and post-release support for the wrongly convicted.

== History ==
Centurion Ministries was founded in 1983 by Jim McCloskey as a result of his investigation on behalf of a prisoner, Jorge De Los Santos.

McCloskey learned of De Los Santos in 1980 while a seminary student at Princeton Theological Seminary in Princeton, New Jersey. McCloskey used his own funds to investigate De Los Santos' claim of innocence. He located the chief witness against De Los Santos, who recanted his false trial testimony. McCloskey then hired Paul Casteleiro, a Hoboken lawyer, to write the writ to bring De Los Santos' case back into court. A U.S. District Court judge overturned the conviction and in 1983 De Los Santos was freed.

Centurion is the first organization to investigate cases of wrongful convictions in the US and Canada. In 1987, California businesswoman, Kate Germond, joined McCloskey and together they built an organization that has secured the release of 67 (as of 15 December, 2025) wrongly convicted men and women from all across the United States and Canada.

McCloskey retired in May 2015 and Germond is now the Executive Director of Centurion. Centurion continues to seek exoneration of wrongly convicted people through a thorough field investigation.

== Selected cases ==
=== Jorge De Los Santos ===
Newark, NJ. Convicted and sentenced to life in prison for the 1975 murder of a Newark, NJ used-car salesman, Jorge De Los Santos spent almost nine years in prison before being freed in July, 1983, by former US District Court Judge Frederick B. Lacey. The judge said testimony from a jailhouse witness that convicted De Los Santos "reeked of perjury" and that the prosecutor knew it. Centurion's investigation yielded the new evidence that freed De Los Santos."

=== Kerry Max Cook ===
Tyler, TX. In November, 1997, Kerry Max Cook was freed after spending nearly 20 years on death row for a murder in which he had no involvement. This was the crowning moment of a grueling seven-year effort by Centurion Ministries on Cook's behalf. Texas' highest court threw out the conviction and ruled that the state's "illicit manipulation of the evidence permeated the entire investigation of the murder" and that the state "gained a conviction based on fraud and ignored its own duty to seek the truth."

=== David Milgaard ===
Saskatoon, Canada. An order of the Canadian Supreme Court freed David Milgaard on April 16, 1992 after 23 years of imprisonment. Centurion's two-year investigation of the rape and murder case established the identity of the real killer. The Supreme Court recognized that "the continued conviction of Milgaard amounts to a miscarriage of justice." Subsequently, a 1997 DNA test of physical evidence confirmed Milgaard's innocence and resulted in the arrest of the actual killer.

=== Elmer "Geronimo" Pratt ===
Los Angeles, CA. In the late 1960s, Geronimo Pratt was the leader of the Los Angeles Black Panther Party. In 1972, Pratt was convicted of a 1968 murder on a Santa Monica, California tennis court. After 27 years of imprisonment and many denials of habeas corpus petitions, Pratt was granted a new trial and freed in June, 1997 by Orange County Superior Court Judge Everett Dickey. After conducting an extensive evidentiary hearing, Judge Dickey ruled that the state's primary witness was an FBI, LAPD, and Los Angeles County District Attorney informant who lied at trial. Pratt's exoneration was the culmination of a four-year effort by Centurion.

=== Darryl Burton ===
St. Louis, Mo. Based primarily on the account of a criminal informant for the St. Louis Police, Darryl Burton spent 24 years confined in Missouri prisons for the 1984 fatal shooting of Donald Bell at an Amoco gas station. The gas station cashier at the time of the shooting testified at a 2007 post-conviction hearing that she had told the police they had the wrong man. She stated that the shooter had a light complexion while Burton's complexion is very dark.

Exonerating Burton in August, 2008, the Cole County judge found the cashier's certainty that Mr. Burton was not the killer to be "clear, credible, and powerful." The judge also ruled that the informant's extensive criminal history was material and kept from the defense and would have provided "persuasive evidence of the defendant's innocence" had the jury known.

== News ==
- "Grisham awed by work of Centurion Ministries to free wrongly convicted inmates" The Trenton Times, 2010
- "The Exonerator" Miller-McCune, 2010
- "He helps innocent prisoners win their freedom" Christian Science Monitor, 2009
- "Finding Truth That May Set Someone Free" US1, 2009
- "Working to Save Innocent Souls" The Washington Post, 2008
- "McCloskey labors to exonerate innocent prisoners" The Star Ledger, 2008
- "Miracle Worker" American Way Magazine, 2006
