= Denis Parsons Burkitt =

Irish surgeon (1911–1993)

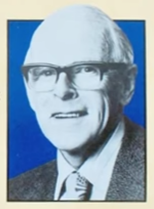
- Born: 28 February 1911; Enniskillen, Ireland
- Died: 23 March 1993 (aged 82); Gloucester, England
- Known for: Burkitt's lymphoma, Cancer
- Awards: Paul Ehrlich and Ludwig Darmstaedter Prize (1972); Charles S. Mott Prize (1982); Buchanan Medal (1992); Fellow of the Royal Society
- Scientific career
- Fields: Surgeon

Denis Parsons Burkitt CMG, MD, FRCS(Ed), FRS (28 February 1911 – 23 March 1993) was an Irish surgeon who made significant advances in health, such as the aetiology of a pediatric cancer, now called Burkitt's lymphoma, and the finding that rates of colorectal cancer are higher in those who eat limited dietary fibre.

== Biography ==
Burkitt was born in Enniskillen, County Fermanagh, Ireland. He was the son of James Parsons Burkitt, a civil engineer. Aged eleven he lost his right eye in an accident. He attended Portora Royal School in Enniskillen and Dean Close School, England. In 1929, Burkitt entered Trinity College, Dublin, to study engineering, but believing his evangelical calling was to be a doctor, he transferred to medicine and graduated in 1935. In 1938 he passed the Royal College of Surgeons of Edinburgh fellowship examinations. On 28 July 1943 he married Olive Rogers.

During the Second World War, Burkitt served with the Royal Army Medical Corps in England and later in Kenya and Somaliland. After the war, Burkitt decided his future lay in medical service in the developing world and he moved to Uganda. He eventually settled in Kampala and remained there until 1964.

Burkitt was president of the Christian Medical Fellowship and wrote frequently on religious/medical themes. Burkitt was awarded the CMG in the 1974 Birthday Honours. In 1979, he became an honorary fellow of Trinity College Dublin. He received the Bower Award and Prize in 1992. He died of a stroke on 23 March 1993 in Gloucester and was buried in Bisley, Gloucestershire, England.

== Scientific contributions ==
Burkitt made two major contributions to medical science related to his experience in Africa.

=== Burkitt's lymphoma ===
The first was the description, distribution, and ultimately, the aetiology of a pediatric cancer that bears his name, Burkitt's lymphoma.

Burkitt in 1957 observed a child with swellings in the angles of the jaw. "About two weeks later ... I looked out the window and saw another child with a swollen face ... and began to investigate these jaw tumours." "Having an intensely enquiring mind, Burkitt took the details of these cases to the records department ... which showed that jaw tumours were common, [and] were often associated with other tumours at unusual sites" in children in Uganda. He kept copious notes and concluded that these apparently different childhood cancers were all manifestations of a single type of malignancy. Burkitt published A sarcoma involving the jaws of African children. The newly identified cancer became known as "Burkitt's lymphoma". He went on to map the geographical distribution of the tumour. Burkitt, together with Dennis Wright, published a book titled Burkitt's Lymphoma in April 1970.

=== Dietary fibre ===
His second major contribution came when, on his return to Britain, Burkitt compared the pattern of diseases in African hospitals with Western diseases. He concluded that many Western diseases which were rare in Africa were the result of diet and lifestyle. He wrote a book, Don't Forget Fibre in your Diet, to Help Avoid Many of our Commonest Diseases'',, published in 1979 (Fourth Revision 1983), which became an international bestseller.

Burkitt suggested that higher fibre intake can reduce the risk of colorectal cancer. This was based on observations of the difference in patterns of diseases between Western and traditional African societies. Burkitt noted the lower rates of colorectal cancer in African countries compared to the West. He also found that African diets were generally higher in dietary fibre.

Recent research has found that "consuming 10 g more total dietary fibre a day is associated with an average 10% reduction in risk of colorectal cancer" and a diet high in dietary fibre is also advised as a precaution against other diseases such as heart disease and diabetes.

== Burkitt documentary ==
A 72 minute documentary film exploring the life of Denis Burkitt, as told by filmmaker Éanna Mac Cana, a survivor of Burkitt's lymphoma, was released in Ireland in July 2024.

== Publications ==
Academic journals

- Burkitt, D. P. (1972). "Varicose Veins, Deep Vein Thrombosis, and Haemorrhoids: Epidemiology and Suggested Aetiology". British Medical Journal. 2 (5813): 556–561. doi:10.1136/bmj.2.5813.556. PMC 1788140. PMID 5032782.
- Burkitt, D. P. (1973). "Some diseases characteristic of modern Western civilization". British Medical Journal. 1 (5848): 274–278. doi:10.1136/bmj.1.5848.274. PMC 1588096. PMID 4568142.
- Burkitt, D. P. (1981). "Hiatus hernia: Is it preventable?". The American Journal of Clinical Nutrition. 34 (3): 428–431. doi:10.1093/ajcn/34.3.428. PMID 6259926.

Books

- Burkitt, D. P.; Wright, D. H. (1970). Burkitt's Lymphoma. Livingstone. ISBN 0443007004. LCCN 72021505.
- Burkitt, D. P.; Trowell, H. C. (1981). Western diseases, their emergence and prevention. Cambridge: Harvard University Press. ISBN 978-0-674-95020-7.
- Kellock B, Burkitt D. P. The Fibre Man: The Life-story of Dr. Denis Burkitt: Lion Pub.; 1985.
