= William Burkitt (judge) =

Sir William Robert Burkitt (1838 – 16 June 1908) was an Irish judge in British India from the 1860s to the early 20th century.

== Education ==
From the Irish branch of a prominent family of judges, theologians, and doctors, Burkitt was born in Dublin. He was educated at Trinity College Dublin and called to the bar at Middle Temple.

He took the Indian Civil Service exams in 1860 and graduated to the Bengal Civil Service in 1869.

== Career ==
William Burkitt arrived in India on 11 October 1861. From October 1862, he served in the North Western Provinces as Assistant Magistrate and Collector, Joint Magistrate and Deputy Collector, District and Sessions Judge (from 1862 to 1891) in Gorakhpur, Basti, Banda, Cawnpore (or Kanpur), Bareilly, Muzaffarnagar, Saharanpur, Etawah, Azamgarh, and Mathura, and, later, as a Judicial Commissioner in locations such as Oudh, Allahabad, Delhi and Calcutta.

He served as a High Court Judge in Allahabad (1895–1908) and was appointed Chief Justice of the United Provinces and as Puisne Judge (1895), the most senior category of judges in British India.

He was made a Knight Bachelor on 19 July 1904, the year of his retirement.

== Freemasonry ==
Burkitt was District Grand Mark Master of District Grand Mark Lodge, Bengal and then District Grandmaster of Bengal, presiding over Freemasonry for over half of India's population in the Bengal Presidency.

=== Emir of Afghanistan ===
His most well-known achievement was, together with Lord Kitchener (then District Grandmaster of Punjab), to induct into masonry the Emir of Afghanistan Habibullah Khan at Freemasons Hall at Lodge Concordia in Park Street, Kolkata in 1907. This lodge is the home of the District Grand Lodge of Bengal of which Burkitt was District Grandmaster.

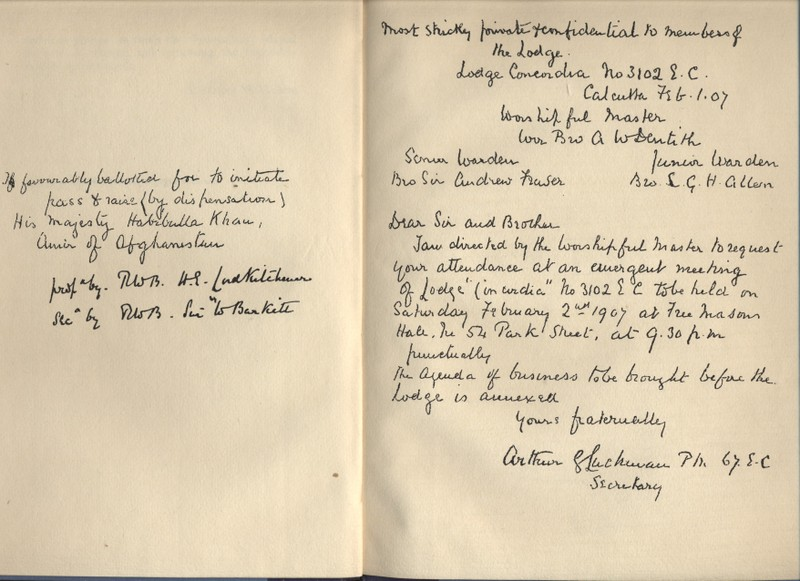
Induction of Emir Habibullah Khan IV of Afghanistan into masonry on 1 Feb 1907, by William Robert Burkitt and others.

An account of this highly unusual event was written at the time by Sir Henry McMahon. It was performed in an unusual style, the Emir taking all three ordinary degrees of masonry at once - a rare event rumoured to signify membership of the Roshaniya.

== Personal life ==
Burkitt was married twice. He married first to Kathleen Dwyer (who was lost at sea) and then to Frances Gill. He had children with both wives. His son, William (1872 – 1918), also a judge, was tipped to follow in his father's footsteps but died relatively young from pneumonia on 19 May 1918 in Nainital. There were several daughters, including Ethel Lilian Burkitt, who married in December 1902 Captain Charles Hampden Turner, Suffolk Regiment.

== Later life ==
He died at Norris's Hotel, 48-53 Russell Road, Kensington, London on 16 June 1908.
