= Thomas McPherson Brown =

American physician

Thomas McPherson Brown (1906–1989) was a rheumatologist who held unorthodox views about the basis of rheumatoid arthritis (RA), and believed it could be cured with antibiotics.

Brown graduated from Swarthmore College then attended Johns Hopkins Medical School. He did his medical residency at the hospital associated with the Rockefeller Institute.At Rockefeller he did research on synovial fluid from people with RA and in 1937 found Mycoplasma in the fluid from some patients, leading him to believe that RA might be an infectious disease. His work was interrupted by service in World War II; after the war he obtained a position at George Washington University and began to experimentally treat some people with RA with antibiotics, which at the time were a new class of drugs. Some of the people he treated were members of Congress or ambassadors, and some of them responded positively. He presented his work at a conference in 1949; at the same conference, the new drug cortisone was presented, and it overshadowed his work and became the leading treatment for RA.

Throughout his career, Brown fought to have his antibiotic treatments recognized by the medical establishment; they were not.
