= Francis Hassard Burkitt =

Irish Anglican priest

Francis Hassard Burkitt (1822–1894) was an Irish Anglican priest in the nineteenth century.

Burkitt was educated at Trinity College, Dublin. After curacies at Abbeyleix and Ballinasloe, he held incumbencies at Killinane and Cappoquin. He was a Prebendary of Kilmacduagh from 1862 to 1881; and Archdeacon of Clonfert from 1874 to 1882.
