= Biomedicine & Pharmacotherapy =

- Discipline: Pharmacology, medicine
- Language: English, French
- Edited by: D.M. Townsend

Publication details
- Former names: Biomédicine; Revue Européenne d'Études Cliniques et Biologiques; Revue Française d'Études Cliniques et Biologiques
- History: 1956-present
- Publisher: Elsevier
- Frequency: 12/year
- Impact factor: 7.5 (2021)

Standard abbreviations
- ISO 4: Biomed. Pharmacother.

Indexing
- CODEN: BIPHEX
- ISSN: 0753-3322 (print); 1950-6007 (web)
- LCCN: 83004344 sc 83004344
- OCLC no.: 08634158

Links
- Journal homepage; Online archive

Biomedicine & Pharmacotherapy is a peer-reviewed medical journal covering medical applications of pharmacology. It was established in 1956 and is published twelve times a year by Elsevier, which has been publishing the journal since 1988. The editor-in-chief is D.M. Townsend (Medical University of South Carolina). According to the Journal Citation Reports, the journal has a 2022 impact factor of 7.5.
