= List of people who have declined a British honour =

The following is a non-exhaustive list of people who have declined a British honour, such as a knighthood or other grade of honour.

In most cases, the offer of an honour was rejected privately. Nowadays, potential recipients are contacted before any public announcement to confirm in writing that they wish to be put forward for an honour, thereby avoiding friction or controversy. However, some have let it be known that the offer was declined, and there have also been occasional leaks from official sources. A handful of people have accepted and later renounced an honour; these are listed at the end of the article.

In 2003, The Sunday Times published a list of almost 300 people who had declined an honour between 1951 and 1999. In 2020, The Guardian reported based on a Freedom of Information request, that the number of people refusing an honour in 2020 was 68 out of 2,504 offered, or 2.7%. The number of people rejecting a British honour doubled in the decade 2010–2020.

== Reasons for rejection ==
Honours are rejected for a variety of reasons. Some potential recipients have rejected one honour then accepted another (such as Sir Alfred Hitchcock), or have initially refused an honour then accepted it, or have accepted one honour then declined another (such as actor Robert Morley) or refused in the hope of another higher distinction (Roald Dahl refused being decorated as an Officer of the Order of the British Empire, allegedly because he wanted a knighthood so that his wife Felicity would be entitled to be known as "Lady Dahl"; Felicity was herself appointed DBE in 2024).

Sometimes, a potential recipient refuses a knighthood or peerage but accepts an honour that does not bestow a title (or precedence), such as the Order of Merit or the Order of the Companions of Honour. Examples are E. M. Forster, Paul Scofield, Doris Lessing, Harold Pinter (although Pinter's widow, Lady Antonia Fraser, was later appointed a Dame Commander of the Order of the British Empire), David Hockney, Ralph Vaughan Williams, Augustus John, V. S. Srinivasa Sastri, Francis Crick and Paul Dirac.

Some may refuse an honour based on political reasons, relating to the British state or the royal family. Nationalists of the constituent countries may prefer awards from their respective nations, such as Welsh nationalists refusing British awards for Welsh awards such as from the Gorsedd or St David Awards. In 2022, when Gareth Bale accepted appointment as a Member of the Order of the British Empire, some Welsh football supporters opposed and criticised his decision, describing him as "no longer a Welsh legend" because of his acceptance. A columnist at The National, a Welsh-based newspaper, stated: "There is a duty to refuse honours from the current British state as a way of rejecting the colonial connotations of the gongs themselves."

== Honours declined ==
=== Kingdom ===
- In 1657, Oliver Cromwell, already Head of State and Head of Government as Lord Protector, was offered the crown by Parliament as part of a revised constitutional settlement; he had been "instrumental" in abolishing the monarchy after the English Civil War. Cromwell agonised for six weeks over the offer. In a speech on 13 April 1657, he gave his opinion that the office of monarch, once abolished, should stay so: "I would not seek to set up that which Providence hath destroyed and laid in the dust, and I would not build Jericho again."

=== Dukedom ===
- Sir Winston Churchill, Prime Minister, was twice offered a dukedom, once as Duke of Dover by George VI and another as Duke of London by Queen Elizabeth II, but declined both in order to remain in the House of Commons and to allow his son Randolph a political career. Randolph died only three years after his father, so the dukedom would have had little time to affect his career as he had already been out of the Commons for ten years.
- Benjamin Disraeli, 1st Earl of Beaconsfield, Prime Minister (1880); had already been created Earl of Beaconsfield.
- Edward Smith-Stanley, 14th Earl of Derby, Prime Minister (1868); citing his preference to continue being "the 14th Earl of Derby".
- Henry Petty-Fitzmaurice, 3rd Marquess of Lansdowne, statesman (1857).
- Robert Gascoyne-Cecil, 3rd Marquess of Salisbury, Prime Minister (1886, and 1892 and possibly in 1901) – citing the prohibitive cost of the lifestyle that dukes were expected to maintain. According to Scribner's Magazine in 1900, "It is true that the Marquis of Salisbury might have been a Duke if he had not regarded his marquisate as a prouder title than a new dukedom could furnish."
- Prince Louis of Battenberg (1917) during the First World War, when he was forced to renounce his German title of prince. Offered a dukedom by George V, but declined as he could not afford the lavish lifestyle expected of a duke; accepted the marquessate of Milford Haven instead.
- Maria Fitzherbert, mistress and wife (in a marriage never considered valid under English law) of George IV; his brother William IV, hearing her story after George's death, asked her to accept a dukedom but she refused, asking only permission to wear widow's weeds, and to dress her servants in royal livery.

=== Marquessate ===
- Sir Alexander Cambridge, formerly Prince Alexander of Teck (1917); accepted the Earldom of Athlone instead.
- Henry Lascelles, 5th Earl of Harewood (1922); he reportedly held the belief that marquessates tended to die out more quickly than earldoms.
- John Spencer, 5th Earl Spencer (1890s).

=== Earldom ===
- Henry Addington (on his retirement as Prime Minister declined the Earldom of Banbury in 1804 as he wished to remain in the Commons; later accepted the Viscountcy of Sidmouth).
- Leo Amery, politician (declined in 1945).
- Sir Henry Campbell-Bannerman (declined the Earldom of Belmont in 1905 when it was offered to him in a plot to elevate him to the House of Lords and make him an ineffective Prime Minister in the Relugas Compact).
- Arthur Balfour, former prime minister (in 1919, accepted the Earldom of Balfour in 1922).
- Basil Brooke, 1st Viscount Brookeborough, politician (1963)
- R. A. Butler, politician (in 1964; accepted life peerage as Baron Butler of Saffron Walden in 1965).
- Henry Carey, 1st Baron Hunsdon, declined the Earldom of Wiltshire on his death bed in 1596.
- Neville Chamberlain (on his retirement as prime minister in 1940, also declined appointment as KG).
- Henry Dundas, 1st Viscount Melville, PC, politician (in 1809).
- Sir Anthony Eden (on his retirement as prime minister in 1957; later accepted the Earldom of Avon in 1961).
- William Ewart Gladstone, prime minister (in 1885).
- William Legge, had also declined a knighthood; his son was created Baron Dartmouth instead.
- Harold Macmillan (on his retirement as prime minister in 1963; later accepted the Earldom of Stockton in 1984).
- Angus Ogilvy (in 1963, upon his marriage to Princess Alexandra of Kent; later accepted a knighthood in 1988).
- Mark Phillips (in 1973, upon his marriage to Princess Anne; accepted appointment as CVO in 1974).
- R. H. Tawney (twice declined an earldom, in 1920s and 1940s. Replied to Ramsay MacDonald's offer by asking what harm he had ever done the Labour Party, and to the offer from Clement Attlee he averred that he was surprised that Labour was still interested in such baubles).

=== Viscountcy ===
- Charles Booth, disenchanted with politics, declined Gladstone's overtures; created a Privy Counsellor by Balfour in 1904.
- John Grigg, 2nd Baron Altrincham, writer, historian and politician.
- Arthur Henderson, declined offer of peerage by Ramsay MacDonald in 1931.
- John Henry Whitley, retiring Speaker of the House of Commons (in 1928).

=== Barony ===
- George Macaulay Booth, director of the Bank of England; declined Lloyd George's offer.
- Samuel Courtauld, industrialist (1937)
- Leonard Knight Elmhirst, philanthropist; declined Clement Attlee's offer in 1946, replying: "My own work, however, as you know, has lain in the main among country people ... in India, the USA and in Devonshire ... acceptance would neither be easy for me to explain nor easy for my friends to comprehend."
- Sir Thomas Holderness, retiring Permanent Under-Secretary of State for India, refused in 1920 on financial grounds, although he accepted a baronetcy.
- Billy Hughes, prime minister of Australia; declined David Lloyd George's offer in 1916.
- Admiral Lord Louis Mountbatten. Offered in 1945 for his services as Supreme Allied Commander, South East Asia Command; declined as both Field Marshals Harold Alexander and Bernard Montgomery had accepted viscountcies. He received a viscountcy in the 1946 Birthday Honours, followed by an earldom for his service as the last Viceroy of India in August 1947.
- Sir Alan Lascelles, Private Secretary to the Sovereign; declined in 1953 as he felt titles to be a show of self-importance.
- T. P. O'Connor, journalist and Irish Nationalist MP 1880–1929, declined the offer from Lloyd George.
- Frank Pick, Chief Executive of London Transport in the 1930s.
- Joseph Strutt, soldier and MP, declined all honours, but suggested the offer (of the barony of Rayleigh) be transferred to his wife instead, which was done.

=== Life peerage (barony) ===
Former Prime Ministers of the United Kingdom

Life peerages are customarily offered to all former British prime ministers when they step down as a Member of Parliament (MPs). The last former prime minister to accept a peerage was Theresa May in 2024 after announcing her decision to step down from the House of Commons at that year's general election. Prior to May, the last former prime minister to accept a peerage upon leaving the Commons was Margaret Thatcher in 1992, and her husband, Denis, was created a baronet. David Cameron did not accept a life peerage when he stepped down from the Commons in 2016, but when appointed Foreign Secretary in 2023 he accepted appointment in order to serve in that role. Three of her successors – John Major, Tony Blair and Gordon Brown – declined a peerage, whilst Rishi Sunak continues to serve as MPs. Neither Boris Johnson, Keir Starmer (who both resigned from the Commons), nor Liz Truss (who lost re-election in 2024) has been offered a peerage.

- Sir Edward Heath, in 2001. Remaining in the House of Commons for more than 25 years after his premiership, Heath personally disapproved of political honours while realising their usefulness as a source of political patronage.
- Sir John Major, in 2001. Major thought a seat in the House of Lords was incompatible with retiring from politics; he later accepted appointment as Knight Companion of the Garter.
- Sir Tony Blair, in 2007. Blair stated that the House of Lords was "not my sort of thing". In 1999, Blair's government had significantly reduced the size of the House of Lords. Later, akin to Sir John Major, Blair accepted the Garter in the 2022 New Year Honours.
- Gordon Brown, in 2015. Brown declined on principle, being an advocate for an elected upper house. Brown was made a Member of the Order of the Companions of Honour in the 2024 Birthday Honours.

Others

- Isaiah Berlin, OM, philosopher (in 1980).
- Rodney Bickerstaffe, trade union leader and socialist; General Secretary of UNISON. Declined Blair's offer in 2000, reportedly saying that to accept would betray his socialist beliefs.
- Mark Bonham Carter Liberal politician, in 1967
- Albert Booth, Labour MP and Cabinet Minister 1974–1979
- John Cleese, film and television actor, comedian (in 1999; stated that he "did not wish to spend winters in England" and being a peer would be "ridiculous", had previously declined appointment as CBE in 1996).
- Constance Cummings, actress, in 1975
- Jean Floud, sociologist, Nuffield College, Oxford. Principal of Newnham College, Cambridge, declined a peerage (in 1978).
- Michael Foot, former Labour Party Leader.
- John Freeman, Labour MP, journalist, broadcaster, diplomat, and businessman.
- Jim (James) Griffiths, Labour MP, first Welsh secretary.
- Geoffrey Goodman, journalist.
- Ray Gunter, Labour politician, President of TSSA union; MP for Southwark; Cabinet minister 1964–70, declined offer in 1972,
- Joe Haines, Press Secretary Prime Minister Harold Wilson 1964–1970
- Margaret Herbison, Labour politician (in 1976)
- Arthur Holt, Liberal MP for Bolton East, declined peerage in 1967
- Thomas Jackson, trade union leader, 1979.
- Jack Jones, trade union leader, on several occasions, as he advocated the abolition of the House of Lords.
- Ludovic Kennedy, author and journalist, declined offer by the Liberal Party in 1967
- Bruce Millan, Labour MP; Secretary of State for Scotland 1976–1979; EU Commissioner.
- Cardinal Cormac Murphy-O'Connor, Roman Catholic Archbishop Emeritus of Westminster (in 2009; reportedly on advice from the Holy See due to concerns that it would compromise the Church's impartiality and a prohibition in canon law on priests holding political office).
- Stan Newens, Labour MP for Harlow; declined a proposed peerage from Michael Foot in 1983.
- Sir Laurence Olivier, stage and film actor, inaugural Director of the National Theatre; declined a peerage in 1967; he accepted a similar offer in 1970
- John Pardoe, Liberal Democrat MP, declined offer of a peerage in 1976 because he thought it was an absurd anomaly in a democratic system.
- Enoch Powell, Conservative and Ulster Unionist MP.
- J. B. Priestley, novelist and playwright (in 1965).
- Sir Joseph Robinson, 1st Baronet, a South African mining magnate, declined a peerage in 1922 after controversy arose regarding his nomination, which was given in exchange for political contributions.
- J. K. Rowling, author and philanthropist, declined offers of a peerage from both Labour and Conservative governments.
- Norman Willis, General Secretary, Trades Union Congress.
- George Woodcock, General Secretary TUC, accepted appointment as CBE.
- Tony Woodley, former General Secretary of Unite, initially turned down two offers of a peerage in 2018 and August 2020, before accepting in November 2020.

As part of the 1999 House of Lords reform, members of the Royal Family with first-creation peerages were offered life peerages as a formality. While this would have granted them the right to sit in the House, it was widely expected they would decline; ultimately, all did so except for Antony Armstrong-Jones, 1st Earl of Snowdon. These included:

- Prince Philip, Duke of Edinburgh
- Charles, Prince of Wales (later Charles III)
- Prince Andrew, Duke of York (later Andrew Mountbatten-Windsor)
- Prince Edward, Earl of Wessex (later Duke of Edinburgh)

=== Baronetcy ===
- Charles Babbage, scientist, declined both a knighthood and baronetcy.
- Hall Caine, novelist and playwright (1917); accepted knighthood in 1918.
- George Peabody, philanthropist (1864); Queen Victoria sent an adoring letter of thanks, enclosing a miniature portrait of herself and offering him a baronetcy or knighthood; Peabody declined both titles.
- John Grubb Richardson, declined, citing his religious beliefs.
- Alfred Tennyson, poet (1865 and 1868); accepted peerage as Baron Tennyson in 1884 on William Ewart Gladstone's urging.

Beyond these instances, many baronetcies have been effectively declined. As a hereditary honour that the Crown historically used to raise funds from the landed gentry, a baronetcy may be left dormant if an heir chooses not to register the necessary proofs of succession upon the previous holder's death. However, the title can be revived at any time—for instance, by a grandson—provided the required documentation is produced.

As of December 2017, approximately 208 baronetcies remain unproven and unclaimed.

=== Knight Companion of the Order of the Garter ===
- Neville Chamberlain was offered the Garter shortly before his death in 1940, but felt too sick to accept.
- William Ewart Gladstone was offered the Garter upon leaving office at the end of his first premiership in February 1874 but declined both the Garter and a peerage.
- William Lamb, 2nd Viscount Melbourne, declined the Garter around 1847 because he feared the expense of an investiture. His last years were plagued by largely imaginary money worries that surfaced after his stroke.
- Harold Macmillan declined the Garter in March 1964, as he felt it should only be conferred for service during a national crisis, privately remarking that acceptance would have given him "the substance without the shadow" (later appointed OM in 1976 and created Earl of Stockton in 1984).
- Charles Vincent Massey felt compelled to refuse the Garter due to the Canadian Government's policy on peerages and knighthoods; he accepted the Royal Victorian Chain in 1960.

=== Knight of the Order of the Thistle ===
- Ramsay MacDonald declined the Thistle in 1935 as he felt accepting would go against his principles as a member of the Labour Party.

=== Knight of the Order of St Patrick ===
- George Ponsonby O'Callaghan, 2nd Viscount Lismore was nominated a Knight of the Order of St Patrick in 1864, but declined the honour.

=== Knighthood (Knight Bachelor) ===
- T. S. Ashton, economic historian, Professor of Economic History, University of London (in 1957).
- Frank Auerbach, artist, declined knighthood in 2003.
- Peter Benenson, founder of Amnesty International; was offered several times, but refused on each occasion, citing human rights abuses in which the British government was complicit.
- Alan Bennett, playwright (in 1996; had previously declined appointment as CBE in 1988).
- Arnold Bennett, novelist, declined knighthood offered for service in running the British government's French propaganda department during World War I.
- Henry Benyon, Lord Lieutenant of Berkshire, declined knighthood in 1956. Accepted a baronetcy in 1958.
- Ernest Bevin, trade unionist and Foreign Secretary, Labour government 1945 (in 1935)
- David Bowie, musician (in 2003; also declined CBE in 2000).
- Danny Boyle, theatre and film director (in 2013). Later he stated that he believed "in being an equal citizen rather than a preferred subject" and that "that sort of thing just makes me vomit."
- Lester Brain, aviator and airline executive (in late 1960s; later accepted appointment as an Officer of the Order of Australia in 1979).
- Alick Buchanan-Smith, Conservative MP in 1974
- Frank Chapple, trade unionist in 1980, accepted a life peerage in 1985.
- Joseph Conrad, novelist
- Francis Crick, physicist, co-discoverer of the structure of DNA; was also offered a CBE in 1963, but did not accept it. Later accepted appointment to the Order of Merit.
- Hugh Cudlipp, newspaper editor (1966). He accepted a life peerage in 1974.
- Henry Rees Davies (in 1935).
- Arthur Deakin, trade unionist (in 1947)
- Bill Deedes, journalist and Conservative politician, declined a Kt in 1973. He accepted a life peerage in 1986 and was appointed Knight Commander in 1999.
- Paul Dirac, scientist, declined a knighthood in 1953, reportedly in part due to his dislike of being addressed by his first name, but probably had egalitarian objections to titles; finally accepted appointment to the Order of Merit in 1973 as it was not a title.
- George Doughty, trade union leader, in 1975
- Bernie Ecclestone, businessman and Formula One boss. He stated in a 2019 interview that while he was glad if he had done some good, this was not his main intention when setting out in business, so he did not feel he deserved an honour.
- Huw T. Edwards, Welsh trade unionist and Welsh Labour politician. Uncomfortable with honours, Edwards refused a knighthood on at least two occasions in subsequent years. He had previously accepted appointment as MBE, later renouncing it.
- Lionel Elvin, educationalist and academic in 1964
- Michael Faraday, scientist, who, for much of his life, eschewed worldly honours, turning down a knighthood and twice refusing to become president of the Royal Society.
- Harry Ferguson, businessman, engineer and inventor; twice offered and declined knighthood in the last ten years of his life; in response to a letter from Winston Churchill offering to submit his name, Ferguson declined on the ground that knighthoods should be reserved for servicemen and statesmen, whose financial rewards were relatively small, and should not be given to businessmen or industrialists with financial wealth.
- Albert Finney, actor (in 2000; had previously declined CBE in 1980).
- E. M. Forster, author and essayist; declined knighthood in 1949, but accepted appointment as Member of the Order of the Companions of Honour in the 1953 New Year Honours list and appointment to the Order of Merit in 1969.
- Michael Frayn, novelist and dramatist; declined a knighthood in the 2003 New Year Honours and a CBE four years previously; Frayn stated: "I haven't done this for reasons of modesty. I like the name 'Michael Frayn'; it's a nice little name to run around with. I've spent 70 years getting used to it and I don't want to change it now."
- John Freeman, politician, journalist, diplomat, business executive. Also declined a peerage.
- John Galsworthy, playwright, declined knighthood in 1918 New Year Honours, but accepted appointment to the Order of Merit in 1929 as it was not a title.
- Harley Granville Barker, playwright
- Graham Greene, novelist
- Lawrence Gowing, artists and academic in 1979
- John Winthrop Hackett, Australian newspaper owner (in 1902); turned down a knighthood after it was gazetted in 1902, but accepted it in 1911.
- J. S. Haldane, scientist and academic in 1926
- Herbert Lionel Hart, Professor of Jurisprudence Oxford, in 1966 as he believed state honours should only be given for exceptional public service.
- Stanford G. Haughton, sound recordist/musician (in 1952).
- Stephen Hawking CH CBE, physicist, reportedly turned down a knighthood because he "does not like titles."
- Bill Hayden, Governor-General of Australia.
- Patrick Heron, artist, declined a knighthood allegedly over the education policy of the government in the 1980s.
- Peter Higgs, CH, physicist, Professor of Theoretical Physics, University of Edinburgh; co-discoverer of the Higgs boson in 1999, because he felt honours are used for political purposes by the government. He later accepted appointment to the Order of the Companions of Honour, because he was (wrongly) assured that it was the personal gift of the Queen, in 2013.
- Keith Hill, Labour MP; declined knighthood in 2010 Dissolution Honours, stating: "My fundamental reason is that I have never had the least desire to have a title. I don't want to be discourteous, but I find the whole idea a little embarrassing and too much for me."
- David Hockney, CH RA, artist (in 1990; accepted appointment as CH in 1997, and OM in 2012 because they are not titles).
- Edward Lewis Hopkins (aka Ted Hopkins), refused in 1919.
- Anthony Hurd, Conservative politician, in 1956, accepted in 1959
- Marmaduke Hussey, declined knighthood in 1990 but accepted a life peerage in 1996 as Baron Hussey of North Bradley.
- Aldous Huxley, author (in 1959).
- Muhammad Ali Jinnah, founder of Pakistan; offered a knighthood in 1925, he replied: "I prefer to be plain Mr Jinnah".
- Augustus John, initially refused an Order of Merit in 1942 and later refused a knighthood.
- Rudyard Kipling, writer, and poet; declined knighthood in 1899 and again in 1903; his wife stated that Kipling felt he could "do his work better without it". Kipling also declined the Order of Merit in 1921 and again in 1924. Kipling expressed his own view on the importance of titles and poetry in his poem "The Last Rhyme of True Thomas".
- T. E. Lawrence, Arabist, archaeologist, soldier; George V offered Lawrence a knighthood on 30 October 1918 at a private audience in Buckingham Palace for his services in the Arab Revolt, but he declined. He was unwilling to accept the honour due to his anger over the Sykes-Picot Agreement.
- Essington Lewis, Australian mining magnate.
- Edgar Lobel, Romanian-British classicist and papyrologist; (in 1955).
- L. S. Lowry, artist (in 1968; had previously declined appointment as OBE in 1955 and CBE in 1961; later twice declined appointment as CH (1972, 1976); holds the record for the most honours declined).
- Humphrey Lyttleton, jazz musician and broadcaster (in 1995).
- Arthur Henry Mann, editor of The Yorkshire Post, declined two knighthoods in the 1920s on the basis that accepting would interfere with his journalism; upon retirement he became a Member of the Order of the Companions of Honour.
- Kingsley Martin, journalist and successful editor of the New Statesman reaching its highest circulation in the 1930s and 1940s. He declined the 'honour' in 1965 because he strongly disapproved of the honours system, certainly for journalists.
- John Loudon McAdam, Scottish road builder.
- Neil MacGregor, director of the British Museum (in 1999); in 2010 he accepted appointment to the Order of Merit, the personal gift of the British monarch.
- John Mackie, Baron John-Mackie, Labour politician (in 1980)
- Malcolm McDowell, actor (in 1995; also declined CBE in 1984).
- Michael Meacher, Labour politician
- James Meade, economist, civil servant, and academic. Economic Adviser to the Treasury 1945–51; Professor of Economics at LSE; Nobel Prize in Economics 1977.
- Henry Moore, sculptor in 1951
- Robert Morley, actor and dramatist. Declined 1975.
- Stanley Morison, typographer (in 1953).
- Robert Neild, economic adviser Labour government 1964–67. Professor of Economics, Cambridge University
- Michael Oakeshott, political philosopher in 1981
- Peter O'Toole, film and stage actor.
- William Owen, portrait painter for the Prince of Wales, in 1813.
- William Pember Reeves, New Zealand politician, declined knighthood three times, including GCMG.
- Max Perutz, scientist, Nobel Prize for Chemistry 1962 (in 1970)
- Frank Pick, chief executive of London Transport (also declined a peerage).
- Harold Pinter, playwright
- John Piper, artist, declined a Kt in 1964.
- Anthony Powell, novelist, earlier accepted appointment as CBE and later as OM.
- William Poel, actor and Shakespearean director. Declined a knighthood twice.
- J. B. Priestley, playwright and novelist.
- J. Arthur Rank, businessman and film producer (The Rank Organisation) in 1949
- Frank Russell, judge (1919); on the grounds that as the son of a peer he outranked a knight bachelor. Accepted a law life peerage as Baron Russell of Killowen in 1929.
- Simon Sainsbury, businessman in 1992
- Frederick Sanger scientist, Nobel Prize for Chemistry 1958 and 1980
- B. A. Santamaria, Australian Catholic social campaigner.
- Amartya Sen, economist and Nobel Prize winner.
- George Bernard Shaw, playwright, critic, and socialist; also declined OM.
- Paul Scofield, actor, declined offer three times: in 1968, 1974, and 1987.
- Quentin Skinner, historian; Regius Professor of Modern History, University of Cambridge; republican (in 1996).
- Wilson Steer, artist in 1930
- A. J. P. Taylor, historian, probably due to anti-Establishment views, e.g. "The Establishment draws its recruits from outside as soon as they are ready to conform to its standards and become respectable. There is nothing more agreeable in life than to make peace with the Establishment – and nothing so corrupting."
- Ian Taylor, oil company executive.
- Ted Verity, editor Daily Mail.
- Graham Wallas, social scientist (in 1930)
- Benjamin West, American-born painter.
- Glanville Williams (in 1980), Welsh legal scholar.
- Ralph Vaughan Williams, composer; accepted appointment to the Order of Merit in 1935.
- J. Steven Watson, historian, declined offer of knighthood twice, in 1960 while at Oxford, and after becoming Principal of St. Andrews University 1966
- Patrick White, Australian writer, Nobel Prize for Literature (1970).
- John Walpole Willis, colonial judge, barrister and author, refused a knighthood at least twice.
- John Henry Whitley, Liberal MP and Speaker of the House of Commons
- Norman Willis, general secretary of the Trades Union Congress; "turned down a knighthood offered to him by John Major, just as he had turned aside a proposal from the Labour leader John Smith that he might consider going into the House of Lords".
- George Woodcock General Secretary TUC, in 1965
- Bill Woodfull, Australian cricketer; turned down offer of a knighthood for services to cricket in 1934, but accepted appointment as OBE for services to education in 1963 which he saw as more important work than playing cricket.
- John Zachary Young, neurophysiologist

=== Appointment to the Order of the Bath ===
==== As Knight Grand Cross (GCB) ====
- Thomas Carlyle in 1874

==== As Knight Companion (KB) ====
- Philip Stanhope, 4th Earl of Chesterfield, in 1725; he later accepted the Garter in 1730.
- Admiral George Cranfield Berkeley in 1812; hoping to be elevated to the peerage, he then settled for KB in 1813, being promoted GCB in 1815.

=== Appointment to the Order of Merit (OM) ===
- W. H. Auden, poet.
- A. E. Housman, poet and classical scholar (in 1929).
- Rudyard Kipling.
- George Bernard Shaw, playwright, critic, and polemicist (in 1946; Shaw replied that "merit" in authorship could only be determined by the posthumous verdict of history). Shaw had wanted to decline the Nobel Prize for Literature in 1925, but accepted it at his wife's behest as honouring Ireland. He did not reject the monetary award, requesting it be used to finance translation of Swedish books into English.
- H. G. Wells, writer (temp. George V).

=== Appointment to the Order of the Star of India ===
==== As Knight Commander (KCSI) ====
- V. S. Srinivasa Sastri (in 1928; accepted appointment as Member of the Order of the Companions of Honour (CH) in 1930).
- V. P. Menon (in 1948; official reason for declining was that with Indian independence, he had entered the service of the new Indian government. According to his grandson, however, his actual reason for declining was that he could not accept a knighthood for having caused the partition of his country).

=== Appointment to the Order of St Michael and St George ===
==== As Knight Grand Cross Commander (GCMG) ====
- Faimalaga Luka, Governor-General and Prime Minister of Tuvalu.

==== As Knight Commander (KCMG) ====
- Clive Baillieu, 1st Baron Baillieu, businessman (1944)
- Alfred Deakin, future prime minister of Australia (1887).
- Philip Fysh, Tasmanian politician (1891). Later accepted the knighthood in 1896.
- George Trefgarne, 1st Baron Trefgarne, politician (1951).

==== As a Companion (CMG) ====
- Paikiasothy Saravanamuttu, Ceylonese civil servant (1946).

=== Appointment to the Order of the Indian Empire ===
==== As a Companion (CIE) ====
- Narayan Malhar Joshi (1879–1955), Member of the Bombay Corporation (1919–1922) and Indian Legislative Assembly; delegate to the ILO and Round Table Conferences (refused in 1921, on the grounds he was too poor for the honour).

=== Appointment to the Royal Victorian Order ===
==== As a Knight Commander (KCVO) ====
- Walter Hore-Ruthven, 10th Lord Ruthven of Freeland, General Officer Commanding London District 1924–28, after his daughters (the Ruthven Twins) were refused entry to the Royal Enclosure at Ascot on account of their being actresses.

==== As a Commander (CVO) ====
- Craig Murray, former United Kingdom Ambassador to Uzbekistan (had previously declined appointments as LVO and OBE), in 1999, for reasons of Scottish nationalism and republicanism.

=== Appointment as a Member of the Order of the Companions of Honour (CH) ===
- W. H. Auden, poet
- Francis Bacon, artist (in 1977; previously declined appointment as CBE in 1960).
- Harley Granville-Barker, actor (1938), also declined a knighthood.
- Leonard Cheshire, war hero and charity administrator, declined CH in 1975, but accepted appointment as OM in 1981 and was created a life peer in 1991.
- Robert Graves, poet and novelist (in 1984; had previously declined appointment as CBE in 1957).
- Edward Heath Conservative politician and Prime Minister 1970–74 (declined CH in 1975)
- L. S. Lowry RA, artist (in 1972 and 1976; had previously declined appointment as OBE in 1955 and CBE in 1961 and a knighthood in 1968; holds the record for the most honours declined).
- Ben Nicholson, artist (in 1965). He accepted appointment to the Order of Merit in 1968.
- Philip Noel-Baker, former Secretary of State for Commonwealth Relations, 1965 New Year Honours (accepted a life peerage in 1977).
- Michael Oakeshott, political philosopher, also declined a knighthood.
- J. B. Priestley, writer (in 1969) also refused a knighthood and a peerage (accepted appointment as OM in 1977).
- Leonard Woolf, writer/publisher (in 1966).
- Virginia Woolf, writer. 'I don't take honours' (Diary 6 April 1933). She also declined honorary degrees and other awards ('all that humbug'), but accepted a few literary prizes.

=== Appointment to the Order of the British Empire ===
==== As a Knight Grand Cross (GBE) ====
- Charles Wilson, 1st Baron Moran (in 1962) – offered for services as chairman of a government committee but declined, commenting it was "the sort of thing given to civil servants".
- Sir Harry Shackleton (in the 1951 Birthday Honours List).

==== As a Knight Commander (KBE) ====
- Richard Lambert, former editor of The Financial Times (2002) (accepted a kighthood in 2011 for service to business)
- T. E. Lawrence, Arabist, archaeologist, soldier, aircraftsman, writer (in October 1918).
- Calouste Gulbenkian, philanthropist (in 1951 New Year Honours).
- John Hubert Penson CB CMG MC, botanist.

==== As a Dame Commander (DBE) ====
- Doris Lessing, CH, author, Nobel Prize for Literature (declined DBE in 1992, stating it was in the name of a non-existent Empire, having also declined appointment as OBE in 1977; accepted appointment as CH as it does not accord a title, in 2000).
- Geraldine McEwan, actress (in 2002; had previously declined appointment as OBE in 1986).
- Eleanor Rathbone, politician and social reformer (in 1949)
- Vanessa Redgrave, actress (accepted appointment as CBE in 1967; declined damehood in 1999, but accepted it in 2022).
- Bridget Riley, artist (accepted appointment as CH and CBE).
- J. K. Rowling, CH OBE, author and philanthropist, declined promotion as DBE and elevation to the peerage but accepted appointment as CH in 2017.
- Dorothy Wedderburn, academic, Principal of Royal Holloway and Bedford College London, 1980–90.

==== As a Commander (CBE) ====
- Richard Ithamar Aaron, philosopher, professor of philosophy, University College of Wales, Aberystwyth (in 1962 Birthday Honours).
- Ian Bronson Albery, theatre producer (2003).
- W. Godfrey Allen, architect; Surveyor of the Fabric of Gloucester Cathedral (in 1957).
- Martin Amis, novelist.
- Nick Anstee, former Lord Mayor of London (in 2010).
- Francis Bacon, artist (in 1960;. later declined appointment as CH in 1977).
- J. G. Ballard, author (in 2003): "the honours system is a Ruritanian charade that helps to prop up the top-heavy monarchy.".
- Julian Barnes, novelist.
- Jim Baty, trade unionist, General Secretary of ASLEF 1946–1952 (in 1952).
- Wilfred Beard, General Secretary, United Patternmakers' Association (in 1959).
- Clive Bell, art critic (in 1953).
- Alan Bennett, playwright (in 1988; later declined a knighthood in 1996).
- Honor Blackman, actress (in 2002; she was a republican).
- David Bowie, musician (in 2000; declined a knighthood in 2003)
- Francis Boyd, The Guardian journalist, in 1967; accepted a knighthood in 1976.
- John Carey, academic and literary critic.
- Robert Carvel, political journalist in 1982
- Julie Christie, film actress.
- John Cleese, actor/comedian (in 1996; he reportedly thought it was "silly", and later declined a life peerage).
- Prunella Clough, painter (in 1979;. previously declined OBE in 1968).
- John Cole, journalist, latterly BBC Political Editor (in 1993).
- David Cornwell (uses John le Carré as pen name), author.
- Francis Crick, scientist, co-discoverer of the structure of DNA (in 1963; later also refused a knighthood, but finally accepted appointment as OM in 1991).
- Andrew Davies, Welsh writer of screenplays and novels, best known for House of Cards and A Very Peculiar Practice, and his adaptations of Vanity Fair, Pride and Prejudice, Middlemarch, Bleak House and War & Peace (in 1982).
- Elwyn Davies, Welsh university and cultural administrator, civil servant, writer and academic.
- Alastair Dunnett, journalist and businessman (in 1979) He accepted a knighthood in 1995.
- Bernie Ecclestone, owner of Formula One commercial rights (in 1996).
- Brian Eno, musician (in 2007)
- Owen Ellis Evans (Reverend), sponsor of New Testament bible in Welsh (in 1976).
- Peter Finch, film and stage actor.
- Albert Finney, actor (in 1980; also declined a knighthood in 2000).
- Philippa Foot, philosopher (in 1994)
- C. S. Forester, novelist (in 1953).
- Michael Frayn novelist and dramatist (in 1989; later declined a knighthood in 2003).
- Stephen Frears, film director.
- Lucian Freud, artist (in 1977; later accepted appointment as CH in 1983, and OM in 1993).
- Jack Gallagher, historian, Beit Professor of Commonwealth History, Oxford.
- Robert Graves, poet and novelist (in 1957; later declined appointment as CH in 1984).
- Graham Greene, author (in 1956) (later accepted appointment as CH and OM, neither of which are titles granting rank or precedence).
- Trevor Griffiths, playwright.
- John Gross, author, literary critic and journalist.
- R. Geraint Gruffydd (in 1964).
- Claude Herbert Grundy, Queen's Remembrancer (in 1964).
- Jocelyn Herbert, stage designer (in 1981 and 1999).
- Trevor Howard, film and stage actor (in 1982).
- Elgar Howarth, conductor and composer (2001).
- John Ireland, composer (in 1959).
- Gus John, writer and education campaigner (in 2000).
- Leon Kossoff, painter (1999).
- Walter Lassally, cinematographer.
- T. E. Lawrence, World War I British Army officer, archaeologist, Arabist, RAF aircraftsman, and writer, popularly known as "Lawrence of Arabia"; later declined a knighthood.
- F. R. Leavis, literary critic. Refused in 1966; but later accepted appointment as CH.
- James Lees-Milne, writer and expert on English country houses and long-time associate of the National Trust (in 1993).
- C. S. Lewis, author, theologian, Oxford professor (in 1951, declined in order to avoid association with any political issues).
- Ken Livingstone, former Mayor of London, due to be honoured for his services to the 2012 Olympics (turned down an honour in the 2013 New Year Honours due to his belief that politicians should not get such awards).
- L. S. Lowry, artist (in 1961; had previously declined appointment as OBE in 1955; declined a knighthood in 1968, and later appointment as CH in 1972 and 1976; holds the record for the most honours declined).
- Philip MacDonald, author (in 1952); he thought the honours system added to the class-ridden nature of English society.
- Malcolm McDowell, actor (in 1984; later declined a knighthood in 1995).
- George Melly, musician, writer, critic, artist and raconteur (in 2001).
- Mary Midgley, philosopher.
- Helen Mirren, actress (in 1996; accepted a damehood in 2003)
- Stanley Morison (in 1962; also declined a knighthood).
- VS Naipaul, author (in 1977; accepted a knighthood in 1990)
- Ben Nicholson, artist (in 1955; later declined appointment as CH in 1965).
- Seán O'Casey, playwright (in 1963).
- Lionel Penrose, Professor of Medical Genetics, University College London, 1945–65 (in 1967).
- Edith Pretty, benefactor (sometime in period 1940–1942)
- Cedric Price, architect (2003).
- Leon Radzinowicz criminologist in 1964, later accepted a knighthood in 1970.
- Karel Reisz, Czech-born film director.
- Tony Richardson, film and theatre director (in 1987).
- Alan Rickman, film and stage actor (in 2008).
- Andrew Robertson, Professor of Mechanical Engineering University of Bristol (in 1965); reportedly disapproved of the honours system.
- Ronald Robinson, historian (in 1953) later Beit Professor of Commonwealth History, Oxford.
- Paul Rogers, stage and screen actor, mainly known for classical roles at the Old Vic and for Royal Shakespeare Co.
- Jo Shapcott, poet, initially accepted before changing her mind in response to the invasion of Iraq (2003).
- Alan Sillitoe, novelist
- Robert Simpson, composer (in 1980).
- Savenaca Siwatibau, Fijian academic.
- David Storey, playwright and novelist.
- Frank Swinnerton, novelist and critic (in 1969).
- William Jenkyn Thomas (in 1935).
- Sue Townsend novelist and playwright.
- Claire Tomalin, writer (2001).
- Polly Toynbee, Guardian columnist, in 2000.
- Leslie Waddington, art gallery chairman (1999).
- Evelyn Waugh, novelist (in 1959, wanted a knighthood).
- Paul Weller, musician (in 2007).
- Garfield Weston, businessman (1998).
- Hugo Young, journalist, writer, and Chair of the Scott Trust

==== As an Officer (OBE) ====
- Donald Adamson, literary scholar and historian (in 2011).
- Peter Alliss, golfer and commentator (in 1992).
- Lindsay Anderson, theatre and film director.
- Nancy Banks-Smith, The Guardian journalist (in 1970).
- Leonard Barden, British chess champion and writer (in 1985).
- Alan Bates, former subpostmaster and campaigner. He later accepted a knighthood, in 2024.
- Stanley Baxter, actor and comedian
- Michael Bogdanov, theatre director.
- Jim Broadbent, actor (in 2002).
- Jez Butterworth, playwright, 2016.
- Peter Capaldi, actor, director and writer (possibly).
- Caryl Churchill, playwright.
- Prunella Clough, painter (in 1968), later declined CBE in 1979.
- Andrew Cruickshank, actor (in 1967).
- Roy Curthoys, journalist (in 1951); accepted appointment as CMG in 1958.
- Roald Dahl, author (in 1986, wanted a knighthood).
- Alun Herbert Davies (Alun Creunant) (in 1983).
- Edward Tegla Davies, Wesleyan Methodist minister and a Welsh language writer (in 1963).
- Eleanor Farjeon, author and poet (in 1959).
- Ifan ab Owen Edwards (in 1941). He accepted a knighthood in 1947.
- Aneez Esmail, General Practitioner and Academic in 2002.
- Cyrus J Evans (in 1920).
- Suman Fernando, psychiatrist (in 2007). "He declined the honour in protest against the UK government's 'deeply flawed' plans to extend compulsory detention powers over distressed individuals, a policy he saw as disproportionately targeting people of colour."
- John Fowles, novelist (in 1992)
- Dawn French, comedian and actress (in 2001).
- Patrick French, author, biographer, academic (in 2003). "It is ridiculous that honours given in the 21st century should have the word 'empire' in them. If I am asked to join an organisation or receive a signifier like an honour from the monarch, my instinct is to refuse. I resent being incorporated or co-opted. I distrust solidarity, and prefer things counter, original, spare, and strange."
- Mark Gatiss, actor, writer, director, producer (in 2024).
- Pam Gems, dramatist/playwright.
- Paul Ginsborg, historian
- Henry Green, novelist (in 1960).
- Hughie Green, television personality (in 1960).
- Graham Greene, author (in 1956), later also declined appointment as CBE.
- Laurence Harbottle, lawyer, services to theatre (1998).
- George Harrison, former Beatle (in 2000), reportedly he "possibly" felt he deserved a knighthood, as his fellow ex-Beatle Paul McCartney had been awarded in 1997, however, he made no official comment on the matter before he died in 2001.
- Tony Harrison, poet and playwright.
- Hamish Henderson, poet and folklorist (in 1983, in protest against the Thatcher government's nuclear policies)
- H. F. Hutchinson, art historian (in 1966).
- Saiful Islam, chemistry professor (in 2019).
- Hattie Jacques, actress/comedian (in 1974).
- Carwyn James, Rugby Union coach and commentator (in 1971).
- Idwal Jones, Welsh geographical author and Labour politician (in 1982).
- "John Jones": May be: John Gwilym Jones, Welsh writer, dramatist, novelist, short-story writer, drama director, academic and critic (in 1972).
- Jonathan Kent, theatre director (2000) (accepted a CBE in 2016)
- Philip Larkin, poet and librarian in 1968.
- Nigella Lawson, chef, gourmand, television personality/presenter; cookery writer (in 2001).
- Doris Lessing, author (in 1977; later declined appointment as DBE in 1992, because it is in the name of a non-existent Empire; accepted appointment as CH in 2000).
- Ken Loach, film director (in 1977): "I turned down the OBE because it's not a club you want to join when you look at the villains who've got it."
- L. S. Lowry, artist (declined OBE in 1955, a CBE in 1961, a knighthood in 1968 and appointment as CH, twice, in 1972 and 1976; holds the record for the most honours declined).
- Michael MacDonnell, doctor, journalist and broadcaster (in 1997).
- John McCormick, controller, BBC Scotland (1998).
- Ian McDiarmid, actor, theatre director (2000).
- Geraldine McEwan, actress in 1986 (later declined DBE in 2002).
- Paul McGuigan, filmmaker.
- Kenneth McKellar, popular Scottish tenor.
- Ivan Margary, historian (in 1960).
- Gina Martin, activist.
- Hank Marvin, guitarist (The Shadows), 2004.
- Doreen Massey, Professor of Geography.
- Alan Mattingly, Ramblers' Association (1999).
- Stanley Middleton, novelist and educationalist (in 1979).
- Ernest Milton, classical actor (in 1965).
- Rhys Hopkin Morris, appointed MBE (mil) in 1919, declined OBE (civ) in 1945, but knighted 1954.
- Craig Murray, former United Kingdom Ambassador to Uzbekistan (had previously declined appointment as LVO; later declined appointment as CVO).
- Max Newman, mathematician and wartime codebreaker (in 1946, in protest against the inadequacy of Alan Turing's OBE).
- Maggie O'Farrell, writer in 2026
- John Oliver, comic and TV host/producer (in 2019, saying: "Why on earth would I want that?").
- Hugh John Owen, (in 1942).
- Thomas Parry, Welsh writer (in 1959). He accepted a knighthood in 1978.
- Iorwerth Peate, poet and scholar (in 1963).
- Eric Porter, actor (in 1969).
- T. F. O. Rippingham, architect (in 1951).
- Michèle Roberts, author (in 2003).
- Michael Rosen, author and poet.
- Anthony Sampson, author/journalist.
- Jennifer Saunders, comedian and actress (in 2001).
- Nitin Sawhney, musician (in 2007, for ethical reasons) "I wouldn't like anything with the word 'empire' after my name." Later accepted appointment as CBE.
- Phil Scraton, professor of criminology (in 2016) "I could not receive an honour on the recommendation of those who remained unresponsive to the determined efforts of bereaved families and survivors to secure truth and justice." "I could not accept an honour tied in name to the 'British empire'".
- Jon Snow, newscaster (after having declined, investigated and presented a Channel 4 documentary, Secrets of the Honours System.)
- David Thomas, Welsh educationalist, (in 1954).
- Katherine Whitehorn, journalist, later accepted a CBE after retirement.
- Bransby Williams, actor/monologuist (in 1955).
- Grace Williams, Welsh composer (in 1967).
- Kenneth Williams, actor and comedian. "When offered something which obviously isn't worth the price... we still have the right to say 'No thanks'" (1969). He also declined several awards, e.g. Radio Personality of the Year Award 1968, 'and it gives me considerable satisfaction to turn down one of these spurious 'awards'. (Diaries 1968)
- Michael Winner, film director (in 2006; saying, "An OBE is what you get if you clean the toilets well at King's Cross station.")
- Susannah York, stage and film actress.
- Benjamin Zephaniah, poet (in 2003), stating: "I get angry when I hear the word 'empire'; it reminds me of slavery, it reminds me of thousands of years of brutality, it reminds me of how my foremothers were raped and my forefathers brutalised."

==== As a Member (MBE) ====
- John Allen, political adviser to Prime Minister Harold Wilson, declined honour in 1969.
- Derek Allhusen, Olympic equestrian gold medallist, 1969 New Year Honours (accepted appointment as CVO in 1984 as Standard Bearer of the Honourable Corps of Gentlemen at Arms).
- Marcel Aurousseau, Australian geologist, 1956 New Year Honours.
- Ruby Board, New South Wales president of the National Council of Women – "believed that her office, reflecting the work of the council, deserved higher recognition" and later accepted appointment as CMG.
- Rowena Cade, founder of the Minack Theatre, Cornwall (in 1969).
- Patrick Collins, sports journalist and author (2001).
- Joseph Corré, co-founder of Agent Provocateur (in 2007, claiming his belief that then-Prime Minister Tony Blair was "morally corrupt".)
- Huw Llywelyn Davies refused a British honour because he felt that accepting it would be "against his principles and upbringing".
- Edward Tegla Davies, Wesleyan Methodist minister and a popular Welsh language writer (in 1963).
- John Dunn, broadcaster (2000).
- Lynn Faulds Wood, TV presenter (in 2016); "I would love to have an honour if it didn't have the word 'empire' on the end of it. We don't have an empire, in my opinion."
- Howard Gayle, first black footballer to play for Liverpool FC. Declined the MBE in 2016 saying it would be "a betrayal" of Africans who suffered at the hands of the British Empire.
- Beti George (in 2020), stating "I'm also a republican and the Empire to me is a symbol of oppression, slavery and suffering. I'm in good company – the likes of Hywel Gwynfryn and the late Carwyn James and there are probably many more.".
- Hywel Gwynfryn (in the 1980s), stating "When I got the offer I had just been made a Fellow of Bangor University and was given the green robe by the Gorsedd, so I felt recognized by my country" (Wales).
- Marjorie Hebden, declined MBE for services to the Malvern Museum (1998).
- David Heckels, declined MBE (2003) for charitable services to the arts.
- Bob Holman, community activist in Easterhouse, 2012 birthday honours.
- Carwyn James, Welsh international rugby player (in 1972). He was pleased to be inducted into the Gorsedd.
- David Jones (Jonzi D), writer, choreographer and rap artist, declined MBE for services to the arts in 2012, saying subsequently: "I am diametrically opposed to the idea of empire. Man, I'm a Star Wars fan – empire is bad."
- Anish Kapoor, sculptor (1998) (accepted CBE in 2003)
- Gwendoline Laxon, declined MBE for services to charity (1997).
- Susan Loppert, art historian (2001).
- George Mpanga (aka George the Poet), poet and lyricist: "The gesture is deeply appreciated, the wording is not. It will remain unacceptable to me until Britain takes institutional measures to address the intergenerational disruption brought to millions as a result of her colonial exploits"
- Barry McGuigan, boxer (in 1986; later accepted the honour in 1994)
- Phyll Opoku-Gyimah, refused the honor in 2016 "in protest at LGBT persecution by 'colonial regimes'"
- John Pandit (aka Pandit G), musician (2002): does not believe in the honours system, says acknowledgement should be given by funding projects.
- Doris Purnell, declined MBE for services to drama (2001).
- Ethel Rudkin, Lincolnshire historian, folklorist and archaeologist, declined MBE in 1976
- John Sales, former head gardener at the National Trust (1998).
- Nikesh Shukla, author (2021): "The main reason for not accepting the MBE was because I hate how it valorises the British Empire, a brutal, bloody thing that resulted in so much death and destruction. To accept the MBE would be to co-sign it"
- Joan Smith, journalist, declined MBE as it was counter to the views she had spoken about in her career, i.e. atheism, feminism and republicanism.
- Alan Watkins, journalist, political columnist.
- Rachel Whiteread, sculptor (1997)

== Renouncing an honour ==
As no official provision exists for (unilaterally) renouncing an honour, any such act is always unofficial, and the record of the appointment in The London Gazette stands. Nevertheless, the physical insignia can be returned to the Central Chancery of the Orders of Knighthood; this is purely symbolic, as replacement insignia may be purchased for a nominal sum. Any recipient can also request that the honour not be used officially, e.g. Donald Tsang, ex-Chief Executive of Hong Kong, was knighted in 1997 but has not used the title since the handover to China.

Those who have returned insignia include:

- Yasmin Alibhai-Brown, journalist (returned MBE insignia in 2003 in her view of "a growing spirit of republicanism and partly in protest at the Labour government, particularly its conduct of the war in Iraq").
- Roy Bailey, folk singer (returned MBE insignia in August 2006 in protest at the British Government's foreign policy in Lebanon and Palestine).
- Katherine Hamnet, fashion designer, appointed CBE in 2011, tossed the insignia into a dustbin in front of cameras in 2024 because "I'm disgusted to be British for our role in genocide in Gaza".
- Alan Cumming, actor, appointed OBE in 2009, returned the insignia in 2023 because of what he had come to see as "the toxicity of empire".
- Carla Lane, television writer (appointed OBE in 1989; returned insignia in 2002 in protest at the appointment of CBE of the managing director of Huntingdon Life Sciences due to the company's reputed animal testing).
- John Lennon, musician (returned MBE insignia in 1969)
- Gareth Peirce, solicitor (gazetted CBE in 1999, but later she returned its insignia, blaming herself and apologizing to then Prime Minister Tony Blair for the misunderstanding).
- Narindar Saroop, soldier and Tory politician. Returned CBE in 2016 in disgust at the "Dishonours List" of David Cameron "showering peerages, knighthoods and other rewards on friends and party backers".
- Michael Sheen, Welsh actor (appointed OBE in the 2009 New Year Honours list for his services to drama). In 2020 Sheen returned the award after researching the relationship between Wales and the British state, saying "I'd be a hypocrite if I said the things I was going to say in the lecture about the nature of the relationship between Wales and the British state."
- Paula Vennells, the former CEO of Post Office Limited, announced in January 2024 that she would return the CBE awarded to her in the 2019 New Year Honours in light of the Post Office scandal in which many subpostmasters were wrongly accused – and some convicted – of criminal acts such as fraud and theft. In this case, the honour was officially revoked by King Charles III.
- Susan Wighton, AIDS worker (returned MBE insignia in 2006 in protest at the British Government's Middle East foreign policies).
- In June 1965, a number of holders of honours and decorations, mainly awarded for military service, returned their insignia in protest at the nomination of the four members of The Beatles for the MBE. They included Hector Dupuis, a member of the House of Commons of Canada, Paul Pearson, a former RAF squadron leader, and James Berg, all of whom returned MBEs; David Evan Rees, a former sea captain, who returned his OBE; and Richard Pape, a wartime escapee and author, who returned his Military Medal.

Knights who have "renounced" their knighthoods include:

- Maharajkumar of Vizianagram, cricketer (knighted in 1936; renounced knighthood in 1947 upon India's independence).
- Rabindranath Tagore, author and poet and Nobel Prize Winner in Literature (knighted in 1915; renounced knighthood in 1919 in protest over the Jallianwala Bagh massacre).
- C. P. Ramaswami Iyer, lawyer, parliamentarian and administrator (knighted in 1926 with the KCIE and again in 1939 with the KCSI; renounced both knighthoods in 1948 following Indian independence).
- Khwaja Nazimuddin, nobleman, administrator and politician who served as the Governor-General of Pakistan from 1948 to 1951 and as the Prime Minister of Pakistan from 1951 to 1953 (knighted in 1934 with the KCIE; renounced knighthood in 1946 due to his personal belief in independence from Britain).

== Replacement honours proposed ==
Those objecting the British Honours system have proposed alternative honours.

=== Wales ===
There have been calls to introduce a Welsh honours system such as a "Medal Cymru" which was backed by a petition but the Senedd's Assembly Commission has said that it was not an appropriate time to introduce "Medal Cymru" due to the "current economic climate" in 2009. One particular option that was considered following a public consultation, was to award one "Medal Cymru" per year from the Senedd. Tanni Grey-Thompson has said that this proposal would be a "lovely idea". In 2013, the St David Awards was launched alongside the existing British honours system, awarding Welsh people for "inspiring and exceptional work". In 2021, a petition was launched to the Senedd titled "The inauguration of an Honorary National System of Awards; The Cymru Knighthood Award", proposing a Welsh honours system. The Welsh Government said that it did not have plans to introduce a Welsh honours system to replace the British honours system.

== See also ==
- Abdication of Edward VIII
- Canadian titles debate – Ongoing debate since 1919 over whether or not Canadians can accept British honours.
  - Black v Chrétien – 2001 legal case that affirmed the power of the Canadian prime minister to block such appointments.
- List of people who have declined the Legion of Honour
