= Aled Gruffydd Jones =

British academic

Aled Jones FRHistS FRAS FLSW
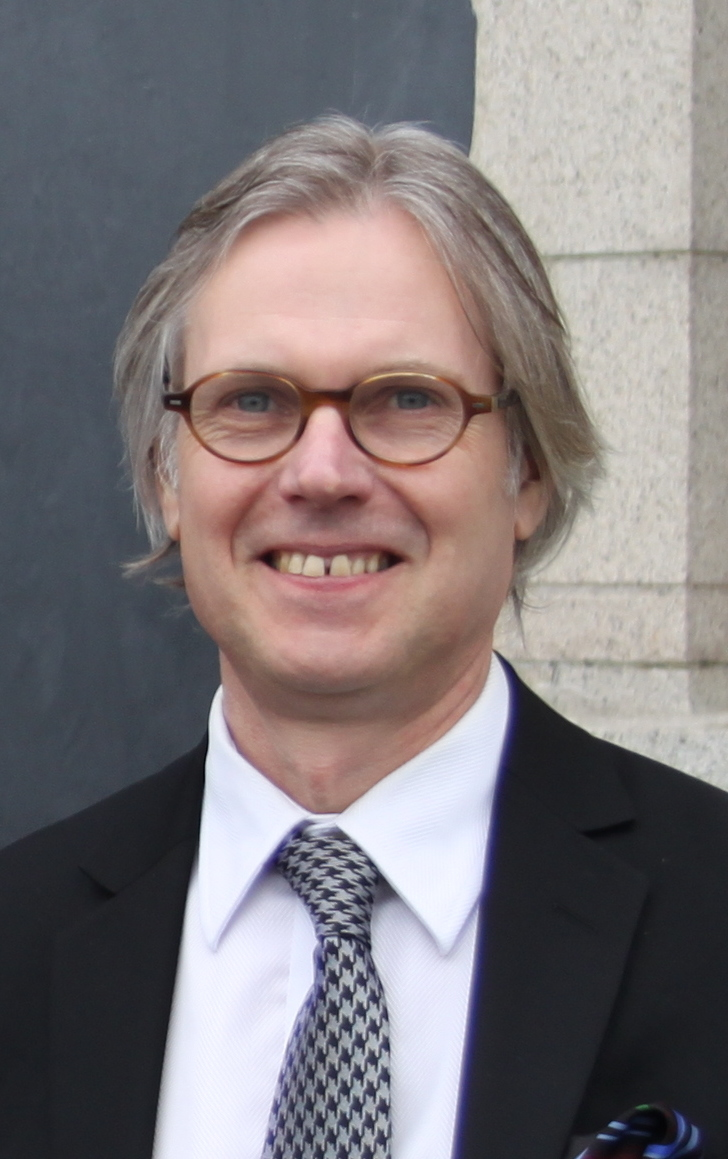
- Jones in 2014
- Born: 1955 (age 70–71)
- Education: University of Warwick (PhD)
- Spouse: Yasmin Ali

Aled Gruffydd Jones FRHistS FRAS FLSW (born 1955) is a Welsh historian and academic. He was Librarian of the National Library of Wales between 2013 and 2015.

== Biography ==
Jones was educated at Ysgol Ardudwy, Harlech, Wales, and the University of York, where he met and later married political sociologist and writer Yasmin Ali (b. 1957). He holds a doctorate from the University of Warwick (1982).

In 1979, he was appointed by Professor Sir Rees Davies to a tutorship in Modern History at Aberystwyth University and in 1994, became the first head of the newly merged Department of History and Welsh History.

In 1987, Jones was a co-founder and chair of the Welsh film and video arts collective, Creu Cof, and in 1989, was one of the organisers of the first Welsh International Film Festival at Aberystwyth (Identities / Hunaniaethau). He has contributed extensively to Welsh and English-language print journalism, TV and radio broadcasting.

He was joint editor of the Welsh social-history journal Llafur ("Labour") from 1986 to 1992; literary director (modern) of the Royal Historical Society, and editor of Transactions of the Royal Historical Society, from 2000 to 2004. In 2003 he succeeded Professor Kenneth Morgan as editor (modern) of the Welsh History Review. From 2005 to 2007, he advised the British Library on its newspaper digitization project, and has been a member of the History panel of both the Research Assessment Exercise (2008) and the Research Excellence Framework (2014). In 2009, he was appointed a trustee of the National Library of Wales and, in 2010, served as the higher-education representative on the Deputy Minister's Expert Panel on Research and Development, Welsh Assembly Government. He is a director of the Coleg Cymraeg Cenedlaethol (the National College for Welsh Medium Learning in Higher Education) (2011). He is a Fellow of the Higher Education Academy, the Royal Historical Society (FRHistS), and the Royal Asiatic Society (FRAS).

He was Sir John Williams Professor of Welsh History and Senior Pro Vice-Chancellor of Aberystwyth University until 2013. From 2013 to August 2015, he was chief executive and librarian of the National Library of Wales in Aberystwyth of which he had been vice president since May 2012.

In 2014, Jones was elected a Fellow of the Learned Society of Wales (FLSW).

== Publications ==
Jones has written on the social and cultural history of journalism and on the relationship between Wales, the British Empire and the Indian subcontinent in the nineteenth and early twentieth centuries. Publications include:

- Associate editor, Dictionary of Nineteenth Century Journalism, Academia Press/British Library, 2009
- 'Culture, "race" and the missionary public in mid-Victorian Wales', Journal of Victorian Culture, November 2005
- 'The transforming gaze: the photography of Welsh Christians in Sylhet, India, 1890-1947', Journal of the Asiatic Society of Bangladesh (Humanities), December 2004
- Entries in the Banglapedia: the National Encyclopedia of Bangladesh (2003), and the New Dictionary of National Biography (2004)
- (with William D. Jones) ‘The Welsh World and the British Empire, c. 1851–1939: an exploration’, Journal of Imperial and Commonwealth History, vol. xxxi, no. 2, May 2003, 57–81. Also available in Carl Bridge and Kent Fedorowich (eds.), The British World. Diaspora, Culture, Identity, Frank Cass, 2003, 57-81
- ‘Welsh Missionary Journalism in India, 1880-1947’ in Julie F. Codell (ed.), Imperial Co-Histories: National Identities and the British and Colonial Press, Fairleigh Dickinson University Press, Madison, 2003, 242-272
- (with William D. Jones) Welsh Reflections. Y Drych and America, 1851–2001, Gomer Press, Llandysul, 2001, (xiv, 198)
- ‘The nineteenth-century media and Welsh identity’, in Laurel Brake, Bill Bell and David Finkelstein (eds), Nineteenth-Century Media and the Construction of Identities, Palgrave, 2000, 310-325
- ‘The Welsh language and journalism’, in Geraint H. Jenkins (ed.), The Welsh Language and its Social Domains 1801–1911. A Social History of the Welsh Language, University of Wales Press, 2000, 379-404
- Powers of the Press. Newspapers, Power and the Public in Nineteenth-Century England, Scolar Press, 1996
- Press, Politics and Society. A history of journalism in Wales, University of Wales Press, 1993
- Editor (with Laurel Brake and Lionel Madden), Investigating Victorian Journalism, Macmillan, 1990, 210

Academic offices
| Preceded by Andrew M. Green | Librarian of the National Library of Wales; 2013–2015 | Succeeded by Linda Tomos |
