= Andrew Green =

Andrew Green or Andy Green may refer to:

- Andrew Green, Baron Green of Deddington (born 1941), former British diplomat and anti-immigration activist
- Andrew Green (Formula One) (born 1965), Formula One engineer
- Andrew Green (ghost hunter) (1927–2004), British ghost hunter
- Andrew Green (Jersey politician), Deputy for St Helier 3 & 4 District, Jersey
- Andrew Green (librarian), Welsh librarian
- Andrew Green (MP) for Dunwich (UK Parliament constituency)
- Andrew Haswell Green (1820–1903), American civic leader
- Andy Green (RAF officer) (born 1962), British land speed record driver
- Andy Green (baseball) (born 1977), American baseball player and manager
- Andy Green (boxer) (born 1970), English boxer
- Andy Green (darts player) (born 1946), American former darts player

== See also ==
- Andrew Greene (born 1969), Canadian Football League offensive tackle
- Andy Greene (born 1982), American ice hockey
