= R. Gwynedd Parry =

Welsh academic and barrister

Richard Gwynedd Parry FRHistS FLSW (born 28 May 1971) is a Welsh academic, barrister, and professor of law who serves as the Head of the Department of Welsh at Swansea University. He was called to the Bar of Gray's Inn in 1993, and his researches delves the intersection of law, history and language in Wales.

== Career ==
Parry has published in a vast body of scholarly publications, including monographs, articles and collections in both English and Welsh. His book, Y Gyfraith yn ein Llên (University of Wales Press, 2019), won the 2020 Hywel Dda Prize by the University of Wales's Centre for Advanced Welsh and Celtic Studies. He also wrote the biography of the Welsh jurist, David Hughes Parry in 2010.

His contribution to the debate on bilingual juries in Wales were cited by the House of Commons in 2007. He has served different offices and committees including the Welsh Language Commissioner's Advisory Panel, the Welsh Government's Welsh Language Partnership Council, and the Academic Board of Coleg Cymraeg Cenedlaethol.

== Honours ==
He is a fellow of the Royal Historical Society and the Learned Society of Wales.
