= HiPACT =

HiPACT can mean:

- HiPACT (association), an association of British universities
- HiPACT (carbon capture), a carbon capture technology
