= Helgard Krause =

German publishing executive (born 1970)

Helgard Krause FLSW

Chief Executive of the Books Council of Wales
- Incumbent
- Assumed office 2017

Head of the University of Wales Press
- In office 2010–2017

Personal details
- Born: 7 April 1970 (age 56) Pirmasens, West Germany
- Spouse: Billy Goodfellow (m. 2011)
- Education: Free University of Berlin; University of Sussex
- Occupation: Publishing executive

Helgard Krause FLSW (born 7 April 1970) is a German publishing executive based in the United Kingdom. Born in Pirmasens, she obtained her MA at the University of Sussex and worked in the British publishing industry for Routledge and The Quarto Group, before working as Head of Sales & Marketing for the Welsh Books Council (now the Books Council of Wales). She was head of the University of Wales Press from 2010 to 2017 and has been Chief Executive of the Books Council of Wales since 2017.

== Biography ==
Helgard Krause was born on 7 April 1970 in Pirmasens, the daughter of locally renowned photographers Karin and Manfred Horst Krause. During her youth, her favorite book was Ronja, the Robber's Daughter. A 1988 winner of the Scheffelpreis, she was educated at Hugo-Ball-Gymnasium and Free University of Berlin (where she obtained her Diplom-Vorprüfung in political science in 1993), before moving to the United Kingdom to attend the University of Sussex (where she obtained her MA in English Literature in 1994).

Krause's first publishing job was as a European sales representative for Routledge (1995-1998), with a one-year stint in Russia. After working at The Quarto Group as a sales and rights manager, she was promoted to Head of Sales & Rights for their imprints Rockport Publishers and RotoVision in 2000. In 2005, she left The Quarto Group for Welsh Books Council in 2005, where she was Head of Sales & Marketing until 2009.

In 2010, Krause became head of the University of Wales Press, and in 2017, she stepped down and returned to the Books Council of Wales to become their Chief Executive.

Krause was appointed Fellow of the Learned Society of Wales in 2019. In July 2020, she was elected to the Gorsedd Cymru as a Green Robe for her services to the arts.

Krause is openly gay. She married Billy Goodfellow in 2011. As of 2020, she lived in Aberaeron. In 2011, Krause described herself as a "converted Welshie".
