= Kirsti Bohata =

Welsh literary scholar

Professor Kirsti Bohata FLSW FHEA
- Education: Durham University (BA); Swansea University (PhD)
- Occupations: Professor of English Literature, Swansea University

Kirsti Bohata FLSW FHEA is a professor at Swansea University and a scholar in the field of Welsh Writing in English. She has published on postcolonial theory, queer literature, disability studies and literary geography from the nineteenth century to the present.

She was elected as a fellow of the Learned Society of Wales in 2018.

== Career ==
She graduated from Durham University with a first class BA (Hons) in English Literature; her PhD in Welsh Writing in English was awarded in 2003 by Swansea University.

Following her PhD, she worked as a publishing grants officer at the Books Council of Wales until 2007, when she joined Swansea University as an associate professor. Since 2017, she has been a Professor of English Literature at Swansea University.

She is the Director of CREW (the Centre for Research into the English Literature and English Language of Wales) at Swansea University and co-chair of the Association of Welsh Writing in English. She serves in advisory roles to the Arts Council of Wales, Literature Wales, and Arts and Humanities Research Council.

Her projects have received support and funding from the Wellcome Trust, Arts and Humanities Research Council, and the British Academy.

== Selected works ==
- Bohata, Kirsti (2004). Postcolonialism Revisited: Writing Wales in English. Cardiff: University of Wales Press. ISBN 978-0708322369.
- Bohata, Kirsti; Jones, Alexandra, eds (2019). Welsh Women's Industrial Fiction 1880–1910. Abingdon: Taylor and Francis. ISBN 978-0429330865.
- Bohata, Kirsti; Jones, Alexandra; Mantin, Mike; Thompson, Steven (2019). Disability in industrial Britain:: A cultural and literary history of impairment in the coal industry, 1880–1948. Manchester: Manchester University Press. ISBN 978-1526124326.
- Bohata, Kirsti; Gramich, Katie (2013). Rediscovering Margiad Evans: Marginality, Gender and Illness. Cardiff: University of Wales Press. ISBN 978-0708325612.
- Bohata, Kirsti (ed.) (2025). The Diary of Amy Dillwyn, 1863-1917, published by the South Wales Record Society in 2025. ISBN 978-1-7390856-1-2.
