= List of people who have declined the Legion of Honour =

The National Order of the Legion of Honour (French: Ordre national de la Légion d'honneur) is the highest and most prestigious French national order of merit, both military and civil. It was established in 1802 by Napoleon Bonaparte. The order has been retained by all subsequent French governments and regimes and is divided into five degrees of increasing distinction: Chevalier (Knight), Officier (Officer), Commandeur (Commander), Grand officier (Grand Officer) and Grand-croix (Grand Cross). Every year, an average of 2,000 French and 300 foreign nationals receive the decoration.

Reasons for refusal of the Legion of Honour include protest against the French government, modesty, or a preference to remain independent from political power.

== Honours declined ==
Year awarded	Recipient who refused		Country	Reason for refusal
Year awarded	Image	Name	Country	Reason for refusal
1864	portrait of white man in early middle age, seen in left profile; he has bushy hair and a neckbeard but no moustache.	Hector Berlioz	France	He stated that he did not care about the cross and demanded his money instead, as the state had previously promised him 3,000 francs for a requiem mass.
1945		Jean-Paul Sartre	France	In his refusal of the 1964 Nobel Prize for literature, Satre explained that he had always declined official distinctions, stating that "The writer must refuse to allow himself to be transformed into an institution even if it takes place in the most honorable forms as is the case."
1949		Georges Brassens	France	Brassens refused as he viewed it as a factor of inhibition and later wrote a satirical song about the award.
1987		Antoine Pinay	France	Pinay stated that he rendered no exceptional service.
1992		Abbé Pierre	France	Pierre refused the Grand Officer of the National Order of the Legion of Honour if the government did not create a high commission on housing for the underprivileged. He wrote in a letter addressed to Pierre Bérégovoy explaining his refusal, "Honour demands that those who suffer most should be served first. As long as this honour is ignored, how could anyone accept any distinction in our national order?" After the commission was created, he accepted the award in 2001.
1998		Bernard Clavel	France	Clavel stated that it was not a decoration for a novelist.
2003		Giovanna Melandri	Italy	In December 2020, Melandri returned her Officier award after the decoration was awarded to Egyptian president Abdel Fattah el-Sisi.
2007		Corrado Augias	Italy	In December 2020, Augias returned his Knight Grand Cross after the decoration was awarded to Egyptian president Abdel Fattah el-Sisi.
2012		Annie Thébaud-Mony	France	In a letter to Cécile Duflot explaining her refusal, Thébaud-Mony denounced the "indifference" towards occupational safety and the impunity of "industrial crimes", and called for increased government support on public health research.
2013		Jacques Tardi	France	Tardi said that he was fiercely attached to his freedom of thought and creation, and that he did not want to receive anything from a political power, stating, "We are not necessarily happy to be recognized by people we do not estimate".
2015		Thomas Piketty	France	Piketty stated that he did not think it was the government's role to decide who is honourable.
2018		Bashar al-Assad	Syria	Assad received the award in 2001, but it was not public knowledge until 2009. On 14 April 2018, France joined Britain and the United States in missile strikes against Syria after the use of chemical weapons by Assad's government against civilians, citing the Douma chemical attack. On the 16th of April, the Elysée announced that the formal revocation process had begun. On the 20th, Syria's government returned the award to France, stating that it was not an honour for Assad to wear "a decoration attributed by a slave country and follower of the United States that supports terrorists".
2025		Marjane Satrapi	Iran; France	Satrapi cited her discontent regarding France's "hypocritical" visa policies that accepted the children of Iranian oligarchs while declining applicants from young dissidents, and stated that support of women's revolution required concrete action rather than superficial gestures. She emphasised that her rejection of the decoration "is in no way an action or a thought against France. On the contrary, I deeply love this country, which is my country."

== See also ==
- List of people who have declined a British honour
- Lists of Légion d'honneur recipients
- List of foreign recipients of the Légion d'Honneur
- List of revocations of the Legion of Honour
