= Pedr ap Llwyd =

Welsh poet and librarian

Pedr ap Llwyd FLSW
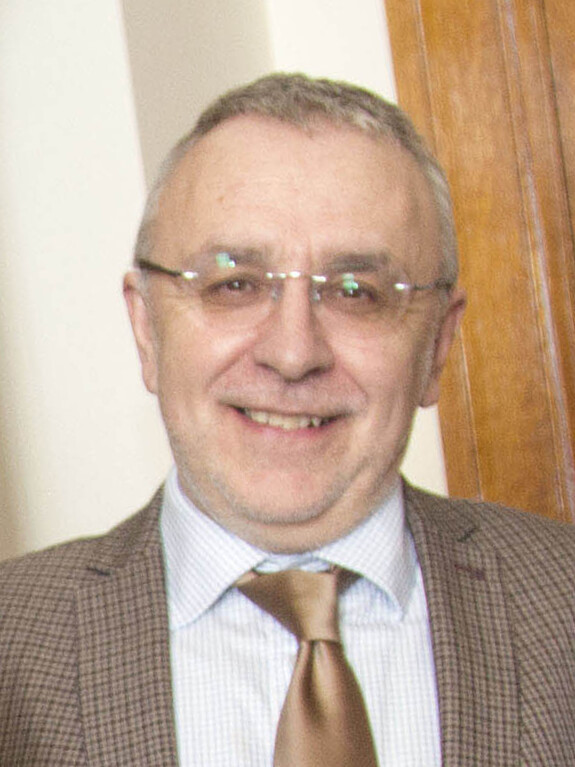
- ap Llwyd in 2020

National Librarian of Wales
- In office 1 April 2019 – 1 April 2024
- Preceded by: Linda Tomos
- Succeeded by: Rhodri Llwyd Morgan

Personal details
- Born: 20 February 1957 (age 69) Penrhyndeudraeth, Merionethshire, Wales
- Spouse: Mari
- Children: 3
- Education: Coleg Harlech; University of North Wales; University of South Wales

Pedr ap Llwyd FLSW is a Welsh a public servant, heritage practitioner, academic and archivist who served as CEO and National Librarian of Wales from 2016 to 2024. He previously served as the director of collections and public programmes at the National Library of Wales from 2015 to 2019 and secretary and director of governance from 2003 to 2015. He was the deputy director of the Books Council of Wales from 1990 to 2003.

== Early life and career ==
Pedr ap Llwyd was born on 20 February 1957 in Penrhyndeudraeth, Merionethshire. His mother, Blodwen Couture, came from Penrhyndeudraeth while his father came from London and could not speak Welsh. He grew up in Ardudwy and in an interview from 2019 said his upbringing was "difficult and poor", with his father mostly absent because of work while ap Llwyd and his mother faced mental illness.

At the age of 15, ap Llwyd bought a copy of the Dictionary of Welsh Biography at a Christmas fair organised by Plaid Cymru, which led to an interest in Welsh history. He attended Coleg Harlech before studying the Welsh language and archiving at the University of North Wales, now Bangor University. During his studies, he researched the Medieval court system and wrote poems for the local eisteddfod, for which he was chaired twice. He received BA, DET and MA degrees from the University of North Wales before studying at the University of South Wales, where he qualified in human resources.

In his early career, ap Llwyd worked at Ysgol Syr Thomas Jones in Amlwch, Anglesey as an education welfare officer. From 1980, he also served as the secretary of the evangelical church in Bangor after a religious conversion. From 1990 to 2003, ap Llwyd was the deputy director of the Books Council of Wales. In 2003, he joined the National Library of Wales as the director of governance, a role he remained in until 2015, when he became the director of collections and public governance.

== National Librarian of Wales ==
In 2018, it was announced that ap Llwyd would succeed Linda Tomos as National Librarian of Wales from April 2019. He said his priorities were to preserve and promote the National Library of Wales' Welsh identity while expanding it to new audiences who could benefit from its services. He pushed for the library to undertake its day-to-day activities in Welsh, describing it as "extremely, extremely important" for Welsh to become the natural language of the workplace, but also stressed the importance of ensuring that he would have a bilingual successor. He also focussed on the library's perceived overreliance on digitisation to the detriment of specialist expertise, pledging to recruit more specialist experts to "fill the gaps" left by digitisation.

== Awards ==
Honorary Doctorate - Bangor University for contribution to Welsh culture, language, music, and the arts.

== Personal life ==
In 1980, ap Llwyd converted to evangelical Christianity. He is married to Mari, with whom he had a son, Sion, in 1985. In 2022, he was elected as a fellow of the Learned Society of Wales.
