= Ruth King =

Ruth King may refer to:

- Ruth King (actress) (1898–1946), American film actress
- Ruth Briggs King (born 1957), American politician
- Ruth G. King (born 1933), American educational psychologist
- Ruth King (statistician), British statistician

== See also ==
- Jerry Ruth, known as "The King", American drag racer
