= Leighton Evans =

British philosopher

- Born: 1979 (age 46–47); Neath, Wales
- Awards: Dillwyn Medal

Education
- Education: Swansea University (PhD, BSc), University of Wales Trinity Saint David (MA)

Philosophical work
- Era: 21st-century philosophy
- Region: Western philosophy
- Institutions: Swansea University, University of Brighton
- Main interests: philosophy of technology, media studies

Leighton Evans is a British philosopher and professor of media theory at Swansea University. He is known for his works on philosophy of technology and media studies. Evans is a recipient of Dillwyn Medal in Social Sciences, Business and Education from the Learned Society of Wales.

In 2026, Evans was elected a Fellow of the Learned Society of Wales

== Books ==
- Evans, L. (2025). Media Studies: Industries, Texts and Audiences. Sage.
- Evans, L. (Ed.). (2025). Virtual Reality Gaming: Perspectives on Immersion, Embodiment and Presence. Emerald.
- Evans, L., Frith, J., & Saker, M. (2022). From Microverse to Metaverse: Modelling the Future through Today’s Virtual Worlds. Emerald Publishing Limited.
- Saker, M. & Evans, L. (2021). Intergenerational Locative Play: Augmenting Family. Emerald.
- Evans, L. (2018). The Re-emergence of Virtual Reality. Routledge.
- Coletta, C., Evans, L., Heaphy, L. and Kitchin, R. (eds.) (2018), Creating Smart Cities. Routledge.
- Evans, L. & Saker, M. (2017). Location-Based Social Media. Palgrave Macmillan.
- Evans, L. (2015). Locative Social Media: Place in the Digital Age. Palgrave Macmillan.
