= Hywel R. Thomas =

Welsh academic

Hywel Rhys Thomas is a British scientist researching in the area of civil engineering, who is known for his work on the behaviour of unsaturated soils. He is Professor of Civil Engineering and founder director of the Geoenvironmental Research Centre at Cardiff University, and served as a pro-vice chancellor of that university (2010–18). He was elected a Fellow of the Royal Society in 2012 and has been president of the Learned Society of Wales since 2020.

== Career ==
Thomas was a senior research assistant at University College, Swansea in 1978. In 1980, he joined Cardiff University as successively lecturer, senior lecturer and reader; he was appointed Professor of Civil Engineering in 1995. He has also held the posts of Senior Deputy Head (1999–2002) and then director of the Cardiff School of Engineering (2002–2010). He was also a pro-vice chancellor of Cardiff University (2010–2018), and since 1996 he has been the founder director of the university's Geoenvironmental Research Centre. As of 2023, he is also a distinguished research professor at Swansea University.

He has also worked with the United Nations Industrial Development Organisation (UNIDO), the International Atomic Energy Agency (IAEA) and UNESCO.

== Research ==
Thomas is known for his research into the behaviour of unsaturated soils. He researches high-speed aerodynamics, data analysis, geoenvironmental and geotechnical engineering; his main research interests are "Coupled Processes in the Ground" and other geoenvironmental issues, such as flow problems in soils in rocks, nuclear waste, land regeneration and sustainability. He develops computer models to understand the movement of chemicals and gases at different temperatures and water pressures, and with different applied mechanical forces.

== Honours and awards ==
He is an elected fellow of Royal Academy of Engineering (2003), the Transport Research Foundation (2005), the Learned Society of Wales (2011) and the Royal Society of London (2012), a member of the Academia Europaea (2012) and an elected foreign member of the Chinese Academy of Sciences (2021). His awards include the Dufton Silver Medal of the Chartered Institution of Building Services Engineers (1999). In 2017, he was appointed CBE for services to academic research and higher education. He has served as president of the Learned Society of Wales since 2020.

== Selected publications ==
Thomas' highest-cited research articles are:

- H. R. Thomas, P. Cleall, Y.-C. Li, C. Harris, M. Kern-Luetschg (2009). Modelling of cryogenic processes in permafrost and seasonally frozen soils. Géotechnique 59 (3): 173–84 doi:10.1680/geot.2009.59.3.173
- H. R. Thomas, Y. He (1995). Analysis of coupled heat, moisture and air transfer in a deformable unsaturated soil. Géotechnique 45 (4): 677–89 doi:10.1680/geot.1995.45.4.677
