= Marcel Aurousseau =

Australian geographer

Marcel Aurousseau MC C. de G. (19 April 1891 in Woollahra, Sydney – 22 August 1983 in Sydney) was an Australian geographer, geologist, war hero, historian and translator.

Aurousseau, who was of French and Irish descent, attended Sydney Boys High School alongside three students who were also later prominent in various fields: Arthur Wheen (an historian and translator), Raymond Kershaw (an economist), and Arthur McLaughlin (a medical practitioner).

He began his scientific career as an "office boy" at the Australian Museum in Sydney. While completing the Bachelor of Science course at the University of Sydney, Aurousseau won the University Medal in Geology.

In 1913, he was appointed to the position of assistant lecturer at the newly formed geology department of the University of Western Australia (UWA), in Perth.

== Army service ==
Lt. Marcel Aurousseau, Inf. For conspicuous gallantry in action. He took command when his company commander was killed, and inspired all ranks by his fine example. During a night attack, he led his company forward with great dash till he was severely wounded.

— London Gazette, 14 November 1916.

Following the outbreak of World War I, Aurousseau obtained leave from UWA, to join the Australian Imperial Force. He was assigned initially to the 28th Battalion (1915), before joining the 51st Battalion on the Western Front.

Aurousseau first saw action in France at the battles of Fleurbaix (Fromelles), the Pozières and the Mouquet Farm (14–15 August 1916), which resulted in his being wounded severely. He was subsequently awarded the Military Cross.

Promoted to captain, Aurousseau also served at the Battle of Messines, the Third Battle of Ypres (Polygon Wood), the First Battle of Dernancourt (part of the Battle of Villers-Bretonneux), and was wounded again at Hourges, during the Battle of Amiens, in August 1918.

For his war service, Aurousseau was also awarded the French Croix de Guerre (1919).

== Scientific and literary career ==
Returning to Perth after the war, Aurousseau again taught geology at UWA.

He subsequently moved to the United States, to work at the Geophysical Laboratory of the Carnegie Institution, in Washington DC. During 1923–24, Aurousseau worked for the American Geographical Society in New York.

After returning briefly to Australia, Aurousseau moved to London to pursue a literary career.

Between 1936 and 1955 he worked as executive secretary of the British Government Permanent Committee on Geographical Names. During World War II, Aurousseau contributed to military geographical dictionaries used by Allied forces. In 1956 he declined the award of an MBE.

In his most influential work, The Rendering of Geographical Names (1957), Aurousseau coined the term exonym: a place name that is the common name only in countries or regions outside the place in question, usually for historical reasons. Usage of "exonym" has grown to include non-geographical proper names for things such as languages, cultures or populations. Some significant examples of exonyms therefore include: the English language "China" for Zhōngguó; the Spanish word estadounidenses (lit. "unitedstatesians") for "Americans", and; the English "German" for Deutsch.

In 1969, the Royal Geographical Society presented Aurousseau with the Victoria Medal, an annual award "for conspicuous merit in research in geography". He was elected an Honorary Fellow of the Australian Academy of the Humanities in 1972.

== Authored works ==
Aurousseau's published works include:

Travel books

- Highway Into Spain, London, Peter Davies (1930), 1st ed., 686 pages.
- Highway Into Spain, London, Peter Davies (1931), 2nd ed., 294 pages.
- Beyond the Pyrenees, London, Peter Davies (1931), orig. publ. 1930 as part of Highway Into Spain.

Geography/history

- The Rendering of Geographical Names, London, Hutchinson (1957).
- The Letters of F. W. Ludwig Leichhardt (transl. & ed.), London, Hakluyt Society/Cambridge University Press (1968).

Sound recording

- Marcel Aurousseau interviewed by Hazel de Berg for the Hazel de Berg collection (1977), c. 36 minutes; held by the National Library of Australia.
