= Meena Upadhyaya =

Indian-born Welsh medical geneticist

Professor Dame Meena Upadhyaya DBE FRCPath FLSW
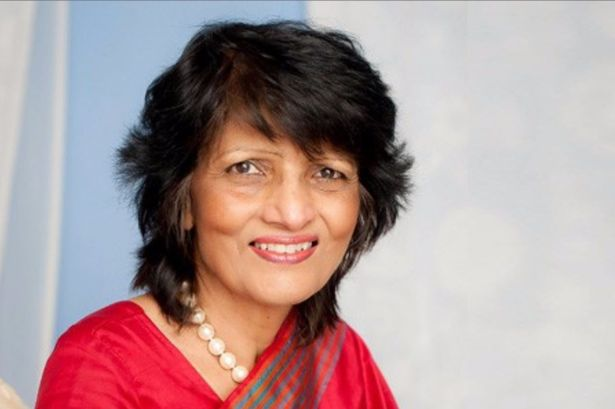
- Born: India
- Occupation: Medical geneticist

Dame Meena Upadhyaya is an Indian-born Welsh medical geneticist and a professor emerita at Cardiff University. Her research has focused on the genes that cause various genetic disorders, in particular neurofibromatosis type I and facioscapulohumeral muscular dystrophy.

== Biography ==
Upadhyaya was born in India. She entered an arranged marriage and joined her husband in the United Kingdom when she was 19. Having studied an honours bachelor's degree in biology at the University of Delhi, she completed a Master of Science at the University of Edinburgh followed by a doctorate at Cardiff University.

Upadhyaya completed a fellowship with the Royal College of Pathologists in 2000, becoming one of the first people to do so in the field of medical genetics. Her research career focused on genetic disorders, especially neurofibromatosis type I and facioscapulohumeral muscular dystrophy. She was involved in identifying the genetic mutations responsible for these two diseases and evaluating whether certain mutation was associated with specific clinical features. She developed molecular tests to aid in the diagnosis of more than 20 genetic diseases including neurofibromatosis type 1. She has also researched the reasons that in some people with neurofibromatosis type I, the benign tumours can become malignant. Using high-throughput techniques, she was able to identify molecular targets which would be important for the treatment of the patients. Over her career, she authored more than 200 scientific articles, wrote 24 book chapters and edited four textbooks and received awards from the Muscular Dystrophy Association (2009), the Inspire Wales Awards (2010), the Theodor Schwann award from the European Neurofibromatosis Group (2013), and the recognition award from Welsh Assembly (2011). She was a professor in Cardiff University's Institute of Cancer Genetics and directed the All Wales Medical Genetics Service Research and Development Laboratory until her retirement in 2014, thereafter serving as an honorary distinguished professor at Cardiff until 2023. In 2016, for her "services to medical genetics and the Welsh Asian Community", she was awarded an OBE. She received the St David Award in 2017, under the Innovation, Science and Technology category, for her outstanding contribution to medical genetics. Additionally, she was presented with the Welsh Muslim Council award in 2019 for her contributions to academia, and the Legacy Maker Community Achievement Award (2019) from Race Council Cymru. In 2017, Upadhyaya became the first female British-Indian professor to receive Honorary Fellowship at University of Wales Trinity Saint David. She was later appointed as an Honorary Professor in Practice in 2021. She is listed as one of the 100 Wales's brilliant women by Wales Online. She also made to the list of 100 Welsh Women, created by Women's Equality Network, to mark the centenary of the Representation of the People Act 1918. She was awarded the prestigious fellowship of Learned Society of Wales in 2018. She has been an International Advisor for the Organisation of the Rare Diseases, India (2016) and also sits on the advisory board of Genome India international forum, Philadelphia, USA and on the Medical Advisory Board as well as a trustee of Nerve Tumours, UK. Upadhyaya is a co-director of the project titled "70 Years of Struggle and Achievement: Life Stories of Ethnic Minority Women in Wales 2019" which is funded by the Heritage Lottery Fund. She co-edited a book on this project, which was published by Parthians in 2021. Upadhyaya collaborated with the Welsh Government to organise the inaugural Festival of Communities in Cardiff in 2023.

She organised the First International Conference on RASopathies and Neurofibromatoses in Asia: Identification and Advances of New Therapeutics in Kochi, Kerala, India in 2017.

She was elected to be a Council Member of the regional RCPath in 2014 and the Learning Society of Wales in 2020. Upadhyaya also served as a mentor on Dame Rosemary Butler's Women in Public Life Scheme (2014–2015). She is a trustee for Race Equality First, Race Council Cymru, the European NF Association and sits on the Advisory Committee of Cardiff University's BME+ Staff Network, NWAMI, Purple Plaques, Monumental Welsh Women and Equity in STEM. Upadhyaya was appointed as a Non-Executive Director (NED) on the Welsh Government Civil Service Board (2020–2024). She was appointed as an Honorary Professor of Amrita School of Medical Sciences, Kochi, Kerala, India (2020), Visiting professor at the Institute of Medical Genetics and Genomics at Sir Gangaram Medical Hospital, Delhi in 2023 and an Honorary Executive Director of Chhaya Public School, India in 2020.

Upadhyaya is also an advocate for women of ethnic minorities; she is the founder and Chair of Welsh Asian Women Achievement Awards, now Ethnic Minority Welsh Women Achievement Association (EMWWAA) and the organisation Ethnic Minority Women in Welsh Healthcare (EMWWH). She sits on many committees focusing on equality, diversity and academia.

She has one daughter, Dr Rachna Upadhya MBBCh.MRCGP. MBA who has had a senior career in Medicine and Investment Banking. Rachna also continues to work in finance in combination with several international Board roles.
