= Bob Holman (academic) =

Bob Holman (November 8, 1936 – June 15, 2016) was an English Christian socialist academic, author, and community campaigner in Scotland.

Born as Robert Bones in Ilford, he was educated at University College London and the London School of Economics. Holman was professor of social administration at the University of Bath. He left the university and moved with his family to the Southdown council estate in Bath in 1976.

Holman was a co-founder of Family Action in Rogerfield and Easterhouse Project in Glasgow in 1989, and a member of Easterhouse Baptist Church. He moved to the estate in 1987.

Holman was a member of the Labour Party since 1961, and a supporter of Labour leader Jeremy Corbyn. He advocated a 'yes' vote in the 2014 Scottish independence referendum.

Holman was married to Annette who was a medical social worker from Glasgow. They have a daughter, Ruth, who is a gynaecologist and a son David who is a lecturer in occupational psychology. He declined the award of an MBE in 2012 as an opponent of the monarchy, arguing the honours system was designed to promote differences of status to which he was opposed. Holman and his wife were awarded the title of Outstanding Contribution to Social Work by Community Care in November 2015.

Having recovered from Hodgkin lymphoma in 2010, Holman was diagnosed with motor neurone disease in summer 2015. He died in June 2016, aged 79.

== Publications ==
- Crime and the Responsible Community (The 1979 London Lectures in Contemporary Christianity), with Charles Colson; Norman Anderson; David McNee; and Michael Jenkins Wm.B. Eerdmans Pub. Co. ISBN 9780802818317
- Kids at the Door: A Preventative Project on a Council Estate, with Wiles, Dave, and Lewis, Sandie, Blackwell Publishers, 1981, ISBN 9780631125860
- Putting Families First: Prevention and Child Care, Palgrave Macmillan 1988 ISBN 9780333437940
- Good Old George: The Life of George Lansbury, Lion Books 1990, ISBN 9780745915746
- A New Deal for Social Welfare: A Powerful Analysis of the Contract Culture and Practical Proposals for a Way Forward, Lion Books, 1993 ISBN 9780745928487
- Not Like Any Other Home'; Herbert White and the Children's Home and Mission, Campaign Literature, Saltcoats 1994
- The Evacuation: A Very British Revolution, Lion Books, 1995
- The Corporate Parent: Manchester Children's Department, 1948-71, National Institute For Social Work, 1996 ISBN 9781899942091
- Towards Equality: A Christian Manifesto (Gospel and Cultures)SPCK Publishing, 1997 ISBN 9780281050468
- Children and Crime, Lion Books, 1997
- Fare Dealing: Neighbourhood Involvement in a Housing Scheme, Community Development Foundation, ISBN 9780902406766
- Faith in the Poor, Lion Books, 1998 ISBN 9780745939919
- Reshaping Child Care Practice, National Institute For Social Work, 1999 ISBN 9781899942329
- Kids at the Door Revisited, Russell House Publishing Ltd., 2000
- Champions for Children: The Lives of Modern Child Care Pioneers, Policy Press 2001, ISBN 9781861343420
- The Unknown Fostering, Russell House Publishing Ltd 2002, ISBN 9781903855034
- Ordinary Christians, Good News Fellowship, 2005 ISBN 9780952039440
- F.B. Meyer: If I had a Hundred Lives, Christian Focus 2007
- Keir Hardie Labour's Greatest Hero, Oxford, Lion Books, 2010. ISBN 9780745953540
- Woodbine Willie: An Unsung Hero of World War One, Lion Books 2013 ISBN 9780745955612
