= Angela Mihai =

British applied mathematician

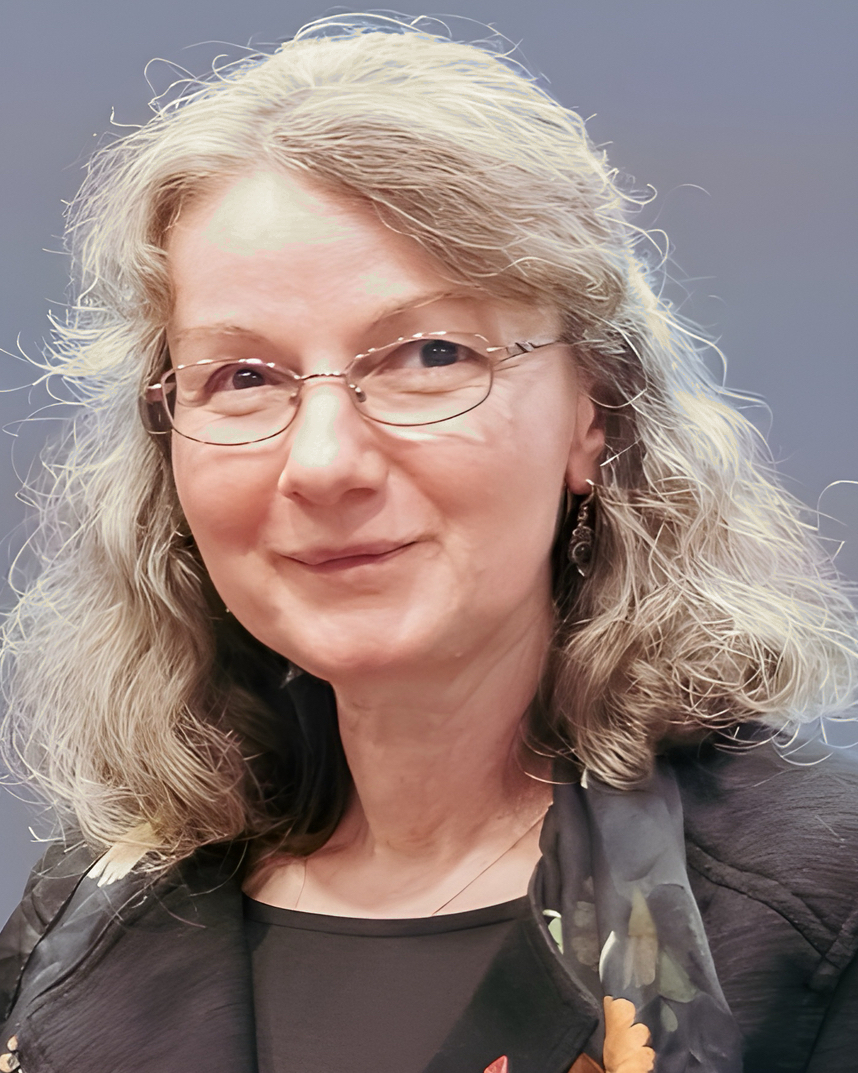
L. Angela Mihai FIMA FLSW

Loredana Angela Mihai FIMA FLSW is a British applied mathematician and numerical analyst. Originally from Romania, she is Professor of Applied Mathematics at Cardiff University where her interdisciplinary work bridges mathematics with materials science and biomechanics.

She contributed research on soft, smart, and biological materials through pioneering approaches like stochastic modelling of elasticity that bring mathematical rigour to real-world materials with complex behaviours.

== Education and career ==
Mihai earned her PhD in numerical analysis at Durham University in 2005. After postdoctoral research at the University of Strathclyde, University of Cambridge, and University of Oxford, she joined the Cardiff University academic staff as a lecturer in 2011.

== Leadership and service ==
From 2023 to 2025, she served as Vice President of the United Kingdom and Republic of Ireland Section of the Society for Industrial and Applied Mathematics.

== Recognition ==
Mihai is a Fellow of the Institute of Mathematics and its Applications and a Fellow of the Learned Society of Wales.
