= Huw Llywelyn Davies =

Welsh broadcaster & rugby union commentator (born 1945)

- Born: 19 February 1945 (age 81); Merthyr Tydfil, Wales
- Education: Cardiff University
- Occupations: Sports commentator, television presenter, radio broadcaster
- Employer: BBC Wales
- Spouse: Carol Davies
- Children: Rhodri Llywelyn

Huw Llywelyn Davies (born 19 February 1945) is a Welsh broadcaster and rugby union commentator.

Davies started working in television in 1974 when he joined HTV to present the Welsh-language news programme Y Dydd. Five years later, he moved to the BBC where he initially worked on sports programming for their Radio Cymru service. In 1983, Davies commentated on the first live television coverage of a rugby union match in the Welsh language on the newly established S4C channel.

Davies covered five Lions tours and five Rugby World Cup tournaments for S4C, in addition to other international and domestic rugby matches before retiring in 2014. He also presented BBC Wales and later S4C's coverage of the National Eisteddfod for 33 years, as well as numerous other programmes including light entertainment and religious programming.

== Early life ==
Huw Llywelyn Davies was born in Merthyr Tydfil in 1945, to father Eic Davies, a teacher and radio broadcaster and mother Beti. He moved to Gwaun-cae-Gurwen at an early age. Davies was educated at Pontardawe Grammar School. He graduated from University of Wales, Cardiff with a degree in Welsh.

After graduating, Davies trained to be a teacher, and he worked at Llandovery College from 1969 to 1974 reaching the position of the Head of Welsh Department.

== Broadcasting career ==
In 1974, Davies left his teaching position to join broadcaster HTV as a presenter on the Welsh-language news programme Y Dydd.

At the end of 1978, Davies was approached at an event by Gareth Price, then head of BBC Wales. Price advised him that having had built up enough experience, it was time to move from HTV to the BBC. Price warned that there was no future for sports coverage at HTV, only at the BBC. Davies moved to the BBC the following year, working initially on BBC Radio Cymru programming, including talk shows, programs for Welsh learners, panel shows, and rugby commentary. His father, Eic Davies, had been part of a group that conceived words in the Welsh-language for much of the terminology used in rugby, and through his broadcast work, Huw Llywelyn Davies is credited with legitimising the terms into everyday language.

A dedicated Welsh language television channel, S4C, launched in 1982 with the BBC's Welsh-language television programmes moving to this service. In addition, the new channel allowed events shown only in English to also be covered in Welsh. Davies commentated on the first live television coverage of a rugby match in the Welsh language, the 1983 match between Wales and England. He was paired with Ray Gravell, the former Welsh centre, and the two formed a commentary partnership that was attributed as being "instrumental in establishing the channel as a serious rugby broadcaster".

Davies travelled to New Zealand in 1983 to commentate on the Lions tour, the first of five Lions tours he covered for S4C. He also covered five Rugby World Cup tournaments, including the inaugural event held in New Zealand and Australia in 1987.

During the late 1990s and early 2000s Davies was moved to commentate on games for BBC Wales in the English language. He then was given a choice to remain or return to Welsh language coverage on S4C. He chose the latter, believing that he had more of a contribution to give.

Davies made one last appearance as an English language commentator when he took over commentary of the 2013 Wales vs. Italy international match. Having covered the first half in the Welsh language on S4C, he stepped in to cover the second half for BBC Television when the scheduled match commentator, Andrew Cotter, took ill.

After covering over 300 international matches, Davies covered his final international in 2014, Wales vs. Scotland. Prior to the game, he was presented with a framed shirt to mark the occasion by Roger Lewis, the chief executive of the Welsh Rugby Union. His final commentary was the 2014 Pro 12 semi-final match held a few months later between Leinster and Ulster.

== Other coverage ==
In addition to his sports coverage, Davies also presented Dechrau Canu, Dechrau Canmol. He was also a presenter on BBC Wales's coverage of the annual National Eisteddfod for 33 years, making his debut at the 1980 event held in the Lliw Valley and covering his last in 2012 at the Vale of Glamorgan.

== Honours and recognition ==
In recognition of the contributions made in the Welsh-language, he was honoured as a member of the Gorsedd of the Bards at the National Eisteddfod in 1987 when he was appointed as an Ovate (green robes). Davies adopted Huw Llywelyn as his bardic name. He originally planned to take the name Huw Eic, as a nod to the patronymic naming system that had historically been commonplace in Wales, however his father objected. In 1994, he was promoted to a Druid (white robes). Davies was Chairman of the Working Committee responsible for organising the 2008 National Eisteddfod in Cardiff, which he took on in addition to his presenting duties for S4C.

In 2007, Davies was awarded an Honorary Fellowship at Cardiff University, the university where he had graduated from. He is the President of Pentyrch RFC, a rugby club located in the village of Pentyrch where he now lives. Davies was offered to be appointed to the Order of the British Empire (MBE) but declined because he felt that accepting it would be "against his principles and upbringing".

== Personal life ==
Davies is married to Carol with whom he has a son, Rhodri, who has followed his father into broadcasting, presenting news programming on S4C.
