= Jing (Maggie) Chen =

Chinese financial mathematician

Jing (Maggie) Chen is a Chinese mathematician specialising in financial mathematics, including the mathematical modelling of liquidity and its relation to financial policy, Hawkes processes, and the applications of artificial intelligence to financial technology. She is responsible for bringing the financial applications of Hawkes processes to the attention of Alan Hawkes, and together they published foundational work on the subject. She works in the United Kingdom, where she holds a personal chair as a professor of mathematics at Cardiff University.

== Education and career ==
Chen studied computer science at Lanzhou Jiaotong University in China, and began working in the computer software industry. She continued her studies in the UK at the University of Aberdeen, receiving a master's degree in finance and investment management and then a doctorate in finance in 2011.

She became a lecturer in the Swansea University School of Management, and was promoted to senior lecturer there before moving to Cardiff University in 2015 as a senior lecturer.

== Recognition ==
Chen was elected as a Fellow of the Learned Society of Wales in 2025.
