= Chris Williams (historian) =

Welsh historian (1963–2024)

Chris Williams FLSW FRHS
- Born: 9 March 1963; Griffithstown, Monmouthshire, Wales
- Died: 4 April 2024 (aged 61)

Academic background
- Education: Balliol College, Oxford; Cardiff University (PhD)

Academic work
- Institutions: Cardiff University; University of Glamorgan; Swansea University; University College Cork

Christopher Mark Williams FLSW FRHS (9 March 1963 – 4 April 2024) was a Welsh academic, best known for his work on editing the diaries of Richard Burton. Williams was Head of the College of Arts, Celtic Studies and Social Sciences, and Professor of History at University College Cork, Ireland, from 2017 to 2024.

== Career ==
Williams was a graduate of Balliol College, Oxford, and obtained his doctorate from Cardiff University before becoming a lecturer there. He subsequently worked at the University of Glamorgan and in 2005 became Professor of Welsh History and Director of the Research Institute for Arts and Humanities at Swansea University. He was a Royal Commissioner with the Royal Commission on the Ancient and Historical Monuments of Wales and was Chairman of the Welsh Heritage Schools Initiative. In 2013 he took up his appointment at Cardiff University. Williams was appointed Head of the College of Arts, Celtic Studies and Social Sciences in 2017 at UCC.

In 2016, Williams was elected a Fellow of the Learned Society of Wales.

== Research ==
Williams' edition of the Burton diaries was published by Yale University Press. The diaries were donated to Swansea University by Burton's widow, Sally Burton, in 2006. He wrote extensively on the history of the South Wales Coalfield and on modern Welsh history and most recently on the history of political cartoons and caricature in Britain from the 18th century to the Second World War.

== Personal life ==
Williams was born in Griffithstown, Monmouthshire, Wales on 9 March 1963, to Peter and Josephine Williams. He spent the first three years of his life in Newport, but his family later moved to Swindon, where he did his O-Levels and A-Levels, spending a year in the army before going to the University of Oxford.

Williams' eldest son, from his first marriage to Siobhan McClelland is The Revd Dr Harri Williams, Principal of St Stephen's House, Oxford.

He lectured on mountaineering around the world and in Wales. A keen walker, he climbed La Breche De Rolland in the French Pyrenees, Ben Nevis, Snowdon and Pen-y-Fan.

Williams died from a heart attack on 4 April 2024, at the age of 61.

== Works ==
- B. L. Coombes (Writers of Wales series) (with William D. Jones; 1999)
- With Dust Still in His Throat: A B.L.Coombes Anthology (with Bill Jones; 1999)
- Postcolonial Wales (ed, with Jane Aaron; 2005)
- Robert Owen and his Legacy (ed., with Noel Thompson; 2011)
- The Richard Burton Diaries (ed; 2012)
- The Gwent County History, vol. 4 (ed, with Sian Rhiannon Williams; 2011)
- The Gwent County History, vol. 5 (ed, with Andy Croll; 2013)
