= Linda Tomos =

Welsh librarian (born 1952)

Linda Tomos CBE (née Williams; born 1 April 1952), is a Welsh librarian. She was the first woman to be appointed Librarian and Chief Executive of the National Library of Wales, a post she held until 2019. She worked for more than forty years in the field of librarianship and information science.

Tomos was born in Llanelli; her parents were Arthur Horatio Williams and Mary Eileen Williams. She was brought up in the Oxford area, and attended Didcot Girls' Grammar School. She graduated from Aberystwyth University with a degree in History and Librarianship. In 1974 she married Merfyn Wyn Tomos.

Prior to her appointment at the NLW, Tomos worked for the Welsh Government, where she was responsible for library, archive and museum policy and was involved in the implementation of the UK People's Network and the first Library Strategy for Wales in 2005. She has been Chair of the Library and Information Services Council for Wales (LISC Wales) which advised Ministers prior to 2004, Chair of the BBC Educational Broadcasting Council Wales, and Chair of the National Trust Advisory Council for Wales.

In 2019 Tomos was nominated by the Women's Equality Network as one of the year's "100 Welsh Women". Shortly afterwards, she was made an Honorary Fellow of the University of Wales Trinity Saint David. In 2020 she was awarded the CBE in the Queen's Birthday Honours.

Academic offices
Preceded by Aled Gruffydd Jones	Librarian of the National Library of Wales; 2013–15	Succeeded by Pedr ap Llwyd
