= Deirdre Beddoe =

Welsh historian

Deirdre Beddoe, FLSW (born 1942) is a historian of women in modern Britain, with particular focus on Wales. She is Emeritus Professor of Women's History at the University of Glamorgan, Pontypridd.

== Life ==
She was involved in the Women's Liberation Movement as a member of Cardiff Women's Action Group in the 1970s.

== Career ==
Beddoe has written about the history of women in modern Britain and Wales. She has researched women's lives during the First and Second World Wars, women's suffrage, and women's writing in twentieth-century Britain. She was a founder member of Women's Archive of Wales, established in 1997 to raise the profile of women in the history of Wales. She organised the first conference on women's history in Wales in 1983. In 2008 she was awarded the Western Mail Val Feld Award for her outstanding contribution to the promotion of the role of women in Welsh life. She was elected Fellow of the Learned Society of Wales in 2012.

== Media ==
Beddoe was director, along with Sheila Owen-Jones, of I'll Be Here For All Time, a 1985 film tracing the tradition of Welsh women's protest and demonstrating that a knowledge of women's history is essential. In 2016 she created a BBC programme on Welsh Women of World War One. She has also been historical advisor for five films.
