= Books Council of Wales =

Literature organisation in Wales

- Cyngor Llyfrau Cymru
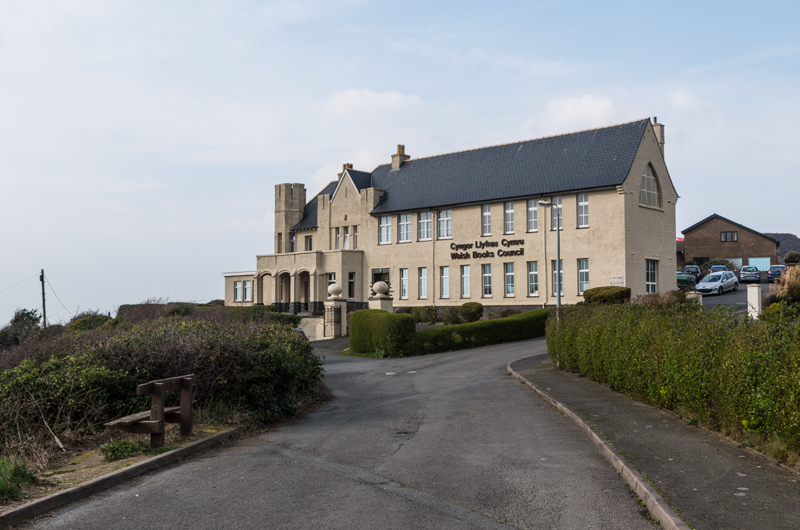
- Books Council headquarters in Aberystwyth
- Abbreviation: BCW
- Predecessor: Union of Welsh Books Societies
- Formation: 1961
- Type: Charitable Incorporated Organisation
- Purpose: Literature advocacy and publishing industry support
- Headquarters: Castell Brychan, Aberystwyth, Wales
- Region served: Wales
- Services: Publishing grants, editorial services, distribution, reading promotion
- Fields: Publishing, literature, literacy promotion
- Official language: Welsh and English
- Chief Executive: Helgard Krause
- Main organ: Board of Trustees
- Staff: 40 permanent staff (2024)
- Website: llyfrau.cymru
- Formerly called: Welsh Books Council

The Books Council of Wales (Welsh: Cyngor Llyfrau Cymru; previously known as the Welsh Books Council) is a national charity and literature advocacy organisation in Wales. Established in 1961, it supports the publishing industry in Wales and is partly funded by the Welsh Government. The Council's aims are to promote the interests of Welsh language books and English language books of interest to Wales, to promote the publishing industry, and to assist and support authors by offering a number of services and distributing grants.

== History ==
The Books Council of Wales came into existence in late 1961, taking the place of the Union of Welsh Books Societies. The organisation has deep roots in the voluntary sector, with local authorities providing significant financial support alongside central government funding in its early years.

The UK Government earmarked £1,000 in 1956 which assisted with the publishing of new works in Welsh, a sum which rose slowly over the following few years. The impetus at that time was very much from the voluntary sector, with local authorities providing more financial support than central government.

The organisation grew significantly under the directorship of Alun Creunant Davies, who became Director in 1965 and retired in 1987. During his tenure, the Council expanded from an organisation with approximately one member of staff to one with 26 staff and a turnover of about £500,000 per year by 1987.

=== Expansion of Role ===
In 1979, the Welsh Office provided the Books Council with an additional £55,000 per annum to administer and fund general books for children and periodicals for children and adults. In 1981-82, the Welsh Office provided all of its support for books in Welsh for adults to the WBC to administer, amounting to £285,000.

A significant milestone came in 2001-02 with the establishment of a Task and Finish Group on Publishing, which made 13 recommendations that were all accepted by the Welsh Government. The first recommendation was that the Welsh Government should give attention to the publishing industry as a whole – in the English and Welsh languages; and the second that the Welsh Government should pay the publishing grant directly to the WBC.

In 2004, following recommendations from the Welsh Assembly's Culture, Welsh Language and Sport Committee, a sum of £250,000 was provided to WBC to support English writing in Wales, in particular a new series of books under the title "Library of Wales".

=== Governance Changes ===
On 1 April 2021, the Books Council transferred from being an unregistered charity to a Charitable Incorporated Organisation (CIO) with a new Board of Trustees. This change modernised the organisation's governance structure while maintaining its charitable status and mission.

== Organisation and Structure ==
The Council operates from two main locations in Aberystwyth. The council's headquarters are in the former St Mary's College building in Castell Brychan, Aberystwyth; and it also has a distribution centre on the outskirts of the town at Glanyrafon Enterprise Park. It employs 40 permanent staff between both locations.

=== Governance ===
There are 11 members on the Board of Trustees, including the four Chief Officers who transferred from the Council's former Executive Committee and seven new appointments which were announced on 1 April 2021 following an open recruitment process. The Board of Trustees is responsible for the governance of the Books Council and oversees the strategic direction of the charity.

The current Chief Executive is Helgard Krause, who has led the organisation through recent strategic developments and funding expansions.

== Activities and Services ==
The Books Council provides a comprehensive range of services to support the Welsh publishing industry:

=== Publishing Support ===
The Council offers design and editorial services for publishers, distributes grants for authors and publishers, and provides services for libraries. As of 2014-15, the Council distributed over £2.6 million in publishing grants across Welsh and English language publications.

=== Distribution Centre ===
The distribution centre has an annual turnover of around £3 million (net). By far the largest department of the WBC is the distribution centre. It has operated on a commercial basis without public subsidy, from its first year in 1966-67. The centre serves as Wales's largest book wholesaler and handles approximately 95% of books in Welsh published with Council grant support.

=== Digital Innovation ===
In 2021, the Council launched ffolio.wales, the first-ever bilingual platform to focus on selling e-books from Wales to the wider world. The not-for-profit site launched with more than 800 fiction and non-fiction titles for children and adults, as well as educational books for children in both Welsh and English.

== Awards and recognition ==
=== Tir na n-Og Awards ===
The Council organises the annual Tir na n-Og Awards, the oldest and most popular awards for children's literature in Wales. Established in 1976, the awards recognise, honour and promote excellence in books for children and young people. Three prizes of £1,000 each are awarded annually to overall winner in three categories.

The 2024 winners were:

- Welsh-language Primary: Jac a'r Angel by Daf James (Y Lolfa)
- Welsh-language Secondary: Astronot yn yr Atig by Megan Angharad Hunter (Y Lolfa)
- English-language: Where the River Takes Us by Lesley Parr (Bloomsbury)

=== Other Awards ===
In 2024, the Books Council introduced its brand-new Children's Book Cover of the Year Awards, which have two categories – Welsh-language Book Cover and English-language Book Cover.

== Funding and Financial Support ==
The Council receives its primary funding from the Welsh Government, supplemented by various grants and charitable sources. The Arts and Media Policy Division funding reached a peak of over £4.1m in 2010-11, with the 2014-15 total being £3.7m.

=== New Audiences Grant ===
The New Audiences Grant is funded by Welsh Government through Creative Wales. Its purpose is to strengthen and diversify the publishing industry in Wales. In 2024, applications totalling almost £1 million were received for the £500,000 fund.

The first year of the New Audiences Grant created opportunities for new collaborations and partnerships, with the total investment through the grant reaching over £1million and nearly 70 different projects across Wales.

== Notable staff ==
- Alun Creunant Davies: Director 1965–1987
- Gwerfyl Pierce Jones: Director 1987–2008
- Pedr ap Llwyd: Deputy Director 1990–2003
- Helgard Krause: Chief Executive 2017–

== Impact and Significance ==
According to a 2014 Welsh Government review, the Council creates or maintains roughly 1,000 skilled jobs, many of them in rural areas, and operates as Wales' biggest books wholesaler. The organisation plays a crucial role in maintaining Wales's distinct literary culture in both Welsh and English languages.
