= Alun Herbert Davies =

Welsh Books Council director (1927–2005)

Alun Herbert Davies (1927-2005), known as Alan Creunant in Wales, was a Welsh head teacher, and first director of the Welsh Books Council. His parents were Rev. Thomas Herbert (Creunant) Davies and Hannah Davies (née Thomas). On completing his secondary education in Llandovery he studied at Trinity College, Carmarthen, but did not enter the teaching profession until he had completed two years military service. Following a short period teaching in the Tregaron area, he moved to Llangeitho where, in 1952, he took up the position of school head teacher.

From 1965 to 1987 he held the position of Director of the Welsh Books Council. During this time he secured significant funding for the institution from local authorities and the Welsh Arts Council, and developed trading practices, introducing a wholesale operation for booksellers and publishers, and introducing services to help publishers improve standards of book production. He was also able to include in Books Council's remit the distribution of grants to improve and extend the variety of books published.

Davies' other great passion was religion, and he served as a lay preacher with the Presbyterian Church of Wales. He was also Moderator of the South Wales Association of the Presbyterian Church of Wales in 1979–1980.

In 1987 he received an honorary MA from the University of Wales, and in 2004 was made a Fellow of the University of Wales Aberystwyth.

He died from cancer at Bronglais Hospital, Aberystwyth, in October 2005.
