= Andrew Green (ghost hunter) =

British author (1927–2004)

- Born: 28 July 1927; Ealing, London
- Died: 21 May 2004 (aged 76); Robertsbridge, East Sussex
- Occupation: Ghost hunter

Andrew Green (28 July 1927 – 21 May 2004) was a British author and ghost hunter known by the media as "the Spectre Inspector". Although Green never claimed to have definitively seen a ghost, he hunted them for 60 years and helped to popularise the use of scientific methods in ghost hunting. He once famously hunted for ghosts in the Royal Albert Hall.

== Early life and education ==
Green was born in Ealing; his father was senior Air Raid Warden to the area. Green's interest in the paranormal was sparked when his father took him to an empty Victorian house in 1944. He later said that while visiting the house he was overcome by an unearthly voice who told him to jump out of the window. On investigation Green discovered that the house had been the site of twenty suicides over the previous sixty years. Green took a picture of the window he almost jumped from on his way out of the house. When it came back from the developers, Green discovered the face of a young girl in the window. This image would appear on many of his later book covers.

Green was educated at Borderstone Grammar School and received his science degree and masters in philosophy from the London School of Economics.

== Career ==
Green began hunting ghosts in the early forties and was known for his attempts to study ghosts from a scientific perspective. His paranormal investigations were interrupted by two years of national service in the army, but as soon as he was finished he began his paranormal career. In 1949, Green founded the Ealing Society for Psychical Research and in 1952 he co-founded the Lewisham Psychic Research Society and the National Federation of Psychic Research Societies; he continued his ghost investigations. During this time he also carried out ESP investigations and tested mediums. Nothing came of this research.

While investigating a well-known poltergeist in Battersea, which was active over a 12-year period from 1956, Green came across a letter supposedly written by the spirit. This earned him a Guinness Book of Records entry as the only person to own a "letter from a poltergeist". The letter was later found to be fraudulently written by the owners of the house.

After working as a magazine editor Green decided to create his own publishing company and soon published multiple volumes. In 1973, he published his first notable work, Our Haunted Kingdom which was a directory of all English ghosts who had been reported over the previous 25 years. In the same year however, he also published his definitive work, Ghost Hunting, a Practical Guide, which was the world's first book devoted to scientific ghost-hunting techniques including the use of thermometers and tape-recorders.

During this time, Green also appeared on Radio 4's programme You the Jury to debate the existence of ghosts, as well as appearing in the TV Times and Police Review.

Green was called in by numerous organisations as a consultant, including the Disney Corporation. In 2002 Green also gave advice to model Jordan regarding ghosts in her new home and in 2004 he advised singer Robbie Williams in a similar manner.

Every year Green would deliver a lecture on parapsychology at Pyke House, Battle and in 2003 he was honoured by their Ghost Club for his 60 years of research. Green also gave evening classes in parapsychology at Hastings College.

=== Royal Albert Hall ===
In 1996 Green was called on to investigate a haunting at the Royal Albert Hall. A caterer's porter had claimed seeing two ladies in the hall's basement who subsequently disappeared. Workmen also reported being harassed by an old man wearing a skull cap whenever they went to repair the organ. Eventually, Green was called by Mark Borkowski, the hall's PR consultant, who said he did not believe in ghosts, but that the workers were too nervous about the area.

Borkowski invited the media to Green's exorcism and instead of chasing ghosts Green spent the night answering questions posed by the media.

However, Green claimed that before the media had arrived he has noticed an anomaly in the temperature of the top floor, which was hotter over a spot where two workmen drowned in the Serpentine River, and that his bat recorder had picked up some noise.

== Personal life ==
Although he hunted ghosts for a living, Green did not believe in life after death and remained a staunch humanist throughout his life. Green never claimed to have seen a ghost, except for the ghost of a Fox Terrier in the early fifties, and even that he could never claim to be sure about.

Green met his second wife, Norah Cawthorne, through his investigations in 1976. They were married from 1979 until Green's death in May 2004.

== Bibliography ==
- Green, Andrew (1976). Ghost Hunting: A Practical Guide. Mayflower. p. 160. ISBN 0-583-12500-X.
- Green, Andrew (29 January 1976). Ghosts of the South East (Regional ghosts series). David & Charles PLC. p. 144. ISBN 0-7153-7092-8.
- Green, Andrew (18 April 1977). Phantom Ladies (Ghost hunters' library). Bailey Bros.& Swinfen Ltd. p. 157. ISBN 0-561-00295-9.
- Green, Andrew (1979). Haunted Houses (Shire Album No. 7). Shire Publications. p. 32. ISBN 9780852634608.
- Green, Andrew (1980). Ghostly Army, The (Macdonald ghosts). Macdonald Phoebus. p. 32. ISBN 0-356-06558-8.
- Green, Andrew (1980). Ghosts of Today. Kaye & Ward. p. 209. ISBN 0-7182-1255-X.
- Green, Andrew (2005). Unknown Ghosts of the South East. SB Publications. p. 112. ISBN 1-85770-313-8.
