= HiPACT (carbon capture) =

Carbon capture technology

HiPACT is a carbon capture and storage technology.
