= Ruth King (statistician) =

- Born: Pontypridd, South Wales
- Known for: Research in statistics with applications primarily within ecology, epidemiology or medicine

Ruth King (née Langham) FRSE FLSW is the current Thomas Bayes' Chair of Statistics in the School of Mathematics at the University of Edinburgh, having held the position since 2015. Prior to this she held positions at the University of Cambridge and the University of St Andrews.

Her main research interests are "Capture-recapture; Bayesian inference; hidden (semi-)Markov models; state-space models; missing data; applications in ecology and epidemiology".

Her research focuses on the development of novel statistical techniques applied to a range of different application areas, particularly within ecology, epidemiology or medicine. This research is often interdisciplinary in nature, relying on strong collaborative links with other researchers.

She was recognised by the Royal Society of Edinburgh as one of Scotland's leading female scientists in their exhibition and elected as a Fellow in 2018. She was also elected a fellow of the Learned Society of Wales in 2017, and a Fellow of the Institute of Mathematical Statistics in 2022.

== Career and research ==
She graduated with a BSc in Mathematics with Statistics in 1998, and completed a PhD in 2001, both from the University of Bristol. In her final year of undergraduate she was awarded the 'Henry Ronald Hasse Prize'. Her PhD was supervised by Steve Brooks.

Following her PhD she worked as a research associate at the University of Cambridge, from 2001 to 2003.

From 2003 to 2005, she was an EPSRC post-doctoral fellow.

From 2003 to 2010, she was a lecturer in Statistics at the University of St Andrews, then a reader in Statistics from 2010 to 2015.

Currently, she is the Thomas Bayes' Chair of Statistics at the University of Edinburgh, a post she has held since 2015.

She has spoken at numerous Conferences, in a number of countries, throughout her career.

In 2019, she co-organised the ICMS workshop on "Addressing Statistical Challenges of Modern Technological Advances" as well as the "Global Expert Working Group on Multiple Systems Estimation of Modern Slavery" in Edinburgh.

She has 69 publications on "Google Scholar" since 2001, with a total of 1370 citations since 2014 (as of June 2019), and 2213 citations overall.

Since 2017 she has been part of the team delivering the University of Edinburgh's 'Unlocking the World of Data' course on edX
