= List of revocations of the Legion of Honour =

The National Order of the Legion of Honour (French: Ordre national de la Légion d'honneur) is the highest and most prestigious French national order of merit, both military and civil. It was established in 1802 by Napoleon Bonaparte. The order has been retained by all subsequent French governments and regimes and is divided into five degrees of increasing distinction: Chevalier (Knight), Officier (Officer), Commandeur (Commander), Grand officier (Grand Officer) and Grand-croix (Grand Cross). Every year, an average of 2,000 French and 300 foreign nationals receive the decoration.

The honour can be withdrawn following criminal conviction or from someone who has “committed acts or behaved in such a way that could be declared dishonourable, or could damage the interests of France abroad, or causes that France supports”. In other cases, prominent nationals of countries with which the France has later found itself at war or in dispute have had their award revoked.

The National Order of Merit has stated that it typically waits for a "final condemnation" before an award is withdrawn, but in the 2017 revocation of Harvey Weinstein's award, Emmanuel Macron indicated that quicker action could sometimes be taken. Traditionally, the National Order of Merit does not publicly announce the revocation of the award and revocations are not published in the official journal of the Order, thus the total number of honours that have been withdrawn is not public knowledge.

== Honours revoked ==
Year awarded	Year revoked (Note: As the Legion of Honour organisation does not traditionally announce revocations of the award, the date may be when the revocations were reported in the media.)	Recipient		Country	Reason for revocation
Year awarded	Year revoked	Image	Name	Country	Reason for revocation
1901	1945		Philippe Pétain	France	Revoked after he was convicted of high treason and conspiring with the enemy following the end of World War II. He is the first head of state and President of France to have his award withdrawn.
1961	1998		Maurice Papon	France	Revoked after he was convicted of crimes against humanity for authorising the deportation of 1,690 Jews to Drancy internment camp from 1942 to 1944 during World War II. Evidence of his responsibility in the Holocaust began to emerge in 1981. He was tried in 1997 and convicted in 1998. Despite public outrage, he was buried with his Commandeur medal in 2007.
	2001		Paul Aussaresses	France	Revoked after admitting and defending the use of torture during the Algerian War in his 2001 book. Following the revelations, Jacques Chirac requested that his Commandeur award be withdrawn. He never regretted the use of torture. He was convicted for condoning war crimes and stated on the final day of his trial, "Sometimes it takes honor to digest dishonor."
1987	2010		Manuel Noriega	Panama	Revoked following his conviction for money laundering and extradition to France. The code was modified in 2010 to strip Noriega's award. He was the first foreigner and foreign head of state to have his award revoked.
2009	2012		John Galliano	United States	Revoked following his conviction for making anti-semitic remarks. He was fined €6,000 and his Chevalier award was withdrawn on 20 August 2012 by president François Hollande.
1987	2014		Lance Armstrong	United States	Revoked following a 2012 investigation into doping allegations that found that he used performance-enhancing drugs over his professional cycling career. In 2013, officials opened an inquiry for withdrawal of the award. In 2014, it was confirmed that his rank of Chevalier had been revoked.
2012	2017		Harvey Weinstein	United States	Revoked following widespread sexual abuse allegations against him. On October 15, 2017, Emmanuel Macron announced that he had "taken steps" to withdraw the award, stating that "Since these acts lack honor, we [should consider] all consequences."
2001	2018		Bashar al-Assad	Syria	Revoked following the Douma chemical attack. On 14 April 2018, France joined Britain and the United States in missile strikes against Syria after the use of chemical weapons by Assad's government against civilians. On the 17th, the Elysée announced that the formal process of revocation had begun. On the 20th, Syria's government returned the award to France, stating "It is no honour for President Assad to wear a decoration attributed by a slave country and follower of the United States that supports terrorists".
2007	2025		Nicolas Sarkozy	France	Revoked following Sarkozy's conviction for corruption in 2024, as any recipient sentenced to a term in prison equal to or greater than a year are excluded from the Order. President Macron opposed the decision, arguing that it was “very important that former presidents are respected”. Sarkozy is the second President of France to have his award withdrawn.

== See also ==
- List of revocations of appointments to orders and awarded decorations and medals of the United Kingdom
- List of foreign recipients of the Légion d'Honneur
