= Stanford G. Haughton =

English sound recordist/musician

Stanford G. Haughton was a sound recordist/musician who declined a knighthood in 1952. Some of the films he contributed to include: Star Trek, Hogan's Heroes, Search for a Dead Man and The Greatest Show on Earth.

In 1952 the Queen of the United Kingdom offered Haughton a New Year's Honour. He declined it.
