= Roy Curthoys =

Australian journalist (1892–1971)

Roy Curthoys CMG
- Born: 4 October 1892; Ballarat, Victoria, Australia
- Died: 24 September 1971 (aged 78); Prahran, Victoria, Australia
- Occupations: Journalist, newspaper editor

Roy Lancaster Curthoys CMG (4 October 1892 – 24 September 1971) was an Australian journalist and newspaper editor.

Curthoys was born in Ballarat and educated in Perth. He began his journalistic career on the Daily News in 1910, later transferring to the West Australian (1916), The Herald (1919), and The Argus (1920). He was a "leading member" of the Australian Journalists Association (AJA) and helped establish journalism courses at the University of Western Australia and the University of Melbourne. In 1922 he travelled through Europe and North America as a "special representative" of the AJA, learning about journalism education.

Curthoys was made assistant editor of The Argus in 1925 and editor in 1929. He resigned in 1935 due to a disagreement with the paper's management. For decades Curthoys also served as the Australian correspondent for overseas newspapers, including The Times (1927–1958) and The New York Times (1935–1957). He maintained a good relationship with Keith Murdoch, who gave him a free office and occasionally employed him as a leader writer. Curthoys was appointed CMG in 1958, after declining an Officer of the Order of the British Empire in 1951. He died in Melbourne in 1971, aged 78.
