= Coleg Cymraeg Cenedlaethol =

Welsh-medium education body

- Type: Public
- Established: March 2011
- Affiliations: University of Wales; AMBA; ACU; Universities UK; HiPACT; SEDA; HEA
- Vice-Chancellor: Andrew Green (Chair)
- Administrative staff: Dr Ioan Matthews (chief executive); Catherine Rees (company secretary); Dr Dafydd Trystan (registrar and senior academic manager)
- Location: Carmarthen, Wales, United Kingdom
- Website: www.colegcymraeg.ac.uk

Coleg Cymraeg Cenedlaethol (Welsh for 'Welsh national college'; sometimes shortened to just "Coleg") was established in 2011 by the Welsh Government to work with universities in Wales to develop Welsh-language courses and resources for students; it also provides and advances Welsh medium courses, scholarship and research in Welsh universities. Although headquartered in Carmarthen, the Coleg does not have its own campus, but works through a number of branches across universities in Wales. It is a recognised charity. The aim of the branches is to support the Coleg's work and act as a point of contact for students. The Chief Executive is Dr Ioan Matthews and the chair is Andrew Green.

All universities in Wales teach courses in Welsh; Aberystwyth, Cardiff, Bangor and Swansea universities have had chairs in Welsh since their establishment, and all their schools of Welsh are successful centres for the study of the Welsh language and its literature, offering a BA in Welsh as well as post-graduate courses.

Following a commitment made in the One Wales coalition government between Labour and Plaid Cymru, the Coleg Cymraeg Cenedlaethol was established. Since 2011, the Coleg has funded 115 lecturers who teach through the medium of Welsh in subjects ranging from Law, Modern Languages, Social Sciences and also other sciences such as Biosciences. There is also a Welsh-medium academic journal called Gwerddon which is a platform for academic research in Welsh and is published quarterly. The choice of Welsh-medium courses has grown significantly over recent years, There are currently (July 2013) over 500 different degrees available to Welsh-medium students, along with 150 undergraduate scholarships which are awarded to students each year.

This is the first time any organisation has planned Welsh-medium provision nationally for students. By working with all universities in Wales, the Coleg aims to strengthen existing courses and develop new degrees in new locations and disciplines across the country.

In April 2014, Coleg announced that it had appointed Marc Haynes as its Wikipedian in Residence.

== Gwerddon ==
Gwerddon is an academic e-journal which publishes scholarly research in the Arts, the Humanities and the Sciences twice a year and which conforms to the guidelines of the 2014 Research Excellence Framework. The journal tries to stimulate and encourage first-class academic discussion across as wide a range of subjects as possible through the medium of Welsh and thereby to create a store of material for the use of research students and academics.

The first edition was published in April 2007, and it has been an extremely important development in terms of ensuring that more and more Welsh medium academic research material is now published. Professor Ioan Williams is the editor of Gwerddon.

== Y Porth ==
The Porth learning platform allows universities to share Welsh-medium resources across Wales. Students are able to access a number of new resources, including:

- Open content resources which include a series of subject dictionaries for students
- Courses and modules which are relevant to specific degrees from Education to Biological Sciences
- A web gallery which contains relevant websites of interest to students who are studying subjects through the medium of Welsh
- Videos which provide information about specific areas.

== iTunes U ==
This is a special site for Welsh-medium students which offers courses and resources which can be downloaded to iPads, PCs and Mac computers through iTunes.

== Scholarships ==
Each year, the Coleg awards around 150 scholarships to undergraduate students who will be following degree courses in universities across Wales of which there are two types of scholarship – Lead Scholarships and Incentive Scholarships. The Lead Scholarships are for students who are studying at least two-thirds of their degree course through the medium of Welsh. These are worth £3,000 over three years (£1,000 a year). Nearly 300 different degree courses now contain enough Welsh-medium provision to be eligible for the Lead Scholarships.

Incentive Scholarships are available to students who intend to study a particular degree course in one of the ten following academic areas: Geography, Biology and Environmental Science, Business and Management, Social Work, Sports sciences and Studies, Law, Health Sciences, Modern Languages, Mathematics, Physics, Psychology and Chemistry. These scholarships offer £500 a year (or £1,500 over three years) for studying at least a third of the degree course through the medium of Welsh.

== See also ==
- Higher Education Funding Council for Wales
- List of universities in Wales
