= Andrew Green (librarian) =

British librarian

Andrew M. Green MCLIP, FLSW was a librarian and is a published author. He was born in Lincolnshire and was raised in Hoylandswaine in South Yorkshire, England. He initially worked in university libraries including the University College of Wales, Aberystwyth (1973–74), University College Cardiff (1975–89) and the University of Sheffield (1989–92). Upon leaving the University of Sheffield, he became the Director of Library and Information Services at the University of Wales, Swansea (1992–98). From 1998 to 2013, he became the 9th Librarian of the National Library of Wales in Aberystwyth. Green is fluent in the Welsh language. At the 2009 National Eisteddfod, the Gorsedd of Bards bestowed upon him the white bardic robes of a druid. His bardic name is Gwallter bach ("Little Walter").

== Public statements ==
In 2005, Green criticised the Welsh Tourist Board for the way it advertised Wales, using old-fashioned and stereotypical concepts of the country. He suggested that Wales could benefit from attracting genealogy tourists to use the materials available at the National Library, in the same way as Ireland successfully attracts expatriates from the United States to visit the country and research their origins.

== Public life ==
Green belongs to multiple scholarly organizations, including SCONUL (the Society of College, National and University Libraries) (Chair 2002–2004), The Legal Deposit Advisory Panel, the Committee of the ALDL (Agency for the Legal Deposit Libraries), the Research Information Network Funders' Group, the CyMAL Advisory Council, the Chartered Institute of Library and Information Professionals (CILIP) Wales (President), the Wales Higher Edducation Libraries Forum (WHELF) (Chair), and the Welsh Committee of the British Council. He was a member of the steering bodies of the Research Support Libraries Programme (RSLP) and the Research Support Libraries Group (RSLG).

In 2009 Green was honoured by the Gorsedd of Bards at the National Eisteddfod with the white bardic robes of a druid, the highest honour bestowed for his contribution to the language and culture of Wales. His bardic name is Gwallter bach, which alludes to Little Walter, the great American blues player. In 2013, Green was elected as a Fellow of the Learned Society of Wales. Between 2014 and 2017, he was the Chair of Coleg Cymraeg Cenedlaethol, an organisation that aims to establish the future sustainability of the Welsh language within academia.

== Publications ==
=== Articles ===
1990s

- 1994. "Staff appraisal in university libraries". Library and Information Research. 18 (60): 34–38.

2000s

- 2002. "Digital library, open library: developments in the National Library of Wales". Alexandria. 14 (3): 161–170. doi:10.1177/095574900201400305.
- 2005. "Wales on the Web" (PDF). The Gregynog papers. 4 (One). Cardiff: Institute of Welsh Affairs.
- 2007. Osmond, John (ed.). "The future of national libraries and archives". Myths, memories and futures The National Library and National Library in the Story of Wales (PDF). Cardiff: Institute of Welsh Affairs. ISBN 1 904 773 20 6.
- 2008. "Theatres of memory". New Welsh Review. 80 (Summer): 8–16.
- 2008. (With Richard Gibby) "Electronic legal deposit in the United Kingdom". New Review of Academic Librarianship. 14 (1–2): 55–70. 2008.

2010s

- 2010. "Big digitisation: origins, progress and prospects". International Journal of Humanities and Arts Computing. 4 (1–2): 55–66. doi:10.3366/ijhac.2011.0007.
- 2012. "Introducing electronic legal deposit in the UK: A Homeric tale". Alexandria. 23 (3): 105–109.
- 2014. "Sir John Williams and the National Library of Wales". Carmarthenshire Antiquary. 50: 68–79.
- 2019. "University challenged". Planet. 235 (Autumn): 12–18.

2020s

- 2021. "Welsh keywords: treftadaeth". Planet. 242 (May–August): 51–57.
- 2022. "With a pencil you can redraw the world". Planet. 246 (May–August): 67–73.

=== Chapters ===
- 2007. 'The future of national libraries and archives'. Chapter 7 in Myths, memories and futures The National Library and National Museum in the story of Wales. Edited by John Osmond. Cardiff: Institute of Welsh Affairs. ISBN 1-904-773-20-6
- 2008. 'Knowledge capital'. In Essays on Aberystwyth / Photos by Keith Morris. By Keith Morris et al. Llandysul, Ceredigion: Gomer. ISBN 9781843239406
- 2011. 'The place of place'. In Clive Hicks-Jenkins. By Simon Callow et al. London: Lund Humphries. ISBN 978-1848220829

=== Books ===
- 2014. In the Chair How to guide groups and manage meetings. Cardigan, Ceredigion: Parthian. ISBN 978-1909844780.
- 2018. Wales in 100 Objects. Llandysul, Ceredigion: Gomer Press. ISBN 9781785621581.

Academic offices
Preceded by J. Lionel Madden	Librarian of the National Library of Wales; 1998 – 2013	Succeeded by Aled Gruffydd Jones
