= HiPACT (association) =

Association of British universities

HiPACT was an association of British universities which was formed in 1991 with an aim of widening participation in higher education.
