= Learned Society of Wales =

Learned society headquartered in Cardiff, Wales

The Learned Society of Wales
- Cymdeithas Ddysgedig Cymru
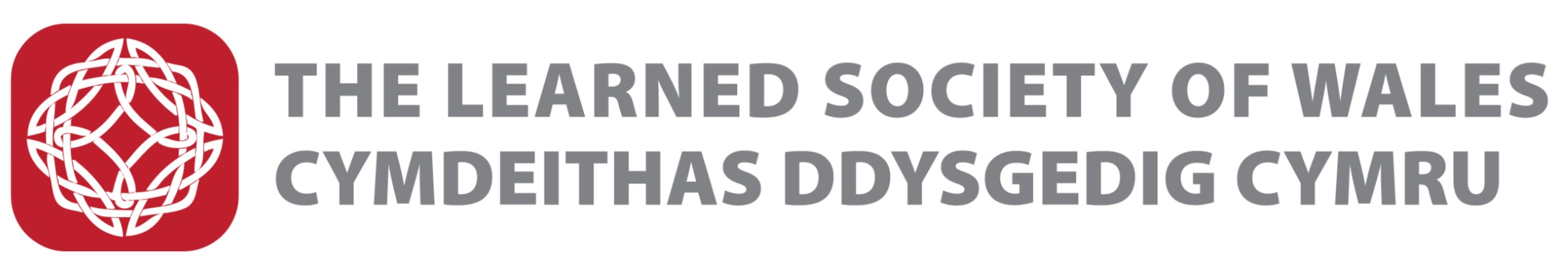
- Formation: 25 May 2010; 16 years ago
- Type: Learned Society; National Academy
- Registration no.: 1168622
- Legal status: Charity
- Purpose: To advance education, learning, academic study and knowledge, so as to contribute to scientific, cultural, social, environmental and economic development within Wales and beyond
- Headquarters: Cardiff, Wales, United Kingdom
- Official languages: English; Welsh
- Activities: Research & Publications, Policy advice, Lectures & Events
- Patron: HM The King
- President: Hywel Thomas
- Award: Fellowship of the Learned Society
- Website: learnedsociety.wales

The Learned Society of Wales (Welsh: Cymdeithas Ddysgedig Cymru) is a national academy, learned society and charity that exists to "celebrate, recognise, preserve, protect and encourage excellence in all of the scholarly disciplines", and to serve the Welsh nation.

The Learned Society of Wales is Wales's first and only all-embracing national scholarly academy. A registered charity, it was established and launched on 25 May 2010 at the National Museum of Wales and was granted a Royal Charter in 2015. The society is headquartered in Cardiff.

It is an independent, self-governing, pan-disciplinary, bilingual organisation operating throughout Wales, and is a founding member of the Celtic Academies Alliance.

== Purpose ==
The Society describes its mission as to:

- Celebrate, recognise, preserve, protect, and encourage excellence in all scholarly disciplines, and in the professions, industry and commerce, the arts and public service.
- Promote the advancement of learning, scholarship, and the dissemination and application of the results of academic enquiry and research.
- Act as an independent source of expert scholarly advice and comment on matters affecting the research, scholarship and well-being of Wales and its people, and to advance public discussion and interaction on matters of national and international importance.

== History ==
The Learned Society of Wales was established in 2010 (more than 225 years after the establishment of the Royal Society of Edinburgh, for example, and nearly 350 years after the establishment of the Royal Society in London). The creation of a national academy of learning was a subject of interest and discussion in Wales for some years before then but the idea was taken forward practically only in 2008, when a group of some twenty independent scholars representing the major academic disciplines came together to address the lack of a learned academy in Wales. They formed themselves into a Shadow Council for what they decided should become the Learned Society of Wales and identified further eminent scholars (almost all of them Fellows of the Royal Society or of the British Academy) who, along with the original group, became the society's sixty Founding Fellows.

In February 2010, Sir John Cadogan was elected to serve as the Society's Inaugural President and Chair of Council and, on 18 May 2010, having operated in shadow form for some months before then, the Learned Society of Wales was incorporated as a company limited by guarantee. One week later, on 25 May 2010, the Society was formally launched during a ceremony held at the National Museum in Cardiff.

The University of Wales provided a grant, office space and other infrastructure facilities at the outset and has continued to support the society. Since 2015/17, all of the country's universities have been providing financial support. Their grants are treated as contributions towards the core costs of the society and as part of its unrestricted funds, thereby ensuring the Society remains fully independent. In 2015/16, grants from the universities comprised nearly three-quarters (£217,000) of the Society's income.

== Fellowship ==
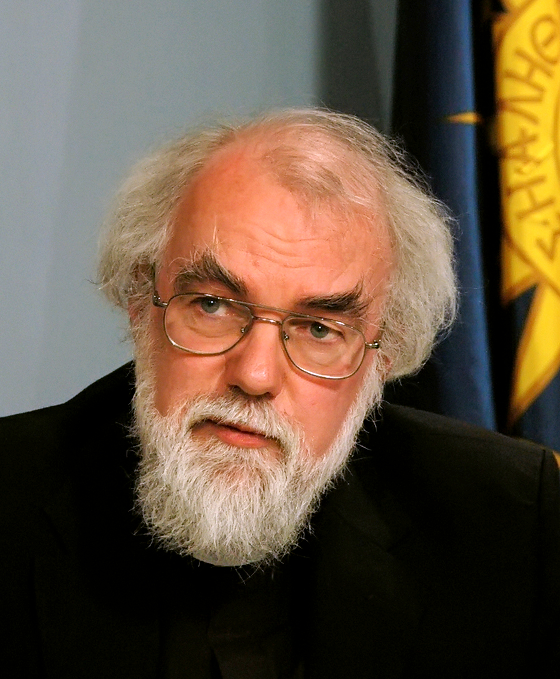
Rowan Williams, Fellow of the Learned Society of Wales

Main pages: Category: Fellows of the Learned Society of Wales

The Learned Society of Wales has more than 700 Fellows, individuals from all branches of learning. Fellows of the Learned Society of Wales are entitled to refer to themselves as such and use the initials FLSW after their name.

Fellowship of the Society is open to Welsh residents, those born in Wales or with a particular connection to Wales, who have a "demonstrable record of excellence and achievement" in academia, or who have made a distinguished contribution to knowledge in their professional field. Fellows are elected following a rigorous process of peer review. Nominations are proposed, and seconded, by existing Fellows of the Society. The nomination papers of each candidate are then considered by the relevant Scrutiny Committee, prior to further consideration by the Council and submission to the Fellowship as a whole for confirmation and formal election.

Scrutiny Committees, made up of Fellows, operate in the following areas:

- Medicine and Medical Sciences
- Cellular, Molecular, Evolutionary, Organismal and Ecosystem Sciences
- Chemistry, Physics, Astronomy and Earth Sciences
- Computing, Mathematics and Statistics
- Engineering
- Language, Literature and the history and theory of the Creative and Performing Arts
- History, Philosophy and Theology
- Economic and Social Sciences, Education and Law
- General

Elections have been held each year since the Inaugural Election of Fellows in 2011, when 119 new Fellows joined the Society's ranks, and, as of 2024, the Society has more than 700 Fellows.

== Dillwyn Medals ==
The Society's Dillwyn Medals recognise early career research excellence. The winners are:

=== 2024 ===
- Sciences, Technology, Engineering, Mathematics and Medicine: Laura Richardson
- Humanities and Creative Arts: Alix Beeston
- Social Sciences, Education and Business: Roxanna Dehaghani

=== 2023 ===
- Sciences, Technology, Engineering, Mathematics and Medicine: Iestyn Woolway
- Humanities and Creative Arts:Rebecca Thomas
- Social Sciences, Education and Business:Leighton Evans

=== 2022 ===
- Sciences, Technology, Engineering, Mathematics and Medicine: Erminia Calabrese
- Humanities and Creative Arts:Sharon Thompson
- Social Sciences, Education and Business:Hayley Young

=== 2021 ===
- Sciences, Technology, Engineering, Mathematics and Medicine:Emrys Evans
- Humanities and Creative Arts:Ben Guy
- Social Sciences, Education and Business:Annie Tubadji

=== 2020 ===
- Sciences, Technology, Engineering, Mathematics and Medicine:Jennifer Edwards
- Humanities and Creative Arts:Gwennan Higham
- Social Sciences, Education and Business:Rebecca Dimond

=== 2017 ===
- Sciences, Technology, Engineering, Mathematics and Medicine:Rachel Evans
- Humanities and Creative Arts:Amanda Rogers
- Social Sciences, Education and Business:Rhiannon Evans

== Presidents ==
- 2010–14 Sir John Cadogan
- 2014–2020 Sir Emyr Jones Parry
- 2020–present Professor Hywel Thomas

== Fellows ==
Past Fellows include:

- Sir David (Den) Davies
- John Davies
- R. Geraint Gruffydd
- Noel Lloyd, CBE
- Brynley F. Roberts
- Meic Stephens
- Gwyn Thomas
- Howard Thomas
- Kenneth Walters
- Chris Williams

Current Fellows include:

- Barbara Adam
- Catherine Barnard
- Hagan Bayley
- Deirdre Beddoe
- Kirsti Bohata
- Jing (Maggie) Chen
- Tom Crick
- David Crystal
- Ian Diamond
- Menna Elfyn
- The Baroness Finlay of Llandaff
- Haley Gomez
- Andrew Green
- Mererid Hopwood
- Medwin Hughes
- Ronald Hutton
- Rhiannon Ifans
- Sir Simon Jenkins
- Ann John
- Ruth King
- Geraint F. Lewis
- Gwyneth Lewis
- David Lloyd Jones, Lord Lloyd-Jones
- John Loughlin
- Peredur Lynch
- Laura McAllister
- Paul Mealor
- Angela Mihai
- Kenneth O. Morgan
- Dame Elan Closs Stephens
- Dame Helen Stokes-Lampard
- Mark Taubert
- Elaine Treharne
- Meena Upadhyaya
- Alasdair Whittle
- Llŷr Williams
- Rowan Williams, Baron Williams of Oystermouth

== See also ==
- UK Young Academy
