= Shareen Doak =

Nanogenotoxicologist

Shareen Heather Doak
- Born: 1 December 1978 (age 47)

Academic background
- Education: Swansea University
- Doctoral advisor: Jim Parry; Liz Parry

Academic work
- Discipline: Toxicology
- Sub-discipline: Nanotoxicology
- Institutions: Swansea University Medical School

Shareen Heather Doak FLSW (born 1 December 1978) is a professor who holds a personal chair in Genotoxicology and Cancer at Swansea University and is a leading female British scientist in the field of Nanotoxicology globally.

== Education ==
Doak was educated in Saudi Arabia in her early years before returning to the UK to complete her A levels at St. Michaels School in Llanelli, South Wales. She studied for a Bachelor of Science (BSc) in genetics at Swansea University, and obtained a 1st class honors degree in 2000. Remaining at Swansea University, Doak completed her PhD in oncology and cancer biology at the genetics department in 2003 under the supervision of Professor Jim Parry and Dr. Liz Parry.

== Career ==
After working for a short period as a post-doctoral researcher and genetics tutor at Swansea University, on research projects including biomarkers for prostate cancer and identifying thresholds dose-response for direct-acting genotoxins, Doak gained a Research Councils UK (RCUK) Academic Fellowship in 2007 which was supported by both the Swansea University Medical School and the Swansea University College of Engineering at Swansea University. In 2014, Doak was promoted to a personal chair in Genotoxicology and Cancer, as one of the youngest scientists to be awarded a professorship at Swansea University. Alongside her research projects in nano(geno)toxicology, In Vitro toxicology, and prostate cancer, Doak is director of the Centre for NanoHealth at Swansea University Medical School]as well as being a UK and EUROTOX Registered Toxicologist. In 2018, Doak was elected a Fellow of the Learned Society of Wales.

=== Recent grants ===
Year	Grant
2017	Celtic Advanced Life Science Innovation Network (CALIN) - €11.96M
2017	Physiologically Anchored Tools for Realistic nanOmateriaL hazard aSsessment (PATROLS) - €13M
