= Ann John =

Ann John OBE FLSW FMedSci
- Employer: Swansea University
- Known for: Adolescent mental health, Suicide and Self-harm prevention

Ann John OBE FLSW FMedSci holds a personal chair in Public Health and Psychiatry at Swansea University Medical School. She is a clinical academic with a background in public health and general practice. Her research focuses on suicide and self-harm prevention and children and young peoples' mental health. She is Principal Investigator and Co-Director of DATAMIND and Director of the National Centre for Suicide Prevention and Self-harm Research (the independent advisory body to Welsh Government for the Wales Suicide Prevention Strategy).

John focuses on the translation of research into policy and practice. She chaired the Committee which produced the BSI Suicide Prevention in the Workplace standard (BS30480). She is a trustee of MQ and the Youth Endowment Fund. She chairs the Royal Foundation National Suicide Prevention Network. She has led and been involved in the development of several government and NHS-commissioned reports, policy documents and community resources.

John has advised on a number of media storylines including Coronation Street, Hollyoaks and This is Going to Hurt and works with the Samaritans Media Advisory Service on responsible reporting of suicide. She is Vice President of the International Association of Suicide Prevention (2025-present).She chaired the National Advisory Group to the Welsh Government on the prevention of suicide and self-harm (2014-2024). She also serves as an honorary consultant in Public Health Medicine for Public Health Wales.

In 2019, John was elected as a Fellow of the Learned Society of Wales.. In 2022 she was awarded the Frances Hoggan Medal. She was elected a Fellow of the Academy of Medical Sciences in 2026.

== Education ==
John's parents arrived in London from Kerala in 1966. She was born and grew up in London. She was educated at Haberdashers' Aske's School for Girls and then Charing Cross and Westminster Medical School, where she qualified as a doctor. During her medical degree, she intercalated to study sociology, which began an interest in the impacts of deprivation, exclusion and inequalities. She earned a Medical Doctorate at Swansea University in 2011, where she established a Suicide and Self-Harm research group.
