= Amy Brown =

Amy Brown may refer to:

- Amy Brown (dietitian), Welsh professor of child public health at Swansea University
- Amy Brown (royal mistress) (1783–1876), English mistress of Charles Ferdinand, Duke of Berry
