= Catherine Thornton =

Australian immunologist and academic

Catherine Thornton is Professor of Human Immunology and Head of Swansea University Medical School. She is Designated Individual for the Medical School’s HTA Human Tissue Research Licence. Thornton is the Swansea University representative on the Management and Executive Boards of the Life Sciences Research Network for Wales.

== Education and early career ==
Born in Australia, Thornton achieved her Bachelor of Science (Honours) at the University of Tasmania. Thornton completed her PhD studies at Flinders University of South Australia. On completion she was awarded a NH&MRC CJ Martin Post-Doctoral Training Fellowship that took her to the University of Southampton, followed by the University of Western Australia and appointment as a senior lecturer at Swansea University in 2003. Catherine is also a member of the International Inflammation Network.

== Research interests ==
Thornton’s core research interest is the antenatal determinants of immune health in childhood. This encompasses work on the immune response in pregnancy, especially of the placenta, and post-natal development of immune function in early life with a special interest in the impact of maternal obesity. Thornton’s skills in immunological assays support collaborative efforts to improve the design and utility of blood handling devices, and the development of novel blood-based diagnostics.
