= Jitendra Nath Pande =

Indian pulmonologist (1941–2020)

- Born: 14 June 1941; Shikohabad, India
- Died: 23 May 2020 (aged 78); New Delhi, India
- Education: MBBS and MD (Medicine) from AIIMS, New Delhi
- Occupations: Senior Consultant (Medicine) at Sitaram Bhartia Institute of Science & Research and former Professor & Head of Medicine, AIIMS, New Delhi
- Spouse: Yvette Pande
- Parent(s): Shri Madan Mohan Pande and Smt. Kamla Devi Pande
- Awards: Padma Shri

Jitendra Nath Pande or J. N. Pande (14 June 1941 – 23 May 2020) was an Indian Pulmonologist and Professor and Head of Medicine at the All India Institute of Medical Studies (AIIMS). He was working as Senior Consultant (Medicine) at Sitaram Bhartia Institute of Science & Research, New Delhi. He died on 23 May 2020 during sleep when he was home quarantined due to COVID-19 positivity during the COVID-19 pandemic in India, in New Delhi.

He was posthumously awarded India's fourth highest civilian award, the Padma Shri in 2021.

== Personal and family details ==
Pande was born in Shikohabad, India, to Shri Madan Mohan Pande and Smt. Kamla Devi Pande. His parents were from Uttar Pradesh.

He was younger brother of Prof. Gyan N Pande, Emeritus Professor, Swansea University and President, International Centre for Computational Engineering.

== Education ==
Pande obtained both his MBBS in 1963 and MD (Medicine) in 1966 degrees from AIIMS, New Delhi.

== Work and important assignments ==
Pande specialised in respiratory medicine and clinical epidemiology. He set up the first intensive care unit in India.

He treated many famous personalities from public life like President of India, Prime Minister of India, politicians, etc. Some of his famous patients are former Power Minister Rangarajan Kumaramangalam, Raj Kapoor.

Important assignments of Pande include:

- Personal doctor to the President of India.
- Director Clinical Epidemiology Unit, All India Institute Medical Sciences, New Delhi
- Chief, SRB Center of Clinical Pharmacology, Department of Medicine, All India Institute Medical Sciences, New Delhi
- Head, Department of Medicine, All India Institute of Medical Sciences, New Delhi
- Professor, All India Institute of Medical Sciences, New Delhi
- Associate Professor, All India Institute Medical Sciences, New Delhi
- Assistant Professor, All India Institute Medical Sciences, New Delhi
- Member, Review Committee Bhopal Gas Disaster.

== Research impact ==
The 1997–98 study of Pande titled 'Outdoor air pollution and emergency room visits at a hospital in Delhi' was cited by Supreme Court of India in its CNG judgement.

== Publication ==
Pande published more than 170 papers in national and international journals apart from delivering many prestigious orations.

== Awards ==
Pande was conferred many prestigious awards, some of them are mentioned below:

- Padma Shri by Government of India
- Emeritus Professor by National Academy of Medical Sciences
- Ranbaxy Science by Foundation Award
- Sri Omprakash Bhasin by Foundation Award in Health and Technology

== Honors ==
- Council Member, National Academy of Medical Sciences.
- Fellow, National Academy of Medical Sciences.
- Fellow, National Academy of Sciences
- Guest Editor, The Indian Journal of Medical Research (IJMR)
- Speaker, NCCP (I) – Prof. Raman Vishwanathan Memorial Chest Oration, Amritsar, 1995 (Previously known as Raman Vishwanathan Memorial Oration / Lecture)
- Fellow, National College Chest Physicians
- Member, Indian Council Medical Research
- Vice President, Chest Institute
- Member, Chest Institute
- Vice President, Indian Council Medical Research
- Editor, Indian Journal Chest Diseases and Allied Sciences
- Editor, Annals of National Academy Medical Sciences
