= Wallace Building, Swansea =

Wallace Building
- Adeilad Wallace
- Former names: Natural Sciences Building

General information
- Location: Singleton Park, Swansea
- Country: Wales
- Coordinates: 51.6084°N 3.981°W
- Named for: Alfred Russel Wallace
- Year(s) built: 1953-1961
- Owner: Swansea University

Technical details
- Floor count: 2

Design and construction
- Architect(s): Percy Thomas Partnership
- Designations: Grade II

The Wallace Building is a Grade-II Swansea University building, in Singleton Park, Swansea.

== History ==
The building was conceived by Professor Florence Mockeridge, head of Biology Department and was designed by the Percy Thomas Partnership in the 1950s as part of the campus development. The first phase was completed in 1953 with the additional wings completed by 1961. The building was formerly known as the Natural Sciences Building but was rededicated after Alfred Russel Wallace.

It was built in the classical-modernist style with a long northeast to southwest range with two shorter wings.

The building is home to geography, geology, botany, and zoology departments, which are depicted in a band of panels containing cast emblems symbolizing these subjects.

== Location ==
The building lies to the South West of the Fulton Lawn in Singleton Park, Swansea.
