= Swansea University Medical School =

Medical school in Wales

Coordinates: 51.610°N 3.980°W

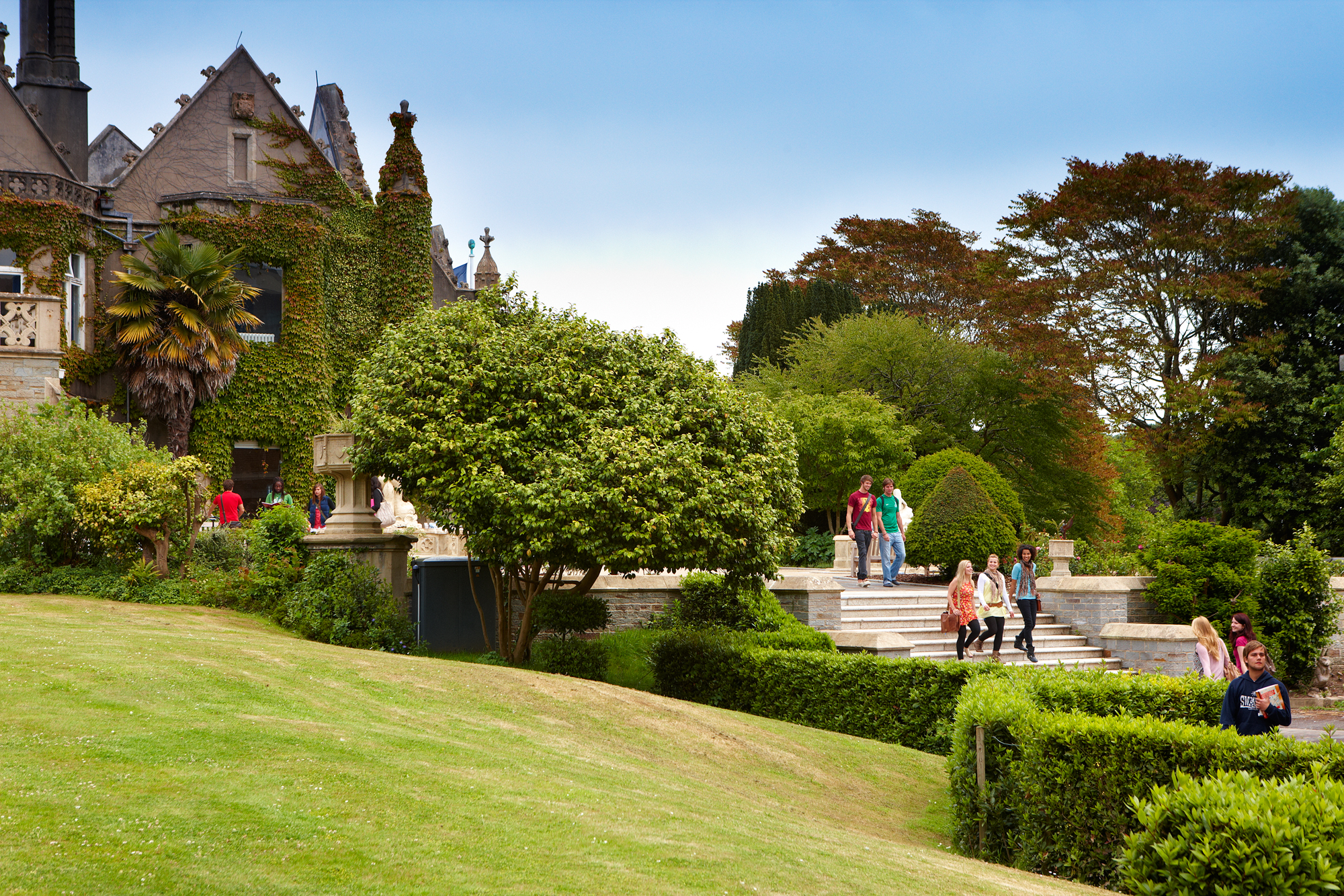
- Motto: "Gweddw crefft heb ei dawn" – Technical skill is bereft without culture
- Type: Medical school
- Established: 2004
- Dean: Professor Catherine Thornton
- Faculty: 130
- Undergraduates: 690
- Postgraduates: 200
- Location: Swansea, United Kingdom
- Website: http://www.swansea.ac.uk/medicine/

Swansea University Medical School is a medical school on Swansea University's Singleton campus. It is linked to additional teaching centres located throughout South and West Wales, including Cefn Coed Hospital, Singleton Hospital and Morriston Hospital in Swansea, Prince Philip Hospital in Llanelli, Withybush General Hospital in Haverfordwest and Bronglais Hospital in Aberystwyth. The Medical School also has a network of primary care (General Practice) teaching centers.

Swansea University Medical School is ranked as the 13th best medical school in the UK by the Complete University Guide 2025. Swansea University is the top university in Wales in The Times and The Sunday Times Good University Guide 2017 league table – and has also won the inaugural Welsh University of the Year title.

The Medical School leads a four-year graduate entry medicine degree (MB BCh) alongside BSc degrees in Applied Medical Sciences, Genetics, and Biochemistry. The school also teaches higher degree programmes, including PhD, MD, MCh and master's degrees. In 2017, the Graduate Entry Medicine degree was featured in the QS World University Rankings for the first time.

Swansea University Medical School employs four core activities; Learning and Teaching, Research, Enterprise and Innovation and collaboration with the NHS.

In January 2017, the British Heart Foundation relocated to Swansea University Medical School and housed itself in the Institute of Life Science. In March, the Medical School announced a new partnership with Pfizer which involves the pharmaceutical company locating itself at the university's Bay Campus.

== History ==
Swansea University first attempted to establish a medical school in the 1960s but initially missed out on other schools. The university did succeed in introducing Genetics and Biochemistry departments, laying the foundations for future expansion into medicine.

Following Welsh political devolution in the 1990s, fresh calls were made to establish a medical school to serve the people of southwest Wales. In 2001, the Welsh Government established a medical school at the university's Singleton Park campus. By 2004, the clinical school had developed into the School of Medicine, welcoming its first students onto the Graduate Entry Medicine course – a 4-year fast-track graduate entry programme in 2004 in collaboration with Cardiff University.

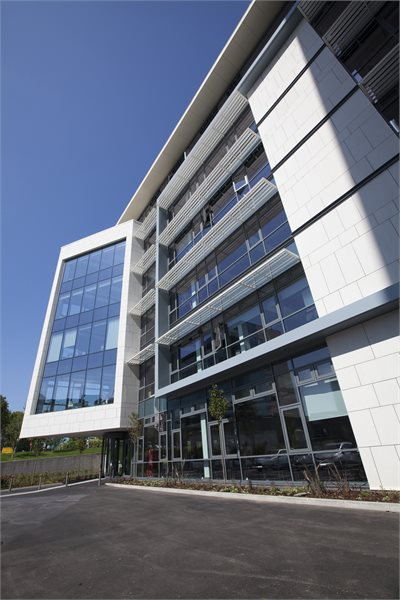
Swansea University Medical School – Data Science building

The Medical School has undergone considerable expansion, with the opening of the Institute of Life Science 1 (ILS1) in 2007, and the Institute of Life Science 2 in 2012.

A Centre for NanoHealth, the first of its kind in Europe opened in 2011 for research into NanoHealth technologies.

In 2012 ILS2 became home to one of 4 UK centres for eHealth Research (HeRCs) funded by a Medical Research Council-led consortium of funders. The college also hosts the EPSRC National Mass Spectrometry Service.

The 2014 Research Excellence Framework gave the Medical School a glowing report, ranking it joint 1st as the best research environment in the UK and 2nd in the UK for overall research quality.

The new Data Science building was opened in 2015.

In 2016, Swansea University Medical School was awarded the Athena SWAN Silver award, making it the first department in the university to achieve the prize, dedicated to promoting equality in the workforce.

In March 2017, a number of new developments were announced as part of the ARCH project, including two new Institutes of Life Science, and the Llanelli Wellness & Life Science Village

== Research ==
The Institute of Life Science (ILS) is the research and innovation arm of the Medical School. It comprises two purpose built research facilities (ILS1 and ILS2) which represent an £80 million investment at Swansea University's Singleton Park campus in Swansea, equipped with an IBM Blue-C supercomputer.

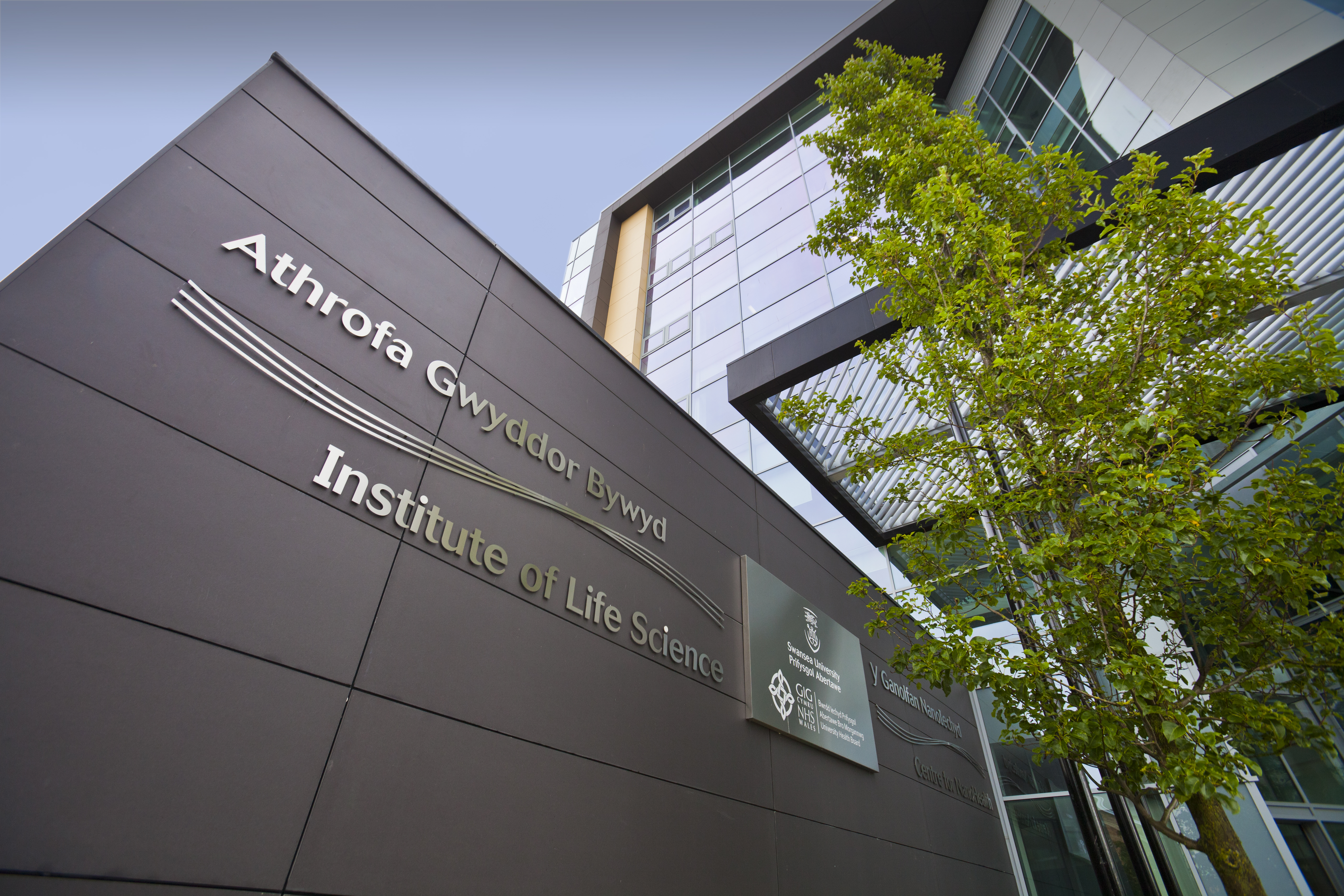
Swansea University Medical School – Institute of Life Science 2

In the 2008 Research Assessment Exercise, 87% of staff in the school were assessed as producing research of international quality or above.

The school currently employs 4 main research themes Biomarkers & Genes, Devices, Microbes & Immunity Patient & Population Healthy. These themes are centred around the main research facilities, including Biomedical Laboratories, Informatics, the Institute of Mass Spectrometry, the Centre for NanoHealth, Commercial Incubators and the Joint Clinical Research Facility.

== Graduate Entry Medicine ==
Swansea University Medical School provides one of a small number of Graduate Entry Medicine programmes currently available in the UK. The course is also unique for being open to graduates of any discipline who meet the entry requirements of the school, which includes the GAMSAT exam (UK/EU and international students) or the MCAT exam (international students only). Traditionally restricted to UK and EU applicants, the course is now open to candidates from around the world.

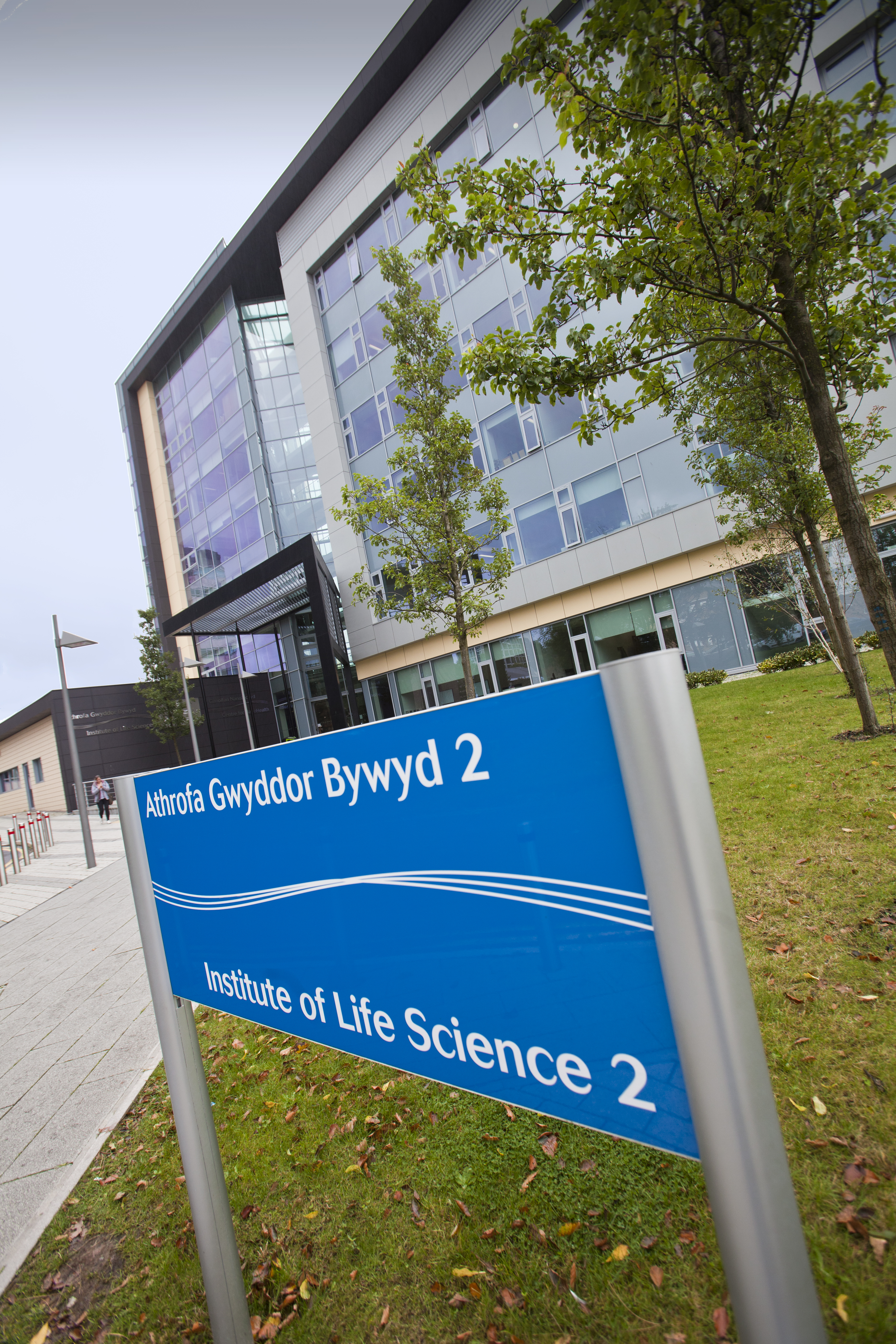
Institute of life sciences

The 4-year programme, which combines learning weeks and clinical placements, doesn't adhere to the traditional 'body systems' approach but attempts to imitate clinical practice methods regarding how clinicians approach patients and vice versa. To allow students to hone their skills, it provides early and continued exposure clinical practice through learning opportunities in the clinical setting (LOCS), community-based learning, clinical apprenticeships and speciality attachments.

In March 2017, the MBBCh Graduate Entry Medicine degree was announced as featuring in the QS World University Rankings.

In June 2021, Swansea University Medical School was ranked 1st in the UK by the Complete University Guide.

In August 2022, it was announced that the course would expand by 25 places to 142. This followed a previous increase of 25 places in 2021.

== Undergraduate courses ==
Swansea University Medical School currently offers six undergraduate courses

- BSc Applied Medical Sciences
- BSc Biochemistry
- BSc Genetics
- BSc Medical Biochemistry
- BSc Medical Genetics
- BSc Medical Pharmacology
- Bsc Population Health and Medical Sciences
- BSc Biochemistry & Genetics

As part of a commitment to widening access, many of these courses include a Pathway to Medicine, feeder modules for access to {MBBCh]] Graduate Entry Medicine as well as Foundation Year programmes.

== Postgraduate courses ==
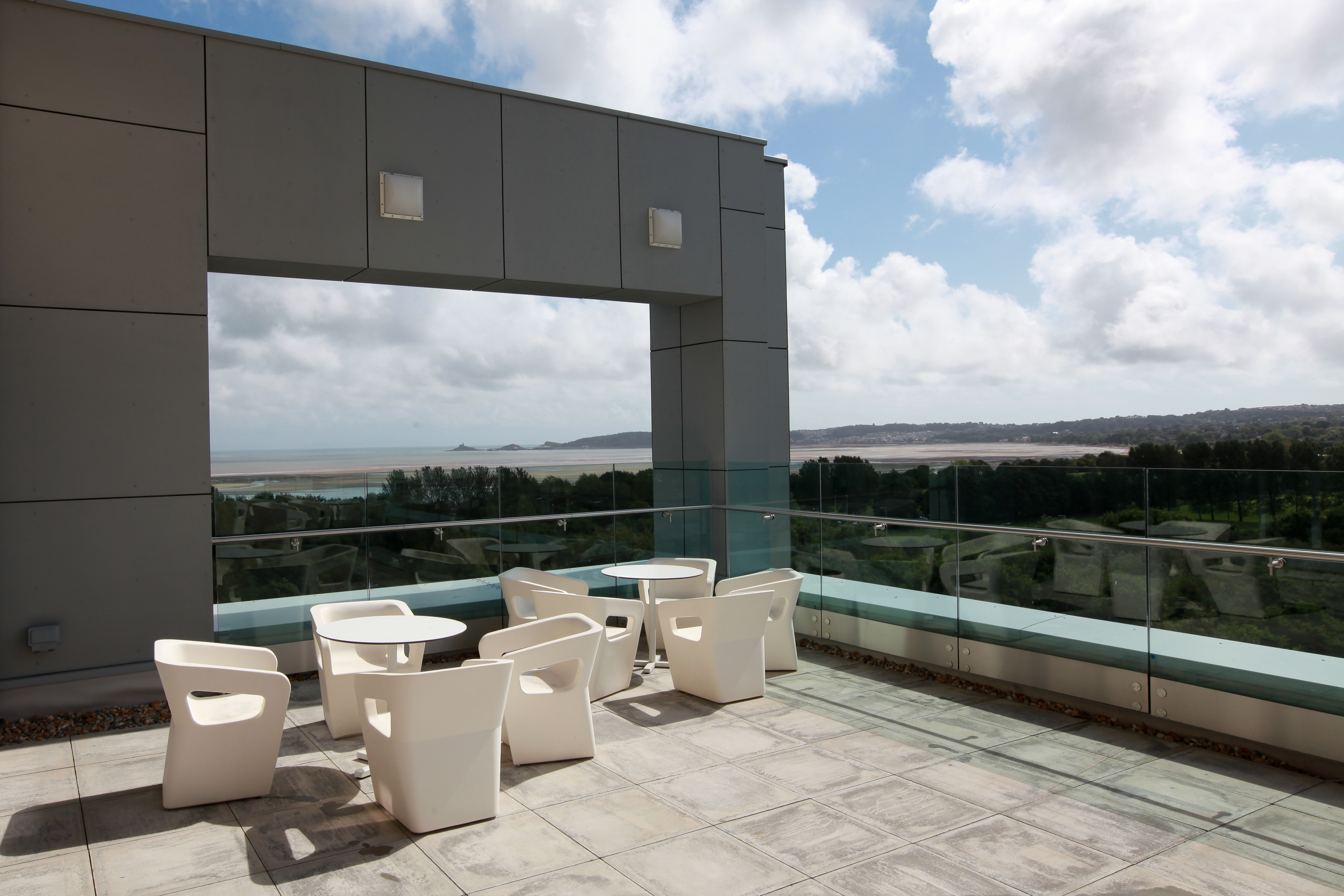
View of Mumbles from ILS2, Swansea University Medical School

Swansea University Medical School has a range of postgraduate taught programmes, including:

- Diabetes Practise
- Genomic Medicine
- Health Data Science
- Health Informatics
- Leadership for the Health Professions (with distance learning option)
- Medical Education (with distance learning option)
- Medical Radiation Physics
- Nanomedicine
- Physician Associate Studies

The medical school also offers research degrees including D.Prof, MRes, Masters by Research, MPhil, MD and PhD.

== Societies ==
Swansea University Medical School has a number of student-led societies, including the Medical Society (the society for the Graduate Entry Medicine programme), the Medical Life Science Society (aimed at all undergraduate and postgraduate degrees) and others including GP Society, Surgical Society, and the Swansea Gambia Link.

== ARCH ==
Swansea University Medical School is a central part of ARCH, A Regional Collaboration for Health. The medical school has ambitious plans to work closely with Abertawe Bro Morgannwg University Health Board and Hywel Dda to transform home and hospital care across the region, including the continued investment in Singleton and Morriston Hospitals, and the development of a multi-million pound Medi-Park

== Notable academics ==
- Keith Lloyd, Dean & Head of Medical School. Chair of Welsh Psychiatric society.
- Julian Hopkin CBE, Founder of Medical School. Awarded CBE in 2011 for service to medicine.
- Shareen Doak Chair of Genotoxicology and Cancer.
- Professor Catherine Thornton Head of Medical School. Member of Management and Executive Boards of the Life Sciences Research Network for Wales.
- Ronan Lyons Clinical Professor of Public Health. Director of the National Centre for Population Health and Wellbeing Research. Director of the Farr Institute Centre for the Improvement of Population Health.
- Martin Sheldon Professor of Reproductive Immunobiology. Editor of American Journal of Reproductive Immunology and Fellow of the Royal College of Veterinary Surgeons.
- Gareth Jenkins (scientist) Director of Research of the Medical School and a "Research Leader" for Health and Care Research Wales.
- John Williams CBE Led establishment of Postgraduate Medical School, founding president of Welsh Association for Gastroenterology and Endoscopy.
- Ann John chair of public health and psychiatry, deputy head of medical school.
- Gareth Brenton Emeritus Professor of mass spectrometry.

== See also ==
- Medical education in Wales
- Medical school in the United Kingdom
- List of medical schools in the United Kingdom
