= Gareth Jenkins (scientist) =

Professor of molecular carcinogenesis

Gareth Jenkins is a professor of molecular carcinogenesis at Swansea University Medical School. Based in the Institute of Life Science, his interests include the study of DNA mutation induction (genetic toxicology) and the role of DNA mutations as diagnostic biomarkers for cancer. He is also director of research of the medical school and a “research leader” for Health and Care Research Wales. Jenkins' research gained much recognition during 2016 when his revolutionary cancer-detecting blood test was widely covered in the British press.

== Education and career ==
Jenkins undertook a joint honours BSc in physics and biology (biophysics) at King's College London in 1987. Subsequent to this, he studied for an MSc in biotechnology (with business) at the University of West of England in 1991. He worked at Cardiff University in the pure and applied biology department from 1992 to 1993 before moving to the genetics department at Swansea University to undertake a PhD under the supervision of Professor Jim Parry. He joined the newly founded medical school in Swansea in 2004 as senior lecturer, appointed reader in 2007, then professor in 2010. He is currently the associate dean for research, innovation and impact in the faculty of medicine, Health and Life Science.

During the 2016 British Science Festival hosted in Swansea, Jenkins made national headlines during a presentation on his cancer-detecting blood test.

== Professional roles ==
Alongside his chair at Swansea University, Jenkins is the chair of the UK Government's Committee on Mutagenicity since 2021, having been a member from 2009-2019. He is (2020-2023) President of the UK Environmental Mutagen Society (UKEMS) and is also (2022-2026) President of the International Association of Environmental Mutagenesis and Genomics Societies (IAEMGS). He was a member of the South West Wales Local Regional Ethics Committee (LREC) from 2005 to 2009. He was editor of the Elsevier journal Mutation Research (Genetic Toxicology and Environmental Mutagenesis) from 2013 to 2015 and is currently a senior editor of the journal Mutagenesis. He was a sub panel member for the Research Excellence Framework (REF), sitting on the UoA3 sub panel in 2021/2022. He has an Honorary position at Abertawe Bro Morgannwg University (ABMU) Health Board.

== Awards and honours ==
Young Scientist prize, United Kingdom Environmental Mutagen Society (UKEMS) 2002 and the European Environmental Mutagen Society (EEMS) 2003. Committee Member United Kingdom Environmental Mutagen Society (UKEMS) 2012-2015. Member; British Association of Cancer Research (BACR), United Kingdom Environmental Mutagen Society (UKEMS).

== Other activities ==
Published book, Bile Acids: Toxicology and Bioactivity (2008), Royal Society of Chemistry Press. Over 120 scientific articles published (see reference 1)
