= Keith Lloyd =

Welsh medical doctor

Professor of Psychiatry Swansea University

Director of NISH - National Institute for Sport and Health

Personal details
- Education: Guy's Hospital Medical School; London School of Economics
- Medical career
- Field: Psychiatry

Keith Lloyd is professor of psychiatry at Swansea University Medical School. where he is also director of NISH - the National Institute for Sport and Health. NISH is funded by Swansea Bay City Deal and is a leading innovation hub in Swansea dedicated to advancing sport, health, and wellbeing through technology. It is primarily a collaboration between Swansea University, the Swansea Bay City Deal, local health boards (NHS Wales), and industry partners, such as Vodafone designed to foster research and innovation in the sector.

Keith Lloyd is the chair of Health Technology Wales HTW appraises non-medicine health and social care technologies and models of care and support. Based on clinical and cost effectiveness appraisal HTW publishes guidance on whether the technology should be adopted for use in Wales.

Keith Lloyd is a council member of the General Medical Council. He is one of six doctors and six lay members on the council, and is the registrant member for Wales. The GMC works with doctors, physician associates, anaesthesia associates, those they care for and other stakeholders to support good, safe patient care across the UK

== Education and early career ==
Lloyd qualified in medicine from Guy's Hospital Medical School. He later studied at the London School of Economics, trained in psychiatry at the Bethlem Royal Hospital and Maudsley Hospitals and then undertook doctoral research at the Institute of Psychiatry London. He was subsequently appointed as consultant psychiatrist in Exeter UK and then became a professor of psychiatry and honorary consultant psychiatrist in Swansea.

== Professional roles ==
From 2012-20 Lloyd was Dean of Swansea University Medical School. From 2016-20 he was the elected chair in Wales and Vice President of the Royal College of Psychiatrists, Between 2020-2025 he was Pro Vice chancellor for Medicine Health & Life Science at Swansea University. From 2020-25 he was an independent member of Swansea Bay University Health Board. Keith Has been chair of the Welsh Psychiatric Society since 2005

== Awards and honours ==
- Fellow Learned Society of Wales
- Fellow Royal College of Physicians of Edinburgh
