= Mary Williams (professor) =

Welsh academic

Professor Mary Williams
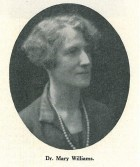
- Born: 1883; Aberystwyth, Cardiganshire, Wales
- Died: 1977 (aged 93–94); Aberystwyth, Cardiganshire, Wales
- Education: University College of Wales, Aberystwyth; University of Paris
- Organization(s): University of Manchester; King's College, London; Swansea University; Durham University
- Spouse: Dr George Arbour Stephens (married 1922-1945)
- Awards: Officier d’Academie and Chevalier de la Legion d’Honneur

Mary Williams (1883–1977) was a distinguished Welsh academic of modern languages. She was one of the first woman appointed to a professorial title at a British university.

Known by her peers as a pioneer in the field of comparative medieval literature, more especially the origin and rise of the Arthurian Romances, she was awarded the Officier d’Academie and Chevalier de la Legion d’Honneur by the French government in 1934.

== Early life and education ==
Mary Williams was the elder daughter of Revd. John Williams and Mrs Jane Williams of Aberystwyth, Cardiganshire. She was the sister of Jennie Williams (Mrs R. Ruggles Gates) and was brought up in a Welsh Presbyterian household. Her brother Jon died of cancer at the age of ten when she was only 3.

Williams attended Aberystwyth Elementary School and then in 1895, at the age of twelve, was enrolled at Camden School for Girls and then the North London Collegiate School for Girls (Frances Mary Buss Foundation), having obtained the Platt Endowment Scholarship to study. She obtained a first-class certificate in the London Matriculation Examination in 1901.

== Academic career and research ==
Williams attended University College of Wales, Aberystwyth, where she graduated with First Class Honours in French (1904) and German (1905). Following this, Williams spent two years (1905 to 1907) as a secondary school teacher in Portsmouth and Llandeilo. During this period, Williams studied towards and obtained an M.A.(Wales) by thesis on Wolfram von Eschenbach’s German epic poem "Parzival".

During 1907 - 1910 Mary Williams held a Research Fellowship in the University of Wales. This enabled her to undertake a period of study at the National University of Ireland at Dublin which contributed to the success of her research into the origin of the Arthurian Romances. At the same time, she enrolled at the Sorbonne where in 1910 she obtained a doctorate from the University of Paris, D.es l (D.Lit), producing a thesis dealing with the relation of the Welsh story of Peredur to the French and German versions. The work focused on the influence of Welsh literature and tradition on French Arthurian Romances. With an extensive knowledge of French, Welsh, Medieval Welsh, German language and Literature, this scholarship became her passion and shaped her lifelong career.

- 1912-13 University of Manchester, Assistant Lecturer in French.
- 1913-18 University of London, King’s College. Lecturer in French Language and Literature.
- 1919-20 University of London, King’s College. Reader in French language and literature, reader in Romance philology, (head of department 1920).

During the First World War, Mary Williams also held numerous responsibilities in addition to her full-time academic post at King's College. She taught French and German at London schools, delivered lectures for students reading for the new degree in commerce in the University of London, and read with students preparing for the Honours B.Sc. degree in economics and for the diploma in engineering. In 1915, the academic council of King's College recommended that she be appointed a reader of the university, but, owing to delay caused by the war, the readership was not conferred by the Senate until January 1919.

In 1921 Williams was appointed to the newly created post of professor of French language and literature in the Department of Modern Languages at University College Swansea, an early example of a woman achieving a professorial title. (An obituary of Williams noted that "it was said to be the first instance of a woman's appointment to an established Chair at a British university").

Williams's appointment came despite some opposition from established members of the college council, in the face of gender inequality. In fact, one of her prominent contemporary supporters Victor Spiers said, "She possesses in an astonishing degree in the power of grasping detail, without losing the due sense of proportion - as women are apt to do - in fact hers is a man’s mind in the best sense of the word". With Williams at the helm, modern language studies were able to thrive and grow into a separate German department in 1932. Williams continued to occupy the Chair of French until 1948.

In 1948 Williams was appointed professor of French and acting head of department at the University of Durham, a post she held until her retirement in 1952. She subsequently moved to London for a short period, before returning to Aberystwyth. Until 1975 Williams continued her association with University College Swansea as a member of the court of governors. The expanding university named a hall of residence in her honour in 1967.

Williams was a keen supporter of the National Library of Wales, depositing her research notes and papers in their archive. She died on 17 October 1977 in her ninety-fifth year.

== Notable achievements ==
Her personal achievements included the award of Officier d’Academie and Chevalier de la Legion d’Honneur. The investiture was held at the Hotel Metropole, Swansea in 1934 for promoting French language and literature to the Welsh nation. It was reported that Williams felt these were "not so much as being personal distinctions but rather as France’s tributes to Wales and to the Welsh contribution to our European cultural heritage".

Mary Williams had initiated a novel student exchange programme with French Universities whilst at UCL. The intended purpose here was to enable students to pursue their studies in France for one or two terms before final examinations. Furthermore, as part of her engagement with the political and civic society of Swansea, along with her husband Dr. George Arbour Stephens, Williams organised the performance of annual French plays for the benefit of the people of Swansea.

Her enthusiasm for her native country of Wales and its advancement and material prosperity contributed to the high esteem in which she was held by her colleagues and the wider community. Described by those who knew her as a great favourite, Williams "was a notable organiser who in a quiet and business-like way demonstrated sterling qualities and a zest for research". Her vitality, wit and sense of fun have been remarked upon by those who have written about her life, although she was known for being an exacting taskmaster to her students.

Between 1961 and 1963, Williams served as the President of the Folklore Society. Her Presidential addresses were on the figure of King Arthur and place-names in legend and belief.

She also served as:

- First President of University of London Welsh Society
- President of the London Society of Old Aberystwythians
- Vice President of the Swansea Liberal Association
- President and Founder of the South Wales Branch of the Modern Language Association

== Legacy ==
There is an active Mary Williams Group at Swansea University whose members share good practice, support the university’s equality agenda and act as role models to individuals at the institution. The network hold regular seminars around the theme of gender equality in academia, inviting notable speakers from the UK and beyond. The group also host an annual Mary Williams Award. This is given to an individual associated with Swansea University who has made an outstanding contribution to the culture and community of the institution.
