= Florence Annie Mockeridge =

British botanist

- Born: 15 September 1889
- Died: 18 December 1958 (aged 69)
- Education: Woolwich Polytechnic, King's College, London
- Awards: Carter Gold Medal
- Scientific career
- Workplaces: King's College, London, Swansea University
- Thesis: (1917)
- Doctoral advisor: Prof W. B. Bottomley

Florence Annie Mockeridge (15 September 1889 – 18 December 1958) was a British botanist and university professor.

Mockeridge was a lecturer at King's College, London, 1917-1922, and lecturer (and later professor) at University College Swansea (now Swansea University) 1922-1954. She was also a Linnean Society Fellow. Her research output included significant work on growth promoting substances.

== Research and early career ==
Mockeridge studied at Woolwich Polytechnic and King’s College, London where she graduated with first-class honours in both the Pass and Honours degrees (1909 and 1910 respectively). She was awarded the Carter Gold Medal of King’s College. In 1917 Mockeridge earned a doctor of science degree (D.Sc. London) for her research on nitrogen fixation by Azotobacter and on the auximones of natural manures. This research, conducted with Prof W. B. Bottomley, involved Mockeridge organising numerous trials using peat as a medium.

During 1917-22 Mockeridge remained on the staff of King’s College as university lecturer and demonstrator in Botany. In a reference, Prof W. B Bottomley described Mockeridge as 'an admirable lecturer and her classes at King’s College are always very popular and well attended' and 'Not only is she a good teacher, but she is also a splendid disciplinarian, and has never had the slightest trouble with any of her classes of mixed men and women of all ages'.

Research she undertook during this period demonstrated the presence in natural manures of nucleic acid degradation products, including the purine bases, and examined their growth-promoting activities.

== University College of Swansea ==
In 1922 Mockeridge took up a post as independent lecturer in Botany in charge of the Department of Biology at the newly established University College of Swansea (now Swansea University).

At Swansea, over a period of thirty-two years, she built up the reputation of the honours degree in Botany and supervised work carried out by a succession of research students. This was achieved in circumstances that were far from ideal – with a small staff, inadequate facilities and temporary accommodation.

In 1936 she was elected first professor of Botany in the College.

Shortly before she retired in 1954 her ambition to establish separate departments of Botany and Zoology with honours degrees in each was realised. She also planned facilities for the new Natural Sciences Building, aware that its use would be for her successors.

Her work at Swansea extended beyond the life sciences departments. She was Dean of the Faculty of Science during 1933-35 and again during 1941-43. During the years 1949-51 she was Vice-Principal of the University College. She was also, for many years, Treasurer of the Students’ Representative Council.

In 1935, she argued the case for a pay increase for L. Thomas, Laboratory Attendant: 'He is every bit as indispensable to my Department as are the chief laboratory attendants in other science departments of the College, while his wages compare unfavourably with those of most other attendants and also with those of some other College servants, who could be replaced more readily than he could.'

Beyond the university, Mockeridge was a sought after lecturer throughout South Wales. She was also, for many years, editor of the Proceedings of the Swansea Field Naturalists' Society. After retiring, she became Chair of the Science Committee of the National Museum of Wales and a member of the Glantawe Hospital Management Committee.

She died on 18 December 1958 at the age of sixty-nine.

To this day, students at Swansea University compete for the Florence A Mockeridge Prize in Botany.
