= Gyanendra Nath Pande =

British civil engineer (1939–2020)

Gyan N Pande
- Education: B.Tech - Indian Institute of Technology, Kharagpur, Ph.D & D.Sc - University of Wales
- Occupations: Professor Emeritus at the Centre for Civil & Computational Engineering, Swansea University and President, International Centre for Computational Engineering (IC2E)
- Notable work: Swansea University
- Parent(s): Shri Madan Mohan Pande and Smt. Kamla Devi Pande

Gyanendra Nath Pande or Gyan N Pande (1939 – 20 January 2020) was a British civil engineer of Indian descent associated with developments in computational engineering. He was Emeritus Professor at the Centre for Civil and Computational Engineering at Swansea University and founder president of the International Centre for Computational Engineering (IC2E).

== Education and career ==
Pande grew up in India and obtained a Bachelor of Technology in civil engineering from the Indian Institute of Technology, Kharagpur in 1959. He worked in the field of geomechanics, gaining more than ten years experience as a project engineer in tunnelling and hydroelectric installations in the Himalayas. From 1973 he studied at University of Wales (now Swansea University) from where he received a PhD in 1976.

He joined the Department of Civil Engineering of the University of Wales in 1975 as lecturer, and was awarded a 'Personal Chair' in 1994 (the same year he was awarded a DSc degree).

In 1985 he was the founding editor of the computational geomechanics journal, Computers & Geotechnics. He was the founder president of the International Centre for Computational Engineering (IC2E), an organisation instrumental in setting up research and collaborations between universities and industry.

He was Emeritus Professor at Swansea University and a Fellow of Institution of Civil Engineers.

He died on 20 January 2020.

=== Professional appointments ===
- Co-chair, International Symposium on Computational Geomechanics
- Chief Editor, Computers & Geotechnics
- Member, Advisory Panel of Geotechnique
- Chairman, Ground Engineering Group of the Institution of Civil Engineers, Wales Branch
- Chairman, International Committee on 'Computer Modelling of Masonry'
- Member of an expert committee appointed by Hydro-Quebec, Canada

=== Awards and honours ===
- Special Achievements in Geomechanics Award, International Association for Computer Methods and Advances in Geomechanics (IACMAG), 2014
- Manby Prize, Institution of Civil Engineers, London, 2005
- Significant paper award of IACMAG, 2001 and 2002
- Best paper award – Journal of Rock Mechanics & Tunnelling Technology, 2003

== Works ==
Pande wrote over 250 books and research papers.

== Personal and family life ==
Pande was a founding member and trustee of the Tridev Meditation and Spiritual Awareness Society at Swansea.

Pande's younger brother Jitendra Nath Pande was professor and head of medicine, AIIMS, New Delhi, India. He was senior consultant (medicine) at the Sitaram Bhartia Institute of Science and Research, New Delhi.
