= Yamni Nigam =

British medical entomologist

- Education: King's College London; Liverpool School of Tropical Medicine; Swansea University (1988-1992)
- Known for: Maggot Therapy; Immunology; Parasitology
- Awards: WISE award 2018
- Scientific career
- Workplaces: Swansea University
- Thesis: Studies on immune reactions in vectors of trypanosomes (1992)

Yamni Nigam FRES is a British entomologist. She is a professor at Swansea University. Her scientific research focuses on the immune system of insects and invertebrates. She has a particular interest in wound healing and maggot (larval) therapy. Nigam additionally lectures on anatomy, physiology and pathophysiology within the School of Health & Social Care in the Faculty of Medicine, Health & Life - science at Swansea University.

== Education and early career ==
Nigam gained her bachelor's degree from King's College London and then earned a master's degree in applied parasitology and medical entomology at the Liverpool School of Tropical Medicine. She continued her education by commencing a doctorate at University College Swansea (now Swansea University) in 1988. Her doctoral research investigated the prophenoloxidase system (pPO) in reduviid bugs and tsetse flies using in vitro experiments.

After earning her PhD, Nigam took a post-doctoral position at the Oswaldo Cruz Foundation in Rio de Janeiro, Brazil, where she conducted research on the immune defence to the parasite Trypanosoma cruzi, the causative agent of Chagas disease.

== Career ==
In 2001, Nigam founded the Swansea University Maggot Research Group, of which she is a director. The group focuses on therapeutic applications of the medicinal maggot Lucilia sericata. She then became an associate professor at Swansea University.

In 2018, Nigam was promoted to professor which included a move from the research to the innovation and engagement strand.

Nigam fulfills many roles outside of her permanent academic position. In 2007, she became a member of the Welsh Wound Network group, an enterprise which aims to support the clinical development of wound healing science. In April 2014, she was an elected participant of the Welsh Crucible Programme. Nigam is an elected Fellow of the Royal Entomological Society (FRES).

=== In the news ===
In 2003, a BBC News report highlighted the risky levels of bacteria found in Welsh ambulances, the result of Nigam and her team's research beginning in 2000.

Nigam leads the Love a Maggot! campaign at Swansea University which champions the adoption of living maggots as a clinical treatment for healing chronic wounds. Chronic (non-healing) wounds can be a risk for people who have diabetes or vascular problems. She led a survey which found that 28 percent of participants, mainly British, were not receptive to the use of maggots for medicinal purposes. However, the effectiveness of these bugs was shown through her research.

In 2017, as associate professor, her research continued to make the headlines promoting the use of maggots in the National Health Service and proving their effectiveness.

=== Outreach ===
Nigam is a trained STEM Ambassador and delivers lessons on microbiology and entomology to pupils at local schools. She participated in the 2014 Soapbox Science public engagement event in Swansea. Nigam works to change the Welsh school curriculum in order to promote gender equality in STEM.

== Awards and honors ==
- WISE Innovation Award (2018)
