= Ronan Lyons =

Ronan Lyons is the inaugural Clinical Professor of Public Health at Swansea University Medical School. He is Director of the National Centre for Population Health and Wellbeing Research (NCPHWR), Director of the Farr Institute Centre for the Improvement of Population Health through E-records Research (CIPHER), Co-director of the Secure Anonymised Information Linkage (SAIL) system, co-director of the Centre for the Development and Evaluation of Complex Interventions for Public Health Improvement (DECIPHer), and co-director of the Administrative Data Research Centre Wales.

== Education and early career ==
Lyons trained at Mercer's Hospital, Dublin and qualified in medicine from the School of Medicine in 1983. He later completed an MPH degree at University College Dublin in 1988 and an MD from Trinity College Dublin in 1993. After several years in hospital and community medicine, Lyons undertook specialist training in public health in Ireland before being appointed a consultant with the West Glamorgan Health Authority (now Abertawe Bro Morgannwg University Health Board) in 1992.

== Professional roles ==
Along with his position as Clinical Professor of Public Health at Swansea University Medical School, Lyons is an Honorary Consultant with Public Health Wales NHS Trust and adjunct professor at the School of Public Health and Preventive Medicine at Monash University, Australia.

== Awards and honours ==
Lyons was elected a Fellow of the Learned Society of Wales in 2013.

Fellow Faculty of Public Health Medicine, Royal College of Physicians in Ireland

Lyons was appointed an Honorary Officer of the Order of the British Empire in 2021, with the appointment being made substantive (OBE) in January 2022.

He was elected a Fellow of the Academy of Medical Sciences in 2022.

== Other activities ==
Lyons is also Chair of the International Collaborative Effort on Injury Statistics (Injury ICE) at the US National Center for Health Statistics.
