= Martin Sheldon =

Martin Sheldon is a veterinarian and scientific researcher. He is Professor Emeritus at Swansea University Medical School.

== Career ==
Born in Yorkshire, Sheldon studied at Bradford Grammar School and then at the University of Liverpool School of Veterinary Science. He graduated with a Bachelor of Veterinary Science and membership of the Royal College of Veterinary Surgeons in 1984. He spent 14 years in clinical veterinary practice in Carmarthen, West Wales, where he became a partner in 1986. Sheldon was awarded the Diploma in Bovine Reproduction from the University of Liverpool in 1992; became a Royal College of Veterinary Surgeons Specialist in 1993; and, was awarded the Diploma in Cattle Health and Production from the Royal College of Veterinary Surgeons in 1997.

Sheldon joined the Royal Veterinary College in 1998 to teach veterinary reproduction, and he was awarded the James Bee Educator Prize twice. He completed a PhD with Professor Hilary Dobson in 2002 through the University of Liverpool. Research project funding from the Wellcome Trust and Biotechnology and Biological Sciences Research Council (BBSRC) formed the foundation for his research. Whilst in London, Sheldon spent some time on an OECD fellowship at the Cornell University College of Veterinary Medicine, USA; as a visiting lecturer at the University of Bologna, Italy; and, on the Frontiers in Reproduction Course at the Marine Biological Laboratory, Woods Hole, USA. In 2006, Sheldon was awarded a 3-year BBSRC Research Development Fellowship and in 2008 he moved from London to a new Personal Chair at the Institute of Life Science in Swansea University Medical School. In 2013, Sheldon was a Distinguished Lecturer at the University of Florida. Sheldon has published more than 100 papers in academic journals; and is on the editorial board of the American Journal of Reproductive Immunology.

Sheldon works on infection and immunity. His initial work was on bacterial infection of the female reproductive system, particularly postpartum metritis. Using dairy cattle, he identified the bacteria that cause uterine disease, including novel strains of Escherichia coli that are adapted to the uterine environment. In addition, Sheldon showed that the bacterium Trueperella pyogenes becomes a pathogen in the uterus by secreting a cholesterol-dependent cytolysin that damages stromal cells, once the epithelium is damaged after parturition. Oxysterols, such as 25-hydroxycholesterol, are found in the reproductive tract and protect tissue cells against cholesterol-dependent cytolysins. Sheldon uncovered the role for the innate immune system in the endometrium of the uterus, showing that epithelial and stromal cells, as well as the expected immune cells, have roles in host-pathogen interactions. Sheldon was the first to show that infections in the uterus disrupt the structure and function of the mammalian ovary. Sheldon also identified that ovarian cells sense and respond to pathogen-associated molecular patterns, leading to inflammation, and even damaging the oocyte. Work on cholesterol-dependent cytolysins has led to discoveries about how host tissue cells can be protected against toxins.

== Distinctions ==
Fellowship Royal College of Veterinary Surgeons (2013) for meritorious contributions to understanding the mechanisms of infection and immunity in the female genital tract

Schofield Medal: a prize given in honor of Frank Schofield, by Ontario Veterinary College, Canada (2015)
