= Amy Brown (dietitian) =

Welsh dietitian

- Education: University of Wales
- Scientific career
- Fields: Child nutrition
- Workplaces: Swansea University
- Thesis: Maternal control of early milk feeding: The role of attitudes, intention and experience (2010)
- Doctoral advisor: Michelle Lee
- Website: https://www.swansea.ac.uk/staff/human-and-health-sciences/allstaff/a.e.brown/

Amy Brown is a Welsh psychologist. She is a Professor of Child Public Health at Swansea University who specialises in maternal and child health, particularly nutrition. She campaigns to bring about better support for women who want to breastfeed and to improve the UK public's attitude towards breastfeeding in public.

== Career ==
Brown began her academic career with a first in Psychology at Swansea University before undertaking an MSc in social research methods at the same institution gaining a distinction. Brown began her doctorate at Swansea in 2005 whilst also pregnant. She considers that pregnancy changed the emphasis of her work from infant to baby diets. She completed her part-time PhD in Psychology in 2010.

Following her PhD Brown was appointed lecturer in 2011 at Swansea University and became Professor of Child Public Health in March 2018, leading Swansea University's MSC in Child Public Health.

== Research ==
Brown's research concerns the UK having the lowest breastfeeding rates in the world. She researches social barriers to breastfeeding and works with those in public health to create an environment conducive to breastfeeding. Brown has collected data from over 30,000 mothers on infant behaviour and the impact of formula and baby care on it and maternal health. Her work indicates that the NHS could save £40 million a year if breastfeeding rates were increased. Brown has engaged with the public about breastfeeding and for a change in public attitudes towards breastfeeding in public. She noted in 2016 that 'more people in the UK believe smacking is acceptable than believe that breastfeeding in public is okay.' Only 0.5% of British babies are breastfed for more than a year, whereas the figures in Germany and the United States were more than 20% in 2016.

Brown's research has been picked up in Ireland, which shares with the UK a poor rate of breastfeeding. Ireland compounds this by exporting large volumes of baby formula milk; it is the second-largest exporter to China.

Brown is a trustee of "First Steps Nutrition", an independent public health nutrition charity that supports eating well from pre-conception to five years and counts Jamie Oliver, Patti Rundall OBE and Professor Annie Anderson as its patrons.

== Publications ==
Brown has published over 63 peer-reviewed articles and has several books on the topic of infant feeding and parenting published by Pinter and Martin:

- Breastfeeding Uncovered: Who really decides how we feed our babies? (2016)
- Why Starting Solids Matters (2017)
- The Positive Breastfeeding Book: Everything you need to feed your baby with confidence (2018)
- Informed is best: how to spot fake news about your pregnancy, birth and baby (2019)
- Why breastfeeding grief and trauma matter (2019)
- Let’s talk about the first year of parenting (2020)
