= Swansea University =

Public university in Swansea, Wales

- Welsh: Prifysgol Abertawe
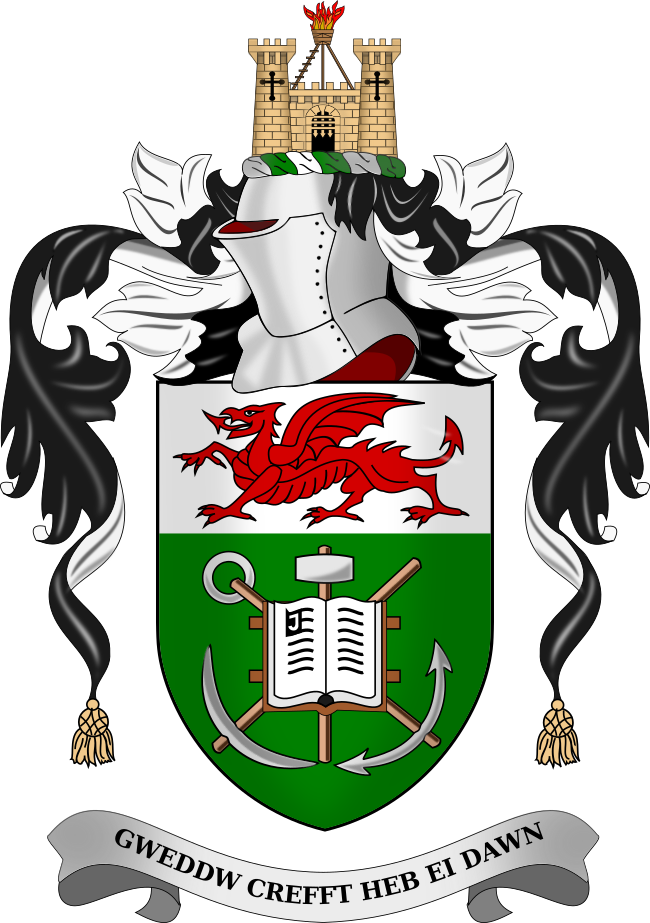
- Former names: University College of Swansea, University of Wales Swansea
- Motto: Welsh: Gweddw crefft heb ei dawn
- Motto in English: "Technical skill is bereft without culture"
- Type: Public
- Established: 1920 - University College of Swansea, 1996 - University of Wales, Swansea
- Academic affiliations: ACU; EUA; Universities UK; Defence Universities Alliance
- Endowment: £8.14 million (2025)
- Budget: £333.2 million (2024/25)
- Chancellor: Dame Jean Thomas
- Vice-Chancellor: Paul Boyle
- Administrative staff: 3290
- Students: 18,985 (2024/25)
- Undergraduates: 15,000 (2024/25)
- Postgraduates: 3,985 (2024/25)
- Location: Swansea, Wales; 51°36′35″N 3°58′50″W
- Campus: Suburban/coastal
Colours
Academic: Blue and white
Athletic union: Green and white
- Website: swansea.ac.uk

Swansea University (Welsh: Prifysgol Abertawe) is a public research university located in Swansea, Wales. It was established as University College of Swansea in 1920, as the fourth college of the University of Wales. In 1996, it changed its name to the University of Wales Swansea following structural changes within the University of Wales. The title of Swansea University was formally adopted on 1 September 2007 when the University of Wales became a non-membership confederal institution and the former members became universities in their own right.

Swansea University has three faculties across its two campuses which are located on the coastline of Swansea Bay. The Singleton Park Campus is set in the grounds of Singleton Park to the west of Swansea city centre. The £450 million Bay Campus, which opened in September 2015, is located next to Jersey Marine Beach to the east of Swansea in the Neath Port Talbot area. The annual income of the institution for 2024–25 was £333.2 million of which £51.2 million was from research grants and contracts, with an expenditure of £372.2 million.

It is the third largest university in Wales in terms of number of students. It offers about 450 undergraduate courses, 280 postgraduate taught and 150 postgraduate research courses to 20,375 undergraduate and postgraduate students.

== History ==
=== Foundations ===
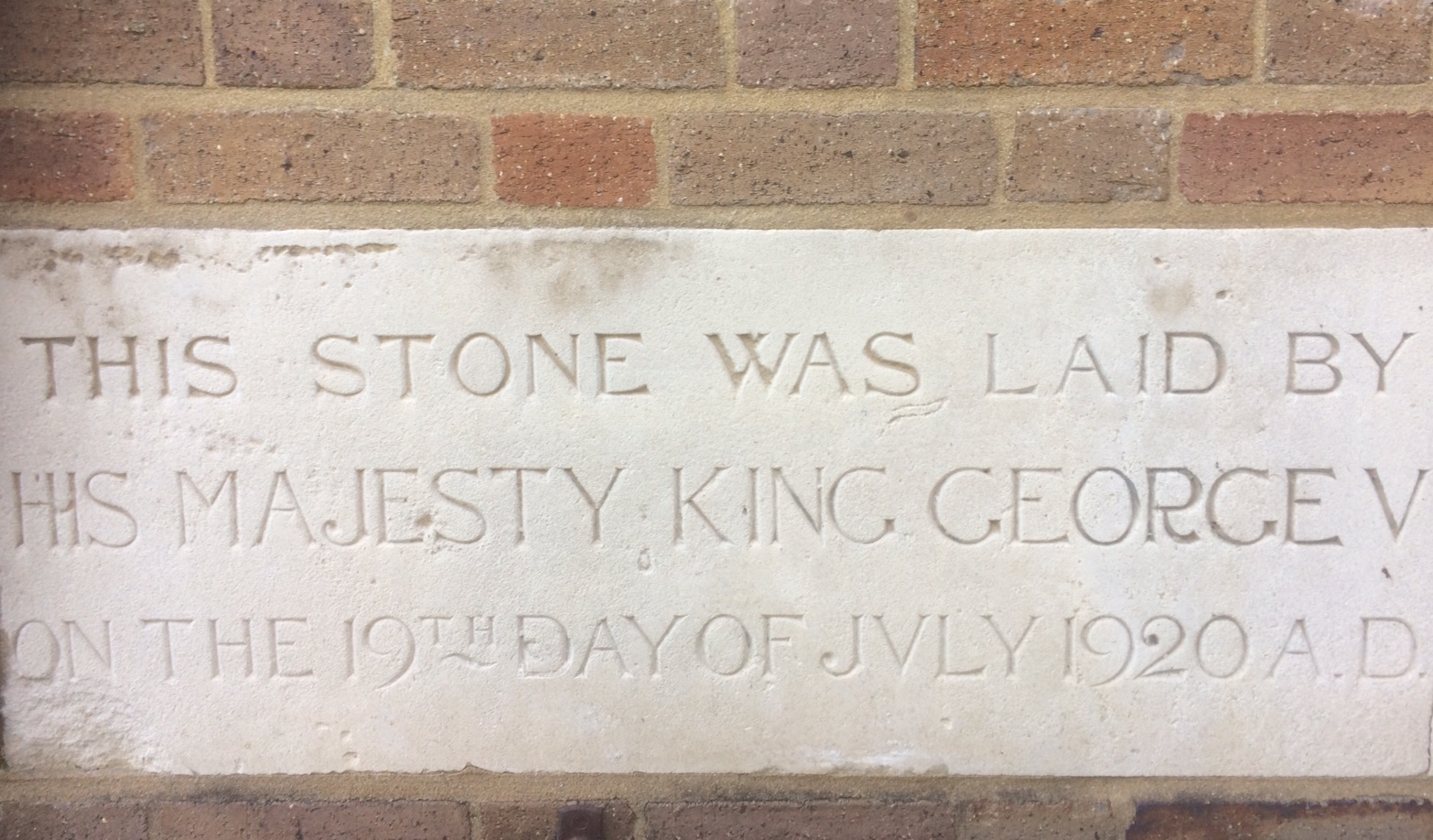
Swansea University foundation stone

The University College, Swansea, (as it was known then), was established in 1920, opening its doors on 5 October. At the time, it was the youngest of the four colleges of the University of Wales. It was established on the recommendations of a Royal Commission set up in 1916. The college was founded on what were perceived as the needs and the wants of the local area, and Swansea's main industries in particular.

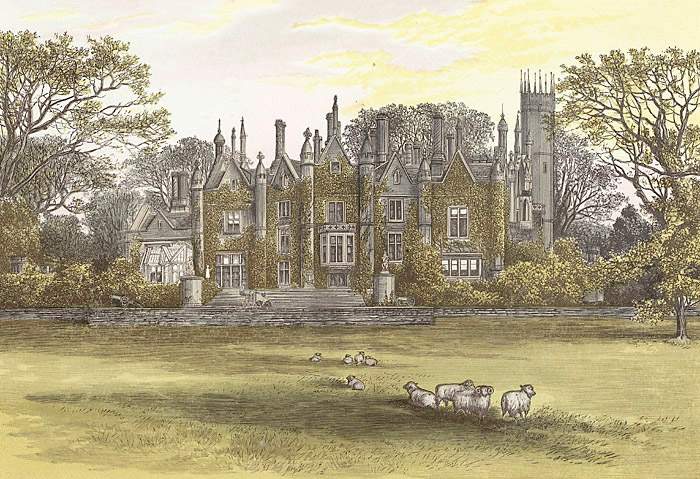
Singleton Abbey

The Park Campus houses the oldest parts of the university's estate, including Singleton Abbey, a large eighteenth-century mansion which was the ancestral home of the Vivian family, having been bought by the prominent industrialist, John Henry Vivian.

Swansea University's foundation stone was laid by King George V in July 1920, welcoming 89 students, of whom eight were female. Subjects taught from the beginning of the college were the sciences, mathematics, metallurgy and engineering. The professors were A.R. Richardson (Mathematics), E.J. Evans (Physics), J.E. Coates (Chemistry), A.E. Trueman (Geology), C.A. Edwards (Metallurgy) and F. Bacon (Engineering).

The university was granted a coat of arms by the College of Heralds in 1921 with the motto Gweddw Crefft Heb Ei Dawn, translated as 'technical skill is bereft without culture.'

Arts subjects were not taught immediately in 1920, but started in the following 'session', 1921–22. The first professors in those initial departments were David Emrys Evans (Classics), W.D. Thomas (English language and literature), Henry Lewis (Welsh), E. Ernest Hughes (History), F.A. Cavenagh (education) and Mary Williams (French). Williams was the first woman to be appointed to a chair in the United Kingdom. This met with some reaction from senior men at the college, one of whom she would later marry.

Saunders Lewis, the well-known Welsh language writer and activist, became a member of staff in 1922 although he ran up against controversy in 1936/37 for trying to set fire to a Royal Air Force bombing school on the Llŷn Peninsula. He was tried at the Old Bailey and sent to prison for nine months.

When Singleton Abbey and its surrounding land was handed to the college in 1923, arts subjects were moved there from the college's temporary site in Mount Pleasant. Student numbers remained relatively small until the Second World War.

Swansea acquired departments of philosophy in 1925, German in 1931, economics in 1937, social policy in 1947, political theory and government in 1954 – the same year that a civil engineering and a geography department were added. In 1961 Swansea became a centre for Russian and East European studies, while Italian and Spanish joined the Department of French.

There were many notable staff members at the university in the period, including the long-serving female professor of botany, Florence Mock ridge. Another was Glanmor Williams (history) who retired in 1982. Other well-known staff members were the author of novels such as Lucky Jim and That Uncertain Feeling, Kingsley Amis, who lectured in English in the 1950s and early 1960s; Rush Rhees, who was a member of staff from 1940 to 1966, an expert on philosophy of Ludwig Wittgenstein; and Kenneth O. Morgan (now Lord Morgan of Aberdyfi) who was a junior history lecturer from 1958 to 1966.

=== Post-war campus development ===
In 1947, John Fulton, the university principal, had designs on creating the UK's first self-contained university campus. Located in the vast expanse of Singleton Park, the university only had 2 permanent buildings; Singleton Abbey and the library.

The 1960s saw the university embark on a large campus development programme, aiming to fulfill Fulton's plan of becoming a self-contained community within the city. Along with new halls of residence, a Maths and Science Tower was built, with College House – later renamed Fulton House.

== Campus ==
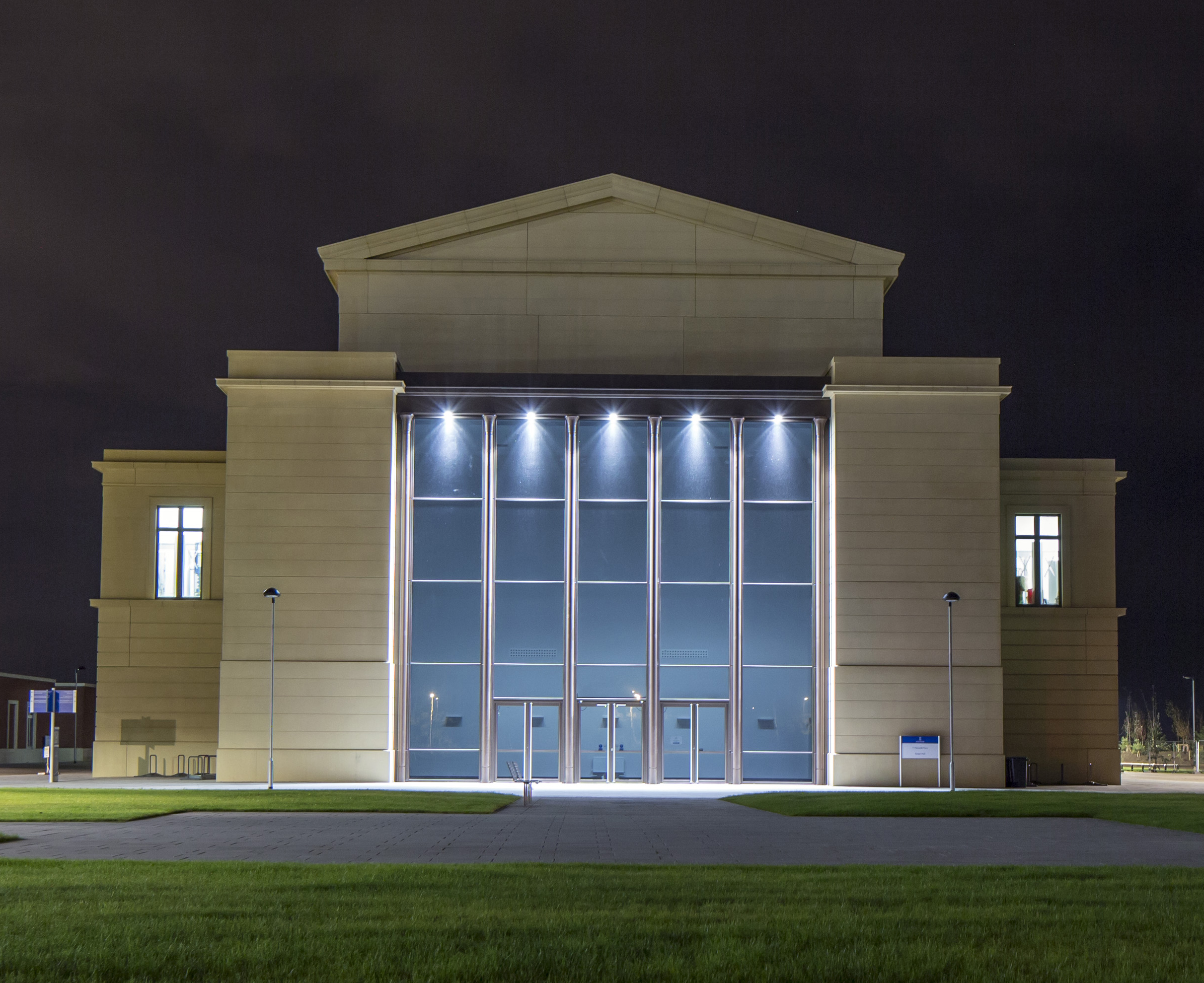
Great Hall at Swansea University Bay Campus

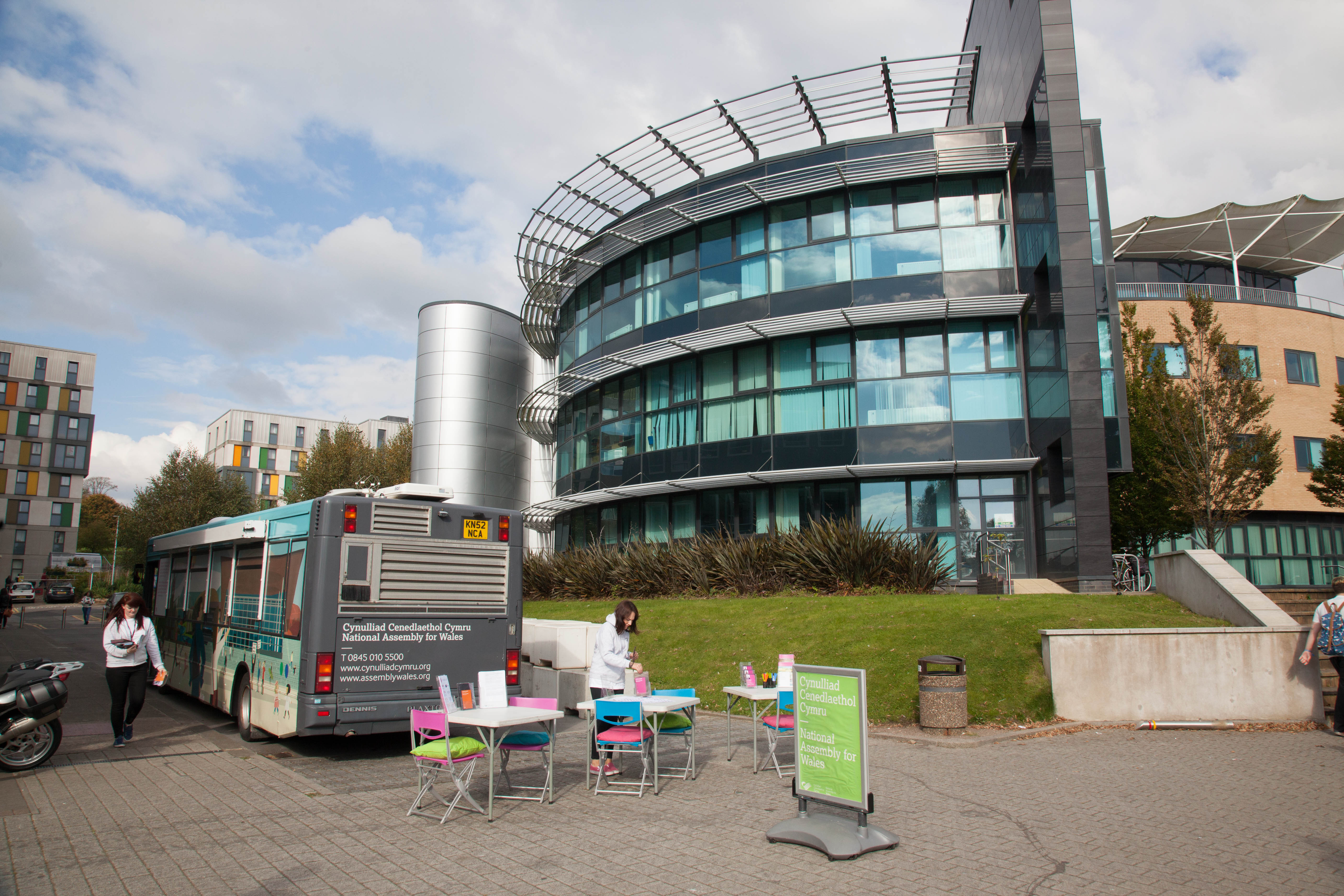
Singleton Park Campus; 2015

For most of its history, Swansea University operated exclusively from the Singleton Park Campus. However, owing to rapid expansion, the university developed a 65-acre, £450 million beachfront science and innovation Bay Campus which opened in September 2015. Since then, Swansea University has operated as a dual-campus university with the 'Park Campus' located in its traditional Singleton Park grounds, and the Bay Campus, at Crymlyn Burrows.

The Bay campus has been developed on a 65-acre beachfront site between Fabian Way and Jersey Marine beach at Crymlyn Burrows. It houses much of the Faculty of Science and Engineering and the School of Management, a Great Hall seating 800, a library offering views over a Site of Special Scientific Interest, and student accommodation, as well as several research institutes.

=== Sports ===
Swansea Bay Sports Park facilities include, five minutes' walk from the Singleton Park Campus, the 50-metre Wales National Pool Swansea, eight-lane outdoor athletics track, six-lane indoor track and training centre, floodlit playing fields including rugby, football, lacrosse and cricket pitches, artificial hockey pitches, a sports hall, tennis and squash courts, a climbing wall and spin room. Facilities at the Bay Campus include a sports hall, multi-use games area, and gym. The university also owns training pitches in the north of the city, in Fairwood, which it has developed alongside Swansea City A.F.C.

During the 2012 Summer Olympics, the university hosted the training camps for the Mexican and New Zealand paralympic teams and the Ireland triathlon team. In 2014, it hosted the IPC Athletics European Championships. Furthermore, in 2015 it hosted the training camps of the Canada national rugby union team and the Fiji national rugby union team in preparation for the 2015 Rugby World Cup.

Sports science at the university ranks 13th in the Complete University Guide Sports Science Rankings 2023. The department has links with Swansea City A.F.C., Ospreys and Welsh Athletics. Former scholars include Wales rugby union player Alun Wyn Jones, Olympic swimmer Georgia Davies, Paralympian swimmer Liz Johnson and Paralympian boccia player David Smith. Swansea is in the top quarter of the British University's sporting leagues. It competes with Cardiff University in the Welsh Varsity tournament, the largest student sports event in Wales. This includes The Welsh Boat Race and the showcase rugby union varsity match which attracted 16,000 students to Swansea's Liberty Stadium in 2015.

==== Wales National Pool ====
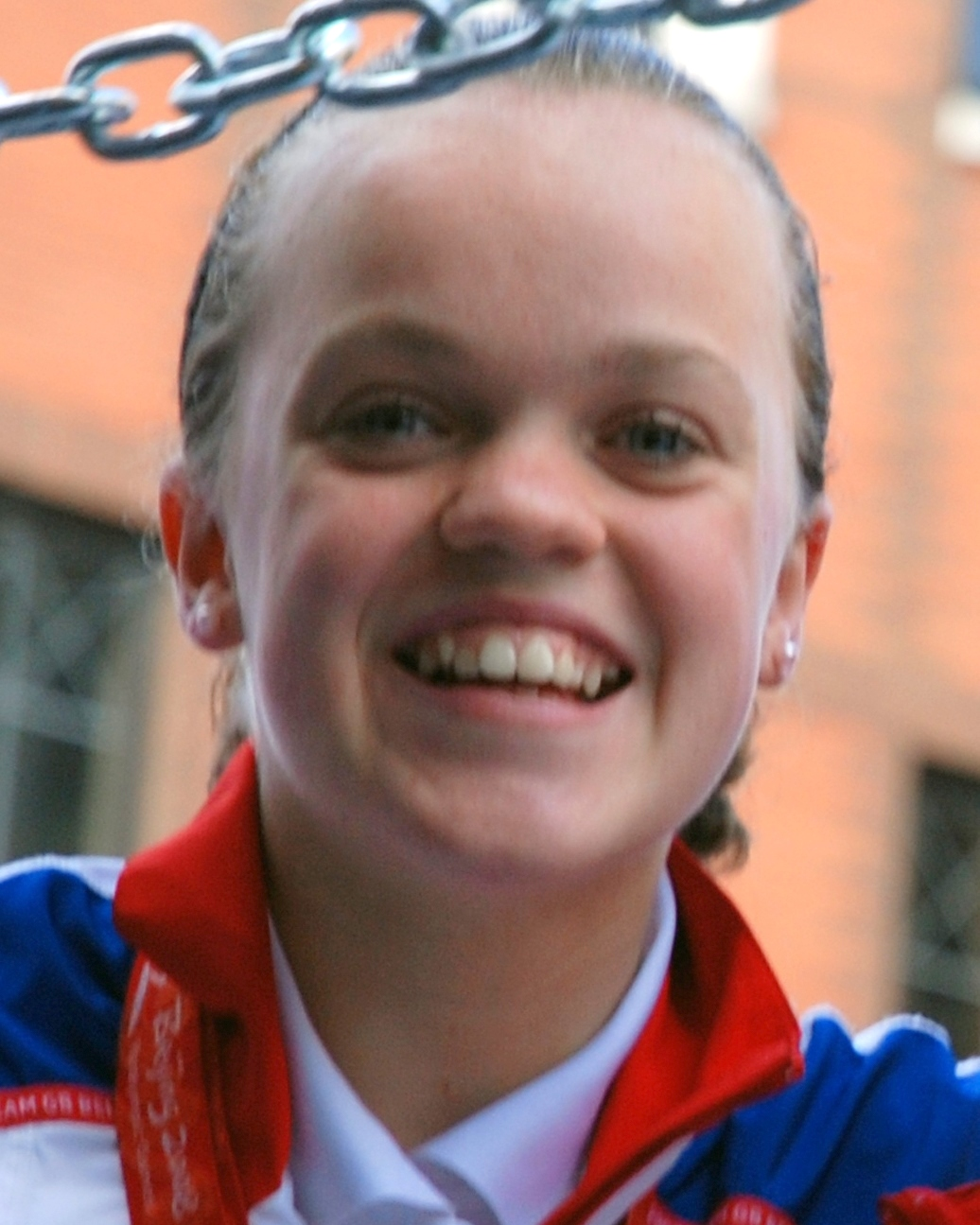
Ellie Simmonds, 2008 Olympic Parade

The Wales National Pool, next to the Singleton Park Campus, is a 50-metre pool built to FINA standards. The facility, which also has a 25m × 9.5m training pool and 1,200 spectator seats, is HQ of Swim Wales.

The pool, one of five of British Swimming's Intensive Training Centres (ITC), was used to train swimmers for the London 2012 Olympics was built with funding from Sport Wales, Swansea Council and Swansea University.

It is home to the Swim Wales National Performance Centre, a hub for elite and performance swimming in Wales. This has included disability swimming under renowned coach Billy Pye who has trained several Paralympians in Swansea, including Ellie Simmonds and Liz Johnson. University sports science researchers provide back-up to the hub. The centre is also home to Swansea University Swimming and City of Swansea Aquatics.

=== Museum of Egyptian Antiquities (The Egypt Centre) ===
Located in the Taliesin building, the Egypt Centre is open to the public. More than 7,000 items are in its collection. Most were collected by the pharmacist and entrepreneur Sir Henry Wellcome. Others came from the British Museum, the Royal Edinburgh Museum, National Museums and Galleries of Wales Cardiff, the Royal Albert Museum and Art Gallery, and private donors.

Staff lecture museum groups and other outside bodies on volunteering, social inclusion and how to widen community participation with university museums. School parties regularly visit for interactive events.

== Organisation and administration ==
=== Governance ===
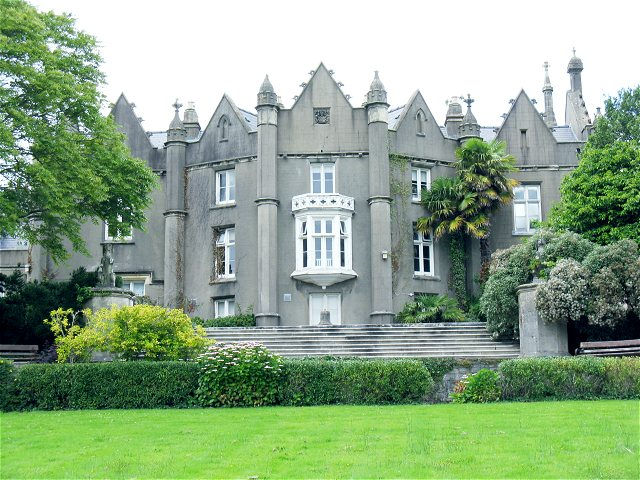
Singleton Abbey, the administrative building of the University

Swansea received its royal charter in 1920 and like many universities is governed by its constitution that is set out in its statutes and a charter. The governing body of Swansea University is its council, which is supported by the Senate and the court.

- The Council consists of 29 members including the chancellor, pro-chancellors, vice-chancellor, treasurer, pro-vice-chancellors, staff and student members, city council representation and a majority of lay members. The council is responsible for all of the university's activities and has a well-developed committee structure to help discharge its powers and duties.
- The Senate is the main academic body of the university and is responsible for teaching and research. Most of its 200 members are academics but it also includes representatives of the Students' Union and the Athletic Union. The Senate is chaired by the vice-chancellor, who is the head of the university both academically and administratively.
- The Court consists of more than 300 members representing stakeholders from local to national institutions. It meets annually to discuss the university's annual report, its financial statements and issues in higher education.

List of vice-chancellors

Principal

- 1920 to 1926: Franklin Sibly; first principal
- 1927 to 1947: C. A. Edwards
- 1947 to 1959: John Fulton
- 1960 to 1965: J. H. Parry
- 1965 to 1974: Frank Llewellyn-Jones
- 1974 to 1982: Robert Walter Steel
- 1982 to 1994 Brian Clarkson

Vice-Chancellor

- 1994 to 2003: Robin Williams
- 2003 to 2019: Richard B. Davies
- 2019 onward: Paul Boyle

== Faculties and Schools ==
Swansea University's academic departments are organised into three faculties, which include a total of eleven schools:

=== Humanities and Social Sciences ===
==== School of Culture and Communication ====
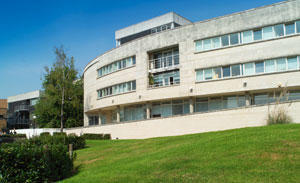
James Callaghan building, home to the History and Politics departments

The school offers courses in American studies; classics, ancient history, and Egyptology; English language, teaching English as a second or foreign language, and applied linguistics; English literature and creative writing; film and visual culture; history; media, communications, journalism, and public relations; modern languages, translation, and interpreting; and Welsh.

In spring 2006, M Wynn Thomas and Dai Smith established the Library of Wales series as an offshoot of the school which has influenced Welsh Government policy to benefit the creative industries, cultural tourism and education.

==== School of Management ====
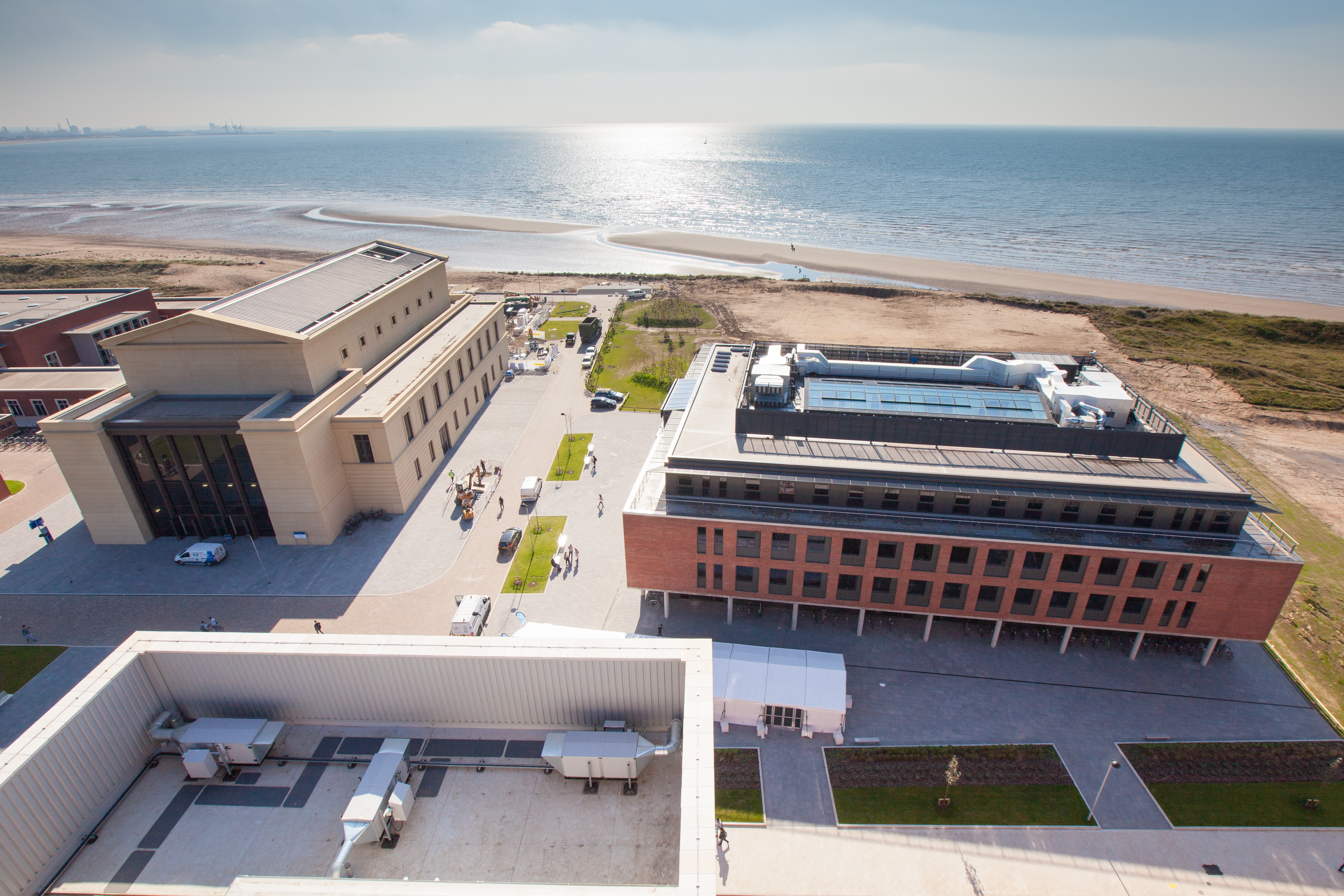
School of Management – Swansea University

The School of Management is a leading UK provider of management, finance and accounting education, with 100% of its research rated internationally excellent or world-leading in the 2021 Research Excellence Framework.

In 2015, the school relocated to the university's Bay Campus and is home to over 2,000 students, 150 members of staff and a range of industry partners, including The Bevan Commission, Fujitsu, Greenaway Scott, and AgorIP.

The School of Management provides a range of undergraduate and postgraduate courses, including accounting and finance, business management, economics, tourism, and marketing. The school ranks in the UK top 30 for business and economics graduate prospects, and top 10 for accounting and finance.

Alongside teaching, the school also houses various research centres including The Centre for Visitor Economy Research (CVER), Emerging Markets Research Centre (EMaRC), The Hawkes Centre for Empirical Finance, Swansea iLab, Welsh Economy Labour Markets Evaluation Research Centre (WELMERC), The Bevan Commission, The Centre for Health and Environmental Management Research and Innovation (CHEMRI), Centre for People and Organisation.

==== Hillary Rodham Clinton School of Law ====
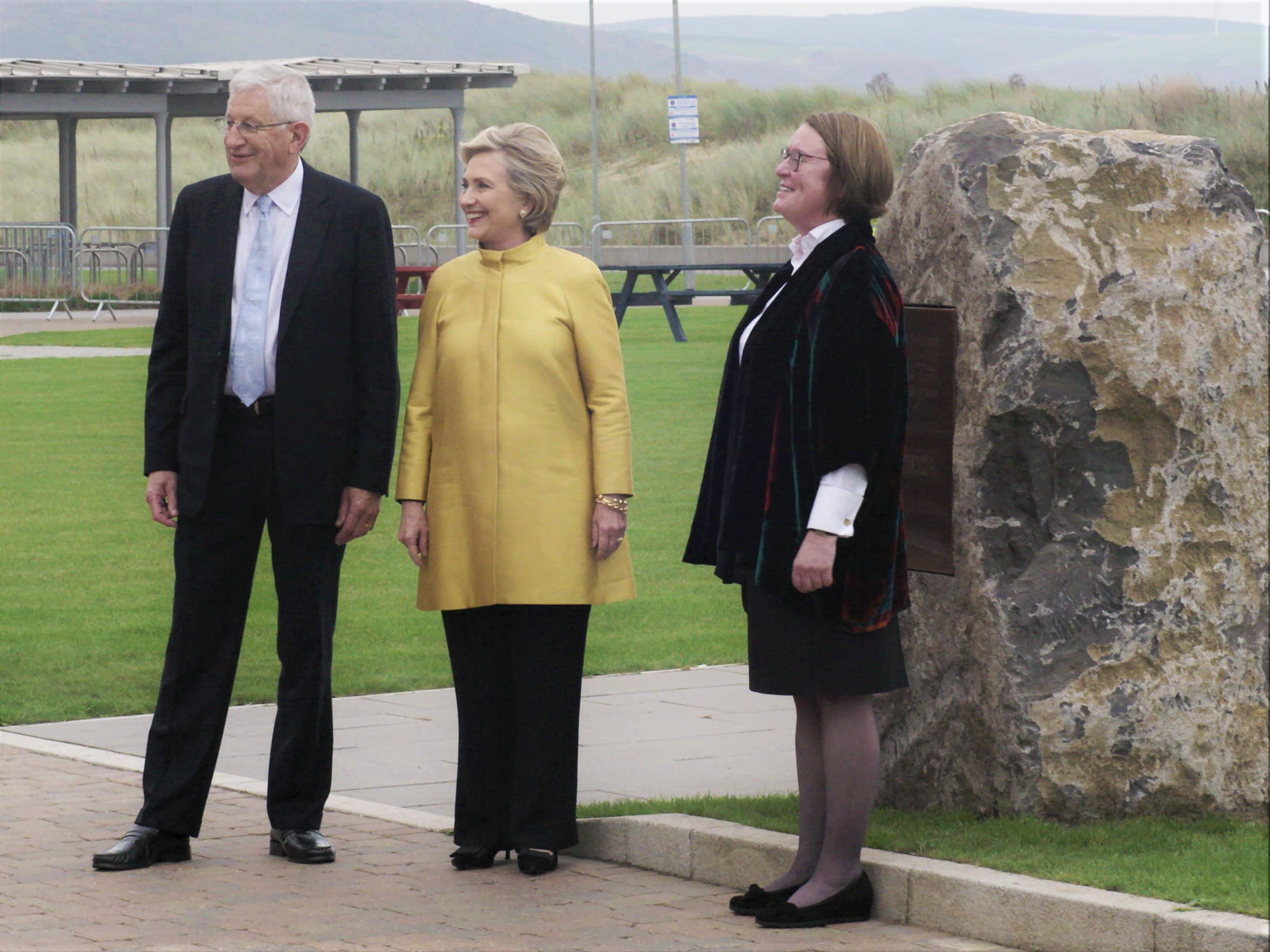
Former vice-chancellor Professor Richard B Davies, Hillary Clinton and former head of the school of law Professor Elwen Evans at Swansea University, 2017

The Hillary Rodham Clinton School of Law is the largest law school in Wales and ranks third in the UK for criminology and 22nd in the UK for law (The Times Good University Guide 2019). Swansea University opened its School of Law in 1994, in order to complement its departments in engineering, the sciences, and arts and humanities. Known previously as the College of Law and Criminology, the school's name changed on 14 October 2017, as part of a ceremony including the conferment of an honorary doctorate on Hillary Clinton.

The school is situated at the Singleton Campus. Plans to move to purpose-built premises on the university's Bay Campus were shelved in the wake of an internal and police investigation into alleged wrongdoing involving the senior staff. This new development was to house commercial law firms, technology companies, national and international agencies, along with the academics and students of the school.

Teaching at the School of Law comprises undergraduate, postgraduate and professional courses. Undergraduate programmes include qualifying law degrees and joint honours programmes. Criminology courses moved to be part of the School of Social Sciences when the move to a faculty structure took place. Postgraduate law programmes include LLMs in shipping and trade, human rights, legaltech and MA in cyber crime and terrorism and research degrees. Professional courses on offer include LLM law and legal practice (replacing the graduate diploma in law), the Legal Practice Course and related LLM legal practice and advanced drafting, and LLM professional legal practice. Students are taught in lectures, discussion groups and interactive seminars by academics with extensive industry experience.

In the Research Excellence Framework 2021, 87.5% of its research environment was rated internationally excellent and 78% of its research overall was rated as world-leading or internationally excellent. This research encompasses the school's numerous research centres including the Centre for Criminal Justice and Criminology, Cyber Threats Research Centre, The Institute of International Shipping and Trade Law, the Observatory on Human Rights of Children, and the Governance and Human Rights Research Group.

==== School of Social Sciences ====
The school offers courses in Criminology; Sociology and Social Policy, Economics, Education and Childhood Studies, and Politics, Philosophy and International Relations.

The School of Social Sciences through its politics course plays a leading role in the Welsh Economy Labour Markets Evaluation Research Centre (WELMERC), established in 2002 to research economic data related to Wales.

=== Medicine, Health and Life Science ===
==== Swansea University Medical School ====
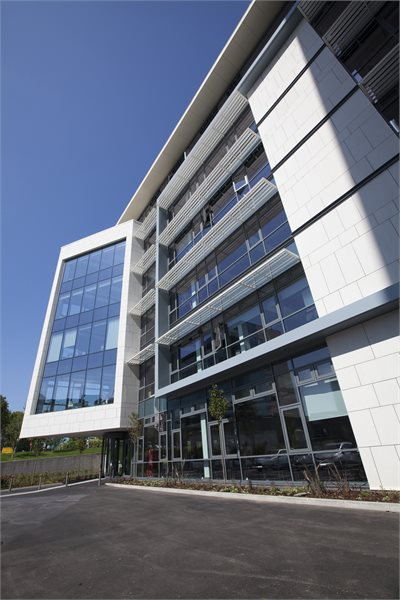
Swansea University Medical School – Data Science building

Swansea University Medical School is ranked fourth in the UK according to the Guardian University Guide 2022. In the 2014 and 2021 Research Excellence Framework its research impact was considered outstanding in terms of reach and significance.

Established in 2004, the Medical School works closely with government, industry and the NHS, in particular Abertawe Bro Morgannwg University Health Board, over teaching, research and innovation. It also has two Institute of Life Science research centres, equipped with clinical trials, medical imaging, research and business development facilities and a Centre for NanoHealth.

Its research highlights include DNA damage and the safety of nanomaterials, the control of fungal diseases, children and young people's mental health, avoiding unnecessary medical interventions, and cholesterol in human health and disease.

==== School of Health and Social Care ====
Swansea University's School of Health and Social Care offers courses in health and social care, healthcare science, nursing and midwifery, occupational therapy, osteopathy, operating department practice, paramedic science, and social work.

It ranks fourth in the UK for Health Studies in the Complete University Guide 2023 and in the top ten for Nursing in The Guardian University Guide 2022. Research centres include: the Centre for Global Burns Injury Policy and Research; Centre for Innovative Ageing; Lactation, Infant Feeding and Translational Research; Swansea Centre for Health Economics; Swansea Centre for Improvement and Innovation; Developing Evidence Enriched Practice (DEEP).

=== Science and Engineering ===
==== School of Mathematics and Computer Science ====
The School of Mathematics and Computer Science at Swansea University is located at the Computational Foundry on the Bay Campus, which is situated along the beachfront. This £32.5 million facility offers teaching and research amenities.

Technocamps is a pan-Wales school and community outreach unit, founded in 2003 by the employees of the Computer Science Department at Swansea University. It aims to address gaps in digital education throughout Wales. Over the years, Technocamps hubs were established in every university throughout Wales.

==== School of Engineering and Applied Sciences ====
Engineering

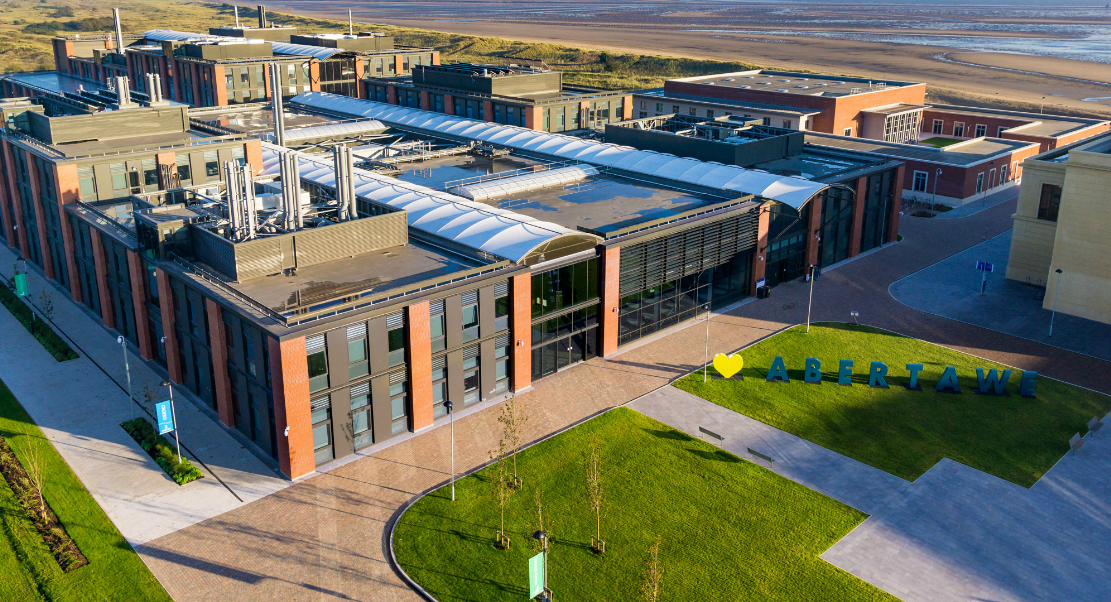
Swansea University engineering facilities

Engineering has been studied at Swansea University since its beginning in 1920, and the engineering departments are now based in two schools on the Bay Campus - the School of Engineering and Applied Science, and the School of Aerospace, Civil, Electrical, General and Mechanical Engineering.

In the 2021 Research Excellence Framework, Engineering at Swansea University rated a 100% world-leading and internationally excellent research environment.

Research centres in the schools include: Zienkiewicz Institute for Modelling, Data and AI; Materials Research Centre (MRC); Systems and Process Engineering Centre (SPEC); Future Manufacturing Research Institute (FMRI); Applied Sports, Technology, Exercise and Medicine Research Centre (A-STEM).

== Research ==
Swansea is a research-led university, ranking 48th in the UK in the 2021 Research Excellence Framework (REF). The university submitted the work of a record number of researchers (578) for assessment to REF2021, a 56% increase on the 370 submitted in 2014. It meant a growth in the university's overall proportion of world-leading and internationally excellent research from 80% in 2014 to 86% in 2021. Almost a third (32%) of its outputs were rated 4* world-leading (up from 21% in 2014), and 91% of its research environment is rated 4* world-leading or 3* internationally excellent, with 86% of its research judged outstanding and very considerable in terms of impact - reach and significance.

Medicine and Life Science continue to be ranked in the UK top five overall at 4th in Allied Health Professions (UOA3), and Mathematics is ranked joint 16th in the UK and is joint top for impact, with 100% rated as outstanding. Geography is ranked 20th in the UK, climbing 11 places with 90% 4* world-leading or 3* internationally excellent research. A third of the university's units of assessment rated 100% for their outstanding and very considerable impact.

=== Selected research centres and institutes ===
A side profile of the Institute of Life Sciences 2

- Centre for Nanohealth
- Research Institute for Arts and Humanities – which includes the Global Drug Policy Observatory
- Institute of Life Sciences
- Research Institute for Applied Social Sciences
- Welsh Institute of Cognitive Neuroscience
- SPECIFIC
- CSAR
- Energy Safety Research Institute (ESRI)

== Academic profile ==
=== Rankings and reputation ===
Rankings
National rankings
- Complete (2027): 41
- Guardian (2027): 25
- Times / Sunday Times (2027): 38

Global rankings
- ARWU (2026): 801–900
- QS (2027): 322=
- THE (2026): 351–375

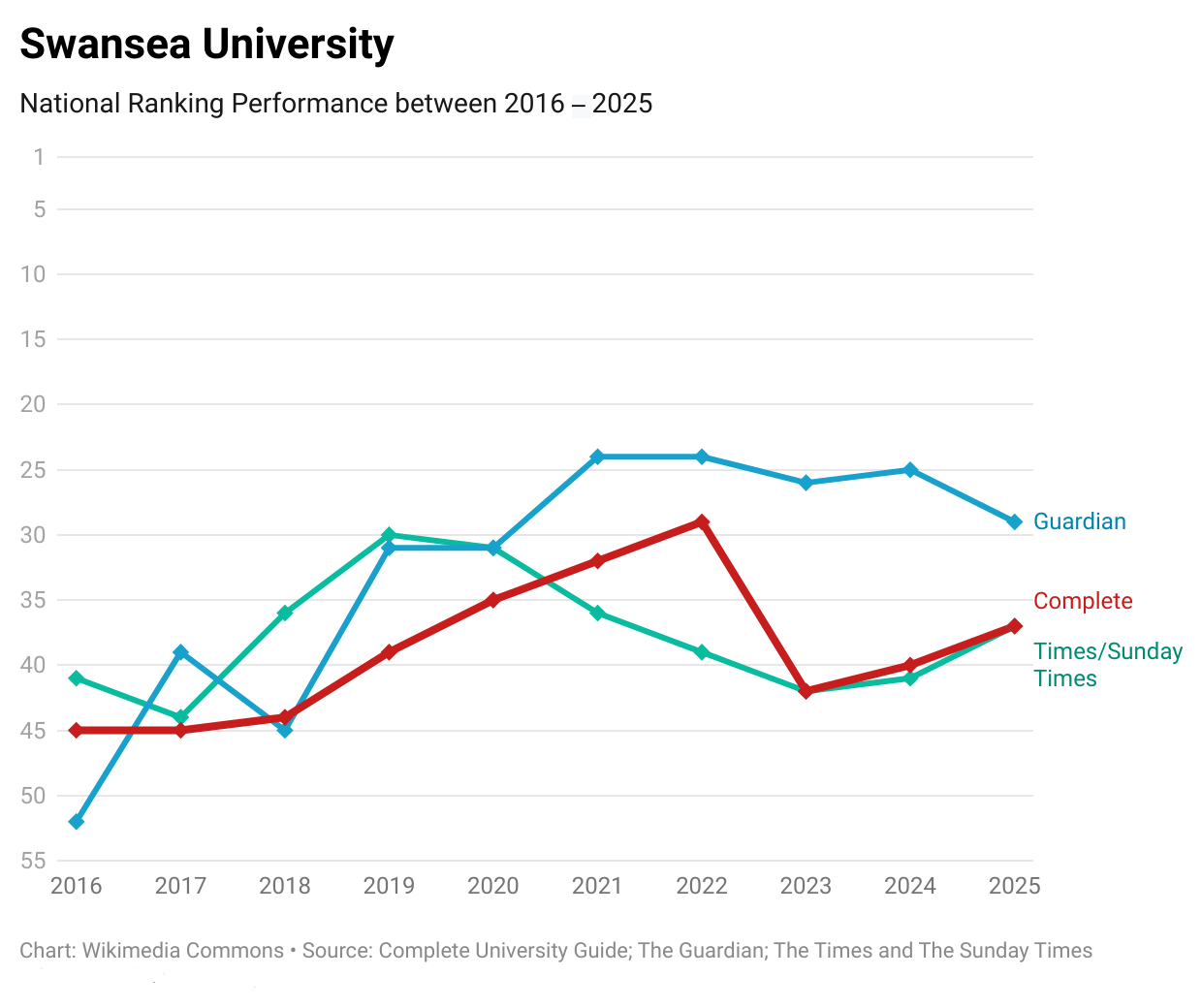
Swansea University's national league table performance over the past ten years

The university is listed as one of the top 500 universities in the World University Rankings. Swansea is ranked 32nd in the 2026 Guardian University Guide.

Swansea University's best ranked departments include Medicine and Mathematics, ranked 4th and 16th respectively in the 2021 Research Excellence Framework. The Law Department also ranks highly, coming in at 22nd in the Times Good University Guide 2019 in the UK, as well as in the 151–200 category in QS World Rankings. Overall, Swansea University is ranked 48th in the 2021 Research Excellence Framework.

National Student Survey results (for 2021) rank Swansea 12th in the UK for "overall satisfaction", with 82% saying they are satisfied with their course overall. The survey ranked Swansea number one for Archaeology; Biology (non-specific); English Language; and Others in Business and Management.

Swansea University is top in Wales in the 2023 Guardian University Guide and in the 2022 Student Crowd university rankings, which places it 15th in the UK.

=== International partnerships ===
In recent years, Swansea University has established many partnerships with leading universities in Europe, North America, Africa and Asia.

Swansea University has a strategic partnership with Wuhan Union Hospital in Wuhan, China. The hospital was founded by Swansea missionary Reverend Doctor Griffith John. As a result of this partnership, in 2015, the College of Medicine hosted the 2nd UK-China Medical Forum at Singleton Hospital. Swansea University has also established a joint medical centre at the Wuhan Union Hospital to engage in clinical collaboration. In 2020, the partnership enabled health experts from across Wales to learn from some of the first medics to tackle the COVID-19 pandemic.

in 2013, Swansea University established a partnership with Rice University and Texas A&M University. The universities collaborate on research as well as exchange visits by academics and students. Since then, the partnership has expanded to include six more partner institutions in Texas: University of Houston, University of Texas at Austin, Baylor College of Medicine, Houston Methodist Research Institute, University of Texas Health Science Center at Houston, and University of Texas Medical Branch at Galveston.

In 2012, Swansea University established a partnership with the Joseph Fourier University in Grenoble, France with the aim of beginning joint degree programmes, collaborative bids for European funding and student and staff exchanges particularly in the subject areas of Medicine, Computer Science and Engineering. This partnership has now grown to involve a community of universities and research organisations in the Rhone‐Alpes region of France with a combined student population of over 65,000. The partnership involves research collaboration, staff and student exchanges, and sharing facilities and best practice.

In 2007, the university set up a programme along with the local NHS trust, Abertawe Bro Morgannwg University Health Board, to establish a partnership with the School of Medicine at the University of the Gambia in The Gambia. The purpose of this partnership is to improve health care outcomes as well as collaborate on clinical care, health service delivery, teaching and research. This programme also provides opportunity for local doctors and medical students to pursue a placement in either the Gambia or Swansea Bay. In December 2014, this programme was awarded a United Nations Gold Star for its contribution to the improvement of Gambian health outcomes.

Swansea University collaborates with Navitas with International College Wales Swansea to provide foundation, 1st year degree and Pre-Masters programmes on campus.

In 2021, Swansea University launched a Sports and Exercise Science partnership with the University of Canberra in Australia and Swansea also offers a dual degree programme with Trent University in Canada. Since its inception in 2016, Swansea University has been a member of the Jiangsu–UK 20+20 World-Class University Consortium, involving more than 30 universities from the UK and Jiangsu Province in China.

== Student life ==
Flag of Swansea University

Swansea University Students' Union (Welsh: Undeb Myfyrwyr Prifysgol Abertawe) is the students' union for Swansea University. Known as the SU, it supports more than 170 student clubs including African-Caribbean, Chinese, Hellenic and Indian societies, among others. The Union runs student bars and nightclubs, a travel shop offering trips around the UK and Europe, a radio station, nursery, launderette and shops. Profits are reinvested into improving the student experience, including supporting students through its advice and support centre.

Services include money advice and support office, student counselling, a health centre, dentist, chaplains, an academic success programme, specialist tuition and residential services.

=== Sports ===
Sport Swansea offers more than 50 sports clubs and has over 5000 active members, covering sports ranging from rugby and aikido, dodgeball, and hockey to tae kwon do.

Swansea and Cardiff University compete in an annual varsity competition, known as the Welsh version of the Oxbridge event, which includes the Welsh Varsity rugby match and The Welsh Boat Race.

Most of Swansea University's individual and team training takes place at the Swansea Bay Sports Park off campus on Sketty Lane. In the same complex as the Wales National Pool, the Sports Village is home to outdoor football and rugby pitches, a running track, an indoor athletics centre, hockey pitches, racquet courts and a gym, which is open to both students and the general public. Several sports clubs also use facilities on the Bay Campus.

=== Student media ===
Xtreme Radio is the radio station of the university, run by students. It was founded in November 1968 as Action Radio, making it the third oldest student radio station in the UK and oldest in Wales. It broadcasts to various areas around campus and is available worldwide on the internet. The station plays a wide variety of music, as well as having a number of specialist programmes including talk and sports shows. The Students' Union also runs the Waterfront news service and SUTV television.

=== Student accommodation ===
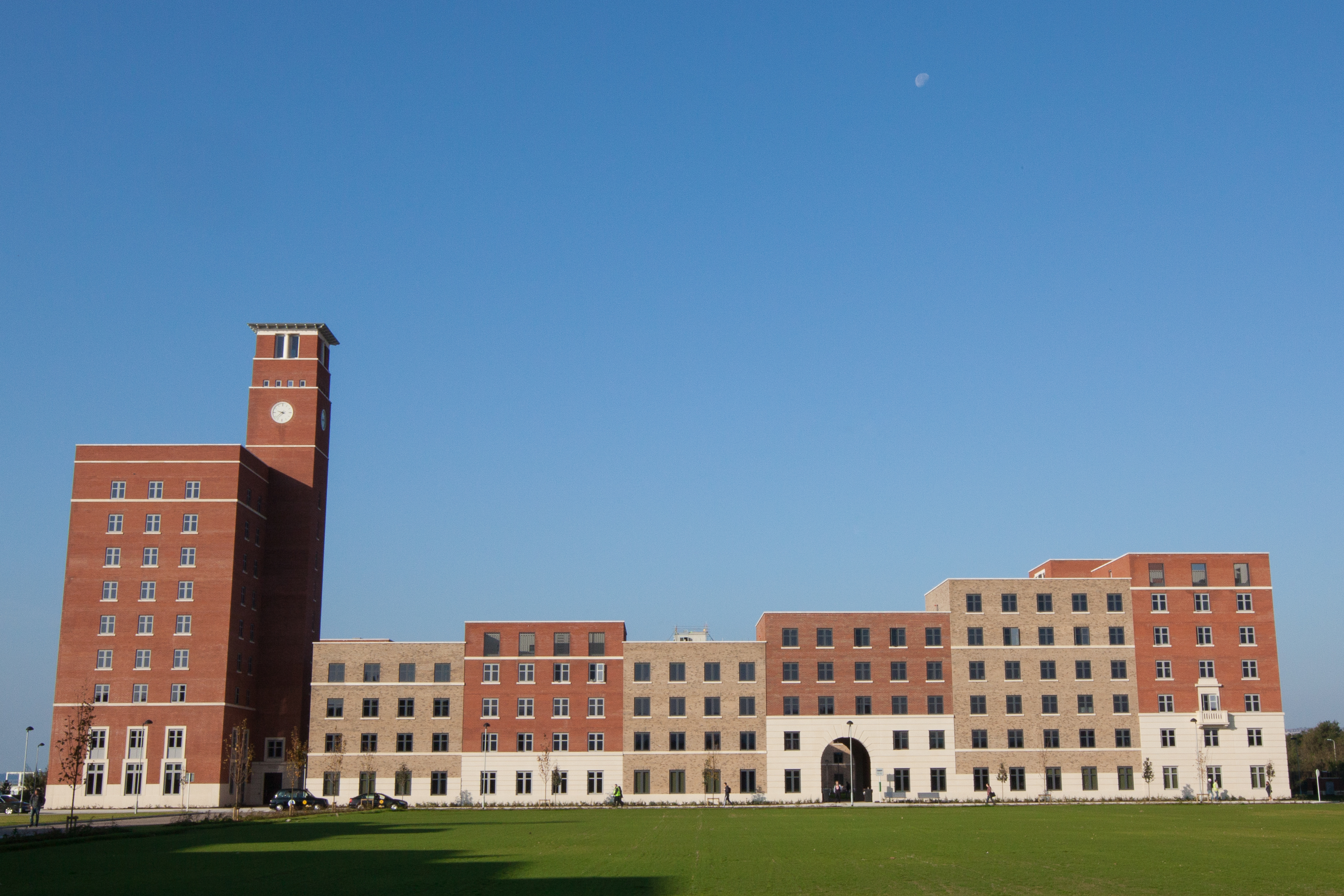
Bay Campus Accommodation

Swansea University provides approximately 3200 places in university halls across its two campuses, as well as some 1300 in the purpose-built Hendrefoilan Student Village, with 686 places, and more in off-campus residences at Beck House. Hendrefoilan Student Village will be closing in June 2023.

There are also a number of university managed properties in the Uplands and Brynmill areas of the city.

==== Hendrefoilan Student Village ====
The Hendrefoilan estate was 2.5 miles from the Singleton Park campus, just off the main Swansea to Gower road, set amongst mature woodland with open grassy areas. The student village has since closed and been redeveloped into a housing estate.

==== Bay Campus halls ====
Bay Campus has 2000 rooms in a mix of twin, en-suite, premium en-suite and wheelchair accessible rooms, as well as 1 & 2-bed flats for singles or couples. They also have Welsh Language flats on site.

==== Singleton Campus halls ====
Penmaen and Horton buildings seen from Singleton Park

There are nine halls that make up the campus residences providing accommodation to around 1182 students. The halls offer a combination of part and self-catered rooms and a choice of standard or ensuite study rooms. Three of these halls (Caswell, Langland and Oxwich) were completed in 2004 and the original halls (Kilvey, Preseli, Rhossili and Cefn Bryn, formerly known as Sibly, Lewis Jones, Mary Williams Annexe and Mary Williams respectively) have undergone some refurbishment in recent years. Penmaen and Horton are the newest addition to the campus residences providing 351 self-catered, ensuite study rooms. Many rooms have views over the bay or across the park.

==== Tŷ Beck / Beck House ====
Tŷ Beck consists of six large Victorian town houses situated in the Uplands area of Swansea, approximately a mile from the Singleton campus. It predominantly provides rooms for postgraduates and students with families, as well as overseas exchange students.

== Notable alumni and academics ==
=== Academics ===
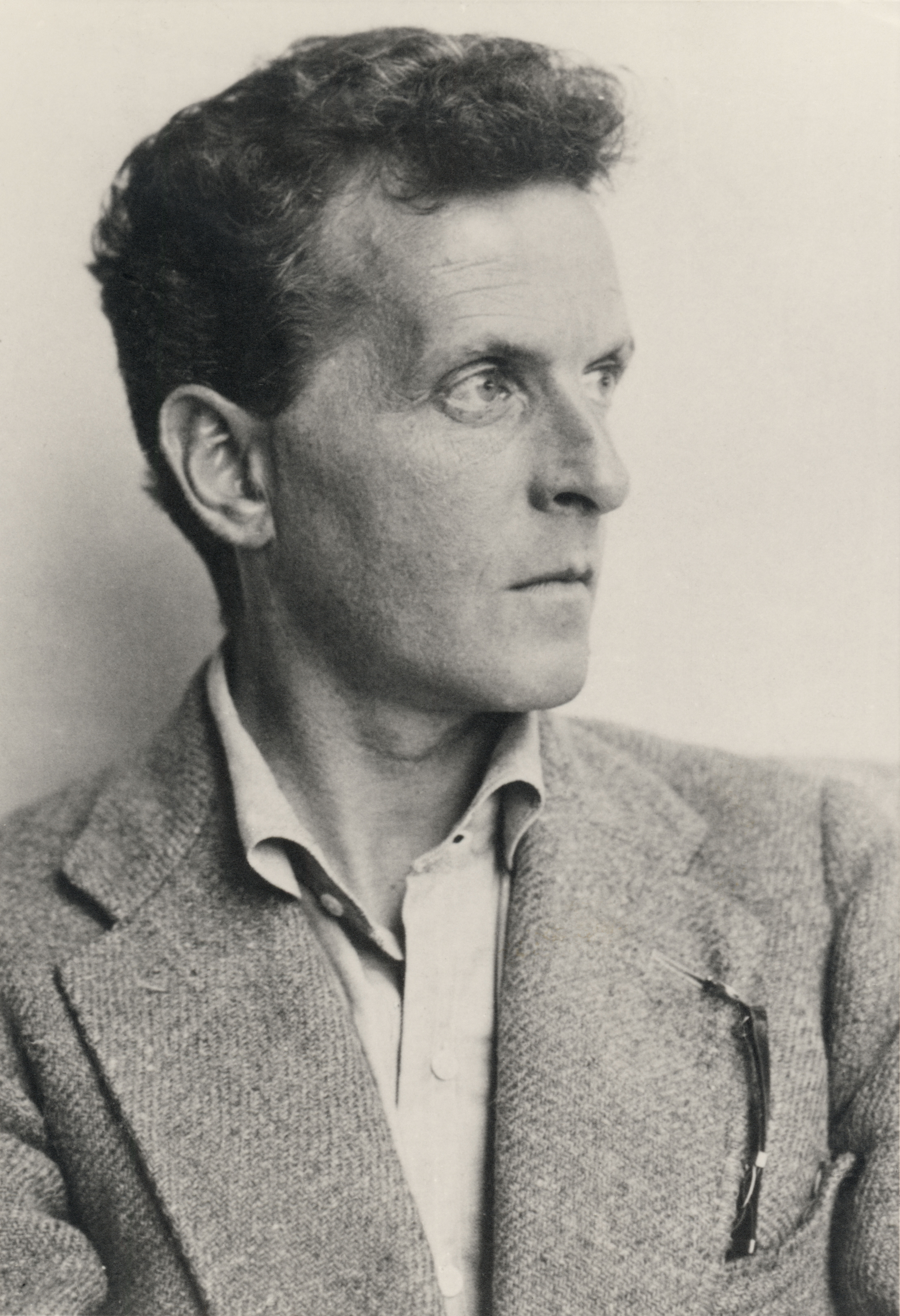
Ludwig Wittgenstein, philosopher

- Sir Kingsley William Amis English lecturer
- Andrew R Barron, Ser Cymru Chair of Low Carbon Energy and Environment; director and founder of ESRI
- Amy Brown, professor of child health
- Dame June Clark, professor of nursing
- Siwan Davies, professor of climate science
- Leighton Evans, professor of media theory
- Ralph A. Griffiths, emeritus professor of medieval history
- C. E. M. Hansel, emeritus professor of experimental psychology
- A. E. Heath, professor of philosophy
- Julian Hopkin, founder of medical school; awarded CBE in 2011 for service to medicine
- Christine James, professor of Welsh
- Gareth Jenkins, director of research of the medical school; a "Research Leader" for Health and Care Research Wales
- Matt Jones, human–computer interaction.
- Hilary Lappin-Scott, chair in microbiology and pro-vice chancellor for strategic development and external relations
- Jon Latimer, historian
- Keith Lloyd, dean and head of medical school; chair of Welsh Psychiatric Society
- Ronan Lyons, clinical professor of public health; director of the National Centre for Population Health and Wellbeing Research; director of the Farr Institute Centre for the Improvement of Population Health
- Robin Milner, computer scientist
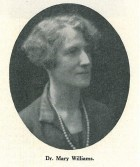
- Professor Mary Williams pioneer in medieval literature
  Florence Annie Mockeridge, botanist, dean of science 1933–35
- Tavi Murray, glacioloigist
- Yamni Nigam, entomologist and professor for anatomy & physiology
- James G. Oldroyd, mathematician and noted rheologist
- David Olive, physicist
- Gyan Pande, emeritus professor
- Clive Ponting, reader in international relations
- Dewi Zephaniah Phillips, prominent Wittgenstinian philosopher of religion
- Valerie Randle, professor in metallurgy
- Rush Rhees, philosopher
- Penny Sartori, British Medical/Nursing Researcher on Near-death studies
- Martin Sheldon, Professor of Reproductive Immunobiology; Editor of American Journal of Reproductive Immunology; Fellow of the Royal College of Veterinary Surgeons
- Andrew Tettenborn, professor of law
- John Williams, led establishment of Postgraduate Medical School; founding president of Welsh Association for Gastroenterology and Endoscopy
- Mary Williams, Chair of Modern Languages
- Ludwig Wittgenstein, philosopher; spent six months in 1941 writing and teaching at Swansea University
- Olgierd Zienkiewicz, pioneer of computational methods for engineering

=== Alumni ===
==== Academia ====
- Peter Cottrell, novelist and historian
- Tom Crick, Professor of Digital Society and Policy at the University of Bristol and Chief Ccientific Adviser to the UK Government's Department for Culture, Media and Sport
- Paul Dolan, behavioural scientist
- Geraint Jones (educator), Professor in Education, Founder & CEO of National Institute of Teaching & Education (NITE)
- Paul Moorcraft, Professor in Journalism, Media and Cultural Studies at Cardiff University
- D.Z. Phillips, philosopher
- Maggie Telfer, health activist
- Kenneth Tew, pharmacologist, academic and author
- Geoffrey Thomas, President of Kellogg College, Oxford
- Dame Jean Thomas, first female Master at St Catharine's College, Cambridge
- Colin H. Williams, sociolinguist
- Sir Glanmor Williams, religious historian

==== Arts ====
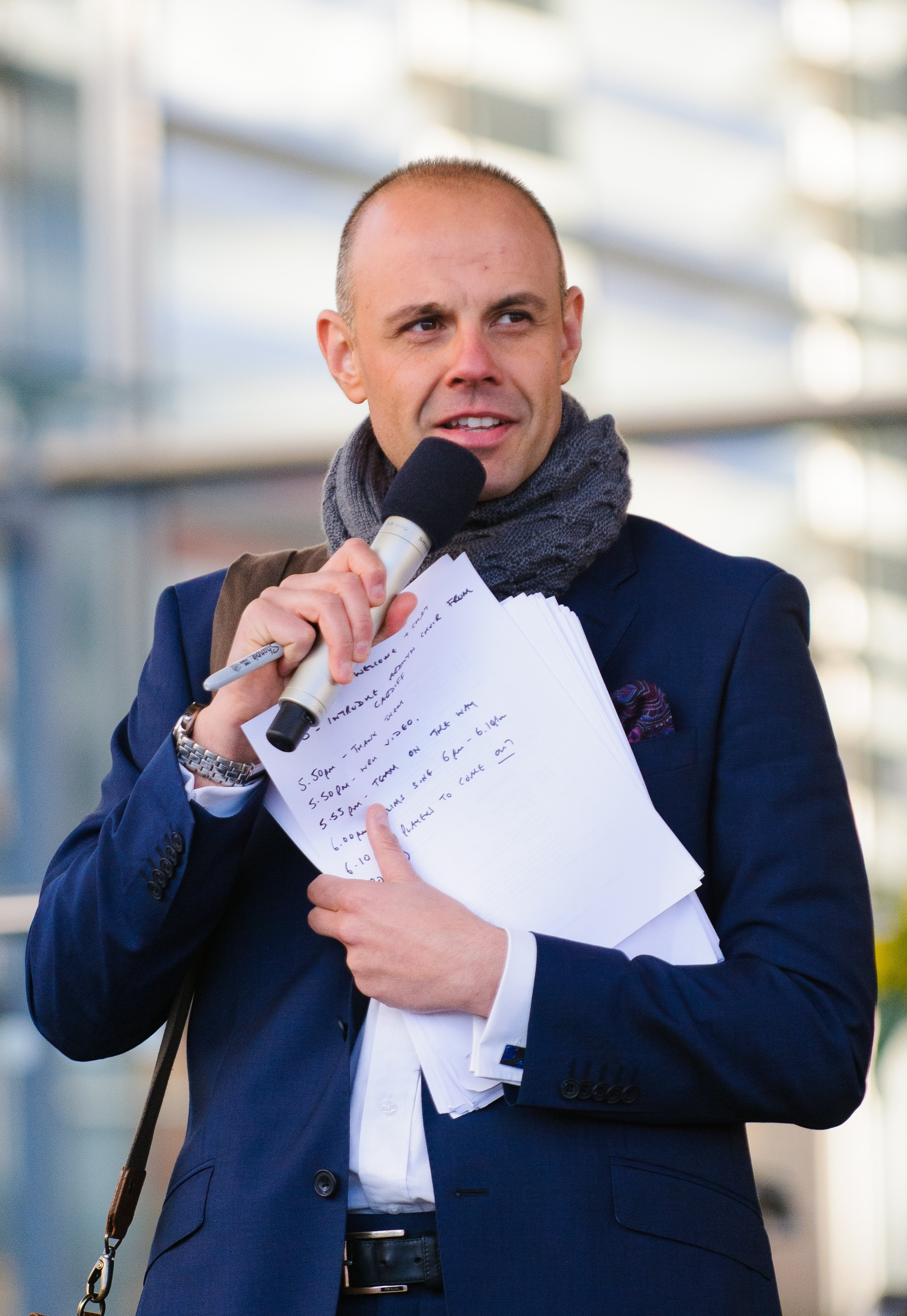
Jason Mohammad, presenter

- Annabelle Apsion, television and film actress
- Richey Edwards, member of rock group Manic Street Preachers
- Stuart Forster, travel journalist and photographer
- John Greening, poet, editor and critic
- Jonathan Hill, presenter of Wales Tonight on ITV Wales
- Jason Mohammad, television/radio presenter for BBC Wales
- Mavis Nicholson, writer and television broadcaster
- Jonny Owen, Welsh actor, Shameless and Svengali Internet series
- Charlie Williams, author of The Mangel Trilogy
- Urien Wiliam, Welsh language novelist and playwright
- Nicky Wire, member of rock group Manic Street Preachers

==== Business ====
- Ron Jones, Director of Tinopolis
- Paul Pindar, Chief Executive of Capita
- Ratan Tata, Indian industrialist, investor, philanthropist, and a former chairman of Tata Sons who serves as its chairman emeritus.

==== Law ====
- Samuel Kwame Adibu Asiedu, Justice of the Supreme Court of Ghana
- Olga Sánchez Cordero, former Justice of the Mexican Supreme Court of Justice of the Nation and former Secretary of the Interior of Mexico

=== Politics ===
==== Welsh Parliament (Senedd) ====
- Peter Black, MS for South Wales West
- Andrew Davies, former MS for Swansea West; former minister for finance and public service delivery, Welsh Government
- Mike Hedges, MS for Swansea East
- Val Lloyd, former MS for Swansea East

==== Houses of Parliament ====
- Lord Anderson of Swansea, former MP
- Mims Davies, MP for Eastleigh and Wales Office Minister
- Caroline Dinenage, MP for Gosport and Minister for Care
- Nigel Evans, MP for Ribble Valley
- Hywel Francis, former MP for Aberavon
- Sylvia Heal, former MP and former Deputy Speaker of the House of Commons
- Sian James, former MP for Swansea East
- Anne Main, former MP for St Albans
- Rod Richards, former MP for North West Clwyd; former AM for North Wales
- John Sewel, Baron Sewel, former Deputy Speaker of the House of Lords
- Mark Tami, MP for Alyn and Deeside

==== International ====
- Shekhar Dutt, former governor of the Indian state of Chhattisgarh
- Stanislaus A. James, Governor-general of Saint Lucia, 1988–1996
- Isatou Njie-Saidy, Vice President of The Gambia
- Wictor Sajeni, Deputy Minister of Primary Education in the Malawian government
- Christian Saunders, United Nations official
- Dhirendra Nath Buragohain, founder director of IIT Guwahati

==== Science, engineering and technology ====
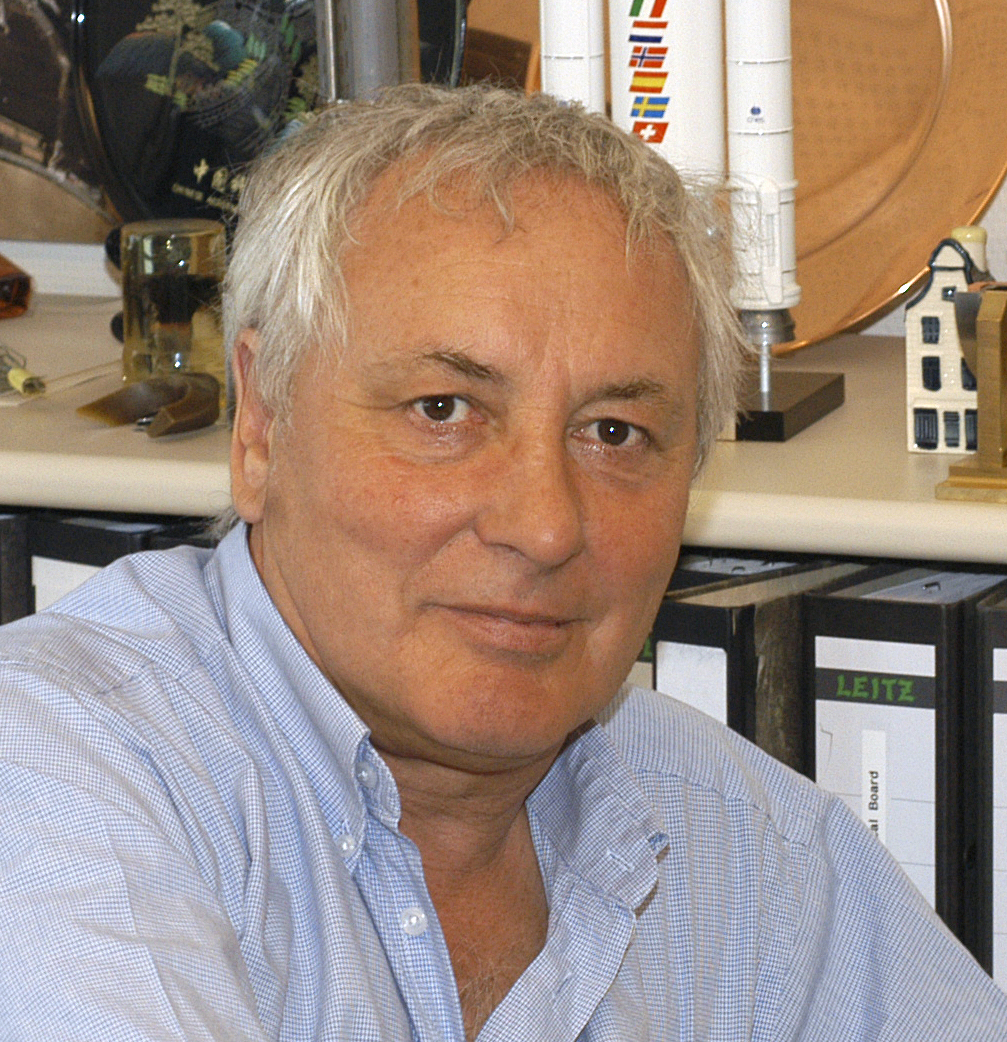
Lyn Evans, Welsh physicist

- Sir Jonathan Asbridge, former president of the Nursing and Midwifery Council
- Anne Borsay Chair in Medical Humanities
- Edward George Bowen, radiophysicist
- Alan Cox (shared with University of Wales, Aberystwyth), Linux pioneer
- Beris Cox, biostratigrapher and palaeontologist.
- Jonathan Elphick, ornithologist and zoologist
- Lyn Evans,, Project Leader, Large Hadron Collider, CERN
- Andy Hopper, co-founder of Acorn Computers Ltd
- Lionel Kelleway, natural history broadcaster
- Sir Terry Matthews, technological entrepreneur
- Colin Pillinger, planetary scientist
- Graham Ryder, geologist, lunar scientist, posthumous winner of the Barringer Medal in 2003
- Sir John Meurig Thomas, chemist
- Evan James Williams, physicist

==== Sports ====
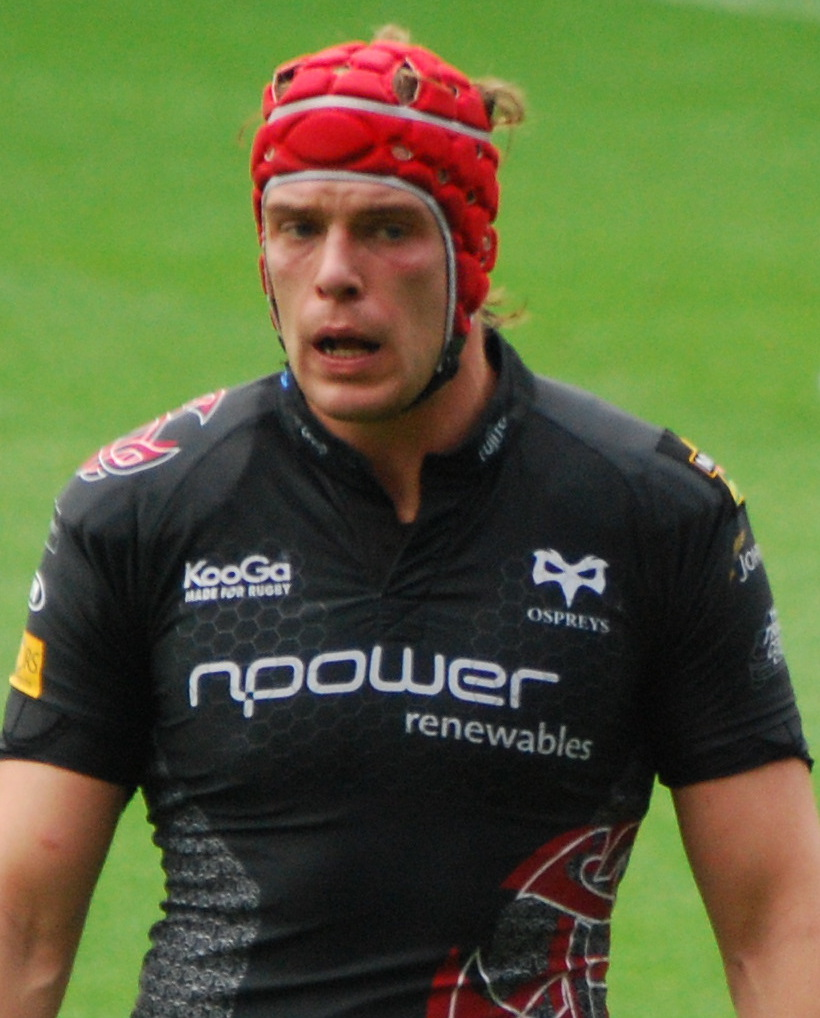
Alun Wyn Jones, Welsh rugby union international

- Guillem Bauzà, football player for Swansea City
- Daniel Caines, athlete
- Jazmin Carlin, British Olympic swimmer
- Mike Hooper, former Liverpool goalkeeper
- Rob Howley, Wales and British Lions rugby union international
- Liz Johnson, gold medal winner at Beijing Paralympics in swimming
- Alun Wyn Jones, Welsh rugby union international
- Simon Jones, Glamorgan and England cricketer
- John McFall, Paralympic sprinter
- Fen Paw – Wales international rugby union player. Played in Wales' first women's international match in 1987 whilst at the university.
- Dwayne Peel, Welsh rugby union international
- Rhys Priestland, Welsh rugby union international
- James Roberts, Paralympic rower and sitting volleyball
- David Smith, boccia
- Chris White, English international rugby referee
- Marcus Wyatt, World Cup skeleton racer

== See also ==
- Armorial of UK universities
- Academic dress of the University of Wales
- Education in Wales
- List of universities in Wales
- List of UK universities
- Singleton Abbey
- Technium
