= Health and Care Research Wales =

Welsh health research organisation

- Ymchwil lechyd a Gofal Cymru (Welsh)
- Founder: Welsh Government
- Purpose: Research
- Headquarters: Cardiff, Wales
- Affiliations: NHS Wales
- Funding: Governmental
- Website: Official website

Health and Care Research Wales (Welsh: Ymchwil lechyd a Gofal Cymru) is a collaborative health research organisation established in 2015 with support from the Welsh Government. It fosters partnerships with entities across NHS Wales, universities, research institutions, and local authorities. The organisation collaborates extensively with government agencies, research funders, industry partners, patients, the public, and stakeholders to advance healthcare research and knowledge.

== Governance ==
The leadership of Health and Care Research Wales is under Kieran Walshe, who serves as Chief Advisor for Research in the Population Healthcare Directorate and Director within the Research and Development Division of the Welsh Government. The organisation is accountable to the Minister for Health and Social Services through the Research and Development Division and the Chief Medical Officer.

== Projects ==
The Wales COVID-19 Evidence Centre emerged in 2021, funded by Health and Care Research Wales, serving as a hub for research, evidence, and knowledge guiding the Welsh Government's response to the COVID-19 pandemic in Wales.

In January 2023, Health and Care Research Wales announced a funding injection exceeding £2 million for the Experimental Cancer Medicine Centre in Cardiff to advance research on cancer treatments. Additionally, in February 2023, Health and Care Research Wales unveiled plans to establish its own evidence centre, dedicated to addressing health and social care issues in Wales. The Health and Care Research Wales Evidence Centre was officially inaugurated in April 2023.
