= Frank Field =

Frank Field may refer to:

- Frank Field, Baron Field of Birkenhead (1942–2024), British politician
- Frank Field (Australian politician) (1904–1985), Australian politician
- Frank Field (meteorologist) (1923–2023), American meteorologist
- Frank Field (cricketer, born 1874) (1874–1934), English cricketer who played for Warwickshire
- Frank Field (cricketer, born 1908) (1908–1981), English cricketer who played for Worcestershire
- Frank H. Field (1922–2013), American scientist
- Frank Field (footballer) (1879–1963), Australian rules footballer

== See also ==
- Francis Field (disambiguation)
- Frank Fielding (born 1988), English footballer
- Frank Fields (1914–2005), American musician
- Franklin Field (disambiguation)
