= Groningen gas field =

Largest methane field in Europe

Coordinates: 53.3°N 6.8°E

Groningen
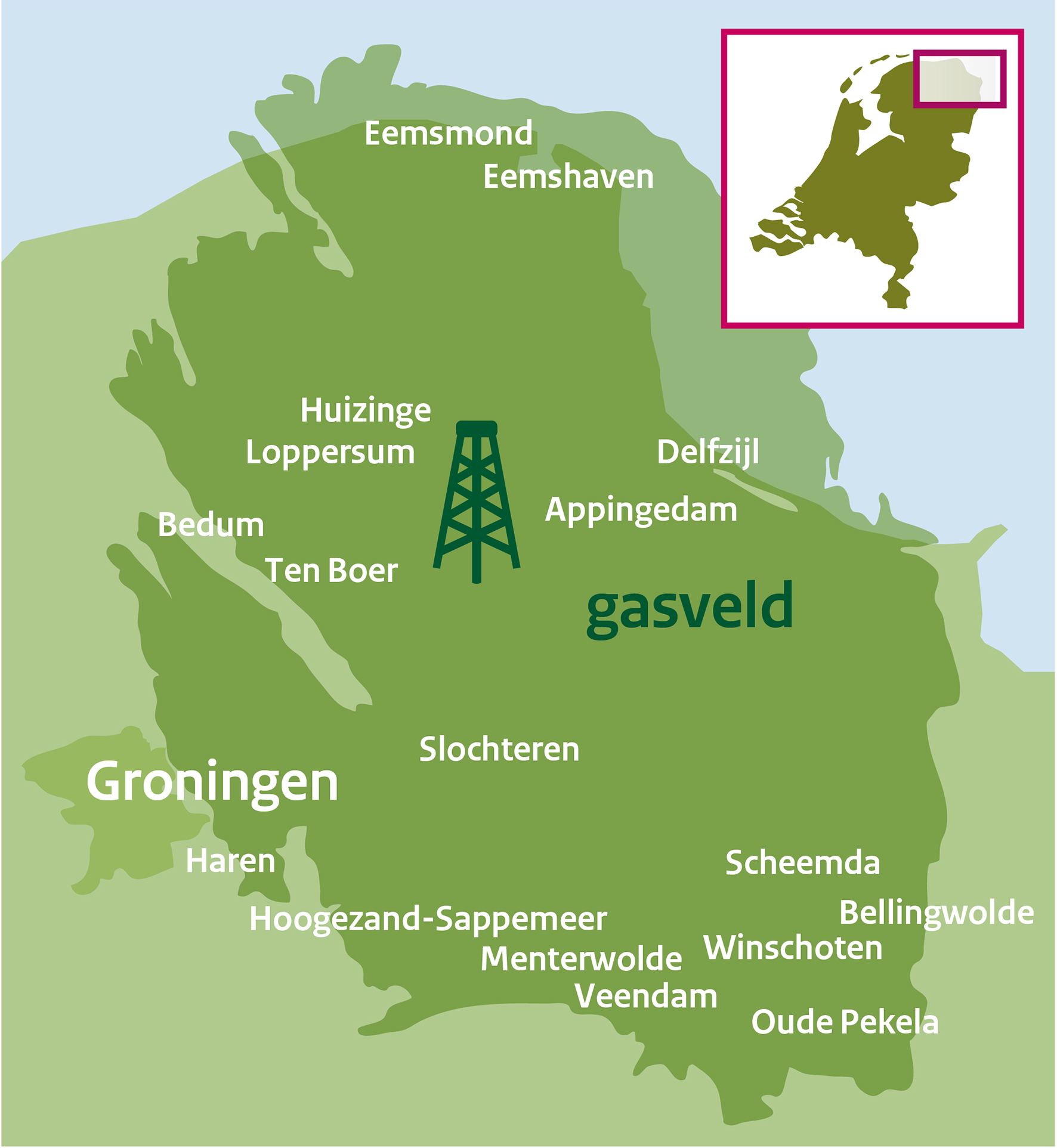
- Country: Netherlands
- Region: Groningen
- Offshore/onshore: Onshore
- Operator: Nederlandse Aardolie Maatschappij (NAM)

Field history
- Discovery: 1959
- Start of development: 1959
- Start of production: 1963
- Peak year: 1976
- Abandonment: 2024

Production
- Current production of gas: 93×10^{6} m^{3}/d 3.3×10^{9} cu ft/d
- Estimated gas in place: 2.8×10^{12} m^{3} 100×10^{12} cu ft
- Producing formations: Slochteren Formation

The Groningen gas field is a methane field in Groningen province in the northeastern part of the Netherlands. With an estimated 2,740 billion cubic metres of recoverable methane (most of which has already been extracted), it is the largest methane field in Europe (Note: if not counting Shtokman field offshore Russia) and one of the largest in the world.

The gas field was discovered in 1959 near Slochteren, in the northeast of the Netherlands. The subsequent extraction of methane became central to the energy supply in the Netherlands. Virtually the entire country was connected to Groningen gas in the following years. Revenue from methane production became important in the post-war development and construction of the Dutch welfare state. As of 2013, 2,057 billion cubic metres of methane had been extracted from the field.

Gas extraction resulted in subsidence above the field. From 1991, this was also accompanied by earthquakes, which led to damage to houses and unrest among residents. It was decided to phase out gas extraction from 2014 onwards. The reinforcement operation and damage settlement as a result of the earthquakes are progressing slowly. The National Ombudsman called this a "national crisis" in 2021.

In June 2023, the Dutch government announced that extraction from the field would cease by 1 October 2023. Approximately 450 billion cubic metres of gas are thought to remain in the field as of 2023.

== History ==
=== Discovery ===
Methane was initially mainly a by-product of petroleum, which was more economically attractive. In 1948, the Nederlandse Aardolie Maatschappij (NAM), jointly owned by Shell and Esso, discovered a methane field in the Netherlands for the first time near Coevorden. This gave rise to the expectation that more methane fields could be found in the Netherlands. In the north and east of the country they searched for gas fields, including near the later Groningen gas field. In 1954 and 1955, drilling at Haren and Vlagtwedde yielded nothing. On 24 October 1955, when seeking oil at Thesinge, methane was found in the Zechstein formation, but they drilled 40 to 50 meters too shallow to discover the Groningen gas field.

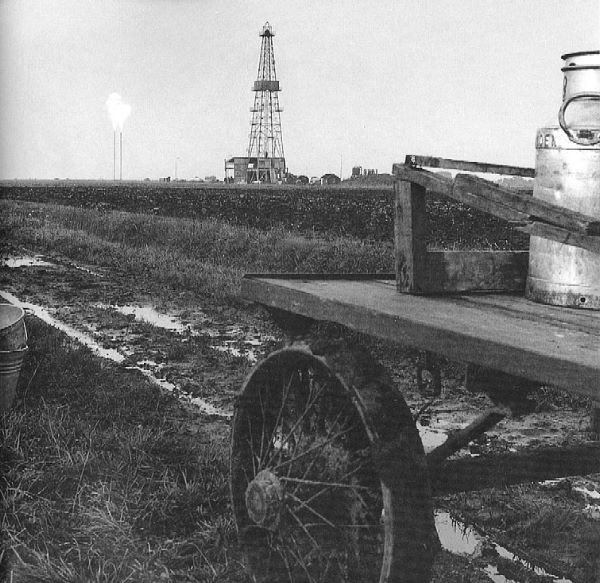
Drilling tower with flare stack above Groningen gas field

On 29 May 1959, the NAM started exploratory research on land owned by farmer Kees Boon, near Kolham in the municipality of Slochteren. Two months later on July 22, the drilling led to the discovery of methane for the first time. Initially it received little media attention, because little was known about the field's size at the time. The flaring did attract local attention. The fact that it was a large gas field became clear when gas was found near Delfzijl in 1960. The properties of that methane matched those of Slochteren, so had to be the same gas field. These findings about the size were initially kept secret, also from NAM shareholder Esso.

The size was not made public until 14 October 1960. A Belgian newspaper reported on a speech by Belgian Member of the European Parliament Victor Leemans, in which he mentioned that the Netherlands had found a gas field of 300 billion m^{3}. The cabinet responded to parliamentary questions that a large amount of methane had indeed been found, but kept it at 60 billion m^{3}. Behind closed doors, it was then estimated at a maximum of 100 billion m^{3}.

=== Concession ===
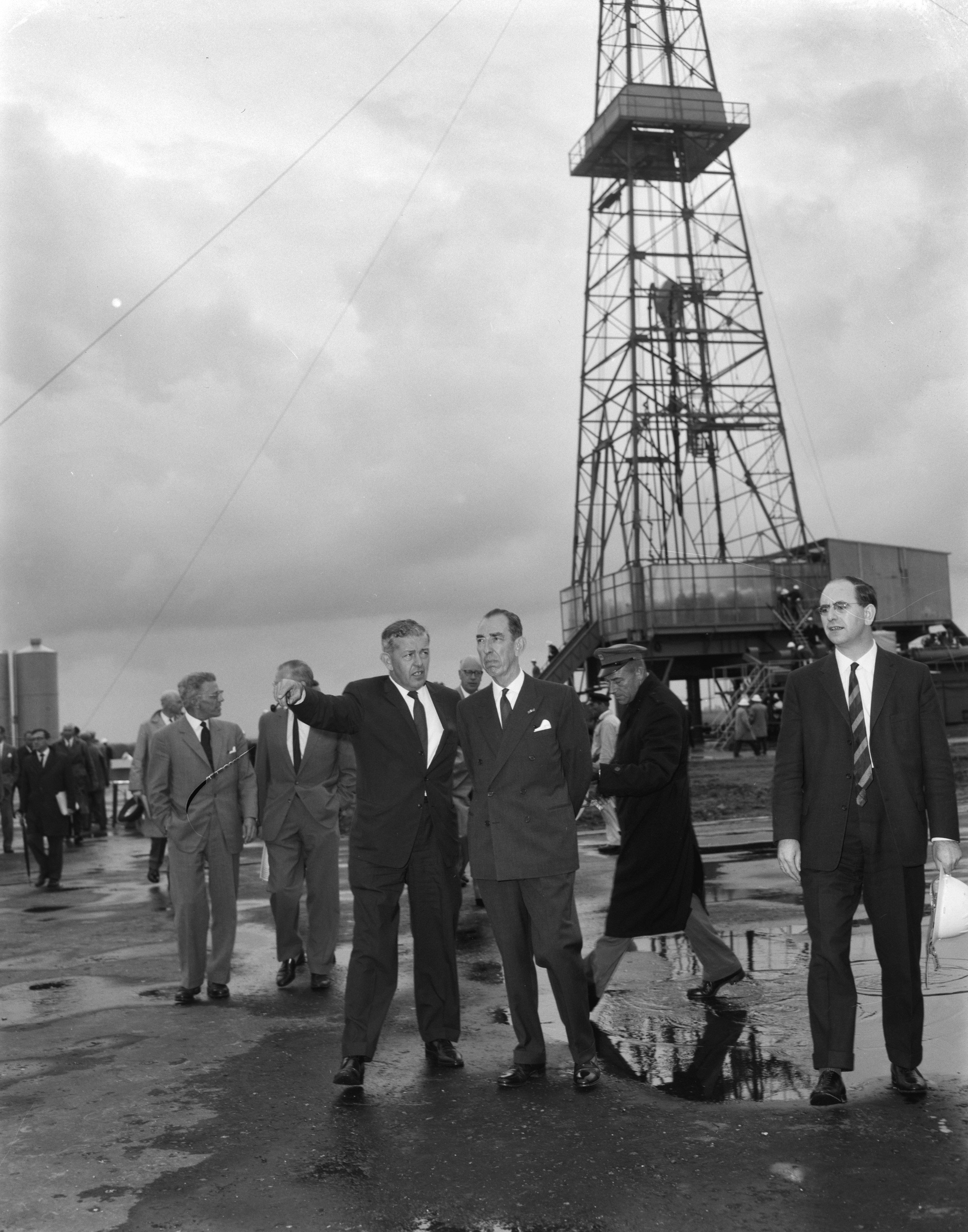
NAM-CEO Jo Bongaerts, Queen's commissioner Cees Fock and Minister of Economic Affairs Jan de Pous (left to right) at the official opening of the Groningen gas field on 25 July 1963.

After the discovery, NAM applied for the concession for the field. At the initiative of Esso employee Douglass Stewart, NAM planned to sell the gas directly to households. The Dutch government had previously committed itself to purchasing all methane extracted in the Netherlands. The size of the Groningen gas field made this promise financially untenable. Minister of Economic Affairs Jan de Pous entered into negotiations with NAM about gas extraction. Shell and Esso initially wanted a substantial majority share in the extraction and sale, to the disapproval of De Pous. On the other hand, the Labour Party wanted a greater role for the government. Member of Parliament Anne Vondeling argued for complete nationalization. After more than a year and a half of negotiations, De Pous sent his plan to the Tweede Kamer on 17 July 1962. This regulated the tasks of various parties, with this division of tasks and responsibilities later becoming known as the Gasgebouw.

It was decided to regulate the exploitation of the Groningen field in the Maatschap Groningen (Groningen Partnership). In this partnership, the Dutch government, through the Nederlandse Staatsmijnen (later DSM and EBN), had a 40% interest and NAM had a 60% interest. The decision to create a partnership was intended to conceal the fact that the Dutch government participated in methane extraction. With this they tried, among other things, to prevent sheikhs in the Middle East from following the Dutch example of also claiming profits from Shell and Esso, who extracted oil there. At that time, the deliberate avoidance of transparency was already criticized by, among others, the Minister of Justice Albert Beerman.

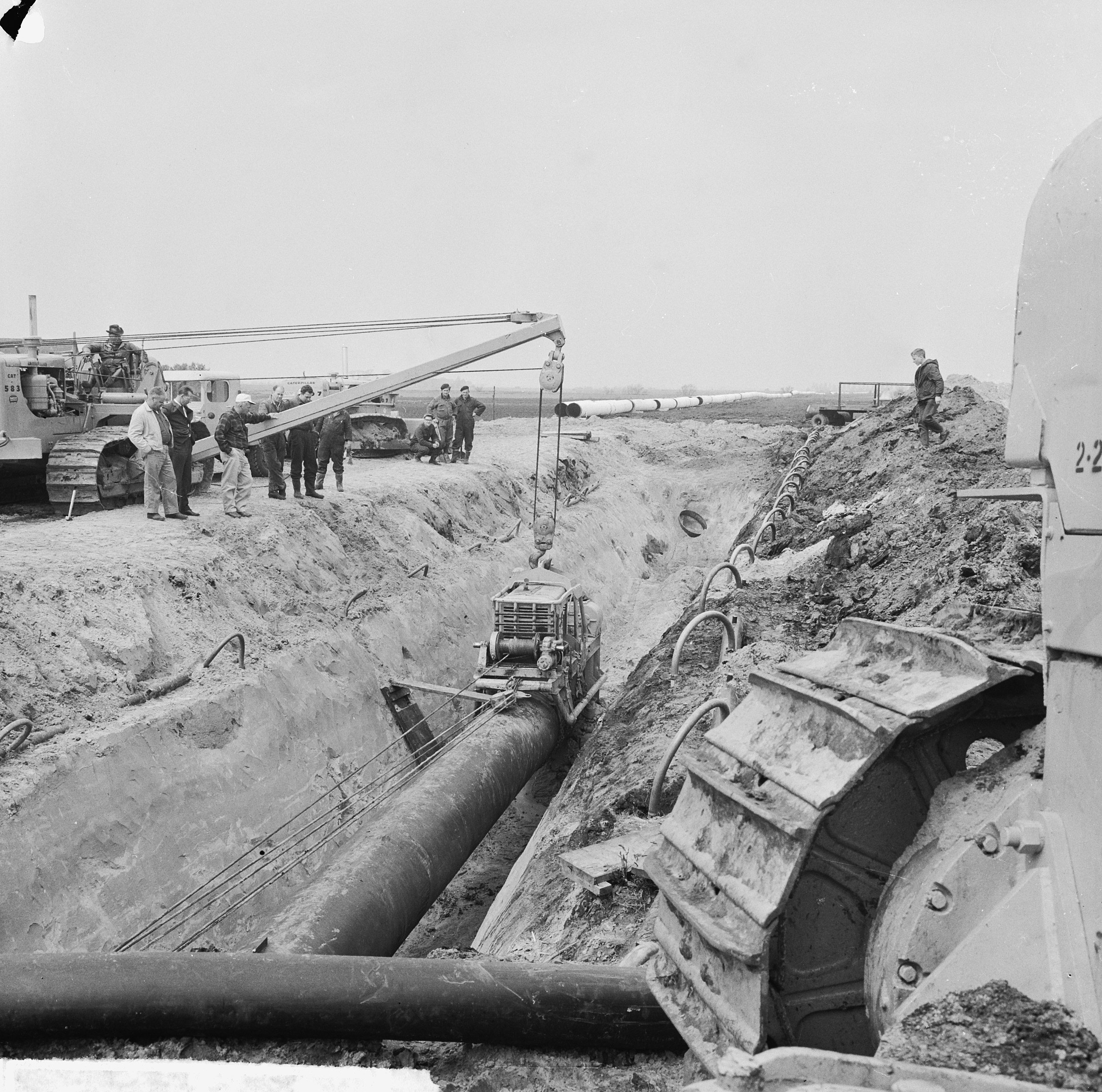
Construction of pipelines for Groningen gas (1964)

In the plan, the foundations were also laid for the establishment of the Gasunie. 10% of its shares were directly owned by the Dutch state, 40% by the Staatsmijnen and 50% shared by Shell and Esso. The Gasunie was given the task of laying a pipeline network to connect the whole of the Netherlands to Groningen gas. In cities where town gas was already being used, the existing pipes were used. In December 1968, it was celebrated that Egmond aan Zee was the last municipality to be connected to Groningen methane. (Note: The Wadden Sea island Vlieland was the very last to be connected to methane in 1986.)

A Cooperation Agreement was signed on 4 March 1963 by the Staatsmijnen, NAM, Shell and Esso. In this agreement, further agreements were written down between the parties. (Note: It was agreed that the content of the agreement would remain secret, partly because of company-sensitive information. In 2018, the document leaked and was released.) On 30 May 1963 the concession was then granted to NAM.

=== Resistance ===
The plans were largely supported by the Dutch House of Representatives. Only the Groningen Member of Parliament Arend Biewenga noted that gas extraction in the United States and Italy had led to subsidence. According to De Pous this was not the case with the Groningen gas field and this would otherwise be reimbursed by the NAM and Staatsmijnen. In an article in the Nieuwsblad van het Noorden, engineer Willem Meiborg warned on 8 November 1963 about subsidence. He predicted subsidence of up to one meter. He asked to set aside money for the consequences. Publicly, NAM denied Meiborg's prediction, but secretly ordered an investigation. The investigation confirmed that subsidence could occur, as much as 1.5 meters. The research was shared with the province of Groningen, but was not made public. It only became public when D66 Member of Parliament Jan Terlouw found out about the research in 1972 and asked parliamentary questions about it.

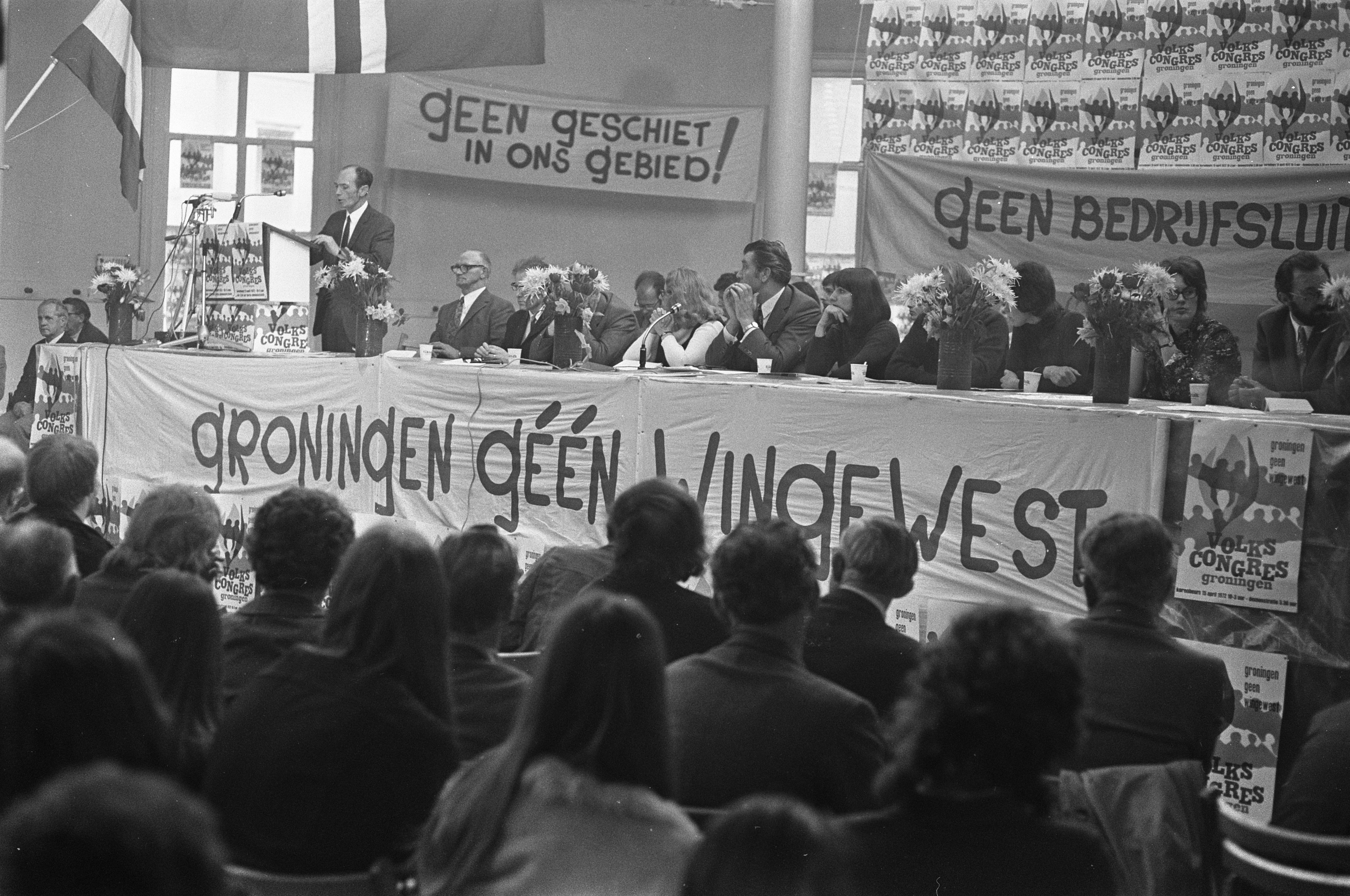
People's Congress in Groningen, 15 April 1972. In the middle sits Fré Meis.

On paper, the discovery of the gas field made Groningen the richest region in the Netherlands. Some in Groningen were pleased with the jobs created by gas extraction. Others thought that the economically disadvantaged province was not benefiting enough from the extraction. The methane revenues flowed into the national budget, which created the sentiment that Groningen was being used as a wingewest, roughly meaning "exploitation territory" or an area exploited for resources without any beneficial returns. Prominently, CPN politician Fré Meis from Groningen complained about what he regarded as injustice. Between 1972 and 1980, the CPN therefore organized four instances of a People's Congress to draw attention to this. This sentiment returned regularly in the decades that followed.

=== Small fields policy ===
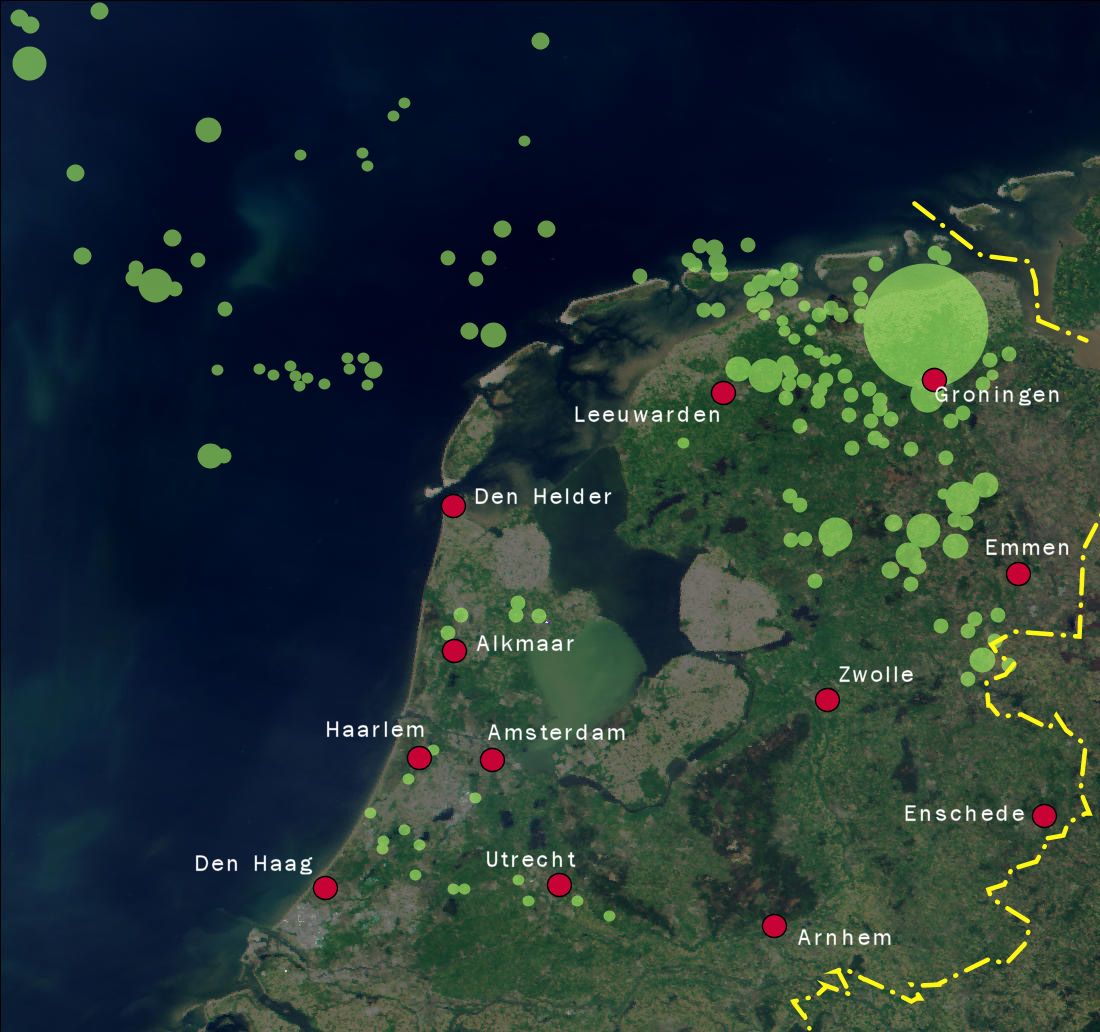
Methane fields in the Netherlands in 2008 with concession for NAM. At the top right is the Groningen gas field. The rest are considered small fields.

Until 1959, it had been assumed that the North Sea had no methane and oil. This opinion changed after the discovery of the Groningen gas field. In the decade after the discovery they successfully searched for fields in the North Sea.

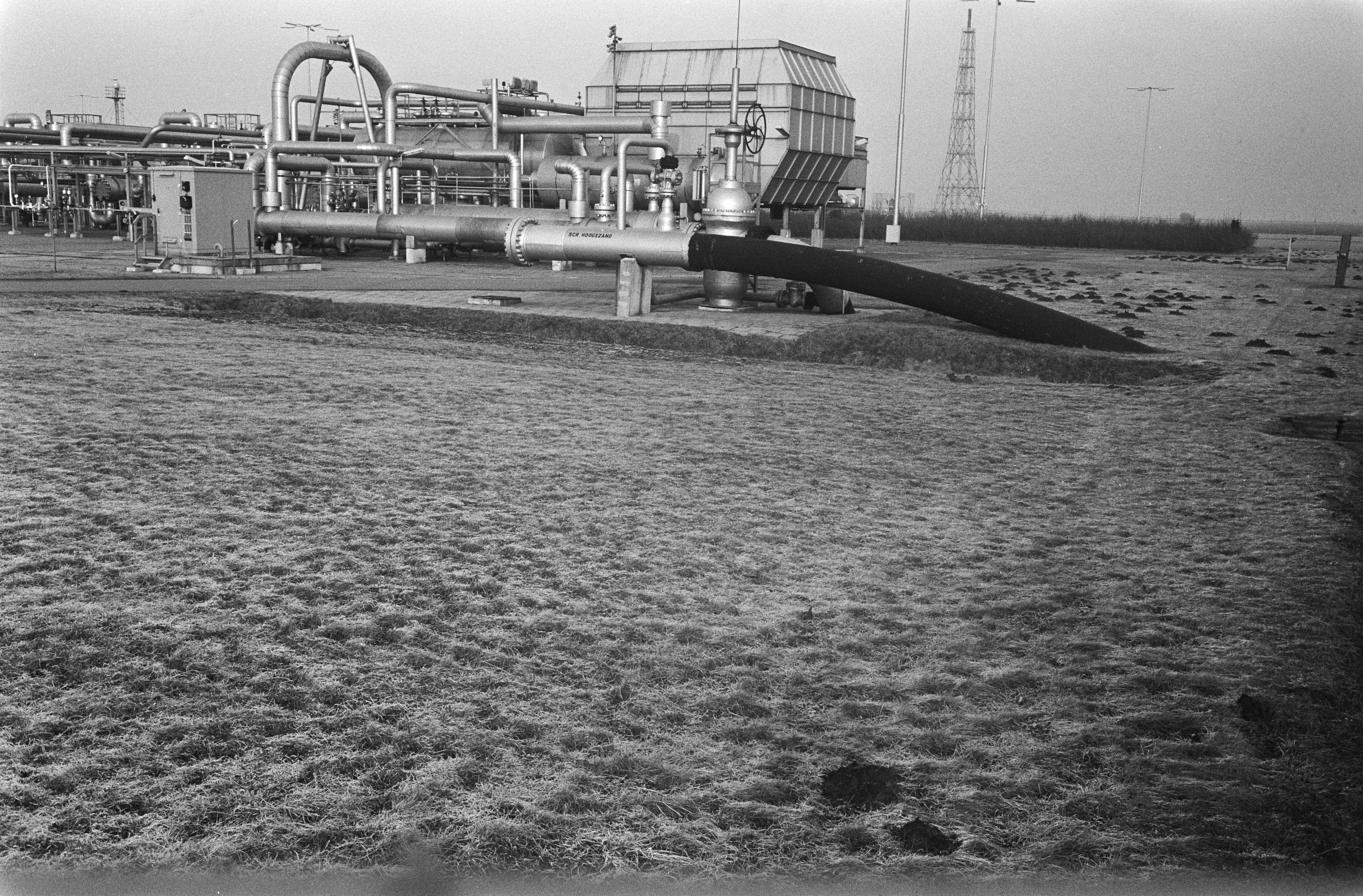
Natural gas extraction at Slochteren, 1982

Initially it was expected that nuclear energy would eventually replace the use of methane. Efforts were made to sell methane as quickly as possible, both at home and abroad. In the mid-1970s, this policy was revised after the oil crisis of 1973 and the great social resistance to the deployment of nuclear energy. That is why the desire arose to keep the Groningen gas field as a reserve. Therefore, the small fields policy was introduced in 1974. The aim of this policy was to extract more methane from smaller fields, including in the North Sea, to limit the production in the Groningen gas field. Because small fields entailed higher operating costs, the Dutch government reduced its profit share to make exploitation more attractive.

=== Earthquakes ===
The first earthquake induced by a Dutch methane field occurred in 1986 near Assen, induced by the Eleveld gas field. Local politician Meent van der Sluis argued that there was a connection between gas extraction in the Groningen field and the earthquake. On 4 December 1991, the first induced earthquake of the Groningen field was measured, with a magnitude of 2.4 on the Richter scale. In 1993, after research, NAM recognized a link between earthquakes and gas extraction. In the following decades, the number of induced earthquakes increased. Along with the earthquakes, resistance against gas extraction also increased. For example, the Groninger Bodem Beweging was founded in 2009 in response to the Earthquake near Middelstum in 2006.

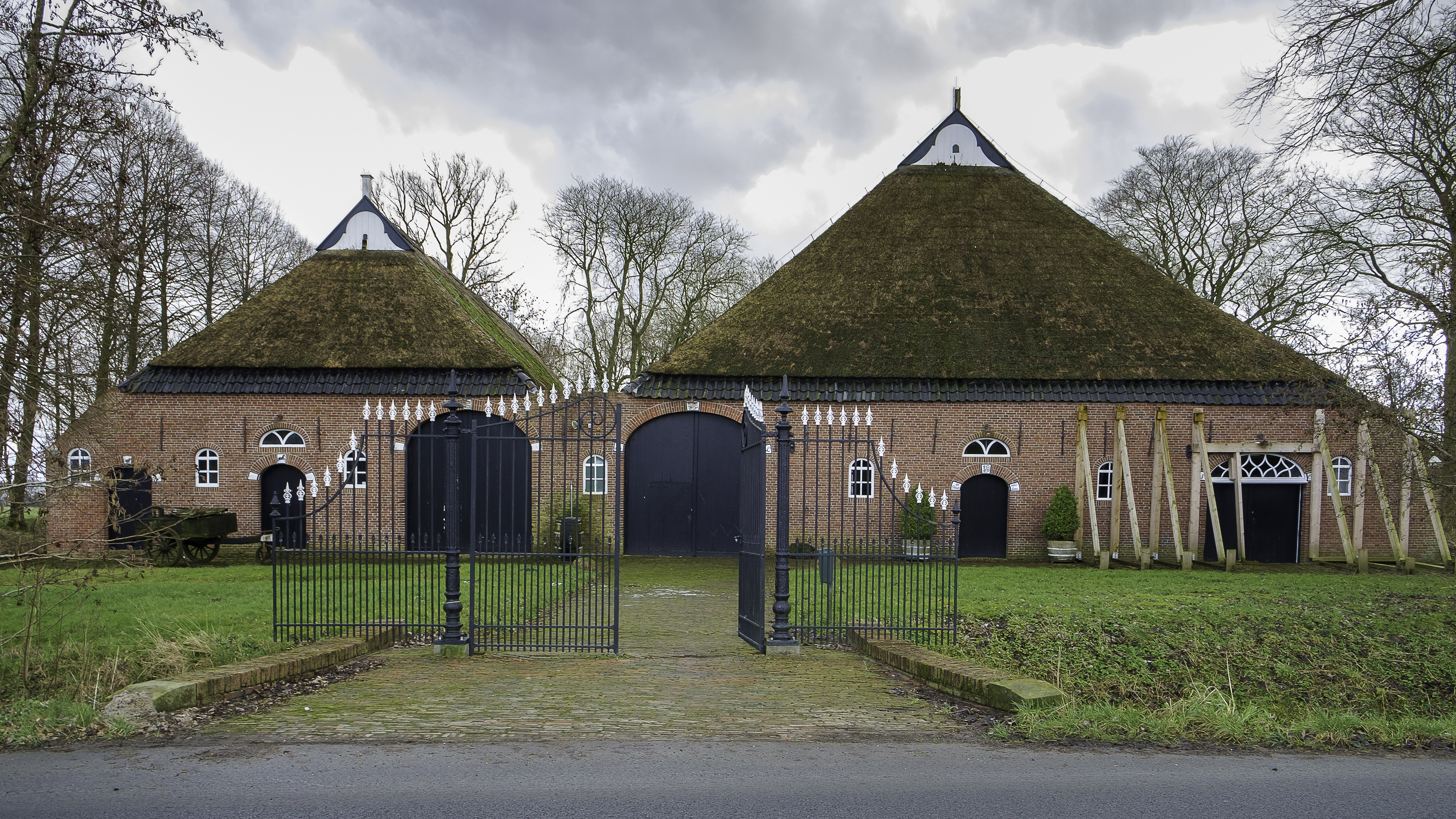
Farm Melkema, where the front wall on the right is propped because of the danger of collapse after earthquakes. The NAM bought the farm in 2017 and gave it to Het Groninger Landschap.

According to a 2015 report by the Dutch Safety Board, until 2013, "the safety of the citizens of Groningen in relation to induced earthquakes had not influenced decision-making about the exploitation of the Groningen field." A tipping point was the Huizinge Earthquake on 16 August 2012. With an estimated moment magnitude of 3.6, it was the largest earthquake measured above the Groningen gas field. After the earthquake, the Staatstoezicht op de Mijnen (SodM) concluded that the earthquakes in the area could become stronger in the future, between 4 and 5 on the Richter scale. SodM recommended limiting gas extraction quickly, and as much as possible.

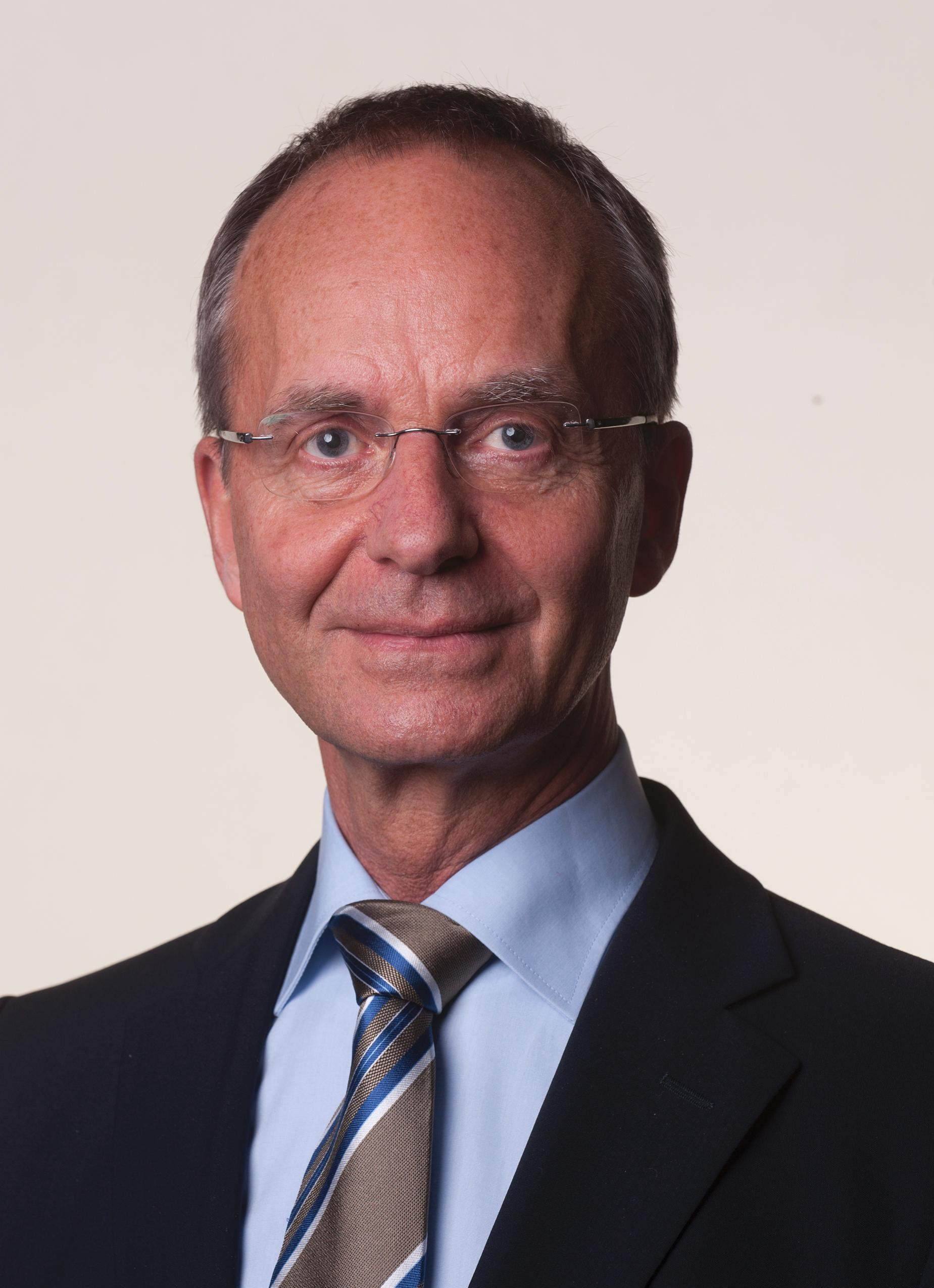
Minister of Economic Affairs Henk Kamp (2012-2017)

In January 2013, the Minister of Economic Affairs Henk Kamp decided not to limit gas extraction immediately, but requested fourteen investigations. The report also coincided with austerity measures, which made the government reluctant to reduce methane revenues. At the end of the year it was announced that about 10% more gas, 54 billion cubic meters, had been extracted than previous years, according to the NAM because of the cold.

=== Phasing out gas production ===
In 2014, gas production from the Groningen gas field was limited due to earthquakes for the first time. In January 2014, Kamp announced that it would limit production to 42.5 billion m^{3} in 2014. At the beginning of 2015, the Dutch cabinet decided that a maximum of 39.4 billion m^{3} of gas could be produced from the gas field in that calendar year, which was further reduced to 30 billion m^{3} in June 2015. In November 2015, the Council of State lowered the limit to 27 billion m^{3}. A month later, Kamp decided to maintain this maximum. In September 2016 it was subsequently decided to further limit gas extraction to 21.6 billion m^{3}. A year later, the Council of State concluded that this decision was insufficiently motivated and that it had to be renewed.

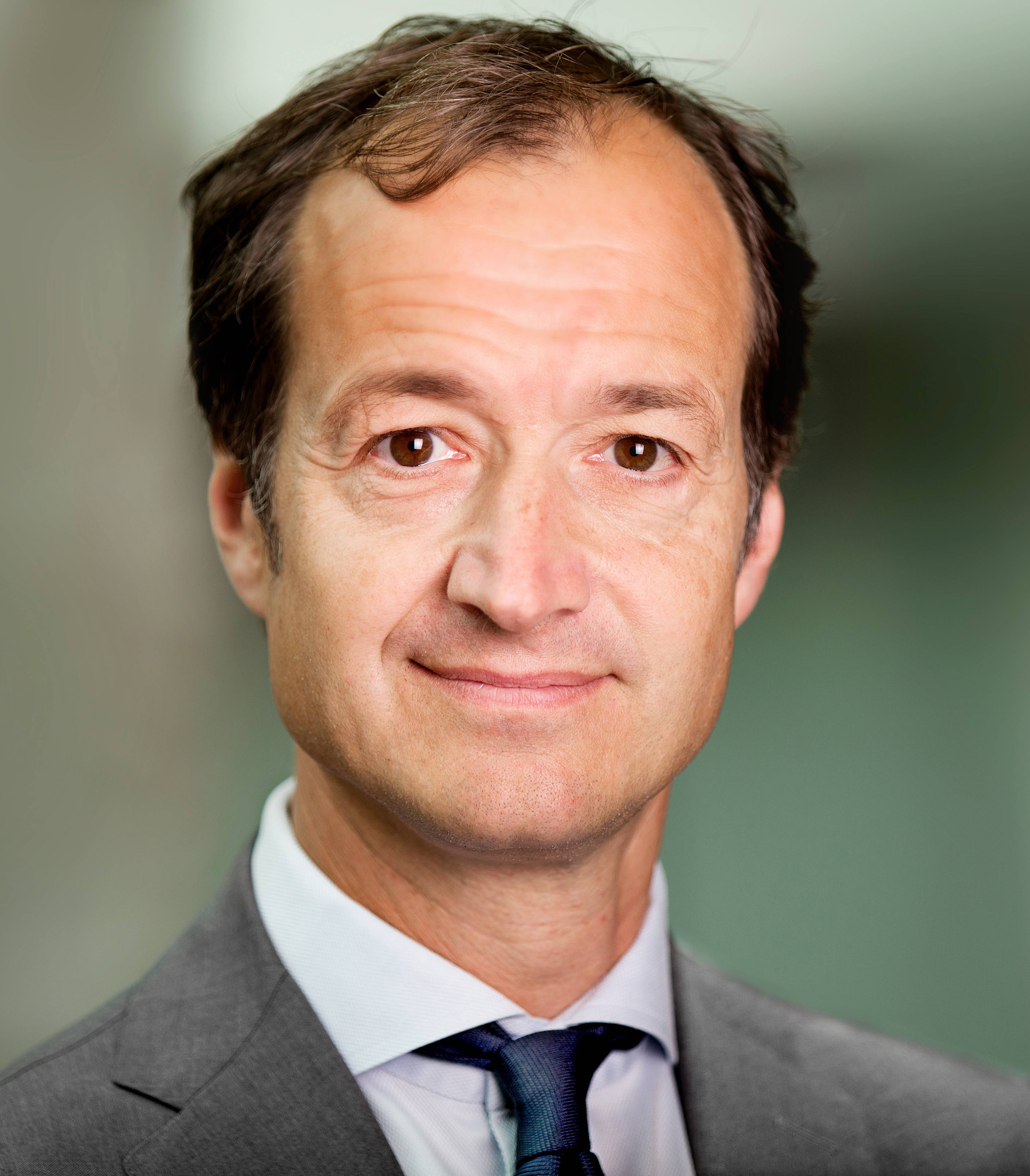
Minister of Economic Affairs and Climate Eric Wiebes (2017-2021)

In October 2017, Eric Wiebes became the new Minister of Economic Affairs and Climate. Three months into his term, Wiebes had to deal with the Zerijp Earthquake. It was the third strongest in magnitude, but was perceived as stronger due to higher ground acceleration. In March 2018, Wiebes announced that gas extraction in the Groningen field had to be reduced to zero by 2030 at the latest. The extraction plan was again rejected by the Council of State in July 2019. Wiebes then announced an accelerated phasing out, whereby gas extraction would be stopped by 2022 during normal winters. Not much later, however, this turned out to be too optimistic. As of 2021, the expectation was that the Groningen field would be closed between 2025 and 2028; this timeline was accelerated in 2023, with a target closure date of 1 October 2023.

=== Claims handling, reinforcement and compensation ===
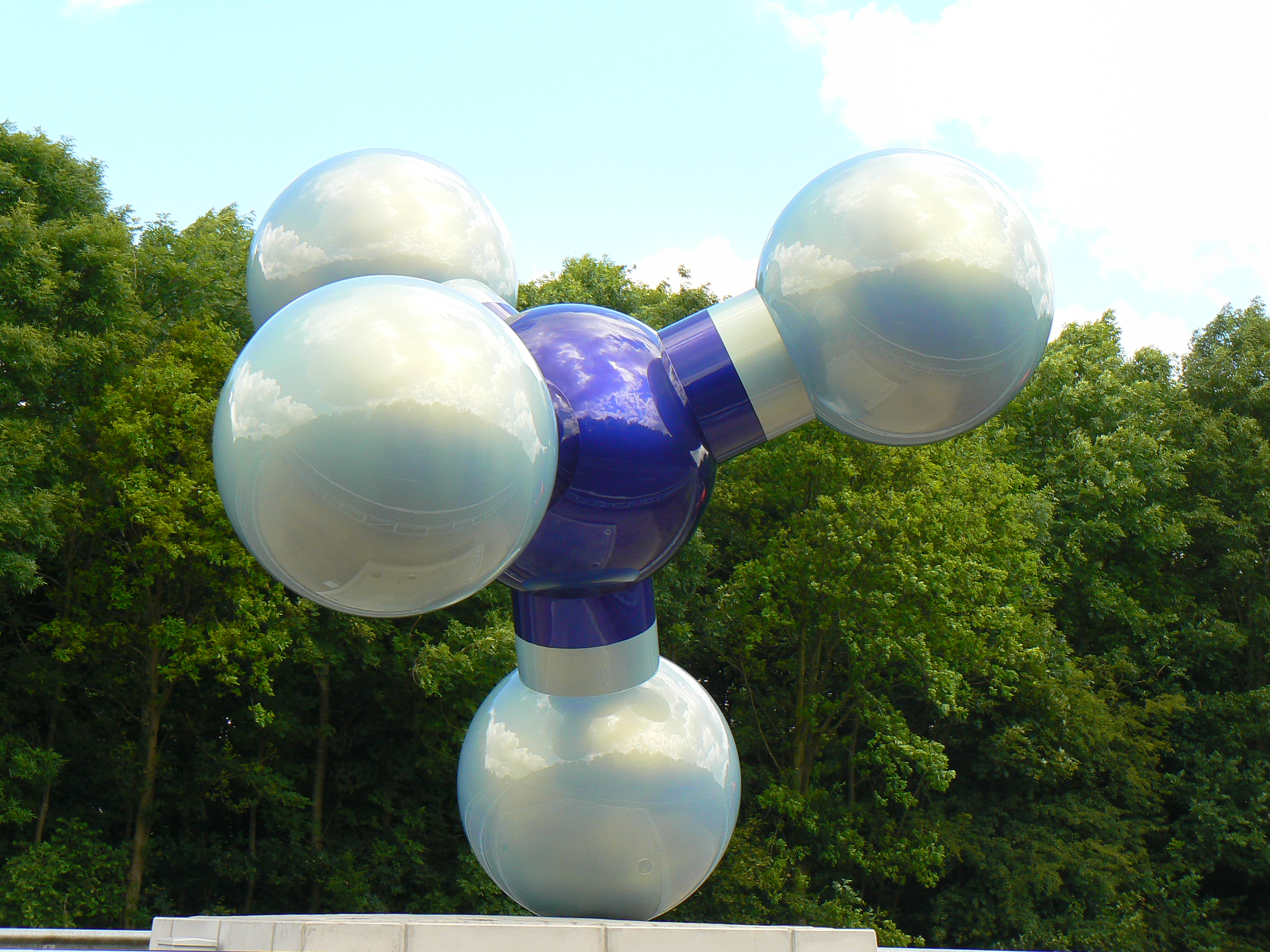
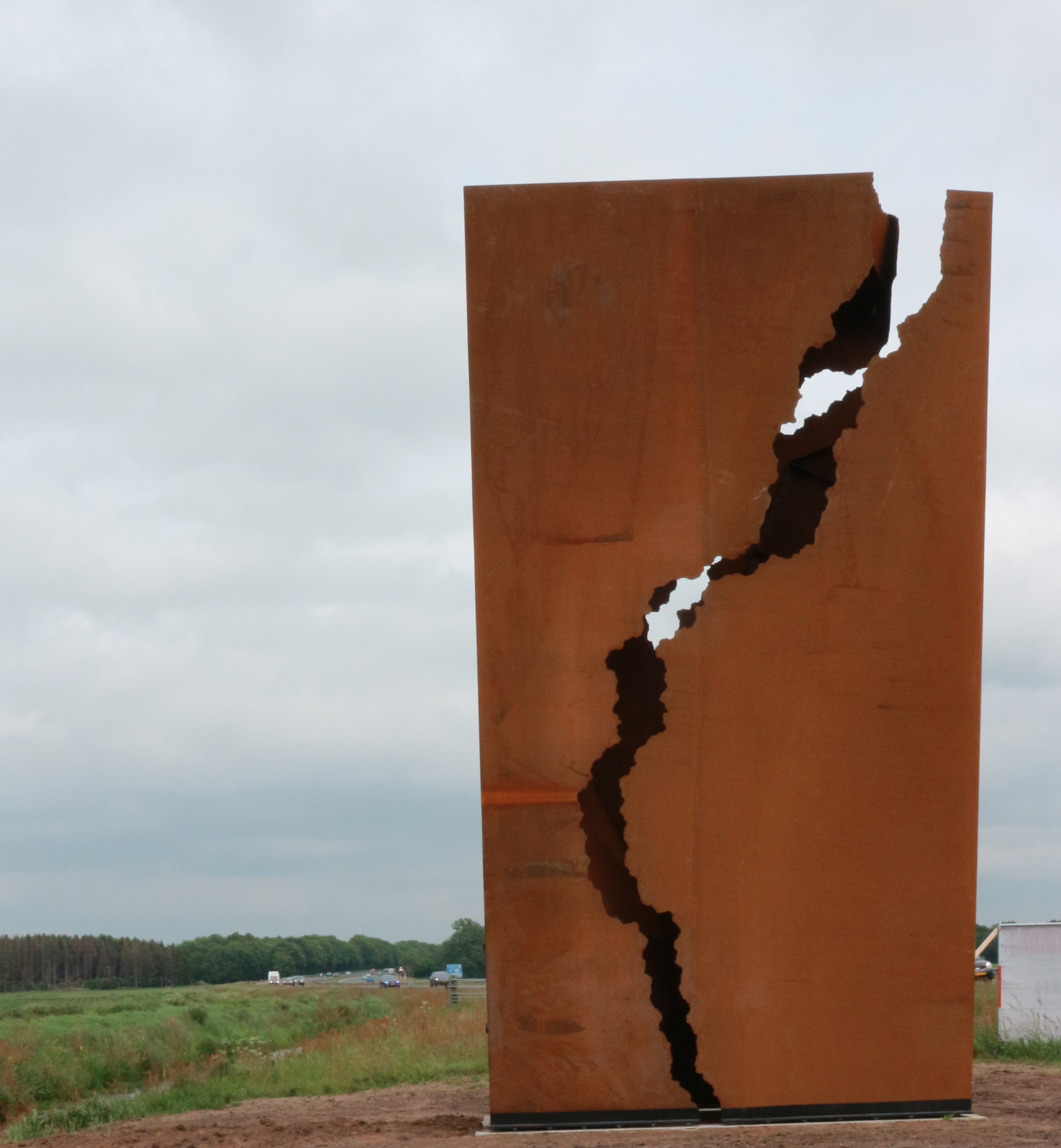
In 2009, for the 50th anniversary of the Groningen field, the sculpture Gasmolecule by Marc Ruygrok was unveiled in Kolham at A7. Ten years later, "Het Andere Monument" was unveiled, a few kilometers from the Gas molecule along the A7. This monument, also known as the Earthquake Monument, was commissioned by the Stichting Meent van der Sluis to draw attention to the earthquake problem in Groningen.

In addition to phasing out gas extraction, various measures were taken. Three times between 2014 and 2020, more than a billion euros were pledged for reinforcement, handling claims and compensation. The Centrum Veilig Wonen was established in 2014 to further distance the claims handling process from NAM. And as the central point of contact, Hans Alders was appointed in 2015 as National Coordinator Groningen. Despite these measures, claims handling and reinforcement are progressing slowly. In 2020, the SodM calculated that the reinforcement operation will take another 20 years, but the Inspector General of the SodM demanded that these should be completed by 2028. In October 2021, National Ombudsman Reinier van Zutphen called the issue a "national crisis". The gas extraction of the Groningen gas field and the problems it has caused is as of 2021 subject of the parliamentary inquiry into methane extraction Groningen.

=== Investor-state dispute settlement claim ===
In late‑2025, Shell launched an arbitration claim against the Netherlands government under the provisions of the Energy Charter Treaty for potentially billions of euros in compensation in respect of the mandated closure of the gas field. The case will be heard behind closed doors.

=== Research ===
In 2018, a research programme by the Dutch Research Council, called DeepNL, was initiated to look into the long term consequences of the winning of gas in the Groningen gas field. Specific research projects included subsidence, risk analysis, and earthquake forecasting. With the individual projects being planned for four to five years. Programme coordinator and geophysicist Rinus Wortel called it comparable with the Dutch efforts of protection from the sea.

== Geology ==
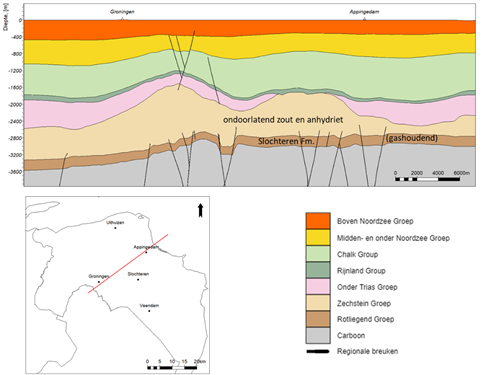
Cross section of the Groningen field (in Dutch)

The source rock of the Groningen gas field, the stratum from which the natural gas originated, is the upper part of the Carboniferous sequence. During the late Carboniferous period, the Netherlands was located on the equator and was covered by tropical swamp forests. The plant remains were buried by subsequent layers and eventually became coal, in particular in the Limburg Group. In South Limburg this layer was shallow enough for coal mines, but in Groningen it was 3.3 kilometres underground. methane was generated from the type-III kerogen in that coal-rich layer as it became heated by further burial.

This gas then rose to the overlying Upper Rotliegend from the early part of the Permian epoch. Within the Upper Rotliegend it lies specifically in the Slochteren Formation. This layer had a porosity of 15–20% and a permeability of 0.1–3000 mD. During the Permian period, the area consisted of desert, of which the sand came from the Variscan orogen. The best petroleum reservoirs are located in fine-grained aeolian dune sand. In the case of the Groningen gas field, there is a lot of gas in the coarser granular fluvial wadi sand. The reservoir is located between 2,600 and 3,200 meters underground. Above the Upper Rotliegend is the Zechstein layer, which forms the seal rock. This layer contains impermeable carbonate, halite and anhydrite layers, so that the gas remained trapped in the Upper Rotliegend.

The Groningen structure is a long-lived high, cut by many faults, most of which are normal in type. The faults were formed, and in many cases subsequently reactivated, during the phases of rifting and later inversion that have affected the area. There is evidence of some active faulting during the deposition of the Rotliegend regionally, although not at Groningen itself. The main rift phase occurred during the Late Jurassic to Early Cretaceous period. The dominant fault orientation is NNW–SSE trending, with some faults also running W–E and N–S. The area was affected by a number of phases of shortening associated with the Alpine orogeny during the Late Cretaceous to Paleogene, which locally reactivated normal faults in reverse sense. The faults have some impact on production in the field, although the constant gas composition and lack of pressure changes between fault blocks suggest that few of the faults are acting as barriers.

=== Properties of Groningen gas ===
Composition of Groningen gas
Component	Vol%
Methane	81.30
Ethane	2.85
Propane	0.37
Butane	0.14
Pentane	0.04
Hexane	0.05
Dinitrogen	14.35
Oxygen	0.01
Carbon dioxide	0.89

The gas from the Groningen gas field is characterized by a high percentage of dinitrogen in the composition. The high percentage of the non-combustible nitrogen ensures a low calorific value. When burned, the Groningen gas yields 35.17 megajoule per cubic meter (MJ/m^{3}). Due to the deviating calorific value and higher pressure, gas-consuming appliances had to be fitted with other burners after 1963 or replaced completely. Conversely, when gas production was being phased out, nitrogen had to be added to imported high-calorific gas. To this end, work has been underway since 2020 on a nitrogen plant in Zuidbroek.

=== Size ===
The gas field is spread out over approximately 900 square kilometers. Estimates of the size of the gas field have risen sharply since its discovery in 1959. After the drilling success in Delfzijl, the size of the gas field was estimated at 60 billion m^{3}. The search continued and the gas estimates were revised upwards; in the autumn of 1962 the estimate was 470 billion m^{3}; in October 1963 already 1110 billion m^{3} and in 1967 2000 billion m^{3}. In 2010, the recoverable gas stock was estimated at 2700 billion m^{3}. The recoverable gas stock depends on the technology and price of the gas, because at higher prices more reserves are economically recoverable. Estimates from 2023 put the reserves at approximately 450 billion m^{3}.

== Production ==
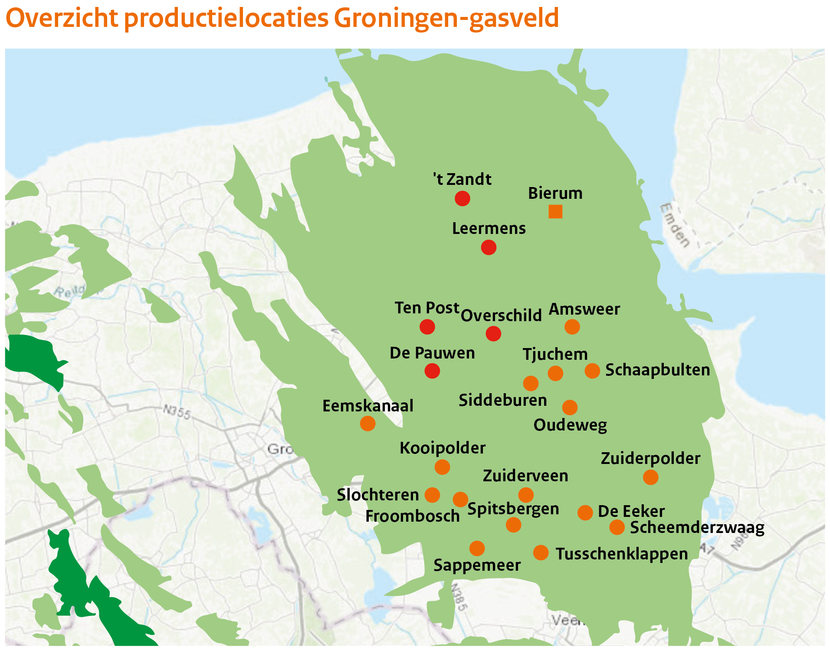
Map of production locations of the Groningen gas field

At its peak, the Groningen field had 29 extraction clusters. Spread over these clusters were approximately 300 gas wells. These are controlled from a control room in Sappemeer. The saline groundwater that emerges from the gas production is injected into an empty gas field in the original rock layer at Borgsweer. The natural gas condensate that is released is transported by inland shipping to refineries in Botlek.

After decades of production, the pressure in the Groningen field decreased. The Groningen Long Term Project (GLT) was started in 1997 to counteract the pressure drop. This project was completed in 2009. Compressors are installed that can bring the pressure of the field back to the desired level. The total investment amount was approximately two billion euros. During this renovation, the characteristic flare towers with pilot light disappeared at many locations.

Initially, gas extraction had a strong seasonal pattern. In winter, there was a high demand for gas for heating purposes, hence more was produced. From 2015 the goal has been to achieve equal production throughout the year. This was because the pressure decreased and less could be extracted per day, but also to limit earthquakes. For this purpose, methane is stored in underground gas storages in the summer. There are three gas storage facilities in the Netherlands: Bergermeer gas storage, Langelo/Norg and Grijpskerk.

Methane production in the Groningen gas field.

=== Methane Revenue ===
A large part of the revenue from the Groningen field ends up as natural gas revenue with the Dutch State. Initially, about 70% of the revenues from the Groningen field went to the Dutch state. Minister of Economic Affairs Ruud Lubbers raised this to 85-95% during his term of office (1973-1977). As of January 1, 2018, this was reduced to 73%, in line with other gas fields. The reason for this was that gas extraction decreased, but the costs of the NAM for compensation and reinforcement increased. With the exception of a few years, the Ministry of Economic Affairs has not tracked how much of the methane revenues came from the Groningen field. In the period 2006-2013, methane revenues amounted to 69 billion euros from the Groningen field and 29 billion euros from the small fields. Total methane revenues, including the small fields, amounted to 417 billion euros until 2018. (Note: Converted to price level 2018.)

Unlike other countries, the Minister of Finance Jelle Zijlstra chose not to establish a separate fund for methane revenues. The income in the regular budget made it possible to expand the Dutch welfare state. According to The Economist, this led to the so-called Dutch disease. The newspaper stated that methane revenues strengthened the currency too much, making it harder for other industries to compete internationally. As a result, unemployment had risen from 1.1% in 1970 to 5.1% in 1978, when The Economist published about the phenomenon. Later separate funds were created, such as the Fonds Economische Structuurversterking between 1995 and 2011. To Groningen's dissatisfaction, the Institute for Research on Public Expenditure concluded in 2006 that only 1% of that fund was returned to the northern provinces Groningen, Drenthe and Friesland.

== Land subsidence and earthquakes ==
Number of earthquakes induced by the Groningen gas field according to the KNMI, updated until 31 October 2021.

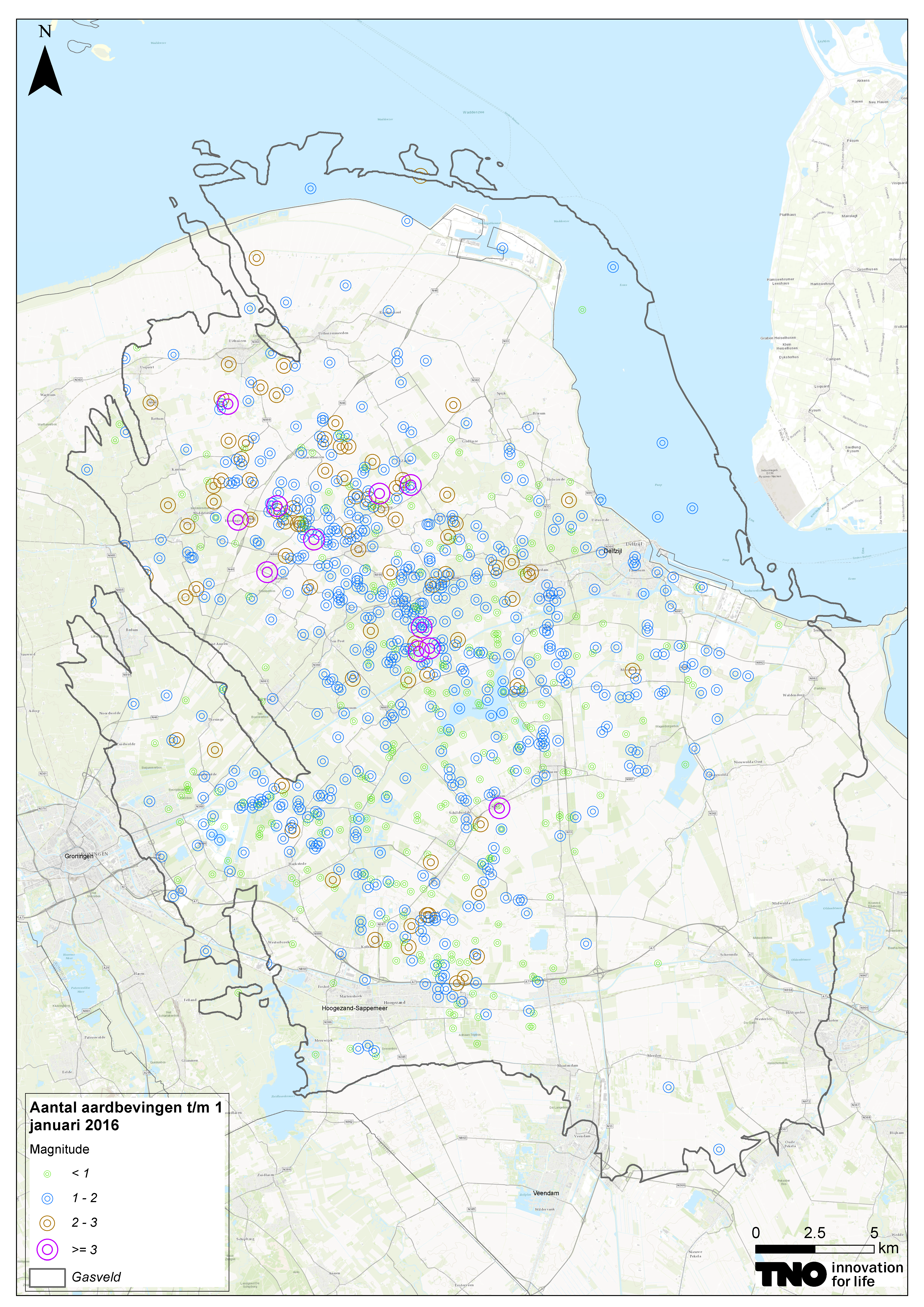
Map of earthquakes above the Groningen gas field until January 2016.

The gas extraction contributes to subsidence above the field. This drop is caused by a drop in pressure in the sandstone where the gas is stored. At its deepest point, the subsidence in 2018 had fallen 37 centimeters compared to 1963, according to the 'Commission on Subsidence'. In 2020, the Commission assumed that this would increase to a 46 centimeter drop in 2080.

It is controversial to what extent this subsidence in itself contributed to building damage above and around the Groningen field. Research commissioned by the Instituut Mijnbouwschade Groningen (IMG) conducted by TNO and TU Delft concluded in 2021 that this was not the case. The subsidence does cause changes in the groundwater level. Damage to waterworks and damage to farmers due to the changing groundwater level was compensated by NAM from the start. The IMG is still investigating whether the changing groundwater level can lead to damage to houses.

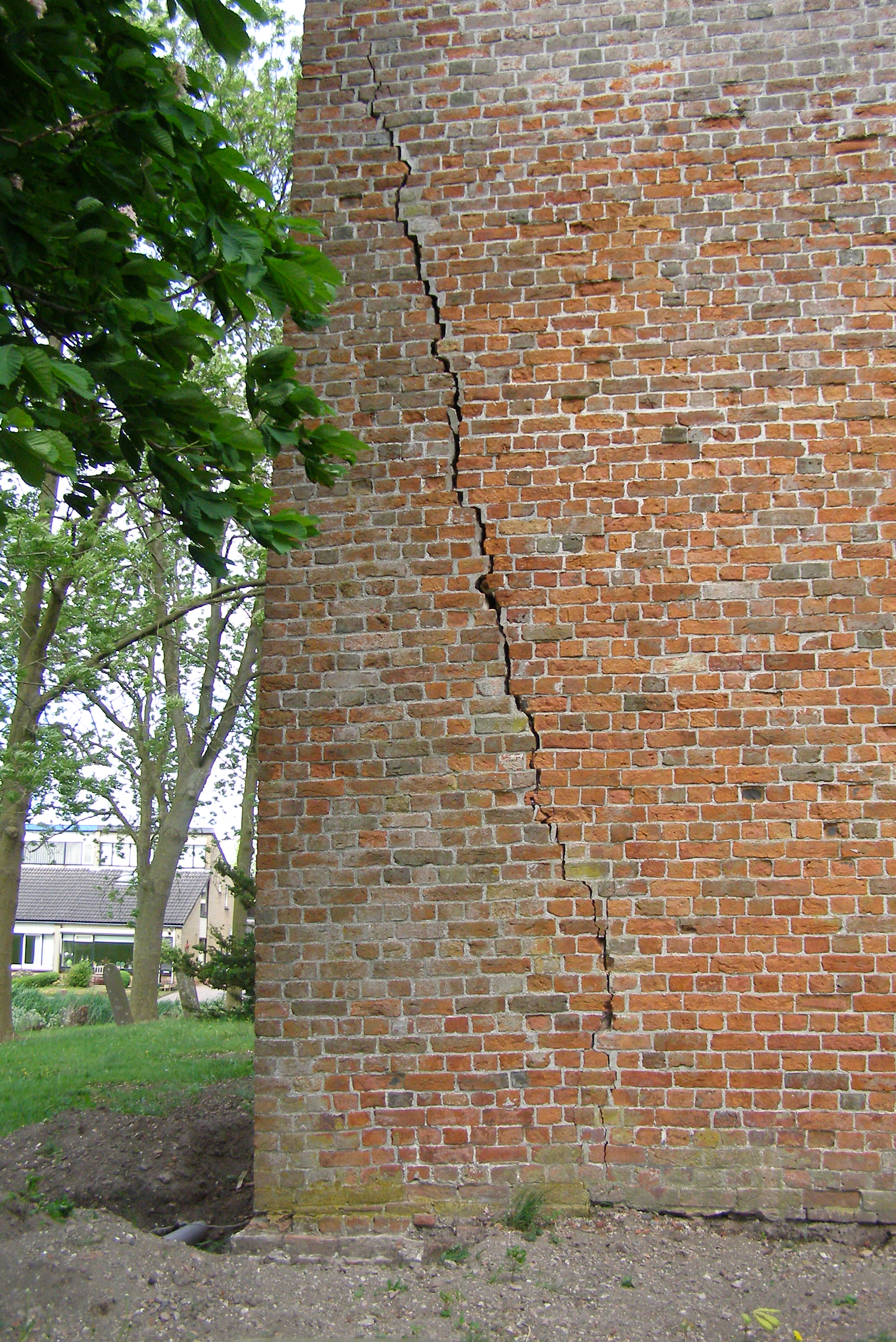
Crack in the wall of Woldendorp church due to induced earthquakes, 2011

Since 1991, the subsidence has also been accompanied by earthquakes above the field. Until 2021, the biggest earthquake, near Huizinge in 2012, had a magnitude of 3.6. These earthquakes caused extensive damage to buildings above the field. Even with the phasing out of gas production, the earthquakes are expected to continue for a while. In 2013, the NAM CEO also said that it was possible that earthquakes would become heavier, increasing to a magnitude of 5 on the Richter scale. A reinforcement operation was launched to have houses meet the Meijdam standard, whereby the chance of dying per year from an earthquake must be less than 1 in 100,000. (Note: The probability used is also used in the rest of the Netherlands for, among other things, floodings) 26,000 are made more earthquake-resistant for that reason. (Note: By reducing and eventually stopping gas extraction, less than the original 26,000 do not meet the Meijdam standard. Because reinforcements had been promised to these residents, it was decided in 2020 to strengthen these houses if the residents so wished.)

The earthquakes also have non-material consequences. The earthquakes, for example, cause stress among residents by increasing stress to human living conditions, which, according to researchers at the University of Groningen, leads to health problems and even death. The value of homes above and around the Groningen field also fell.

== Sources ==
- Boersema, Wendelmoet (2021a). Gronings goud (in Dutch). Ambo/Anthos uitgevers. ISBN 9789026344657.
- Brandsma, Margriet; Ekker, Heleen; Start, Reinalda (2016). De gaskolonie (in Dutch). Passage. ISBN 9789054523215.
- Damveld, Herman (2020). Gaswinning Groningen (in Dutch). Uitgeverij Profiel. ISBN 9789052944326.
- Hakkenes, Emiel (2020-10-15). Gas (in Dutch). Uitgeverij Thomas Rap. ISBN 9789400407084.
