= Francis Field =

Francis Field may refer to:

- Francis Field (Illinois), located at Greenville College
- Francis Olympic Field, located at Washington University in St. Louis
- Francis J. Field (1895–1992), philatelist and stamp dealer

== See also ==
- Frank Field (disambiguation)
