= Franklin Field (disambiguation) =

Franklin Field is a stadium at the University of Pennsylvania.

Franklin Field may also refer to:

== Airports ==
- Franklin Field (Alabama) (FAA: 07A), an airport in Union Springs, Alabama, United States
- Franklin Field (California) (FAA: F72), an airport in Franklin, California, United States
- Franklin Flying Field (FAA: 3FK), an airport in Franklin, Indiana, United States

== Parks ==
- Franklin Field (Massachusetts), the former name of Harambee Park in Boston
- Franklin Field (Wisconsin), a ballpark in Franklin, Wisconsin, United States

== Other uses ==
- Elgin–Franklin fields, a complex of oil and gas fields in the North Sea

== See also ==
- Frank Field (disambiguation)
- Franklin County Airport (disambiguation)
