= Elgin–Franklin fields =

Fossil fuel deposit in the North Sea

Elgin–Franklin field
- Location within North Sea
- Country: Scotland, United Kingdom
- Location: North Sea
- Block: 22/30b 22/30c 29/5b
- Offshore/onshore: Offshore
- Coordinates: 57°10′N 2°00′E
- Operator: Total S.A.
- Partners: Total S.A. Eni; BG Group; Premier Oil; ExxonMobil; Chevron Corporation; Dyas; Oranje-Nassau Energie

Field history
- Discovery: 1985 (Franklin); 1991 (Elgin)
- Start of production: March 2001 (Elgin); August 2001 (Franklin)

Production
- Current production of oil: 45,000 barrels per day (~2.2×10^{6} t/a)
- Recoverable oil: 365 million barrels (~4.98×10^{7} t)
- Estimated gas in place: 1,710×10^{9} cu ft (48×10^{9} m^{3})
- Producing formations: Upper Jurassic Fulmar Formation (Franklin Sand)

The Elgin–Franklin fields are two adjacent gas condensate fields located in the Central Graben Area of the North Sea 240 kilometres (130 nmi) east of Aberdeen, Scotland at a water depth of 93 metres (305 ft). The joint development of the Elgin and Franklin fields is the largest high pressure high temperature development in the world, and also contains the world's hottest, highest temperature field, West Franklin, and the Glenelg field.

On 25 March 2012, a gas leak occurred at the Elgin platform resulting in a shut down of production and evacuation of personnel. The leak continued for over seven weeks, and was stopped after well intervention work on 16 May 2012. Production from the fields restarted almost a year later, on 9 March 2013.

== History ==
The Franklin field was discovered by well 29/5b-4, drilled by Ultramar in 1985, and appraised by wells 29/5b-6z in 1989/1990 and 29/5b-8 in 1991. The field was named after British Explorer Sir John Franklin, and first production was in August 2001.

The Elgin field was discovered by well 22/30c-8 in 1991 and appraised by wells 22/30c-10 in 1992/1993 and 22/30c-13 in 1994, drilled by Elf Aquitaine. The field was named after the Scottish town of Elgin. It is also named as a tribute to a geologist named Nigel who was instrumental in the field's discovery, Elgin is an anagram of Nigel. Production from the Elgin field began in March 2001.

The Glenelg satellite field was discovered in 1999 by well 29/4d-4, drilled by Total. It is named after the Scottish town of Glenelg, Highland. It was developed by a step-out well drilled from the Elgin platform and first production was in March 2006.

The West Franklin reservoir was discovered by Total in 2003. It was developed by a deviated well from the Franklin platform. First production was achieved in March 2007 with the second well coming on stream in September 2008. A new wellhead platform was installed on West Franklin in 2014 with three wells being drilled as of 2016. Production from the first well (29/5b-H1Z) started in 2015. A second wellhead platform Elgin B has also been installed at Elgin and is bridge linked to the Elgin A platform and PUQ to enable extra infill production wells to be drilled.

=== March 2012 gas leak ===
On 25 March 2012 a gas leak occurred at the Elgin Well head platform within well 22/30c-G4 during operations to plug and decommission the well. No injuries were reported and 219 non-essential personnel were evacuated from the PUQ and the adjacent Rowan Viking jack up drilling rig, which was performing the decommissioning work. The remaining 19 personnel were evacuated later on the same day.

At the time of the incident the fields were producing 120,000 barrels per day (19,000 m^{3}/d) of oil equivalent, about 7% of the UK's gas production. Methane gas was released into the environment as was between two and 23 tonnes of condensate which formed a sheen on the sea surface measuring approximately 6 nautical miles (11 km; 6.9 mi) in length. The HM Coastguard declared a 2 nautical miles (3.7 km; 2.3 mi) exclusion zone for ships and a 3 miles (4.8 km) exclusion zone for aircraft. Shell E&P also evacuated non essential staff from the separate Shearwater platform located in block 22/30b 6 km (3.2 nmi) from Elgin. At its peak, 200,000 cubic metres per day (7,100,000 cu ft/d) of gas was being released, which slowed when a relief well was drilled. The platform flare was alight till 31 March 2012 representing a potential risk of ignition for the leaking gas if wind direction should change. Total announced the flare spontaneously shut down on Saturday 31 March 2012 after exhaustion of the volatile residues within the PUQ processing facilities which it was burning. The leak was stopped following well intervention work on 16 May 2012, which involved pumping mud and cement into the well.

The cause of the incident was identified as corrosion in the casing of the G4 well, and a sudden release of gas from the Hod formation above the producing reservoir. Total identified the origin of the gas leak to be an unexploited chalk reservoir layer of the Hod formation located at a depth of 4,500 metres (14,800 ft), above the main reservoir, which was supported by analysis showing the absence of significant concentration of hydrogen sulfide in the gas. The Hod formation had been isolated by steel casing during drilling in 1997.

On 25 February 2012, an increase in pressure was observed in the C annulus within the well and remedial operations started on 4 March 2012. Total believe that the C annulus failed and gas was observed leaking from the 30-inch (760 mm) conductor.

An inspection team comprising eight people from Total and Wild Well Control, a specialist well control company, boarded the Elgin platform on 5 April 2012 to gather information about the state of the platform. The team left safely after four hours.

During April 2012 a diverter assembly was installed around the G4 well head to divert the leaking gas (estimated then at 200,000 cubic metres per day (7,100,000 cu ft/d)) away from the platform in a controlled manner enabling well control operations to begin. In May 2012 two drilling rigs were working on repairing the leak. The West Phoenix semi submersible rig was working on the "top kill" operation. This involved pumping weighted drilling mud into the well via the wellhead assembly, a method which was ultimately successful in halting the leak. A relief well, G4-K1 was drilled to "bottom kill" the well by the Sedco 714.

Eleven monitoring overflights of the area by surveillance aircraft from Oil Spill Response Limited were made in early May, and the flow rate from the well was estimated at that time to be 50,000 cubic metres per day (1,800,000 cu ft/d).

On 16 May, Total announced that the leak had been stopped.

Production restarted on 9 March 2013.

=== December 2016 Helicopter Incident ===
On 28 December 2016 a Sikorsky S-92 helicopter (registration G-WNSR, serial number 920250) operated by CHC Helicopter experienced "unexpected control responses" whilst in mid-air on a routine shuttle flight between two oil installations in the North Sea. The pilots conducted an emergency landing on the West Franklin platform. The helicopter is reported to have spun on the helideck during the landing, damaging the helicopter wheels and rotor blades. The helideck also sustained damage during the emergency landing. There were no reported injuries amongst the nine passengers and two crew during the incident. The aircraft was transported back to Aberdeen via ship, at which time the Air Accidents Investigation Branch began their investigation into the incident.

Sikorsky issued a notice on 9 January 2017 grounding all S-92 aircraft until the tail rotors have been inspected. The inspection work takes approximately 11 man hours to complete. The Air Accidents Investigation Branch issued an update on 11 January 2017 which reported that the tail rotor pitch change shaft bearing had seized. The bearing showed signs of severe overheating and significant wear. The failure of the bearing allowed the tail rotor driveshaft to damage the tail rotor servo. The damage to the tail rotor servo is considered to be the cause of tail rotor control. The health and usage monitoring systems had discovered the flaw the day before flight, but the maintenance crew had not.

== Ownership ==
The fields are operated by Total E&P UK Limited, a subsidiary of Total S.A.(formerly Elf Aquitaine).

=== Elgin-Franklin and West Franklin ===
Equity in Elgin and Franklin was fixed by a unitisation agreement between three partner groups, and is shown in the table below. West Franklin is owned by the same partnership.

Company	Equity	Note
Total E&P UK Ltd.	46.137%	Operator (formerly Elf)
Eni Elgin/Franklin Ltd.	21.867%	
Harbour Energy Ltd.	14.110 %	formerly Chrysaor Ltd.
Harbour Energy Ltd.	5.200%	formerly Premier Oil UK Ltd.
Esso E&P UK Ltd.	4.375%	
Chevron North Sea Ltd.	3.900%	formerly Texaco
One-Dyas E&P Ltd.	2.1875%	
Summit E&P Ltd.	2.1875 %	

=== Glenelg ===
The partners in the Glenelg field are shown below.

Company	Equity	Note
Total E&P UK Ltd.	58.73%	Operator (formerly Elf)
Harbour Energy Ltd.	18.57 %	formerly Premier Oil UK Ltd.
Harbour Energy Ltd.	14.70%	formerly Chrysaor Ltd
Eni Elgin/Franklin Ltd.	8.00%	

== Geology ==
=== Franklin field ===
The Franklin field is a tilted fault block with little internal faulting. The main reservoir is the Upper Jurassic (Oxfordian Age) Fulmar Sandstone which has porosities in excess of 20%. The Middle Jurassic Pentland formation forms a second reservoir with a separate hydrocarbon pool. The reservoir is at 5,500 metres (18,000 ft) depth. It is at pressures of 14,000 psi (97,000 kPa) and temperatures of 190 °C (374 °F). Originally the recoverable reserves for Franklin were estimated at 820 billion cubic feet (23 billion cubic metres) of natural gas and 120 million barrels (19×10^{6} m^{3}) of condensate.

=== Elgin field ===
The Elgin structure is a fault bounded high on top of a collapsed Triassic mud "pod". It is heavily faulted and split into several separate fault panels with discrete gas water contacts. The reservoir is the same Fulmar sandstone as Franklin. The Pentland reservoir at Elgin is of poorer quality than that underneath Franklin and has not been developed. The original estimate of recoverable reserves for Elgin was 890 billion cubic feet (25 billion cubic metres) of gas and 245 million barrels (39.0×10^{6} m^{3}) of condensate.

=== West Franklin ===
The West Franklin structure has a Fulmar formation reservoir.

=== Glenelg ===
The Glenelg field is a tilted fault block with a Fulmar formation reservoir.

== Development ==
The Elgin-Franklin development is located in the Central Graben Area of the North Sea 240 kilometres (130 nmi) east of Aberdeen, Scotland at a water depth of 93 metres (305 ft). The installation consists of three separate platforms, two of which are connected by a 90 m (300 ft) bridge: two wellhead platforms which house the wells, one each for the Elgin and Franklin reservoirs, and the process, utilities and quarters (PUQ) platform, which is the central processing platform.

The PUQ is a pile mounted jack up design which contains hydrocarbon processing facilities, control systems and accommodation for the crew of 97. The structure was built by BARMAC in Nigg, Scotland, and installed in July 2000. The facility has a processing capacity of 516 million cubic feet per day (14.6×10^{6} m^{3}/d) of gas and 175 thousand barrels per day (27.8×10^{3} m^{3}/d) of condensate.

The Franklin wellhead platform (WHP) has nine well slots (seven wells on the Franklin Field and two extended reach wells on West Franklin) . It is not normally manned but has a helideck and shelter for up to 20 people. The Elgin wellhead platform has 12 well slots (11 wells on Elgin and one extended reach well on Glenelg). The platforms are linked to the PUQ by flowlines and were installed in 1999. The WHP has no installed drilling facilities (derrick, etc.). Well drilling and workover services are provided when needed by a jack up rig which operates in tender mode.

The west Franklin and Elgin B platforms were installed in 2014 in order to enable drilling of further development wells in the fields due to constraints in the existing facilities. In 2017 there were three wells on West Franklin and three wells on Elgin B)

The Produced oil is transported through the Forties pipeline system to BP's Kinneil terminal in Grangemouth while produced gas is transported through the SEAL Pipeline to Bacton, Norfolk.

== Reservoir characteristics ==
- high pressure / high temperature (HP/HT) wells
- well depth: 5,500 m (3.4 mi)
- pressure range: 600 – 1100 bar
- operational pressure: 860 bar
- fluid temperature: 193 °C (379 °F)
- sea floor depth: 93 m (305 ft)

The West Franklin reservoir is the world's hottest, highest pressure reservoir, with a temperature of 197 °C (387 °F) and pressure of 1,155 bars (115,500 kPa).

== See also ==
- Energy in the United Kingdom
- Piper Alpha (1988)
- Deepwater Horizon oil spill (2010)
- Sour gas
