= Franklin County Airport =

Franklin County Airport may refer to:

- Franklin County Airport (Georgia) in Canon, Georgia, United States (FAA: 18A)
- Franklin County Airport (North Carolina) in Louisburg, North Carolina, United States (FAA: LHZ, IATA: LFN)
- Franklin County Airport (Tennessee) in Sewanee, Tennessee, United States (FAA/IATA: UOS)
- Franklin County Airport (Texas) in Mount Vernon, Texas, United States (FAA: F53)
- Franklin County Regional Airport in Chambersburg, Pennsylvania, United States (FAA: N68)
- Franklin County State Airport in Highgate, Vermont, United States (FAA: FSO)

== See also ==
- Franklin Field (disambiguation)
