= Bergermeer gas storage =

The Bergermeer gas storage is an underground natural gas storage in the Alkmaar region north of Amsterdam in the Netherlands. It started operations in 2014. It is one of the largest gas storages in Europe.

== Technical features ==
The gas storage uses a depleted gas reservoir. The working volume of the gas storage will be 4.1 billion cubic meters (bcm) and a volume of cushion gas would be 4.6 bcm. The gas storage will include 14 new wells to a depth of 3 kilometres (1.9 mi), 35 kilometres (22 mi) of pipeline and the gas treatment facility. The gas treatment and compression facilities are being designed as a zero-emissions plant. The project is expected to cost €800 million excluding the cost of cushion gas. In August 2009, Gazprom Export—the export unit of Gazprom—was contracted to supply the project's cushion gas in exchange for gas storage services and a participating interest in operations of the facility. The final investment decision was made in October 2009. Assuming all permits are obtained, construction will start in mid-2010 with drilling of the 14 new wells expected to start in 2011. Commercial operations will start due to resistance of local city councils in 2014 at the earliest.

== Project company ==
The Bergermeer project consortium consists of TAQA Energy B.V. (a subsidiary of the Abu Dhabi National Energy Company), Energie Beheer Nederland (EBN), Dyas B.V. and Suncor. The facility is operated by TAQA Energy with out of hours market operations services provided by the UK based company GMSL.

== Environmental constraints ==
A number of scientific reports however show that gas storage might bring about serious seismic hazard to the surrounding municipalities of Bergen, Heiloo and Schermer and the town of Alkmaar. The area has known a number of (man) induced earthquakes during the depletion of the field between 1994 and 2008, with subsequent higher magnitudes on the Richter scale. Scientists from a number of renowned scientific institutes such as KNMI, MIT and TNO are comfortable with an estimated maximum magnitude of 3.9 on the Richter scale, with a chance of occurrence of 2% over the concession period. Earthquakes with lower magnitude but still quite damaging are of a much higher likelihood.
