= Energie Beheer Nederland =

Energie Beheer Nederland B.V. (EBN) is a natural gas exploration, production, transportation and sale company owned by the Dutch Government. It has also an interest in the gas sales company GasTerra. EBN is involved in the development of the Bergermeer gas storage project. It also investigates the options for using empty reservoirs and existing infrastructure for the storage of carbon dioxide.
