= Dyas =

- Company type: Subsidiary
- Industry: Oil and gas
- Founded: 1963
- Headquarters: Utrecht, Netherlands
- Parent: SHV Holdings
- Website: www.dyas.nl

Dyas is an oil and gas company headquartered in Utrecht, the Netherlands. It is a wholly owned subsidiary of SHV Holdings. Dyas participates as a partner in oil and gas exploration, development and production joint ventures. It participates in production and exploration licenses in the Netherlands, in the United Kingdom and Colombia.

In 1963, Dyas was one of the first companies in the Netherlands to be involved in hydrocarbon exploration, through a collaborative venture with Amoco (now TAQA) and Gelsenbergen Kohl (now Suncor). In 1964 this group discovered a gas field in the Bergen Concession which was followed by successful exploration in the immediate vicinity. Dyas is a partner for the Bergermeer gas storage project.
