= Frank Field (cricketer, born 1908) =

English cricketer

Personal information
- Born: 29 February 1908; Worcestershire, England
- Died: 24 May 1981 (aged 73); Stourbridge, England
- Batting: Right-handed
- Bowling: Right-arm fast-medium

Domestic team information
- Years: Team
- 1928–1932: Worcestershire
- FC debut: 29 August 1928 Worcestershire v Nottinghamshire
- Last FC: 10 June 1932 MCC v Kent

Career statistics
Competition	First-class
Matches	3
Runs scored	26
Batting average	6.50
100s/50s	0/0
Top score	12
Balls bowled	258
Wickets	4
Bowling average	48.50
5 wickets in innings	0
10 wickets in match	0
Best bowling	4/60
Catches/stumpings	0/–
- Source: CricketArchive, 30 March 2008

Frank Field (29 February 1908 – 24 May 1981) was an English cricketer who played three first-class matches for Worcestershire and Marylebone Cricket Club (MCC) during the interwar period.

== Early life ==
Field was born in Langley, Worcestershire and died aged 73 in Stourbridge.

== Career ==
Field made his debut for Worcestershire against Nottinghamshire at Dudley at the end of August 1928. Worcestershire lost the match by an innings, though Field look 4–60 (his only first-class wickets) in the first innings, all lbw. Nearly three years later he played for Worcestershire against the same opponents at Worcester, but was ineffectual in returning 0–56 from 11 overs. Field's last appearance in first-class cricket came in June 1932, when he turned out for Marylebone Cricket Club (MCC) against Kent at Lord's: he made a pair and returned 0–78 from 18 overs.
