= Frank Field (footballer) =

Australian rules footballer

Personal information
- Full name: Thomas Franklin Field
- Born: 2 October 1879; Tarnagulla, Victoria
- Died: 1 March 1963 (aged 83); Heidelberg, Victoria
- Original team: Tarnagatta

Playing career^{1}
Years	Club	Games (Goals)
1901–02	Carlton	13 (1)
- ^{1} Playing statistics correct to the end of 1902.

Thomas Franklin Field (2 October 1879 – 1 March 1963) was an Australian rules footballer who played with Carlton in the Victorian Football League (VFL).
