= Francis J. Field =

British philatelist

Francis John Field (1895 - 1992) was a philatelist and stamp dealer who specialised in aero-philately and was entered on the Roll of Distinguished Philatelists in 1968.

His firm of Francis J. Field Limited specialised in air stamps and published many catalogues, books and journals on the subject.

== Publications ==
- A Commercial and Historical Atlas of the World's Airways, 1925.
- The Coronation Aerial Post 1911, 1934. (With N.C. Baldwin)
