= Brigyn =

Welsh folk music duo

Brigyn are a Welsh music act from North Wales, consisting of the brothers Eurig Roberts and Ynyr Roberts.

The brothers formed Brigyn in November 2004 with the release of their eponymous debut album. Released on the Gwynedd label Gwynfryn Cymunedol, the album received considerable airplay on Radio Cymru; one of the tracks, 'Sonar' was selected by BBC Radio 1 DJ Huw Stephens for inclusion on the Dan Y Cownter showcase CD released by the Welsh Music Foundation in 2005. Later that year, a second album, Brigyn2, was also released on the Gwynfryn Cymunedol label with the album launch party hosted inside a tree!

In 2006, Brigyn toured Wales extensively, playing the Sesiwn Fawr festival in Dolgellau in July and the Green Man Festival later in the summer. A tour of Ireland soon followed. Also in 2006, the remix CD Ailgylchu (Recycle) was released, containing remixes by Welsh underground artists of Brigyn songs.

Brigyn achieved prominence in the media through successfully obtaining the permission of Leonard Cohen to release a Welsh-language version of his 1984 song "Hallelujah".

== Biography ==
Famed for their unique version of Hallelujah by Leonard Cohen, Brigyn are brothers Ynyr and Eurig Roberts from Snowdonia, North Wales.

A modern melodic folk outfit. The brothers cite various artists as influences, ranging from Björk to Simon & Garfunkel. They have performed at The Green Man Festival, Celtic Connections, Llangollen International Eisteddfod, Small Nations Festival, Sesiwn Fawr Dolgellau, and also at popular Welsh language festivals such as the Eisteddfod, Tafwyl and Gwyl y Faenol (Brynfest).

Following the success of their eponymously titled debut album in 2004, Brigyn released their second album Brigyn2 in Autumn 2005. Successful tours of San Francisco and Ireland followed in late 2005 and April 2006 respectively. A collection of songs were released exclusively on limited edition vinyl late in 2006 and a re-mix concept album, Ailgylchu, was released in August 2007. In late 2007, Brigyn performed at the inaugural Sŵn.

Their third studio album Brigyn3 was released in May 2008, and the promotional campaign for the album began with an exclusive live session in 'The Hub', London for Tom Robinson's show on BBC 6 Music.

Following a relentless touring schedule in 2008 that included a return to playing at the Green Man Festival, Brigyn released the single "Haleliwia" in November - a Welsh-language adaption of Leonard Cohen's, "Hallelujah". A Welsh-language single ("Yr Arth a'r Lloer" - "The Bear and the Moon") was released at the end of 2009.

Brigyn released their first ever English-language material in 2010; the single "One Way Streets" was made available on 1 March as a download from the iTunes Store, followed by the songs "Home" and "I need all the friends I can get", also available only to download or stream. Brigyn were given permission to use Charles M. Schulz's words from the famous Peanuts book for the song "I need all the friends I can get".

Brigyn competed and won the Pan Celtic Song Contest, Dingle in April 2011, as a result of Ynyr winning the Cân i Gymru competition a month earlier.

During 2012, Brigyn teamed up with Hefin Huws to arrange, record and perform a collection of songs from both their catalogues for the Cymdeithas yr Iaith celebratory festival "Hanner Cant".

In November 2014, to celebrate the 10th anniversary of Brigyn, a fourth collection of newly penned songs were release as an album, aptly named Brigyn 4.

Barely a year after the release of "Brigyn4", another collection of songs was released in 2015 under the title "Dulog" (Armadillo), named after the little creature that can be seen in Patagonia. The Patagonian theme ran strongly through the album - with direct references to the interesting history of 'Y Wladfa' and its people throughout the songs ['Malacara', 'Ana', 'Dôl y Plu' and 'Pentre sydyn' to name but a few]. The album concluded a year of special events to celebrate the 150th anniversary of Y Wladfa - the Welsh settlement in Patagonia.

During 2016, Brigyn performed the song "Gadael Bordeaux" for the first time on a BBC Radio Cymru. The song, co-written with Rhys Iorwerth commemorates the success of the Wales National Football Team in the Euro 2016 competition. In the absence of tours and concerts, and the European Champions Tournament in 2020, Brigyn re-recorded and released the song.

Brigyn's latest album was released in November 2019, titled "Lloer", contains mainly acoustic songs recorded live. This collection also showcased several contributors - including Bryn Terfel, Linda Griffiths (Plethyn), Meinir Gwilym and Gareth Bonello (The Gentle Good).
