= Iwan "Iwcs" Roberts =

Welsh actor and musician

- Born: Iwan Roberts; 1967 (age 58–59)
- Occupations: Actor, singer-songwriter, poet, artist
- Years active: 1985–present

Iwan "Iwcs" Roberts (born 1967) is a Welsh actor, lyricist, singer, and novelist.Script writer and film producer of Dal y Mellt series 1 and 2. He has worked on various films, including the BAFTA-winning productions Eldra and Y Lleill (The Others), and is well known for his portrayal of character Kevin Powell in the Welsh soap opera Pobol y Cwm. He has also had a successful career as a singer-songwriter, both as part of the duo Iwcs a Doyle and as a solo artist.He also worked as the presenter on his own radio show on radio cymru.

== Early life ==
Iwan Roberts was raised in the village of Trawsfynydd, Gwynedd. A creative talent and an avid performer from an early age, he gained his first stage experience while still a pupil at Ysgol Bro Hedd Wyn primary school.

== Career ==
=== Beginnings: 1985–1996 ===
After completing his secondary education at Ysgol y Moelwyn, Blaenau Ffestiniog, he enrolled on a course in engineering, with aspirations of becoming a blacksmith. At the same time, his love of performing led him to join the theatre group Theatr Bara Caws. He appeared in various theatre productions with Theatr Bara Caws, Theatr Arad Goch and others, before making his television debut in the comedy series Rhew Poeth, which was shown on the Welsh-language channel S4C in 1986. He also made a brief appearance in the BBC Wales soap opera Pobol y Cwm, and the popular comedy series C'mon Midffild in the 1980s, before going on to act in other Welsh language series including, Minafon and Lleifior. In 1994, he played the role of Dafydd in the period drama Y Wisg Sidan (The Silk Dress) (a screen adaptation of Elena Puw Morgan's novel). Also in 1994, Iwan played the lead role as Barry Pritchard in the drama series A55; the series won a BAFTA Cymru award in 1995 for Best Drama Series. Iwan Roberts also appeared in various film roles in the early 1990s, including Y Beicar (The Biker) and Gwynfyd (Blessedness).

=== Iwcs a Doyle: 1996–1999 ===
In 1996, Iwan Roberts diversified his career and together with guitarist John Doyle, formed a duo, calling themselves Iwcs a Doyle. The pair entered the annually held Cân i Gymru (Song for Wales) contest, and won the competition that year. Iwcs a Doyle released an album of songs in 1996 entitled Edrychiad Cynta' (First Look), which was produced by Les Morisson, and received popular and critical acclaim. The pair performed in many venues and music festivals, including Sesiwn Fawr Dolgellau, Wales, and the Pan Celtic Festival in Tralee, Ireland in 1996.

=== Television, theatre and film: 1999–2007 ===
Iwan Roberts continued to act during his time with Iwcs a Doyle – perhaps his most notable role being the portrayal of wine merchant Gary Lovell in the popular S4C drama Pengelli (1997–2000). In 1999 he appeared as the character Hari Bont in Porc Peis Bach (1999–2004), and later acted in the drama series Talcen Caled (2001–2003), a period drama screen adaptation of Marion Eames' novel Y Stafell Ddirgel (The Secret Room) (2002), and had a regular role in the teenage soap opera Xtra (2002–2003). During this period Roberts provided voice over for the restoration of the 1935 Ifan ab Owen Edwards film Y Chwarelwr (The Quarryman), as well as for various Welsh-language animations, and on various radio plays on BBC Radio Cymru.

Around this time Iwan Roberts also appeared in the one-man theatre and film production of the National Eisteddfod of Wales pryddest Awelon, acted the role of Elvis Presley in the two-person theatre show "Plant Gladys" (Gladys' Children), as well as appearing in the play "Bownsars" (a Welsh-language adaptation of John Godber's play 'Bouncers.

At the same time Iwan "Iwcs" Roberts appeared in the BAFTA-winning film Eldra (2003) and played the role of Paul in the Ankst production Y Lleill (The Others), which gained Institute of Contemporary Arts residency in December 2006, and which was also awarded a BAFTA for best film.

=== Solo musical career: 2005–2007 ===
Roberts composed and recorded his first solo album entitled Cynnal Fflam (Maintaining the Flame) in 2005. The album was recorded in Waunfawr, Gwynedd, was co-produced with Bob Galvin. Throughout his career as a performer and artist he has cited his primary inspiration and influences to be that of the natural living environment and the people around him.

=== Pobol y Cwm: 2007–2014 ===
Roberts returned to Pobol y Cwm in 2007 to play the role of Kevin Powell. He remained in this role as one of the main characters until 2014.

== Selected filmography ==
Year(s)	Title	Role	More information
2007–2014	Pobol y Cwm	Kevin Powell	Soap Opera; Series Regular
2005	Craig ac Eifion	Various Roles	Children's Entertainment Series
2005	Y Lleill	Paul	Feature Film; BAFTA Cymru Winner – Best Film; Lead Role
2005	Tri Tan y Manod	Cacan	Comedy; Lead Role
2004	Porc Peis Bach	Hari Bont	Comedy
2003	Awelon	Main Character	Short Film (Spoken-word); Lead
2003	Talcen Caled	Maldwyn	Series Regular
2002	Xtra	Bibs	Soap Opera; Lead Role
2002	Y Stafell Ddirgel		Period Drama
2001	Eldra		Feature Film; BAFTA Cymru Winner – Best Film
2000	Pengelli	Gary Lovell	Drama; Series Regular (Four Series)
1998	Y Band Pres		Television Film
1996	Iwcs y Forwyn Chalet	Himself	Documentary; Presenter
1995	Cegin y Diafol		Television Film
1994	A55	Barry Pritchard	Drama; BAFTA Cymru Winner – Best Drama; Lead Role
1994	Y Wisg Sidan	Dafydd	Period Drama
1992	Lleifior		Period Drama
1991	Gwynfyd		Television Film
1990	Y Beicar		Television Film
1990	Wadlo	Himself	Documentary Series; Presenter
1988	Pobol y Cwm	Kevin Powell	Soap Opera;
1987	Anest	Melfyn	Drama
1987	Minafon		Soap Opera
1986	C'mon Midffîld!		Comedy
1985	Rhew Poeth	Geraint	Drama
