= Cân i Gymru =

Welsh television show

- Also known as: Cân Disc a Dawn (1969–1972)
- Genre: Song competition
- Based on: Disc a Dawn
- Presented by: Elin Fflur (2011–present); Trystan Ellis-Morris (2015–present)
- Judges: Varies each year
- Country of origin: United Kingdom (Wales)
- Original language: Welsh
- No. of episodes: 54 editions

Production
- Production locations: Anglesey Showground (2026); Dragon Studios, Bridgend (2025); Swansea Arena (2024)
- Running time: 120 minutes (inc. adverts)
- Production company: Avanti (2006–present)

Original release
- Network: BBC One (1969); BBC One Wales (1970–1978, 1982); HTV (1979, 1981); BBC Radio Cymru (1980); S4C (1983–present)
- Release: 5 June 1969 – present

Cân i Gymru (English: A Song for Wales, Welsh pronunciation: [ˈkaːn i ˈɡəmrɨ]) is a Welsh-language television talent competition that is broadcast annually on S4C. It was first introduced in 1969 when BBC Cymru wanted to enter the Eurovision Song Contest. The winner of the contest represents Wales at the Celtavision Song Contest, which is held as part of the annual Pan Celtic Festival, in Ireland and is also awarded a cash prize (the exact amount has varied over the years).

== History ==
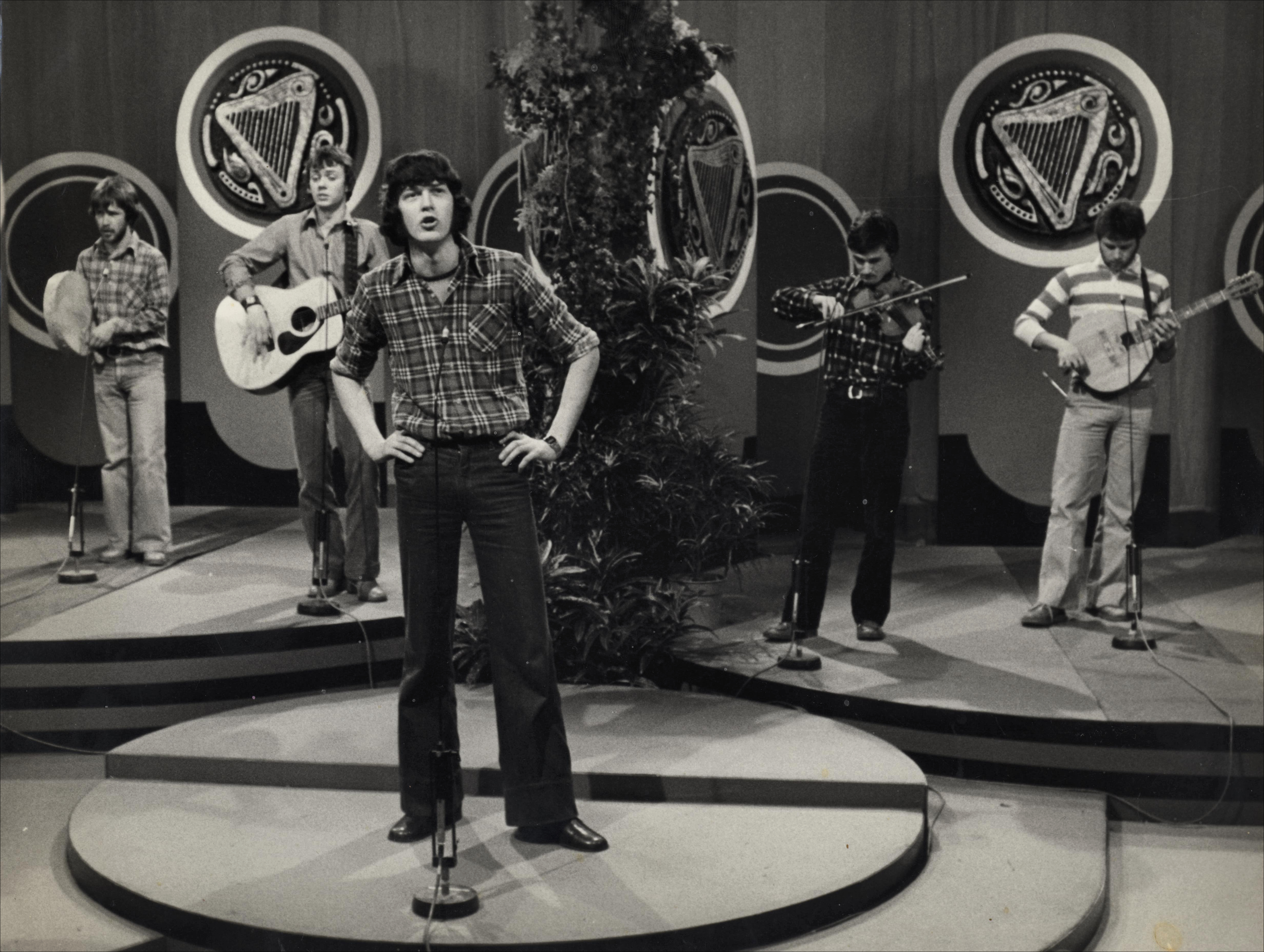
The folk group Cilmeri performing in the 1975 competition, placing second.

Former logo (2006 to 2023)

Cân i Gymru was presented to Wales under the name Cân Disc a Dawn, a competition based around the Welsh language pop music show Disc a Dawn (as seen on Victor Lewis Smith's TV Offal), for the first time in 1969. At the time, Meredydd Evans, head of light entertainment at BBC Cymru Wales, hoped that the winning song would be able to compete in the Eurovision Song Contest, although the BBC in London decided in the end that only one song from Britain would compete.

Eight programmes were broadcast in the series to select a Song for Wales with seven songs in each, performed by well-known singers of the time. The public voted by sending in letters and the song with the most votes went through to the final. The last programme was broadcast on 5 June 1969 throughout Britain on BBC1 under the title Song for Wales and was presented by Ronnie Williams in Welsh and English. A panel then chose the winning song on the night. The programme was also part of the BBC's provision for the Investiture of Prince Charles which would take place on 1 July 1969.

Following the establishment of the Pan Celtic Festival in Ireland in the early 1970s the Festival's Wales Committee started the Cân i Gymru competition once again in order to choose a song to represent Wales in the Celtavision competition. There was no competition in 1973. Initially the media in Wales did not have much interest in the competition. Cân i Gymru was not broadcast live on television, and a panel voted to choose the winners. For example, the 1980 competition was held at Bar Cefn yr Angel in Aberystwyth and was broadcast on BBC Radio Cymru.

The 2001 contest, held at the Llangollen Pavilion, took place without a live audience because of the foot-and mouth-outbreak. Twenty years later, only a virtual audience was allowed at the Wales Millennium Centre due to ongoing COVID restrictions. In 2003, there were special preview programmes where viewers were shown all the entrants from a category (one per programme). However by 2004, the previews were relegated into the childrens' strand Planed Plant and linked by the strand's continuity team.

By 1982 the competition was back on television but a panel still chose the winner. In later years, the winning song was chosen by a vote where members of the public phone for their favorite song. Due to technical issues in 2024, this vote was moved online in 2025. In 2024, the prize was £5,000 with £3,000 for second place and £2,000 for third place.

Unlike the majority of singing competitions in Europe, the emphasis is on the composer of the song rather than the performer. A compilation album was released in 2005 by Welsh record label Sain containing all the tracks that won the competition from its inception in 1969 to 2005. This was followed by individual compilation albums for the 2006 and 2007 competitions, both of which were released by TPF Records.

== Winners by year ==
Year	Singer	Song	English translation	Composer(s)
1969	Margaret Williams	"Y Cwilt Cymreig"	The Welsh Quilt	Llifon Hughes-Jones and Megan Lloyd Ellis
1970	Y Canolwyr	"Dydd o haf"	A Summer's Day	Hawys James
1971	Eleri Llwyd	"Nwy yn y Nen"	Gas in the Air	Dewi 'Pws' Morris
1972	Heather Jones	"Pan ddaw'r Dydd"	When the Day Comes	Geraint Jarman
1974	Iris Williams	"I gael Cymru'n Gymru Rhydd"	To make Wales a Free Wales	Rod Thomas and Rod Gruffydd
1975	Brân	"Caledfwlch"	Excalibur	Gwyndaf Roberts
1976	Rhian Rowe	"Y Llanc Glas Lygad"	The Blue-eyed Boy	Douglas Roberts
1977	Cawl Sefin	"Dafydd ap Gwilym"	Dafydd ap Gwilym	Peter Hughes Griffiths and Meinir Lloyd
1978	Delwyn Sion and Brân	"Angel ble wyt ti?"	Angel, Where are you?	John Gwyn and Ronw Protheroe
1979	Pererin	"Ni Welaf yr Haul"	I don't see the Sun	Arfon Wyn
1980	Plethyn	"Golau Tan Gwmwl"	A Light under a Cloud	Geraint Løvgreen and Myrddin ap Dafydd
1981	Beca	"Dechrau'r Dyfodol"	The Beginning of the Future	Gareth Glyn and Eleri Cwyfan
1982	Caryl Parry Jones and Bando	"Nid Llwynog Oedd yr Haul"	The Sun wasn't a Fox	Geraint Løvgreen and Myrddin ap Dafydd
1983	Siân Wheway and Robin Gwyn	"Popeth ond y Gwir"	Everything but the Truth	Siân Wheway and Robin Gwyn
1984	Geraint Griffiths	"Y Cwm"	The Valley	Huw Chiswell
1985	Bwchadanas	"Ceiliog y Gwynt"	The Weathervane	Euros Rhys Evans
1986	Eirlys Parri	"Be ddylwn i Ddweud"	What Should I Say?	Mari Emlyn
1987	Eryr Wen	"Gloria Tyrd Adre"	Gloria, Come Home	Euros Elis Jones and Llion Jones
1988	Manon Llwyd	"Can Wini"	Winnie's Song	Manon Llwyd and Eurig Wyn
1989	Hefin Huws	"Twll Triongl"	Triangular Hole	Hefin Huws and Les Morrison
1990	Sobin a'r Smaeliaid	"Gwlad y Rasta Gwyn"	Land of the White Rasta	Rhys Wyn Parry and Bryn Fôn
1991	Neil Williams a'r Band	"Yr Un Hen Le"	The Same Old Place	Richard Marks
1992	Eifion Williams	"Dal i Gredu"	Still Believing	Gwennant Pyrs, Meleri Roberts and Alwen Derbyshire
1993	Paul Gregory	"Y Cam Nesa"	The Next Step	Paul Gregory
1994	Geraint Griffiths	"Rhyw Ddydd"	Some Day	Paul Gregory, Lorraine King, Tim Hamill and Dave Parsons
1995	Gwenda Owen	"Yr Ynys Werdd"	The Emerald Isle	Richard Jones and Arwel John
1996	Iwcs a Doyle	"Cerrig yr Afon"	Stones of the River	Iwan Roberts and John Doyle
1997	Bryn Fôn	"Un Funud Fach"	One Short Minute	Barry Jones
1998	Arwel Wyn Roberts	"Rho Dy Law"	Place Your Hand	Rhodri Tomos
1999	Steffan Rhys Williams	"Torri'n Rhydd"	Breaking Free	Matthew McAvoy and Steffan Rhys Williams
2000	Martin Beattie	"Cae o Yd"	A Field of Corn	Arfon Wyn
2001	Geinor Haf	"Dagrau Ddoe"	Yesterday's Tears	Emlyn Dole
2002	Elin Fflur	"Harbwr Diogel"	A Safe Harbour	Arfon Wyn and Richard Synnott
2003	Non Parry and Steffan Rhys Williams	"Oes Lle i Mi"	Is there a Place for me?	Emma Walford and Mererid Hopwood
2004	Rhian Mair Lewis	"Dagrau Tawel"	Quiet Tears	Meinir Richards and Tudur Dylan
2005	Rhydian Bowen Phillips	"Mi Glywais"	I Heard	Dafydd Jones and Guto Vaughan
2006	Ryland Teifi	"Lili'r nos"	Lily of the Night	Ryland Teifi
2007	Einir Dafydd and Ceri Wyn Jones	"Blwyddyn Mas"	A Year Out	Einir Dafydd and Ceri Wyn Jones
2008	Aled Myrddin	"Atgofion"	Memories	Aled Myrddin
2009	Elfed Morgan Morris	"Gofidiau"	Worries	Lowri Watcyn Roberts and Elfed Morgan Morris
2010	Tomos Wyn Williams	"Bws i'r Lleuad"	A Bus to the Moon	Alun Evans
2011	Tesni Jones	"Rhywun yn Rhywle"	Somebody Somewhere	Steve Balsamo and Ynyr Gruffydd
2012	Gai Toms	"Braf yw Cael Byw"	Living's Fine	Gai Toms and Philip Jones
2013	Jessop a'r Sgweiri	"Mynd i Gorwen Hefo Alys"	Going to Corwen with Alys	Rhys Gwynfor and Osian Huw Williams
2014	Mirain Evans	"Galw Amdanat Ti"	Calling for You	Barry Evans and Mirain Evans
2015	Elin Angharad	"Y Lleuad a'r Sêr"	The Moon and the Stars	Elin Angharad and Arfon Wyn
2016	Cordia	"Dim ond Un"	Only One	Ffion Elin and Rhys Jones
2017	Cadi Gwyn Edwards	"Rhydd"	Free	Cadi Gwyn Edwards
2018	Ceidwad y Gân	"Cofio Hedd Wyn"	Remembering Hedd Wyn	Erfyl Owen
2019	Elidyr Glyn	"Fel Hyn 'da Ni Fod"	This is How we Should Be	Elidyr Glyn
2020	Gruffydd Wyn	"Cyn i’r Llenni Gau"	Before the Curtain Falls	Stuart Roslyn and T Jay
2021	Morgan Elwy Williams	"Bach o Hwne"	A Bit of That	Morgan Elwy Williams
2022	Ryland Teifi	"Mae yna Le"	There is a Place	Rhydian Meilir
2023	Dylan Morris	"Patagonia"	—N/a	Alistair James
2024	Sara Davies	"Ti"	You	Sara Davies
2025	Dros Dro	“Troseddwr yr Awr”	Criminal of the Hour	Dros Dro
2026	Sara Owen	“Y Gân”	The Song	Emlyn Gomer, Geth Tomos & Henry Priestman

== Hostings ==
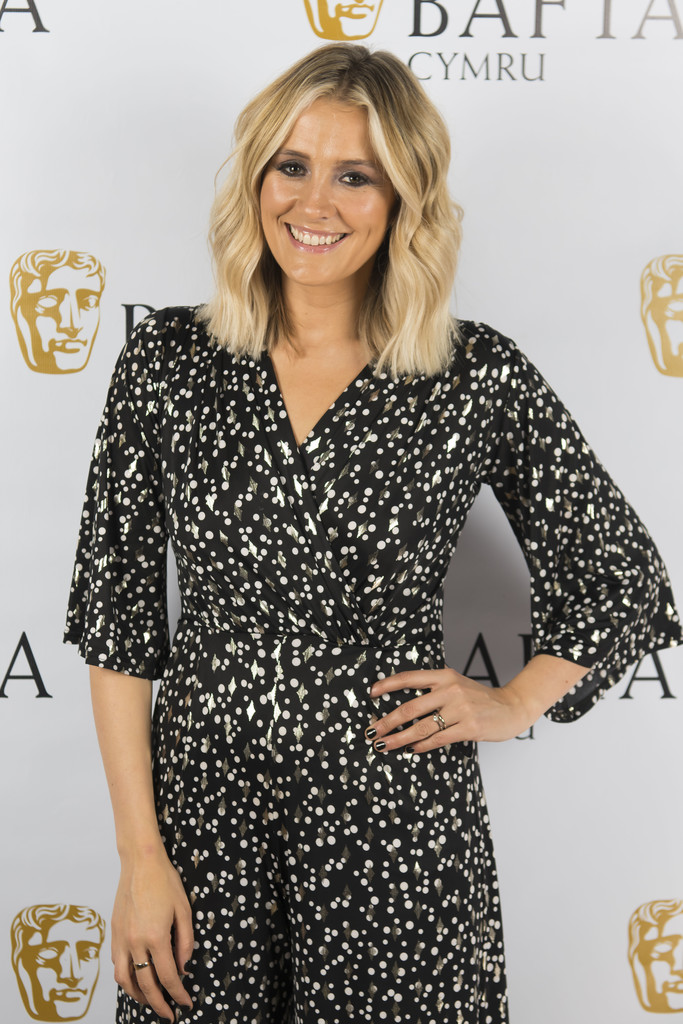
Elin Fflur, two-time participant and winner of the 33rd edition of the competition, has been a co-presenter of the show since 2011.

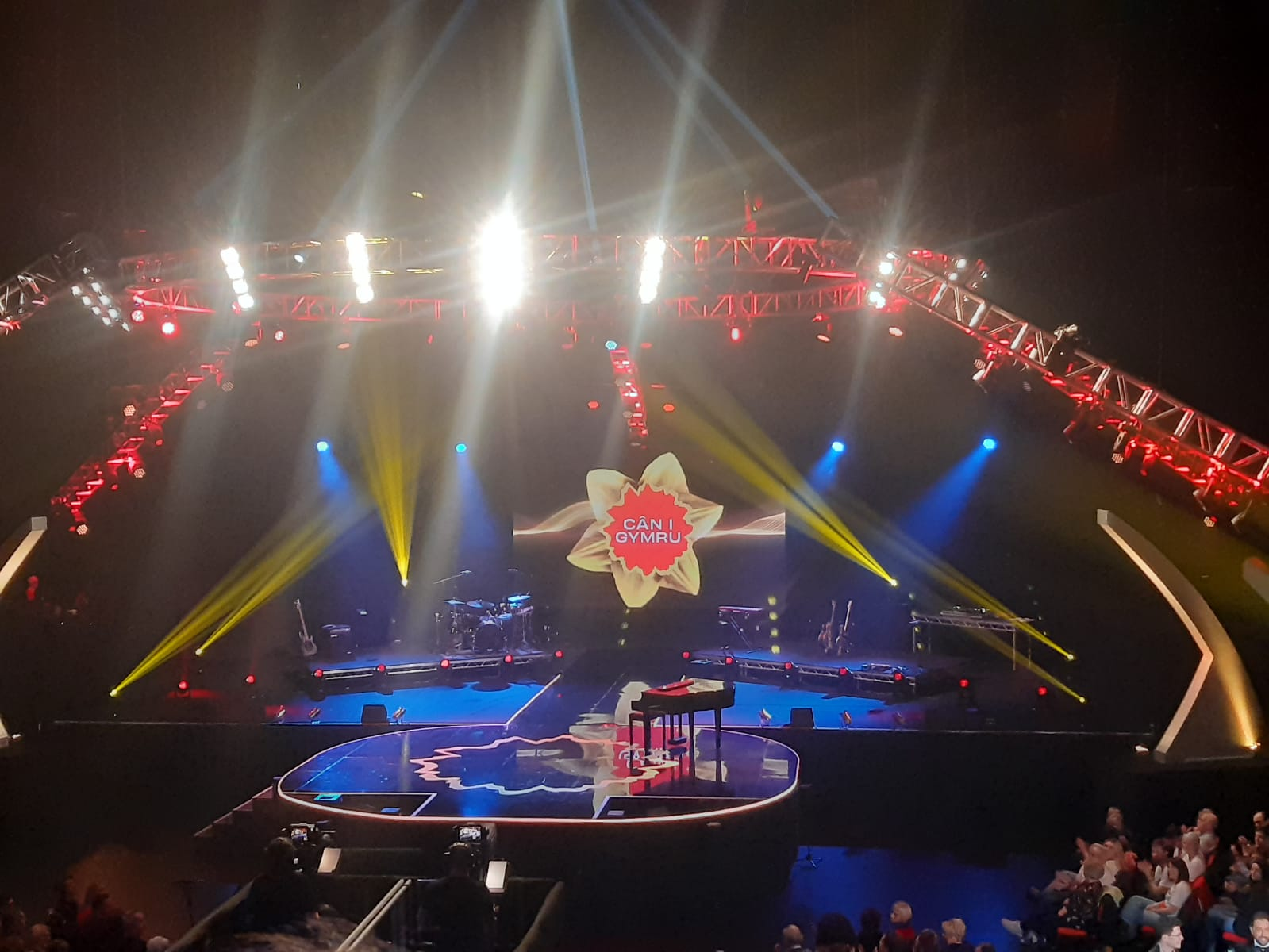
Swansea hosted the annual competition for the first time in 2024.

Year	Location	Presenter(s)	Production company	Broadcaster
1969	Newport	Ronnie Williams	BBC Cymru Wales	BBC1
1970	Cardiff	Ronnie Williams	BBC Cymru Wales	BBC1 Wales
1971	Cardiff	Huw Jones	BBC Cymru Wales	BBC1 Wales
1972	Cardiff	Unknown	BBC Cymru Wales	BBC1 Wales
1974	Cardiff	Dewi Morris	BBC Cymru Wales	BBC1 Wales
1975	Cardiff	Hywel Gwynfryn	BBC Cymru Wales	BBC1 Wales
1976	Cardiff	Unknown	BBC Cymru Wales	BBC1 Wales
1977	Cardiff	Gwyn Erfyl	BBC Cymru Wales	BBC1 Wales
1978	Cardiff	Unknown	BBC Cymru Wales	BBC1 Wales
1979	Cardiff	Arfon Haines Davies	HTV Productions	HTV
1980	Aberystwyth	Emyr Wyn and Mynediad am Ddim	BBC Cymru Wales	BBC Radio Cymru
1981	Mold	Gwyn Erfyl	HTV Productions	HTV
1982	Cardiff	Menna Gwyn and Emyr Wyn	BBC Cymru Wales	BBC1 Wales
1983	Cardiff	Emyr Wyn	BBC Cymru Wales	S4C
1984	Cardiff	Emyr Wyn	BBC Cymru Wales	S4C
1985	Cardiff	Emyr Wyn	BBC Cymru Wales	S4C
1986	Cardiff	Margaret Williams	BBC Cymru Wales	S4C
1987	Llandudno	Caryl Parry Jones	Teledu'r Tir Glas	S4C
1988	Llandudno	Geraint Griffiths	Teledu'r Tir Glas	S4C
1989	Llandudno	Nia Roberts	Teledu'r Tir Glas	S4C
1990	Caernarfon	Alaw Bennett Jones and Owain Gwilym	Teledu'r Tir Glas	S4C
1991	Caernarfon	Nia Roberts	Teledu'r Tir Glas	S4C
1992	Caernarfon	Nia Roberts	Teledu'r Tir Glas	S4C
1993	Caernarfon	Nia Roberts	Teledu'r Tir Glas	S4C
1994	Cardiff	Nia Roberts and Stifyn Parri	HTV Productions	S4C
1995	Pontrhydfendigaid	Nia Roberts	Apollo	S4C
1996	Pontrhydfendigaid	Nia Roberts	Apollo	S4C
1997	Pontrhydfendigaid	Nia Roberts	Apollo	S4C
1998	Cardiff	Nia Roberts	Apollo	S4C
1999	Corwen	Nia Roberts and Dafydd Meredydd	Apollo	S4C
2000	Llangollen	Nia Roberts and Dafydd Meredydd	Apollo	S4C
2001	Llangollen	Nia Roberts and Dafydd Meredydd	Apollo	S4C
2002	Port Talbot	Lisa Gwilym, and Angharad Llwyd	Apollo	S4C
2003	Port Talbot	Lisa Gwilym, and Angharad Llwyd	Apollo	S4C
2004	Newport	Sarra Elgan	Apollo	S4C
2005	Newport	Sarra Elgan and Alun Williams	Apollo	S4C
2006	Port Talbot	Sarra Elgan and Hefin Thomas	Avanti	S4C
2007	Port Talbot	Eleri Siôn and Dafydd Meredydd	Avanti	S4C
2008	Port Talbot	Sarra Elgan and Rhydian Bowen Phillips	Avanti	S4C
2009	Llandudno	Rhodri Owen and Sarra Elgan	Avanti	S4C
2010	Llandudno	Rhodri Owen and Sarra Elgan	Avanti	S4C
2011	Pontrhydfendigaid	Elin Fflur and Dafydd Meredydd	Avanti	S4C
2012	Pontrhydfendigaid	Elin Fflur and Dafydd Meredydd	Avanti	S4C
2013	Cardiff	Elin Fflur and Dafydd Meredydd	Avanti	S4C
2014	Gwalchmai	Elin Fflur and Gethin Evans	Avanti	S4C
2015	Gwalchmai	Elin Fflur and Trystan Ellis-Morris	Avanti	S4C
2016	Cardiff	Elin Fflur and Trystan Ellis-Morris	Avanti	S4C
2017	Cardiff	Elin Fflur and Trystan Ellis-Morris	Avanti	S4C
2018	Bangor	Elin Fflur and Trystan Ellis-Morris	Avanti	S4C
2019	Aberystwyth	Elin Fflur and Trystan Ellis-Morris	Avanti	S4C
2020	Aberystwyth	Elin Fflur and Trystan Ellis-Morris	Avanti	S4C
2021	Cardiff	Elin Fflur and Trystan Ellis-Morris	Avanti	S4C
2022	Aberystwyth	Elin Fflur and Trystan Ellis-Morris	Avanti	S4C
2023	Aberystwyth	Elin Fflur and Trystan Ellis-Morris	Avanti	S4C
2024	Swansea	Elin Fflur and Trystan Ellis-Morris	Avanti	S4C
2025	Bridgend	Elin Fflur and Trystan Ellis-Morris	Avanti	S4C
2026	Anglesey	Elin Fflur and Trystan Ellis-Morris	Avanti	S4C
2027	Cardiff	Elin Fflur and Trystan Ellis-Morris	Avanti	S4C

== See also ==
- Pan Celtic Festival
- Wales in the Eurovision Song Contest
