= Stonk =

Stonk, STONK or Stonks may refer to:

- "The Stonk", a 1991 novelty song by Hale & Pace
- STONK, the codename for a rifle in the novel The Eyre Affair by Jasper Fforde
- Stonk!, a 2009 album by Welsh band Derwyddon Dr Gonzo
- Stonks, a character from The Borrible Trilogy series of novels by Michael de Larrabeiti
- Stonks, an internet meme featuring Meme Man used to parody the stock market
