= Nia Roberts =

Nia Roberts may refer to:

- Nia Roberts (actress) (born 1972), Welsh actress
- Nia Roberts (presenter), Welsh radio and television presenter
