= Gareth Owen =

Gareth Owen may refer to:

- Gareth Owen (zoologist) (1922–2002), principal of Aberystwyth University, 1979–1989
- Gareth Owen (footballer, born 1971), Welsh football player and manager
- Gareth Owen (footballer, born 1982), Welsh football player
- Gareth Owen (pianist), British classical pianist
- Gareth Owen (presenter) (born 1984), Welsh TV presenter
- Gareth Owen (rugby union) (born 1988), Welsh rugby union player
- Gareth Owen (rugby league, born 1992), English rugby league footballer
- Gareth Owen (Welsh rugby league), rugby league footballer of the 1980s for Wales and Oldham
- Gareth Owen (sound designer) (born 1977), British theatrical sound designer
- Gareth Owen (writer), Birmingham writer and poet see Birmingham Arts Lab

== See also ==
- Gary Owen (disambiguation)
