= 2022 Isle of Anglesey County Council election =

2022 Welsh local government election

- 5 May 2022

All 35 seats to Isle of Anglesey County Council 18 seats needed for a majority
	First party	Second party	Third party
Party	Plaid Cymru	Independent	Labour
Last election	14	13	2
Seats before	16	16	2
Seats won	21	10	3
Seat change	▲5	▼6	▲1
Popular vote	21,775	15,756	2,897
Percentage	40.7%	29.5%	5.4%
Swing	▼0.3%	▼7.2%	▼9.3%
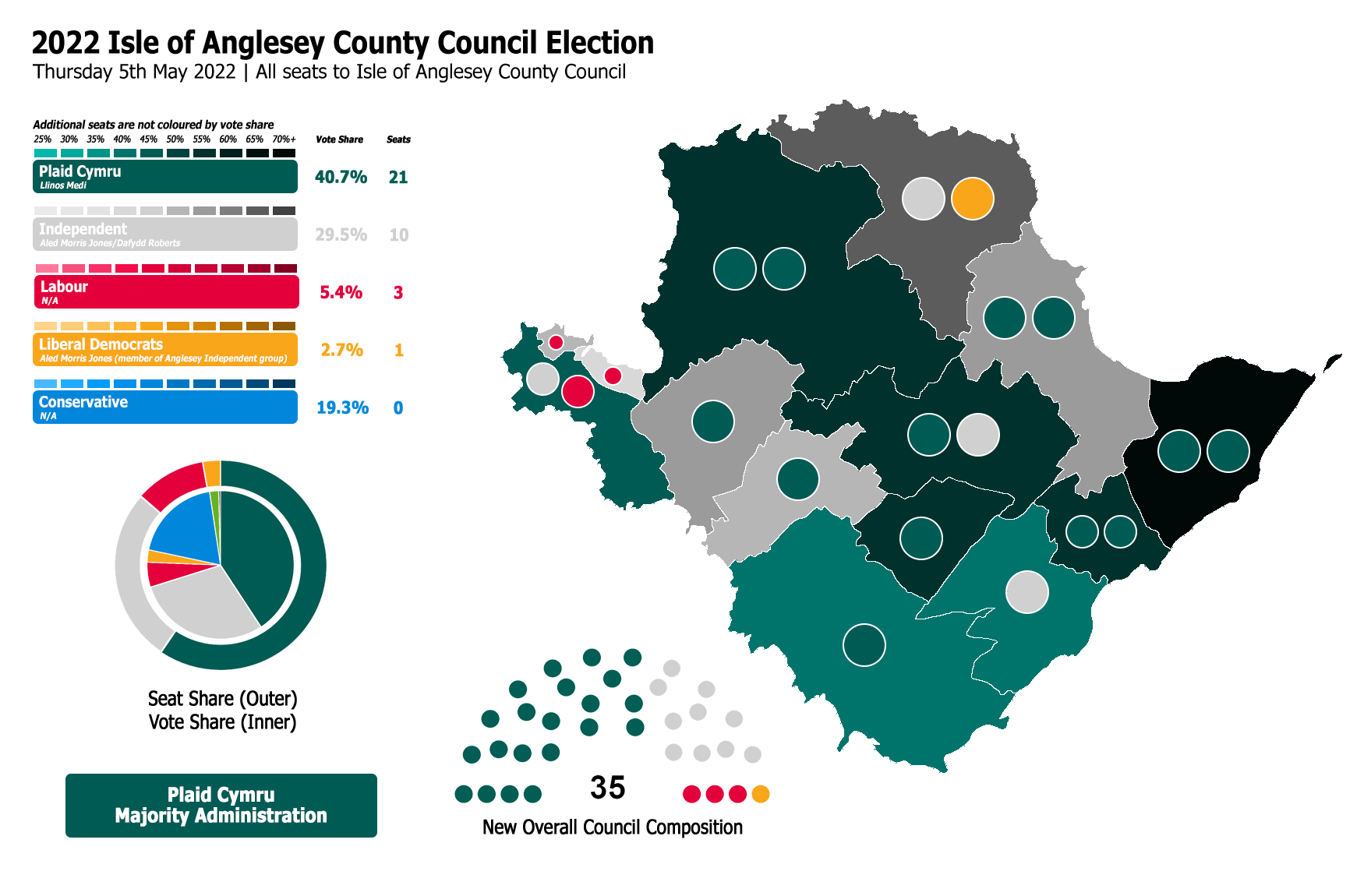
- Map of the election result by ward
Council control before election
No overall control
Plaid Cymru/Independent
Council control after election
Majority administration
Plaid Cymru

The 2022 Isle of Anglesey County Council election took place on Thursday 5 May 2022 to elect all 35 members of Isle of Anglesey County Council. It was held on the same day as all other councils in Wales, as part of the 2022 Welsh local elections.

The election saw the number of councillors elected to Isle of Anglesey County Council increase, from 30 to 35, as part of boundary changes to the council carried out by the Local Democracy and Boundary Commission for Wales.

Plaid Cymru gained the council from no overall control, leading to the first administration formed of only political parties since the council's creation in 1996.

== Background ==
At the previous election in 2017, no party won an overall majority. Plaid Cymru won 14 seats and fell just two shy of winning a majority. Independent candidates won 14 seats and the three remaining seats were won by Labour and the Liberal Democrats. As a result, the council was governed by a Plaid-independent coalition.

Boundary reviews were carried out by the Local Democracy and Boundary Commission for Wales in advance of the election. As a result, the number of electoral divisions was increased from 11 to 14 and the number of councillors was increased from 30 to 35.

== Election summary ==
Isle of Anglesey County Council election result 2022
Party	Candidates						Votes		
Party	Stood	Elected	Gained	Unseated	Net	% of total	%	No.	Net %
Plaid Cymru	24	21	N/A	N/A	▲5	60.0	40.7	21,775	-0.3
Independent	26	10	N/A	N/A	▼6	28.6	29.5	15,756	-7.2
Conservative	35	0	N/A	N/A	0	0.0	19.3	10,300	+15.1
Labour	6	3	N/A	N/A	▲1	8.6	5.4	2,897	-9.3
Liberal Democrats	1	1	N/A	N/A	0	2.9	2.7	1,442	-0.5
Green	4	0	N/A	N/A	0	0.0	2.0	1,083	New
Reform	1	0	N/A	N/A	0	0.0	0.2	108	New
Propel	2	0	N/A	N/A	0	0.0	0.1	63	New
Heritage	1	0	N/A	N/A	0	0.0	0.1	48	New

== Ward results ==
The percentage shown for each candidate in multi-member wards is a percentage of the vote against the turnout of the election, as due to the nature of multi member wards, electors each have a number of votes equal to the number of seats available, however each elector does not have to use all their available votes.

=== Aethwy ===
Aethwy (3)
Party	Candidate	Votes	%	±%
Plaid Cymru	Dyfed Wyn Jones	1,491	59.7	N/A
Plaid Cymru	Robin Wyn Williams	1,489	59.6	N/A
Plaid Cymru	Alun Mummery	1,329	55.7	N/A
Labour	Michael Marchbanks	696	27.6	N/A
Conservative	Steven Green	372	14.9	N/A
Green	Laurence Carver	359	14.4	N/A
Conservative	Mark Edwards	338	13.5	N/A
Conservative	Mark Salisbury	310	12.4	N/A
Majority		N/A	N/A	N/A
Turnout		2,505	46.9	N/A
Plaid Cymru win (new seat)				
Plaid Cymru win (new seat)				
Plaid Cymru win (new seat)				

=== Bodowyr ===
Bodowyr (2)
Party	Candidate	Votes	%	±%
Plaid Cymru	Alwen Pennant Watkin	536	40.5	N/A
Independent	Dafydd Roberts	511	38.6	N/A
Independent	Eric Jones	467	35.2	N/A
Labour	Einion Williams	390	29.4	N/A
Conservative	Angela Smith	126	9.5	N/A
Green	Andy Beaumont	117	8.8	N/A
Conservative	Adam William Môn Bakewell	110	8.3	N/A
Majority		N/A	N/A	N/A
Turnout		1,326	46.1	N/A
Plaid Cymru win (new seat)				
Independent win (new seat)				

=== Bro Aberffraw ===
Bro Aberffraw (2)
Party	Candidate	Votes	%	±%
Plaid Cymru	Arfon Wyn	714	44.7	N/A
Plaid Cymru	John Ifan Jones	662	41.5	N/A
Independent	Peter Rogers	650	40.7	N/A
Independent	Bryan Owen	529	33.1	N/A
Conservative	Ray Robertshaw	162	10.2	N/A
Conservative	Dillon Hughes	157	9.8	N/A
Independent	Daniel Ap Eifion Jones	80	5.0	N/A
Majority		N/A	N/A	N/A
Turnout		1,606	51.9	N/A
Plaid Cymru win (new seat)				
Plaid Cymru win (new seat)				

=== Bro'r Llynnoedd ===
Bro'r Llynnoedd (2)
Party	Candidate	Votes	%	±%
Independent	Gwilym Jones	830	53.3	N/A
Plaid Cymru	Ken Taylor	670	43.0	N/A
Independent	Glyn Jones	480	30.8	N/A
Conservative	Celfyn Furlong	431	27.7	N/A
Conservative	Dafydd Williams	298	19.1	N/A
Majority		N/A	N/A	N/A
Turnout		1,564	39.6	N/A
Independent win (new seat)				
Plaid Cymru win (new seat)				

=== Canolbarth Môn ===
Canolbarth Môn (3)
Party	Candidate	Votes	%	±%
Plaid Cymru	Non Dafydd	1,118	58.5	N/A
Plaid Cymru	Dylan Rees	1,054	55.1	N/A
Independent	Paul Ellis	927	48.5	N/A
Plaid Cymru	Sonia Williams	849	44.5	N/A
Independent	Llinos Roberts	545	28.5	N/A
Independent	Robat Idris	506	26.5	N/A
Conservative	Maureen Davies	124	6.5	N/A
Conservative	Stuart Walton	103	5.4	N/A
Conservative	Nicholas Grenfell-Marten	86	4.5	N/A
Majority		N/A	N/A	N/A
Turnout		1,911	46.2	N/A
Plaid Cymru win (new seat)				
Plaid Cymru win (new seat)				
Independent win (new seat)				

=== Cefni ===
Cefni (2)
Party	Candidate	Votes	%	±%
Plaid Cymru	Geraint ap Ifan Bebb	698	55.6	N/A
Plaid Cymru	Nicola Roberts	676	53.8	N/A
Independent	Lois Roberts	375	29.9	N/A
Independent	Sioned McGuigan	341	27.1	N/A
Conservative	Maureen Davies	124	6.5	N/A
Conservative	Stuart Walton	103	5.4	N/A
Propel	Peter Davey	32	2.5	N/A
Propel	Clare Davey	31	2.5	N/A
Majority		N/A	N/A	N/A
Turnout		1,256	50.4	N/A
Plaid Cymru win (new seat)				
Plaid Cymru win (new seat)				

=== Crigyll ===
Crigyll (2)
Party	Candidate	Votes	%	±%
Independent	Douglas Massie Fowlie	786	54.5	N/A
Plaid Cymru	Neville Evans	657	45.6	N/A
Independent	Stephanie Roberts	475	33.0	N/A
Independent	Richard Dew	431	29.9	N/A
Conservative	Carron White	105	7.3	N/A
Conservative	Felicity Elphick	79	5.5	N/A
Majority		N/A	N/A	N/A
Turnout		1,442	53.4	N/A
Independent win (new seat)				
Plaid Cymru win (new seat)				

=== Lligwy ===
Lligwy (3)
Party	Candidate	Votes	%	±%
Independent	Ieuan Williams	1,256	55.9	N/A
Plaid Cymru	Euryn Morris	1,031	45.9	N/A
Plaid Cymru	Margaret Murley Roberts	1,001	44.6	N/A
Conservative	Kevin Mawdesley	691	30.8	N/A
Conservative	Barbara Price	663	29.5	N/A
Conservative	Paul Flower	591	26.3	N/A
Reform	Sam Wood	108	4.8	N/A
Majority		N/A	N/A	N/A
Turnout		2,255	45.5	N/A
Independent win (new seat)				
Plaid Cymru win (new seat)				
Plaid Cymru win (new seat)				

=== Parc a'r Mynydd ===
Parc a'r Mynydd (2)
Party	Candidate	Votes	%	±%
Independent	Bob Llwelyn Jones	504	51.2	N/A
Labour	Glyn Haynes	488	49.6	N/A
Independent	Adrienne Edwards	292	29.7	N/A
Conservative	Abi Jenkins	169	17.2	N/A
Conservative	Mark Rayner	135	13.7	N/A
Majority		N/A	N/A	N/A
Turnout		988	35.1	N/A
Independent win (new seat)				
Labour win (new seat)				

=== Seiriol ===
Seiriol (3)
Party	Candidate	Votes	%	±%
Plaid Cymru	Carwyn Jones	1,516	71.4	N/A
Plaid Cymru	Gary Pritchard	1,319	62.1	N/A
Plaid Cymru	Alun Roberts	1,307	61.5	N/A
Green	Sarah Kendal	465	21.9	N/A
Conservative	Robert Brown	429	20.2	N/A
Conservative	Hugo Croft	364	17.1	N/A
Conservative	Philip Roper	353	16.6	N/A
Majority		N/A	N/A	N/A
Turnout		2,134	45.0	N/A
Plaid Cymru win (new seat)				
Plaid Cymru win (new seat)				
Plaid Cymru win (new seat)				

=== Talybolion ===
Talybolion (3)
Party	Candidate	Votes	%	±%
Plaid Cymru	Llinos Medi	1,025	56.6	N/A
Plaid Cymru	Llio Angharad Owen	711	39.2	N/A
Plaid Cymru	Jackie Lewis	626	34.5	N/A
Independent	Kenneth Hughes	597	32.9	N/A
Independent	Catrin Thomas	480	26.5	N/A
Conservative	Rhian Boylan	365	20.1	N/A
Conservative	Tania Cullen	321	17.7	N/A
Conservative	Stayce Weeder	259	14.3	N/A
Independent	Rhys Parry	247	13.6	N/A
Green	Paul Cross	142	7.8	N/A
Heritage	Rob Gordon	48	2.6	N/A
Majority		N/A	N/A	N/A
Turnout		1,812	43.4	N/A
Plaid Cymru win (new seat)				
Plaid Cymru win (new seat)				
Plaid Cymru win (new seat)				

=== Tref Cybi ===
Tref Cybi (2)
Party	Candidate	Votes	%	±%
Independent	Jeff Evans	368	40.9	N/A
Labour	Pip O'Neill	327	36.3	N/A
Labour	Hywel Williams	300	33.4	N/A
Plaid Cymru	Michael Bailey	246	27.4	N/A
Plaid Cymru	Howard Browes	212	23.6	N/A
Conservative	Graham Smith	104	11.6	N/A
Conservative	Jason Weeder	85	9.5	N/A
Majority		N/A	N/A	N/A
Turnout		903	29.9	N/A
Independent win (new seat)				
Labour win (new seat)				

=== Twrcelyn ===
Twrcelyn (3)
Party	Candidate	Votes	%	±%
Independent	Derek Owen	1,494	65.6	N/A
Independent	Liz Wood	1,477	64.9	N/A
Liberal Democrats	Aled Morris Jones	1,442	63.4	N/A
Conservative	John Gill	471	20.7	N/A
Conservative	Keith Fitton	460	20.2	N/A
Conservative	Leah Marie Fitton	378	16.6	N/A
Majority		N/A	N/A	N/A
Turnout		2,289	39.7	N/A
Independent win (new seat)				
Independent win (new seat)				
Liberal Democrats win (new seat)				

=== Ynys Gybi ===
Ynys Gybi (3)
Party	Candidate	Votes	%	±%
Plaid Cymru	Trefor Lloyd Hughes	838	20.55	N/A
Independent	Dafydd Rhys Thomas	769	18.87	N/A
Labour	Keith Roberts	696	17.08	N/A
Conservative	Bethan Davies	623	15.28	N/A
Conservative	Kathryn Owen	465	11.41	N/A
Conservative	Alexandre Lovell-Smith	346	8.49	N/A
Independent	Anwen Denise McCann	339	8.32	N/A
Majority		N/A	N/A	N/A
Turnout		4076 votes (each elector could cast 3 votes)	39.4	N/A
Plaid Cymru win (new seat)				
Independent win (new seat)				
Labour win (new seat)				

== By-elections between 2022 and 2027 ==
=== Ynys Gybi (2026) ===
A by-election was held on 5 February 2026 following the death of Plaid Cymru councillor, Trefor Lloyd Hughes, on 13 November 2025. The by-election was won by Reform UK's Celfyn Furlong.

Ynys Gybi by-election: 5 February 2026
Party	Candidate	Votes	%	±%
Reform	Celfyn Furlong	603	43.9	New
Plaid Cymru	Bethan Jones	343	25	▲4.4
Labour	Mary Roberts	171	12.5	▼4.6
Green	Nick Bounds	118	8.6	New
Conservative	Margaret John	112	8.2	▼27
Independent	Robert Williams	26	1.9	▼25.3
Majority		260	18.9	N/A
Turnout		1,373	33.3	−6.1
Reform gain from Plaid Cymru		Swing	N/A	

The by-election was caused by the death of Plaid Cymru councillor Trefor Lloyd Hughes on 13 November 2025.

=== Bro'r Llynnoedd (2026) ===
Bro'r Llynnoedd
Party	Candidate	Votes	%	±%
Plaid Cymru	John Taylor	551	48.5	+13.8
Reform	Richard Jones	446	39.3	N/A
Conservative	Margaret John	93	8.2	−14.1
Green	Nick Bounds	45	4.0	N/A
Majority		105	9.3	N/A
Turnout		1135	28.7	−10.9
Plaid Cymru hold		Swing		

== Aftermath ==
Plaid Cymru won control of the council after winning 21 of the 35 seats. Independent candidates took 10 seats, Labour won three and the Liberal Democrats won one seat. Anglesey was one of four councils won by Plaid Cymru across Wales. It was the first time since the council's creation in 1996 that a political party had taken control of the council.
