= Cân i Gymru 2010 =

- Country: Wales

National selection
- Selection process: Cân i Gymru 2010; 50% Jury; 50% Televoting
- Selection date(s): 28 February 2010
- Selected artist(s): Alun Evans
- Selected song: "Bws i'r Lleuad"

Wales in the Cân i Gymru

Cân i Gymru 2010 was the forty-first edition of S4C's Cân i Gymru, an annual Welsh singing contest. The 2010 edition was broadcast live on 28 February 2010 from Venue Cymru, Llandudno. The show was also available to watch online as well as a live radio commentary. The winner was given an invitation to represent Wales at the Pan Celtic Festival.

== Format ==
S4C and Avanti invited composers and authors to send in their songs from 15 October 2009 and were given a closing date of 11 December 2009. Songs had to be submitted on a CD, cassette or MP3 file along with a submission form. Other rules stated that:

- the song must be in Welsh
- entrants must be over 16 on the closing date
- the lyrics and song must be original
- the song must not have been made available before the closing date

A panel of judges will evaluate each entry before submitting a shortlist of eight songs which will be chosen to be performed live on the show. The winning composer(s)/author(s) will be awarded £10,000 and an invitation to enter their song into the Pan Celtic Festival in Ireland. The second place entry will receive a £2,000 prize.

Former Catatonia band member Owen Powell will chair the Cân i Gymru jury and he said of the 2010 show "Cân i Gymru is a unique competition which offers both budding and established composers the chance to gain wider recognition for their work. The live final is always a fantastic occasion – and with a top prize of £10,000 as well as the chance to represent Wales in Ireland, I’m confident the response this year will be as strong as ever."

The winner of Cân i Gymru 2010 will be decided by a 50% jury vote and 50% televote.

== Entrants ==
Final: 28 February 2010
Draw	Artist	Song	Place
1	Megan Rhys Williams	"Gwên ar fy Wyneb"	
2	Alun Evans	"Bws i'r Lleuad"	1st
3	Gai Toms	"Deffra"	3rd
4	Matthew Wall/Deio Jones	"Ti a ddaeth o Dramor"	
5	Osian Howells	"Aros yn yr Un Lle"	
6	Lowri Evans/Lee Mason	"Pob Siawns"	
7	Jaci Williams/Aron Elias	"Gorwel"	2nd
8	Simon Gardner/ Andrew Moore/ Tudur Morgan	"Glyndŵr"	
