= Siân Hope =

British professor

Professor Siân Hope OBE, MPhil, MBCS
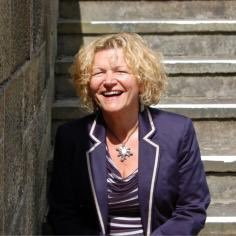
- Born: 1 May 1959 (age 67)
- Citizenship: British
- Occupations: Professor of Computer Science, Former Pro-Vice-Chancellor at Bangor University, Former High Sheriff of Gwynedd
- Title: Professor
- Children: 2, including Cara Hope

Academic background
- Education: University of Wales Former Polytechnic of Wales (1975–1992); Bangor University

Academic work
- Discipline: Computer Science

Professor Siân Hope OBE MPhil MBCS (née Griffiths; born 1 May 1959), is a Welsh Professor of Computer Science and former Pro-Vice-Chancellor and Executive Director of Innovation at Bangor University. Hope was appointed the Order of the British Empire (OBE) in the Queen's 2012 Birthday Honours List for services to Innovation and Computing in the United Kingdom. She was appointed the High Sheriff of Gwynedd in 2017-2018.

She is the mother of Wales rugby union international player Cara Hope.

== Early life ==
Hope was born on 1 May 1959 in Luton, England, despite spending most of her childhood growing up in Cynghordy, South Wales. the daughter of Marian and Roland Griffiths, a former headmaster at Ysgol Gyfun Pantycelyn.

Hope enrolled to the then Polytechnic of Wales, now the University of Glamorgan to study accounting before switching to the study of computer science, in which she later became a professor.

== Career ==
Hope joined Bangor University as a software engineer and then a lecturer, subsequently becoming executive director of innovation and professor of computer science. Following on from this she became pro-vice-chancellor of Bangor University, under the then Vice-Chancellor Merfyn Jones. She became a director at the Research Institute of Visual Computing. Alongside Bridget Emmett, Hope was announced as an inaugural member of the Science Advisory Council for Wales (SACW) in 2011.

Hope was chair for The North West Nuclear Arc Science (NWNA) Innovation Audit in 2018 in collaboration with the Welsh Government.

She was the university lead, founding director, and a member of the board of directors at M-Sparc, Wales' first Science Park, from 2013-2021.

Hope has been a board member for the Anglesey Enterprise Zone since 2014.

== Honours ==
Hope was appointed the Order of the British Empire (OBE) in the Queen's Birthday Honours List in 2012 for services to Innovation and Computing in the United Kingdom.

She was appointed the high sheriff of Gwynedd in 2017-2018.

== Publications ==
- Qualitative Studies of XP in a Medium Sized Business. / Hope, S.; Gittens, R.G.; Williams, I. et al. Extreme Programming Perspectives. 2002. ed. Addison Wesley, 2002. p. 421-437.
- Location Identification System and Method for a Mobile Communications Network. / Hope, S. (Inventor). Patent No.: 0617645.7. Dec 08, 2007.

== Personal life ==
She is married to Peter Hope with whom she has two children. Her first child is Welsh rugby union international player Cara Hope (born in 1993) and her second child was born in 1996. Both of her children were born in Ysbyty Gwynedd, Bangor.

Since moving to work at Bangor University, Hope has lived and continues to live in the village of Llangaffo, Isle of Anglesey.
