= Cân i Gymru 2011 =

Welsh singing contest

- Country: Wales

National selection
- Selection process: Cân i Gymru 2011; 50% Jury; 50% Televoting
- Selection date(s): 6 March 2010
- Selected artist(s): Tesni Jones
- Selected song: "Rhywun yn Rhywle"

Wales in the Cân i Gymru

Cân i Gymru 2011 was the forty-second edition of S4C's Cân i Gymru, an annual Welsh singing contest. The 2011 was broadcast live on 6 March 2011 from the Pontrhydfendigaid Pavilion, Pontrhydfendigaid. The winner was given an invitation to represent Wales at the Pan Celtic Festival. The final was hosted by former winner Elin Fflur.

== Format ==
S4C and Avanti invited composers and authors to send in their songs from 8 November 2010 and were given a closing date of 7 January 2011. The 8 finalists were announced on 22 February 2011.

A panel of judges evaluated each entry before submitting a shortlist of eight songs to be performed live on the show. The winning composer(s)/author(s) were awarded a £7,500 prize and got an invitation to enter their song into the Pan Celtic Festival in Ireland.

The winner of Cân i Gymru 2011 was decided by a 50% jury vote and 50% televote.

== Entrants ==
Final: 6 March 2011
Draw	Artist	Song	Place
1	Gemma Markham	"Symud Ymlaen"	
2	Ed Holden	"Chwarae Ceg"	
3	Gai Toms	"Clywch"	3rd
4	Anna Tomos	"Nerth dy draed"	
5	Ffion Emyr	"Cofia am y Cariad"	2nd
6	Brychan Llyr	"Cylch o Gariad"	
7	Alys Williams	"Fy Mhlentyn i"	
8	Tesni Jones	"Rhywun yn Rhywle"	1st
