= Lowri =

Lowri is a Welsh feminine variant of the given name Laura. Notable people with the name include:

- Lowri Gwilym (1954–2010), Welsh television and radio producer
- Lowri Morgan, Welsh television presenter and marathon runner
- Lowri Roberts (born 1997), Welsh squash player
- Lowri Shone (born 1996), English ballerina
- Lowri Thomas (born 1999), British and Welsh track cyclist
- Lowri Turner (born 1964), British fashion journalist and television presenter
- Lowri Tynan (born 1987), Welsh swimmer
