= Cân i Gymru 2009 =

Wales in the Cân i Gymru 2009
- Cân i Gymru 2009
- Country: Wales
- Selection process: Cân i Gymru 2009; 50% Jury; 50% Televoting
- Selection date: 1 March 2009

Competing entry
- Song: "Gofidiau"
- Artist: Elfed Morgan

Participation chronology

Cân i Gymru 2009 was the fortieth edition of S4C's Cân i Gymru, an annual Welsh singing contest. The 2009 edition was held in Venue Cymru, Llandudno. It was presented by Sarra Elgan and Rhydian Bowen Phillips. On the jury there were 6 judges. The winner was teacher Elfed Morgan with the song Gofiadau.

== Participants ==
Final - 19 January 2009
| Draw | Artist | Song | Place |
|---|---|---|---|
| 1 | Tesni Jones | "Gafael yn fy llaw" | 2 |
| 2 | Elfed Morgan | "Gofidiau" | 1 |
| 3 | Angharad Bryn | "Fy enaid gyda ti" | 3 |
| 4 | Sara Louise | "Un peth dwi'n gwybod" | N/a |
| 5 | Arfon Wyn | "Cyn i'r haul fynd lawr" | N/a |
| 6 | Matthew Wall | "Hedfan i ffwrdd" | N/a |
| 7 | Joe Broker | "Gi Ceffyl" | N/a |
| 8 | Elin Fflur | "Adenydd" | N/a |
