= Garryowen =

Garryowen may refer to:

- Garryowen, Limerick, Ireland, a suburb of the Irish city
  - Garryowen Football Club, a Limerick rugby union club
    - Garryowen (rugby), a rugby kick also known as the "bomb" or "up and under"
- "Garryowen" (air), an Irish jig tune
  - The U.S. 7th Cavalry Regiment, known as "Garryowen" for its use of the Irish air as a marching tune
- Garryowen, Iowa, United States
- Garryowen, Montana, United States
- Garryowen, New South Wales, small settlement on Little Billabong Creek
- Garryowen (film), a 1920 British film
- Edmund Finn, or Garryowen (1819–1898), Irish-Australian writer
- Garry Owen (actor) (1902–1951), American actor
- Garryowen Equestrienne Turnout, the major equestrienne competition of Australia held at the Royal Melbourne Show

== See also ==
- Gary Owen (disambiguation)
