= Uned 5 =

- Presented by: Various
- Country of origin: United Kingdom (Wales)
- No. of episodes: 1,159

Production
- Producer: Antena/Dimegoch

Original release
- Network: S4C
- Release: 17 February 1994 – 30 May 2010

Uned 5 ("Unit 5") is a BAFTA award-winning teenage magazine show, broadcast live every week on Welsh channel S4C between 1994 and 2010. The programme was the channel's flagship youth magazine for over sixteen years.

On 24 November 2009, S4C announced that the programme would be axed as part of a major revamp of the station's youth programming. The last edition of Uned 5 was broadcast on Sunday 30 May 2010.

== Format ==
The show was broadcast from a purpose-built 'house' at a studio in Caernarfon, and featured celebrity guests, news items, lively chat, bands, sketches and filmed interviews. Despite the obvious ties to The Big Breakfast, the show originally had more in common with the BBC's Blue Peter, until later relaunches saw Uned 5 target an older, teenage audience.

== Presenters ==
During its time on air, Uned 5 was fronted by 21 presenters – many of whom gone on to present further shows on S4C and other channels, notably Rhodri Owen who became a reporter for the BBC travel show Holiday and Gethin Jones who went on to present Blue Peter.

The presenters are mostly remembered in the following line-ups:

- Gaynor Davies, Garmon Emyr and Nia Dafydd
- Heledd Cynwal, Rhodri Owen and Nia Elin
- Catrin Mai, Lowri Morgan and Bedwyr Rees (with Carwyn Llyr)
- Lisa Gwilym, Gareth Owen and Gethin Jones
- Llinos Lee, Mari Lövgreen and Rhydian Bowen Phillips
- Tudur Evans, Gwawr Loader and Leni Hatcher (with Elliw Baines and Gwenno Haf)
The original presenting line-up: Nia Dafydd, Garmon Emyr and Gaynor Davies

The presenting line-up in 2004: Lisa Gwilym, Gareth Owen and Gethin Jones
