= Cara Hope =

Wales international rugby union player

Cara Mai Hope
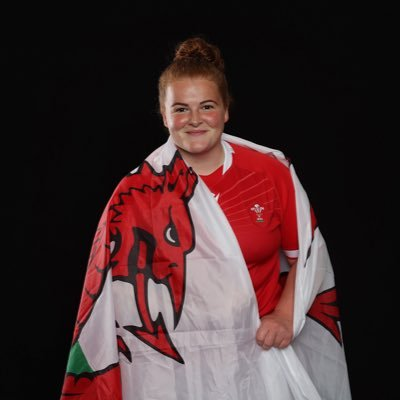
- Born: 24 November 1993 (age 32) Bangor, Wales
- Height: 1.63 m (5.3 ft)
- Weight: 97.27 kg (15.317 st)
- School: Ysgol David Hughes
- University: Swansea University; Cardiff Metropolitan University
- Notable relative: Professor Sian Hope OBE (mother)
- Occupation(s): Medical Student, Rugby Player

Rugby union career
- Position: Prop
- Current team: Gloucester-Hartpury
Senior career
Years	Team	Apps	(Points)
2011-2011	Caernarfon RFC	20	(15)
–	Swansea University RFC		
–	Ospreys		
2020-2023	Gloucester-Hartpury	25	(5)
International career
Years	Team	Apps	(Points)
2018–2023	Wales	27	(0)

Cara Mai Hope (born 24 November 1993) is a Welsh Rugby Union professional player who plays prop for the Wales women's national rugby union team and for Gloucester-Hartpury in the Premier 15s.

Hope announced a hiatus from international rugby in July 2023 on her Instagram, citing the difficulty in balancing her rugby career with her medical career studies at Swansea University Medical School.

== Rugby career ==
=== Club career ===
Hope began playing rugby as a child with the Bangor RFC boys' team, before joining the newly created Bangor RFC girls' team in 2007. In 2011 she moved to Caernarfon Ladies. She has also played for the Ospreys.

Hope signed with her current club, Gloucester-Hartpury, in 2020.

=== International career ===
Cara earned her first cap in the 2018 Women's Six Nations as a second-half replacement in Wales’ third round defeat to Ireland at Donnybrook. She represented Wales at each subsequent Six Nations Championship. She also featured at the 2021 Six Nations Championship.

Hope has won 27 caps in her career to date. She was selected in Wales squad for the 2021 Rugby World Cup in New Zealand.

== Personal life ==
Born in Bangor, Hope attended Ysgol Gynradd Llandegfan and Ysgol David Hughes before joining Cardiff Metropolitan University, where she graduated with an undergraduate degree in sports and exercise science in 2015. In 2018, she graduated from Swansea University with a research-based master's degree in professional practice in healthcare.

Alongside her rugby career, Hope has been a part-time lecturer at Gower College Swansea, and is currently studying medicine at Swansea University Medical School.

Her mother, Professor Siân Hope OBE, was appointed High Sheriff of Gwynedd in 2017.

Hope is in a relationship with former Welsh captain Siwan Lillicrap.
