= This Week (newspaper) =

National tourism newspaper for Wales

THIS WEEK
- Type: Seasonal newspaper
- Format: Tabloid
- Owner(s): Terry Jackson, Steven Potter
- Editor: Roger Thomas
- Founded: 1 August 1988
- Ceased publication: 30 June 2005
- Political alignment: Apolitical
- Headquarters: Cae Rhys, Trawsfynydd, Gwynedd, Wales, UK
- Website: http://www.cottenham.info/cottenham-this-week.html

'THIS WEEK' was the free national tourism newspaper for Wales published between 1988 and 2005, established by Steven Potter and Terry Jackson from Cambridge to provide Local Knowledge Nationwide to visitors. It laid claim to being the first colour tabloid newspaper published in the United Kingdom using new, digital pre-press technology on an Apple Macintosh 512K desktop computer, a claim that remains undisputed. It laid further claim in 1995 to being the first newspaper published online, to extend local knowledge Worldwide using the original Netscape Navigator v1.0 web browser within months of its 14 December 1994 launch.

Despite these early successes, the newspaper faced the same challenge as its elder contemporaries in making well-curated content pay on the World Wide Web while maintaining a traditional print presence, costly by comparison. The last edition of the newspaper appeared in 2005 under its associated Staying in Wales masthead with a new "Insight" magazine supplement featuring The Countryside–Y Cefn Gwlad while THIS WEEK went into hibernation for an indefinite period of time. The newspaper's founders went their separate ways: Steven Potter leaving Wales for London in 1995 to set up LondonTown.com; Terry Jackson remaining in Wales to develop the beta Wales.info open web platform and the newspaper's online presence, realised seventeen years later in 2022 as a new collaborative journalism project.

== History ==
'THIS WEEK' was the brainchild of Steven Potter during the second year of his marketing degree course at Lancaster University. The previous year, having convinced friend and business mentor Terry Jackson that the newly launched Apple Macintosh 512K was essential to his university studies, he arrived at the City of Lancaster with his new possession and Steve Jobs (RIP) as his all-time hero.

Jackson, meanwhile, had bought Cae Rhys farmhouse on three acres of land in the Snowdonia National Park to get away from the rat race and applied for planning permission to convert barn buildings on the land into a residential education centre. This was to be run in conjunction with the Snowdonia National Park Study Centre, and school visits to the Trawsfynydd nuclear power station whose parent company, Magnox Electric, was keen on educating the next generation of energy consumers. Destiny intervened when Potter came to stay at Cae Rhys during the 1988 summer recess, ostensibly to help lay out educational programmes for the new centre on his prized Apple Mac, while Jackson researched opportunities for students to let off steam at visitor attractions in the area.

With planning permission a long way off and by no means certain, and with out-of-date tourist information leaflets spilling out of cupboards and gathering dust in the farmhouse, it was a light-bulb moment for the two protagonists who decided time would be better spent researching an apparent gap in the market for up-to-date information provision to visitors at their destinations in Wales, and the potential for publishing a free newspaper for visitors, vindicated by later research. It also gave Potter a substantial, in-depth project for his marketing degree, which coincided with a report to the Wales Tourist Board in June 1988 of a Study of the Social, Cultural and Linguistic Impact of Tourism in and Upon Wales. Three months later, after Wales Tourist Board research on the information gathering habits of visitors at their destinations revealed only 1% of visitors to Wales read local newspapers because they didn't contain information relevant to their stay, This Week was born with a distribution formula targeting visitors alone, with little leakage into the domestic market and few return copies.

The first North Wales edition was launched in March 1989 by Secretary of State for Wales, Wyn Roberts at Penrhyn Castle, hosted by the National Trust in Wales The front cover featured a specially commissioned watercolour of Fishing Boats at Borth-y-Gest by local Porthmadog artist Rob Piercy The launch attracted much media attention and the newspaper became the subject in 1990 of a BBC TV documentary entitled Into Print, produced by Fleet Street journalist Michael Bywater and still airing occasionally on BBC2.

Regional editions covering Mid Wales, South Wales and West Wales were launched the following year to give national coverage with WYTHNOS YMA, a special Welsh language edition, published annually for the National Eisteddfod of Wales. Trade Mark applications were filed on 24 July 1998 for THIS WEEK and WYTHNOS YMA under Class 16: Newspapers, printed publications and letterheads, all relating to tourism in Wales. The applications were successful and Trade Mark UK00002173032 was entered into the Intellectual Property Register on 7 January 2000. National coverage enabled a series of successful, pan-Wales campaigns with major sponsors and European Regional Development Fund (ERDF) support in partnership with the three Regional Tourism Companies (RTCs) in Wales under contract. When support for the RTCs was withdrawn by the Wales Tourist Board in 2002, the companies struggled to stay in existence; the partnerships were dissolved and they became market competitors with the exception of the South Wales company, which went into voluntary liquidation in 2003. As a result, and with developments hampered by the negative effect on tourism of the 2001/ 2002 foot and mouth outbreak, the newspaper was unable to build on its online investment in Wales and maintain a presence in print at the same time. A final edition was published in 2005 and the online digital assets laid to rest until a new, commercially sustainable, online business model could be conceived based on the five Cs of the new tourism marketplace: Content– Community–Culture–Connectivity–Commerce.

== Content ==
The newspaper's content was a formulaic mix of regional features, news in brief items, comprehensive calendars of seasonal events, and campaigns targeting specific reader groups. Editors were selected based on local knowledge, cultural integrity, journalistic experience and readability, all supported by local area maps, guides and imagery. Electronic layout and typesetting was by QuarkXPress in five columns, three for editorial matter, two for standard format advertising. AGaramond 9pt was adopted as house font, 7pt for closely set events listings, and Bodonoi Bold 56pt for headlines. The THIS WEEK masthead was set in Walbaum Roman 88/ 77pt with the National Tourism Newspaper of Wales strapline set in Frutiger UltraBlack 10.5pt.

=== Masthead ===
The THIS WEEK masthead drew comment from a number of well-meaning critics who felt it at odds with a newspaper starting life as a biweekly (every other week) and later becoming a seasonal, magazine-style news-sheet. This, however, was formula publishing stretched to its logical limits to deliver just-in-time information to a changing readership of visitors staying no longer than a fortnight at their destinations. In fact, the average visitor stay in the 1980s across the traditional fortnightly summer holiday and short breaks at other times of the year was less than a week. THIS WEEK, therefore, became the visitors' week rather than marking a sequential period of time.

=== Maps ===
Prolific use was made of geographic information in laying out the newspaper's editorial, helping readers to navigate pages and locate things of interest on the ground. The development of an early geographic information system using Maps in Minutes facilitated colour map production using more than a hundred different data set layers of information. Maps became a distinguishing feature of the newspaper, giving it a unique selling proposition (USP) that it was able to carry through to online publishing in conjunction with the Taste of Wales/ Blas ar Gymru Campaign. THIS WEEK became an Ordnance Survey licensed development partner to explore new, online mapping applications in particular, but complicated licensing terms stalled any worthwhile developments.

== Campaigns ==
The following newspaper campaigns were designed to enhance visitors' experience at their destinations in Wales; tell stories to friends and family about their visit, and encourage return visits to Wales for holidays and short breaks. Distribution outside Wales was to encourage impromptu decisions to come to Wales.

=== Gerald's North Wales ===
A cartoon strip about Gerald of Wales run in conjunction with Siriol Productions and Cadw to make learning about Wales easy and fun for young visitors.

=== Taste of Wales-Blas ar Gymru ===
A campaign that ran through the entire lifetime of the newspaper from the first edition, which carried a 4-page Taste of Wales pullout supplement. Food and drink became a recurring theme, which, as well as representing the second biggest spend by visitors to Wales after accommodation, was one of the few Welsh 'export' items that visitors could continue to purchase on their return home. Sponsorship from the Welsh Development Agency resulted in advanced, multi-layered, colour location mapping that became the campaign's hallmark, with Cordon Bleu cook Gilli Davies joining the editorial production team.

=== The Four Seasons in North Wales ===
A 1989 limited edition collection of four fine art prints, signed and numbered by North Wales artists, celebrated completion of the first phase of restoration of the Plas Glyn-y-Weddw mansion that housed the Oriel Plas Glyn-y-Weddw Gallery:

1. Spring at Cwm Pennant (watercolour) by Dylan Evans
2. Summer at Dinas Dinlle (watercolour) by Dylan Evans
3. Autumn in Beddgelert (oil) by Gwyneth ap Tomos
4. Winter at Drws-y-Coed (oil) by Gwyneth ap Tomos

=== CC Rover Bus Campaign ===
Public transport also became a recurring theme in the newspaper, aiming to persuade visitors to use scenic bus routes and railways to get around and discover new things to do at their destinations. Sponsorship from Crosville Cymru, later to become absorbed into the Arriva Group, enabled the creation of a fun CC Rover cartoon character whose Designer-Paw-Mark trailed for visitors where to go by bus in North Wales.

=== Yr Iaith Gymraeg–The Welsh Language ===
Useful words and phrases for greetings, eating out and place names.

=== Wales Arts and Culture Campaign ===
A campaign incorporating Project Ffynnon to give Wales a new-media marketing edge for the promotion of Welsh cultural tourism.

=== 150 Things to Do in North Wales ===
Full-colour newspaper centrespreads with hallmark maps and tables showing the location of 150 visitor attractions in North Wales, sponsored by First North Western trains.

=== First North Wales Events ===
The First North Wales Events Campaign promoted festivals and events in North Wales, supported by leaflet distribution and on-train advertising sponsored by First North Western trains. Campaign success was reported in an 18 November 2004 Wales & Borders Trains Press Release, Wales & Borders Trains and quantified using Rail Journey Data in Numbers.

=== Cymru'r Milflwydd; An Eventful Place ===
Supporting the newspaper's Wales Millennium Tourism Showcase at the National Eisteddfod of Wales, Llanelli 2000 by staging the first historic re-enactment to take place on a National Eisteddfod field. The event celebrated the 600th anniversary of the revolt by Owain Glyndŵr on 16 September 1400 when he proclaimed himself Prince of Wales.

=== Wales Holiday Tourism Trails ===
A series of sections covering the twelve topographical areas of Wales, supported by editorial content, tables, maps showing the location of attractions, seasonal What's On listings, local News in Brief items and Readers' Letters.

=== Wales Cymru 2001; Open for Business ===
Newspaper special editions supporting tourism to Wales in the aftermath of the 2001 foot and mouth epidemic. It resulted in the Wales Country Escapades Campaign and introduction of a THIS WEEK Newspaper "Insight" Magazine Supplement to draw visitors back to the countryside.

=== Wales Country Escapades ===
Supporting nineteen tourism regeneration projects in Wales, supported by Adfywio recovery funding from the Wales Tourist Board and Countryside Council for Wales in the wake of the 2001 foot and mouth outbreak.

=== The Countryside–Y Cefn Gwlad ===
Building on the Wales Country Escapades campaign, this was the first featured campaign of the newspaper's new "Insight" Magazine Supplement launched in 2004. It coincided with launch of the Countryside Wales UK website as part of the Wales.info beta web platform development.

=== The Greatest Show in Wales ===
Sponsorship by THIS WEEK of the Wales Tourist Board's Welsh Event of the Year Award, rebranded The Greatest Show in Wales, won in 2000 by the Sesiwn Fawr Dolgellau folk festival, a uniquely Welsh experience for visitors in June to this old Meirionnydd town. The Award was made in the face of stiff competition from a South Wales golfing event, which was heavily tipped to win. The judges were unanimous in considering Sesiwn Fawr Dolgellau to be a celebration of Welsh culture at its best; a prime example of how, via tourism, culture can drive economic growth in a community. The festival sat perfectly within a developing strategy for arts and culture in Wales and was set to emerge onto a wider stage, strengthening rather than foregoing its sense of local identity as it progressed.

=== Sustainable Transport for Tourism Wales ===
Impelled by an urgent need to reduce high-season traffic congestion in tourism honeypot areas of Wales and encouraged by the success of its First North Wales Events Campaign, the newspaper embarked on a national campaign to get visitors out of their cars at destination, reduce their carbon footprint, and help sustain an environment that attracted millions of staying and day visitors to Wales in the first place.

In addition to a comprehensive 1998–2001 Phases 2 Report and a Draft 2007–2011 Phase 3 Strategy Consultation, it resulted in a seminal short paper entitled Infostructure; Sustainable Transport and Tourism, which influenced forward thinking on the rôle of the Internet in future developments.

=== Wales Calendar ===
An online events campaign following publication of The Way Forward in 2000. Launched in 2001, WalesCalendar.com was one of a suite of online products launched by THIS WEEK Wales in conjunction with the Taste of Wales/ Blas as Gymru scheme.

=== It's All On the Web ===
An interactive newspaper/ online campaign celebrating launch on the World Wide Web of the Welsh Development Agency's Taste of Wales-Blas are Gyrmru scheme with online mapping at its core. It marked launch of the first online edition of the newspaper billed as THIS WEEK Interactive. The number 1 online guide for Wales. (see also "Online presence" below).

== Regional titles ==
- THIS WEEK in Clwyd
- THIS WEEK in Meirionnydd
- THIS WEEK Metro
- THIS WEEK in Mid Wales
- THIS WEEK in North Wales
- THIS WEEK in South and West Wales

=== Associated publications ===
- Freedom of Wales
- Insight Magazine Supplement
- On the Waterfront; Where the City Meets the Bay
- Staying in Wales
- WYTHNOS YMA

== Distribution ==
- Visitor accommodation in Wales: bed & breakfast, guest house, hotel, caravan park and campsite.
- Visitor Centres (TICs): England and Wales
- Door-to-door: North West England, The Midlands and Dublin.
- Supermarkets: Asda, Morrisons and Tesco in North West England and The Midlands.
- Filling stations: Shell Filling stations on main routes into Wales.
- National events: National Eisteddfod of Wales, Royal Welsh Show.

=== Readership ===
A, B, C1, C2, D, E demographic

=== National events distribution team ===
- Alan Cunnington
- Phil Evans
- Tommy Graham
- Iwan Jones
- Freddie Tanner

== Newspaper production ==
=== Production team ===
- Publishing chief executive: Terry Jackson
- Group publishing director: Steven Potter
- Market research: Stuart Riley
- Managing editor: Roger Thomas
- Features editor: Brenda Parry
- Food and drink: Gilli Davies
- News in brief: Medwyn Roberts
- Readers letters: Terry Jackson
- Photography: Robert Eames
- Sales and marketing: Jim Embrey
- Advertising executive: Lis Owen-Jones
- Advertising assistant: Paul Lilley
- National events distribution: Phil Evans

=== Contributors ===
- Myrddin ap Dafydd
- John Davies
- Will Edwards
- Mererid Hopwood
- Iwan Llwyd
- Jan Morris
- Charles Quant
- Iorwerth Roberts

=== Sponsors ===
- Cadw
- Countryside Council for Wales
- Crosville Cymru
- First North Western
- National Eisteddfod of Wales
- National Trust in Wales
- RSPB Cymru
- Taste of Wales-Blas ar Gymru
- Wales Tourist Board
- Welsh Development Agency

== Reader surveys ==
A 1999/ 2000 Reader Survey demonstrated the effectiveness of the newspaper in reaching its target readership through a range of distribution outlets in Wales, England and Ireland. It carried a section entitled The Way Forward and a special article on Destination Management Systems entitled A Snapshot from the Middle of a Revolution

A 2001 Online Survey yielded exceptionally fast results, with charts showing reader profiles, their interests and detailed comments.

== Online presence ==
An article entitled The Virtual Wales Tourist appeared in 1995 editions of the newspaper announcing the online presence of THIS WEEK at thisweek.co.uk after release of the Netscape Navigator v1.0 web browser in December 1994. It is believed to be the first online newspaper of its kind.

It was the Taste of Wales/ Blas ar Gymru Campaign, however, that provided the first real opportunity for THIS WEEK to demonstrate the significant advantages the World Wide Web held for Welsh tourism with online interactive mapping at its core. The newspaper's status as an Ordnance Survey licensed development partner would have been key at this stage were it not for licensing problems not resolved until many years later following establishment of the Open Data Institute in 2012 and the UK Geospatial Commission in 2018. Instead, an alliance was formed with Google Maps and a deal brokered by the newspaper for Google's Wales datasets to be brought up to the same standard as those for England. As a result, and following acquisition by the newspaper of the Wales.info national web domain, "Google Maps" was used extensively in the beta Wales.info web platform The platform was constructed to demonstrate proof of concept and validate markets for linked, geospatial data on the World Wide Web. The new Countryside Wales UK website gave an early indication of the newspaper's online direction of travel following publication on the web of the first THIS WEEK WALES interactive online edition in 2005.
