= Eirlys Parri =

Welsh teacher and singer (1950–2024)

- Born: c. 1950
- Died: 29 June 2024 (aged 74)
- Education: Trinity University College
- Known for: Singer
- Spouse: Geraint Eckley

Eirlys Parri (c. 1950 – 29 June 2024) was a Welsh teacher, singer and actress. She was also known by her married name Eirlys Eckley. Her music peaked at its most popular in the 1970s.

== Early life and education ==
Eirlys Parri grew up in Sûn y Môr, Morfa Nefyn, a village on the north coast of the Llŷn Peninsula in Gwynedd, the daughter of John and Mary Parri. She attended Edern Primary School and then Pwllheli Grammar School. Her enjoyed music and singing and had the opportunity to act in Wil Sam's plays with her brother Elis Gwyn.

She went on to Trinity College Carmarthen to study Welsh and Drama with contemporises like Norah Isaac and Carwyn James. She went on teaching practice in Llandudoch, Llanelli and Ysgol y Dderwen Carmarthen.

== Career ==
Yfory - Eirlys Parri (1969)
Eirlys Parri singing "Yfory"

Parri started composing songs and recorded the song "Pedwar Gwynt" in Harri Parri and Gareth Maelor's parlour in Porthmadog. She appeared on the Disc a Dawn television program and travelled Wales to sing at the "Pinaclau Pop" concerts. She started her first job as a teacher at Ysgol Gymraeg Heol Gaer, Flint before getting married and having children.

She continued to sing in concerts across Wales and had the opportunity to act as Mrs Noa in the show Noa with the Welsh Theatre Company and was part of the TV entertainment series Codi Pais. She then moved to Cardiff and went back to college to do a course two days a week on Public Relations and Marketing. She worked for a time in S4C's Public Relations Department then organizing the channel's events, in Wales and in continental Europe. She sang the winning song in the competition Cân i Gymru in 1986. She had her own series Eirlys on S4C, the first series in 1988 and the second in 1989.

By the time her children went to secondary school, she went back to the world of education teaching at Ysgol Heol y Celyn, Pontypridd, and then Ysgol Castellau, y Beddau. She then went to work as a Consultant Teacher for the Cardiff Education Authority. She had retired by 2011.

In 2023, her music was released digitally.

== Personal life ==
She married her husband the actor Geraint Eckley in 1971 and moved to the rural village of Park near Bala, where their daughters, Lois and Esther, were born.

It is also known that she had an affair with a German man while on a business trip and had a baby boy named Mark Ellis Wilson who was born in 1973.

Parri was a speaker of the Welsh language.

Parri died on 29 June 2024 aged 74. She had been in a care home for over five years having been diagnosed with Alzheimer's disease.

== Discography ==
- Eirlys Parry (EP, House On The Rock Records, 1970 )

"Big Bird"
"Four Winds"
"Song of the worlds"
"In The Wind The Graves Are Cooling"

- Blodau'r Grug (Eirlys Parry and Hywel Evans) (EP, Recordiau Sain, SAIN 12, 1970 )

"The Girl And The Moor"
"Island"
"Heather Flowers"
"Porthdinllaen"

- Ti Yw Fy Nghân (EP, Audio Records, SAIN 48, 1974)

"You Are My Song"
"Cynddylan's Room"
"Angry Days"
"Sleep You"

- Cân Y Gobaith (LP, Folk, SYWM 212, 1979 )

"Cân Y Gobaith"
"Rwyf D'Eisiau"
"Huna Blentyn"
"Pam Yr Est"
"Caraf Di"
"Tyrd Fy Nghariad"
"Roedd Yn Y Wlad Honno"
"Atgofion"
"Can Magdalen"
"Hedfan"

- Candle In Light (LP, Audio Records, 1282M, 1983)

"Cannwyll Yn Olau"
"O Pam Yr Est"
"Paid Mynd"
"Torrwr Calonnau"
"Tuag Adre"
"Wylan Wen"
"Pedwar Gwynt"
"Ann Lewis"
"Cerdded Ynghyd"
"Gwin Yn Troi Yn Fy Mhen"
"Dal Fi'n Agos"
"Nos Da"

- Tomorrow (LP, Sound Records, 1349M, 1985)

"Yfory"
"Dadrith"
"Hydref Yn Ei Ôl"
"Cwestiynau"
"Teresa"
"Cerdded Gwynt"
"Dwi'n Nabod O'n Dda"
"Mae'r Garwriaeth Drosodd"
"Ebol Asyn"
"Llithro Mae O Nghafael"
"Dydd Fy Rhyddid"
"Canol Ar Dân"
