= Gary Owen =

Gary Owen is the name of:

== People ==
- Gary Owen (snooker player) (1929–1995), Welsh snooker player
- Gary Owen (politician) (born 1944), Michigan politician
- Gary Owen (footballer) (born 1958), English footballer
- Gary Owen (playwright) (born 1972), Welsh playwright
- Gary Owen (comedian) (born 1974), American comedian

== Other ==
- "Garryowen" (air), Irish quickstep tune, also called "Gary Owen"

== See also ==
- Gary Owens (1934–2015), American disc jockey and voice actor
- Gareth Owen (disambiguation)
- Garryowen (disambiguation)
- Garry Owen (actor) (1902–1951), American actor
- Garry Owens (1945–2022), American activist
