= Stuart Roy =

Wales international rugby union player

- Born: William Stuart Roy; 25 December 1968 (age 57) Ely, England
- Height: 6 ft 6 in (1.98 m)
- Weight: 110 kg (17 st 5 lb)
- School: Ysgol David Hughes
- University: University of Bristol; Cambridge University

Rugby union career
- Position: Lock
Senior career
Years	Team	Apps	(Points)
1988-1997	Cardiff RFC	161	(75)
1997-1998	Pontypridd RFC	29	
1998-99	Newport RFC	21	(0)
International career
Years	Team	Apps	(Points)
1995	Wales	1	(0)

William Stuart Roy (born 25 December 1968) is a former international rugby union player who represented Wales, as well as played in the top division of Welsh club rugby for Cardiff RFC, Pontypridd RFC and Newport RFC. Roy was born in Ely, Cambridgeshire in England, but moved to Anglesey in Wales as a child.

== Rugby career ==
Roy joined Cardiff RFC from Neath RFC for the 1988/89 season. He spent the majority of his playing career at Cardiff, spending nine seasons at the club. During his time there, Cardiff won the SWALEC Cup in 1994 and the Heineken League title in the 1994/95 season.

Roy was included as part of Wales' 1995 Rugby World Cup squad, and made his first and only appearance for the national team in their opening pool match against Japan, coming on as a replacement for Derwyn Jones with around eight minutes of the match remaining. He was included in Wales' squad for the 1998 Five Nations Championship, but remained on the bench and won no further caps.

Roy moved from Cardiff to Pontypridd RFC for the 1997/98 season. He moved clubs again a season later to Newport RFC.

== Medical career ==
Roy studied for a Bachelor of Surgery and Bachelor of Medicine degree from Bristol University and a Master of Philosophy degree in Human Skeletal Biology from Cambridge University. He represented Cambridge University RFC in the 1993 Varsity Match against Oxford University.

Roy works as a Consultant in Trauma and Orthopaedics for the National Health Service at Royal Glamorgan Hospital, Talbot Green. He undertakes private work as part of the Cardiff Sports Orthopaedics partnership.
