= Sesiwn Fawr Dolgellau =

Welsh music festival

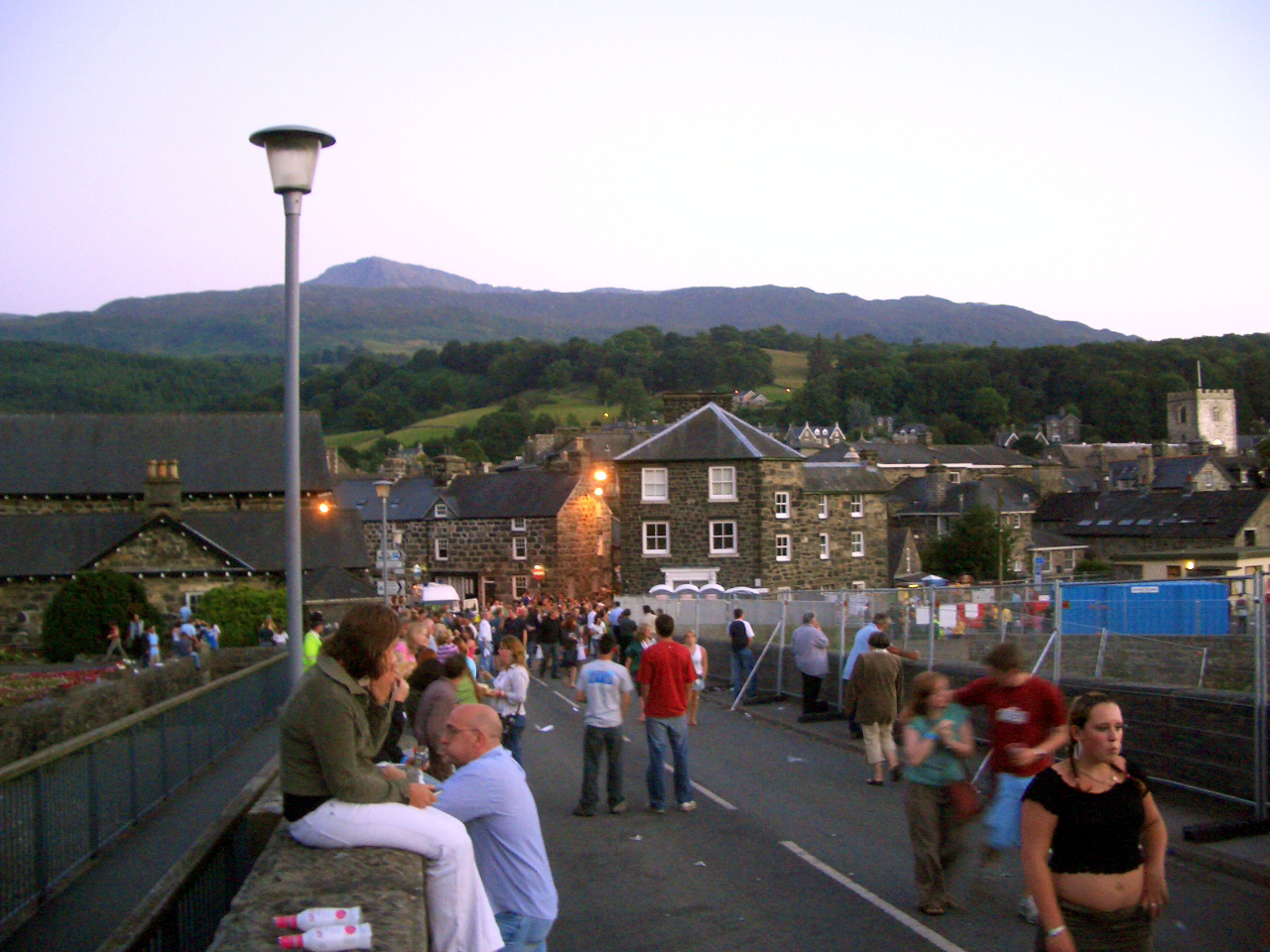
- Dolgellau bridge during Sesiwn Fawr
- Status: Active
- Genre: World music
- Frequency: Annually (July)
- Locations: Dolgellau, Wales
- Inaugurated: 1992
- Website: sesiwnfawr.cymru

Sesiwn Fawr Dolgellau is a world music event held in the town of Dolgellau in Wales. The event was established in 1992 by Ywain Myfyr, Huw Dylan Owen, Esyllt Jones, Elfed ap Gomer and Alun Owen, and was held in the town's streets. From 2002 until 2008, Sesiwn Fawr Dolgellau was held on the Marian Mawr, a large grassy area next to Afon Wnion. It was during this period that Sesiwn Fawr reached its peak audience figures with sell out crowds of approximately 5,000 attending each year. In 2007 and 2008, the festival was blighted by bad weather resulting in poor ticket sales, and as with a number of Welsh festivals, there was no Sesiwn Fawr in 2009.

In 2011, however, Sesiwn Fawr returned to the festival calendar although on a smaller scale than the 2002–08 Sesiwn Fawr and far closer to its early 1990s roots. The organisers decided to return to a primarily folky line-up which included Mynediad am Ddim, Cowbois Rhos Botwnnog, Calan and Steve Eaves. The 2011 Sesiwn Fawr also included a twmpath dawns (a large communal folk dance) on the town's Eldon Square on the following Saturday. After receiving positive reviews, organisers decided to follow a similar format again for 2012.

Since 2012, Sesiwn Fawr has returned to Eldon Square, the festival's spiritual home, introducing bands from Wales, Brittany, Ireland, Scotland and England. During the next few years, organisers explored other venues within the town making use of hidden away court yards, cellar bars and coffee shops, thus rebuilding a festival around Dolgellau's historical architecture.

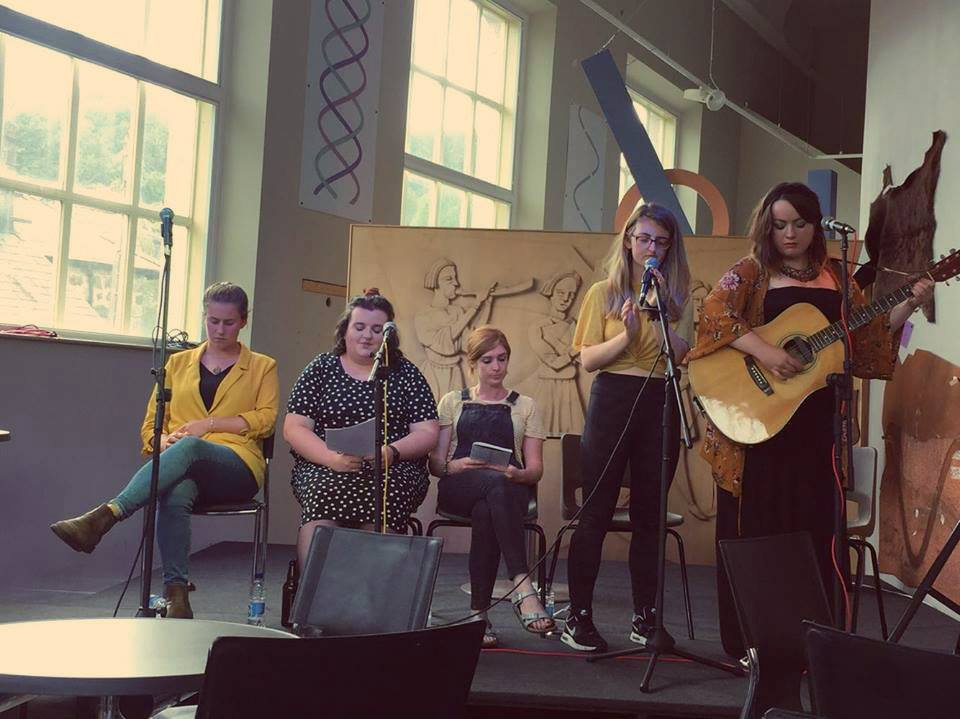
Cywion Cranogwen performing at Dolgellau in 2018

In the past, the line-up has included Super Furry Animals, Steve Earle, The Dubliners Iwcs a Doyle, Burning Spear, Bob Geldof, Saw Doctors, Bryn Fôn, Meic Stevens, Geraint Jarman a'r Cynghaneddwyr, Derwyddon Dr Gonzo, Grupo Fantasma, Paul Dooley, N'Faly Kouyate, Endaf Emlyn, Cerys Matthews and Goldie Lookin Chain.

The folk festival was winner in 2000 of the Wales Tourist Board's Welsh Event of the Year Award, sponsored by This Week, the national tourism newspaper for Wales and rebranded The Greatest Show in Wales
