= Arfon Wyn =

Arfon Wyn (born 1952) is a Welsh singer and songwriter, best known for writing the song Harbwr Diogel ('Safe Harbour') which won Cân i Gymru.

== Early life ==
Arfon Wyn was brought up in Llanfairpwll, Anglesey in and went to school at Ysgol David Hughes, Menai Bridge. He went on to study Theology and Special Education at Bangor University.

== Music career ==
While still at school, Wyn formed a heavy rock band called Yr Atgyfodiad ('The Resurrection'), then whilst at college formed a band called Pererin ('Pilgrim') which had an element of Christian mission. It became popular in the Celtic world, performing regularly in Ireland and Brittany until the late 1980s. Wyn went on to form Y Moniars, hoping to form a Welsh-language equivalent of The Pogues. Y Moniars became busy and popular in Wales during the 1990s.

His song, Harbwr Diogel, won the Cân i Gymru competition in 2002 sung by Elin Fflur.

Wyn was inducted into the white robes of the Gorsedd of Bards, though he resigned his position in August 2016 after the Gorsedd did not honour the Wales national football team at the National Eisteddfod, following the team's success at the UEFA European Championship.

In 2022 he published a book, Cyrraedd yr Harbwr Diogel: Atgofion Drwy Ganeuon ('Reaching the Safe Harbour: Memories through songs') which described the stories behind some of his best known compositions.

During the COVID-19 pandemic lockdown and in subsequent years, Wyn began a project of collecting and repairing old guitars, subsequently donating them to schools on Anglesey.

== Local politics ==
Wyn became a local councillor on Isle of Anglesey County Council, representing the Bro Aberffraw ward for Plaid Cymru since May 2022.
