= Elin Fflur =

Welsh singer-songwriter (born 1984)

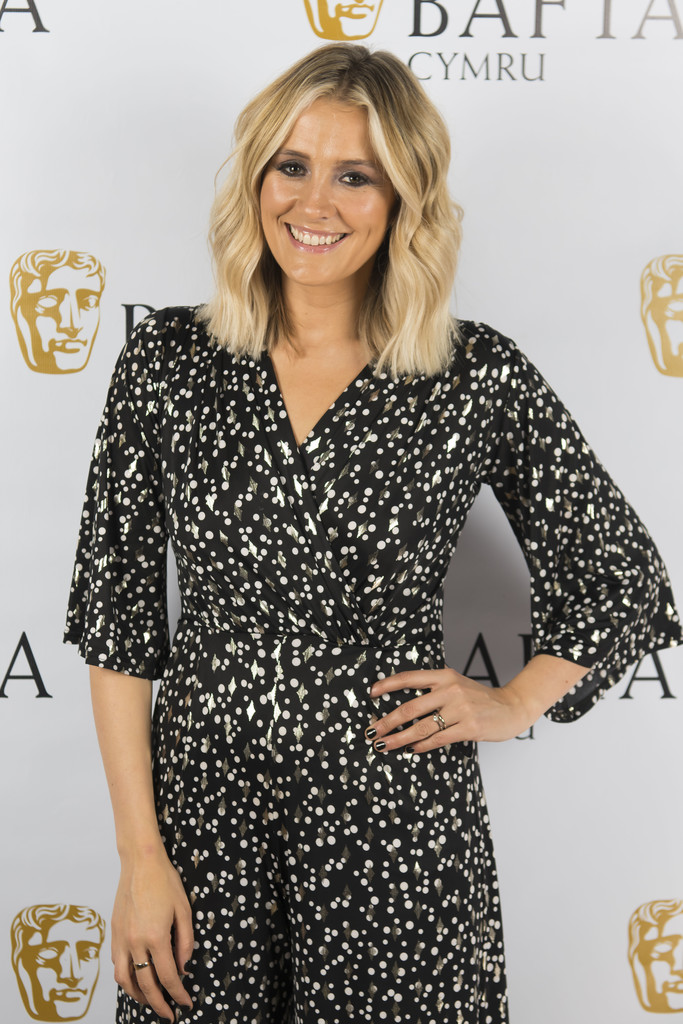
- Fflur at the 2019 BAFTA Cymru Awards
- Born: Elin Fflur Llewelyn Jones; 26 July 1984 (age 41); Llanfairpwllgwyngyll, Anglesey, Wales
- Education: Ysgol David Hughes; Bangor University
- Occupations: Singer; television presenter; radio presenter; voiceover narrator
- Years active: 2002–present
- Television: Cân i Gymru (2011–); Heno (2012–)
- Spouse: Jason Harvey (m. 2012)
- Musical career
- Genres: Pop; Soul
- Instrument: Vocals
- Labels: Recordiau Grawn Ffrwyth; Sain; Jigcal Records

Elin Fflur Llewelyn Harvey (née Jones; born 26 July 1984), known professionally as Elin Fflur, is a Welsh singer-songwriter, television and radio presenter.

== Early life ==
Fflur was born in Llanfairpwllgwyngyll, Anglesey and is the oldest of three children of Gerallt and Nêst Jones. She was educated at Ysgol David Hughes secondary school in the town of Menai Bridge, and later at Bangor University. Fflur began taking part in local Eisteddfodau from the age of three and became a familiar name in National Eisteddfodau thereafter. She later studied criminology at university, but left after her first year.

Her musical roots began with her mother, who was the lead vocalist of the Welsh-folk band Bran in their early, prog-rock releases. The band Bran became known for winning Cân i Gymru in 1978.

== Career ==
Fflur participated in Cân i Gymru in 2002, the 33rd edition of the competition. She won the competition with the song "Harbwr Diogel" ("Safe Bay") composed by Arfon Wyn. She competed again in Cân i Gymru in 2009, but was unsuccessful this time. She was part of bands like Carlotta (with her brother Ioan) and Y Moniars.

She now works as a presenter on S4C, initially on the music roadshow Nodyn, which ran for 4 series between 2008–2011. Since 2011, Fflur has co-presented Cân i Gymru on S4C with Dafydd Meredydd (2011–2013), Gethin Evans (2014) and Trystan Ellis-Morris (2015–present).

In 2012, she became one of the main presenters of the evening magazine programme Heno. She presented her first show on 14 May 2012. Fflur later became an anchor for Welsh annual events such as the Urdd National Eisteddfod, Llangollen International Musical Eisteddfod and the National Eisteddfod of Wales. She has also presented episodes of Noson Lawen.

On 9 September 2018, she took part in an S4C documentary, Chdi, Fi ac IVF, which followed the attempts she and her husband, Jason Harvey, had gone through to conceive a baby using IVF.

In 2018, Fflur stood-in for the BBC Radio Cymru 2 breakfast show when main presenters Dafydd Meredydd and Caryl Parry Jones were absent.

In 2020, she started presenting Sgwrs dan y Lloer ("A conversation under the moonlight"). The series features Fflur meeting with a celebrity guest and having an intimate conversation with them in their own back garden.

== Personal life ==
Fflur has two brothers: Gwion Llŷr Llewelyn and Ioan Llewelyn.

On 15 December 2012, Fflur married Jason Rusell Harvey, a former Llanfairpwll F.C. football player. The couple have spoken openly about their struggles to conceive naturally, and turning their efforts to IVF treatment in an attempt to conceive. Medically, she is unable to conceive naturally as her fallopian tubes are defective.

== Filmography ==
Year	Show	Role	Note
2002	Cân i Gymru	Contestant	Winner
2008–2011	Nodyn	Presenter	4 series
2009	Cân i Gymru	Contestant	
2011–present	Cân i Gymru	Co-presenter	Annually
2012–present	Heno	Co-presenter	
2012–present	Urdd National Eisteddfod	Anchor	Annually
2018	Chdi, Fi ac IVF	Herself	One-off special
2020–present	Sgwrs dan y Lloer	Presenter	4 series
2020–present	Dathlu Dewrder	Co-presenter	

== Discography ==
=== Singles ===
Title	English translation	Length	Release	Notes
Ysbryd Efnisien	Efnisien's ghost	10'24"	2006	
Cerddwn ymlaen	You'll Never Walk Alone	13'00"	2013	Charity single with Lucie Jones and Rhys Meirion
Cloriau Cudd	Hidden covers	07'24"	2014	
Gwely Plu	Feather bed	03'54"	2016	
Hiraeth sy’n gwmni i mi	Nostalgia is my company	03'45"	2017	
Coflaid yr Angel	Angel	11'00"	2018	with Shân Cothi
Enfys	Rainbow	03'39"	2020	Charity single amid the spread of COVID-19
Dwylo Dros y Môr 2020	Hands Across the Sea 2020	04'51"	2020	Charity single; various artists

=== Albums ===
Title	English translation	Length	Release	Notes
Harbwr Diogel	Safe Bay	42'00"	2002	As part of 'Elin Fflur a’r Moniars'
Dim gair	Speechless	51'00"	2003	Debut album, which topped the charts on Radio Cymru.
Cysgodion	Shadows	40'55"	2004	
Hafana	Hafana	52'39"	2008	
Lleuad Llawn	Full moon	43'43"	2014	

=== Compilation albums ===
Title	English translation	Length	Release	Note
Y Goreuon	The Best	73'00"	2010	
