= Ysgol David Hughes =

Secondary school in Anglesey, Wales

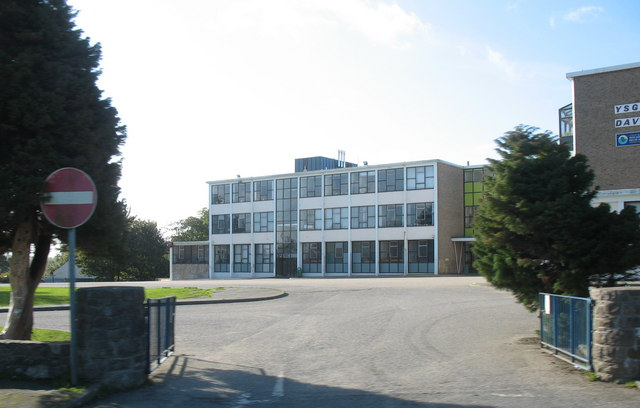

Location
- Ffordd Pentraeth; Menai Bridge, Isle of Anglesey, LL59 5SS; Wales; 53.2282°N 4.1771°W

Information
- Type: Comprehensive
- Motto: Albam exorna (Adorn the white)
- Established: 1603; 423 years ago
- Founder: Sir David Hughes
- Gender: Coeducational
- Age: 11 to 18
- Enrollment: 1118 (2023)
- Houses: Tudur, Seiriol, Llywelyn, Cybi
- Website: ysgoldavidhughes.org

Ysgol David Hughes (meaning: David Hughes School) is a bilingual secondary school on Anglesey, Wales. The school building was completed and opened in Menai Bridge in 1963 by Anglesey County Council which, ten years earlier (in 1953), had become the first education authority in the UK to adopt non-selective comprehensive education.

The new school in Menai Bridge catered for all the secondary pupils in South East Anglesey who up to then had been educated four miles away in Beaumaris, the former county town of Anglesey.

== History ==
=== Beaumaris Grammar School ===
The Welsh name "Ysgol David Hughes" (David Hughes's School), where "ysgol" is the Welsh word for "school", is derived from that of the founder of the original Beaumaris Grammar School established 350 years earlier in the reign of Elizabeth I in 1603. Aside from the nomenclature "Ysgol David Hughes" (now located in Menai Bridge) there is a continuity from the 1603 school to the current iteration, which is described below.

=== Founder of Beaumaris Grammar School ===
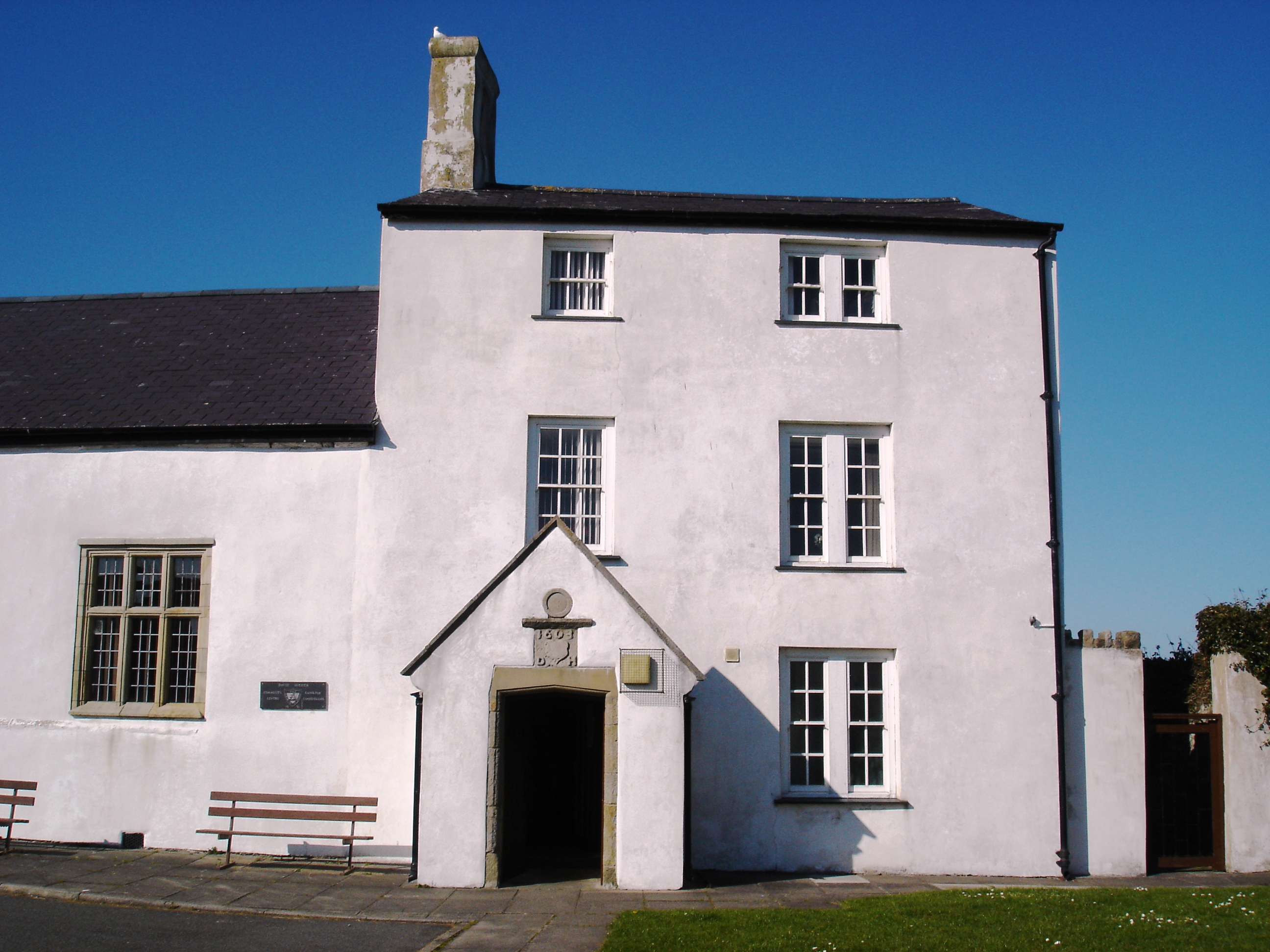
The former Beaumaris Grammar School building, adjacent to Beaumaris Castle. The 1603 date can be seen above the door

Contained in the papers of Christopher Wase (now held at Corpus Christi College, Oxford), it states that David Hughes attended Magdalene College, Cambridge. He was appointed 'Tutor to a person of Qualitie who conferred upon him liberal Gratuities & settled upon him a Large Annuitie'. Hughes later lived in Norfolk and used his good fortune to build a 'considerable estate in money which afterwards hee left in his last Will & Testament for the Founding & Endowing of a Free School & Hospitall in & near Bowmaris [sic]'. Hughes procured a building in Beaumaris which was converted and opened as a Free Grammar School in 1603.

In a will, Hughes vested its administration in a body of feoffees (trustees) which he specified, should always include the Bishop of Bangor. He also laid down the terms on which "fellowships" (scholarships) should be established to enable deserving pupils to proceed directly from Beaumaris to the University of Oxford. In 1895 the management of the David Hughes charitable endowment (which had funded Beaumaris Grammar School) was transferred from the feoffees to Anglesey's new "County Governing Body" which now used the funds for the establishment of new county schools at Holyhead, Llangefni and Amlwch as well continuing to provide a proportion of funding for Beaumaris Grammar School.

=== 20th-century ===
In 1953 the ancient Beaumaris Grammar School was combined with Beaumaris Secondary Modern School to become "Beaumaris Comprehensive School" following the Anglesey Council's decision to abolish the tripartite system, becoming the first local education authority to do so. When plans were announced to move the entire school away from Beaumaris to Menai Bridge there was considerable opposition from the people of Beaumaris to what they considered to be the arbitrary closure of their old school and the end of the centuries-old tradition of secondary education in the town.

== Facilities ==
Ysgol David Hughes at Menai Bridge is divided into five blocks, A-D and New Block. It has a new sports hall with a fitness room with views of the Menai Strait and Snowdonia. The facility is open to the public in the evenings. There are approximately 1250 pupils at the school, from ages 11 to 18. The school is at the top end of Menai Bridge and has views of both the Menai Suspension Bridge and Britannia Bridge. As of September 2024, Mrs Mari Roberts has taken over from Mr H Emyr Williams as headmistress.

== Welsh language ==
Welsh Government defines the school as a bilingual secondary school Category 2B, which means that, at least 80% of subjects (excluding Welsh and English) are taught through the medium of Welsh but are also taught through the medium of English. Most pupils received their primary education through the medium of Welsh.

According to the latest Estyn inspection report in 2025, 54.4% of all pupils spoke Welsh at home. 40.4% of all pupils spoke Welsh at home in 2017.

== Notable former pupils ==
- Tecwyn Roberts, NASA’s first Flight Dynamics Officer and later Director of Networks at Goddard Space Flight Center.
- Matthew Maynard, cricketer
- Aled Jones, singer and presenter
- Louise Elliott, journalist, and TV and radio presenter
- Dafydd Ieuan, musician and member of the Super Furry Animals
- Cian Ciaran, musician and member of the Super Furry Animals
- Arthur Emyr, former Wales Rugby international
- Wayne Hennessey, Wales Football international.
- Elin Fflur, singer
- Rhun ap Iorwerth, leader of Plaid Cymru, journalist and first minister of Wales.
- Stuart Andrew, Conservative MP
- Nathan Gill, ex-Leader of UKIP Wales, ex-leader of Reform UK Wales.
- Howel Harris Hughes, theologian and Principal of the United Theological College in Aberystwyth.
- Huw Garmon, actor
- Sir Andrew Cahn, former CE of UK Trade and Investment
- Stuart Roy, former Welsh Rugby International and an orthopaedic surgeon.
- Cara Hope, Wales rugby union international player.
- Lois Medi, poet

== Bibliography ==
- David Hughes M.A. and his Free Grammar School at Beaumaris, 1864, reissued (ed. by Vaughan Bowen) 1933
- E. Madoc Jones, ‘The Free Grammar School of Beaumaris’ in Trans. Angl. Antiq. Soc., 1922;
