= Bridget Anne Emmett =

British ecologist and academic

Bridget Emmett OBE
- Education: University of Exeter; Bangor University; University of Aberdeen
- Scientific career
- Thesis: The effects of harvesting on soil nitrogen transformations in a Sitka spruce (Picea sitchensis (Bong.) Carr.) plantation at Beddgelert forest (N. Wales) (1989)

Bridget Emmett OBE is a British ecologist, professor and science area head for the UK Centre for Ecology & Hydrology. She is the president of British Ecological Society from 2024.

== Early life and education ==
Emmett studied plant sciences at the University of Aberdeen. She moved to the University of Exeter as a doctoral researcher, where she studied the impact of harvesting on soil nitrogen transformation.

== Research and career ==
Emmett believes that soils is one of the “most underrated and little understood wonders on our fragile planet,”. Since 2001 Emmett has led the Solis and Land Use Science Area at the UK Centre for Ecology & Hydrology. Her research considers soils, ecology and biogeochemistry. She worked as an advisor to the Government of the United Kingdom, providing insight on soil health.

From 2024 Emmett served as President of the British Ecological Society. She is one of the nine experts that advised the British Ecological Society on the future of ecological research. In 2025 Emmett was elected a Fellow of the British Ecological Society.

== Awards and honours ==
- 2015 Elected Fellow of the Learned Society of Wales
- 2016 Marsh Award for Climate Change Research
- 2022 Appointed to the Order of the British Empire

== Select publications ==
- R Bobbink; K Hicks; James M. Galloway; et al. (1 January 2010). "Global assessment of nitrogen deposition effects on terrestrial plant diversity: a synthesis". Ecological Applications. 20 (1): 30–59. doi:10.1890/08-1140.1. ISSN 1051-0761. PMID 20349829. Wikidata Q33547102.
- Knute J. Nadelhoffer; Bridget A. Emmett; Per Gundersen; O. Janne Kjønaas; Chris J. Koopmans; Patrick Schleppi; Albert Tietema; Richard F. Wright (March 1999). "Nitrogen deposition makes a minor contribution to carbon sequestration in temperate forests". Nature. 398 (6723): 145–148. doi:10.1038/18205. ISSN 1476-4687. Wikidata Q58380312.
- T W Crowther; K E O Todd-Brown; C W Rowe; et al. (1 November 2016). "Quantifying global soil carbon losses in response to warming". Nature. 540 (7631): 104–108. doi:10.1038/nature20150. ISSN 1476-4687. PMID 27905442. Wikidata Q31146293.
