= Geraint Griffiths =

Welsh singer-songwriter and actor

Geraint Griffiths (born 1949) is a Welsh singer-songwriter and actor. He works mainly in the Welsh language.

== Early life and education ==
Born in Pontrhydyfen, Griffiths attended Pontrhydyfen Primary school and then moved across to Ysgol Gymraeg Pontrhydyfen when it opened. In 1960 he attended Glan Afan Grammar Technical School in Port Talbot (later Glan Afan Comprehensive School). In 1966 he left to study nursing at The Prince of Wales Orthopaedic Hospital, Rhydlafar, and later at West Wales General Hospital, Carmarthen, and at Saint George's Hospital, London.

== Career ==
Griffiths started his recording career as a session musician with Welsh language bands Hergest and Edward H Dafis. In 1976 he returned to Wales to join the short lived band Injaroc, leaving one album Halen Y Ddaear. In 1978 he formed the Welsh language rock band Eliffant. The band recorded two albums on the Sain label and a single on the band's own label, "Llef". In 1985 he started his professional career with his own six part television series on S4C, Nol Ar Y Stryd (Back On The Street). He released several albums of his compositions on the Sain label as a solo artist.

== Recordings ==
- M.O.M. (1979) with the band Eliffant.
- Gwin Y Gwan (1980) with the band Eliffant.
- Madras (1984)
- Rebel (1986)
- Ararat (1988)
- Blynyddoedd Sain 1977-1988 (1997) Compilation.
- Eliffant (2001) Compilation.
- Cadw'r Ffydd (2003) Compilation.

He recorded the Welsh language rock version of Handel's Messiah -Teilwng Yw'r Oen in 1984. He founded his own record label, Diwedd Y Gwt, in 1992. He has released several albums on this label.

- Donegal (1992)
- Hewl (1999)
- Glastir (2001)
- Miya-Jima (2005)
- Clwb Dydd Sadwrn (2007)
- Havana (2007)
- Brooklyn (2017)

== Films ==
- Y Cloc (1986) Endaf Emlyn
- Ffair Roc (1986) Richard Powelko
- Fel Dail Ar Bren (1987) David Lyn
- Derfydd Aur (1989) Paul Turner
- Nel (1990) Richard Lewis
- Sant Mewn Storm (1994)
- The Proposition (1996) Strathford Hamilton
- Dirgelwch Yr Ogof (2002) Endaf Emlyn

== Bibliography ==
- Geraint Davies & John Davies, HEWL: STORI GERAINT GRIFFITHS, Gomer; ISBN 1-84323-604-4, 2005
