= Côr Cymru =

- Genre: Talent show
- Presented by: Aled Jones (2003); Nia Roberts (2005–2007); Heledd Cynwal (2009–2024)
- Starring: Heledd Cynwal (2003); Gareth Owen (2005–2007); Morgan Jones (2009–2024)
- Country of origin: Wales
- Original language: Welsh
- No. of series: 11

Production
- Production locations: The Great Hall, Aberystwyth Arts Centre
- Running time: 60 minutes
- Production companies: Opus (2003–2007); Rondo Media (2009–2024)

Original release
- Network: S4C
- Release: 1 March 2003 – 12 May 2024

Related
- Last Choir Standing

Côr Cymru (Choir of Wales) is a Welsh music competition television that was broadcast by S4C. Held biennially, the series featured choirs from across the country competing for a chance to be named the titular "choir of Wales".

The first series was presented by Aled Jones and Heledd Cynwal in 2003, but subsequent series have been fronted by Nia Roberts and Gareth Owen.

In July 2025, S4C cancelled the series, with no explanation given. The decision was criticised by figures such as Cefin Roberts of Ysgol Glanaethwy. The chief executive of the production company, Rondo, said that they were "extremely proud of Côr Cymru and what it has achieved" but that the decision was disappointing.

== Format ==
The show sees choirs competing against each other in knockout-style semi finals in five different categories (female voice, male voice, mixed, youth (16–25 years), and children's choirs). The winners in each category then compete in the live final for the grand title of "Choir of Wales".

The winner of the 2017 edition additionally represented Wales at the inaugural Eurovision Choir of the Year competition.

== Winners ==
Year	Choir	Category
2003	The Ceredigion School of Music	Youth
2005	Serendipity	Mixed
2007	Cywair	Mixed
2009	The Ceredigion School of Music	Children
2011	Cywair	Mixed
2013	Côr Y Wiber	Women
2015	Côr Heol y March	Children
2017	Côr Merched Sir Gâr	Youth
2019	Ysgol Gerdd Ceredigion	Youth
2022	Côrdydd	Mixed
2024	Côr Ifor Bach	Youth

Best conductor award
2007: Mari Pritchard: Côr Ieuenctid Môn (Anglesey Youth Choir)
2009: Sioned James: Côrdydd, Cardiff
2011: Islwyn Evans, Cywair
2013: Aled Phillips, Côr Meibion Rhosllannerchrugog (men)
2015: Janet Jones, Parti Llwchwr
2017: Eilir Owen Griffiths, CF1
2019: Mari Pritchard, Anglesey Youth Choir

Viewers' choice award
2011: Cantata, Llanelli (women)
2013: Côr y Cym (youth)
2015: Parti Llwchwr (women)
2017: Côr Ieuenctid Môn
2019: Côr Sioe Môn

Côr Cymru Cynradd (for primary school choirs)
2015: Ysgol Iolo Morganwg
2017: Ysgol Pen Barras
2019: Ysgol Teilo Sant

== See also ==
- Last Choir Standing, a similar BBC series broadcast in 2008
