= Lowri Morgan =

Welsh television presenter and marathon runner

Lowri Morgan (born 29 January 1975) is a Welsh television presenter, adventurer and ultra marathon runner. She has presented S4C's coverage of the World Rally Championship, BBC's Rugby flagship show Scrum V and the magazine show Uned 5. Morgan is one of a handful of athlete to have completed the notoriously difficult 350-mile 6633 Ultra in the Arctic and the Amazon Ultra Marathon which were both filmed for documentaries. She has also visited the site of RMS Titanic for a television documentary.

== Biography ==
Morgan is originally from Gowerton in Swansea Wales and was educated at Ysgol Gyfun Gŵyr. She was also a track and field runner and was part of the Swansea Harriers Athletics Club and ran in 1500 meters events. Morgan attended Cardiff University and studied music. Morgan played right-wing on the university's rugby team having been called on to replace an injured player. She played on the Welsh national women's team but pulled her cruciate ligaments out of her tibia and doctors had to remove a torn knee cartridge, causing her to spend the next year using a wheelchair.

She went on to have a career in television. Morgan is the presenter of S4C's coverage of the World Rally Championship and is the current host of the ITV television series Helimeds. She also presented the teenage-magazine programme Uned 5, with one of its features showing her becoming one of 80 people to travel to the wreck of RMS Titanic. In 2004, she visited the wreck of HMS Oxford for a documentary called Chwilio am Long Harry Morgan. Morgan was also recently featured in the new podcast series from Rebel Girls based on the book Goodnight Stories for Rebel Girls and narrated the episode titled “Aisholpan Nurgaiv“

Morgan has taken part in Ultra Marathons, including the Amazon Marathon and the 350-mile 6633 Arctic Marathon. She was one of six people to have completed the Amazon Marathon. In the latter marathon, Morgan was affected by stress fractures on her feet, and was required to use crutches. She was the sole finisher of the marathon as several of her competitors withdrew three days before it ended. The events were filmed for the documentary series Ras yn Erbyn Amser with Morgan as the producer. Both series won several awards which include the Celtic Media Festival's highest accolade and Morgan was awarded the Best Presenter at the 2012 BAFTA Cymru Awards and Best Documentary Series.

== Personal life ==
Morgan is married to Sion Jones, who also works in television. She has one child. Morgan was previously a member of The National Youth Choir and of the Orchestra of Wales. She was made an Honorary Fellowship and was awarded an master's degree from Swansea University in July 2012.
