= Gareth Owen (presenter) =

Gareth Owen (born 1984) is a Welsh TV Presenter best known for co-hosting flagship youth Magazine show Uned 5 between 2002 and 2005 with Gethin Jones and Lisa Gwilym.

After his three-year stint on Uned 5, he became a regular face for S4C's coverage of major Welsh festivals such as Urdd Gobaith Cymru and the National Eisteddfod, and currently fronts Côr Cymru (a high-profile search for the best choir in Wales) for the channel every two years.
