= Derwyddon Dr Gonzo =

Welsh-language funk and ska band with chart success

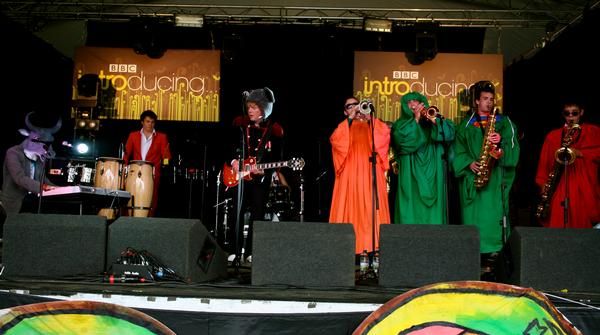
- From left to right: Ifan Dafydd, Ifan Jams, Ifan Tomos, Cai Dyfan (rear), Sion Garth, Berwyn Jones, Dafydd Meirion, Morys Williams, performing at the Latitude Festival, 2008

Background information
- Origin: Llanrug, Wales
- Genres: Funk, Ska, Afro-beat
- Years active: 2005–2011
- Label: Copa (Sain Wales)
- Members: Ifan Tomos – Rhythm Guitar, Vocals; Llion Gethin – Lead Guitar; Ifan Dafydd – Keyboards; Cai Dyfan – Drums; Dewi Foulkes – Bass; Ifan Jams – Percussion, Rapping; Berwyn Jones – Trumpet; Sion Garth – Cornet; Dafydd Meirion – Tenor Sax; Morys Williams – Baritone Sax
- Website: Official site

Derwyddon Dr Gonzo were a Welsh-language funk and ska band from Llanrug, North Wales. Having reached number one in Siart C2 (Welsh Language Music Chart), their music received airplay on BBC Radio Cymru, BBC Radio 1 and Serbian radio. The band performed regularly on the Welsh language scene circuit, in addition to larger festivals such as Latitude Festival, Wakestock, Sŵn, Sesiwn Fawr Dolgellau and Maes B at the National Eisteddfod.

Their second EP, Chaviach/Bwthyn was released on the Copa Label in 2008. On 27 July 2009 the band released their second album, Stonk!, on the Copa label, and recorded at the Wings for Jesus Studio in Cardiff by Sir Doufus Styles.

The band broke up in 2011, playing a final gig in Clwb Ifor Bach. Ifan Tomos stated that they were "a terribly lazy band" that "weren't writing enough songs."

== Discography ==
- Ffandango (2006)
- K.O/Madrach (Ciwdod, 2007)
- Chaviach/Bwthyn (Copa, 2008)
- Stonk! (Copa, 2009)

== Awards ==
- Winners of Cymdeithas yr Iaith Gymraeg's Battle of the Bands competition in 2005
- Best Live Band - Rock & Pop Awards, BBC Radio Cymru 2009
- Best Band - Rock & Pop Awards, BBC Radio Cymru 2009
