= Iwcs a Doyle =

Welsh band

Iwcs a Doyle were a popular Welsh-language two-piece band.

Iwan "Iwcs" Roberts and John Doyle formed the duo Iwcs a Doyle in 1995. They rose to fame following their success with the song “Cerrig yr Afon” in the annually held “Cân i Gymru” (Song for Wales) competition in 1996. The pair recorded an album entitled “Edrychiad Cynta’”, which was released in early 1997. The album was an overwhelming success on the Welsh music scene, spending over a year at number one in the Radio Cymru charts. Described as "one of the most promising duos ever", Iwcs a Doyle travelled and gigged extensively throughout 1997 and 1998, playing in theatres and pubs across the length and breadth of Wales. Their musical style is that of an acoustic folk/pop, with strong memorable guitar pieces by Doyle, which merged into a funk style on occasions.

== Discography ==
- Edrychiad Cynta - Sain 2147, 1997
