= Nia Roberts (presenter) =

Welsh radio and television presenter

Nia Roberts is a Welsh radio and television presenter.

== Early life ==
Roberts was born to Mabel (d. 1996) and J.O. Roberts (d. 2016), a Welsh actor, and was raised in the village of Benllech on Anglesey. Her brother is the television presenter Gareth Roberts.

== Career ==
She is a regular presenter on Welsh television channel S4C, fronting competitions, festivals and shows including her own chat show Nia. Her television credits include presenting prime-time search for the best choir in Wales, Côr Cymru and the arts & culture programme Pethe. She has been a regular presenter of coverage of the National Eisteddfod of Wales. Since 2015 she has presented the S4C quiz Celwydd Noeth (Blatant Lie).

She hosted her own weekday morning magazine programme for BBC Radio Cymru moving to the afternoon in 2012, but the programme came to end in December 2013 after a new schedule was introduced. Since then she has presented the weekly arts programme Stiwdio.

She was inducted into the Gorsedd of Bards at the 2017 National Eisteddfod, which took place on Anglesey.

== Personal life ==
Roberts lives in Cowbridge with her husband Geraint and has two daughters, Nel and Cesia, who both speak fluent Welsh and English.

She was previously known as Nia Chiswell while married to singer and TV producer Huw Chiswell.
