= Plethyn =

Plethyn is a Welsh language folk music group that was at their zenith between 1978 and 1995. The members are Linda Healy, Roy Griffiths and John Gittins. The three members originate from near Meifod, Montgomeryshire, in mid-Wales. Roy Griffiths and Linda Griffiths are brother and sister, while Gittins was born on a neighbouring farm.

They specialise in the close harmonies of the plygain tradition. Most of their songs are arrangements of traditional songs, but some of them are new, often including lyrics by Myrddin ap Dafydd. Elfed Lewys had a significant influence on the group when he came to the area as a minister. On earlier recordings they accompany themselves on guitar, mandolin, whistle and accordion; on later recordings they are joined by other instrumentalists.

Plethyn is the Welsh word for "braid", "plait" (as in three strands) or "bond".

== Discography ==
=== Albums ===
- Blas y Pridd
- Golau Tan Gwmwl
- Rhown Garreg ar Garreg
- Byw a Bod
- Drws Agored
- Teulu'r Tir
- Caneuon Gwerin i Blant
- Seidir Ddoe

=== Compilations ===
- Blas y Pridd/Golau Tan Gwmwl
- Goreuon Plethyn (2003)
