= Pan Celtic Festival =

Celtic-language music festival

Pan Celtic Festival Féile Pan Cheilteach
- Logos of the Pan Celtic Festival
- Genre: Celtic culture and music festival
- Location: Ireland
- Years active: 1971–present
- Founders: Con O'Connaill
- Website: www.panceltic.ie

The Pan Celtic Festival (Irish: Féile Pan Cheilteach; Scottish Gaelic: Fèis Pan-Cheilteach; Manx: Feailley Pan-Cheltiagh; Welsh: Gŵyl Ban-Geltaidd; Breton: Gouel Hollgeltiek; Cornish: Gool Keskeltek) is a Celtic-language and culture festival held annually in Ireland, since its inauguration in 1971. Its main aim is to promote the modern Celtic languages and cultures and artists from the six Celtic nations: Brittany, Cornwall, Ireland, Isle of Man, Scotland and Wales.

Each participating nation holds its own national selection event to choose its representatives for the Festival. The festival includes many competitions and events involving the arts, such as singing, dancing, choiring, songwriting, instrument playing, and film making. Often the most reported-on event of the Pan Celtic Festival is the International Song Contest, a competition for newly composed songs in the celtic languages, formerly called the Celtavision Song Contest in the seventies and eighties.

== Origins and history ==
The six Celtic nations, as recognised by the Celtic League: Republic of Ireland and Northern Ireland Scotland Isle of Man Wales Cornwall Brittany

Formed in Killarney, County Kerry, Ireland, the Pan Celtic Festival was organised as a music festival to be held every Spring, to promote the modern cultures and Celtic languages through the medium of music. It was originally entitled Gŵyl Gerdd Bach (Welsh for "Small Music Festival"), by Con O'Connaill, but later changed to its current name. In May 1971, the first festival took place in Killarney; and featured performers from Wales (Phyllis and Meredydd Evans), Ireland (Scoil na Toirbhirte), and Brittany (Les Tregerez Group and Alan Stivell).

Meredydd Evans engaged in discussions with the event organiser, Ó Connaill, following the 1971 Festival, and invited him to the National Eisteddfod of Wales. At the Eisteddfod, Ó Connaill met members from other Celtic nations, and formed a committee for the Pan Celtic Festival. Participants from the six Celtic nations of Brittany (Breizh), Cornwall (Kernow), Wales (Cymru), Scotland (Alba), Ireland (Éire) and the Isle of Man (Mannin) took part in the second Pan Celtic Festival, again held in Killarney in 1972. It was during this festival that the core structure of the event was finalised following a meeting with committee members. These principles of the event are to promote the languages, musical talents and cultures within the six territories recognised as Celtic nations.

== Participation ==
Eligibility to compete at the Pan Celtic Festival is for Celtic nations, which are territories in Northern and Western Europe where Celtic languages or cultural traits have survived, and are members of the Celtic League. The term "nation" is used in its original sense to mean a community of people who share a common identity and culture and are identified with a traditional territory. It is not synonymous with "sovereign state".

| Nation | Celtic name | Debut year |
|---|---|---|
| Brittany | Breizh | 1971 |
| Cornwall | Kernow | 1972 |
| Ireland | Éire | 1971 |
| Isle of Man | Mannin | 1972 |
| Scotland | Alba | 1972 |
| Wales | Cymru | 1971 |

== National selections ==
=== Brittany: Gouelioù Etrekeltiek An Oriant ===
The Gouelioù Etrekeltiek An Orient (English: Inter-Celtic Festival of Lorient, or French: Festival Interceltique de Lorient) is an annual Celtic festival, located in the city of Lorient, Brittany, France. The event also acts as a national selection process to determine the Breton representative for the annual Pan Celtic Festival. It was founded in 1971 by Polig Montjarret. This annual festival takes place every August and is dedicated to the cultural traditions of the Celtic nations (pays celtes in Brittany), highlighting celtic music and dance and also including other arts such as painting, photography, theatre, sculpture, traditional artisan as well as sport and gastronomy.

=== Cornwall: Kan Rag Kernow ===
Kan Rag Kernow (English: A Song for Cornwall) is a Cornish annual song contest to find a representative for Cornwall at the Pan Celtic Festival, held annually in Ireland.

Cornwall's entry in 2000, Rachel with Common Ground, won the competition with maximum marks from five of the six voting countries. The song, Tir Kemmyn (English: Common Ground), was written by Terry Wallwork and had been chosen from 34 entries at a Pirate FM event in Penzance in March that year.

The Cornish group, The Changing Room, won the 2015 Kan Rag Kernow on 30 January 2015. The group went on to represent Cornwall at the 2015 Pan Celtic Festival, finishing in first place with the song "Hal an Tow" (Flora Day).

Cornwall did not participate in the 2025 contest.

=== Ireland: Comórtas Amhrán Náisiúnta ===
The Comórtas Amhrán Náisiúnta (English: National Song Contest) is the Irish selection process to determine the representatives for Ireland at the annual Pan Celtic Festival. In 2025, the selection was held at the GB Shaw Theatre, in Carlow, on the 25th of January. The 2025 selection winner, Gráinne Ní Fhátharta, had previously won the 2020 selection but the Pan Celtic Festival 2020 was cancelled due to Covid-19.

=== Isle of Man: Arrane son Mannin ===
The Arrane son Mannin (English: Song for the Isle of Man) is the Manx competition through which a song is selected for the Pan Celtic Festival. In 2025, Sue Harrison & Rob Middleton were chosen to represent the island.

=== Scotland: Am Mòd Nàiseanta Rìoghail ===
Am Mòd Nàiseanta Rìoghail (English: The Royal National Mòd) has previously been used as the Scottish Gaelic selection process, organised by An Comunn Gàidhealach, to find the Scottish representative for the Pan Celtic Festival, held annually in Ireland. The Scottish band, Na h-Òganaich, were the first representatives for Scotland at the 1971 Pan Celtic Festival. They represented Scotland again in 1972, with the song "Mi le m’Uillin", finishing in first place.

As of 2025, entries are selected by Fèis Pan Cheilteach – Alba, the Scottish organising committee for the Pan Celtic Festival.

=== Wales: Cân i Gymru ===
Cân i Gymru (English: A Song for Wales, Welsh pronunciation: [ˈkaːn i ˈɡəmrɨ]) is a Welsh television show broadcast on S4C annually. It was first introduced in 1969 when BBC Cymru wanted to enter the Eurovision Song Contest. It has taken place every year since, except in 1973. Cân i Gymru is different from most talent shows; whereas the majority invite the public to participate, Cân i Gymru welcomes only professional artists. The winner of the contest represents Wales at the annual Pan Celtic Festival held in Ireland and is also awarded a cash prize.

Wales made their debut participation in the Eurovision Choir of the Year 2017, which marked the second time in any of the Eurovision Family of Events that the country was not represented as part of the unified state of the United Kingdom, after 1994, when Wales participated lastly in the Jeux Sans Frontières. Wales used the talent show Côr Cymru, to select their representatives.

== Festival hosts ==
Locations of the towns and cities in Ireland who have hosted the Pan Celtic Festival.

The festivals, since 1971, have been held in various towns and cities in Ireland. Below is a list of the host cities and their respective years of hosting. The 2001 festival was cancelled due to the foot-and-mouth outbreak. As is shown below, County Kerry have hosted the festival twenty-nine times since 1971, with the most recent the 2011 Festival, in the town of Dingle, who first hosted the event in 2010. County Clare have only hosted once in 1997.

| Festivals | Irish county | Location | Years |
|---|---|---|---|
| 29 | County Kerry | Killarney | 1971–1990 |
| 29 | County Kerry | Tralee | 1995–1996, 1998–2000, 2004–2005 |
| 29 | County Kerry | Dingle | 2010–2011 |
| 8 | County Carlow | Carlow | 2012–2013, 2016–2017, 2023–2026 |
| 6 | County Donegal | Letterkenny | 2006–2007, 2018–2019 |
| 6 | County Donegal | Donegal | 2008–2009 |
| 4 | County Galway | Galway | 1991–1994 |
| 2 | County Kilkenny | Kilkenny | 2002–2003 |
| 2 | County Londonderry | Derry | 2014–2015 |
| 1 | County Clare | Ennis | 1997 |

== List of winners ==
=== By year ===
The table below lists all of the winners of the Pan Celtic International Song Contest since 1971. Wales is the most successful nation to date, with eighteen wins; Ireland has thirteen wins; Cornwall has eleven wins; Scotland has eight wins; Brittany has three wins; and the Isle of Man has only won once.

Pan Celtic International Song Contest winners
| Year | Nation | Artist | Song | Songwriter(s) | Cit. |
|---|---|---|---|---|---|
| 1971 | Ireland | Scoil na Toirbhirte | "Tomás MacCurtain" | | |
| 1972 | Scotland | Na h-Òganaich | "Mi le m' uillin" | Murdo MacFarlane | |
| 1973 | Ireland | Margaret O'Brein | "Goirm thú" | | |
| 1974 | Wales | Iris Williams | "I gael Cymru yn Gymru'n rydd" | Rod Thomas, Robin Griffith | |
| 1974 | Ireland | MacMurrough | "Cuan bhaile na cúirte" | Paul Kavanagh, Mary Kavanagh, Josephine O'Neill | |
| 1975 | Wales | Bran | "Caled fwlch" | Gwyndaf Meirion | |
| 1976 | Scotland | Mary Sandeman | "Thoir dhomh do làmh" | John MacLeod, Eric Spence | |
| 1977 | Brittany | Kyaldan | "Breizh" | Alain Samson, Arz Mael | |
| 1978 | Brittany | Gouelia | "Korn-bout" | | |
| 1979 | Scotland | Margaret MacLeod | "An lon dubh" | Margaret MacLeod | |
| 1980 | Ireland | Dermot O'Brien | "Neansaí" | Dermot O'Brien | |
| 1981 | Scotland | Kathleen MacDonald | "Òran do cheit" | Angus Anderson, Pat Anderson | |
| 1982 | Wales | Bando | "Nid llwynog oedd yr haul" | Geraint Lovgreen, Myrddin ap Dafydd | |
| 1983 | Scotland | Mary MacInnis | "Nam aonar le mo smaointean" | John MacLeod, Eric Spence | |
| 1984 | Cornwall | Ragamuffin | "An wrannen" | Chris Humphreys, Mary Humphreys, John Robert King | |
| 1985 | Scotland | Capercaillie | "Ùrnaigh a 'bhan-thigreach" | Catriona Montgomery, Donald Shaw | |
| 1986 | Brittany | Kristen Nicolas | "Gwerz maro paotr anst" | Kristen Nicolas | |
| 1987 | Wales | Eryr Wen | "Gloria tyrd adre" | Euros Jones, Llion Jones | |
| 1988 | Wales | Manon Llwyd | "Cân Wini" | Manon Llwyd, Eirug Wyn | |
| 1989 | Wales | Hefin Huws | "Twll triongl" | Hefin Huws, Les Morrison | |
| 1990 | Scotland | Christine Kennedy | "M' iondrainn air chuairt" | Dòmhnall Mac A' Ghobhainn | |
| 1991 | Cornwall | Philip Knight & Frut Dyfennys | "Deus yn-rag, Dolli" | Philip Knight | |
| 1992 | Ireland | Gerróid O'Murchú | "Soilse geala na cathrach" | | |
| 1993 | Ireland | Liam Ó hUaithne | "An pobal scaipthe" | | |
| 1994 | Wales | Paul Gregory | "Rhyw ddydd" | Paul Gregory, Lorraine King, Dave Parsons | |
| 1995 | Wales | Gwenda Owen | "Cân i'r ynys werdd" | Arwel John, Richard Jones | |
| 1996 | Cornwall | West | "An arvor" | | |
| 1997 | Ireland | Art Ó Dufaigh & Sean Ó hEanaí | "Comhartha an ghaoil" | | |
| 1998 | Wales | Arwel Wyn Roberts | "Rho dy law" | Rhodri Thomas | |
| 1999 | Wales | Per Nod | "Torri'n rhydd" | Stephan Rhys Williams, Matthew McAvoy | |
| 2000 | Cornwall | Rachel & Tir Kemmyn | "Tir kemmyn" | Terry Wallwork | |
| 2001 | Wales | Gainor Haf | "Dagrau ddoe" | Emlyn Dole | |
| 2002 | Wales | Elin Fflur and The Moniars | "Harbwr diogel" | Arfon Wyn, Richard Synnott | |
| 2003 | Cornwall | Treiz Noath | "Mor menta sewia" | | |
| 2004 | Cornwall | Kentyon Bew | "Treusporthys" | | |
| 2005 | Cornwall | Krena | "Fordh dhe Dalvann" | | |
| 2006 | Ireland | Gealbrí | "Seolfaidh me abhaile" | Brighdín Carr, Geraldine Galligan | |
| 2007 | Ireland | Deirdre Ní Chinnéide and Fraoch | "Tá mé caillte go deo" | Damien Mac Gabhann, Declan Masterson | |
| 2008 | Wales | Aled Myrddin | "Atgofion" | Aled Myrddin | |
| 2009 | Wales | Elfed Morris | "Gofidiau" | Elfed Morgan Morris, Lowri Watcyn | |
| 2010 | Scotland | Màiri Chaimbeul & Jenna Moynihan | "Back and Forth" | Màiri Chaimbeul, Jenna Moynihan | |
| 2011 | Wales | Brigyn | "Rhywun yn rhywle" | Ynyr Roberts, Steve Balsamo | |
| 2012 | Cornwall | Bénjad | "Mordid bewnans" | | |
| 2013 | Cornwall | Bénjad | "Breten Vyhan" | Bénjad | |
| 2014 | Isles of Mann | Shenn Scoill | "Tayrn mee thie" | Laura Rowles, David Rowles, Bob Carswell | |
| 2015 | Cornwall | The Changing Room | "Hal an tow" | Tanya Brittain, Sam Kelly | |
| 2016 | Wales | Cordia | "Dim ond un" | Ffion Elin, Rhys Jones | |
| 2017 | Ireland | Emer O'Flaherty, Paddy Mulcahy & Angelo Heart | "Taibhse" | Emer O'Flaherty | |
| 2018 | Ireland | Padraig Seoighe & Niall Teague | "Ar saoire" | Padraig Seoighe, Niall Teague | |
| 2019 | Ireland | Daríona Ní Dhonnchadha, Ollie Hennessy and Ciarán Tourish | "Ní thuigim" | Áine Durkin | |
| 2020 | No contest held due to the COVID-19 pandemic | | | | |
| 2021 | No contest held due to the COVID-19 pandemic | | | | |
| 2022 | No contest held due to the COVID-19 pandemic | | | | |
| 2023 | Cornwall | Karrygi Du | "Oll an dra" | Annie Baylis | |
| 2024 | Wales | Sara Davies | "Ti" | Sara Davies | |
| 2025 | Wales | Dros Dro | "Troseddwr yr awr" | Dros Dro | |
| 2026 | Ireland | Clara Hutchinson and Fiach Ó Muircheartaigh | "Dúlra scriosta" | Dave Barron, Fiach Ó Muircheartaigh | |
