= Fried (2002 TV series) =

- Presented by: Simon Adams
- Country of origin: United Kingdom
- Original language: English

Fried aired on BBC 2W in March/April 2002. Produced by Aspect Television and presented by Simon Adams, it was a mix of short films profiling real people throughout Wales with spoof profiles of fake people and events.

== Presented by ==
- Simon Adams

== Writers, performers & filmmakers ==
Many people contributed to the writing, performing and production of the short films and links that made up the show. Several BBC Wales presenters made "tongue-in-cheek" cameo appearances in the series, including Jamie Owen, Oliver Hides, Frances Donovan, and Jason Mohammad.

== Contributors ==
- This list is incomplete*
- Sara Allen
- Colin Bowen
- Stephen Bush
- Sean Carlsen
- Jon Chapple
- Sally Collins
- Karl Eldridge
- Steve Jenkins
- David Llewellyn
- Pete Telfer
- Tom Law
