= Tastebuddies =

Tastebuddies was a late night show on BBC Choice UK that had started life as a 'straight', 'daytime TV' style studio-based cookery show on BBC Choice Wales presented by Rhian Williams . It soon after became a 10-minute section of a magazine show presented by Amy Charles, called "In Full View" that was also shown on BBC Choice Wales. Following a change of director in 1999 (and dramatic reduction of budget) it became a series of low-budget, anarchic, "fly-on-the-wall" style comedy-cookery sketches in the 2nd and final series of In Full View, and the first 4 episodes of Sleeping Dogs. It was during the 2nd series of In Full View that these sketches were seen by the then new head of BBC Choice, Stuart Murphy. He commissioned Tastebuddies for a 10 part series on BBC Choice UK in 2000.

== Trivia ==
BBC News broadcaster Huw Edwards made a cameo appearance in the final episode.

== Creative cast and crew ==
Some of the more technically able members of the cast role's crossed over with the crew's. Indeed, when not in a scene, actor Stephen Bush also assisted sound, lighting, wardrobe, location-scouting AND direction. Many of the cast were also musicians. For example, Simon, Colin, Alun and Janice sang and played in most of the episodes.

== Cast ==
- Simon Adams
- Colin Bowen
- Stephen Bush
- Sean Carlsen
- Boyd Clack
- Sally Collins
- Steve Floyd
- Tony Gabriel
- Jim Kitson
- Eleanor McRea
- Janice Pugsley
- Alun Roberts
- Jan Wierszylowski
- Rhian Williams original presenter

== Crew ==
- Tim Williamson – Writer and Director
- Jon Rees – Lighting Cameraman
- Adam Jones – Sound
