= Derek Brockway =

Welsh meteorologist

- Born: Derek Clifford Brockway; 29 October 1967 (age 58); Barry, Wales, United Kingdom
- Education: Barry Boys Comprehensive; Coleg Morgannwg; Reading College of Technology
- Occupations: Meteorologist, TV Presenter
- Years active: 1995–present
- Agent: Elite Management
- Notable credit(s): BBC Cymru Wales; BBC Wales Today

Derek Clifford Brockway BEM (born 29 October 1967) is a Welsh meteorologist. He joined the BBC in 1997. Brockway is based at BBC Cymru Wales in Cardiff, Wales and presents weather forecasts on radio, television and online as well as appearing in other programmes.

== Education and training ==
Brockway was born in Barry and attended Holton Road Primary School. His interest in the weather began as a boy during the long, hot summer of 1976. He went to Barry Boys Comprehensive from 1979 to 1986 where he studied A-Levels in mathematics, physics and geology. After leaving school he joined the Civil Service and his first, brief, post was as a clerical assistant for the Department of Social Security. He transferred to the Met Office as an observer, based mainly at Cardiff Weather Centre but with spells making weather reports for air traffic control at Cardiff Airport, Birmingham Airport, and eight months in the Falkland Islands in 1993/4 working closely with the Royal Air Force.

He went to Coleg Morgannwg in Pontypridd and Reading College of Technology where he attained a BTEC Higher National Certificate in mathematics, statistics and physics in 1993.

== Career ==
=== Radio ===
Brockway qualified as a forecaster in 1995 and was posted to Birmingham Weather Centre, broadcasting on several BBC Radio stations across the English Midlands.

=== Television ===
In December 1995 he moved to London, working at The London Studios on South Bank with fellow forecasters Martyn Davies and John Hammond, and briefing weather presenters Siân Lloyd, Laura Greene and Femi Oke. As well as preparing the ITV Weather and Channel 4 weather, Brockway broadcast on GMTV's The Sunday Programme presented by Alastair Stewart and Steve Richards.

After a year in London, Brockway took a position at the Met Office headquarters in Bracknell as an Environmental Consultant. He returned to Wales in September 1997 and joined BBC Wales Today, replacing Helen Willetts as the lead weather forecaster, broadcasting the lunchtime, evening and late forecasts. He also presents weather bulletins for BBC Radio Wales during the week from Monday to Friday.

Brockway has had a lifetime fascination with the weather and has presented a TV show (Derek’s Welsh Weather) and radio show (Derek's Lightning Guide to Weather) on the subject.

The BBC Wales weather department expanded in 2008 and Brockway was joined by weather presenters Sue Charles and Behnaz Akhgar who cover breakfast and the weekends and stand in for him when he is away. He makes 11 live broadcasts a day.

Brockway was awarded the British Empire Medal (BEM) in the 2022 Birthday Honours for services to broadcasting and charity in Wales.

=== Walking ===
A keen walker, he had five series on BBC Radio Wales entitled Weatherman Walking before the programme was converted into a television series. The series of walks was shown on BBC One Wales from January 2011.

=== Welsh language ===
Brockway appeared in The Big Welsh Challenge, a programme in which Welsh personalities are challenged to learn Welsh. At the beginning of the S4C 2015 reality series Cariad@Iaith Brockway described himself as having "quite a bit of Welsh" despite being "not fluent". On 22 June 2010, Brockway featured in the WJEC Higher tier Welsh Second Language Listening and Responding exam, reading the weather headlines and also being interviewed by the exam board's regular interviewers. He introduced himself with his trademark, 'Shwmae!'

=== Other appearances ===
On 26 November 2009, Brockway appeared in Gavin & Stacey (series 3, episode 1) as himself presenting the weather. Other TV appearances include Welsh consumer programme X-Ray and Jamie and Derek's Welsh Weekends with Jamie Owen. He has been a guest panelist on the Radio Wales show What's The Story?. He appeared on the BBC's Auntie's Bloomers as a result of a mishap with an umbrella during the Rugby World Cup. In 2004, along with other personalities from TV and sports, he was photographed naked for a calendar in aid of Autism Cymru.

== Publications ==
- Brockway, Derek & Carey, Julian – Weatherman Walking – Y Lolfa, ISBN 0-86243-917-5
- Brockway, Derek – Whatever the Weather – Gomer Press, ISBN 1-84323-821-7
- Brockway, Derek & Carpenter, Suzanne – Duck and Starfish – Gomer Press, ISBN 978-1-84851-114-9

== See also ==
- BBC Weather

== Video links ==
- Derek and John Powell MBE – Gower weatherman
- Derek Brockway and Tomos Dafydd try clog dancing
- Derek's 2050 Weather Forecast
- Strictly in Need of rehearsals (2009 Children in Need)
