= Bob Humphrys =

British broadcaster

- Born: George Robert Humphrys; 16 April 1952; Splott, Cardiff, Wales
- Died: 18 August 2008 (aged 56); Cardiff, Wales
- Education: Cardiff High School
- Occupation: Journalist
- Notable credit: BBC Wales
- Spouse: Julie Humphrys
- Children: 3
- Relatives: John Humphrys (brother)

George Robert Humphrys (16 April 1952 – 18 August 2008) was a Welsh broadcaster, chiefly known as a sports presenter on BBC Wales.

== Biography ==
Humphrys was born in Splott, a poor working-class district of central Cardiff and was the younger brother of journalist and television presenter John Humphrys. Humphrys was one of five children born to Winifred Mary (Matthews), a hairdresser and Edward George Humphrys, a self-employed French polisher. His great-grandmother, Sarah Willey, had lived in the Cardiff workhouse, and his paternal great-grandfather originated from Finland. Encouraged to do his homework, he passed the eleven plus exam and became a pupil at Cardiff High School, then a grammar school.

After university, he became a newspaper journalist, working on various publications until he joined the Cardiff-based Western Mail. He then joined BBC Radio Wales in 1978, and then joined BBC Wales television's team as an investigative reporter most often beside his brother on Week in Week Out, where his reports included an early investigation of the AIDS epidemic developing in the UK. From the early 1990s Humphrys began reporting on sport, a passion of his. Humphrys and his then colleague, former Welsh Rugby union legend J.J. Williams, presented the first BBC pre-match club house show from Cardiff Rugby Club before a Welsh Rugby international – Humphrys added Taffs Well RFC for atmosphere, who got a bit too drunk through the programme. In 2004 he was given a lifetime achievement award by BBC Wales at the Welsh Sports Personality of the Year awards.

After suffering from pains in his shoulders in late 2007, he undertook an X-ray examination under instruction from his doctor in May 2008, which revealed he was suffering from lung cancer, despite never having smoked. Humphrys confirmed his retirement in June 2008, before revealing his diagnosis in an interview. Before he died on 18 August 2008 at age 56 he completed his autobiography Not a Proper Journalist.

Humphrys and his wife Julie had three children, two daughters and a son, and lived in Cardiff. BBC Wales Today made Humphrys' death their lead story on 19 August 2008, with his former colleague and broadcast trainee Jamie Owen leading the section, with a personal tribute by colleague Vincent Kane.

In 2009, local ice hockey side, the Cardiff Devils held a Nostalgia Night against the Hull Stingrays honouring Bob Humphrys' work with BBC Sport and the coverage of the Devils in the early 1990s. BBC Wales announced a £5,500 student bursary, the Bob Humphrys Bursary, in his honour.
