= Andrea Byrne =

English journalist and presenter

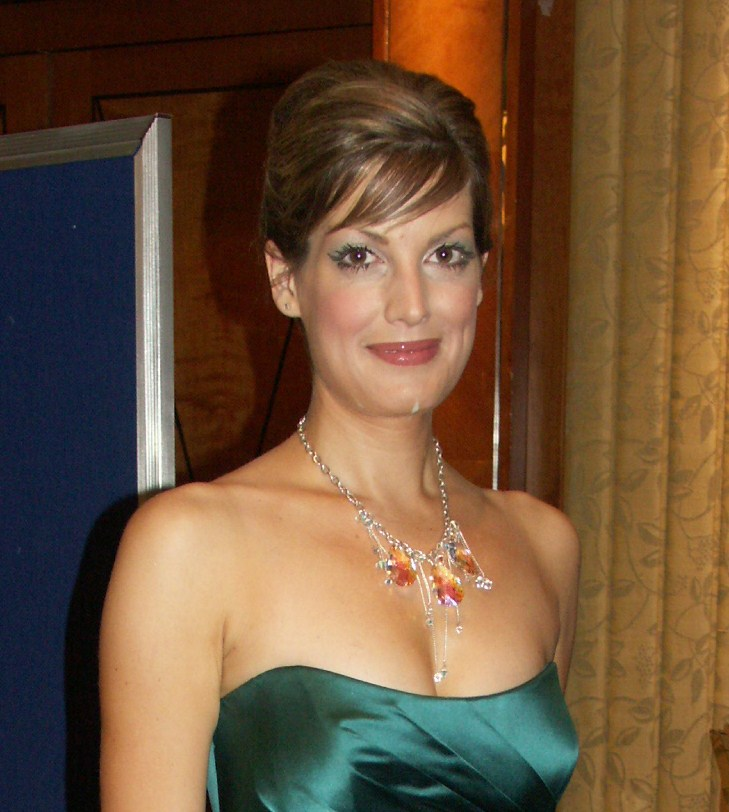
- Born: Andrea Benfield; 1978 (age 47–48); Guildford, Surrey, England
- Education: Tormead School
- Occupation: Journalist
- Notable credit: Wales at Six • Wales This Week
- Spouse: Lee Byrne (m. 2012)

Andrea Byrne (née Benfield; born c.1978) is an English journalist and presenter, currently working for ITV Cymru Wales, where she presents Wales at Six and Wales This Week.

== Personal life ==
Born in Guildford, Surrey, Byrne graduated from Southampton University with a degree in English literature, before gaining a postgraduate diploma in journalism at Highbury College, Portsmouth. Latterly, she has gained a political diploma through the Open University.

Byrne married Wales rugby player Lee Byrne on 1 January 2012. Byrne took a year-long sabbatical in June 2013, before returning to ITV Cymru Wales to anchor the relaunched Wales at Six.

The couple's first child, a daughter, was born in 2019, after being conceived naturally; Byrne had previously been told by doctors that she would likely "never be able to carry her own pregnancy" and spent seven years undergoing IVF treatment.

In September 2026 presenting Sharp End on ITV Wales, it was noticed that Andrea had reverted to her maiden name and was no longer wearing a wedding ring.

== Career ==
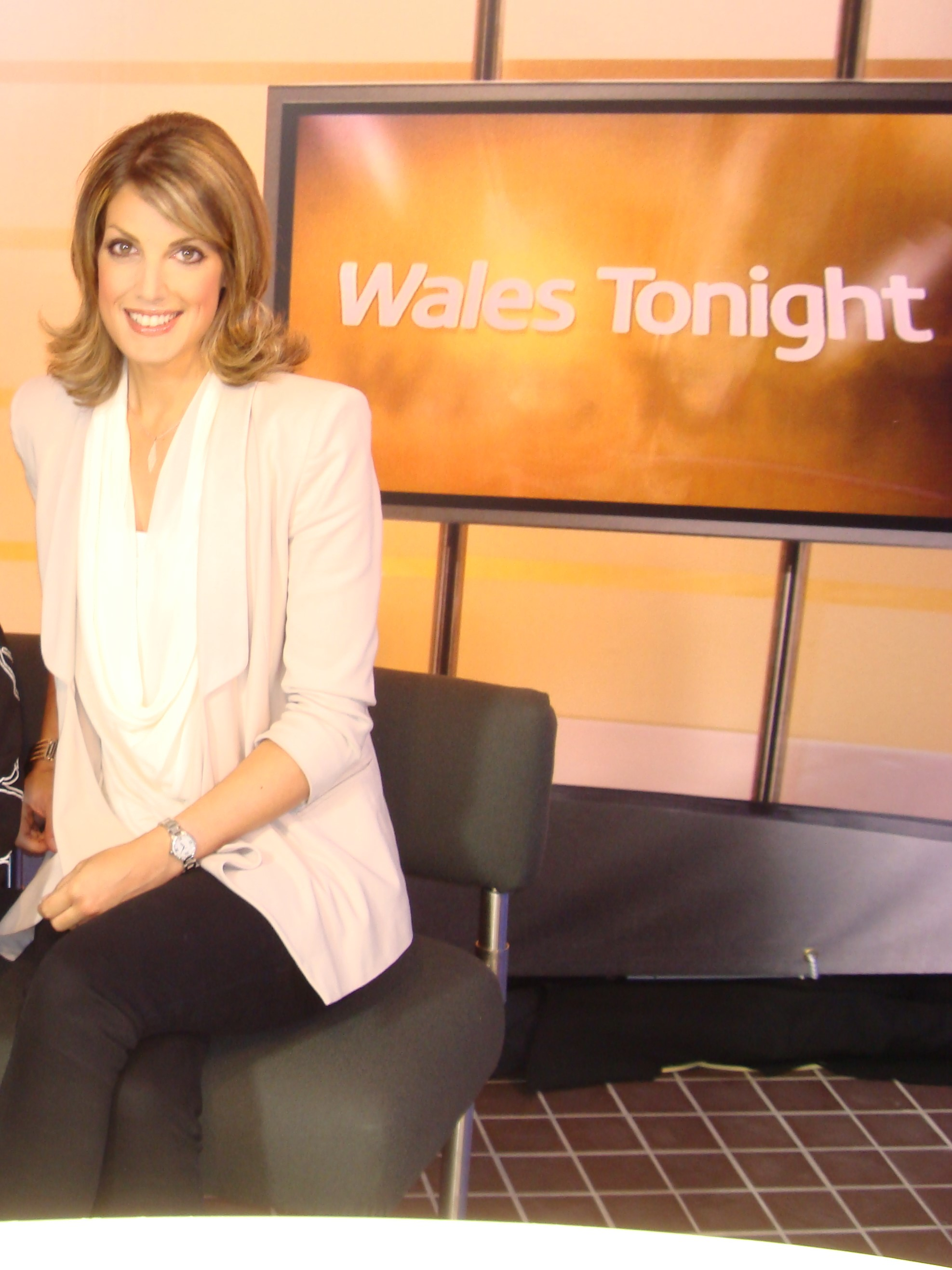
Andrea Byrne

Byrne started her journalism and media career as a local radio reporter for Guildford-based County Sound Radio. She then joined local television station MyTV Portsmouth as a reporter, but when the station was forced to lay off staff, she was promoted to news editor at the station. When Portsmouth TV ceased broadcasting she moved to Oxford's local TV station, Six TV.

Byrne's ITV career began in 2004 when she joined Meridian Tonight as a reporter. She later moved to Thames Valley Tonight as a reporter. It was while here that she produced a series of special reports on the Royal Air Force, reporting on pilots and their training at RAF Odiham before they were posted to Afghanistan, which was also shown nationally on ITV2 and placed runner-up in the regional Royal Television Society awards.

Following the departure of Lucy Owen to BBC Wales' flagship news programme Wales Today in November 2007, Byrne applied for the resulting vacancy on Wales at Six. On 17 December, it was announced that she had beaten 80 other applicants to the post, and undertook her first show opposite Jonathan Hill on 14 January 2008. Prior to her debut, Benfield moved from Surrey to Cardiff Bay.

Since joining ITV Cymru Wales, Byrne has presented a number of various regional non-news programmes for the station, including the arts and entertainment series The Wales Show, documentary series Tidal Wales, ITV Cymru Wales weekly political programme Sharp End and coverage of the Royal Welsh Show and the National Eisteddfod.

Byrne has also acted as a presenter of the ITV Weekend News , debuting in June 2010.

She has previously appeared as an occasional presenter for the ITV Lunchtime News, ITV Evening News and ITV News at Ten, as well as guest appearances for GMTV and Daybreak.
