= Stephen J. Bush =

British actor

Stephen J. Bush is a Welsh actor who started his professional career in early 2000 with a series of comedy sketches on the BBC Choice Wales show Sleeping Dogs. These sketches were later seen and commissioned as a series by the then new BBC Choice/BBC Three controller Stuart Murphy.

== Films/TV ==
- Green Zone - directed by Paul Greengrass (2009)
- Holby City - directed by Sarah O'Gorman - BBC (2007)
- Atonement - directed by Joe Wright (2006)
- Flyboys - directed by Tony Bill - MGM (2006)
- Bad Girls - directed by Barnaby Southcombe - ITV (2006)
- Crimesolver - directed by Sara Allen - BBC Wales (2005)
- Fried - BBC 2W (2002)
- Sleeping Dogs - produced by Tom Law - BBC Choice Wales (2000/01)
- Star Stories Episode 1 - directed by Elliot Hegarty - Channel 4 (2006)
- Forgiven a.k.a. Stand By Your Man - directed by Paul Wilmshurst - More 4 (2007)
- Tastebuddies - directed by Tim Williamson - BBC Choice (2000)
- The Welsh Great Escape - directed by Michael Davies - Channel 4 (2003)
- Vital Signs - directed by Charles Palmer - ITV (2006)
