= Cariad@iaith:love4language =

British reality television series

- Created by: Fflic
- Presented by: Nia Parry (2002–present); Rhodri Owen (2004); Gareth Roberts (2011–2012); Wynne Evans (2015–present)
- Country of origin: United Kingdom
- No. of episodes: 9 (2011), 9 (2012)

Production
- Production locations: Fforest Farm, Ceredigion; Cilgerran, Pembrokeshire; Llithfaen, Gwynedd
- Running time: 60 minutes

Original release
- Network: S4C
- Release: 2002 – present

cariad@iaith:love4language is an S4C reality television series in which people attempt to learn the Welsh language.

== History ==
Commissioned in 2002 from an idea by Fflic production staff, the Welsh television programme cariad@iaith:love4language originally involved members of the public who wished to learn Welsh, spending six weeks at Nant Gwrtheyrn language centre on the Llŷn Peninsula.

This evolved into a week-long live series, airing in 2004, in which seven celebrities of Welsh extraction - Janet Street-Porter, Ruth Madoc, Dame Tanni Grey-Thompson, Amy Wadge, Steve Strange, Bernard Latham and Jamie Shaw - spent the week at Nant Gwrtheyrn.

In 2011, cariad@iaith:love4language was recommissioned, and launched on 8 July revealing Matt Johnson, Sophie Evans, Josie d'Arby, Colin Charvis, Helen Lederer, Rhys Hutchings, Melanie Walters and Lembit Öpik as the celebrities set to spend a week learning the language under the tutelage of Nia Parry and Ioan Talfryn at fforest eco-camp in west Wales.

The series returned for a Christmas special on 24 December 2011, in which seven of the celebrities spent a weekend in Laugharne, Carmarthenshire.

cariad@iaith:love4language returned on 23 May 2012 with a new celebrity line-up, as CBeebies presenter Alex Winters; Scrum V and BBC Sports Wales presenter Lisa Rogers; tenor Wynne Evans – or Gio Compario from the GoCompare.com TV ads; Lucy Owen, news presenter; rugby player Gareth Thomas; former X-Factor contestant Lucie Jones; actor Robert Pugh; and actress Di Botcher attempt to learn Welsh.

The 2013 series of cariad@iaith:love4language invited members of the public who wish to learn Welsh to take part.

The 2014 series involved eight celebrities including goalkeeper Neville Southall, weather presenter Behnaz Akhgar, singer Ian Watkins and Big Brother winner Sam Evans.

The 2015 series was filmed at the Centre for Alternative Technology near Machynlleth and broadcast on S4C in June 2015. In this series, presenter Nia Parry was joined by previous participant Wynne Evans as host. For this series the Welsh learners were comedian Chris Corcoran, actor and writer Steve Speirs, TV weatherman Derek Brockway, actress Nicola Reynolds, former international rugby player Tom Shanklin, CBeebies presenter Rebecca Keatley, athlete Jamie Baulch. The winner of the series was announced to be Caroline Sheen.
