= Louise Elliott =

Welsh broadcaster and journalist

- Born: Louise Elliott; 1969 (age 56–57); Ashington, Northumberland
- Status: Married
- Occupations: Journalist, Presenter
- Agent: Elite Management
- Notable credit(s): HTV Wales; BBC Radio Wales
- Website: http://www.welshstars.co.uk/artistes/louise_elliott.html

Louise Elliott (born 1969, in Ashington) is a Welsh broadcaster and journalist.

== Biography ==
Born in Ashington, Northumberland, her father Dave Elliott was a professional football player at Sunderland and Newcastle United. At the age of five, her family moved to Wales - she was brought up at Llandegfan near Menai Bridge on Anglesey.

=== Newspapers ===
After competing her A Levels, Elliott joined the North Wales Chronicle in Bangor as a trainee reporter. She then worked on local newspapers in Colwyn Bay and Rhyl, before moving to the Wrexham Evening Leader, where she covered the Hillsborough disaster. Four years later, she became education correspondent for the Preston-based Lancashire Evening Post.

After a year, Elliott joined the Daily Post, where, for reports including one from Bosnia with the Red Cross on the Mostar massacre, she twice won the regional Young Journalist of the Year award. She then became news editor of three editions of the Daily Post, becoming at the age of 26, one of the youngest news editors in regional newspapers.

=== Broadcasting ===
Elliott then took a job with HTV Wales as a North Wales correspondent for Wales Tonight, based at the station's Colwyn Bay newsroom.

She then moved to BBC Wales' Bangor newsroom as a North Wales reporter, before relocating to Cardiff to become education correspondent. As part of her BBC training, she also reported for BBC Radio 4, BBC Radio 5 Live and later the BBC News Channel, as both a regional and special UK correspondent. She later became the presenter of BBC Wales' flagship current affairs series Week In, Week Out and the consumer affairs programme X-ray.

Elliott later switched to radio, joining Jamie Owen in 2007 as host of a weekday morning show on BBC Radio Wales. On 24 September 2012, she became the host of the station's weekday afternoon show, replacing Roy Noble, but quit just over a year later in order to pursue writing ambitions.

She returned to BBC Radio Wales in February 2015 as the new main presenter of the flagship breakfast news programme, Good Morning Wales, alongside Oliver Hides. Elliott left the programme ten months later.
