= Sleeping Dogs (TV series) =

Sleeping Dogs is a late night programme aired on BBC Choice Wales that ran for two series from 2000 until 2001. The show consists of a mix of short, quirky factual films featuring people from all walks of life from around Wales coupled with darkly surreal comic shorts.

== Trivia ==
- It was presented by actress Jenny Evans, who had also played Bonny Cartwright in 1997 film Twin Town.
- Author David Llewellyn wrote and acted in the sketch The Technostics Church of Great Britain for the series.
- Sean Carlsen is a regular in Big Finish Productions' Doctor Who audio adventures and played a policeman in the 2005 Doctor Who Christmas special The Christmas Invasion. He was also butchered by an alien in Torchwood episode "Sleepers".

== Staff ==
- Simon Adams
- Sara Allen
- Colin Bowen
- Stephen Bush
- Sean Carlsen
- Jon Chapple – Shooting at Unarmed Men/Mclusky
- Sally Collins
- Jenny Evans
- Rob Finighan
- Steve Floyd
- Matt Hurley
- Steve Jenkins
- Tom Law
- Kyle Legal
- David Llewellyn
- Eleanor McRea
- Paul Owen
- Janice Pugsley
- Alun Roberts
- Pete Telfer
- Jan Wierszylowski
- Ronnie Williams
- Tim Williamson

== References/Links ==
- http://aspect-tv.com/programmes.htm
- http://www.spock.com/Pete-Telfer-Rdgqx15
- http://www.madjanice.com/
- https://actors.mandy.com/uk/actor/profile/stephen-bush
- https://www.theatre-wales.co.uk/performers/performers_details.asp?individualID=441
- https://actors.mandy.com/uk
