= Eleri Siôn =

Welsh radio and television presenter

- Born: Eleri Jones; 18 January 1971 (age 55); Neuaddlwyd, Aberaeron, Wales
- Education: Ysgol Gyfun Aberaeron
- Alma mater: Cardiff University
- Occupations: Radio and television presenter
- Spouse: David Hughes

Eleri Siôn (Welsh pronunciation: [ɛˈleːri ˈʃoːn]; born Eleri Jones on 18 January 1971) is a Welsh radio and television presenter. She currently presents The Friday Afternoon Show and The Late Show on BBC Radio Wales Monday-Thursday.

== Early life ==
Born and raised on a farm in Neuaddlwyd, Aberaeron, she was educated at Ysgol Gyfun Aberaeron. Her brother is the actor and author Meilyr Siôn. Their father was a farmer and their mother died at the age of 46 when Eleri was 18 years old.

== Career ==
After training and working as a singer and part-time presenter of children's television programmes, she started reading Welsh at Cardiff University. She then took a two-year break in order to present children's sports programme Cracabant before finishing her degree at Cardiff University. Having played rugby union at university, and captained Cardiff Ladies for a year, she joined the sports department of BBC Radio Cymru in 1995, becoming the first woman to report on rugby for the station.

After graduation she worked as a television producer with production company Apollo, on programmes such as Noc Noc, Cân i Gymru (Song for Wales) and Dudley. She returned to sports in 1997 as a sub-producer and presenter on Y Clwb Rygbi (The Rugby Club). She then introduced various series, including Seven a Side Rugby World Games, Irish Rugby, World Championship netball and roller-hockey World Championships. During this period she also presented Saturday afternoon sports programme Camp Lawn (Grand Slam) with Dylan Ebenezer on BBC Radio Cymru. This led to production and presentation work on Sky Sports on its darts and pool coverage.

Siôn then presented a number of non-sports programmes on S4C, including talent programme Wawffactor, S4C's coverage of Eisteddfod yr Urdd and presented Y Briodas Fawr (The Big Wedding) with Rhodri Owen. After becoming part of the posse on Jonathan Davies S4C Friday evening show Jonathan, she presented her own chat-show Cadair Fawr Eleri Sion (Eleri Sion's Big Chair). She also presented quiz show 100 o Blant (A Hundred Children) produced by Tinopolis in 2013 and was a presenter on nightly magazine show Heno (Tonight) for the same production company for a period in 2012/13.

Between October 2013 and December 2020, Siôn presented the daily afternoon radio show on BBC Radio Wales, replacing Louise Elliott. In January 2021, Siôn replaced Mal Pope as the presenter of the BBC Radio Wales Late Show from Monday-Thursday (22:00-00:30), while she continued to present the afternoon show on Fridays (14:00-17:00).
