= Nick Servini =

Welsh news presenter

- Born: 28 November 1980 (age 45); Aberdare, Wales
- Education: Southampton University (BA)
- Television: BBC Wales Today

Nick Servini (born 28 November 1980) is a Welsh journalist and news presenter. He is one of the presenters of BBC Wales Today, the BBC's National television news programme for Wales, a position he has held since 2018. He is of Italian decent.

Servini has previously been the Wales political editor and business correspondent for BBC Cymru Wales. He has also been a debate moderator for Welsh political debates, including for the 2026 Senedd election.

== Early life and education ==
Nick Servini was born on 28 November 1980 in Aberdare, Rhondda Cynon Taf, Wales. He attended Bishop Hedley Catholic High School in Merthyr Tydfil and Millfield School in Somerset. He later studied philosophy at Southampton University and trained as a journalist at Highbury College Portsmouth.

Servini worked as a trainee at Essex Chronicle, a newspaper agency in Chelmsford, before working for South Wales Echo and Welsh Mirror. He joined the BBC in London, writing news bulletins BBC Radio Four and BBC Radio Five Live. He moved back to Wales as a reporter for BBC Radio Wales’ Good Morning Wales Programme. Servini subsequently became the business correspondent and Wales political editor for BBC Cymru Wales.
