= Lee Byrne =

Welsh rugby player (born 1980)

- Born: Lee Martin Byrne; 1 June 1980 (age 46) Bridgend, Wales
- Height: 191 cm (6 ft 3 in)
- Weight: 98 kg (15 st 6 lb)
- Notable relative: Andrea Byrne (wife)

Rugby union career
- Position(s): Fullback, Wing
Amateur team(s)
Years	Team	Apps	(Points)
–	Tondu RFC		
–	Bridgend Athletic		
–	Penygraig		
Senior career
Years	Team	Apps	(Points)
2003–2005	Llanelli RFC	41	(72)
2003–2006	Scarlets	29	(50)
2006–2011	Ospreys	92	(145)
2011–2014	Clermont	62	(45)
2014–2015	Dragons	6	(0)
International career
Years	Team	Apps	(Points)
2005–2011	Wales	46	(55)
2009	British & Irish Lions	1	(0)
- Correct as of 24 November 2011
- Rugby league career

Playing information
Club
Years	Team	Pld	T	G	FG	P
	Bridgend Blue Bulls

Lee Byrne (born 1 June 1980) is a Welsh former professional rugby union and rugby league footballer who played in the 2000s and 2010s.

== Club career ==
Byrne started his career playing rugby union for Bridgend Athletic RFC; and Tondu RFC, as a full-back or wing, and after being spotted playing rugby league for Bridgend Blue Bulls, he signed for the Llanelli Scarlets.

While playing against Connacht in 2007, Byrne as a stand-in kicker kicked two penalties and two conversions after fly-half Shaun Connor went off injured.

Given permission to seek a new club for the 2011–12 season, Byrne signed a three-year deal to play for French club ASM Clermont Auvergne, to play his club rugby post the 2011 Rugby World Cup.

On 8 January 2014, it was reported that Byrne had agreed to join Newport Gwent Dragons from the end of the 2013–14 season.

On 23 April 2015, it was announced Byrne was to retire from all rugby with immediate effect, after failing to recover from a shoulder injury.

== International career ==
Following his performances for the Llanelli Scarlets in both the Celtic League, and the Heineken Cup during the 2005–06 season, he was called up to the national squad for the November Test series. He made his début as a replacement against New Zealand on 5 November at the Millennium Stadium; Wales lost 41–3. He also played in the win over Fiji, and the defeat by South Africa. He has since played during the 2006 Six Nations Championship, and earned a further two caps in a mid-year series against Argentina. His sole appearance in the 2006 Autumn internationals was on the wing against the Pacific Islands. Byrne played in the 2008 Six Nations Championship tournament at full back and was a component of Wales' Grand Slam team.

He scored tries against England and Italy in the 2008 Six Nations Championship. Following his performances for Wales in the 2008 Autumn Internationals against South Africa, New Zealand, and Australia (which included a try against the latter), Byrne had been tipped not only for a place in the British & Irish Lions squad, but also a place in the starting 15. This was confirmed on 21 April 2009, when Byrne, along with Ireland's Rob Kearney, were selected as one of the British & Irish Lions' fullbacks for the tour. After the fourth tour match he was one of five players to be picked for three of them.

He caused controversy in February 2010 during the Scotland match when Scotland's coach Andy Robinson accused Byrne of diving to get substitute fly-half Phil Godman sent off and give Wales a penalty, from which they scored and went on to win the match.

Byrne was a member of the Wales squad for the 2011 Rugby World Cup. He earned his final cap in the pool match against Fiji.

=== International tries ===
==== Wales ====
Try	Opponent	Location	Venue	Competition	Date	Result
1	Argentina	Buenos Aires, Argentina	Estadio Jose Amalfitani	2006 June rugby union tests	17 June 2006	Loss
2	Pacific Islanders	Cardiff, Wales	Millennium Stadium	2006 Autumn Internationals	11 November 2006	Win
3	England	London, England	Twickenham Stadium	2008 Six Nations	2 February 2008	Win
4	Italy	Cardiff, Wales	Millennium Stadium	2008 Six Nations	3 February 2008	Win
5	Italy	Cardiff, Wales	Millennium Stadium	2008 Six Nations	3 February 2008	Win
6	Australia	Cardiff, Wales	Millennium Stadium	2008 Autumn Internationals	29 November 2008	Win
7	France	Paris, France	Stade de France	2009 Six Nations	27 February 2009	Loss
8	Scotland	Cardiff, Wales	Millennium Stadium	2010 Six Nations	13 February 2010	Win
9	New Zealand	Cardiff, Wales	Millennium Stadium	2010 Autumn Internationals	27 November 2010	Loss
10	Namibia	New Plymouth, New Zealand	Yarrow Stadium	2011 Rugby World Cup	26 September 2011	Win

== Personal life ==
It was announced in March 2011 that Byrne had become engaged to ITV Wales Tonight presenter Andrea Benfield; they married on New Year's Day 2012.

The couple's first child, a daughter, was born in 2019, after being conceived naturally; Byrne had previously been told by doctors that she would likely "never be able to carry her own pregnancy" and spent seven years undergoing IVF treatment.

Byrne has spoken publicly about his dyslexia. It has caused him some setbacks - "There were a couple of times where I would go out and the French players would say I wasn’t picking up French very easily. I remember one of the players saying I was lazy and I wasn't learning. Obviously there was a reason because of my dyslexia, so that upset me a little bit" - but it has not been exclusively a negative for him - "I could see space before it happened - quicker than anybody else - so in a way I suppose it was a gift for me."

In November 2017, Lee Byrne published his autobiography, The Byrne Identity. Sections from it were serialised over four editions of the Western Mail newspaper.
