= Fried =

Fried may refer to:

- Fried (surname)
- Fried, Frank, Harris, Shriver & Jacobson, a law firm
- Fried (2002 TV series), a British TV series
- Fried (2015 TV series), a TV series aired on BBC Three
- Fried's rule

== Music ==
- Fried (album), a 1984 album by Julian Cope
- Fried (band), a band made up of U.S. soul singer Jonte Short and ex-The Beat and Fine Young Cannibals guitarist David Steele
- "Fried" (song), by ¥$, 2024
- "Fried" (song), by E-40 from Revenue Retrievin': Graveyard Shift, 2011
- "Fried (She a Vibe)", song by Future and Metro Boomin from We Don't Trust You, 2024
- "Fried" (song) by King Gizzard and the Lizard Wizard from Teenage Gizzard, 2020
- Fried (Album), a 2020 album by Fried By Fluoride
