= Behnaz Akhgar =

Iranian-Welsh weather presenter (born 1980)

- Born: 21 June 1980 (age 46); Shiraz, Iran
- Education: University of Glamorgan
- Occupations: Weather presenter, radio presenter
- Employer: BBC

Behnaz Akhgar (Persian: بهناز اخگر; born 21 June 1980) is an Iranian-Welsh weather presenter currently working for BBC's Wales Today. She broadcasts the morning and weekend bulletins with Sue Charles, and acts as a relief presenter for meteorologist Derek Brockway. Behnaz, often called Benni, is from a Persian-Welsh background; her first language is Persian.

She entered the Miss Wales pageant in 1998.

== Early life ==
Akhgar was born in Shiraz, Iran. When she arrived in Britain she spoke no English. She moved to Swansea when she was 10 years old, attended Terrace Road School, then Dynevor Comprehensive School (where coincidentally her parents opened a shop around the corner from there named "Dagwood's") and has lived in Wales since. She attended the University of Glamorgan where she gained a BA in communication studies, followed by a postgraduate diploma in broadcast journalism at Cardiff University.

== Career ==
Akhgar joined the BBC in 2001, working behind the scenes before becoming a picture editor and video journalist. During this time, she applied for weather-presenting jobs, landing her current role in 2008 – on her third attempt.

Akhgar presents the weather with Sue Charles, and acts as a relief presenter for Derek Brockway. She also presents regular bulletins on BBC Radio Wales throughout the day. She has described the harassment she experiences as a female forecaster from "geeks" who complain about her glamorous appearance.

Akhgar has also broadcast features on the BBC World Service about the plight of women in the developing world.

In 2016, she appeared on the BBC One programme "Search For A*" alongside other celebrities Wynne Evans and Omar Hamdi. In January 2021, Akhgar replaced Eleri Siôn as the presenter of the afternoon show on BBC Radio Wales from Monday to Thursday.
