= Dave Elliott (footballer, born 1945) =

English footballer and manager

Personal information
- Full name: David Elliott
- Date of birth: 10 February 1945 (age 81)
- Place of birth: Tantobie, England
- Height: 5 ft 8 in (1.73 m)
- Position: Midfielder

Youth career
- Sunderland

Senior career*
Years	Team	Apps	(Gls)
1962–1966	Sunderland	31	(1)
1966–1971	Newcastle United	80	(4)
1971–1975	Southend United	178	(9)
1975–1976	Newport County	21	(0)
1976–1978	Bangor City		
1978–1979	Newport County	2	(0)
- Caernarfon Town

Managerial career
- 1975–1976: Newport County (player-manager)
- 1976–1978: Bangor City (player-manager)
- Caernarfon Town (player-manager)
- * Club domestic league appearances and goals

Dave Elliott (born 10 February 1945) is an English former professional footballer and manager.

A midfielder, he began his career as an apprentice at Sunderland before moving to Newcastle United and Southend United. In 1975, he joined Newport County as player/manager and made 21 Football League appearances in the 1975–76 season before joining Bangor City as player/manager. He rejoined Newport during the 1978–79 season, making a further two appearances before becoming player/manager of Caernarfon Town.

His daughter, Louise Elliott, is a TV and radio presenter for BBC Wales.

After retirement, he opened a shop in Bangor, Gwynedd which remained well into the 1990s called'Dave Elliott Sports' which was very successful until the arrival of Allsports (which later became JJB Sports).
