= Einir Dafydd =

Welsh singer

- Born: Einir Dafydd; Pembrokeshire, Wales
- Occupation: Musician/songwriter
- Instrument: singing
- Years active: 2006–
- Label: Rasp
- Website: www.studio-86.co.uk/einirdafydd/

Einir Dafydd is a Welsh singer who won the third series of the television talent show Wawffactor and the 2007 Cân i Gymru (A Song for Wales) competition.

Dafydd started her career as the lead singer in the band Garej Dolwen, but first came to prominence after winning the Wawffactor competition televised on S4C in March 2006. This provided the opportunity for exposure on other S4C television shows, such as Wedi 7 and Noson Lawen, as well as the chance to record a CD. Her debut EP, titled Y Garreg Las (The Blue Rock) was launched in June 2006 at Theatr y Gromlech, Crymych, and featured three songs and a music video.

December 2006 saw Dafydd share a stage with Bryn Fôn and Bryn Terfel at the Llangollen Christmas concert that was televised on S4C. In March 2007, Dafydd won the Cân i Gymru competition with a song titled "Blwyddyn Mas" (Year Out) that she had co-written with Ceri Wyn Jones.

A second EP, Ffeindia Fi (Find Me), was released in the summer of 2007 which contained six tracks, including Blwyddyn Mas. Since 2010 Einir presented the Welsh children's service on S4C - Cyw before leaving to pursue a career as a primary school teacher.

== Discography ==
=== EPs ===
| Year | Album details |
|---|---|
| 2006 | Y Garreg Las: Released: June 2006; Label: S4C; Format: CD |
| 2007 | Ffeindia Fi: Released: August 2007; Label: Rasp; Format: CD |
