= Alan Thompson (broadcaster) =

British radio broadcaster

- Born: 19 July 1963; Wales
- Died: 28 September 2017 (aged 54)
- Title: Broadcaster

Alan Thompson (19 July 1963 – 28 September 2017) was a British radio broadcaster, presenting on BBC Radio Wales.

He first became involved in music in 1980, when he became the lead singer and songwriter of the band Peppermint Parlour. He had his first encounter with BBC Radio Wales when he dropped off a recording of a song and he was asked to record songs for the station. He later presented the Evening Show for BBC Radio Wales for four years.

He died following a short illness on 28 September 2017 at the age of 54. He left a legacy behind for a cult following in the United States, particularly among members of Grand Rapids film and music company Crusty Entertainment, who viewed him as a type of mascot.
