= Alex Winters =

Welsh television presenter (born 1977)

- Born: 10 January 1977 (age 49); Cardiff, Wales
- Occupation: Television presenter
- Known for: Presenting CBeebies (2009–2016)

Alex Winters (born 10 January 1977, Cardiff, Wales) is a Welsh children's television presenter and actor.

Winters studied Drama and Theatre Studies with Psychology in Liverpool before he worked on a range of theatre projects and as a supporting artist in the locally filmed programmes Torchwood and Doctor Who.

Winters was named as one of two new continuity presenters for Discover and Do and The Bedtime Hour on the BBC children's channel CBeebies, alongside Cerrie Burnell. His first presentation links were broadcast on 26 January 2009. Winters left presenting CBeebies in 2016.

Winters was one of eight celebrities chosen to participate in an intense week learning Welsh in an eco-friendly chic campsite in Pembrokeshire, in the series cariad@iaith:love4language shown on S4C in May 2012.

After leaving CBeebies, Winters went on to found Gung-Ho!, an inflatable obstacle race company.

In 2016, Alex was interviewed by Mormon Stories Podcast about his upbringing and his journey away from Mormonism.

In 2021, he was the floor manager of Series 5 of CBeebies programme Justin's House.

In 2022, he starting working in international sport presentation.
