= Geraint Owen =

Welsh actor and politician

- Born: 1966
- Died: 11 July 2009 (aged 43); Swansea, Wales
- Occupation(s): Actor; Politician
- Notable credit: Pobl y Cwm
- Family: Rhodri Owen (brother)

Geraint Owen (1966 – 11 July 2009) was a Welsh actor and politician.

== Career ==
=== Acting career ===
Owen acted in the Welsh-language soap Pobol y Cwm from 1991 to 1996. Owen voiced Joram in the 1999 movie, The Miracle Maker.

=== Political career ===
Owen was a councillor for Plaid Cymru and had stood in assembly and parliamentary elections, contesting the Neath constituency in the 2005 election. Owen came second to Peter Hain in the election.

== Filmography ==
| Year | Title | Role | Notes |
|---|---|---|---|
| 1991-1996 | Pobl y Cwm | PC Rod Phillips | |
| 1996 | Testament: The Bible in Animation | The voice of the Lord | S1, E4: Elijah |
| 1999 | The Miracle Maker | Joram | |

== Personal life ==
Owen was the elder brother of TV presenter Rhodri Owen. In 2009, he was convicted of driving under the influence of alcohol and received a 12 month driving ban. Owen died on 11 July 2009, at the age of 43.
