= Sara Edwards =

British journalist and broadcaster (born 1963/64)

Sara Edwards CStJ
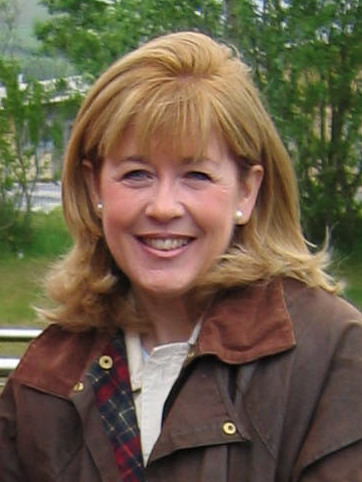
- Edwards in 2005
- Born: 1963 or 1964 (age 61–62); Wales, United Kingdom
- Occupations: Journalist; Broadcaster
- Spouse: Jonathon Riley (divorced: 2017)
- Children: 1

Sara Elinor Edwards CStJ (born 1960) is a Welsh broadcaster. She has been a co-presenter of BBC Wales' early-evening news programme, Wales Today. She is the Lord Lieutenant of Dyfed.

== Biography ==
Edwards was born in Cardiff, the daughter of actress Gwenyth Petty. She was brought up and educated in London, where she studied medieval and modern history.

She started her career with Capital Radio, contributed regular items to BBC Radio Four, and was a continuity announcer and newsreader for HTV West before joining BBC Wales News. She has regularly presented from the Royal Welsh Show and the National Eisteddfod, and has made several series for BBC 2W, including documentaries on rivers, horses, architecture and on the countryside in general.

Her other television work has included presenting Children in Need for the BBC; a series on the Sotheby's Welsh Sale; and, in Welsh for S4C, Saith Diwrnod Ar y Sul, a weekly review of world news. She also co-hosted the BBC's Breakfast from Cardiff. In the summer of 2008 she presented the Bryn Terfel Faenol Music Festival and the BBC Wales Arts Review of the Year.

Her interviews for BBC Wales have included Prince Charles, Prince Albert of Monaco, Kyffin Williams, Dame Edna Everage and politicians including Geoffrey Howe, Ann Widdecombe and Dafydd Elis-Thomas.

Edwards has also presented a number of radio programmes for Radio Wales, including Sara's People and Food Matters.

=== Lord Lieutenant of Dyfed ===
In 2016 Edwards was appointed Lord Lieutenant of Dyfed, the first woman to serve in the role.

== Other activities ==
Edwards is a Commander of the Order of St John and a supporter of St John Cymru Wales. She has presented gold Duke of Edinburgh Awards on behalf of The Duke of Edinburgh at St James's Palace.

Edwards is the Divisional Vice President of the NSPCC in West Wales, and is involved with Cancer Research Wales and the British Heart Foundation. She was previously on the council of the University of Wales, Lampeter and on the board of the Wales Youth Agency.

== Personal life ==
Sara Edwards was 46 when she and her former husband, military historian Lieutenant General Jonathon Riley of the Royal Welch Fusiliers, became the parents of a daughter, born in Cardiff, 19 March 2006. Edwards and Riley divorced in 2017.
