= A Song in My Heart =

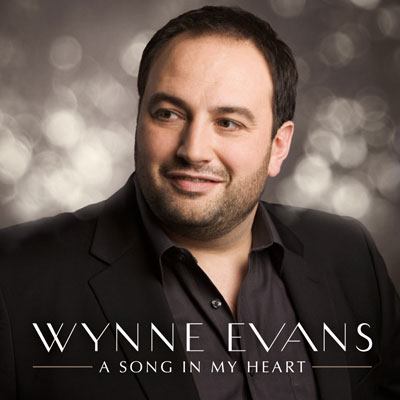

Studio album by Wynne Evans
- Released: March 21, 2011
- Recorded: 2011
- Genre: Classical crossover, Opera
- Label: Warner Music

Wynne Evans chronology
A Song in My Heart (2011)	Wynne (2013)

A Song in My Heart is the first studio album from Welsh tenor Wynne Evans and was released on 21 March 2011. Evans signed a six-album deal with Warner Music. The album went to number one in the UK Classical Albums Chart in its first week of release.

== Track listing ==
No.	Title	Length
1.	"With a Song in My Heart"	2:31
2.	"Because You're Mine"	3:07
3.	"Be My Love"	2:36
4.	"Because"	2:29
5.	"Granada"	3:12
6.	"The Lord's Prayer" (Welsh Version)	2:43
7.	"I'll Walk with God"	2:28
8.	"Over There"	2:28
9.	"The Loveliest Night of the Year"	3:09
10.	"La donna è mobile"	2:04
11.	"E lucevan le stelle"	2:39
12.	"Core N'grato/Torna A Surriento" (Medley)	5:09
13.	"O Sole Mio/Funiculi Funicula" (Medley)	3:49
14.	"Nessun Dorma"	3:15
15.	"Ave Maria"	5:00
16.	"The Lord's Prayer"	2:46

== Charts ==
Chart (2011)	Position
UK Albums (OCC)	40
UK Classical Albums (OCC)	1
