= Wynne Evans =

Welsh singer, comedian, and actor (born 1972)

Wynne Evans BEM
- Evans on the cover of A Song in My Heart c. 2011
- Born: James Wynne Evans; 27 January 1972 (age 54); Carmarthen, Wales
- Education: Guildhall School of Music and Drama
- Occupations: Singer; presenter; actor
- Known for: Go Compare adverts, BBC Radio Wales
- Spouse: Tanwen Evans (m. 1999; div. 2016)
- Children: 2

James Wynne Evans BEM (born 27 January 1972) is a Welsh opera singer, presenter and actor, known for his role as Gio Compario and latterly himself in Go.Compare insurance adverts on UK television. Evans hosted a regular radio programme on BBC Radio Wales and has hosted programmes on BBC Radio 2.

Evans sang the role of Ubaldo Piangi in the 25th anniversary production of Andrew Lloyd Webber's The Phantom of the Opera at the Royal Albert Hall, and sang "Glory Glory Tottenham Hotspur" at the last game at White Hart Lane. He reprised the song at the opening of Spurs' new stadium. In 2023 Evans won the eighteenth series of Celebrity MasterChef on BBC One and in 2024 he competed in the twenty-second series of Strictly Come Dancing with partner, Katya Jones before getting eliminated in Blackpool.

== Opera singer ==
Born in Carmarthen, Wales, Evans studied at the Guildhall School of Music and Drama and the National Opera Studio.

In late 2011, Evans was cast as the opera singer Ubaldo Piangi, in the 25th anniversary celebratory production of Andrew Lloyd Webber's The Phantom of the Opera at the Royal Albert Hall.

Evans enjoys a close association with Welsh National Opera where his roles include Nemorino in L'elisir d'amore, Cassio in Otello (S4C Broadcast), The Duke in Rigoletto, Rodolfo in La bohème, Pedrillo in Die Entführung aus dem Serail, Tamino in Die Zauberflöte, Alfredo in La traviata, Jaquino in Leonore (BBC Broadcast), the Schoolmaster in The Cunning Little Vixen, the Chevalier in Les Dialogues des Carmelites, the Italian Tenor in Der Rosenkavalier, the First Jew in Salome (S4C and BBC Broadcast), Liberto in L'incoronazione di Poppea, Brighella in Ariadne auf Naxos and Alfred in Die Fledermaus.

He made his debut at the Royal Opera House, Covent Garden in 2009 singing Vakula in the new production of Cherevichki, and appeared again in 2011 as the Mayor of Mexia in Mark-Anthony Turnage's opera Anna Nicole, based on the life of Anna Nicole Smith.

For Opera de Lyon he has sung Gianni Schicchi, Il Tabarro and The Cunning Little Vixen. For English National Opera Evans has sung Alfredo in La Traviata, Spoletta and Cavaradossi in Tosca, and Second Jew in Salome. For Opera North he has appeared as Fenton in Falstaff, Prunier in La Rondine and Paulino in The Secret Marriage. For Scottish Opera his roles include Tamino in Die Zauberflöte and the Italian Tenor in Der Rosenkavalier. For Grange Park Opera he has performed the roles of Trufaldino The Love for Three Oranges the Italian Tenor Capriccio the Schoolmaster in The Cunning Little Vixen and Harry in La Fanciulla del West. For the Classical Opera Company Evans sang the role of Fracasso in La Finta Semplice. Other credits include Orpheus in Orpheus in the underworld for Opera Holland Park and The Peacock in Param Vir’s Broken Strings for the Almeida Theatre, which was recorded for the BBC.

== Concert singer ==
As a concert singer Evans' appearances include Vaughan Williams' Serenade to Music at the televised opening night of the 2001 BBC Proms, Beethoven's Ninth Symphony for RTÉ, Elgars' The Dream of Gerontius at the Welsh Proms, the Verdi Requiem at the Royal Albert Hall and a recital at the Wigmore Hall, London.

Evans sings as a soloist on three CD volumes entitled Here Come the Classics with the Royal Philharmonic Orchestra, has recorded Salome and Ariadne auf Naxos for Chandos Records and has appeared several times on the BBC's Friday Night is Music Night.

He also presents on BBC Radio Wales with his brother, Mark Evans, and was awarded the MStJ by Queen Elizabeth II in 2008.

== Recording artist ==
In 2010, Evans signed a six-album deal with Warner Music; his first album is called A Song in My Heart and was released on 21 March 2011. The album went straight to number one in the UK Classical Charts in the following week. His second album, Wynne, was released in 2013.

== Television and radio ==
=== Go.Compare ===
Since August 2009, Evans has starred in an advertising campaign for British insurance comparison website Go.Compare, playing the flamboyant, operatic tenor Gio Compario.

In 2012, Go.Compare launched the "Saving the Nation" campaign starring Evans again as Gio Compario. Evans made adverts in the series with Jimmy Carr, Sue Barker, Stuart Pearce, Ray Mears, Louie Spence and Stephen Hawking, with all of them trying to kill him and thus save the nation from his singing about Go.Compare.

Evans was dropped from the adverts in 2025.

=== Other work ===
In 2023 Evans won the eighteenth series of Celebrity MasterChef on BBC One. In August 2024, Evans was announced to be competing in the twenty-second series of Strictly Come Dancing. He was partnered with professional dancer Katya Jones. On 17 November 2024, Evans was voted off by the show's judges, becoming the eighth celebrity to be eliminated from the competition.

== Presenting and other ==
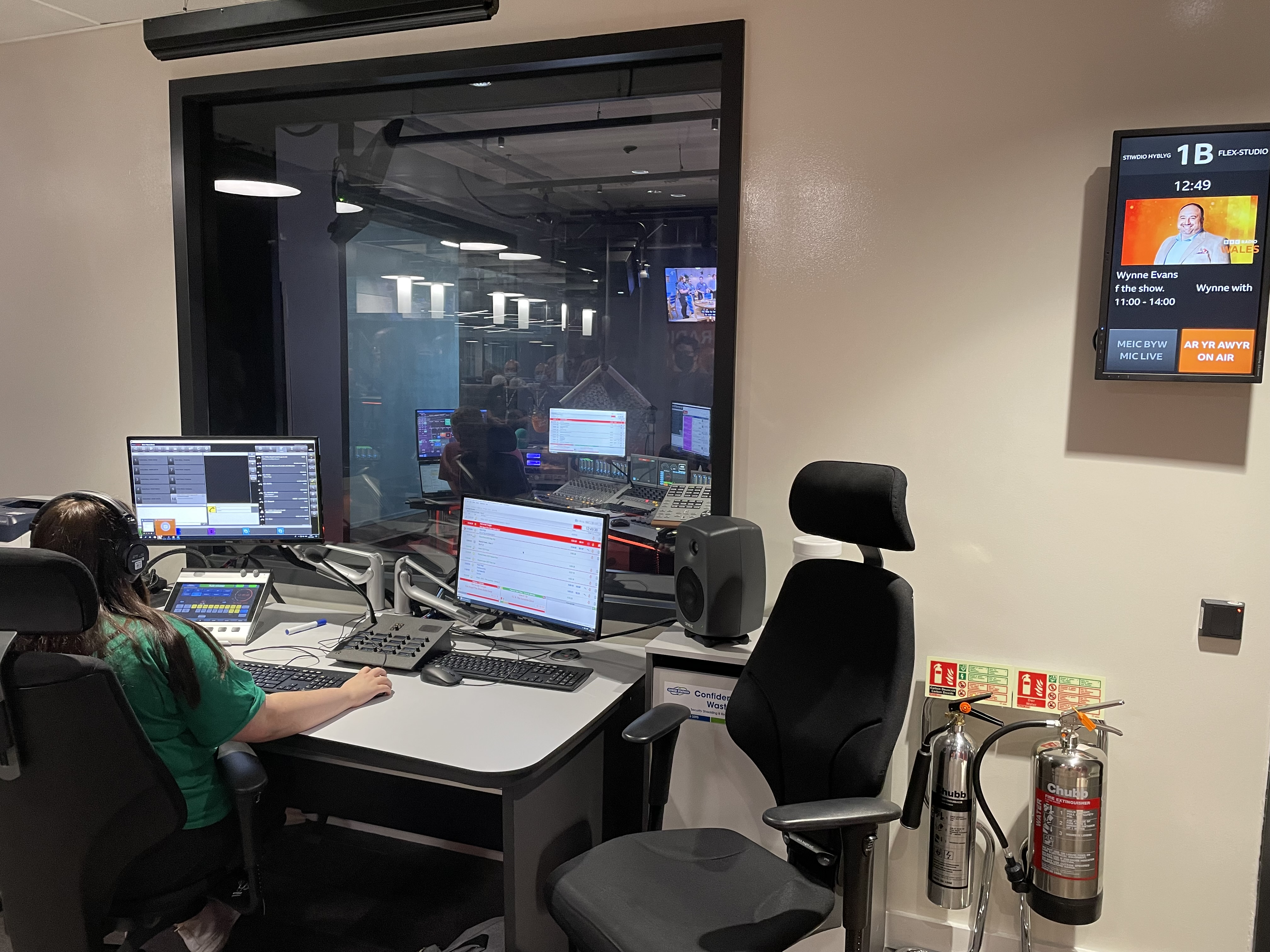
During production of Wynne Evans' BBC Wales radio show in New Broadcasting House, Cardiff

Evans began television presenting in 2011 with a programme for the BBC about the National Eisteddfod of Wales and with his own show on S4C. In 2012 he became a regular presenter on BBC Radio Wales and from October 2013 presented a weekly Friday afternoon show called Wynne Evans' Big Welsh Weekend. Between February 2016 and 23 June 2023, he presented The Wynne Evans Show on the station from 11 am to 2 pm every weekday. From 26 June 2023 the show moved to the 9 am to 12 pm slot.

Evans was also one of eight celebrities chosen to participate in an intense week of learning Welsh at a campsite in Pembrokeshire for the series cariad@iaith:love4language, shown on S4C in May 2012.

In 2012 he presented The Guide to Opera on Classic FM. The show was subsequently nominated for an Arqiva award. In 2013 Evans became a regular presenter on the station. He appeared on the football show Soccer AM in August 2012 and again in August 2013.

In March 2015, Evans appeared in the Sky1 comedy drama Stella. In 2016 he hosted the BBC One Wales programme Search for A* alongside other celebrities Behnaz Akhgar and Omar Hamdi.

On 28 January 2025, Evans apologised for making an "inappropriate and unacceptable" remark at the launch for the 2025 Strictly Live Tour. He announced that he would be taking time out, from both his BBC radio show and the tour, to "prioritise his wellbeing."

In May 2025, Evans publicly addressed controversy after accusations of making an inappropriate sexual remark about dancer Janette Manrara during a Strictly Live tour photocall. Evans denied the allegation, explaining that the comment was a misunderstood nickname for fellow contestant Jamie Borthwick and stated he was not misogynistic. Evans also clarified a separate incident, involving a "body language experiment" with dance partner Katya Jones, which was misinterpreted and later apologised for as a joke. Evans expressed regret over the situation and emphasised that he was not the person the accusations portrayed him to be.

== Awards ==
Evans was made a member of the Gorsedd of the Bards of Wales in 2012 and an Honorary Fellow of the University of Wales Trinity Saint David in 2013. He was also made a Member of the Order of Saint John by the Queen in 2008. Evans was awarded the British Empire Medal (BEM) in the 2022 Birthday Honours for services to Music, to Broadcasting and to Charity.

== Personal life ==
Evans is a trustee of the Elizabeth Evans Trust. Evans's mother was Elizabeth Evans MBE, who founded and ran both the Carmarthen Youth Opera and the Lyric Theatre in Carmarthen for 25 years. She died in 2004 and subsequently Evans and his two brothers founded the Trust. A film was later made about her life called Save the Cinema. Evans played a cameo in the film but also made the Behind the Curtain programme about his life for Sky Arts. Evans has two children and is divorced.
