= Wawffactor =

Welsh television music talent show

- Presented by: Eleri Sion
- Judges: Owen Powell; Bethan Elfyn; Aled Haydn Jones; Huw Chiswell
- Country of origin: Wales
- Original language: Welsh
- No. of series: 3

Production
- Producer: Alfresco

Original release
- Network: S4C
- Release: 2003 – 2006

Wawffactor (sometimes styled as WawFfactor, English: Wow Factor) is a Welsh television music talent show contested by aspiring pop singers drawn from public auditions. It was broadcast on S4C between 2003 and 2006 and was produced by Al Fresco.

It has now gained fame for contestant Duffy, now a major worldwide artist, who competed in the first series of the show, finishing second behind Lisa Pedrick.

== Format ==
Contestants initially performed in front of a panel of four judges at one of several auditions held around the country. From these, ten people were chosen to progress to the studio heats where after performing each week, one contestant would be eliminated by decision of the judges until three remained. Then during the live final, one contestant would be eliminated by the judges after performing, and a public televote decided the winner. The prize was to record an album and music video.

=== Judges ===
The four judges for the initial series were former Catatonia guitarist Owen Powell, singer & television presenter Emma Walford, musician Peredur ap Gwynedd and Radio 1 producer Aled Haydn Jones. Emma Walford was replaced by BBC Radio 1 DJ Bethan Elfyn for the second series, and Peredur ap Gwynedd was replaced by musician Huw Chiswell for the third series. The show was presented by Eleri Sion and Welsh singer-songwriter Caryl Parry-Jones acted as a vocal coach to the contestants from the studio heats onwards.

== History ==
The winner of the initial series was Lisa Pedrick, who beat Aimée Duffy and Beth Williams in the final. Duffy would go on to release a UK No. 1 album and single in 2009. The second series saw Rebecca Trehearn triumph over Francesca Hughes in the final. Lisa Haf Davies would have been the third finalist, but was forced to withdraw after contracting mumps. The third and final series was won by Einir Dafydd, who beat Aimee-Ffion Edwards and Nathan Whiteley.

== Winners ==
Year	Winner	Runner-up	Third finalist	Ref
2003/04	Lisa Pedrick	Aimée Duffy	Beth Williams	
2005	Rebecca Trehearn	Francesca Hughes	—^{[A]}	
2006	Einir Dafydd	Aimee-Ffion Edwards and Nathan Whiteley		

Notes

- A Lisa Haf Davies would have been third runner-up, however she withdrew due to contracting mumps
