= Wyre Davies =

Welsh journalist

Ifan Wyre Davies is a Welsh journalist, and South America correspondent for BBC News. He speaks fluent Welsh and Spanish.

== Background ==
His maternal grandfather, Captain Evan Rowlands of Llanon, was captain of Harmanteh, which whilst making passage between Brazil and the West Coast of Canada, on 22 May 1938 whilst under the control of a local pilot ran aground on Zealous Island, Messier Channel, Chile. Subsequently abandoned by her crew, salvage efforts were also abandoned on 6 June. Later he was captain of Stangrant, which during the Battle of the Atlantic was torpedoed and sunk west of the Outer Hebrides (58°27′N 12°36′W) by U-37 with the loss of eight of her 38 crew. Survivors including Captain Rowlands were rescued by a Short Sunderland aircraft of 10 Squadron, Royal Australian Air Force. Rowlands later retired to Llanrhystud, where Davies was born.

== Career ==
After studying Latin American politics at university, he joined BBC News where he became a foreign correspondent in Latin America. In 2000 he transferred to a job as correspondent at BBC Wales, reporting on stories across Wales and appearing on Wales Today together with the BBC's Six and Ten o'clock news. He also reported on sports stories.

In 2005, he was asked to fill in for Katya Adler for six months while she took maternity leave. He has since undertaken occasional assignments to both Palestine and Israel, and in April 2010 was appointed permanent Middle East correspondent, under fellow Welshman, BBC Middle East editor Jeremy Bowen. He covered the 2011 Egyptian protests from within Tahrir Square.

Since mid-2013, Davies is based in Rio de Janeiro, Brazil with his family, and is the BBC's South American correspondent.

== Personal life ==
Davies is married, with three daughters and one son. His close friends include BBC correspondent Alan Johnston, who was kidnapped in Gaza in 2007.
