= Katharine Everett =

Katharine Everett (Surrey, 3 July 1952–3 February 2009) was an English television executive and head at several units of the BBC. Her career began as a costume designer before assisting in the production of its science programmes. By the late 90s, she moved away from factual programming and more into new technologies.

== Early life ==
Katharine Everett was born in Surrey in 1952 and spent some of her childhood in Singapore under British rule. Upon returning to the UK, attending Wycombe Abbey School in Buckinghamshire and, later, studied English at Lady Margaret Hall at the Oxford University.

== Early career at the BBC ==
In 1975, she joined the BBC taking on minor roles largely at the BBC Television Centre, first at its wardrobe stockroom, later as a telephone enquiry clerk. Eventually she became a research assistant under the BBC's graduate trainee scheme.

== BBC producer ==
In 1980, she became a producer at the corporation, her first big credit was the biographical drama Oppenheimer. A few years later, in 1985, she specialised in producing factual science programmes: Your Life in Their Hands (1986), episodes of Q.E.D. on AIDS (1987) and synthetic fibres (1988) and, in 1989, joined the team behind Tomorrow's World. In 1990, she produced Life on One (presented by Sarah Greene and Simon Mayo) and the 1991 experiment Hospital Watch. Among the programmes she made for the Horizon strand between 1987 and 1993, a notable episode included The Iceman, about mummified remains found on the Italian-Austrian border in 1991.

== Career with BBC1 ==
In 1993, she moved from television production to become the BBC's budget negotiator for factual programming. In the next year, she became BBC1's finance director (amassing £648 million during her stint), then, in 1996, its head of commissions and development.

== BBC Choice ==
In 1997, she was appointed director of BBC Choice, the then-upcoming digital channel of the BBC. She gave the channel a budget of £20 million. Programmes she commissioned for the channel cost £10,000 to £20,000 per hour. Half of the total budget was to be used for original content. In September 1999, Stuart Murphy was appointed as her successor. Before leaving the post, she made a theme night poking fun at the success of Walking with Dinosaurs, which was not sanctioned by the Natural History Museum. This included the Doctor Who serial Invasion of the Dinosaurs and the film When Dinosaurs Ruled the Earth.

== New technologies ==
After leaving BBC Choice, she became the BBC's first controller of navigation and interactive television. She was involved in the joint BBC-TiVo agreement on 15 August 2000, as well as the upsize in interactive services for its Wimbledon coverage in 2001.

In 2001, she became controller of new media. Under this role, she oversaw the relaunch of the BBC's website into the BBCi brand. In July 2002, she was placed 96th in The Guardian's Media Guardian 100 list.

== Personal life ==
She married film editor Horacio Queiro in 1988, with which they had a son and a daughter.

On 3 February 2009, she died at age 56, after cancer complications.
