= Oliver Hides =

British radio presenter

Oliver Hides is a British radio presenter and former television presenter. He presents Good Morning Wales and the phone-in programme on BBC Radio Wales, and appears occasionally on BBC Radio 2.

== Background ==
Hides attended a primary school in Aberystwyth, followed by Christ College, Brecon. He then studied a Bachelor of Arts (with Honours) in Philosophy and Politics at the University of Southampton, before graduating with this degree.

== Career ==
Hides's first on-air job was commentating on a football match for Radio Ceredigion, which he had been volunteering for prior. Hides took up the position of sports reporter at BBC Sport in Wales in 1994.

In 2003, Hides presented coverage of international football on BBC Two in Wales and on the BBC's channel 2W. In 2004, Hides presented coverage football on BBC Two in Wales.

As of 2007, Hides presented sports programmes on BBC television in Wales and was a co-presenter of the drivetime news programme on BBC Radio Wales with Felicity Evans. Evans described the two as having different ways of approaching the presentation of some stories. Also in 2007, he regularly appeared as a presenter of the breakfast programme on the station. As of 2010, Hides had been presenting coverage of the Welsh Open snooker championships on BBC Two in Wales for a decade-long period. Hides continued to present and commentate on sport for BBC television in Wales until the early 2010s. In 2011, Hides narrated an episode of the BBC Wales current affairs television programme Week In Week Out.

As of 2011, Hides was a co-presenter of BBC Radio Wales's weekday breakfast programme Good Morning Wales. In 2013, Hides began presenting Morning Call, a phone-in programme about an important story in the day's news, on BBC Radio Wales.

As of 2015, Hides was a co-presenter with Louise Elliott of Good Morning Wales, which was broadcast from 6am on weekdays on BBC Radio Wales. He continued to present Morning Call in 2015.

From 2019 until 2023, Hides presented the breakfast programme on BBC Radio Wales on Fridays and Saturdays. The programme was broadcast between 6am and 8:30am in 2019. He began presenting the lunchtime phone-in programme on BBC Radio Wales on Thursdays and Fridays in 2023. Hides now co-presents Radio Wales Breakfast on Fridays and solo presents the programme on Saturdays. He sometimes stands in for Owain Wyn Evans on Evans's BBC Radio 2 early breakfast show.

== Personal life ==
In 2011, Hides co-organised a fundraising event for an appeal relating to the needs of miners in the Swansea Valley; the event raised over £2,000.
