= Claire Summers =

Welsh journalist

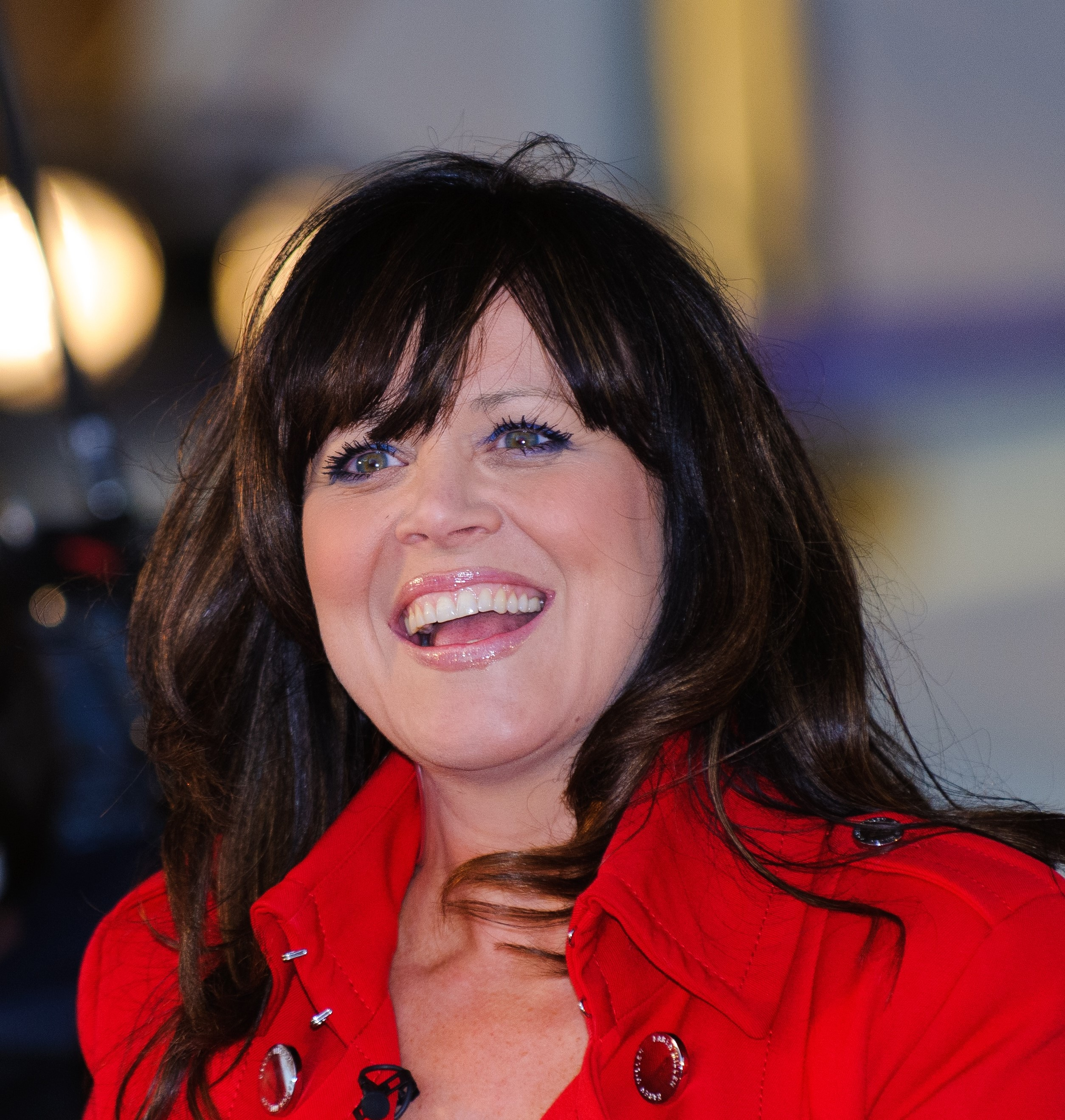
- Summers in 2012
- Born: Cardiff, Wales
- Education: Our Lady's Convent; Aberystwyth University; University of Cardiff
- Occupation(s): Newsreader, Presenter
- Agent: Elite Management
- Notable credit(s): BBC Wales; BBC Wales Today; Radio Wales Drive

Claire Summers is a Welsh television and radio news presenter employed by BBC Cymru Wales.

== Biography ==
Born in Cardiff, but brought up in Cowbridge, Summers was educated at Our Lady's Convent in Cardiff. She then gained a BA degree at Aberystwyth University, and a post-graduate degree in journalism from the University of Cardiff.

Summers worked at Channel One television in Bristol, where she reported, filmed, edited and presented programmes. Summers joined BBC Wales in 2000. With Summers and Jason Mohammad the youngest members of the BBC Wales Today team, they were often asked to undertake the activity-based reports – such as in 2005, where Summers had to lead a Welsh Black cow called Ceridwen at the Royal Welsh Show. On 8 September 2008, Summers became chief sports presenter for Wales Today.
