= Jonathan Hill (presenter) =

Welsh television presenter

Jonathan Hill is a Welsh television presenter, journalist and producer, who currently presents Wales at Six, the nightly news magazine programme on ITV Cymru Wales. He is also the editor of the station's English language output.

Hill, who studied English at Swansea University before specialising in journalism, started his career freelancing for BBC Radio Wales, before joining HTV Wales as a general news reporter and bulletin presenter in 1993 for HTV Newsdesk and Wales at Six. In February 1994, he was made one of the main presenters of Wales Tonight, and has since been the senior anchor for the station's main regional news programmes, including HTV News and ITV Wales News. He has also presented ITV News at 10 occasionally.

Hill has also presented and produced documentary programmes for ITV Wales, including the popular series Crime Secrets and Helicops (which has been shown latterly on Men & Motors and during ITV's Nightwatch with Steve Scott).

He has also contributed to the weekly current affairs programme, Wales This Week. In 2001, Hill was named BT Welsh Journalist of the Year for a Wales This Week report on convicted murderer Mark Shillibier and BT Welsh News Broadcaster of the Year for an interview with the Archbishop of Cardiff.

In May 2009, Hill was appointed as associate editor and executive producer for all of ITV Cymru Wales' programming. On 10 August 2013, he made his network debut presenting ITV News weekend bulletins on ITV and ITV News London. He continues to present national weekend bulletins on occasion.

In September 2013, Hill released his first book, based upon convicted serial killer John William Cooper - The Pembrokeshire Murders: Catching the Bullseye Killer was co-written with DCI Steve Wilkins, lead investigator of Operation Ottawa.
