= Lucy Owen =

British news reader (born 1971)

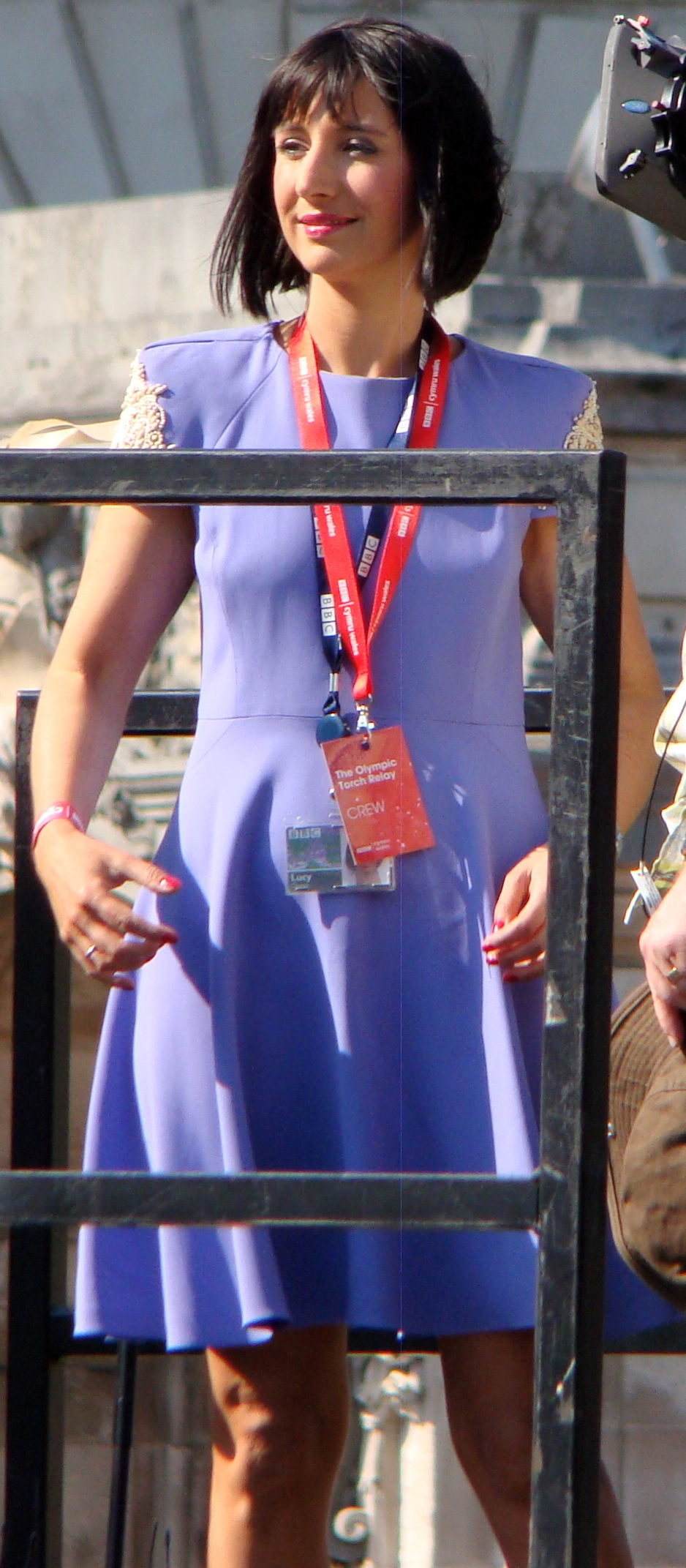
- Owen in 2012
- Born: Lucy Jane Cohen; June 18, 1971 (age 55); Llandaff, Cardiff, Wales
- Occupation: Newsreader
- Years active: 1991–present
- Notable credit(s): Wales Tonight; BBC Wales Today
- Spouse: Rhodri Owen (m. 2004)
- Children: 1

Lucy Owen (born Lucy Jane Cohen, 18 June 1971) is a Welsh television news reader.

== Career ==
Owen began her broadcasting career at BBC Radio Wales as a researcher, later progressing to a reporting and co-presenting role for a features programme. She joined HTV Wales in 1995 as a newsreader for regional opt-outs during GMTV, and between 1996 and 2007, she co-presented Wales Tonight, the regional news programme on ITV Wales, broadcast from Cardiff.

Owen presented on the now defunct ITV News Channel, and was also seen anchoring the main ITV News: Lunchtime News, Evening News and Weekend News. Owen signed off from her last edition of Wales Tonight on Friday 19 October 2007. From 5 November 2007, Owen began presenting the BBC Wales evening news programme BBC Wales Today, replacing long-standing presenter Sara Edwards. As a result of the channel move, Owen also joined her husband on the team of BAFTA award-winning X-Ray. Since 2016, she has co-hosted X-Ray with Rachel Treadway-Williams and comedian Omar Hamdi.

Owen was one of eight people chosen to participate in a week learning Welsh on a campsite in Pembrokeshire in the series cariad@iaith:love4language, shown on S4C in May 2012.

== Personal life ==
Owen married fellow Welsh television presenter Rhodri Owen in June 2004 at St Andrew's Church in St Andrews Major near Dinas Powys. The couple co-parent together in Cowbridge. After trying to conceive, the couple undertook treatment via IVF. Their child was born on 10 March 2008 by Caesarean section, weighing 5 lb 12oz (2.3 kg).

Owen has worked with St John Ambulance.

In 2023, Owen came close to losing her eyesight due to a detached retina, only discovering the problem during a routine eye test.
