= Teleri Bevan =

Welsh broadcaster (1931–2020)

Welsh broadcaster and author Teleri Bevan (1931–2020; aged 89) was the founding editor of BBC Radio Wales. She was also the author of three nonfiction books including Esmé: Guardian of Snowdonia (2014), a biography of Welsh conservationist Esmé Kirby.

== Early life and education ==
Bevan was born near Aberystwyth in Wales in 1931. She later studied at Bangor University in Bangor, Wales.

== Career ==
=== Journalism ===
Bevan began working for the BBC in 1955, where she acted as a presenter, producer, and editor. In 1978, Bevan was named the first editor of BBC Radio Wales. Her appointment to the role was a source of controversy, with some criticizing her decision to cancel the popular programme Good Morning Wales and replace it with a new morning programme titled AM. However, Bevan eventually increased in popularity.

In 1981, Bevan became the deputy head of programmes, and in 1985, she became the head of programmes for BBC Wales.

Throughout her career, Bevan interviewed a wide variety of influential people, including Tom Jones and Indira Gandhi.

=== Literature ===
After retiring from broadcasting, Bevan began a second career in nonfiction writing. In 2004, Bevan published a memoir of her broadcasting career titled Years on Air: Living with the BBC. Bevan's second book, The Ladies of Blaenwern (2010), told the history of the Welsh musical group The Dorian Trio, and was nominated for the January Book of the Month by the Welsh Books Council. In 2014, she published Esmé: Guardian of Snowdonia, a biography of Welsh conservationist Esmé Kirby.

== Death ==
Bevan died in November 2020.
