= Rebecca John =

Welsh presenter and reporter

Rebecca John (born 15 April 1970) is a presenter and reporter for Wales Today, BBC Wales on British television.

John was born in the Vale of Glamorgan, Wales. She read for a degree in French and German at Robinson College, Cambridge, between 1989 and 1993, before completing a postgraduate course in journalism at Trinity & All Saints College. Her first job was a news reporter and presenter at Swansea Sound. She moved to work for BBC Wales in 1994 working in radio news for three years before becoming a TV reporter and news presenter.

Rebecca has also started to learn Welsh and has appeared on the S4C Welsh learners programme, Welsh in a Week.
