= Rhodri Owen =

British broadcaster

- Born: Rhodri Owen; 20 September 1972 (age 53); Three Crosses, Gower, Swansea, Wales
- Occupation: Journalist
- Notable credit(s): BBC Radio Cymru, BBC Radio Wales, CBBC, Holiday
- Spouse: Lucy Owen (m. 2004)
- Children: Gabriel Owen
- Family: Geraint Owen (brother)

Rhodri Owen (born 20 September 1972) is a Welsh speaking radio and television presenter.

== Biography ==
Owen was born in Three Crosses, Gower, Swansea, and was brought up in Gowerton in a Welsh language speaking family. Welsh is his first language. Owen was also a member of the National Youth Theatre of Wales.

Owen started his career in radio reporting in his native Welsh language for Radio Cymru. After taking over the Saturday breakfast show, Owen transferred to the daily Red Dragon FM breakfast show. Having presented for BBC Radio 5 Live, Owen has also been the main station voice of BBC Radio Wales.

Owen started his television career with S4C in 1993 as a continuity announcer during children's programming, before appearing on a variety of programmes including children's magazine shows Noc Noc and Uned 5. After six years with the Welsh channel, he moved to London and joined CBBC, fronting children's consumer show Short Change. He went on to appear in the BBC Wales investigative consumer show X-Ray and was also the host of 4x4, BBC Three's Liquid Assets, and the BBC1 travel programme Holiday. He then spent three years on the rival ITV travel show Wish You Were Here...?, Holiday in Style for UK Style and BBC1's Hard Cash.

Owen is currently hosting Derek Acorah's Ghost Towns for Living TV. In 2016, he was replaced on the BAFTA award-winning X-Ray by comedian Omar Hamdi, due to his other filming commitments. In 2006, he also co-presented Britain's Dream Homes with Melissa Porter on BBC Two.

Owen had his first book published: Bwyd bwyd bwyd (Food food food)' – about healthy foods aimed at children. In 2009, he became presenter for afternoon magazine show Wedi 3 and studio director for Planed Plant, the current S4C children's continuity strand. In 2012 Wedi 3 relaunched as Prynhawn da, a 2 hour long programme, but this era was short lived and further changes were made in April 2012 when the programme was revamped back to a nearly identical format to Wedi 3. Rhodri continues to present.

=== Personal life ===
Rhodri married fellow Welsh television presenter Lucy Cohen in June 2004 at St Andrew's Church in St Andrews Major near Dinas Powys. After trying to conceive, the couple undertook treatment via IVF. Their child, Gabriel was born in March 2008 by Caesarean section, weighing 5 pounds 12 ounces (2.6 kg). The couple live together in Cowbridge. Rhodri's brother Geraint died on 11 July 2009.

Owen is close friends with Ian "H" Watkins and Gareth Thomas.
