= Sue Charles =

British weather presenter

Sue Charles is a Welsh TV and weather presenter for BBC Wales. Sue Charles presents the weather forecasts for Wales Today.

Born and educated in Llandrindod Wells, Powys, she took a holiday job with Radio Wyvern. She started out on the youth programme "Street Cred," and ended up producing and later as a stand-in Christmas news presenter.

Moving to BBC Radio 1, she became a music reporter, before moving to BBC Radio 2 in 1991, and then to BBC Radio Wales as a journalist.

In 1998 Charles made the move to television as a presenter on Wales Today. She joined the BBC Wales weather team in 2008.
