= Wales This Week =

Wales This Week is a long-running Welsh current affairs television programme produced by ITV Cymru Wales (formerly HTV Wales). The programme deals with a wide range of topics relating to the Welsh public, and is usually told through the eyes of those at the heart of the story.

Up until 1982, HTV Wales' bilingual news department had produced a number of current affairs programmes in both languages including Yr Wythnos, Welshscene and Outlook. Following the creation of S4C, a dedicated Welsh language television channel, HTV formed designated current affairs teams for the first time to produce two programmes - Y Byd ar Bedwar on S4C and Wales This Week on its parent channel.

The first edition of Wales This Week was broadcast on 23 September 1982 on HTV Wales. The first editor of the programme was Elis Owen, who was at the helm until 1994.

It has won a number of awards for its investigative journalism and was the first television programme to break the story of child abuse in North Wales Children's Homes during the 1980s.

In 2009, Professor Kevin Williams noted that the programme format was changing from that of "hard hitting journalism" to a format with "shorter, more light-hearted and less substantial stories" as a result of programme budget cuts by ITV.

As of 2017, the programme is presented by Andrea Byrne. Former presenters, producers and reporters include David Williams, Chris Segar, Bruce Kennedy, Clare Hudson, Judith Davies, Catrin Griffith, Paddy French, David Vickerman, Mai Davies, Hywel George, Helen Callaghan and Jonathan Hill.
