= BBC Choice =

British television channel (1998–2003)

- Logo used from 1998 to 2003

Programming
- Picture format: 576i (16:9 SDTV)

Ownership
- Owner: BBC
- Sister channels: BBC One; BBC Two; BBC Four; BBC News; BBC Parliament; BBC Knowledge (until 2002); CBBC; CBeebies

History
- Launched: 23 September 1998; 28 years ago
- Closed: 8 February 2003; 23 years ago
- Replaced by: BBC Three

Availability

Terrestrial
- Freeview: Channel 7

BBC Choice was a British digital television channel which was owned by the BBC and was launched on 23 September 1998. It was the first British television channel to broadcast exclusively in digital format, as well as the BBC's second non-analogue-terrestrial channel launch (following on from the BBC News channel in 1997).

At launch, BBC Choice was mainly used to supplement existing programming on BBC One and Two, with some low-profile original programming of its own. However, faced with low ratings for both Choice and its sister channel BBC Knowledge, in 2000, the BBC's digital strategy changed. Under new controller Stuart Murphy, the channel began to aim specifically at a young adult audience. The BBC decided to rebrand the channel with BBC Three, which, after some delay, began broadcasting in February 2003.

== History ==
=== Background ===
The BBC was intending to expand into the digital television market for a number of years, as their Director-General John Birt said, "The BBC has always been a pioneer of technology". Originally this was by their association with Flextech, which operated the UKTV network. Both companies had different ideas on how the channels would be run: the BBC wanted the channels branded as BBC channels, but Flextech wanted the channels to contain advertising. The BBC refused, stating that no domestic BBC channel should carry advertising.

In the end, a compromise was made: Two of the channels would launch as BBC channels: BBC Showcase, and BBC Learning (which became BBC Knowledge), with the remainder of the channels being launched as the UKTV network, intended to be BBC in all but name. Prior to the launch, the channel changed its name from BBC Showcase to BBC Choice. The channel was conceived as a catch-up channel when announced on 13 February 1997; it was set to carry repeats of the BBC's dramas such as EastEnders, as well as enhanced sports coverage and supplementary programmes to the ones shown on the two BBC channels.

Initially, the channel was planned to launch in the summer of 1998; however, after considerations that potential consumers would not have digital receivers until after summer, its launch was postponed to autumn that year. The BBC instead used the summer period to conduct digital test transmissions from the Crystal Palace transmitting station; set-top-boxes were reserved in this initial phase to politicians, BBC governors, media correspondents and ITC members. The test transmission would consist of a barker service with promotional material, which in June would be interspersed with World Cup matches from France, in widescreen. On 5 June, the channel was included in the then-upcoming Sky Digital package, following the formalisation of the BBC-Sky deal. The BBC digital test transmissions, featuring a limited version of BBC Choice, started broadcasting on 10 June; this version carried 27 out of the 64 matches in widescreen, the first being the group match between Scotland and Brazil. Neil Oughton, a producer at Sky Sports, was appointed its sports leader during the World Cup.

At the end of June, it was revealed that the channel would operate at a budget of £20 million, comparable to an average cable and satellite channel at the time. Half of the budget would be used for original programming.

=== Launch ===
On 30 August 1998, at the Edinburgh International Television Festival, it was announced that the channel would launch on 23 September 1998. All four BBC channels started their digital broadcasts at 12pm that day.

When BBC Choice launched on 23 September 1998, no digital television receivers were available to the general public as Sky Digital and ONdigital were not launched yet. Instead, the launch programme was broadcast over the internet, with the launch day's schedule including a Tomorrow's World guide to digital television and repeats of the first episodes of EastEnders and Monty Python's Flying Circus. The opening line-up was repeated on 1 October with the commercial launch of Sky Digital.

The main format of the channel was a mix of BBC One and Two programming as well as original programming such as Backstage, broadcast live each weeknight, which took viewers behind the scenes of different parts of the BBC. The channel also provided exclusive coverage of music festivals such as Glastonbury and extended live coverage of sport, for when either BBC One or Two had to end their coverage early or their schedules are unable to provide live sport coverage.

BBC Choice also introduced an innovative programme format known as "Hotlink", which expanded on popular shows. Examples included Watchdog Extra, where viewers could contact the show by phone or email with either questions or feedback on the issues discussed. Crimewatch Extra provided follow-up detail on the cases involved in the main programme, and Row Z was a football discussion forum that aired after Match of the Day finished on BBC One. The "Hotlink" format was also adopted by many other channels, particularly both ITV2 and E4.

BBC Choice initially broadcast from 5 pm daily; this later switched to 7 pm. The 7 pm start continued into its successor BBC Three.

=== Children's programming ===
BBC Choice also aired children's programmes, which were transferred to CBBC and CBeebies when they launched on 11 February 2002.

For the first year of BBC Choice, children's programming would air on weekend afternoons as CBBC Choice, and included strands like "Dog & Dinosaur", "The Crew Room", "L&K Replay" and "Re:Peter". From 29 November 1999, this was supplanted with a daily CBBC on Choice strand, running from 6 am to 7 pm each day, for programmes aimed at preschool children, with presentation links prerecorded by a CBBC presenter. It included repeats of archive shows rarely seen on the main channels, such as the first few series of Bodger & Badger, Mr Benn, Paddington, Simon and the Witch, Ivor the Engine, Jonny Briggs, Pigeon Street, and Bitsa. This continued until February 2002, when the CBBC and CBeebies channels launched, with the CBBC channel airing on BBC Choice's daytime broadcast bandwidth, but occupying a separate EPG position.

=== Refocus to young adults ===
In June 2000, the BBC radically changed its digital channel formats. The initial format had BBC Choice target a similar mixed audience to BBC One and Two with a focus on general entertainment, with BBC Knowledge focusing on educational and informative programming. From 2000, both Knowledge and Choice became targeted to more specific audiences, with Knowledge moving to a broader documentary and culture mix and Choice focusing on developing a stronger relationship with the young adult audience, which historically the BBC had difficulty reaching. BBC Choice abandoned many of its original programmes such as Backstage, and aimed at younger people, with most of the early part of the schedules featuring fifteen-minute programmes under the banner of "Refreshing TV" or "Micro TV". Entertainment news magazine Liquid News, presented by Christopher Price, evolved out of News 24's Zero 30 and became the channel's flagship show.

=== Closure and replacement ===
In August 2000, the BBC announced that it would replace BBC Choice with BBC Three on a then-undetermined date, which would become a continuation of the youth aspect of BBC Choice. But the government delayed approving BBC Three, which formed part of wider plans to reshape the BBC's digital provision, plans which also included the proposed BBC Four, two children's channels, and five digital radio stations. Although BBC Three was delayed, the other proposals gained the approval of Parliament and the channels went on air in 2002, meaning BBC Four launched prior to BBC Three. From October 2001, BBC Choice began screening a significant amount of new, young-skewing programming, which had been targeted for BBC Three.

The BBC submitted a revised proposal for the channel raised the target age range to 25–34 and increased the amount of factual and arts programming, with a nightly 15-minute news programme, the BBC hoped these changes would better illustrate how BBC Three would differ from rivals such as E4, ITV2 and Sky One. This proposal for BBC Three was approved in September 2002, with a set of public-service conditions completed and a launch date set for February 2003. The final night of BBC Choice entirely featured previews of BBC Three's programming.

== Programming ==
Initially, the main attractions of BBC Choice were multi-broadcast television shows, with the option to choose which programme the viewer wanted to watch. The first broadcast by the BBC with this option was two months after the launch of the channel, showing Stressed Eric, with Naked Video as the Digital Teletext option. In addition, BBC Choice also aired new episodes of some series, such as Robot Wars, before their first broadcast on the terrestrial BBC channels.

The channel's single-show programming was mainly concerned with celebrities, including documentary profiles and the nightly entertainment magazine Liquid News. EastEnders Revealed (premiered on 4 February 1999) was the only show from the original 1998 channel lineup to survive and outlive the channel itself, transferring to its successor, BBC Three.

It also aired sport programmes, but the decision faced criticism from media analysts because, by airing them on BBC Choice and not the two main BBC channels, it would be seen by fewer viewers (such was the case with the 1999 Australian Open, the first on British television with on-screen presenters).

=== Regional variations ===
BBC Choice had regional variations for Wales, Scotland and Northern Ireland which were broadcast in place of the network BBC Choice service in their respective areas from 10:30 pm (following the EastEnders replay) to midnight nightly. At the time the BBC's digital offering included the national variants of BBC One (England, Scotland, Wales, Northern Ireland) and a single nationwide BBC Two.

The regional variations of Choice were discontinued on 31 March 2001, in favour of introducing regional opt-outs on BBC Two to digital services from 30 April; in some cases, such as BBC 2W in Wales, analogue and digital versions of BBC Two were separately scheduled, but by 2010, all differences between the analogue and digital variants of BBC Two were discontinued, and one version of the channel is available in each area, broadcasting on digital platforms. The English regional variants of BBC One were launched digitally in 2003.

Since the closure of the BBC Choice splits, all BBC digital channels (including Choice's successor BBC Three) have operated as UK-wide services with no regional opt-out functionality.

== Operation ==
The channel controllers were:

- 1997–2000: Katharine Everett (appointed before launch; died 2009)
- 2000–2003: Stuart Murphy

Murphy continued with its successor BBC Three.

== Identity ==
At launch, BBC Choice's identity featured idents with three different objects sharing a common theme or word. These were:

- Fan: a football fan, a paper fan and an electric fan
- Punch: a bowl of punch, Mr. Punch and a boxing glove
- Mouse: a toy mouse, a computer mouse, a real mouse

The goal of this package was to play with the idea that BBC Choice, by complementing BBC One and Two, was the BBC's third general interest channel.
