= Wales at Six =

Welsh national television news programme

- Also known as: ITV News Cymru Wales; Good Morning Wales; ITV Wales News (2004-2005); HTV News (1999-2004); Wales Tonight (1994-1999, 2005-2013); Report Wales (1968–1982)
- Genre: National and regional news
- Presented by: Andrea Byrne; Jonathan Hill
- Starring: Ruth Dodsworth (weather)
- Countries of origin: Wales, United Kingdom
- Original language: English

Production
- Executive producers: Zoe Thomas (Head of News and Programmes)
- Production locations: Cardiff Bay, Cardiff, Wales
- Camera setup: Multi-camera
- Running time: 30 minutes
- Production companies: HTV (1968–2002); Carlton Television (2002–2004); ITV Cymru Wales (2004–)

Original release
- Network: Harlech/HTV Cymru Wales/HTV Wales (1968–2002); ITV1 (ITV Cymru Wales) (2002–)
- Release: 1968 – present

Related
- ITV News; ITV Weather; Sharp End; Wales This Week

ITV News Wales at Six is the evening news programme broadcast and produced by ITV Cymru Wales.

== Overview ==
Wales at Six and all other ITV Wales news programming is broadcast live from studios at Assembly Square in Cardiff Bay, with a North Wales newsroom based in Colwyn Bay, and a political unit at the Senedd in Cardiff Bay. District reporters are also based in West Wales, Merthyr Tydfil and Swansea.

Jonathan Hill was promoted from news reporter and newsreader to a main anchor for the main evening news programme during February 1994. Andrea Byrne was appointed co-anchor on 14 January 2008 following the departure of Lucy Owen to rival programme BBC Wales Today. Hill and Byrne anchor alternating editions of the main 6pm programme as of June 2014. Kylie Pentelow took over from Byrne on 4 February 2019 for one-year. Ruth Dodsworth fronts national weather forecasts for ITV Cymru Wales since 2000.

== History ==
From the launch of Harlech Television in May 1968, the company produced a full-scale bilingual news service - the only of its kind in the ITV network. The 6pm weekday slot for regional news was shared by two programmes - Y Dydd (The Day) in the Welsh language and Report Wales in English.

The launch of S4C in November 1982 signalled the end of Welsh language news from HTV, although the company continues to produce Welsh current affairs programmes, including the long-running Y Byd ar Bedwar (The World on Four).

Wales at Six replaced Report Wales as a full-length English language news programme on Monday 1 November 1982. HTV's news service was based at its Pontcanna studios until moving to the Television Centre at Culverhouse Cross in 1990. Wales at Six was latterly replaced by Wales Tonight in 1994 and 2005, HTV News in 1999, ITV Wales News in 2004 and ITV News Cymru Wales in 2013.

On 17 September 2013, ITV Wales announced it would launch a weekly 30-minute current affairs programme, Newsweek Wales, featuring interviews, analysis and a look back at the week's main news stories in Wales. The new programme, broadcast on Sunday lunchtimes, was launched on Sunday 22 September 2013. A previous plan to extend the weekday late bulletin to 15 minutes was scrapped.

On Saturday 28 June 2014, ITV Cymru Wales broadcast from its Culverhouse Cross studios for the last time. Two days later, broadcasting began from its new base at Cardiff Bay. As part of the move, Wales at Six was revived as the title for the main 6pm programme on weekdays, after an absence of 20 years.

Preceded by Scotland Today	RTS: Television Journalism; Regional Daily News Magazine; 2002	Succeeded by BBC Wales Today
