= Vincent Kane =

Welsh broadcaster and writer

Vincent Kane OBE (born 1935) is a Welsh broadcaster and writer, known primarily for his career with the BBC. He was chairman of the Wales Quality Centre, the International Festival of Musical Theatre and the Cardiff Initiative.

== Biography ==
Kane was born in Cardiff in 1935. In 1960, speaking with Mary O'Neill, he won The Observer Mace, representing Cardiff University.

Kane is best known for his work as a BBC broadcaster, with whom he worked for almost 36 years. He presented television programmes such as Wales Today and Week in Week Out and was on radio in Good Morning Wales and Meet For Lunch (BBC Radio Wales). He has been called "the Jeremy Paxman of Wales" because of his searching interview techniques, though he was already a well-known figure in Wales before Paxman made his name on national television. Kane began as a reporter on Wales Today in 1962, and went on to become the first host of Week in Week Out in 1964, presenting the weekly current affairs programme. He returned to host Wales Today from 1986 to 1993, and eventually left BBC Wales in 1998.

In June 1988 Kane was honoured for services to broadcasting in Wales, becoming an Officer of the Most Excellent Order of the British Empire (OBE). After his retirement from broadcasting, in 1999 BAFTA Wales gave him a Lifetime achievement award for his outstanding contribution to broadcasting.

Kane founded the Wales Quality Centre and, almost 30 years later, retired from the role of chairman in December 2012.

In recent years he published a book on the romantic impulses of older people.

Now in later life, Vincent lives with his wife in Cyprus.
