= Frances Donovan =

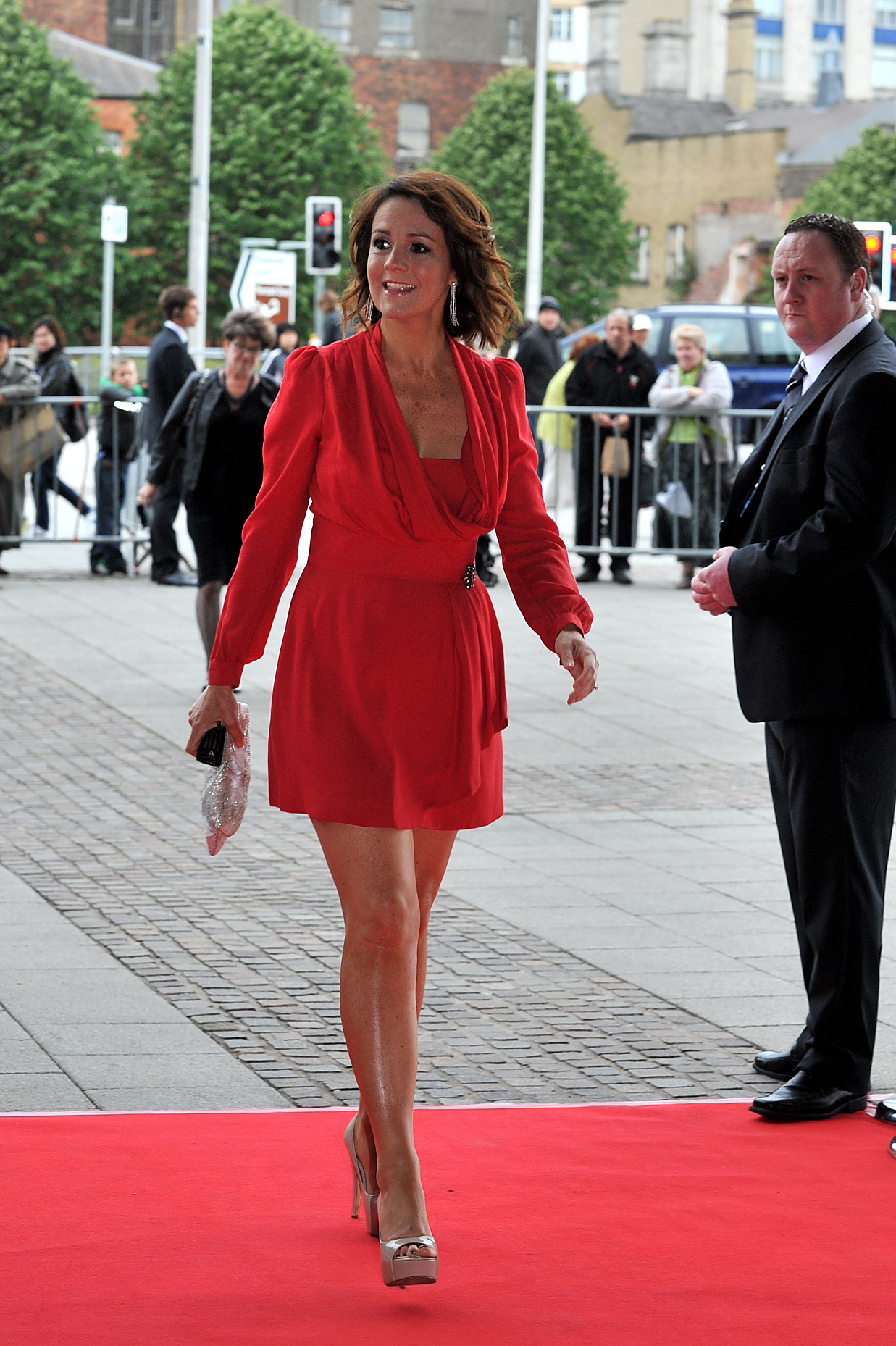
- Fran Donovan at the BAFTAS in 2011
- Born: Cardiff, Wales
- Education: Haberdashers' Monmouth School for Girls; University College, Cardiff
- Spouse: Andrew Cottey

Frances Donovan is a journalist and presenter on television and radio, including anchoring the Rugby World Cup, the Olympics, the Commonwealth Games and the BAFTAS.

== Career ==
Donovan began her career as a radio reporter and presenter at 210FM in Reading before moving to Severn Sound Radio in Gloucester. Her first television role was a reporter at HTV West in Bristol, from where she went on to work for ITN, Sky, Channel 5 and Meridian Television. She was also a regular sports presenter on what was then News24 for the BBC. She returned to Wales to become one of BBC Wales Sport's main anchors, where she hosted Wales on Saturday – the weekend results show – for four years, as well as BBC Sports Personality of the Year, Wales Open Golf, Welsh Open Snooker, International Bowls and Welsh Amateur Boxing. She was the first female presenter of BBC Wales' rugby programme, Scrum Five. She has reported for Match of the Day and Football Focus as well as The Open Championship for the BBC and has also fronted the sports news on BBC Breakfast. She is also the host of ITV Wales' sport chat show in Touch, interviewing sports figures like Ole Gunnar Solskjær, Chris Coleman, Gareth Edwards, Craig Bellamy, Matthew Maynard, Garry Monk and Malky Mackay. Donovan is also a regular reporter for Premier League Productions, the television arm of the Barclays Premier League. She hosted ITV Sport's LV Cup programming for the first time in 2015 and will be part of the ITV network team covering the 2015 Rugby World Cup. She anchored ITV Wales' coverage of the 2011 Rugby World Cup and reprised that role for the 2015 tournament.

Away from sport, Donovan has co-anchored both Wales Tonight and The West Tonight for ITV. She tackled the business world for ITV Wales in The Secrets of My Success and indulged her love of history and the outdoors fronting History Hunters for the BBC. She conceived and helped develop the idea of 'Give a Dog a Home' – a formatted show looking to pair rescue dogs with new families – and co-presented the BBC Wales series with Benji Webbe, lead singer of Skindred. She was one of the main presenters of Children in Need for BBC Wales for seven years and also hosted a seven-hour long Outside Broadcast from Cardiff Castle to mark the Queen's Jubilee. Donovan presented ITV's arts and entertainment programme The Wales Show for several years, interviewing Ricky Gervais, Catherine Zeta Jones and Rhys Ifans amongst others. She climbed a 100 ft telegraph pole and took part in the Pony Club mounted games during her time as one of the faces of the BBC's coverage of the Royal Welsh Show.

She is also the host of the sports quiz 'Extra Time' for BBC Radio Wales and is a regular guest anchor for the mid-morning phone-in show and the afternoon magazine programme.

== Charity ==
Donovan works with a number of charities on animal rights. In March 2012, she took on the First Nation Home challenge for Sport Relief as the only female competing member of Team Wales. Captained by Gethin Jones, they raced teams from Ireland, Scotland and England around the UK, cycling, running, sailing and rowing in the quest to be the First Nation Home. She is also an ambassador for the Welsh Football Trust and St John Cymru.
