= BBC Choice Wales =

- Country: Wales
- Network: BBC Choice

Ownership
- Owner: BBC Cymru Wales
- Sister channels: BBC One Wales; BBC Two Wales

History
- Launched: 23 September 1998; 28 years ago
- Closed: 30 March 2001; 25 years ago
- Replaced by: Digital version of BBC Two Wales (featuring BBC 2W from 2001 to 2009)

Availability (at time of closure)

Terrestrial
- DTT: Channel 7

BBC Choice Wales was the national variation for BBC Cymru Wales of the BBC Choice service, that was broadcast by the BBC. The channel was announced, as were the two other national versions, in June 1998, and launched alongside the other BBC Choice variants on 23 September 1998.

== Programming ==
As with the local variants of BBC Choice in Northern Ireland and Scotland carried much of its content from the network BBC Choice service originating in London, but split off most evenings for around two hours a night (generally around 10pm to midnight) of local programming to Wales. When the EastEnders rebroadcast aired at 10pm, local programming would begin at 10.30pm. After around midnight, programming would revert to the network service until closedown.

The channel provided more English-language content produced by BBC Wales, in addition to that, it gave chances for new talent, giving Alex Jones her first job as a presenter upon winning an audition; while Frances Donovan also worked throughout the channel's existence.

In October 1999, a half-hour news bulletin, BBC Choice News, was added at 10pm, when BBC Wales updated its news graphics and set. During the 2000–01 Heineken Cup, it broadcast opt-outs simulcasting the matches seen on BBC Two.

== Closure and replacement ==
Its broadcasts ceased on 30 March 2001, being replaced by a fully networked BBC Choice. The channel was then itself replaced from 2003 by BBC Three, which has never had any regional variants. On 30 April 2001, BBC Two's variants for Scotland, Wales and Northern Ireland were made available to digital viewers (previously a single UK-wide version of BBC Two had been available on digital platforms). The Welsh feed would house BBC 2W from 5 November 2001 to 2 January 2009.
