= BBC Wales Today =

Welsh national television news programme

- Title card used since April 2022
- Theme music composer: David Lowe
- Country of origin: United Kingdom
- Original language: English

Production
- Producers: BBC News; BBC Cymru Wales
- Production locations: BBC Cymru Wales New Broadcasting House, Cardiff, Wales, UK
- Camera setup: Multi-camera
- Running time: 30 minutes (main 6:30 pm programme); 10 minutes (1:30 pm and 10:30 pm programmes); Various (on weekends and Breakfast)

Original release
- Network: BBC One Wales
- Release: 17 September 1962 – present

Related
- ITV News: Wales at Six; Cardiff News; Newyddion

BBC Wales Today is the BBC's national television news programme for Wales, broadcast on BBC One Wales from the headquarters of BBC Cymru Wales in Central Square, Cardiff. According to the BBC, it is the world's longest-running television news programme.

The programme can be watched in any part of the UK (and Europe) on digital satellite channel 972 on the BBC UK regional TV on satellite service. Selected video packages from the programme are available on the BBC news website.

== History ==
The programme began at 6:10 pm on Monday 17 September 1962. Its predecessor, a short News from Wales bulletin, started in 1957 and was originally presented by Michael Aspel. The new programme, originally presented by Brian Hoey, shared a 25-minute timeslot for regional news with Points West from Bristol – at the time, both programmes were broadcast to Wales and the West of England from the Wenvoe transmitter near Cardiff.

By February 1964, two new television regions, BBC Wales and BBC West, had been created with the addition of a new channel (13) for Wales on Wenvoe. BBC Wales Today thus became a 25-minute programme broadcast only to Wales while Points West was only broadcast to the West of England. In 1969, the opening of separate UHF transmitters at Wenvoe (Wales) and Mendip (West) led to complete separation, except for overlap areas in South Wales.

Between September 1984 and September 1988, the programme aired at 5:35 pm – one hour earlier than most of its counterpart BBC news programmes elsewhere in the UK – before moving to the 6:30 pm timeslot in September 1988. BBC Wales Today shared the same studio facilities (studio C2 at Broadcasting House in Cardiff) as S4C's Newyddion programme.

On 28 September 2020, BBC Wales Today joined BBC Cymru Wales' presentation and radio teams at new headquarters in Central Square, in Cardiff's city centre. The first bulletin from the building was coverage of the Welsh Government daily COVID-19 pandemic briefing.

== On air ==
On weekdays, BBC Wales Today broadcasts six three-minute bulletins at 27 and 57 minutes past each hour during BBC Breakfast. A 10-minute lunchtime programme airs at 1:35 pm during the BBC News at One, with a short preview at 5:15 pm. The main half-hour edition of the programme airs at 6:30 pm after following the BBC News at Six. The late night bulletin airs at 10:30 pm following the BBC News at Ten.

Three bulletins air during the weekend: early evening bulletins on Saturdays and Sundays, and a late-night bulletin on Sundays, following the BBC Weekend News.

From November 2001, a fifteen-minute news bulletin was broadcast on the digital opt-out service BBC 2W, first as 2W News and Sport and later, Wales Today on 2W. The bulletin was axed in 2007.

In 2020 a separate 30-minute broadcast was added to the schedule during the 2019 Coronavirus outbreak, reporting on live Welsh Government press conferences.

=== Notable on-air team ===
Presenters

Person	Position
Lucy Owen	Main presenters
Nick Servini	Main presenters
Jennifer Jones	Main presenters
Rebecca John	Relief presenters
Claire Summers	Relief presenters

=== Weather presenters ===
Weather Team
Person	Position
Derek Brockway	Main weather presenter
Behnaz Akhgar	Weather presenters
Sue Charles	Weather presenters

=== Former presenters ===
- Sara Edwards
- Kevin Owen
- Jamie Owen
- Patrick Hannan (deceased)
- Bob Humphrys (deceased)
- Vincent Kane
- Jason Mohammad
- Chris Morgan (deceased)
- David Parry-Jones (deceased)
