= Sally Collins =

Professor of Obstetrics

Sally Collins BSc BMBCh DPhil FRCOG
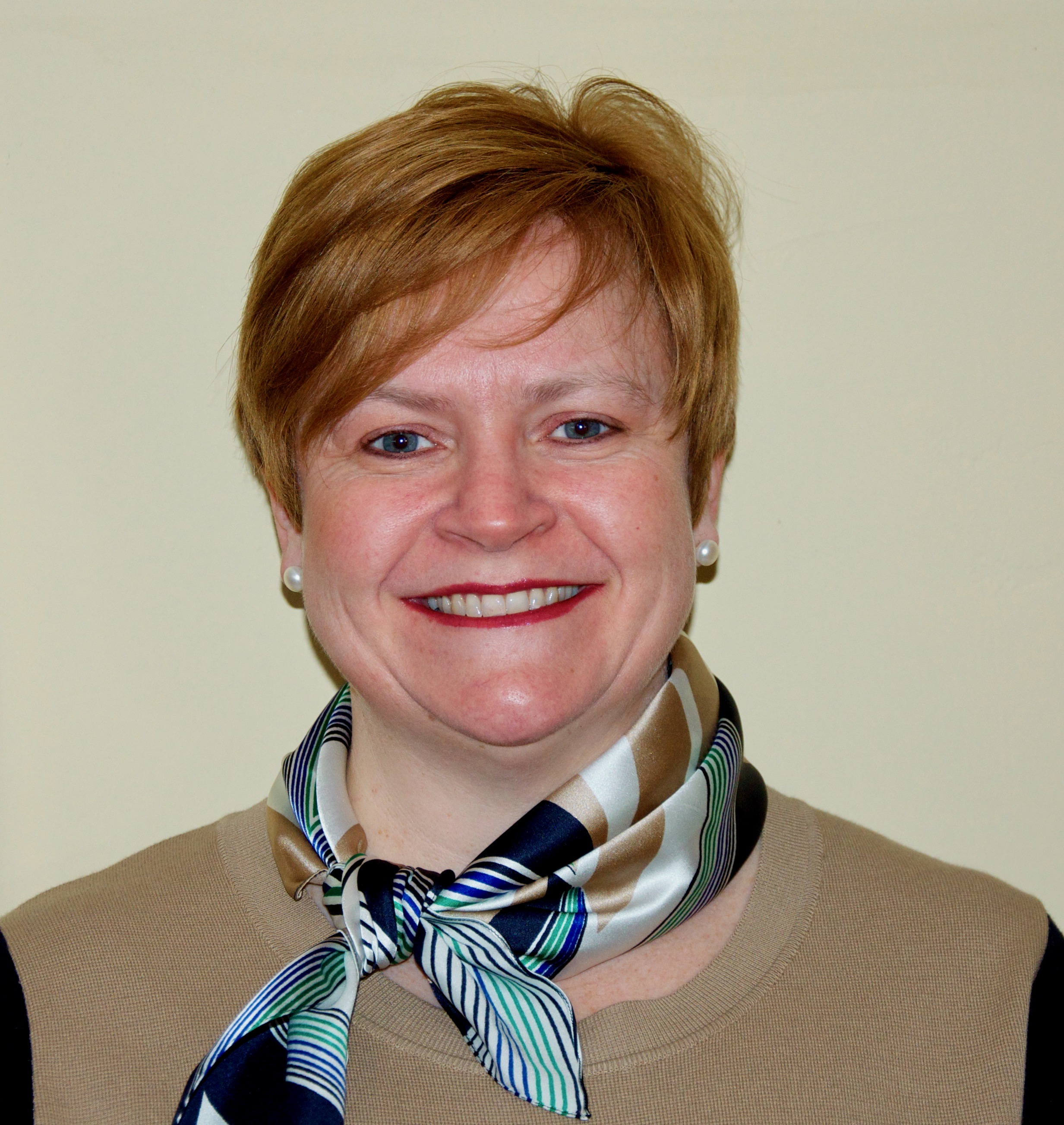
- Born: Sarah Louise Collins; January 1969 (age 57)
- Occupations: Professor of Obstetrics and Consultant Obstetrician
- Title: Professor

Academic background
- Education: Beresford House School, Eastbourne
- Alma mater: University of East Anglia (BSc); Mountview Academy of Theatre Arts (Dip Th Arts); University of Oxford (BMBCh, D.Phil)
- Thesis: Development of placental ultrasound markers to screen for the term, small for gestational age (SGA) baby (2012)
- Doctoral advisor: Alison Noble

Academic work
- Discipline: Placenta accreta spectrum Placental imaging Medical image analysis Evidence based Medicine; Pain research
- Institutions: University of Oxford; Birmingham Women's Hospital; Oxford University Hospitals NHS Foundation Trust

Sally L. Collins BSc BMBCh DPhil FRCOG is a Professor of Obstetrics in the Nuffield Department of Women's and Reproductive Health, University of Oxford and a Consultant Obstetrician and lead for the Placenta Accreta Service at Birmingham Women's Hospital. She is also a lecturer in Medical Sciences at St. Anne's College, University of Oxford. She is reported by ExpertScape to be one of the top 3 world experts in placenta accreta spectrum.

Collins was a researcher in the Oxford Pain Research Unit, Nuffield Department of Anaesthetics, University of Oxford (1996-1999) and a professional actress (1990-1996).

She is the lead author of Oxford Handbook of Obstetrics and Gynecology (2nd, 3rd & 4th Editions) and co-wrote Obstetric Medicine, one of the first books in the Oxford Specialist Handbooks in Obstetrics and Gynaecology series for which she is Series Editor.

== Early life and education ==
Collins was educated at Beresford House School for Girls in Eastbourne was an undergraduate at the University of East Anglia, Norwich where she was awarded a BSc (Hons) in Chemistry in 1990. She then went on to Mountview Academy of Theatre Arts in London where she completed a Postgraduate Diploma in Theatre Arts.

Collins studied preclinical medicine at St Hilda's College, University of Oxford where she was awarded a distinction in her 1st BM and the 1999 Nuffield Prize for Medicine. She went on to study Clinical Medicine at Green Templeton College, University of Oxford where she was awarded a Baber Studentship and the Hobson Mann Clinical Medicine Scholarship. She graduated from the Oxford University Clinical Medical School in 2002 with a BMBCh.

Collins trained in Obstetrics and Gynaecology in the Thames Valley Deanery during which time she completed a Doctor of Philosophy degree (D.Phil.) in 2012 at the University of Oxford. Her thesis examined automated ultrasound imaging of the placenta and was supervised by Alison Noble. She completed her Sub-Specialist Training in Maternal-Fetal Medicine in 2013.

== Career ==
On graduating from Mountview Academy of Theatre Arts Collins started her career as a professional actress appearing in several stage productions as well as Thames Television's series 'The Bill' and a BBC 999 Lifesaver's special.

In 1996 she left acting and joined the team at the Pain Research Unit, Nuffield Department of Anaesthetics, University of Oxford. Here she developed several practical methods to enable the meta-analysis of pain studies, most notably a tool which allows comparison between a visual analogue pain scale and categorical pain scores. During this time she published numerous Cochrane Reviews of a variety of analgesics and significantly contributed to the Oxford Ladder of Analgesic Efficacy.

Collins was the Clinical Lead for Obstetrics for AirBorn, the UK's first perinatal air ambulance service (2011-2016). Through this role, she became the repatriation advisor to the British military. During her time in these roles she organised, and often personally flew on, numerous missions to repatriate peripartum British citizens and British military personnel from destinations including Kazakhstan, Gibraltar and Camp Bastion.

Collins worked in The Fetal Medicine Unit, John Radcliffe Hospital between 2014 and 2023 as a Consultant Obstetrician and Sub-Specialist in Fetal Medicine. During this time she set up and led the FMU Placenta Clinic which offered diagnosis and management of Placenta Accreta Spectrum (PAS) to the Thames Valley and beyond. She remains the Obstetric lead for the Oxford Placenta Accreta Team (OxPAT) but since 2024 has been a Consultant Obstetrician and lead for the Placenta Accreta Service at Birmingham Women's Hospital. She has been working with NHS England since 2016 to develop a nationwide network of specialist centres for the management of PAS to improve diagnosis and management of this rare and life-threatening condition. She has also authored several national and international guidelines on the diagnosis and management of PAS for the RCOG, FIGO and the IS-PAS (formerly EW-AIP then IS-AIP).

She was promoted to Professor of Obstetrics at the University of Oxford in 2022. In 2017, she joined St Anne's College, University of Oxford as a Lecturer in Medical Sciences. She was also Medical Lead for Women's Health at Perspectum Diagnostics between 2020 and 2023.

Collins is a member of the international editorial board of Placenta, having previously been on the editorial boards of Acta Obstetricia et Gynecologica Scandinavica and BMC Pregnancy and Childbirth. She is the Chair of the International Society for PAS (IS-PAS).

=== Research ===
Whilst working at the Pain Research Unit, Nuffield department of Anaesthetics, University of Oxford, Collins developed several practical Evidence Medicine tools which enable the meta-analysis of pain studies and provided the pioneering research for the Oxford Ladder of Analgesic Efficacy. She is the author of several Cochrane reviews including the review of sterile water for back pain in labour. This led to her being the UK PI for ICARIS a multicentre, randomised controlled trial which finally demonstrated the analgesic efficacy of intra-cutaneous sterile water for back pain in labour.

Collins has collaborated with Gordon N. Stevenson in the field of image analysis since her D.Phil. and they have multiple publications together, notably in 3D power Doppler ultrasound (3D-PD US) methodology and application to placental imaging. Her work with Kypros Nicolaides of the Fetal Medicine Foundation led to the development of the original fully convolutional neural network (OxNNet) which can automatically segment the placenta from a 3D ultrasound volume. Collins and her team have developed several fully automated tools (the OxNNet Toolkit) for assessment of first trimester placental morphology and vascularity with the ultimate aim of developing a multifactorial risk prediction model for fetal growth restriction and pre-eclampsia later in pregnancy. The work of Collins, Stevenson and Alec (William) Welsh on power Doppler (PD) ultrasound has led to the development of the first standardised technique for quantitative estimation of perfusion in 3D which has now been validated in an animal model.

She has also published on computational modelling of the placenta, working with a Mathematics in Medicine collaboration between the University of Oxford and University of Manchester to develop a stochastic model for early placental development. Her recent study modelling placental vascularity with Alys Clark and Joanne James at the University of Auckland, challenges the dogma regarding the origin of the changes seen in the uterine artery waveform, proposing a new mechanism for the underlying pathology.

Collins' has also conducted research into diagnosis and management of placenta accreta spectrum (PAS). Her work with the International Society for Placenta Accreta Spectrum (IS-PAS) includes producing standardised definitions for ultrasound and MRI markers and the only evidence-based guideline for intra-partum management. She has also studied the negative psychological effects of PAS having demonstrated that nearly 50% of women affected by this experience symptoms of post-traumatic stress disorder (PTSD) related to their delivery.

== Awards and honors ==
- 1999 - Nuffield Prize for Medicine
- 1999 - Hobson Mann Clinical Medicine Scholarship
- 2000 - Patrick Mallam Memorial Prize for Clinical Medicine
- 2000 - Baber Studentship
- 2011 - Trophoblast Award 2011, International Federation of Placental Associations (IFPA)
- 2012 - Elected as Secretary to the European Working Party on Abnormally Invasive Placenta (EWP-AIP)
- 2012 - Elected ECR representative to the executive committee for the International Federation of Placental Associations (IFPA
- 2016 - Seelye Fellowship, University of Auckland
- 2018 - Andrée Gruslin Award 2018, International Federation of Placental Associations (IFPA)
- 2023 - Chair of the International Society for PAS (IS-PAS)

== Publications ==
=== Books ===
- The Oxford Handbook of Obstetrics and Gynaecology (2nd 3rd and 4th Editions)
- Obstetric Medicine (Oxford Specialist Handbooks in Obstetrics and Gynaecology) (2020)
- Series Editor of the Oxford Specialist Handbooks in Obstetrics and Gynaecology
  - Obstetric Medicine (Frise and Collins)
  - Urogynaecology (Jefferis and Price)

=== Selected articles ===
Placental Imaging and computational modelling:

- Yin, Y., Clark, A. R. and Collins, S. L. 3D Single Vessel Fractional Moving Blood Volume (3D-svFMBV): Fully Automated Tissue Perfusion Estimation Using Ultrasound. IEEE Trans Med Imaging 2024. Accession Number: 38478454 DOI: 10.1109/tmi.2024.3376668
- Looney, P., Stevenson, G.N., Nicolaides, K.H., Plasencia, W., Molloholli, M., Natsis, S. and Collins, S.L. Fully automated, real-time 3D-ultrasound segmentation to estimate first trimester placental volume using deep learning. JCI Insight. 2018;3(11): Doi 10.1172/jci.insight.120178.
- Welsh A.W., Fowlkes J.B., Pinter S.Z., Ives K.A., Owens G.E, Rubin J.M., Kripfgans O.D., Looney P., Collins S.L., Stevenson G.N. Three-dimensional US Fractional Moving Blood Volume: Validation of Renal Perfusion Quantification. Radiology. 2019;293(2):460-468.

Placenta Accreta Spectrum

- Jauniaux E., Ayres-De-Campos D., Langhoff- Roos J., Fox K., Collins S.L. FIGO classification for the clinical diagnosis of placenta accreta spectrum disorders. Int. JGO 2019;146(1):20-24.
- Tol I.D., Yousif M., Collins S.L. Post traumatic stress disorder (PTSD): The psychological sequelae of abnormally invasive placenta (AIP). Placenta 2019; 81:42-45.
- Collins S.L., Ashcroft A., Braun T., Calda P., Langhoff-Roos J., Morel O., Stefanovic V., Tutschek B., Chantraine F., On behalf of the European Working Group on Abnormally Invasive Placenta (EW-AIP). Proposal for standardised ultrasound descriptors of abnormally invasive placenta (AIP). Ultrasound in Obstetrics and Gynaecology 2016;47(3):271-5.

National and International guidelines

- Collins S.L. et al, Evidence-based guidelines for the management of abnormally-invasive placenta (AIP): recommendations from the International Society for AIP. AmJOG 2019;220(6):511-526.
- Jauniaux E., Alfirevic Z., Bhide A.G., Belfort M.A., Burton G.J., Collins S.L., Dornan S., Jurkovic D., Kayem G., Kingdom J., et al. Placenta Praevia and Placenta Accreta: Diagnosis and Management: Green-top Guideline No. 27a. BJOG 2019;126(1):e1-e48.
- Jauniaux E., Bhide A., Kennedy A., Woodward P., Hubinot C., Collins S.L. FIGO consensus guidelines on placenta accreta spectrum disorders: Prenatal diagnosis and screening. Int. JGO. 2018;140(3):274-80.

Pain

- Lee N., Gao Y., Collins S., Martensson L., Randall W., Rowe T-M., Kildea S. Caesarean delivery rates and analgesia effectiveness following injections of sterile water for back pain in labour: A multicenter, randomised placebo controlled trial. EClinicalMedicine. 2020; DOI: https://doi.org/10.1016/j.eclinm.2020.100447
- Derry S., Straube S., Moore R.A., Hancock H., Collins S.L. Intracutaneous or subcutaneous sterile water injection compared with blinded controls for pain management in labour. The Cochrane Library 2012, Issue 1.
- Collins S.L., Moore R.A., & McQuay H.J. The visual analogue pain intensity scale: what is moderate pain in millimetres? Pain 1997; 72: 95-97.
