= Jamie Owen =

British journalist

- Born: 1967 (age 58–59)
- Education: Christ College, Brecon; Cardiff University
- Occupations: Journalist, broadcaster, and writer
- Years active: 1989–present
- Website: http://www.jamieowen.co.uk/

Jamie Owen (born 1967) is a Welsh journalist, broadcaster, writer and former BBC Wales Today presenter. He joined the BBC in 1989, first working at BBC Radio and then presenting BBC Wales Today between 1994 and 2018. He has presented other TV and radio programmes and has published several books.

== Background ==
Owen was born in Haverfordwest, Pembrokeshire. His father, James Meyrick Owen, was a Pembroke Dock Solicitor, and his mother was a health visitor and midwife.

== Education ==
Owen was educated at Pennar School, Pembroke Dock; Christ College, Brecon; University of Gloucestershire and Cardiff University.

== Career ==
Owen joined the BBC in 1989 and worked at BBC Radio 3, later joining BBC Radio 4 as a newsreader and announcer. He then continued his career as a continuity announcer for BBC One & BBC Two Wales in the early 1990s. He had been a main presenter on BBC Wales' flagship news programme, BBC Wales Today since 1994, and has presented a weekday morning radio show on BBC Radio Wales, as well as a talk programme for BBC Radio Wales on Sundays at midday. He has also presented Songs of Praise, BBC Breakfast News and BBC Radio 4's Shipping Forecast and is currently working with BBC World Service Trust in the Middle East in Jordan, Ramallah, Libya and Egypt.

On 9 January 2018 it was announced by the BBC that Owen would be leaving BBC Wales, and that he would be taking on a new role at international broadcaster TRT World. He left TRT World and joined CGTN in 2019.

== Publications ==
- "Magic Islands" – a sailing journey around Welsh islands in a 100-year-old Bristol Channel Pilot Cutter (Gomer Press, 2002) ISBN 9781843231905
- "Magic Harbours" – a sailing voyage around the harbours of Wales (Pont Books, 2005) ISBN 9781843234647
- "Welsh Journeys" – charted travels around the Welsh landscape (Gomer Press, 2005) ISBN 9781843235699
- "More Welsh Journeys" (Gomer Press, 2006) ISBN 9781843237389
- "Around Wales by B-Roads and Byways" (Ebury Press, 2010) ISBN 9780091932824
- "A year in Pembrokeshire" - a collaboration with black-and-white photographer David Wilson, depicting through words and pictures the people and places of Pembrokeshire (Graffeg Limited, 2018) ISBN 978-1912213658

His first three books were filmed for the BBC and published on DVD.
