= BBC 2W =

Former digital-only television channel (2001–2009)

- Country: United Kingdom
- Broadcast area: Wales
- Network: BBC Two

Programming
- Picture format: 576i (16:9 SDTV)

Ownership
- Owner: BBC Cymru Wales
- Sister channels: BBC One Wales; BBC Two Wales

History
- Launched: 5 November 2001; 24 years ago
- Replaced: BBC Choice Wales
- Closed: 2 January 2009; 17 years ago

Availability (at time of closure)

Terrestrial
- Freeview: Channel 2 (Wales only)

BBC 2W was a digital television channel run by the BBC in Wales until January 2009. It replaced the standard BBC Two broadcast on digital services in Wales – running on weekdays from 8.30pm to 10pm. Launched on 5 November 2001, it had an initial reach of 1.1 million viewers.

== History ==
It served as a replacement for BBC Choice Wales, which had been shut down on 30 March 2001. 2W broadcast in English and was aimed at the English-speaking population, unlike S4C, which broadcasts primarily in Welsh. It was expected that the service would become a success, as 40% of Welsh households at the time of launching had access to digital television, a high figure compared to other parts of the UK.

The digital-only service was replaced with a single BBC Two for Wales on 2 January 2009. BBC 2W was designed to offer "a unique experience unavailable anywhere else with the watchwords of topicality and style, intelligence with an occasional touch of irreverence, shining through" for Welsh audiences.

The channel name on the Electronic Programme Guide was BBC 2W although outside its broadcast hours the channel was referred to onscreen as BBC Two Wales, using the BBC Two logo. The channel received complaints from some viewers because of its policy of broadcasting only Welsh-based programmes (including many repeats) during its opt-out hours; unlike BBC Two Wales which only opted out for live sport and new programming. The first switchoff of analogue television in the UK, for instance, was controversial because viewers in Llansteffan and Ferryside, whose analogue transmitter was due to be switched off, insisted that BBC Two Wales be left broadcasting in analogue.

The channel did provide a choice to all other viewers. Viewers on satellite could select a different BBC Two region (but not BBC Two Wales), and viewers on Freeview and cable could switch back to analogue to watch BBC Two Wales, although they were unable to watch the programme in widescreen. However, some programmes seen on network BBC Two were pre-empted, an example in its launch month being the miniseries Band of Brothers and BBC documentaries, which waere rescheduled to air on BBC One Wales at a later date, usually late at night.

Near Christmas 2001, BBC One Wales aired a 90-second musical promo on how to tune in to the service featuring BBC Wales personalities Rupert Moon, Jane Harvey and Derek Brockway.

Three months after launching, there were still no official viewing figures for the channel. The success of the channel was only measured by internal surveys at the BBC.

== Programming ==
The first night on air (5 November 2001) was a theme night dedicated to Welsh singer Tom Jones.

Originally, the channel's news programme was 2W News & Sport, launching with the channel. It initially ran at 9pm and its first presenters were Jason Mohammad and Frances Donovan. It had become popular by January 2002. In 2005, this was replaced by a bulletin of Wales Today, also shown on BBC One Wales. The bulletin, entitled Wales Today on 2W carried the same titles as that on BBC One Wales and was broadcast from the same studio with the same main presenters.

In January 2002, the channel's rugby programmes Scrum V and Scrum V Live added interactive television data services with information on the matches. More programmes seen on the channel would feature the same treatment throughout 2002.

== On-screen presentation ==
One of the channel's idents introduced in 2003, depicting the BBC 2W logo box as a garage door.

BBC 2W's original ident in 2001 was a bright green design with a stylised spinning cube that could transition directly into a programme menu. In 2003, a new set of idents debuted featuring a number of live action sequences where a green BBC 2W logo box is integrated into the scene as a physical object (such as on a beer tap or painted on a garage door), whilst still ending up in the bottom right-hand corner location like the usual BBC Two idents.

However from 18 February 2007, BBC 2W simply used the standard BBC Two idents with the 2W box. At crossover (when BBC Two Wales became BBC 2W) the boxes alternated between each other during the ident. This alternation also occurred during trailers which advertised programmes during BBC 2W hours.

== Closure ==
BBC 2W closed down on 2 January 2009 in the run-up to digital switchover as part of plans to achieve 3% annual efficiencies at BBC Wales. Digital BBC Two in Wales reverted to the network version, with less frequent regional programmes as was the arrangement on analogue BBC Two Wales.
