= BBC Radio Wales =

Welsh national radio station

Coordinates: 51°29′53″N 3°13′40″W

- Logo used since 2022
- Cardiff and Wrexham; Wales
- Frequencies: DAB: 12D MuxCo Mid & West Wales; 10D/12D MuxCo North Wales; 12D Now Digital SE Wales; 12A Bauer Swansea; 10D MuxCo Wrexham, Chester & Liverpool; FM: 90.2–92.3 MHz, 93.9–96.1 MHz and 103.9 MHz MW: 882 kHz, Freesat: 714 (UK-wide); Freeview: 711 (Wales only); Sky: 0115 (UK-wide); Virgin Media: 931 (UK-wide)
- RDS: BBCWALES

Programming
- Language: English
- Format: Freeform

Ownership
- Owner: BBC
- Operator: BBC Cymru Wales
- Sister stations: BBC Radio Cymru; BBC Radio Cymru 2

History
- First air date: 13 November 1978; 47 years ago
- Former frequencies: AM: 657 kHz (until 9 June 2021), 1125 kHz (until 2 April 2020)

Technical information
- Licensing authority: Ofcom

Links
- Website: BBC Radio Wales via BBC Sounds

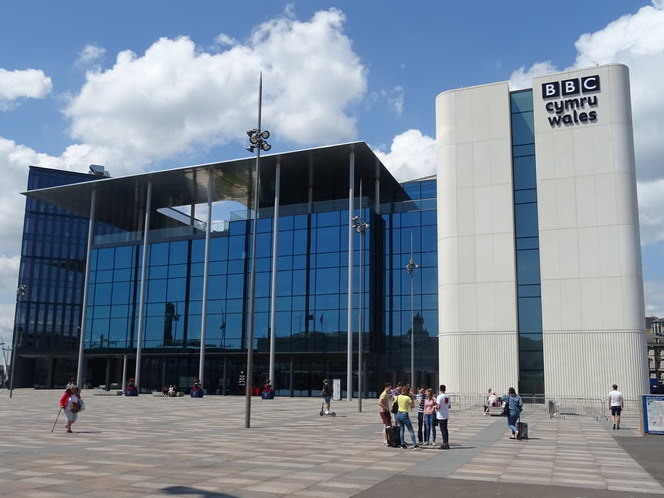
BBC Cymru Wales New Broadcasting House

BBC Radio Wales is a Welsh national radio station owned and operated by BBC Cymru Wales, a division of the BBC. It began broadcasting on 13 November 1978, replacing the Welsh opt-out service of BBC Radio 4.

As of August 2022, the station's managing editor is Carolyn Hitt, who is also editor of BBC Wales Sport.

Radio Wales is broadcast in English, whilst sister network Radio Cymru broadcasts in Welsh. According to RAJAR, BBC Radio Wales has a weekly audience of 306,000 listeners and a listening share of 3.9%, as of March 2024.

== History ==
In November 1978, BBC Radio Wales launched on the former Radio 4 opt-out frequency of 882 kHz. Initially the station broadcast for only twenty hours per week, and relayed output from Radio 2 and Radio 4 at other times. However, the groundwork had been laid for the station to gradually become a full-time service and now Radio Wales broadcasts for up to twenty hours a day.

BBC Radio Wales was preceded in the autumn of 1978 by four experimental local radio stations broadcasting for a single week: Radio Wrexham, Radio Deeside, Radio Merthyr and Radio Rhondda. They were broadcast using an RTÉ Outside Broadcast transmitter. The first editor of BBC Radio Wales was Teleri Bevan, a former producer for Radio 4 Wales.

Radio Wales commenced broadcasting at 6.30am on Monday 13 November 1978 with the first edition of AM, a breakfast magazine show presented by Anita Morgan, which replaced the news-driven predecessor Good Morning Wales. Chris Stuart later took over AM, presenting the programme for almost a decade, before it was replaced by a revival of Good Morning Wales, which was again axed in May 2019. The other main presenters for the first decade on air included Mike Flynn, who hosted a show each weekday until 1989, Vincent Kane, Noreen Bray and Alun Williams.

By 1985, Roy Noble was also a regular daily voice, presenting weekday magazine shows for the station for 27 years. Old Radio 4 type continuity studios were modified to become "self-operated" by the early 1980s. Outside broadcasts from different towns in Wales were also introduced, with Mike Flynn and Alun Williams hosting a weekly three-hour live show on Friday mornings.

Previous BBC Radio Wales logo used from 2019 to 2022

BBC Radio Wales also began to use publicity similar to the type used by commercial radio stations in the UK. Other early presenters included Wyn Calvin, Maureen Staffer, Sylvia Horn, G. V. Wynne Jones (Geevers), Claire Vincent, Piet Brinton, Jackie Emlyn and Princess Anne's biographer Brian Hoey.

=== Radio Gwent and Radio Clwyd opt-outs ===
Following BBC Wales' experiments with community radio in 1978, two permanent opt-out services were developed in the north-east and the south-east. Radio Deeside was relaunched in February 1980 in response to the closure of the Shotton steelworks.

Its coverage area was expanded to the rest of Clwyd in October 1981 and the station was subsequently renamed BBC Radio Clwyd, broadcasting on 657 kHz, and featuring extended local news bulletins, a mid-morning show and occasional special programming from studios in Mold until its closure in October 1993. After the closure of Radio Clwyd, local bulletins for north-east Wales continued until March 2002 - staff having moved from Mold to Wrexham in June 1998.

BBC Radio Gwent, based in Cwmbran, broadcast from 18 April 1983 until March 1991. Radio Gwent was available on FM, and since its closure has continued to relay the national Radio Wales service on the same FM frequencies to the Gwent area. Both of these stations operated at peak times only and carried Radio Wales at other times.

== Programming ==
BBC Radio Wales broadcasts from 06.00 to 01.00 (07:00 to 01:00 on Saturday), live from the headquarters of BBC Cymru Wales at Central Square, near the main railway station in Cardiff city centre. During the station's downtime, Radio Wales simulcasts the output of BBC Radio 5 Live.

Weekday programming includes the flagship breakfast news magazine Radio Wales Breakfast, magazine shows with Bronwen Lewis (Monday - Thursday), Jason Mohammad (Monday–Wednesday), Behnaz Akhgar (Monday–Thursday) and Eleri Siôn.

Weekend programming includes Sunday afternoon shows with Lynn Bowles and Roy Noble, Adam Walton's new music show on Saturday nights, Celtic Heartbeat with Frank Hennessy, Beverley’s World of Music with Beverley Humphreys and entertainment shows with Lucy Owen and Owen Money.

Most of Radio Wales' programming is produced and broadcast from the Cardiff headquarters with the Adam Walton show originating from the BBC's Wrexham studios on the Glyndŵr University campus.

=== Sports coverage ===
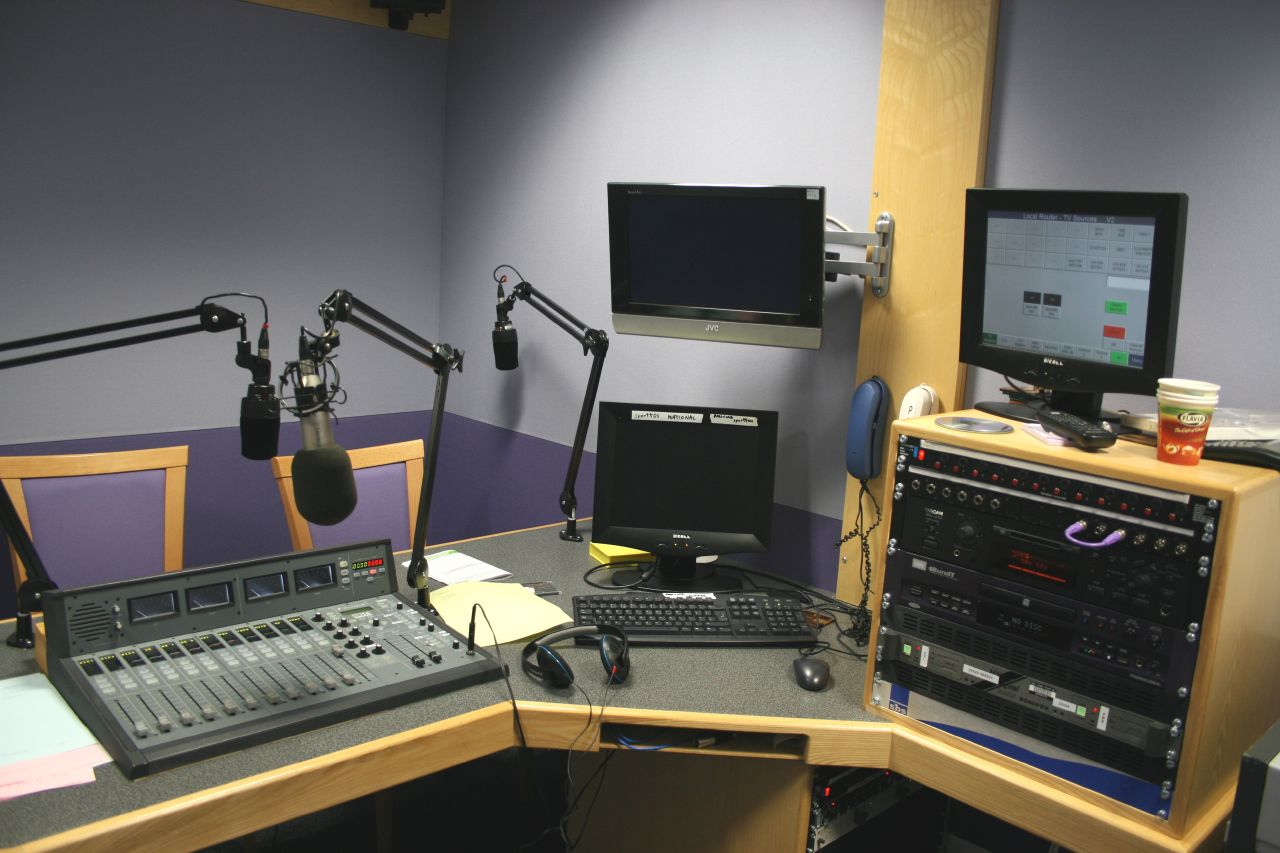
A BBC Wales Sport radio booth

Radio Wales Sport is broadcast on Saturdays, generally between 14:00 and 19:00, during the football and rugby seasons (the programme is extended on occasions to include live commentary of early and late matches).

Radio Wales Sport features localised FM commentary of Swansea City in the south-west of Wales, Cardiff City in the south-east of Wales, and Wrexham in north Wales with a rolling service of match updates and results on medium wave.

== Presenters ==
Notable current presenters include:

- Behnaz Akhgar (Monday - Thursday afternoons)
- Lynn Bowles (Sunday afternoons)
- Wyre Davies (Wednesday drivetime)
- Bethan Elfyn (Saturday evenings)
- Elin Fflur (Friday evenings)
- Oliver Hides (The Phone In - Thursday - Friday afternoons)
- Beverley Humphries (Sunday nights)
- Bronwen Lewis (Monday to,Thursday mid mornings)
- Jason Mohammad (The Phone In - Monday - Wednesday afternoons)
- Owen Money (Money for Nothing, Solid Gold Sunday)
- Roy Noble (Sunday evenings)
- Lucy Owen (Saturday afternoons)
- Molly Palmer (Tuesday evenings)
- Kiri Pritchard-McLean (Thursday evenings; Kiri's Comedy Club)
- Aleighcia Scott (Thursday evenings)
- Eleri Siôn (Monday - Thursday nights, Friday afternoon)
- Huw Stephens (Monday evenings)
- Claire Summers (Monday - Tuesday; Thursday - Friday drivetime)
- Ian "H" Watkins (Friday nights)
- Adam Walton (Saturday nights, Science Cafe)

Past presenters include:

- Janice Long (died in 2021)
- Chris Needs (died in 2020)
- Alan Thompson (died in 2017)
- Vicki Blight
- Wynne Evans
- Aled Jones
- Jamie Owen
- Carol Vorderman

== Transmission ==
BBC Radio Wales is broadcast across Wales on FM, DAB and 882 kHz medium wave. It is also available on Freeview in Wales and throughout the UK on Freesat, Sky, Virgin Media and the BBC Sounds service.

As Radio Wales was created from an opt-out of BBC Radio 4, it inherited the medium wave transmitters previously used by Radio 4 across Wales — the main service coming from the Washford transmitter in Somerset on 882 kHz. This transmitter was originally built to cover southern Wales and most of the West Country, and has a far greater coverage than its intended transmission area. It can be heard across the Bristol area, in much of Devon and northern Cornwall, as well as in eastern and south-eastern counties of Ireland.

Initially, Radio Wales was not broadcast on FM as Radio 4's former FM transmitters in Wales were used for BBC Radio Cymru. In 1983, Radio Wales gained some FM coverage with the creation of opt-out service, BBC Radio Gwent. After the breakfast programme, Radio Gwent simulcast most of Radio Wales' output. When the station closed in 1991, the FM frequencies were retained to broadcast Radio Wales.

From 1999 onwards, the BBC was able to start creating an FM network for Radio Wales, including a 120 kW ERP transmitter near Aberystwyth. On 6 December 2011, Radio Wales added the 40 kW ERP Wenvoe transmitter to its network on 103.9 MHz FM, replacing a low-power FM transmitter on the Wenallt Hill. This FM output covers South Wales and the West of England, including the city of Bristol.

On 24 October 2018, the station increased its FM coverage in North East and Mid Wales by taking over 32 transmitters previously used by BBC Radio 3. The changeover allowed an estimated 400,000 listeners to receive Radio Wales on FM, extending its reach to a potential 91% of households in Wales.

Regional opt-outs have been established for sports coverage on FM; specifically live football commentaries involving Cardiff City in the south-east, Swansea City in the south-west and Wrexham in the north.

BBC Radio Wales's medium wave broadcasts on 1125 kHz from Llandrindon Wells and on 882 kHz from Tywyn and Forden were discontinued on 2 April 2020, with 657 kHz in Wrexham and 882 kHz in Penmon following suit on 9 June 2021. The Washford transmitter on 882 kHz is the sole remaining BBC Radio Wales medium wave transmitter.

== Race discrimination case ==
In 2001, presenter Lionel Kelleway won a case for racial discrimination against BBC Radio Wales, when they dropped his Landmark series, which won Sony Awards in 1991 and 1992, after around ten years, because of his English accent.
