= William Roberts (footballer, born 1863) =

Welsh footballer

Personal information
- Full name: William Roberts
- Date of birth: 1863
- Place of birth: Rhyl, Wales
- Date of death: Not known
- Position: Forward

Senior career*
| Years | Team | Apps | (Gls) |
| 1880–1885 | Rhyl | | |
| 1885–1891 | Manchester Welsh | | |

International career
| 1883 | Wales | 1 | (0) |
- * Club domestic league appearances and goals

William Roberts (born 1863) was a Welsh footballer who played as a forward in the 1880s and made one appearance for Wales.

== Football career ==
Roberts was born in Rhyl in north-east Wales and started his football career at his local club. At Rhyl, he was a "good dribbler and very tricky" who "combined well with his colleagues". He was an opportunistic player who excelled at "individual runs". As team captain, he helped Rhyl reach the final of the Northern Welsh F.A. in 1883.

His solitary international appearance came at the Kennington Oval against England on 3 February 1883 when he was a late replacement for Thomas Britten, thus becoming the first international player from Rhyl. His international appearance was not a success as the match finished 5–0 in favour of the home country with three goals from Clement Mitchell. Roberts' performance was criticised for his lack of experience: "He may play fairly well for his own club but cannot be said to have been a success against England".

== Later career ==
A butcher by trade, Roberts moved to Manchester in 1885, where he turned out for the local Welsh expatriate side.
