= Thomas Aubrey =

Thomas Aubrey may refer to:

- Thomas Aubrey (Methodist minister) (1808–1867), Welsh Wesleyan Methodist minister
- Sir Thomas Aubrey, 5th Baronet (died 1786) of the Aubrey baronets
- Sir Thomas Digby Aubrey, 7th Baronet (1782–1856) of the Aubrey baronets, High Sheriff of Buckinghamshire
