= Emma Walford =

Welsh actress, singer and broadcaster

Emma Walford (born 7 February 1974) is a Welsh actress, singer and broadcaster. She is best known as a member of the girl group 'Eden' and as a presenter for the S4C reality show Priodas Pum Mil.

== Career ==
=== Eden ===
Walford first came to prominence in 1996, when she joined Non Parry and Rachael Solomon as part of the Welsh-language pop group Eden.

Initially appearing as backing singers for singer Caryl Parry Jones, they were signed by the influential record label Sain and released their debut album Paid a Bod Ofn (Don't Be Afraid) in 1997.

They quickly established themselves as one of the most popular Welsh pop groups, appearing on their own prime time TV special for S4C and from 1998, in the children's sitcom Hotel Eddie, with Walford cast as the antagonist Emma Worthington, the hotel's manager.

Eden released their second album, Yn Ôl i Eden (Back to Eden), in 1999, followed by sporadic single releases including Cer Nawr in 2003, Rhywbeth yn y Sêr in 2017 (re-released in 2022) and 'Sa Neb Fel Ti in 2021.

In 2003, Walford co-composed Oes Lle I Mi? alongside her sister-in-law, poet Mererid Hopwood, which went onto win the annual Cân i Gymru (Song for Wales) contest, performed by Eden bandmate Non Parry and Steffan Rhys Williams.

Since the mid-2010s, Eden has enjoyed a renewed popularity, appearing as headliners at gigs at the National Eisteddfod and the Urdd National Eisteddfod. They continue to perform regularly as well as making regular Welsh TV and radio appearances, including one-off S4C specials in 2013 and 2018, alongside Elin Fflur.

=== Broadcasting ===
Following her success at Cân i Gymru, Walford became a judge on the first series of the S4C reality music competition Wawffactor in 2003.

Walford began to move into presenting roles, starting in 2004 by reviving her Emma Worthington character for the S4C children's quiz show Crafwr. In the same year, she also appeared in the ITV Wales sketch show Jeff Global's Global Probe, starring John Sparkes.

In 2008, she co-hosted the third series of the cookery competition Casa Dudley, which was succeeded the following year by a long-running celebrity version, Pryd o Ser.

In 2009, she joined the presenting team of Wedi 3 (After 3), S4C's weekday afternoon magazine show, before moving onto its sister show Heno (Tonight) three years later.

Walford also returned to acting in 2014, appearing in three series of the S4C children's sitcom Ysbyty Hospital.

In November 2016, she began presenting Priodas Pum Mil (Five Thousand Pound Wedding) alongside Trystan Ellis-Morris. The show's success led to the launch of a community-based spin-off series, Prosiect Pum Mil (Five Thousand Pound Project) three years later.

Walford and Ellis-Morris shared the BAFTA Cymru award for Best Presenter in 2020 and were nominated in the same category three years later.

In November 2020, following stints as cover presenters, Walford and Ellis-Morris began presenting a weekly Friday morning show on BBC Radio Cymru.

== Personal life ==
Walford was born in Abergele and attended Ysgol y Creuddyn in Penrhyn Bay. At the age of fifteen, she appeared in a lead role in a musical production during the 1989 National Eisteddfod in Llanrwst, which led to her TV performing debut on Noson Lawen.

She now lives in Cowbridge with her husband Huw Eurig Davies, a Welsh television executive, and two children.
