= SC2 (leisure complex) =

Waterpark and activity centre in Rhyl, Wales

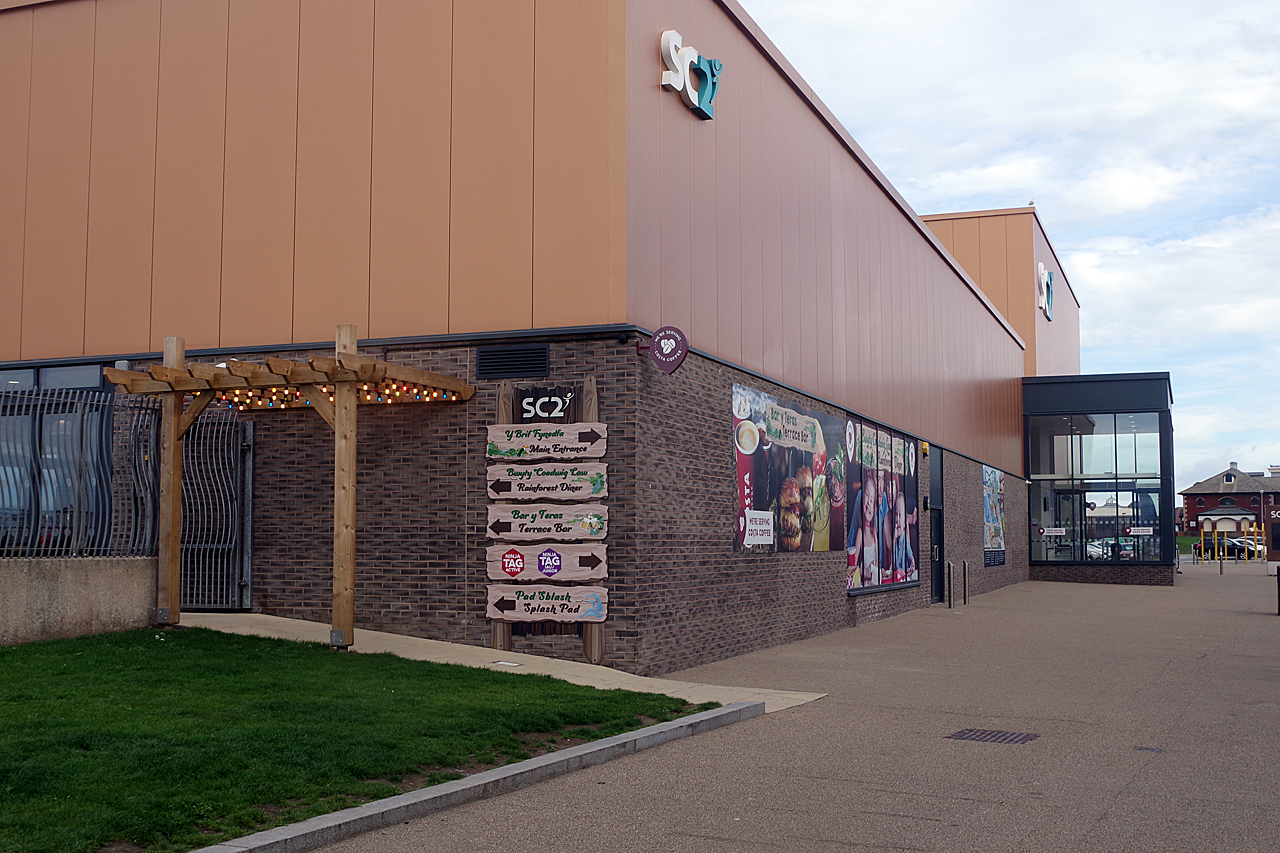
- Interactive map of SC2
- Location: Rhyl, Wales, UK
- Coordinates: 53°19′14.8″N 3°29′47″W
- Opened: 2019
- Pools: 2 pools
- Water slides: 6 water slides
- Website: https://sc2rhyl.co.uk/

SC2 (Sun Centre 2) is a leisure complex in Rhyl, United Kingdom.

== History ==
The original Sun Centre waterpark closed in February 2014. Denbighshire council had withdrawn funding from the company which operated it and as a result the not-for-profit firm could no longer afford to keep it open. In May 2016, the council submitted plans to demolish the waterpark and build a replacement facility.

The facility was opened in 2019, five years after the closure of Rhyl Sun Centre.

== Facilities ==
The complex has an indoor and outdoor waterpark with water slides and play areas for young children. Separate from the waterpark, there is also a "Ninja Tag" attraction.
