= Ibiza, Ibiza =

1986 television film

Ibiza, Ibiza is a 1986 Welsh comedy television film which aired on Welsh-language channel S4C. It was directed by Ronw Protheroe and stars Caryl Parry Jones, Siw Hughes, Emyr Wyn, and Huw Chiswell. It covers the stories of three women as they go on holiday to the island of Ibiza.

== Cast ==
- Caryl Parry Jones
- Siw Hughes
- Emyr Wyn
- Islwyn Morris
- Huw Chiswell
- Gaynor Davies
