= Don't Tell the Bride (Australian TV series) =

- Genre: Reality
- Presented by: Kate Ritchie
- Narrated by: Kate Ritchie
- Theme music composer: Michael Lira
- Country of origin: Australia
- Original language: English
- No. of seasons: 1
- No. of episodes: 6

Production
- Running time: 30 minutes
- Production company: Southern Star Group

Original release
- Network: Network Ten
- Release: 21 August – 24 September 2012

Don't Tell the Bride is an Australian reality television series premiered on Network Ten on Tuesday 21 August 2012. Presented and narrated by Kate Ritchie, this series was an adaptation of the UK series Don't Tell the Bride that screened on BBC Three.

The show's format involves an engaged couple who are given $25,000 to spend on their wedding. They must spend three weeks apart without contact as the groom organises every aspect of the event and attire including the wedding dress and hen and stag parties, surprising the bride.

== Episodes ==
- Episode 1: Melissa and Aaron's Wedding
- Episode 2: Tarin and Jason's Wedding
- Episode 3: Stef and Jake's Wedding
- Episode 4: Anastasia and Matt's Wedding
- Episode 5: Shannon and Jay's Wedding
- Episode 6: Jessica and Adam's Wedding
