= Rhyl Town Hall =

Municipal building in Rhyl, Wales

- Neuadd y Dref Rhyl (Welsh)
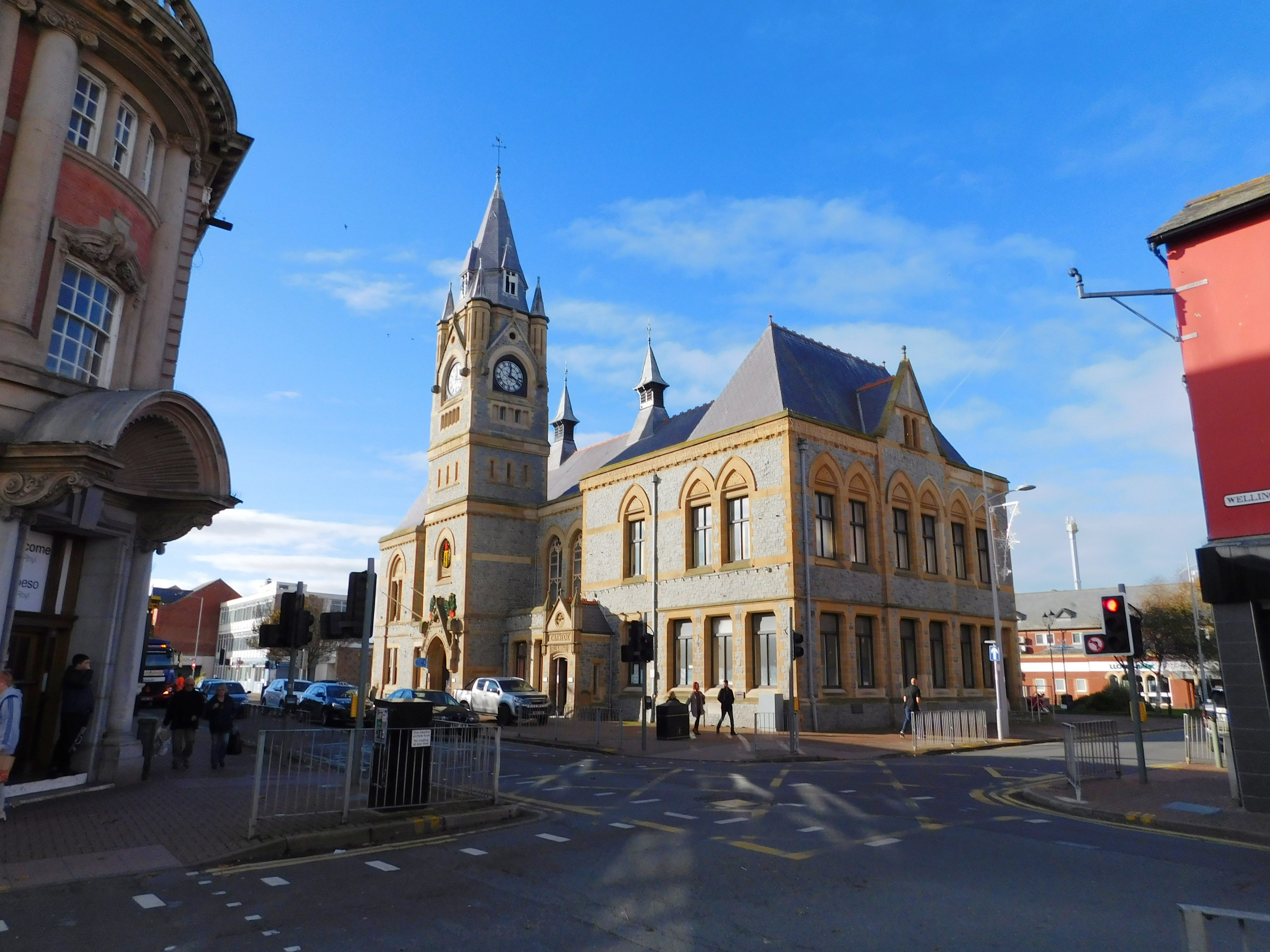
- Rhyl Town Hall

- Shown in Denbighshire
- 53.3198°N 3.4915°W
- Location: Wellington Road, Rhyl

History
- Built: 1876

Site notes
- Architect(s): Wood and Turner
- Architectural style: Gothic style

Listed Building – Grade II
- Official name: Town Hall
- Designated: 2 February 1981
- Reference no.: 1498

Rhyl Town Hall (Welsh: Neuadd y Dref Rhyl) is a municipal structure in Wellington Road in Rhyl, Denbighshire, Wales. The town hall, which was the headquarters of Rhyl Urban District Council, is a Grade II listed building.

== History ==
The first municipal offices in Rhyl were established in the High Street in 1849. After they were appointed in 1852, the new improvement commissioners decided to procure more substantial offices on a site on the northwest side of Wellington Road: the new offices were designed by Thomas Mainwaring Penson and was completed in 1856. After this facility also proved inadequate, the commissioners decided to demolish the existing structure and to construct a new building on the same site.

The foundation stone for the new building was laid by the Lord Lieutenant of Flintshire, Hugh Robert Hughes, on 15 December 1873. It was designed by Wood and Turner of Barrow-in-Furness in the Gothic style, built in Penmaenmawr stone by a local contractor, J. Rhydwen Jones, at a cost of £6,000, and officially opened by Hughes, when he returned on 11 October 1876. The original design involved an asymmetrical main frontage of eight bays facing onto Wellington Road with the left hand bay topped with a mansard roof to form a pavilion; the central bay, which was projected forward, featured a gabled porch on the ground floor, a plain panel and a blind traceried window on the first floor and, above that, a tall clock tower with corner turrets, a spire and a weather vane. The bays to the left and the right of the central bay, which were recessed on the first floor, contained casement windows on the ground floor and traceried windows on the first floor, while the left hand bay contained mullioned windows on both floors. Internally, the principal room was the main hall.

After significant population growth, largely associated with the seaside tourism industry, the area was advanced to the status of urban district with the town hall as its headquarters in 1895. In 1897, the filmmaker, Arthur Cheetham, took a lease on the main hall and started giving monthly performances of his own films; this arrangement continued until 1900 when he stopped all performances at the town hall in anticipation of the opening his first all-year-round cinema in Rhyl in 1906. The Afro-American educator and activist, Hallie Quinn Brown, gave a talk in the town hall in January 1898. The building was extended by five extra bays to the right in a similar style to incorporate a new Carnegie library in 1906; the extension was topped with a mansard roof to form a pavilion thereby creating symmetry with the pavilion on the left.

The building served as the headquarters of Rhyl Urban District Council for much of the 20th century but ceased to be local seat of government when the enlarged Rhuddlan Borough Council was formed in 1974. The miniature steam locomotive, Billie, which had been manufactured by Albert Barnes & Co for the Rhyl Miniature Railway in 1922, was acquired by Rhyl Town Council in 1978 and displayed in the town hall until it was relocated to the Albert Barnes Room at the miniature railway's central station in 2007. The town hall continued to serve as an events venue and became an approved location for marriages and civil partnership ceremonies; the register office for North Denbighshire relocated to the town hall in May 2018.
