= Rhyl F.C. =

Former association football club in Wales

Rhyl
- Full name: Rhyl Football Club
- Nickname: The Lilywhites
- Founded: 25 September 1878; 147 years ago
- Dissolved: 5 October 2021; 4 years ago
- Ground: Belle Vue
- Capacity: 3,000 (1,720 seated)
| Home colours | Away colours |

Rhyl Football Club (Welsh: Clwb Pêl Droed Y Rhyl) was a Welsh football club based in Rhyl, a seaside resort town located in Denbighshire. It withdrew from footballing activities in April 2020 and had its entire footballing record for the 2019–20 season expunged. It was formally dissolved 18 months later in October 2021.

During this period of inactivity a phoenix club now known as C.P.D. Y Rhyl 1879 was incorporated at Companies House by three of the sitting Rhyl FC directors of the time, including the chairman and managing director, on 6 May 2020. The team currently play in the Cymru North.

Football Association of Wales regulations do not allow clubs to liquidate and retain league status so the new Rhyl Football Club Limited Company had to re–brand as Clwb Pel–droed y Rhyl 1879 and restart life at the lowest rung in recreational football.

The founding date of 1879 used in the club name is inaccurate. The origins of the club can be dated much earlier and co–incide with the advent of the railway in the town.

Despite the club badge stating 1879, primary sources show the club was actually founded on 25 September 1878 during a meeting at Rhyl Town Hall. The team played its home matches at Belle Vue stadium, which can accommodate 3,000 spectators.

== History ==
Rhyl Football Club was originally formed on 25 September 1878, following a meeting held at Rhyl Town Hall. At a follow-up meeting a week later, it was decided that the club would play at a field adjacent to the Winter Gardens, and that the club colours would be all black with a white skull and crossbones on the chest. The first club captain was W. C. Langley. The club played in the 1878 Welsh Cup, but lost 1–0 in the First Round against Friars School, Bangor. There were several clubs in Rhyl at the time, one of these being Rhyl Grosvenor FC, who played a floodlit match against Rhyl FC in February 1879. Rhyl Grosvenor amalgamated with Rhyl FC in September 1879, prior to the start of the 1879–80 season.

Rhyl FC became founder members of the Welsh League, formed in 1890, but withdrew the following year. By that point, the club colours were red and black. They reformed as Rhyl Athletic in November 1892 and became founder members of the North Wales Coast League, winning the title in 1894–95, by which time the club was also being referred to as Rhyl or Rhyl Town. Rhyl Amateur joined forces with Rhyl Town in May 1898 and added the Anglo-Welsh competition known as The Combination to the club's fixtures. Despite financial crises, they remained in membership until the league disbanded at the end of the 1910–11 season. Under the name of Rhyl United, they rejoined the North Wales Coast League, but following the First World War, they moved to the North Wales Alliance, before becoming founder members of the Welsh National League (North) in 1921. Rhyl won the title in 1925–26 and became a limited company in 1928 as Rhyl Athletic. In 1929, Rhyl applied to join the Football League but York City became the only non-league team elected to the Third Division North. With North Wales football in turmoil in the early 1930s, Rhyl sought to realise their ambitions elsewhere. Another unsuccessful application to the Football League was made in 1932 before joining the Birmingham and District League. Seeking relief from the onerous travelling to the Birmingham area, Rhyl Athletic successfully applied to join the Cheshire County League in 1936, at the same time as changing their name back to Rhyl, and began one of the most successful chapters in the club's history.

In a post-war purple patch, Rhyl won the league title twice – in 1947–48 and 1950–51 – and the Welsh Cup twice in succession. In 1952, they beat Merthyr Tydfil 4–3 and became the first non-league side in the modern era to retain the trophy, by defeating Chester City 2–1 the following season. Rhyl had been losing finalists to Cardiff City in 1930 and Crewe Alexandra in 1937, but did not feature in the final again until 1993, when they lost 5–0 to Cardiff City. Between 1948 and 1972 Rhyl appeared regularly in the first round proper of the FA Cup. In 1957 Rhyl reached the fourth round proper, beating Notts County 3–1 away before losing 3–0 away to Bristol City; in 1971 they eliminated Hartlepool United and Barnsley before elimination by compatriots Swansea City.

In the Cheshire County League, success eluded them for several years before they won the title in 1972. On the dissolution of the Cheshire County League in 1982, Rhyl became members of the North West Counties League, winning promotion to the Northern Premier League in their first season. In 1992, they reluctantly decided to join the League of Wales, but because their application was received too late, they were placed instead in the Cymru Alliance, the second level of the pyramid system. In 1993–94, they won the title by six points and gained promotion to the League of Wales.

Over the years, the club have produced players of the highest calibre more than once, including Graham Williams (West Bromwich Albion), Barry Horne (Everton), Andy Jones (Charlton Athletic), Andy Holden (Oldham Athletic) and most recently Lee Trundle (Bristol City) after seeing his career revitalised in his short spell with Rhyl in 2000–01. For many years the club struggled in the top flight of Welsh football, but after being taken over by a consortium led by former player Peter Parry, a significant improvement in results saw Rhyl become one of the Welsh Premier League's leading clubs.

In season 2003–04, the club won the Welsh Premier League, qualifying for the Champions League qualification rounds (though they lost 7–1 on aggregate, to Skonto Riga of Latvia in the first qualifying round), and were winners of the League Cup and Welsh Cup, although they lost the final of the FAW Premier Cup 4–1 to Wrexham. Rhyl completed a famous quadruple by rounding off the season with a 6–0 win against Halkyn United in the Final of the North Wales Coast Challenge Cup. However, these feats were later tainted by the revelation that leading scorer Andy Moran had been taking the banned stimulant Nandrolone throughout the season. Rhyl won many games with late goals, leading to widespread rumours that other players were also taking the drug. Moran was stripped of his Golden Boot as a result, although the results were allowed to stand.

Rhyl could not reproduce their quadruple heroics in 2004–05. The club finished runners-up in the Welsh Premier League to TNS and also fell to the same team in both the Welsh Cup semi-final and Welsh Premier Cup quarter-final. A defeat to Carmarthen Town in the Final of the Welsh League Cup compounded a trophyless season for The Whites, although European qualification was gained by their runner-up finish in the Welsh Premier League.

In 2005–06, Rhyl recorded their first-ever win in European competition when they defeated Lithuanian side FK Atlantas 2–1 in the home leg of the first qualifying round of the UEFA Cup. Rhyl lost the away leg 3–2, but progressed on the away goals rule, the first Welsh team to make the second qualifying round since Barry Town in 1996–97. They lost in the second round against Norwegian club Viking F.K., 3–1 on aggregate.

The Lilywhites claimed more silverware in the 2005–06 domestic season when they lifted the Welsh Cup, beating Bangor City 2–0 at the Racecourse Ground, and the North Wales Challenge Cup after a 2–1 win over Denbigh Town in the Final. A third-placed finish in the Welsh Premier League meant Rhyl would compete for a third year in a row in European Club competitions.

Rhyl's 2006–07 European adventure in the UEFA Cup was ended at the first round with a 2–1 aggregate defeat by Lithuanian side FK Sūduva of Marijampole.

Back in the UEFA Cup in 2007–08, Rhyl achieved a memorable 3–1 home win over FC Haka only to be eliminated on away goals after a 2–0 defeat in the second leg in Finland.

The club participated in the 2008 Intertoto Cup but were defeated in the first round 9–3 on aggregate by Bohemians of Ireland.

In 2009 Rhyl won the Welsh Premier League for the second time comfortably finishing ahead of nearest challengers Llanelli, beating many club records including most wins in a season and most successive league wins. Rhyl took part in the Champions League starting in the second qualifying round against Partizan of Serbia. However, their efforts proved futile as Rhyl fell to Partizan with an aggregate score of 12–0, including an 8–0 rout at the Stadion Partizana.

On 30 July 2009 Rhyl made an announcement that Allan Bickerstaff had left the club and defender Greg Strong was to become player/manager.

On 17 May 2010, it was announced that Rhyl's Welsh Premier licence had been revoked. Their appeal was unsuccessful and they were relegated to the Cymru Alliance. The club finished Cymru Alliance runners-up to Gap Connah's Quay in 2010–11 and 2011–12. GAP secured promotion to the Welsh Premier League in 2012, having failed to obtain a domestic licence in 2011, leaving Rhyl as potential favourites for the title in 2012–13. From the terraces, Mike Jones was announced as the club's new general manager.

Rhyl started the 2012–13 season magnificently, winning their first 8 games. On 6 May 2013, having won the league title on 20 April, Rhyl beat Cefn Druids 2–0, thereby becoming the first club to complete a Cymru Alliance season without a defeat. In winning 24 matches and drawing 6, Rhyl scored 100 goals and secured promotion back to the Welsh Premier League after an absence of three years.

On 20 August 2013, Rhyl announced a three-year sponsorship deal with Corbett Sports that would see the Belle Vue ground renamed as the Corbett Sports Stadium.

In May 2015, it was announced that manager Greg Strong had left the club by "mutual consent". Former player Gareth Owen was then appointed as manager, with Mark Roberts as his assistant, but a disastrous run of form during which the club won only three matches in all competitions meant Owen and Roberts departed in February 2016. They were replaced by 24-year-old academy director Niall McGuinness, whose father Laurie, a former Rhyl coach, was appointed as assistant manager.

On 21 April 2020, the club announced it was going to cease trading and be formally wound up after failing to find a £175,000 investment that would have saved the club. The club's directors cited the financial impact of the COVID-19 pandemic as a reason for its demise, with no income to the club following the postponement of all football nationally. The former club's league position under manager Eddie Maurice Jones at the time was at its lowest for the past 30 years.

In May 2020 two members of staff, together with members of the Rhyl Fan Association (RFA), formed a phoenix club with the aim of continuing the historical legacy and tradition of the old club. Working in liaison with the RFA, a ballot was held to decide a name for the new entity, which resulted in CPD Y Rhyl 1879 being formally chosen. A few days later, the new club directors secured the use of the old club's Belle Vue ground for the 2020–21 season, with an exclusive option to buy the ground in its entirety for the new club.

== Rivalries ==
Rhyl shared a fierce rivalry with north Wales coast neighbours Bangor City. Games between the two clubs often drew crowds of over 1,000 and a few have managed to reach over 1,500 spectators, a great rarity in the Welsh Premier League. The police presence was often quite large when the two sides met as away fans travelled in their hundreds. On rare occasions, fighting broke out between the rival fans. In more recent years Rhyl also shared an initially friendlier, but increasingly hot tempered, derby match with close local neighbours Prestatyn Town, mainly due to the two towns being only 3 miles (5 km) apart.

== First team honours ==
=== League ===
- Welsh Premier League:
  - Winners (2): 2003–04, 2008–09
  - Runners-up (2): 2004–05, 2006–07
- Cymru Alliance:
  - Winners(2): 1993–94, 2012–13
  - Runners-up (2): 2010–11, 2011–12
- Cheshire County League:
  - Winners (3): 1947–48, 1950–51, 1971–72
  - Runners-up (4): 1948–49, 1949–50, 1951–52, 1955–56
- Cheshire County League Division Two:
  - Runners-up (1): 1981–82
- North West Counties League:
  - Runners-up (1): 1982–83
- Border Counties Floodlit League:
  - Runners-up (1): 1972–73

=== Cup ===
- Welsh Cup:
  - Winners (4): 1951–52, 1952–53, 2003–04, 2005–06
  - Runners-up (4): 1926–27, 1929–30, 1936–37, 1992–93
- Welsh League Cup:
  - Winners (2): 2002–03, 2003–04
  - Runners-up (4): 2004–05, 2006–07, 2007–08, 2009–10
- FAW Premier Cup:
  - Runners-up (1): 2003–04
- Cymru Alliance Cup:
  - Winners (2): 1992–93, 2011–12
  - Runners-up (1): 1993–94
- NWCFA Challenge Cup:
  - Winners (14): 1927–28, 1929–30, 1933–34, 1934–35, 1938–39, 1947–48, 1949–50, 1950–51, 1951–52, 1953–54, 1954–55, 1969–70, 2003–04, 2005–06
- Welsh Amateur Cup:
  - Winners (1): 1972–73
- Cheshire League Challenge Cup:
  - Winners (3): 1948–49, 1951–52, 1970–71
  - Runners-up (2): 1955–56, 1957–58
- Northern Premier League President's Cup:
  - Winners (1): 1984–85

== European results ==
| Season | Competition | Round | Opponent | Home | Away | Aggregate |
|---|---|---|---|---|---|---|
| 2004–05 | UEFA Champions League | 1Q | (Latvia) Skonto FC | 1–3 | 0–4 | 1–7 |
| 2005–06 | UEFA Cup | 1Q | (Lithuania) Atlantas | 2–1 | 2–3 | 4–4 (a) |
| 2005–06 | UEFA Cup | 2Q | (Norway) Viking | 0–1 | 1–2 | 1–3 |
| 2006–07 | UEFA Cup | 1Q | (Lithuania) Sūduva | 0–0 | 1–2 | 1–2 |
| 2007–08 | UEFA Cup | 1Q | (Finland) Haka | 3–1 | 0–2 | 3–3 (a) |
| 2008 | UEFA Intertoto Cup | 1R | (Republic of Ireland) Bohemians | 2–4 | 1–5 | 3–9 |
| 2009–10 | UEFA Champions League | 2Q | (Serbia) Partizan | 0–4 | 0–8 | 0–12 |

Notes

- 1R: First round
- 1Q: First qualifying round
- 2Q: Second qualifying round

== Records ==
- Biggest Welsh Premier win: 7–0 v Llanelli, 2000
- Biggest Welsh Premier away win: 7–1 v Cwmbran Town, 2006
- Biggest Welsh Premier defeat: 0–10 at The New Saints, 28 August 2016
- Best FA Cup performance: Third round (1970–71)
- Best FA Trophy performance: Second round (1987–88)

== Managers ==
- (England) Frank Barson (1932–1935)
- (Scotland) John Dougary (1951–1954)
- (Wales) Ernie Jones (1954–1956)
- (Wales) T. G. Jones (1968)
- (England) Ray Jones (1981–1986)
- (England) John Hulse (2002–2008)
- (Wales) Allan Bickerstaff (2008–2009)
- (England) Greg Strong (2009–2015)
- (Wales) Gareth Owen (2015–2016)
- (Wales) Niall McGuinness (2016–2017)
- (England) Mark Connolly (2017–2018)
- (Wales) Matthew Jones (2018)
- (England) Gareth Wilson (2018)
- (Wales) Eddie Maurice Jones (2018–2020)
