= Albert Barnes & Co =

Manufacturer of miniature steam locomotives

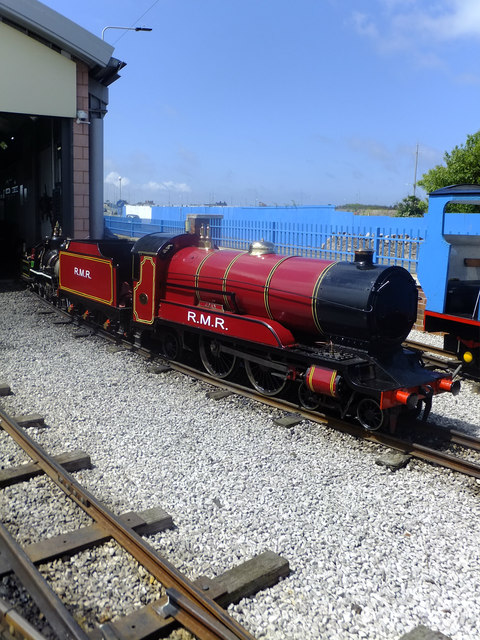
Joan, a miniature railway locomotive near to Rhyl, Denbighshire, Great Britain. Joan, number 101 a 4-4-2 locomotive built by Albert Barnes & Co, entered service in August 1920. Designed by Henry Greenly this was the first of 6 locomotives of this type built. She has had an interesting career including a spell at the now closed Belle Vue zoo

Albert Barnes & Co were Rhyl based manufacturers of miniature steam locomotives. A number of them are preserved at the Rhyl Miniature Railway. Albert Barnes was the owner of Rhyl Amusements Ltd. Six 4-4-2 locomotives were built.

== Locomotive list ==
Number	Name	Date built	Notes	Picture
101	Joan	1920		
102	Railway Queen	c.1921	Originally named Michael	
103	John	1921		
104	Billie	c.1921-1922		
105	Michael	c.1927	Name transferred from 102, when sold	
106	Billy	c. 1934	Name transferred (and spelling altered) from 104, when sold)	
