= Non Parry =

Welsh singer, actress and writer

Non Parry (born 1974) is a Welsh singer, actress and writer. She is a member of the girl group Eden.

== Career ==
=== Eden ===
In 1996, Parry formed the Welsh-language pop group Eden with Rachael Solomon and Emma Walford. Initially appearing as backing singers for her cousin Caryl Parry Jones, they were signed by the record label Sain and released their debut album Paid a Bod Ofn (Don't Be Afraid) in 1997. They quickly established themselves as one of the most popular Welsh pop groups, appearing on their own prime-time TV special for S4C and from 1998, in the children's sitcom Hotel Eddie, with Parry cast as an unhygenic chef.

Eden released their second album, Yn Ôl i Eden (Back to Eden), in 1999, followed by sporadic single releases including Cer Nawr in 2003, Rhywbeth yn y Sêr in 2017 (re-released in 2022) and 'Sa Neb Fel Ti in 2021.

In 2003, Parry won the annual Cân i Gymru (Song for Wales) contest with the duet, Oes Lle I Mi?, performed as a duet with Steffan Rhys Williams and co-written by Eden bandmate Emma Walford and poet Mererid Hopwood. Parry has taken part in several Can i Gymru contests, both as a writer and a performer.

Since the mid-2010s, Eden has appeared as headliners at gigs at the National Eisteddfod and the Urdd National Eisteddfod. They continue to perform regularly as well as making Welsh TV and radio appearances, including one-off S4C specials in 2013 and 2018, alongside Elin Fflur.

=== Writing and acting ===
As a scriptwriter and actress, Parry has collaborated with Caryl Parry Jones on various projects. In 2016 and 2017, the pair co-wrote two series of the S4C comedy drama Anita. They also co-wrote the one-off children's Christmas drama Albi a Noa yn achub yr Iwnifyrs (Albi and Noa Save the Universe).

Parry appeared as 'Miss Knebworth' in the one-off comedy drama Teulu Tŷ Crwn (Round House Family) in 2012.

In 2021, Parry released her autobiography Paid a Bod Ofn (Don't Be Afraid), describing her experiences with Eden and her struggles with mental health. It won the Creative Non-Fiction category for Welsh language books at the 2022 Welsh Book of the Year Awards.

=== Podcasting ===
In 2021, Parry presented two series of Digon (Enough) for BBC Sounds, a Welsh-language podcast featuring interviews on the theme of mental health.

== Personal life ==
Originally from Rhuddlan, Parry attended Ysgol Glan Clwyd.

She lives in Pembrokeshire with her husband, actor Iwan John, and three children and two stepchildren.

Parry is a mental health advocate, having first said that she suffered from depression, anxiety and panic attacks in a February 2019 article for the Welsh-language website Meddwl, for which she is an ambassador and contributor. In March 2023, Parry said she had been diagnosed with autism, which she described as a great relief in an interview with the BBC's Newyddion programme.
