= Priodas Pum Mil =

Welsh reality tv series

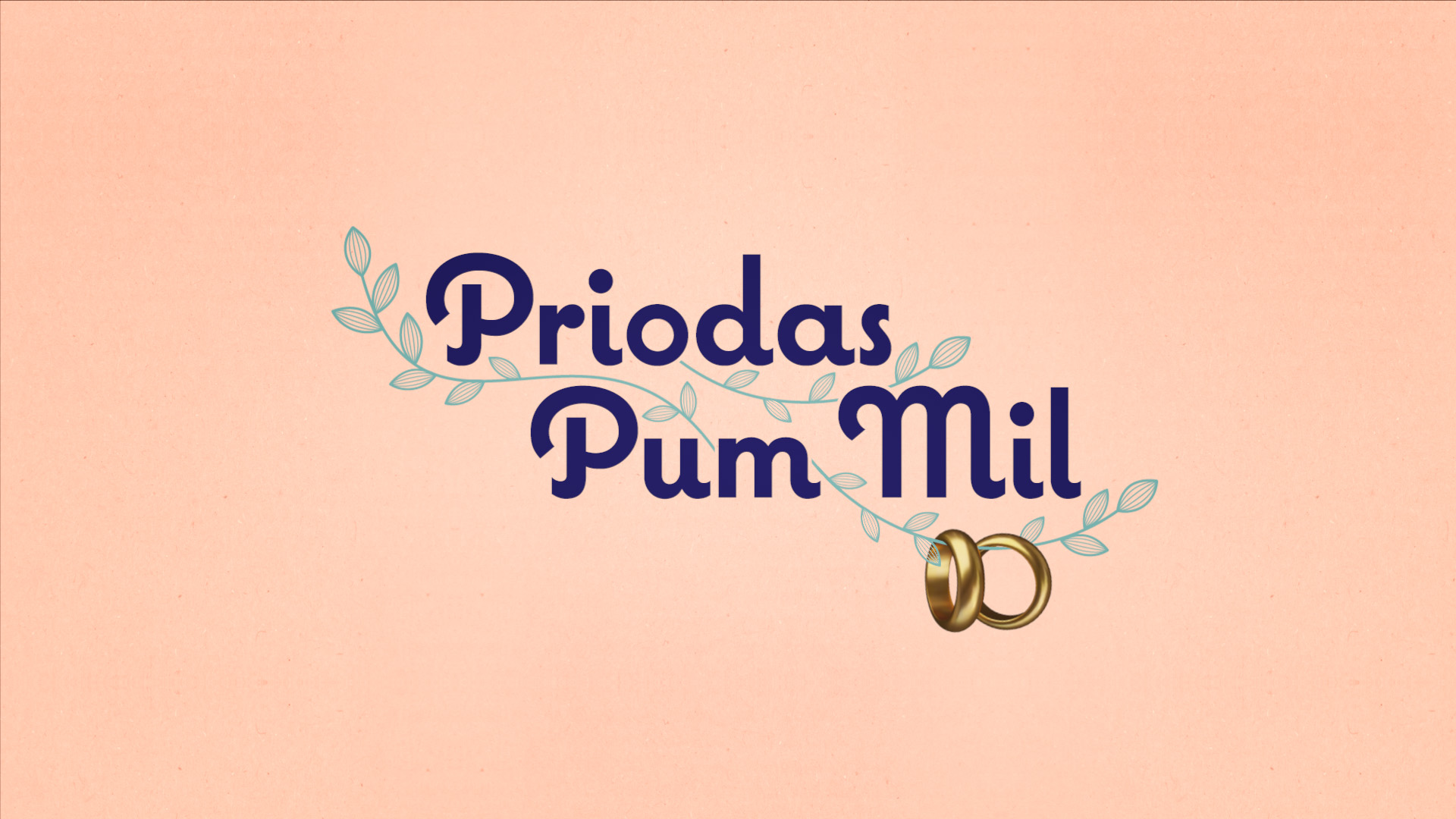
- Presented by: Emma Walford; Trystan Ellis-Morris
- Starring: Alaw Griffiths
- Country of origin: United Kingdom
- Original languages: Welsh; English
- No. of series: 8
- No. of episodes: 47 (+6 special)

Production
- Executive producer: Beca Evans
- Producer: Dwynwen Haf Wyn Owain Talfryn
- Production location: Various
- Running time: 60 minutes (inc. adverts)
- Production company: Boom Cymru

Original release
- Network: S4C
- Release: 13 November 2016 – present

Related
- Don't Tell the Bride

Priodas Pum Mil (English: Five Thousand Pound Wedding) is a Welsh reality television show which is produced for S4C and also available on BBC iPlayer. The show follows Welsh couples as they prepare to get married for less than £5,000. Trystan Ellis-Morris and Emma Walford present the series, with Alaw Griffiths, a wedding planner from Aberystwyth, at hand to offer help and guidance. The show format is similar to the successful British TV series Don't Tell the Bride but varies by requiring friends, family and the show's hosts to do the organisation.

== Format ==
The show's format consists of a couple who are given £5,000 to spend on their wedding, and inviting their family and friends to arrange the day with the help of the presenters. The couple do not get to know any details of the arrangements but the hope is that they will enjoy an unforgettable day. The wedding ceremony must be organised; every aspect of event and attire, including the wedding dress, as well as the transportation, location, food and surprising the bride and groom. Although the series mostly features heterosexual couples, some episodes broadcast features gay and lesbian couples.

== Episodes ==
Series	Episodes	Originally released	
Series	Episodes	First released	Last released
1	6	13 November 2016	18 December 2016
2	6	26 December 2017	30 January 2018
3	6	8 January 2019	12 February 2019
4	8	23 February 2020	12 April 2020
Lockdown Special		31 May 2020	
Live Special		16 July 2021	
5	6	7 November 2021	12 December 2021
Christmas Special		26 December 2021	
Christmas Special		27 December 2022	
6	5	29 January 2023	26 February 2023
Christmas Special		24 December 2023	
7	5	31 December 2023	28 January 2024
Christmas Special		25 December 2024	
8	5	5 January 2025	22 February 2025

=== Series 1 (2016) ===
No. overall	No. in series	Title	Original release date	U.K viewers (millions)
1	1	"Bethesda"	13 November 2016	0.032
Nia and Iolo from Bethesda entrust the planning of their wedding entirely to family and friends, with a budget of £5,000.
2	2	"Ponterwyd"	20 November 2016	0.033
Local couple Llyr & Emma from Devil's Bridge are the second couple to get hitched. Can their friends and family arrange a day to remember for £5,000?
3	3	"Criccieth"	27 November 2016	0.031
Mark and Lelia from Cricieth are leaving their friends and family in charge of their wedding day.
4	4	"Caernarfon"	4 December 2016	N/A (<0.023)
A couple from Caernarfon entrust organising their wedding entirely to family and friends. Will Allan and Stephanie be happy with their wedding day plans?
5	5	"Newport"	11 December 2016	0.024
Rhys and Hannah from Newport, Pembrokeshire, entrust the planning of their wedding to family and friends, who are given a budget of £5,000 while the bride and groom are kept entirely in the dark about their big day.
6	6	"Anglesey"	18 December 2016	0.022
Gerallt and Carolyn from Anglesey entrust their wedding to family and friends, who have a budget of £5,000 to give the couple a big day to remember. But with the bride and groom completely in the dark about the ceremony, have they made a huge mistake?

=== Series 2 (2017−2018) ===
No. overall	No. in series	Title	Original release date	U.K viewers (millions)
7	1	"Ceredigion"	26 December 2017	N/A (<0.029)
Trystan Ellis-Morris and Emma Walford lend a helping hand to family and friends responsible for organising the wedding of Elliw and Steen in Ceredigion.
8	2	"Chwilog"	2 January 2018	0.038
Family and friends of Trystan Ellis-Morris and Emma Walford in Chwilog are responsible for organising the wedding of their dreams. Can they achieve their goals?
9	3	"Glamorgan"	9 January 2018	0.024
Trystan and Jasmine from the Vale of Glamorgan entrust their wedding to family and friends, with Trystan Ellis-Morris and Emma Walford there to lend a helping hand.
10	4	"Deiniolen"	16 January 2018	0.037
They family and friends of Rhys and Sophie are organising their wedding in Deiniolen.
11	5	"Cardiff"	23 January 2018	0.026
This week the show will lend a helping hand to family and friends responsible for organising a wedding for Shelly and Viccie from Cardiff and the South Wales Valleys.
12	6	"Dolgellau"	30 January 2018	0.034
Lora and Will from Dolgellau hand over control of their wedding to family and friends, with Trystan Ellis-Morris and Emma Walford there to lend a helping hand.

=== Series 3 (2019) ===
No. overall	No. in series	Title	Original release date	U.K viewers (millions)
13	1	"Blaenau Ffestiniog"	8 January 2019	0.043
Trystan Ellis-Morris and Emma Walford lend a helping hand to a crew of family and friends who are organising a wedding in Blaenau Ffestiniog for local couple Iola and Lee. Will they be able to succeed in their unusual location?
14	2	"Newborough"	15 January 2019	0.039
This week the show lends a helping hand to a crew of family and friends who are organising a wedding for Sophie and James from Newborough, Anglesey.
15	3	"Carmarthen"	22 January 2019	0.054
This episode lends a helping hand to a crew of family and friends who are organising a wedding in the Carmarthen area for local couple Elin and Steven.
16	4	"Caernarfon"	29 January 2019	0.030
The presenters lend a helping hand to a crew of family and friends who are organising a wedding in Bethel, near Caernarfon, for local couple Carys and Dyfed.
17	5	"Pontyberem"	5 February 2019	0.045
Family and friends lend a helping hand organising a car themed wedding in the Pontyberem area for local couple Louise and Dai. Will they get the wedding of their dreams?
18	6	"Bangor"	12 February 2019	0.022
The last episode of the series lends a helping hand to a crew of family and friends who are organising the first destination wedding of the series, for Sarah and Gwion from Bangor, North Wales. The bride and groom have their hearts set on a Las Vegas wedding - is a £5000 Stateside surprise-packed day possible, or is this a challenge too far?

=== Series 4 (2020) ===
No. overall	No. in series	Title	Original release date	U.K viewers (millions)
19	1	"Gwalchmai"	23 February 2020	0.025
Trystan Ellis-Morris and Emma Walford lend a helping hand to a crew of family and friends who are organising a wedding for Sioned and Kenny from Gwalchmai, Anglesey.
20	2	"Pwllheli"	1 March 2020	0.039
Trystan Ellis-Morris and Emma Walford lend a helping hand to a crew of family and friends who are organising a wedding in Pwllheli for local couple Vicky and Chris.
21	3	"Trelech"	8 March 2020	0.025
Trystan Ellis-Morris and Emma Walford lend a hand to a crew of family and friends who are organising a dairy-themed wedding in Carmarthenshire for Rhoswen and Peter from Trelech.
22	4	"Porthmadog"	15 March 2020	0.041
Trystan Ellis-Morris and Emma Walford help a crew of family and friends who are organising a wedding by the sea for couple Bryn and Kerry from Porthmadog.
23	5	"Gaerwen"	22 March 2020	0.034
Trystan Ellis-Morris and Emma Walford lend a helping hand to a crew of family and friends who are organising an island church wedding for couple Lynne and Dafydd from Gaerwen. The pressure is on to provide the experience while keeping things on-budget.
24	6	"Caernarfon"	29 March 2020	0.038
Trystan Ellis-Morris and Emma Walford lend a helping hand to a crew of family and friends who are organising a wedding for Deiniol and Sorrell from Caernarfon. The groom is a big fan of fantasy television series full of dragons and castles, but the bride is not so keen.
25	7	"Cefneithin"	5 April 2020	0.034
Trystan Ellis-Morris and Emma Walford lend a helping hand to a crew of family and friends who are organising a wedding for Cefneithin couple Olivia and Jon.
26	8	"Conwy"	12 April 2020	0.046
Trystan Ellis-Morris and Emma Walford lend a helping hand to a crew of family and friends who this time are organising a wedding for Manon and Marc from Conwy.

=== Lockdown Special (2020) ===
No. overall	No. in series	Title	Original release date	U.K viewers (millions)
27	1	"Priodas Pum Mil Dan Glo"	31 May 2020	0.021
Trystan Ellis-Morris and Emma Walford lend a helping hand to a crew of family and friends who this time are organising a special wedding blessing for Danny and Nia who live in Llangefni. Both bride and groom are huge film fans and love family life. But in this episode there is one huge difference to the usual wedding day organisation; this blessing is taking place during the national lockdown amid the spread of COVID-19.

=== Live Special (2021) ===
No. overall	No. in series	Title	Original release date	U.K viewers (millions)
28	1	"Priodas Pum Mil o’r Traeth"	16 July 2021	0.022
An exciting programme that's part of a week celebrating Welsh beaches. Stuart and Siân from Gwynedd are the lucky couple who have won the chance to get married live on a beach on S4C. After winning a national vote the pair have no say over any of the details of their big day and have to trust that their friends, family and Emma and Trystan the presenters will organise the perfect wedding for £5K.

=== Series 5 (2021) ===
No. overall	No. in series	Title	Original release date	U.K viewers (millions)
29	1	"Pentraeth"	7 November 2021	N/A
Trystan Ellis-Morris and Emma Walford lend a helping hand to a crew of family and friends who are organising an Alice in Wonderland-themed wedding for Lucy and Mair.
30	2	"Mynytho"	14 November 2021	N/A
This time, a New York themed wedding for Emma and Simon from Mynytho.
31	3	"Ewloe"	21 November 2021	N/A
Trystan Ellis-Morris and Emma Walford lend a helping hand to a crew of family and friends organising a wedding for Olwen and Alun who live in Ewloe in Flintshire. The groom is a Wrexham Football Club fan and the bride is an avid reader of 19thc romantic novels.
32	4	"Pandy Tudur"	28 November 2021	N/A
This time: will a wedding full of children and animals be a challenge too far for friends and family? Trystan Ellis-Morris and Emma Walford lend a helping hand to a crew of family and friends organising a wedding for Lowri and Ryan who live in Pandy Tudur.
33	5	"Caernarfon"	5 December 2021	N/A
A wedding for a couple interested in Celtic Wales, involving a local druid and hand-fasting ceremony. Trystan Ellis-Morris and Emma Walford lend a helping hand to a crew of family and friends organising a wedding for Emma and Euron who live in Caernarfon.
34	6	"Gwalchmai"	12 December 2021	N/A
They say that a little rain on your wedding day is a sign of good luck, and there's no avoiding the downpour in this wedding! Trystan Ellis-Morris and Emma Walford lend a helping hand to a crew of family and friends who are organising a wedding for Gwenllian and Deiniol from Gwalchmai, Anglesey.

=== Christmas Special (2021) ===
No. overall	No. in series	Title	Original release date	U.K viewers (millions)
35	1	"Priodas Pum Mil 'Dolig"	26 December 2021	N/A
Trystan Ellis-Morris and Emma Walford lend a helping hand to a crew of family and friends organising a cosy seasonal wedding at a nearby mansion for couple Rhian and Stuart from Tregaron.

=== Christmas Special (2022) ===
No. overall	No. in series	Title	Original release date	U.K viewers (millions)
36	1	"Priodas Pum Mil 'Dolig"	27 December 2022	N/A
Trystan Ellis-Morris and Emma Walford lend a helping hand to a crew of family and friends who are organising a Christmas wedding in Blaenau Ffestiniog for couple Emma and Lee. Key to the plan is giving the couple's three children plenty to do, with daughter Cadi making mince pies, son Tomos preparing a special speech and youngest Non helping out wherever - not to mention organising a Christmas performance from the bride's favourite band.

=== Series 6 (2023) ===
No. overall	No. in series	Title	Original release date	U.K viewers (millions)
37	1	"Rhydyclafdy"	29 January 2023	N/A
In the popular S4C series Priodas Pum Mil, the happy couple have usually already agreed to get married. But the next episode of Priodas Pum Mil, begins in a completely different way with a big surprise in a helicopter as Tom Evans asks his girlfriend Charlotte Williams to marry him! The couple, who live in Rhydyclafdy near Pwllheli, with their year-old son Twm, were celebrating Charlotte’s birthday with a flight over Tom’s family farm. But there is one more surprise to come as the helicopter lands – would the two be willing to get married on Priodas Pum Mil?
38	2	"Dylife"	5 February 2023	N/A
This time, the happy couple only have one wedding location in mind: the Royal Welsh Showground! Tonight's episode showed Gwen and Hedd from Dylife, Mid Wales tie the knot for under £5,000 total at the Royal Welsh Showground in Llanelwedd. The wedding day was organised by family and friends who kept the arrangements secret until the big day, including the details of Gwen's dress.
39	3	"Llangennech"	12 February 2023	N/A
This time on Priodas Pum Mil, bride to be Miriam Horton just loves a bit of romance – and she wants her big day to be very romantic but her partner Joe Hughes wants something a little more chilled with a festival vibe. Can Emma Walford and Trystan Ellis Morris – with the help of the happy couple’s family and friends – organise a day to remember which will please Miriam, Joe and their children Marley and Eden.
40	4	"Llanuwchllyn"	19 February 2023	N/A
This time, Trystan Ellis-Morris and Emma Walford are going to Llanuwchllyn, near Bala to help organise the wedding of Shan Ranson and Alun Jones. The engaged couple farm on the hills near the village, with the help of their two children Ifan and Ana. The couple met at Cerrigydrudion Show dance and have been together nearly 30 years.
41	5	"Llandysul"	26 February 2023	N/A
A couple from Llandysul get married.

=== Christmas Special (2023) ===
No. overall	No. in series	Title	Original release date	U.K viewers (millions)
42	1	"Priodas Pum Mil 'Dolig"	24 December 2023	N/A

== Prosiect Pum Mil ==
Priodas Pum Mil
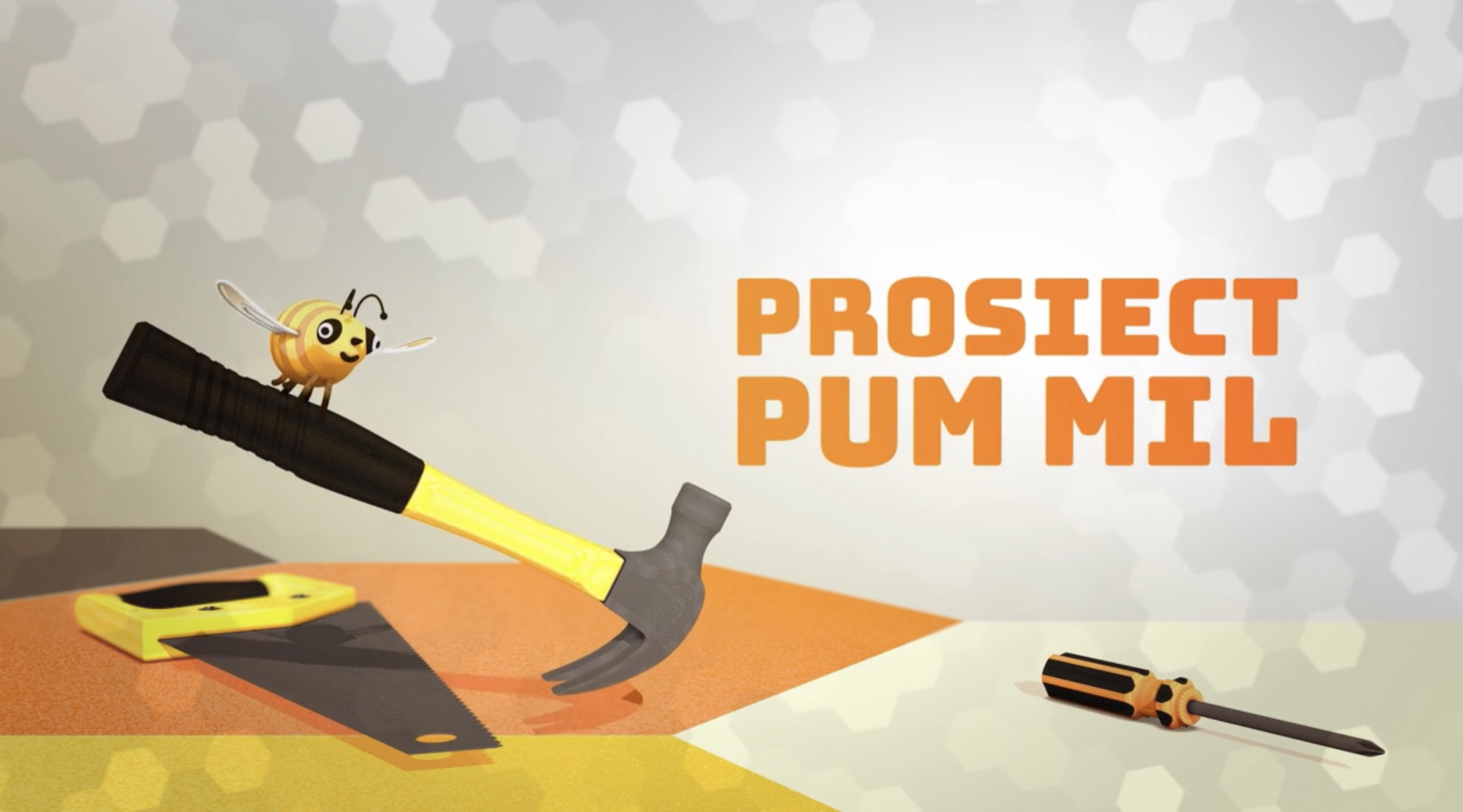
- Series 1 logo
- Also known as: Prosiect Pum Mil
- Presented by: Emma Walford; Trystan Ellis-Morris
- Starring: Gwyn Eiddior
- Country of origin: United Kingdom
- Original languages: Welsh; English
- No. of series: 5
- No. of episodes: 26

Production
- Executive producer: Beca Evans
- Producer: Catrin Honeybill
- Running time: 60 minutes (inc. adverts)
- Production company: Boom Cymru

Original release
- Network: S4C; BBC iPlayer
- Release: 1 October 2019 – present

=== Premise ===
This series is part of the "Priodas Pum Mil" brand with many elements common to both formats, with the Welsh community at the heart of the series. This is a series where teams of characters from different communities will undertake a building and refurbishment project that will benefit their community or area. Presenters Trystan Ellis-Morris and Emma Walford will be travelling across Wales trying to create community projects for just five thousand pounds.

=== Episodes ===
Year(s)	Episodes	Originally released	
Year(s)	Episodes	First released	Last released
1	6	1 October 2019	24 December 2019
2	6	22 November 2020	22 December 2020
3	4	11 September 2022	9 October 2022
4	5	5 November 2023	3 December 2023
5	5	4 May 2025	1 June 2025

== Awards and nominations ==
Year	Award	Category	Result	Refs
2019	BAFTA Cymru	Entertainment programme	Won	
2020	Royal Television Society	Best Factual Programme	Nominated	
2020	Celtic Media Festival	Best Entertainment Programme	Won	
2020	BAFTA Cymru	Best Presenter	Won	
