= Don't Tell the Bride (British TV series) =

British reality TV series

- Narrated by: Ruth Jones (2007); Rebekah Staton (2008–2020); Zoe Ball (2015)
- Country of origin: United Kingdom
- Original language: English
- No. of series: 14
- No. of episodes: 164

Production
- Production location: Various
- Running time: 60 minutes
- Production company: Renegade Pictures – part of Warner Bros. Television Productions UK

Original release
- Network: BBC Three (2007–2014); BBC One (2015); Sky 1 (2016); E4 (2017–2020)
- Release: 8 November 2007 – 16 March 2020

Don't Tell the Bride is a British reality television series. The premise of the series surrounds couples being awarded money to fund their wedding ceremony; however, every aspect of the ceremony must be organised by the groom, with no contact with the bride. On 29 September 2023, it was announced there were no plans for the series to return.

== Broadcast history ==
The series first premiered on BBC Three on 8 November 2007. In February 2012, it was announced that the show had been nominated for a Rose d'Or award for best 'Factual Entertainment' show. Due to the impending shutdown of BBC Three as a linear television service, the 9th series of the programme was moved to BBC One. With the confirmed shutdown of BBC Three, as well as falling viewership in response to changes in the programme's format that occurred upon the move, the BBC dropped Don't Tell the Bride. The series was then picked up for its 2016 series by Sky 1. In 2017, it moved to E4 where it would broadcast a new 18-episode series later that year.

Reruns of the show, including the BBC and Sky One series are currently broadcast on E4 Extra.

== Format ==
The show's format consists of a couple who are given £12,000 (£14,000 in the BBC One and E4 versions) to spend on their wedding. However, they must spend three weeks apart with no contact, and the groom must organise every aspect of the event and attire, including the wedding dress, wedding cake, as well as the hen and stag parties, surprising the bride.

Although the series mostly features heterosexual couples, one episode broadcast in October 2010 featured a gay couple and another in November 2011 featured a lesbian couple, both preparing for their civil partnership.

== Reception ==
- Nominated: Factual Entertainment – Rose d'Or 2012
- Nominated: Reality & Constructed Factual – British Academy Television Awards 2012

== Transmissions ==
BBC Three

Series	Start date	End date	Episodes
1	8 November 2007	20 December 2007	6
2	26 August 2008	30 September 2008	6
3	1 September 2009	10 November 2009	11
4	17 August 2010	2 November 2010	12
5	6 September 2011	29 November 2011	12
6	14 August 2012	30 October 2012	12
7	20 August 2013	5 November 2013	12
8	5 August 2014	21 October 2014	12
9	5 August 2015	21 October 2015	12
10	28 October 2015	15 December 2015	8

BBC One

Series	Start date	End date	Episodes
11	24 June 2015	29 July 2015	6

Sky 1

Series	Start date	End date	Episodes
12	21 July 2016	25 August 2016	6

E4

Series	Start date	End date	Episodes
13	26 July 2017	31 January 2018	18
14	15 August 2018	16 March 2020	30

=== Specials ===
Title	Air date	Host
Most Memorable Moments	12 January 2016	Stacey Dooley
Bridezillas & Bromances	5 January 2016	Stacey Dooley
Mad, Bad & Dangerous	29 December 2015	Stacey Dooley
Christmas Special Clip Show	22 December 2015	Stacey Dooley
Let it Snow	22 December 2014	—N/a
Christmas on the Slopes	19 December 2013	Rebekah Staton
Christmas on Ice	18 December 2012	—N/a
Christmas Revenge 2012	11 December 2012	—N/a
Goes Global	6 November 2012	Ellie Taylor
Best Ever	14 August 2012	Scott Mills
Greatest Moments Cutdown	15 April–13 June 2012	Cherry Healey
Mother's Day	13 March 2012	—N/a
Valentine's	13 February 2012	—N/a
Don't Tell the Bride-to-be: The Proposals	13 February 2012	—N/a
Christmas in Wonderland	20 December 2011	—N/a
Christmas Revenge	13 December 2011	—N/a
Live: Royal Wedding Special	29 April 2011	Cherry Healey
Greatest Moments 2011	28 April 2011	Cherry Healey
Greatest Moments 2010	23 November 2010	Patsy Palmer
The Brides' Revenge	21 April 2010	—N/a

== International versions ==
Internationally, the series has attracted a strong following, with broadcast deals spanning 120 territories.

As of 2012, twelve locally produced versions have aired around the world. They are: Australia (Network 10, 2012), Denmark (TV 2, 2009–), Finland (Liv), Greece & Cyprus (ANT1, 2011), Germany (RTL II, 2011–), Ireland (RTÉ, 2010–), Italy (Lei), Norway (TLC Norway), Poland (TLC Poland, 2011), Sweden (TV4), Turkey and United States. Various clips from some versions were shown in the 'Goes Global' special in 2012.

The UK version has also been picked up by Russian broadcaster TLC, Vivolta in France, NHK in Japan and RTL Nederland in the Netherlands, who has secured an option to produce a local version of the format.

An Irish version of the show airs on RTÉ Two since 2010. A two episode Irish special, in which the couple's budget was €10,000, was first broadcast in May 2011 on RTÉ. A full series was aired in 2012. The Irish version also airs on Living in New Zealand and on Really in the UK.

In October 2011, the first series of the US version of Don't Tell The Bride was shown on OWN. In this version, the groom is given USD $25,000 to spend. In 2013, the series is being produced by Shed Media US for the USA Network. Shed Media conducted casting for the series between 14 June 2013 through 19 July 2013.

On 21 August 2012, an Australian version of Don't Tell the Bride began airing on Network Ten. Kate Ritchie was the narrator. In this version, the groom is given A$25,000 to organise the entire wedding. It was cancelled after one season.

In November 2016, a similarly formatted Welsh-language reality television show titled Priodas Pum Mil premiered on S4C.

On 31 August 2020 the most watched channel in Portugal, SIC, released their version of the show called "O Noivo é que Sabe" hosted by the actress Cláudia Vieira.
