= Ysgol Glan Clwyd =

Welsh-language secondary school in Wales

Ysgol Uwchradd Glan Clwyd
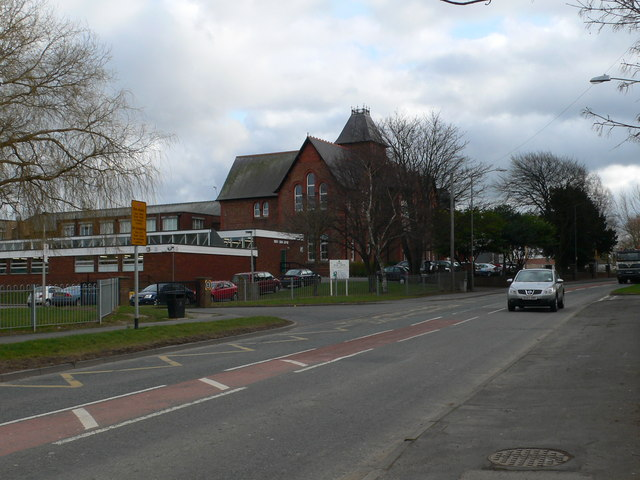
- Ysgol Glan Clwyd (old building)

Location
- Upper Denbigh Rd; St Asaph, Denbighshire, LL17 0RP; Wales; 53°15′18″N 3°26′18″W

Information
- Other name: YGC
- Type: Welsh medium secondary school
- Motto: Harddwch, Dysg, Doethineb (Beauty, Learning, Wisdom)
- Established: 1956; 70 years ago
- Local authority: Denbighshire
- Department for Education URN: 401693 Tables
- Head teacher: Sian Alwen
- Gender: Mixed
- Age range: 11–19
- Enrolment: 1048 (2025)
- Language: Welsh-medium
- Houses: Dewi; Hywel; Arthur
- Colours: Navy, blue and yellow
- Website: ysgolglanclwyd.co.uk/en/home/

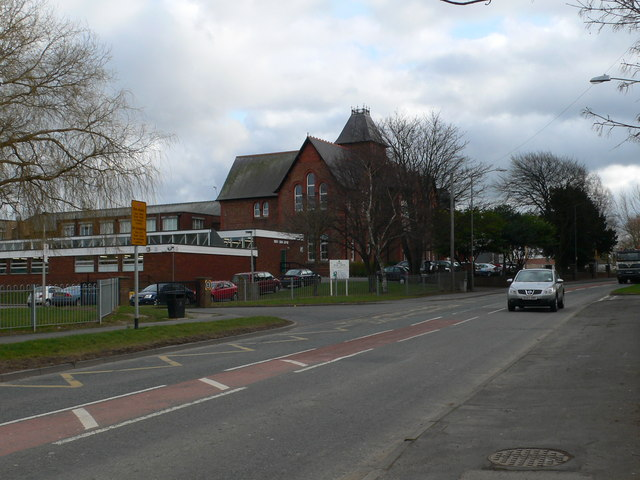
Ysgol Glan Clwyd (old building)(pre 2017)

Ysgol Glan Clwyd (or Ysgol Uwchradd Glan Clwyd) is a designated Welsh-medium secondary school for pupils aged 11–19 years old. The school serves the northern parts of Denbighshire, as well as parts of Flintshire and east Conwy and is overseen by the Denbighshire Local Education Authority. Glan Clwyd was the first Welsh-medium secondary school in Wales. It opened in 1956, initially at Rhyl on the coast before moving inland to St Asaph in 1969.

== Present ==
As of 2025, the school has 1048 students, of whom 160 are in the sixth form.

In 2022, it was reported that 56.2% of students came from Welsh-speaking homes. In 2012, 64% of pupils came from homes where Welsh was spoken. However, the school indicated that 23% of pupils came from a background where Welsh was the household’s main or only language.

All subjects are taught in Welsh apart from English and a few in the sixth form.

There is a class for non-Welsh speakers to learn Welsh. Later in school, these pupils join mainstream classes.

The school has been reconstructed and refurbished in regards to Denbighshire County Council's twenty-first century school modernisation plan. The new building and refurbishment officially opened in September 2017, but pupils were moved into the building when the school opened in January 2017.

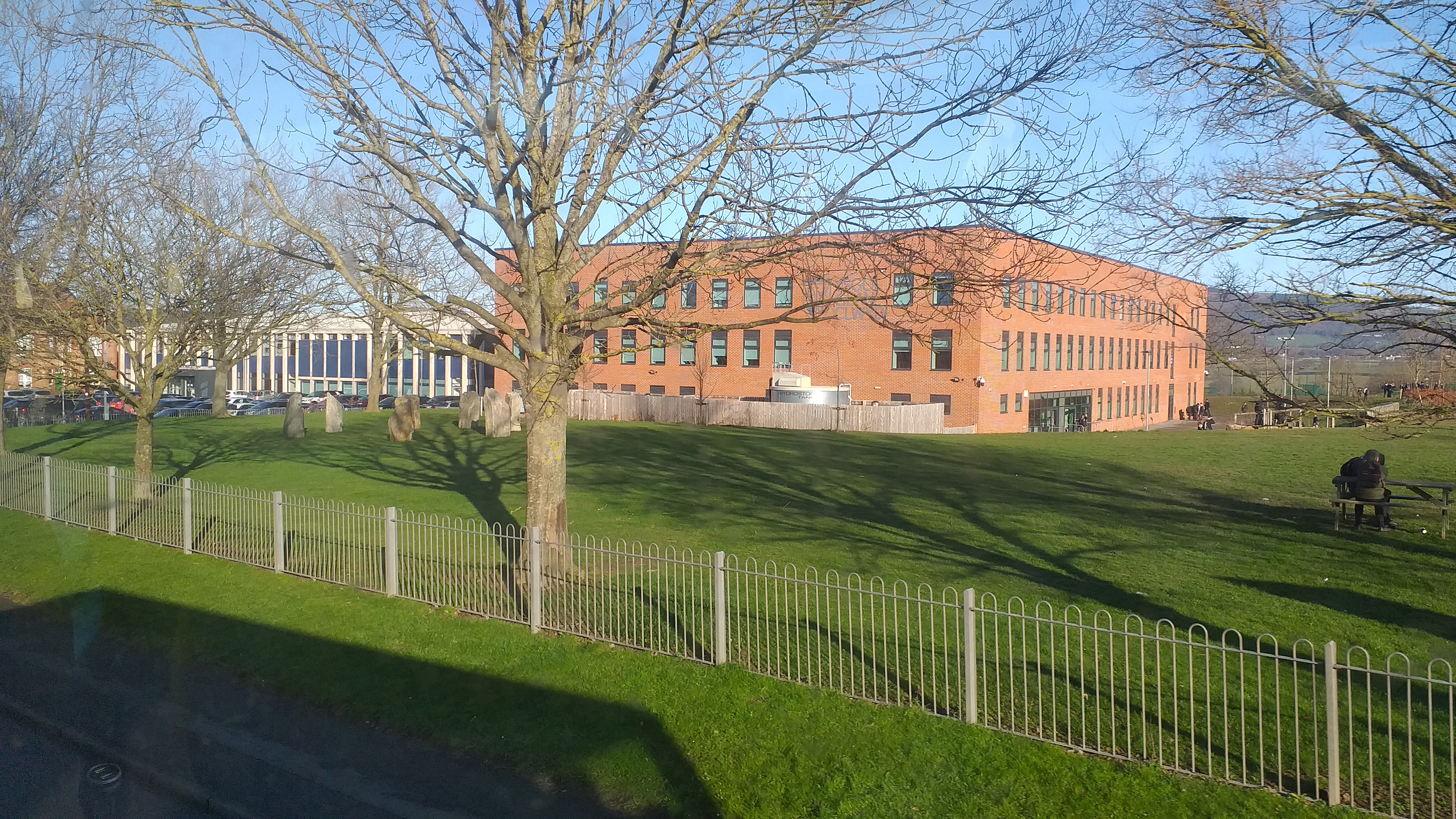
Ysgol Glan Clwyd in 2017

== Musical theatre ==
Musical theatre is important in Ysgol Glan Clwyd. The school has recently put on a musical under the name of Sioe Y Sioeau, which included songs from The Lion King and Hairspray. It also included the play Blood Brothers.

The school has also recently performed a show called "Yn y Dechreuad" or "In the Beginning" about how and why the school started and its journey to what the school is today.

== Notable former pupils ==
- Tara Bethan, actress and singer
- Becky Brewerton golf player
- Amber Davies, actress
- Eleri Earnshaw, association football coach and former Wales international
- Gareth Jones (Gaz Top), television presenter
- Lisa Gwilym, radio and TV presenter
- Peredur Owen Griffiths, member of the Senedd for South Wales East
- Caryl Parry Jones, entertainer
- Non Parry, actress and singer
- Manon Rhys, writer
- Rachael Solomon, singer and TV producer
- Rebecca Trehearn, actress
- Bryn Williams, chef
- Arfon Haines Davies, broadcaster
- Mared Williams, singer-songwriter
