= Rachael Solomon =

Welsh singer, choreographer and television presenter

Rachael Solomon (born 1974) is a Welsh singer, choreographer and television producer.

Solomon, originally from St Asaph, is part of the Welsh-language pop group Eden alongside Emma Walford and Non Parry.

== Career ==
=== Eden ===
Solomon, who attended Ysgol Glan Clwyd,was part of the Eden group which formed in 1996, then signed by the record label Sain before releasing their debut album Paid a Bod Ofn (Don't Be Afraid) in 1997. They quickly established themselves as one of the most popular Welsh pop groups, appearing on their own prime-time TV special for S4C. Eden released their second album, Yn Ôl i Eden (Back to Eden), in 1999, followed by sporadic single releases including Cer Nawr in 2003, Rhywbeth yn y Sêr in 2017 (re-released in 2022) and 'Sa Neb Fel Ti in 2021.

Since the mid-2010s, Eden has appeared as headliners at gigs at the National Eisteddfod and the Urdd National Eisteddfod. They continue to perform as well as making Welsh TV and radio appearances, including one-off S4C specials in 2013 and 2018, alongside Elin Fflur.

=== Television ===
As an actress, Solomon appeared with her Eden bandmates in the S4C children's sitcom Hotel Eddie and played the role of Welsh learner Jaci Roberts in Talk About Welsh, the HTV drama series for Welsh learners, between 1996 and 2001.

From 2007, she joined S4C as an in-vision continuity presenter for Planed Plant Bach, S4C's programming strand for young children, which relaunched the following year as Cyw. She left the service, alongside co-presenter Gareth Delve, in 2015.

Solomon is a television producer and researcher, primarily working for the ITV Studios-owned production company Boom Cymru. She won the 2020 RTS Cymru Wales award for Best Breakthrough.
