= Ffynnongroyw =

Village in Flintshire, Wales

Coordinates: 53.330°N 3.300°W

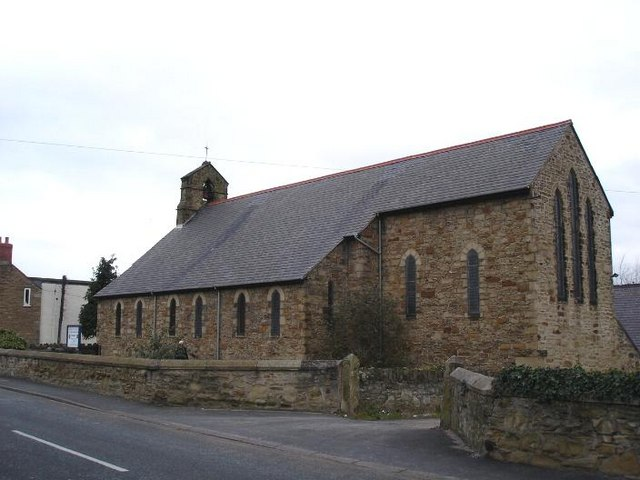
- The parish church, Ffynnongroyw

- Location within Flintshire
- Population: 1,808 (2011)
- OS grid reference: SJ134823
- Principal area: Flintshire
- Preserved county: Clwyd
- Country: Wales
- Sovereign state: United Kingdom
- Post town: HOLYWELL
- Postcode district: CH8
- Dialling code: 01745
- Police: North Wales
- Fire: North Wales
- Ambulance: Welsh
- UK Parliament: Clwyd East
- Senedd Cymru – Welsh Parliament: Delyn

Ffynnongroyw (sometimes spelled Ffynnongroew) is a village in Flintshire, north Wales. It is situated on the A548 road, near the Dee Estuary coast, near Prestatyn.

== Etymology ==
The name Ffynnongroyw is from the Welsh word "Ffynnon" meaning well and "groyw" meaning clear or pure. The original well is still in existence and is situated on Well Lane in the village.

== Parishes / electoral wards ==
The population of this area is now shown under the community of Llanasa and only the electoral ward remains. The total population of this ward taken at the 2011 census was 1,808. The electoral ward includes Talacre and Picton. Taking away the population of Talacre, the population of the Ffynnongroyw is roughly 1461.

== Industry ==
Nearby is the site of the old Point of Ayr Colliery which opened and developed in the late nineteenth century. As a result, the population of Ffynnongroyw grew considerably during this period with people migrating there from many different regions of Wales and England. Before the Colliery opened the village was all fields with only a few little cottages. Most of the numerous terraced houses to be found in the village were built between 1890 and 1920.

== Notable people ==
- Osian Ellis (1928–2021), harpist, composer and teacher
- Roy Vernon (1937–1993) footballer with 406 club caps and 32 for Wales
- Caryl Parry Jones (born 1958), singer-songwriter, broadcaster, actress, author and composer
