= Rhyl =

Coastal town in North Wales

Rhyl: Welsh: Y Rhyl
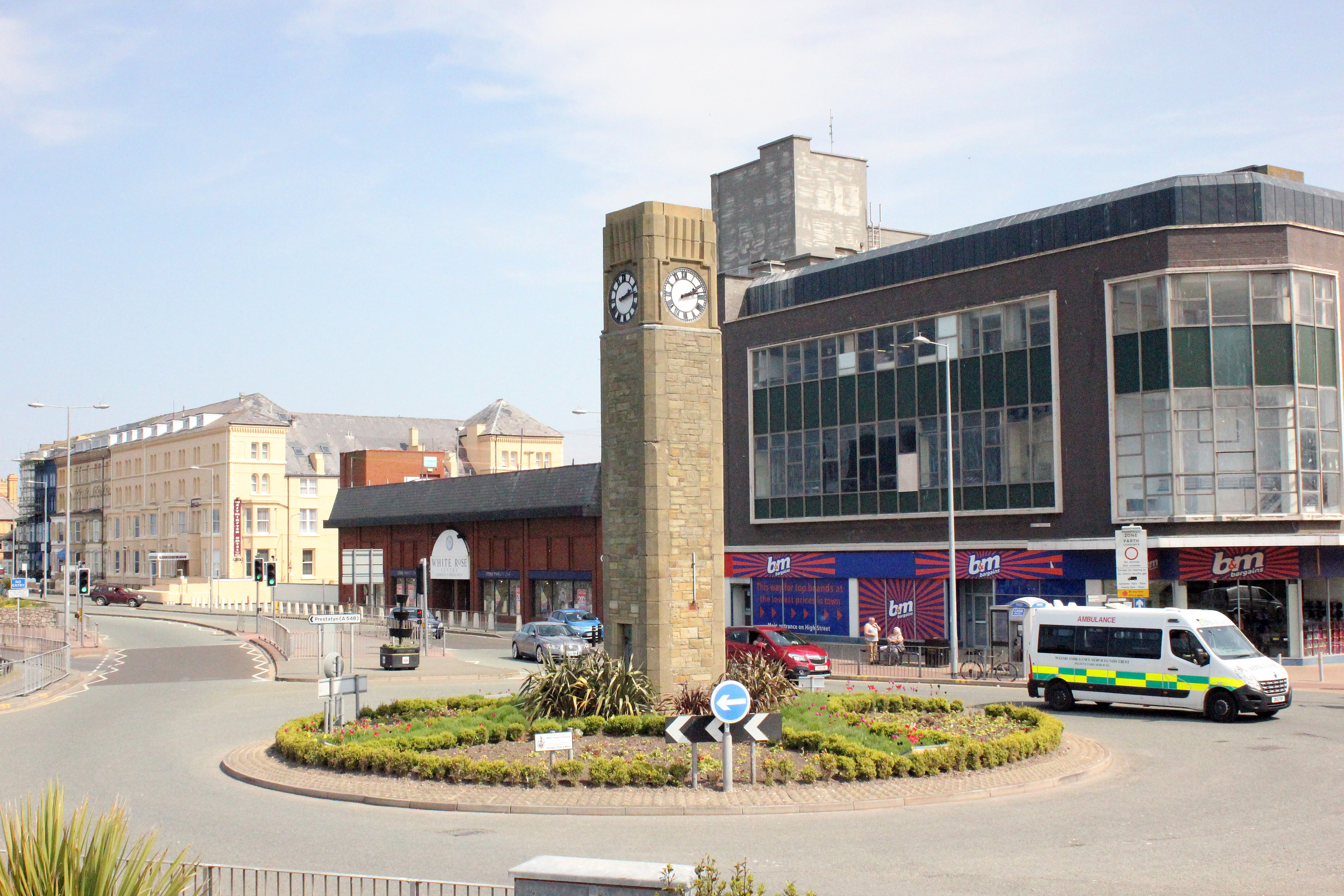
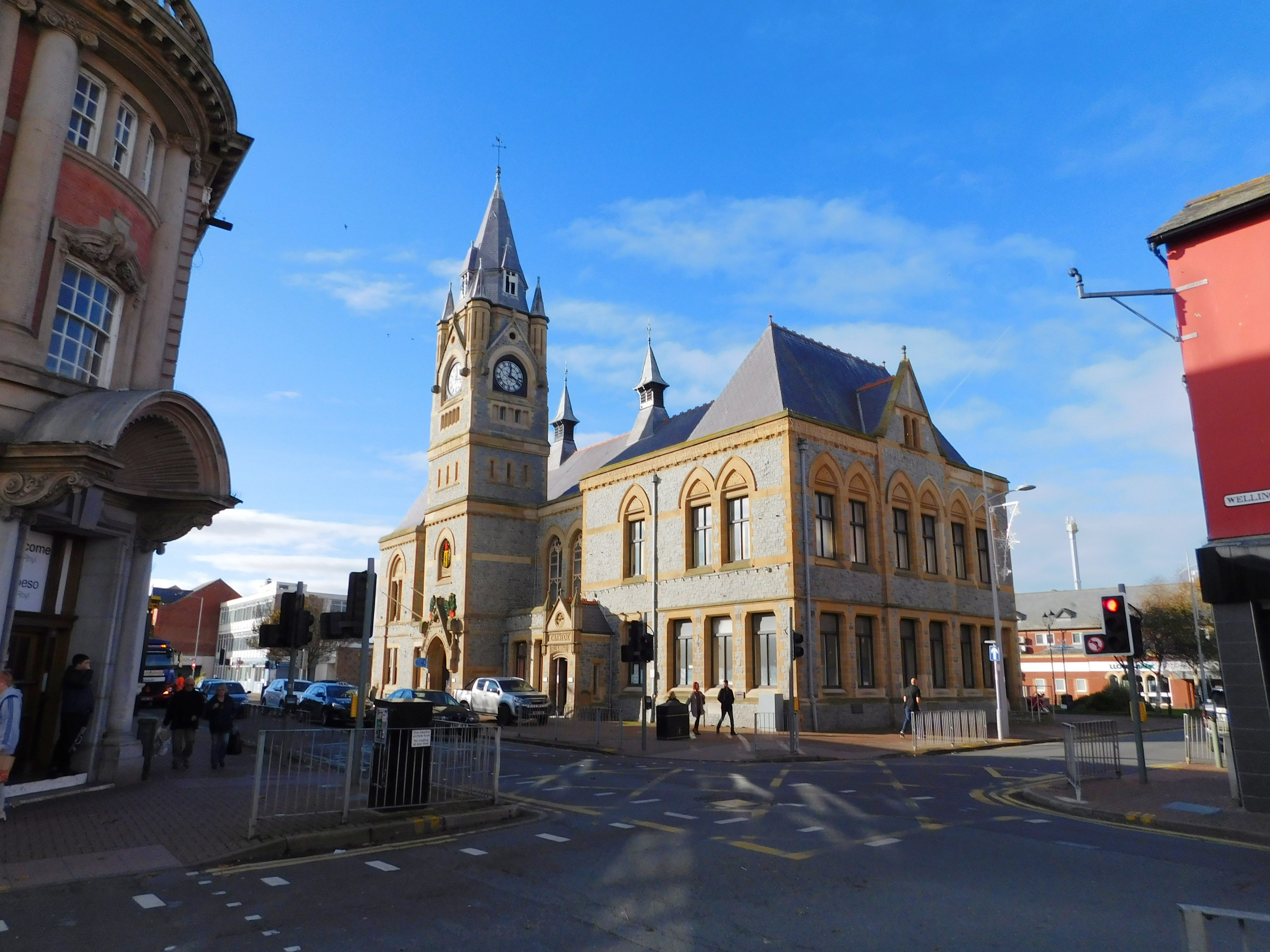
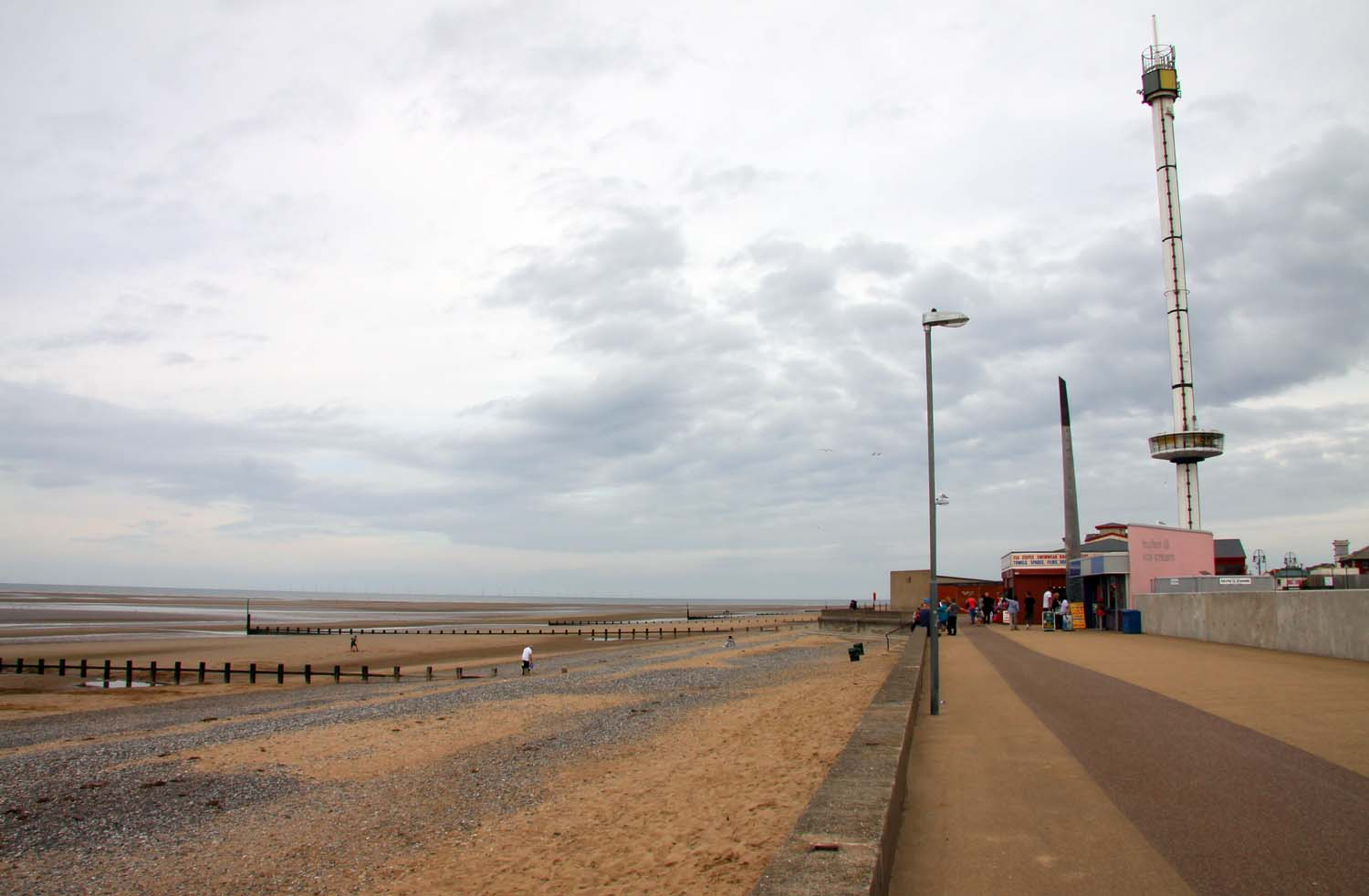
- From the top: The Clocktower, Rhyl Town Hall and Rhyl Seafront

- Location within Denbighshire
- Population: 27,325 (2021)
- OS grid reference: SJ015815
- Community: Rhyl
- Principal area: Denbighshire
- Preserved county: Clwyd
- Country: Wales
- Sovereign state: United Kingdom
- Post town: RHYL
- Postcode district: LL18
- Dialling code: 01745
- Police: North Wales
- Fire: North Wales
- Ambulance: Welsh
- UK Parliament: Clwyd North
- Senedd Cymru – Welsh Parliament: Vale of Clwyd
- List of places UK Wales Denbighshire 53.321°N 3.480°W Map of the community

Rhyl (/rɪl/; Welsh: Y Rhyl, pronounced [ə ˈr̥ɨl]) is a seaside town and community in Denbighshire in Wales. The town lies on the north coast of Wales, at the mouth of the River Clwyd.

To the west is Kinmel Bay and Towyn, to the east Prestatyn, and to the south-east Rhuddlan and St Asaph.

At the 2021 Census, Rhyl had a population of 27,325. Rhyl forms a conurbation with Prestatyn and its two outlying villages, the Rhyl/Prestatyn Built-up area, whose 2021 population of 45,250 makes it North Wales's most populous non-city. Adding to that the adjoining town of Kinmel Bay it is around 50,000.

Rhyl was once an elegant Victorian resort town, but suffered rapid decline around the 1990s and 2000s; attempts have been made to reverse this through county investment, equal to around £15 million from Denbighshire County, however, the outcomes have been perceived with varying levels of success.

Prior to being in Denbighshire since 1996, it was in the Clwyd district of Rhuddlan, and before that the historic county of Flintshire.

== Etymology ==
Early documents refer to a dwelling in the area named Ty'n Rhyl ("Rhyl croft"), and a manor house with that name still exists in the oldest part of the town. Its Welsh orthography has proved difficult for English writers to transliterate as Rhyl's opening voiceless alveolar trill is uncommon in the English language (represented in modern Welsh by the digraph 'Rh'). As such the name has appeared in English texts as Hulle (1292), Hul (1296), Ryhull (1301), Hyll (1506), Hull (1508), yr Hyll (1597), Rhil (1706), Rhûl (1749), Rhul (1773), Rhyll (1830) and Rhyl (1840).

The etymonic origin of the word Rhyl has been the subject of debate for more than a century. It has been suggested that it derives from a contraction of Yr Heol ("The Road"). However, this derivation is problematic as it is thought that no road of significance passed through the area before the name was already extant. Another suggested etymology is that the name is a hybrid of the unfamiliar English word "hill" and the Welsh definite article "yr" (Yr Hill, becoming Y Rhyl, and then just Rhyl in English). Although this is problematic as Rhyl is situated in a very flat area with no hills, it has been suggested that the original 'hill' was a piece of dry land relatively raised above the surrounding marshes (cors y rhyl). Another suggestion is that it could have referred to a now forgotten man-made structure, such as a motte outpost of Rhuddlan Castle guarding the mouth of the River Clwyd.

One etymology that gained popularity in the twentieth century suggests that the original dwelling of Ty'n Rhyl derived from Tŷ'n yr haul (House in the Sun/House of Sunshine). This may be an example of folk etymology, as Rhyl gained popularity as a summer destination for Welsh-speaking tourists and was advertised in English and Welsh as "Sunny Rhyl".

== Buildings, landmarks and attractions ==
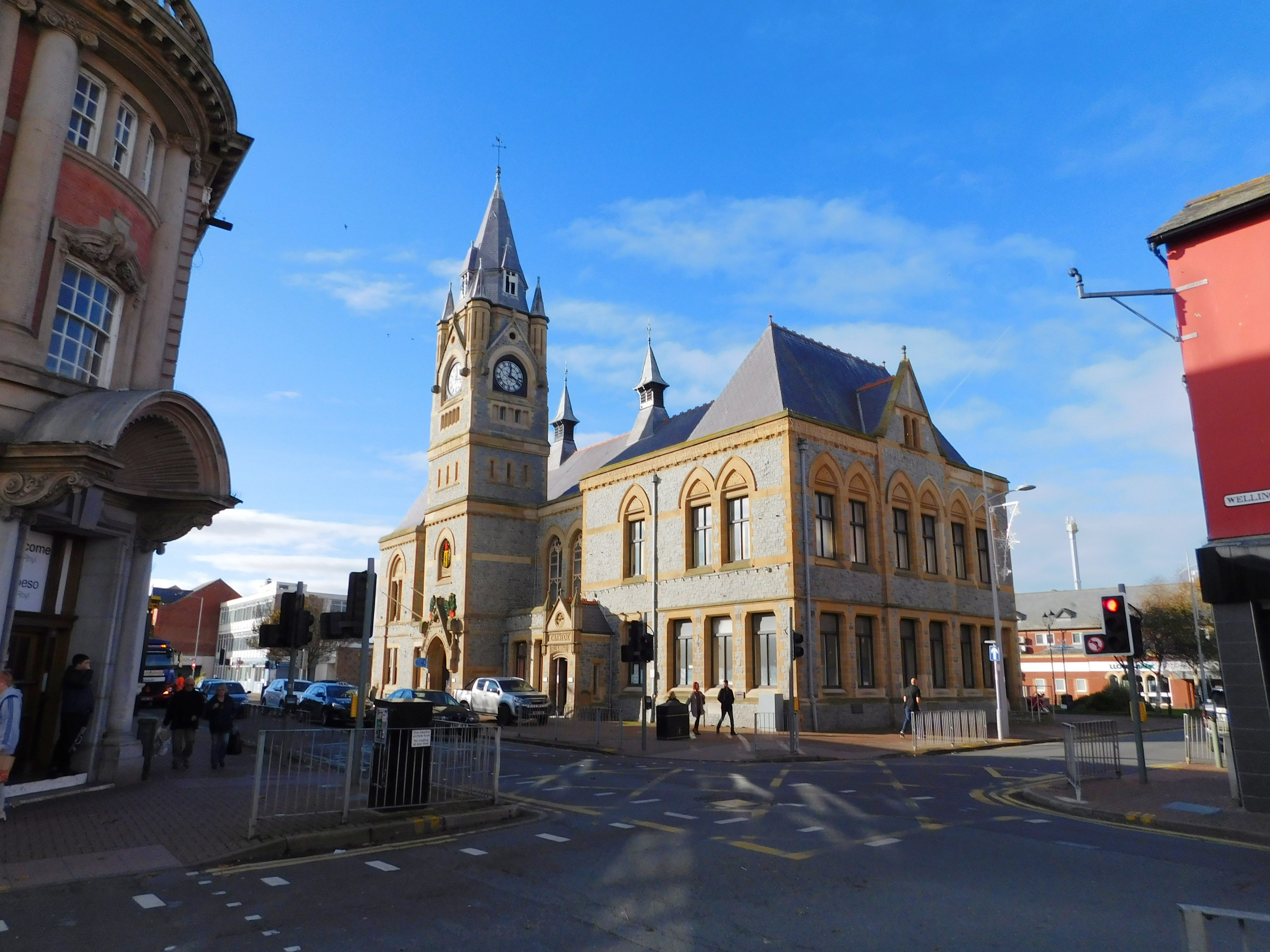
Rhyl Town Hall

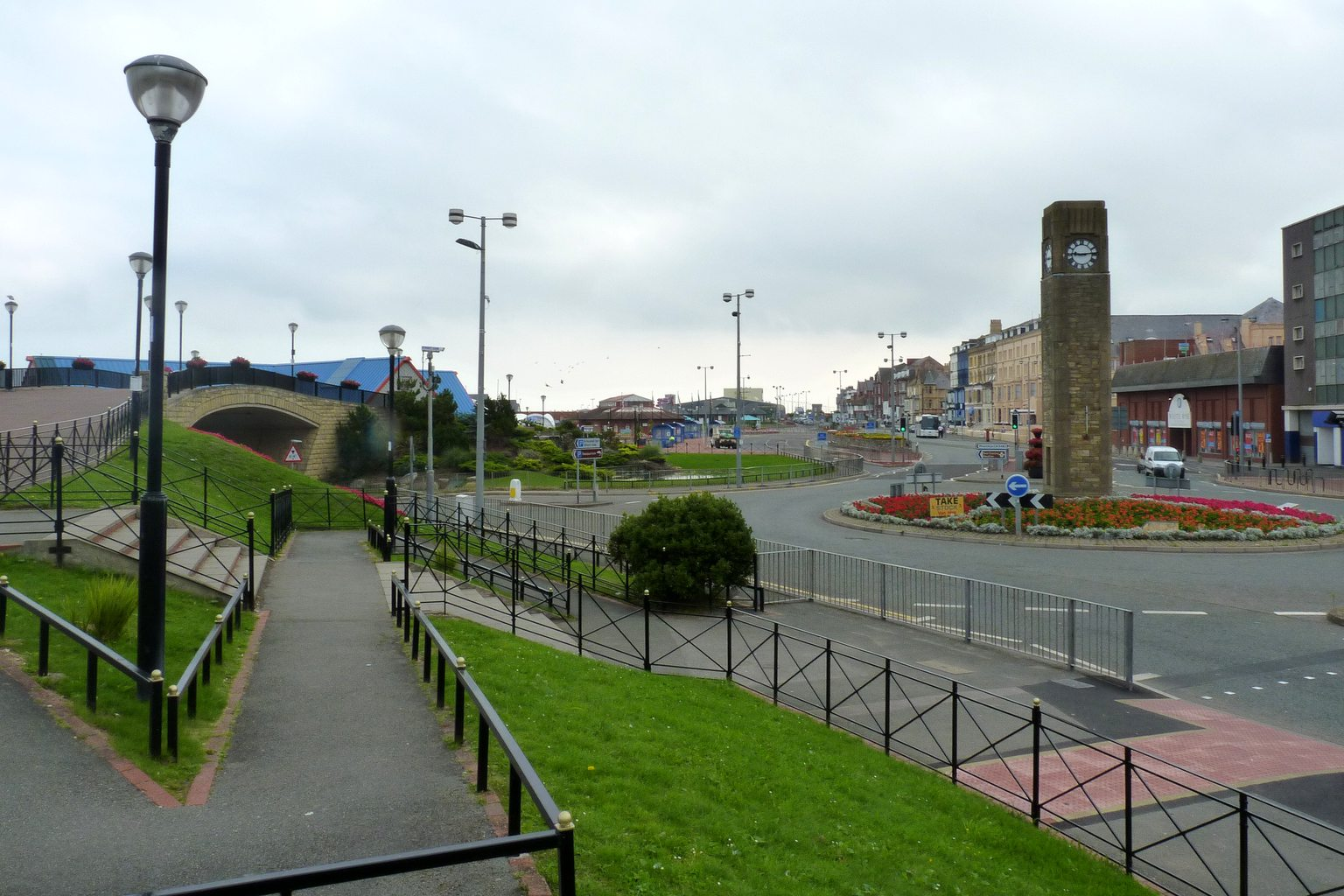
Rhyl clock tower and East Parade

Rhyl has a number of Grade II listed buildings and landmarks. These include the Parish Church of St Thomas in Bath Street, which is listed as Grade II*. Others are the Midland Bank building, the railway station along with two signal boxes and the public telephone box on the up platform, the Royal Alexandra Hospital, the Sussex Street Baptist Church, Rhyl Town Hall, the Swan public house in Russell Road, the war memorial, and the Welsh Presbyterian Church in Clwyd Street.

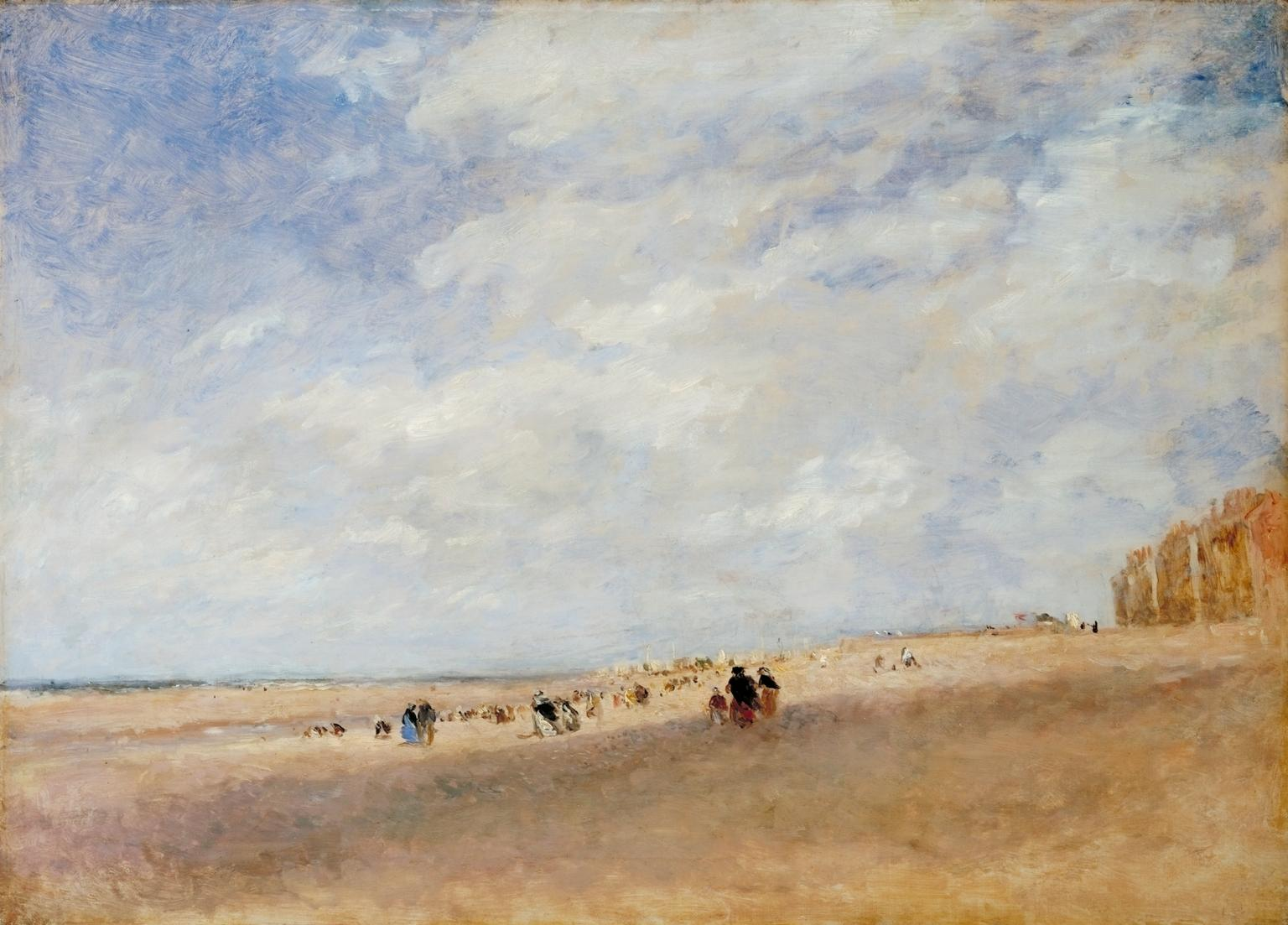
David Cox, Rhyl Sands (c.1854), depicting the Rhyl seafront

Also notable is the Grade II listed Foryd Harbour Bridge, a blue bridge with distinctive bowstring girders built in 1932. Situated over the River Clwyd, it links Rhyl with Kinmel Bay.

Another landmark is the Church of St Margaret of Antioch. The Marble Church was built by Lady Margaret in memory of her late husband, Sir Henry Peyto Willoughby de Broke. It was completed within four years and consecrated on 23 August 1860, becoming the parish church of a new parish of Bodelwyddan, covering an area formerly in that of St Asaph. The church opens daily from 9:30 to 16:30, except between 25 December and 6 January.

A previous Rhyl landmark was the ornate Pavilion Theatre with five domes, which was demolished in 1974. Half a mile further down the promenade stood Rhyl Pier, opened in 1867 at 2,355 feet (718 m) long. The structure was damaged by ships in 1883 and again in 1891. It was further damaged in 1901 by fire. Storms were responsible for further damage in 1909 in 1913 was closed as unsafe. Although it reopened with a much-reduced length in 1930, it closed again in 1966 and was demolished in 1973.

Rhyl's top attractions on the West Parade are Rhyl Children's Village theme park, and the 250-foot (76 m) Sky Tower (formerly the Clydesdale Bank tower, brought to Rhyl from the 1988 Glasgow Garden Festival). The Sky Tower opened in 1989, but it was closed to the public in 2010 and transformed into an illuminated beacon in 2017. A VUE Cinema that closed in January 2025 was also located there, although this cinema is being reopened under Merlin Cinemas.

Up until 2014, Rhyl Suncentre was an attraction on the East Parade; an indoor water leisure centre which opened in 1980 at a cost of £4.25 million and featured a heated swimming pool, water chutes and slides, and Europe's first indoor surfing pool. The local council closed the centre in early 2014 and it was demolished in 2016. A new Travelodge hotel was built next to the site, which opened in early 2019. A new indoor/outdoor water park, the SC2, opened further along the promenade in 2019, and includes various pools with water chutes and slides, as well as a separate "Ninja Tag" assault course game complex. Also on the East Parade is the New Pavilion Theatre, opened in 1991. It has over 1,000 seats and is managed by Denbighshire County Council. Redevelopment of the Pavilion theatre in 2017 provided for a new façade, entrance foyer and restaurant, and refurbished bar areas.

=== Marine Lake ===
The Marine Lake, an artificial excavation in the west of the town, used to be a tourist destination, with fairground rides and a zoo. The lake is a 12-hectare human-made reservoir and it was officially opened in 1895. Rhyl Miniature Railway is the only original attraction remaining on the site, a narrow gauge railway that travels around the lake and is now based at the new museum and railway centre. There is also a playground and numerous watersports clubs based around the lake.

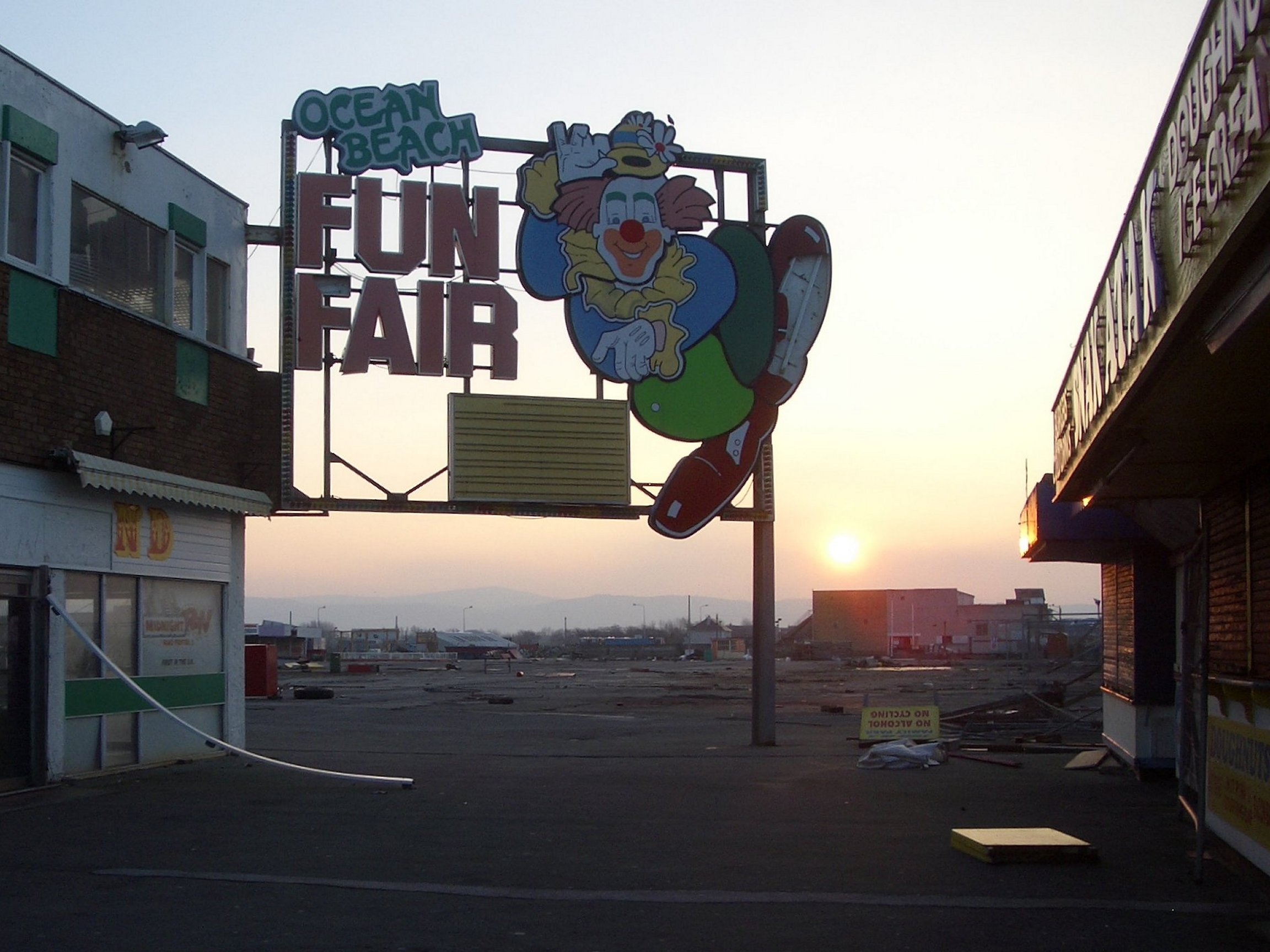
Former Ocean Beach Funfair site (December 2007)

The Marine Lake Funfair was demolished in the late 1960s, having been replaced by the nearby Ocean Beach Funfair. Ocean Beach finally closed on 2 September 2007 and was demolished to make way for a planned new development initially called Ocean Plaza. This was to include apartments, a hotel and various retail outlets. However, work on Ocean Plaza never went ahead as scheduled and the land lay vacant for several years after the original developers, Modus Properties, went bankrupt in 2009. The site was sold to a new company, Scarborough Development Group (SDG), in 2010, but again no work commenced on the site for several years. In 2014, SDG submitted revised plans to develop the land on a much smaller scale than the original plans. Now called Marina Quay, the plans no longer include the building of new apartments on the land as Natural Resources Wales' flood regulations now prohibit this. The plans were approved by the local authority in November 2014. In August 2015, The Range retail chain signed a 20-year lease and opened a new outlet on the site in March 2018. Aldi also opened a branch on the site in 2019.

== Governance ==
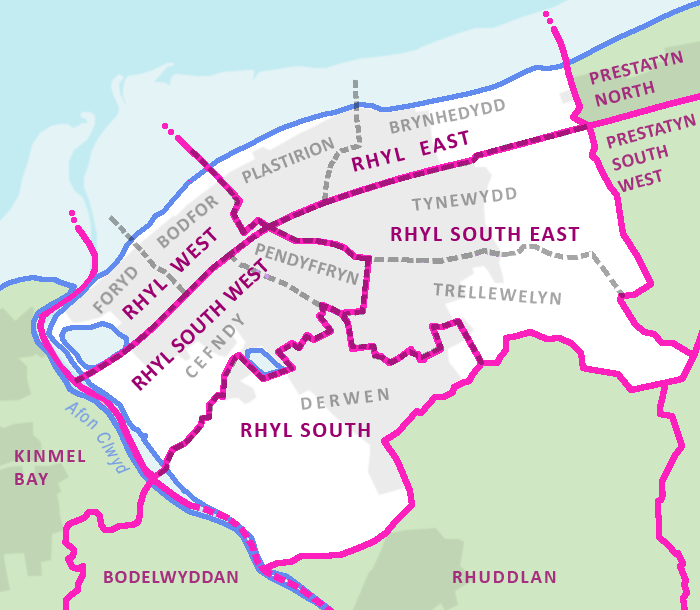
Electoral wards in and surrounding Rhyl (county=pink; town=grey)

For elections to Denbighshire County Council, Rhyl is divided into six electoral wards: Rhyl East, Rhyl South, Rhyl South West, Rhyl Trellewelyn, Rhyl Ty Newydd, and Rhyl West. After the 2022 local elections, eleven of Rhyl's county councillors belonged to the Welsh Labour Party and one to the Welsh Conservatives. In 2008 Rhyl West appeared as the most deprived ward in Wales in the Welsh Index of Multiple Deprivation.

The 22 councillors on Rhyl Town Council are divided among nine community wards: Bodfor, Brynhedydd, Cefndy, Derwen, Foryd, Pendyffryn, Plastirion, Trellewellyn, and Tynewydd.

== Sport ==
Association Football Rhyl F.C., commonly known as the Lilywhites, is a football club that played historically in English non-league football, but has competed since 1992 in the Welsh football pyramid. In the 2003–2004 season it won the Welsh Premier League, the Welsh Cup and the Welsh League Cup, and was losing finalist in the FAW Premier Cup. In the 2008–2009 season it again won the Welsh Premier League. On 17 May 2010, it was announced that Rhyl's Welsh Premier licence had been revoked. Its appeal was unsuccessful and it was relegated to the Cymru Alliance, returning to the Welsh Premier League in 2013 after winning the Cymru Alliance title, becoming the first club in the history of the competition to complete the season unbeaten. Rhyl has played in Europe on a few occasions. On 21 April 2020, the club announced it was going to cease trading and be formally wound up. In May 2020, a phoenix club was set up under the name of C.P.D. Y Rhyl 1879.

Rugby Union Rhyl and District RFC is the town's rugby union club. It completed a move from its old ground on the Waen in Rhuddlan, when a new ground and clubhouse opened at Tynewydd Fields in 2018.

Hockey Rhyl is home to the oldest field hockey club in Wales, formed in 1890. Its first international game was also played at Rhyl, between Ireland and Wales in 1895.

Professional Wrestling Veteran promoter Orig Williams, responsible for the Welsh language Reslo wrestling show on S4C, based his British Wrestling Federation in Rhyl and ran a wrestling training school in the town, the alumni of which included several television wrestlers including Robbie Brookside and Klondyke Kate.

== Transport ==
Rhyl railway station on the North Wales Coast Line is served by through trains of Avanti West Coast between Holyhead and London Euston, and by Transport for Wales Rail services: to Cardiff Central via Newport and Crewe, and to Manchester Piccadilly. Other stations nearby include Abergele & Pensarn, Prestatyn, Flint, Colwyn Bay and Llandudno Junction. The direct Transport for Wales and Avanti West Coast services to Holyhead give connections by Stena Line or Irish Ferries to Dublin Port.

Air travel is served by the nearest airport Liverpool John Lennon Airport which is approximately 52 km east of Rhyl.

The A548 road through the town links with the A55 Holyhead to Chester road at Abergele. The A525 road runs south from the town to Rhuddlan, St Asaph and Ruthin. Several Arriva Buses Wales bus services are run along the main coast road between Chester and Holyhead, linking the resorts. Another route runs between Rhyl and Denbigh.

== Education ==
The town has two secondary schools: Rhyl High School and Christ the Word Catholic School. Christ the Word teaches both primary and secondary school pupils and was opened in 2019 as a merger of Blessed Edward Jones Catholic School and its feeder Ysgol Mair. Both schools provide education to the age of 16, with sixth-form provision being available at Rhyl Sixth Form centre located in the Rhyl branch of Coleg Llandrillo.

In addition to the primary provision at Christ the Word Catholic School, there are five other dedicated primary schools in Rhyl: Christ Church Primary School, Ysgol Bryn Hedydd, Ysgol Emmanuel, Ysgol Llywelyn, and the Welsh-medium Ysgol Dewi Sant. There is also a special school in Rhyl called Ysgol Tir Morfa.

The first Welsh-medium secondary school in Wales started in Rhyl, as Ysgol Glan Clwyd was opened in the town in 1956 before moving to its present site at St Asaph in 1969.

== Media ==
Television signals are received from the Moel-y-Parc TV transmitter and the local relay transmitter situated in Prestatyn.

Local radio stations are BBC Radio Wales, BBC Radio Cymru, Capital North West and Wales, Capital Cymru, Heart North and Mid Wales. Local community radio stations include Drift Radio, Sound Radio and Rhyl Radio

The town is served by the local newspaper, Rhyl Journal which publishes on Wednesdays. North Wales Weekly News is another local newspaper which also covers the area.

== Notable people ==
=== Music ===
- Wayne Bickerton (1941–2015), record producer and musician
- Michael Leslie Peters (1959–2025), lead singer and founding member of The Alarm, a rock band formed in Rhyl in 1981, was born in Prestatyn, grew up in Rhyl and attended Rhyl High School.
- Lisa Scott-Lee (born 1975), singer and dancer founding member of Steps.

=== Politics ===
- Gareth Davies (born 1988), Welsh Conservative MS
- Isaac Jenks (1816–1888), ironmaster and Mayor of Wolverhampton, died at Rhyl.
- Ann Jones (born 1953), Welsh Labour and Co-operative Party MS
- Mungo Lewis (1894–1969), Manitoba politician
- Chris Ruane (born 1958), Welsh Labour MP

=== The arts ===
- Patrick Garnett (1932–2006), Swinging Sixties architect
- Nathan Penlington (living), poet and magician

=== Scholarship and literature ===
- Thomas Aubrey (1808–1867), Methodist minister of religion and preacher
- Bob Griffiths (born 1953), born in Rhyl, Church in Wales priest, British Armed Forces chaplain, then Archdeacon of Wrexham
- Edward Ross Wharton (1844–1896), classical scholar, etymologist and lexicographer
- Vernon R. Young (1937–2004), research scientist specializing in protein and amino acid requirements

=== Sport ===
- James Chester (born 1989), international footballer (Aston Villa F.C.)
- Ched Evans (born 1988), international footballer (Sheffield United F.C.)
- David Harrison (born 1972), jockey, winner of 1992 Royal Hunt Cup at Royal Ascot, grew up in Rhyl and attended Blessed Edward Jones Catholic High School.
- Elliott Hewitt (born 1994), professional footballer (Notts County F.C.)
- Don Oakes (1928–1977), professional footballer (Arsenal F.C.)
- William Roberts (born 1863, fl. 1880s – 1890s), international footballer

=== Stage and broadcasting ===
- Alexa Davies (born 1995), actress best known for Young Rosie in Mamma Mia! Here We Go Again
- Ruth Ellis (1926–1955), nightclub hostess and murderer, was the last woman hanged in the UK.
- Nerys Hughes (born 1941), actress
- Sara Sugarman (born 1962), actress and film director
- Carol Vorderman (born 1960), TV broadcaster and game-show host, attended Blessed Edward Jones Catholic High School.

== Climate ==
The climate is cool and temperate in Rhyl. The climate here is classified as Cfb by the Köppen climate classification. The average temperature in Rhyl is 10.4 °C (50.7 °F). Annual precipitation averages 828 mm (32.6 in).

Climate data for Rhyl (1991–2020 normals, extremes 1911-present)
| Month | Jan | Feb | Mar | Apr | May | Jun | Jul | Aug | Sep | Oct | Nov | Dec | Year |
|---|---|---|---|---|---|---|---|---|---|---|---|---|---|
| Record high °C (°F) | 17.7 (63.9) | 20.1 (68.2) | 23.3 (73.9) | 24.1 (75.4) | 27.1 (80.8) | 33.0 (91.4) | 34.3 (93.7) | 32.0 (89.6) | 28.5 (83.3) | 25.6 (78.1) | 20.0 (68.0) | 16.3 (61.3) | 34.3 (93.7) |
| Mean daily maximum °C (°F) | 8.1 (46.6) | 8.4 (47.1) | 10.1 (50.2) | 12.6 (54.7) | 15.6 (60.1) | 18.2 (64.8) | 19.8 (67.6) | 19.5 (67.1) | 17.5 (63.5) | 14.2 (57.6) | 10.8 (51.4) | 8.6 (47.5) | 13.6 (56.5) |
| Daily mean °C (°F) | 5.5 (41.9) | 5.6 (42.1) | 7.0 (44.6) | 9.0 (48.2) | 11.7 (53.1) | 14.3 (57.7) | 16.2 (61.2) | 16.0 (60.8) | 14.0 (57.2) | 11.1 (52.0) | 8.1 (46.6) | 5.9 (42.6) | 10.4 (50.7) |
| Mean daily minimum °C (°F) | 2.9 (37.2) | 2.9 (37.2) | 3.9 (39.0) | 5.3 (41.5) | 7.7 (45.9) | 10.5 (50.9) | 12.5 (54.5) | 12.4 (54.3) | 10.6 (51.1) | 8.1 (46.6) | 5.4 (41.7) | 3.3 (37.9) | 7.1 (44.8) |
| Record low °C (°F) | −11.7 (10.9) | −12.2 (10.0) | −10.6 (12.9) | −6.7 (19.9) | −0.8 (30.6) | 2.2 (36.0) | 4.4 (39.9) | 3.9 (39.0) | 1.1 (34.0) | −5.6 (21.9) | −7.9 (17.8) | −13.7 (7.3) | −13.7 (7.3) |
| Average precipitation mm (inches) | 74.2 (2.92) | 61.7 (2.43) | 52.2 (2.06) | 49.1 (1.93) | 52.2 (2.06) | 60.3 (2.37) | 63.0 (2.48) | 68.9 (2.71) | 72.9 (2.87) | 89.3 (3.52) | 88.2 (3.47) | 96.6 (3.80) | 828.5 (32.62) |
| Average precipitation days (≥ 1.0 mm) | 14.5 | 11.8 | 11.1 | 10.3 | 9.8 | 9.6 | 11.2 | 11.8 | 11.1 | 13.6 | 16.0 | 16.2 | 146.9 |
Source 1: Met Office
Source 2: Starlings Roost Weather
