= Caryl Parry Jones =

Welsh singer and actress (born 1958)

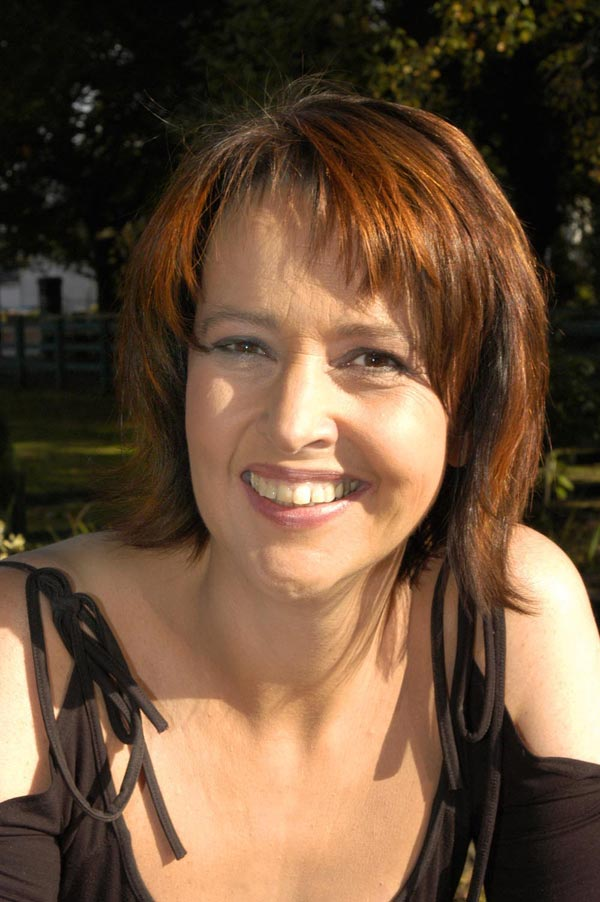

Background information
- Born: 16 April 1958 (age 67); Ffynnongroyw, Wales
- Genres: Welsh music
- Occupations: Singer, songwriter, presenter, actress, producer
- Years active: 1970s–present

Caryl Parry Jones (born 16 April 1958) is a Welsh singer, actress and presenter. She was born in the Flintshire village of Ffynnongroyw and attended Ysgol Glan Clwyd in St. Asaph, but now lives in Cowbridge, in the Vale of Glamorgan.

== Career ==
Parry Jones started her career as a singer in the vocal group Sidan (Silk) and was an accomplished pianist, playing for artists such as Dafydd Iwan, the founder of the Welsh music label Sain. In 1976, she became a singer with the short-lived Injaroc, an eight-piece rock band which included Geraint Griffiths, Endaf Emlyn, Sioned Mair and Cleif Harpwood. The group split after just nine months and one album, Halen y Ddaear (Salt of the Earth).

In 1979, she formed Bando with musicians Rhys Ifans, Gareth Thomas, Huw Owen, Martin Sage and Steve Sardar. Bando went onto produce two albums Yr Hwyl Ar Y Mastiau (Fun on the Masts) and Shampw (Shampoo) – both with a disco theme – before separating in 1982. The making of Shampw was the subject of an award-winning S4C special, which was later screened across the rest of the UK on Channel 4.

Parry Jones launched a solo musical career in 1983, producing an album called Caryl a'r Band alongside Myfyr Issac, as well as performing in another band, Y Milioners (The Millionaires). Later album releases included Eiliad in 1996, Adre in 2004 and a greatest hits compilation, Goreuon Caryl in 2006.

While performing with Bando, she moved into broadcasting, presenting children's programmes in Welsh such as Bilidowcar (BBC Cymru) and HTV's pop magazine show Sêr (later Sêren 2). As an actress, she appeared in TV films such as Gaucho (1983), The Mimosa Boys (1983), Ibiza, Ibiza (1986) and Steddfod, Steddfod (1989) – the latter two inspired a number of comedy and variety series for S4C and HTV Wales, including Caryl (1983–87), TV Teifi (1991) and Caryl a'r Lleill (2014–15).

From 2010 to 2014, Parry Jones co-presented a daily morning show on BBC Radio Cymru with Dafydd Meredydd (alias Dafydd Du).

Dafydd a Caryl was revived in February 2018 as the breakfast show for the BBC's new Welsh language radio network, Radio Cymru 2 on Monday – Thursday mornings. As of 2016, she is also a regular cover presenter for BBC Radio Wales, generally for daytime programming.

In 2016 and 2017, Parry Jones co-wrote and starred in two series of the S4C comedy drama Anita with her cousin, Non Parry. The cast also included Bryn Fôn, Rhodri Meilir and her daughter Miriam Isaac. It was not commissioned for a third series due to low ratings.

In August 2018, an episode of the series Adre was spent at Parry Jones' house.

In October 2022, she replaced Geraint Lloyd as the presenter of BBC Radio Cymru's late show on Monday - Thursday nights from 9pm - midnight.

== Personal life ==
Parry Jones has four children with her husband, musician Myfyr Isaac, and a step-son. Her father was musician Rhys Jones.
