= Thomas Aubrey (Methodist minister) =

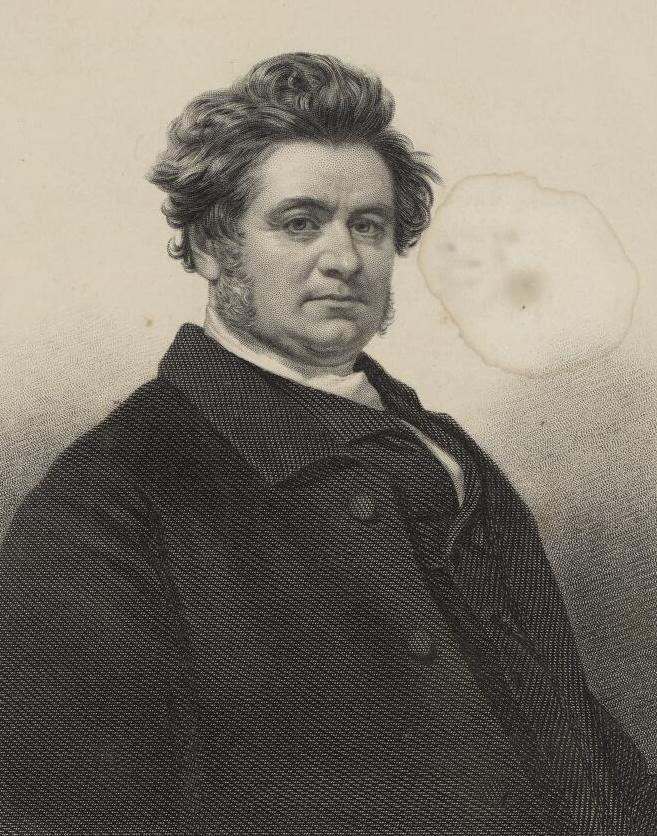
Portrait of Thomas Aubrey

Thomas Aubrey (1808–1867) was a Welsh Wesleyan Methodist minister.

== Early life ==
Aubrey was born at Cefn-coed-y-cymmer on 13 May 1808. His parents were Thomas and Anne Aubrey. He was schooled by an elder on Arminianism within the context of the Wesleyan faith. At about the age of 14 he had a religious conversion. By the age of 15, he was preaching and became a Wesleyan Methodist minister by 1826 and was ordained a full-time minister in 1830. He married Elizabeth Williams of Ruthin on 6 April 1831.

== Career ==
For 39 years beginning in 1826, he preached in London, Liverpool, on circuits in North Wales, and in Merthyr Tydfil. He chaired the North Wales district meeting for eleven years beginning in 1854. Within four years, he had become the superintendent minister of the Bangor circuit, where he ran a series of successful revival meetings and sparked a revival movement in Wales. In 1865, he became a supernumerary.

He was taken up by the wonderful spirit which permeated the lectures [of Charles Grandison Finney], as the one thing the churches of the age needed… He implored others to accept them, and he impressed the practical suggestions upon the churches.

—Samuel Davies, Cofiant y Parch Thomas Aubrey (The Rev. Thomas Aubrey memoir)

According to his biographer, Albert Hughes Williams, he was "one of the outstanding figures in Welsh Wesleyan Methodist history", excelling as an administrator and an orator. He was instrumental in the creation of the North Wales District Chapel Fund and the home mission fund. He established revival meetings, circuit manses, and meetings within churches to discuss their spiritual condition.

He died 16 November 1867 at Rhyl.
