= Wedi 7 =

- Genre: News magazine
- Presented by: Angharad Mair; Branwen Gwyn; John Hardy
- Country of origin: United Kingdom
- Original language: Welsh

Production
- Running time: 30 minutes (including advertisements)
- Production company: Tinopolis

Original release
- Network: S4C
- Release: 7 January 2002 – March 2012

Related
- Wedi 3

Wedi 7 (Welsh for 'After 7') is a nightly Welsh language television magazine programme, formerly broadcast by S4C. Produced by Tinopolis, it was the half-hour sister programme to a full-hour Wedi 3 (Welsh for 'After 3').

== Description ==
The Welsh-language television programme was first broadcast on 7 January 2002 with Angharad Mair presenting and Catrin Evans interviewing the politician Rod Richards and Gwyn Llywelyn questioning the Chief constable of North Wales Police at the time, Richard Brunstrom, in his first Welsh interview. It was presented by the programme's editor, Angharad Mair, and included Wales' news including leisure, entertainment and all the local events. She was joined by studio guests ranging from well-known celebrities to the up-and-coming stars of tomorrow and those with a story to tell. A team of correspondents based in Llanelli and Caernarfon reported live into the programme every night.

Wedi7 was replaced by a revived version of Heno (Welsh for 'Tonight'), a similar Tinopolis-produced evening magazine programme, on 1 March 2012.
