= Cymuned =

Welsh community pressure group

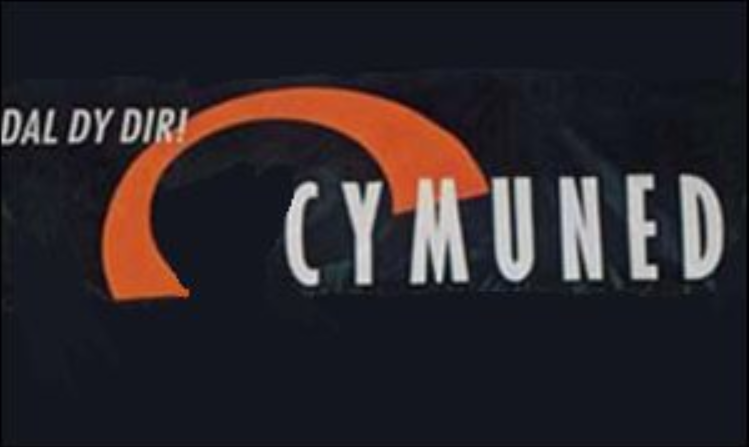
- President: Aran Jones
- Founder: Seimon Glyn; Simon Brooks; Twm Morys
- Founded: 11 July 2001
- Membership (2004): c.1,800
- Ideology: Welsh nationalism Anti-English sentiment (alleged)
- Slogan: Dal dy dir ('Hold your ground')

Website
- cymuned.net

Cymuned (translated in English as "community", Welsh pronunciation: [kəˈmɨnɛd]) was a Welsh communities direct action pressure group. The group was established on 11 July 2001 at a conference held at Mynytho Memorial Hall, hosted by Simon Brooks and Twm Morys, along with Plaid Cymru Gwynedd councillor Seimon Glyn. It campaigned on behalf of local communities in Wales, particularly (but not exclusively) Welsh-speaking and rural ones, which it perceived to be under threat due to demographic change. The organisation has been characterised as Welsh nationalist, and critics have accused its rhetoric as being anti-English in nature, although this has been disputed.

== History ==
=== Origins ===
In January 2001, Seimon Glyn was disciplined by Plaid Cymru following comments on a BBC Wales radio programme in which he called for what he described as a “tidal wave” of English immigration into Wales to be stemmed and referred to English retirees as a “drain on resources”. Glyn further stated that he believed the number of English immigrants should be closely monitored, and that newcomers should be required to learn Welsh. The controversy surrounding Glyn’s comments was later raised during a parliamentary debate on racism on 7 May 2002, when the Labour Member of Parliament (MP) for Blaenau Gwent, Llew Smith, called on Plaid Cymru leader Ieuan Wyn Jones to expel those responsible from the party. Glyn did not retract his comments and criticised Ieuan Wyn Jones, describing him as a “coward” for failing to address immigration. On 17 February 2001, Glyn addressed a rally in Caernarfon in which he stated that he had no regrets. During the dispute, Gwilym ab Ioan, a member of Plaid Cymru’s National Executive, resigned after it emerged that he had posted online that Wales was becoming a “dumping ground for England’s oddballs and misfits”.

First Minister of Wales Rhodri Morgan issued a firm condemnation when former chairman of the Welsh Language Board, John Elfed Jones, interjected by publishing an article in Barn reportedly likening immigration into Wales as a "human form of foot-and-mouth disease". T. Robin Chapman later stated that Jones’ choice of words was “deeply regrettable”; however, he argued that the controversy arose from a mistranslation. According to Chapman, Jones had originally used the Welsh words for “feet” (traed) and “mouths” (genau) to suggest that those who “walk into” (troedio i mewn) Welsh-speaking communities influence what comes out of people’s mouths, meaning the language they speak. Clwy’r traed a’r genau translates to "foot-and-mouth disease" in Welsh, a connection that contributed to the controversy surrounding Jones’s remarks and their subsequent interpretation.

In September 2001, North Wales Live reported that Seimon Glyn had been cleared of an offence under the Public Order Act 1986 relating to an alleged intention to incite racial hatred. The Chief Constable of North Wales Police, Richard Brunstrom, stated: “I have come to the conclusion there is no evidence you intended to create racial hatred, and therefore I have decided that the police will not be taking any further action at this stage.” Brunstrom later addressed a Cymuned conference in Penrhyndeudraeth in April 2007, during which he called on the Welsh Government to update the Welsh Language Act 1993, drawing criticism from the Labour Party.

Cymuned emerged from the controversy and was formally established at a well-attended public meeting in July 2001 held at Mynytho Memorial Hall on the Llŷn Peninsula, where debates over second homes and the Welsh language were particularly prominent. The movement’s adopted slogan, dal dy dir (lit. 'hold your ground'), appeared frequently as graffiti across the region at the time. At the National Eisteddfod in Denbigh in August, Cymuned held a joint protest with Cymdeithas yr Iaith Gymraeg (Welsh Language Society), during which demonstrators called for a new Welsh Language Act and a Property Act. Reports stated that up to 200 people took part in the protest, marching around the Eisteddfod field with a bed to demand that Welsh politicians “wake up”, before proceeding to the Welsh Assembly pavilion and depositing stolen estate agent signs there. The group also published a collection of letters expressing support for Seimon Glyn’s comments earlier in the year at the event.

In June 2003, the Welsh Conservative Assembly Member (AM) for Mid and West Wales, Glyn Davies, spoke at a Cymuned conference in Glantwymyn, in which he voiced support for the movement's efforts to preserve the Welsh language. Seimon Glyn welcomed Davies’ attendance at the event, stating that Glyn Davies had shown “more backbone than Plaid Cymru AMs” whom he accused of raising such issues privately rather than engaging directly with their constituents. At the same conference, Glyn suggested that Cymuned was considering standing candidates for local authority elections. Following the unsuccessful attempt of Llais Ceredigion (lit. 'voice of Ceredigion') to win a mayoral election, founding member Simon Brooks, a former editor of the Welsh-language magazine Barn, resigned from Cymuned in July 2004, stating that he felt “burned out.”

=== Campaigns ===
==== Language ====
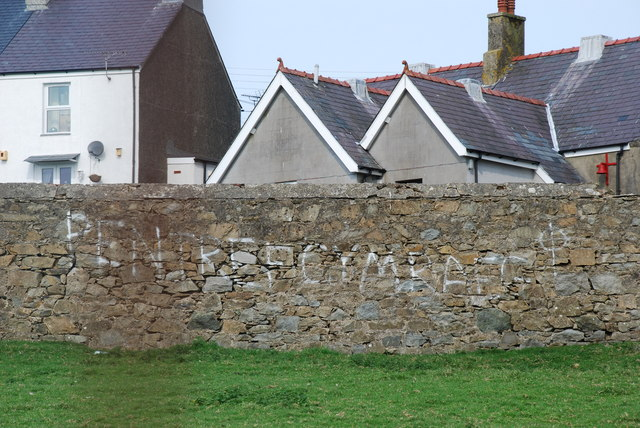
Welsh-language graffiti reading "Pentref Cymraeg" ('Welsh-speaking village') in Llithfaen, 28 April 2007

The organisation gained wider public attention through highly visible protest actions. On 25 September 2004, Cymuned staged a joint protest with the Welsh republican organisation Mudiad Rhyddhad Cymru (lit. 'movement for the freedom of Wales'), during which activists blocked the A44 into Aberystwyth with caravans and cars. Activists also chained themselves to the vehicles. Aran Jones, chief executive of Cymuned from 2004, described the protest as “successful,” adding that it was intended to highlight the issue of students at Aberystwyth University settling in the area while choosing not to integrate into the local community. A promotional video featuring the protest was published by the organisation on YouTube, and showed angry motorists as demonstrators blocked the road with vehicles bearing the banners of Owain Glyndŵr and the Free Wales Army (FWA).

In 2007, Cymuned protested against the Welsh train company Arriva Trains Wales for the lack of use of the Welsh language on its services, and the holiday agents Thomas Cook for banning the use of Welsh in its Bangor branch.

==== Housing ====
Critics argued that estate agents were providing a commercial service to the Welsh people who contracted them to sell or rent their property in return for market value and that the sharp rise in the cost of property in recent years was not confined to Wales but an international phenomenon of the growing world economy; however, Cymuned argued that there was a need to create a secondary sustainable local housing market in rural Wales. A new campaign designed to ensure that a sustainable proportion of new homes should be for locals only is based on planning policy that had already been adopted in the Yorkshire Dales National Park, as well as parts of Shropshire, Devon, the Peak District and the Lake District.

In December 2006, the group released a video showing a staged Christmas carolling protest in the coastal village of Abersoch, an area known for its high concentration of second homes, intended to draw attention to the number of vacant properties.

In 2013, the organisation campaigned on behalf of the Rhostyllen community near Wrexham against plans by the National Trust to develop land next to the village for high-priced housing.

=== Controversy ===
In April 2013, Aran Jones reportedly received death threats in connection with his involvement in Cymuned, consisting of an anonymous letter stating “Make peace with your God while you can” and threatening to “fight fire with fire.”

== Notable members ==
- Aran Jones, who learned Welsh as a second language, and later founded SaySomethingInWelsh to help others learn.
- Carrie Harper, who later became a Plaid Cymru Member of the Senedd (MS) for Fflint Wrecsam constituency.
- Jerry Hunter, an American Harvard graduate who moved to Wales to learn Welsh and has remained in Wales ever since, working in academic posts at the University of Wales and Bangor University.
- Judith Humphreys, a Welsh actress and partner of Jerry Hunter.
- Twm Morys, poet and musician who won the chair at the 2003 National Eisteddfod.
