= Simon Brooks =

British journalist

Simon Brooks (born 1971) is a Welsh academic and writer. Brooks was born in Hounslow, London to Welsh parents, he was raised in a bilingual household and active in the London Welsh community as a teenager. He studied Welsh at the University College of Wales, Aberystwyth and Celtic Studies at Jesus College, Oxford University.

== Academia and government adviser ==
Brooks is currently an Associate Professor in the School of Management at Swansea University, an interdisciplinary scholar specialising in history, the history of ideas, multiculturalism, political theory and public policy. He is also a member of the University's Morgan Academy.

Brooks has also been appointed as an advisor to the Welsh government as a member of the Welsh Language Partnership Council, for which he published the report 'Second homes: Developing new policies in Wales' in 2021. Recommendations underpinned government policy in the area.

In 2020, he chaired the government committee established to review the impact of the COVID-19 pandemic in Wales on Welsh-speaking community groups. Once again, the Committee recommendations underpin government policy.

In 2022, he was appointed Chair of the Commission for Welsh-speaking communities making recommendations to the Welsh Government on the future of Welsh as a community language.

== Author ==
Brooks is an independent author and is a former editor of the Welsh language current affairs magazine Barn (1996–2007), and between 1993 and 1996 was a founding co-editor of the Welsh language cultural magazine Tu Chwith. A collection of his journalism in Barn was published in 2009. Brooks is the General Editor of Dawn Dweud, the University of Wales Press series of intellectual biographies.

His book Pam Na Fu Cymru (2015; English version: Why Wales Never Was) was shortlisted for Wales Book of the Year award in the non-fiction category. The English edition was published in 2017. Jerry Hunter, Professor in the School of Welsh and Deputy Vice Chancellor at Bangor University, said of Why Wales Never Was, "This is a multi-layered study that tackles core questions about nationality, language and identity. It talks about the past with a view to the present and the future, in a challenging and exciting way."

In 2005 O Dan Lygaid y Gestapo (Beneath the eyes of the Gestapo) was also shortlisted for the Wales Book of the Year award.

As a cultural historian, Brooks has published three monographs with the University of Wales Press. O Dan Lygaid y Gestapo (University of Wales Press; 2014) explored the influence of Enlightenment thought within 20th century Welsh-language culture. Pam na fu Cymru (University of Wales Press; 2015) proposed that the historical failure of Welsh nationalism was due to its dependence on a form of British liberalism which promoted Anglophone majoritarianism. Hanes Cymry (University of Wales Press;2021), the first history of ethnic diversity within Welsh-language culture, argued that the Welsh-language community has always been multi-ethnic.

In 2018, he published Adra, an autoethnographical account of a year supporting Porthmadog Football Club. Brooks was Chair of Porthmadog Town Council at the time, and the book has been described an account of life in a 'left behind' small town.

A travelogue exploring Welsh-speaking communities in England, Lloegr Gymraeg ('Welsh England') is to be published in 2027.

== Language and politics ==
He is also a founding member of the Welsh language pressure group Cymuned, for whom he was a prominent media spokesman between 2001 and 2004, and whose central office he ran. In 2012 he was also one of the founders of Dyfodol i'r Iaith, a 'constitutional' lobbying group for the Welsh language, whose aim is 'to influence the public policy and legislation to "promote and nurture" the language.'

Brooks belongs to a family that supports the Labour Party but is himself a Welsh Nationalist.

== Bibliography ==
Academic

- O Dan Lygaid y Gestapo: Yr Oleuedigaeth Gymraeg a Theori Lenyddol yng Nghymru (Beneath the eyes of the Gestapo: The Welsh Enlightenment and Literature Theory in Wales) - University of Wales Press 2004
- Pa beth yr aethoch allan i'w achub? - Gwasg Carreg y Gwalch 2013
- Pam Na Fu Cymru: Methiant Cenedlaetholdeb Cymraeg - University of Wales Press 2015. Published in English as Why Wales never was in 2017
- Hanes Cymry - Lleiafrifoedd Ethnig yn y Gwareiddiad Cymraeg (A History of the Welsh - Ethnic Minorities in Welsh-language Civilization) - University of Wales Press 2020.

Journalism

- Llythyrau at Seimon Glyn (ed.) - Y Lolfa 2001
- Yr Hawl i Oroesi (The Right to Exist) - Gwasg Carreg Gwalch 2009

Public Policy

- Second Homes: Developing New Policies in Wales – Welsh Government, 2021
- Empowering communities: strengthening the Welsh language (lead author) – The Commission for Welsh-speaking communities, 2024

Travelogue

- Lloegr Gymraeg: Taith trwy Gymunedau Cymraeg Lloegr (Welsh England: A Journey through the Welsh-speaking communities of England) – Y Lolfa 2027

Autoethnography

- Adra - Y Lolfa 2018
