= Colin Skinner =

British author, adventurer, and biologist

Colin Skinner holding a year old kiwi

Colin Skinner (born 1965) is a British author, adventurer and molecular biologist who is attempting to walk around the world. As of mid-2014, he has walked over 14,500 miles (23,300 km) and has crossed Great Britain, Iceland, United States and New Zealand. He has used the walks to raise money and awareness for various causes, including conservation biology, people with disabilities, cancer relief, AIDS, and hospice.

== Education ==
Skinner earned his Bachelor of Science (BSc) combined honours degree in biochemistry and genetics from the University of Leeds. He earned his PhD in molecular biology from University College London. He earned his Postgraduate Certificate in Education (PGCE) in secondary science from Canterbury Christ Church University.

== Walking around the world ==
=== Scotland to England in 1984 ===
He began at the age of 18 at John o' Groats (at the northern tip of Scotland) in 1984, and walked to Land's End in England. On this journey, which he carried out with three other people, he pushed a wheelchair 1,000 miles (1,600 km) and raised £3,500 for The Forelands School for handicapped children. In 1983, he had already run 21 miles (34 km) around a 400-metre track to raise further money for The Forelands School for handicapped children, at Broadstairs in Kent.

=== Iceland in 1986 ===
In 1986, at the age of 20, whilst at the University of Leeds, he crossed Iceland, together with three other students (Andrew Backhouse, David Brock and Shaun Fagan), from Seyðisfjörður in the east, through the interior to the north of the Vatnajökull ice fields, and then west to Reykjavík. The team encountered an 'ash storm', where storm force winds had whipped up fine black volcanic ash, and had to wear goggles and face masks to push on into the winds. In the rain shadow of the Vatnajökull, they ran out of water, then encountered a flash flood, as mud rushed down from the melting glaciers. They also had to survive on food contaminated with petrol that had leaked from their petrol stoves. This journey of 400 miles (640 km) raised £2,000 for the Royal Association for Disability and Rehabilitation. As part of the training for the walk across Iceland he ran the Leeds Marathon, in a time of 3 hours and 41 minutes.

On the Icelandic trek, he came up with the idea of walking 6,000 miles (9,700 km), across Britain and America to raise money for Macmillan Cancer Support in Britain and hospice in America and Canada.

=== Scotland to England in 1988 ===
On 1 May 1988, he set off again from John o' Groats, this time walking through the West Highlands, down the Pennine Way and then south to Land's End: a distance of 1,100 miles (1,800 km) in seven weeks. As part of the training for this walk he ran the gruelling Snowdonia Marathon, in a time of 4 hours and 40 minutes. The walk through Scotland and England raised £2,000 for Macmillan Cancer Support.

=== Across the U.S.A. in 1988/1989 ===
Colin Skinner walking by the Teton Mountains

The journey across the United States began on 15 July 1988. On the journey he slept in bushes beneath the World Trade Center, camped outside Kennedy Airport in a tent, then headed west. On Staten Island he collapsed from heat exhaustion at 105 degrees Fahrenheit. In Utah the temperatures went down to minus 30 Fahrenheit. Carrying a tent and a backpack, with no backup, he walked alone to Niagara Falls, through Ontario in Canada, to Detroit, between the Great Lakes, across the Great Plains, through the Rockies in winter, to Yellowstone National Park, then south to the Grand Canyon, on to Las Vegas, through Death Valley and then snowshoed over the Sierras to reach San Francisco. In Death Valley, down to his last $13, Skinner found $200 in the desert, and he had $1 left when he crossed the Sierras to reach Yosemite Valley. The total distance he walked from New York City to San Francisco, was 4,952 miles (7,969 km).

On the journey he visited 70 hospices and appeared on television, radio and in newspapers to encourage support for hospices across the U.S. and Canada. The mayor of San Francisco, Art Agnos, proclaimed 21 March 1989, "Colin Skinner Day," in recognition of the attention he brought to the work of hospices with AIDS patients in the city.

Returning to Britain after this walk, he obtained a job as a research assistant in Chemical Pathology at the Middlesex Hospital and went on to obtain a PhD in Molecular Biology at University College London. In 1992, whilst studying for his PhD, he also ran the London Marathon, in a time of 4 hours and 41 minutes, to raise money to buy a computer for a young boy with physical disabilities. Skinner's PhD involved developing genetic tests to detect congenital adrenal hyperplasia in children. He had work published in a number of scientific journals. In 1994 he had his work published in Human Molecular Genetics.

In 1994, Skinner married Dr. Monica Schneider (also a molecular biologist), and in 1996 their son James was born. From 1994 to 1996 Skinner worked as a Post-Doctoral Research Fellow at Vanderbilt University Medical Center, in Nashville, Tennessee. The work he carried out there involved gene sequencing and protein purification of cytochrome P450 enzymes. His work was published in the Journal of Biological Chemistry. From 1996 to 1997 Skinner took care of his infant son, James, whilst his wife continued to work at Vanderbilt University Medical Center.

=== New Zealand in 1998 ===
In 1998 he walked from Cape Reinga in the North Island, to Bluff, at the southern tip of New Zealand; a distance of 1,500 miles (2,400 km). On the journey he walked through the active volcano at White Island, experienced earthquakes up to 4.9 on the Richter Scale, clambered over glaciers, swam with seals and reported on conservation biology projects involving endangered species. Information from the journey was posted on the Internet for schoolchildren in the U.S. via the Scholastic Corporation Scholastic Network. In December 2010 Skinner completed a book about the journey and conservation biology, New Zealand – 1500 miles on foot through – The Land of the Long White Cloud on an Internet website.

In 1999 he obtained a PGCE (Postgraduate Certificate in Education) from Canterbury Christ Church University in Canterbury, England. In 2000 he worked as a secondary school science teacher at St. Edmund's School in Dover, teaching 11 to 16-year-olds.

In 2001 he worked as a volunteer at a wildlife park, working on enrichment activities for animals. From 2001 until 2003 he worked part-time at a post office. During this time, he also taught science to primary school children, in a 'Link-Scientist' scheme run by the pharmaceutical company Pfizer, and took care of his son.

In 2003 his mother died from pancreatic cancer, at the age of 59. This prompted him to write the story of the 6,000 miles (9,700 km) journey across Britain and America. In 2006 he finished the book Beyond the Setting Sun, with an introduction by Ranulph Fiennes, the renowned polar explorer and adventurer. The book was written to raise money for hospices in Britain, Canada and America.

=== Scotland to England in 2007 ===
On 29 April 2007, he began walking again at John o' Groats and arrived at Land's End on 8 June, having covered 900 miles (1,400 km) in 6 weeks. On the walk in Britain he visited 20 hospices and raised £10,000 for hospice through sales of his Beyond the Setting Sun book.

=== U.S.A. in 2009 ===
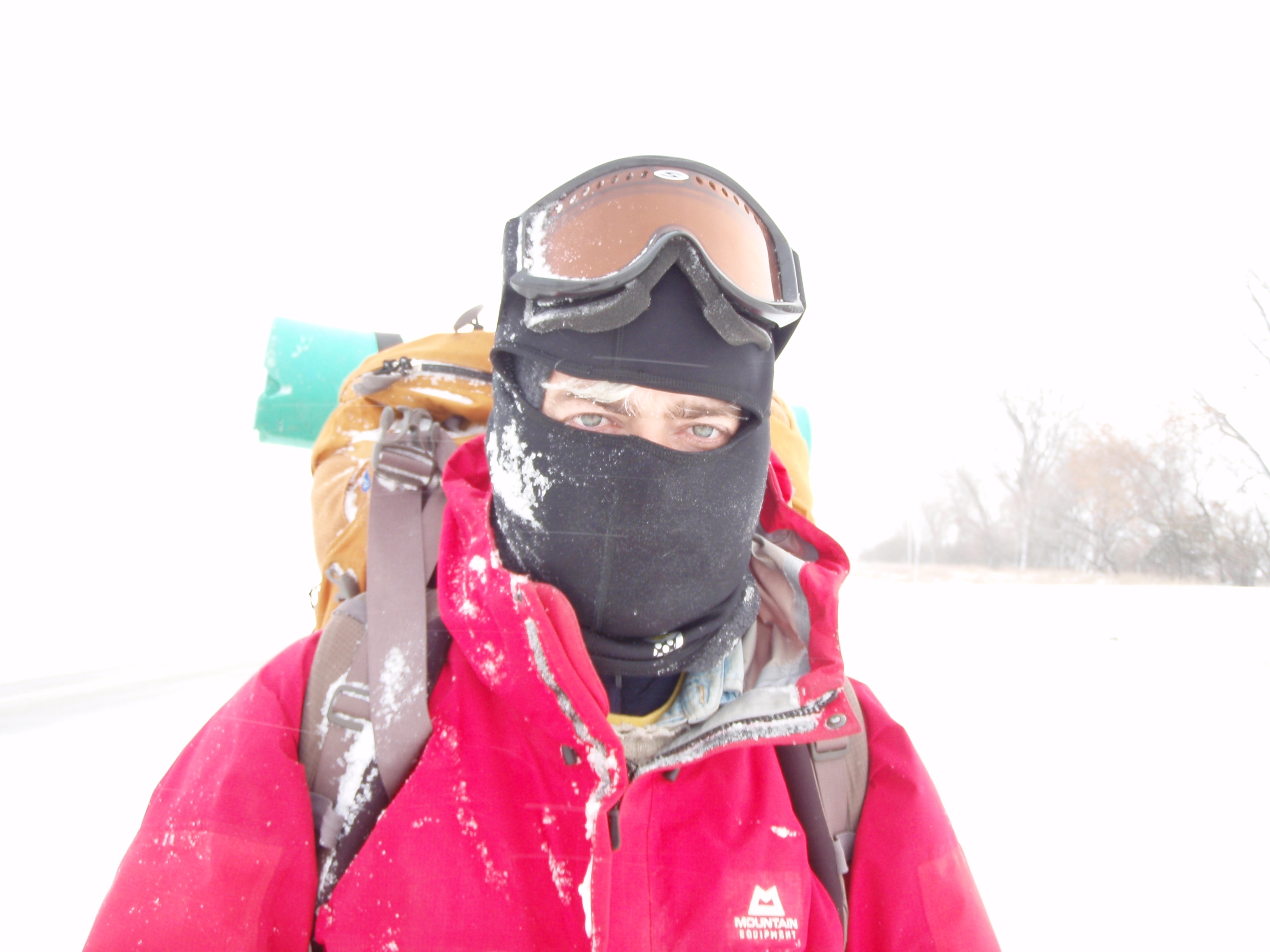
Colin Skinner wearing a balaclava during snow storm in North Dakota

Starting on 22 August 2009, he walked from Kennedy Airport in New York City to within 15 miles of Devil's Lake, North Dakota. This was a distance of 2,053 miles (3,304 km) and Skinner stopped his journey on 3 December 2009, after three days with windchills down to −30 Fahrenheit. During the trip Skinner had to make incisions in his feet to relieve the pressure from blisters, suffered food poisoning, met up with a wolf in Upper Michigan, had to face down two wild dogs, and had ski masks frozen to his beard in North Dakota. On the journey he appeared on television, radio and in newspaper articles. He also wrote a daily blog for the National Hospice Foundation. He met hospice patients, including one woman with a terminal illness, who said that at times she could forget she was ill, thanks to the care she received in a hospice house in Buffalo, New York. He also met a man with lung cancer who could not sleep in hospitals, where there was always someone coming to check on him. In the hospice house in Windsor, Ontario, the man had a peaceful room to himself, where he could finally get some rest.

=== U.S. in 2011 ===
On 10 September 2011, Skinner set off from mile marker 283 on U.S. Route 2, 15 miles (24 km) before Devil's Lake, North Dakota, and walked 2,576 miles (4,146 km) to Tuolumne Meadows in Yosemite National Park, California. The walk took him through North Dakota, Montana, Idaho, Utah, Arizona, Nevada and into California. Skinner snow-shoed over Tioga Pass and camped in a tent in the Sierra Mountains for several nights, but was forced to stop walking after suffering from frostbite in both feet. On the journey he appeared on television, radio and in newspapers and encouraged support for hospices taking care of people with serious illnesses. Skinner is now writing a book about this journey, entitled America- 12000 miles on foot, a wing and a prayer.

In September 2012, Skinner completed a short story, entitled Chenga, and published this on an Internet website. In October 2012, Skinner completed the second part of a science-fiction fantasy trilogy, entitled Djara, and published this on an Internet website.

Skinner has now begun writing the third part of the science-fiction fantasy trilogy, entitled Tau. The Chenga, Djara, Tau trilogy includes the themes of time travel, parallel universes, vampires, shapeshifters, angels, demons and descendants of the fabled giants known as the Nephilim.

In 2012 Skinner published four short poems: Gaia, The Dreaming, New Zealand Water Torture and Life Jim But Not As We Know It on an Internet website.

He is planning future walks through Australia, Japan, China, Tibet, Afghanistan, Iran, Iraq, Israel, Egypt and Europe.

== Books ==
- Beyond the Setting Sun – 6000 miles on foot for hospice. ISBN 1-4276-0913-6
- New Zealand – 1500 miles on foot through the Land of the Long White Cloud. ISBN 978-1-4276-2089-7

== See also ==
- List of pedestrian circumnavigators
