= Saith Seren =

Welsh-language centre in Wrexham, Wales

Y Saith Seren
- The Seven Stars (English)
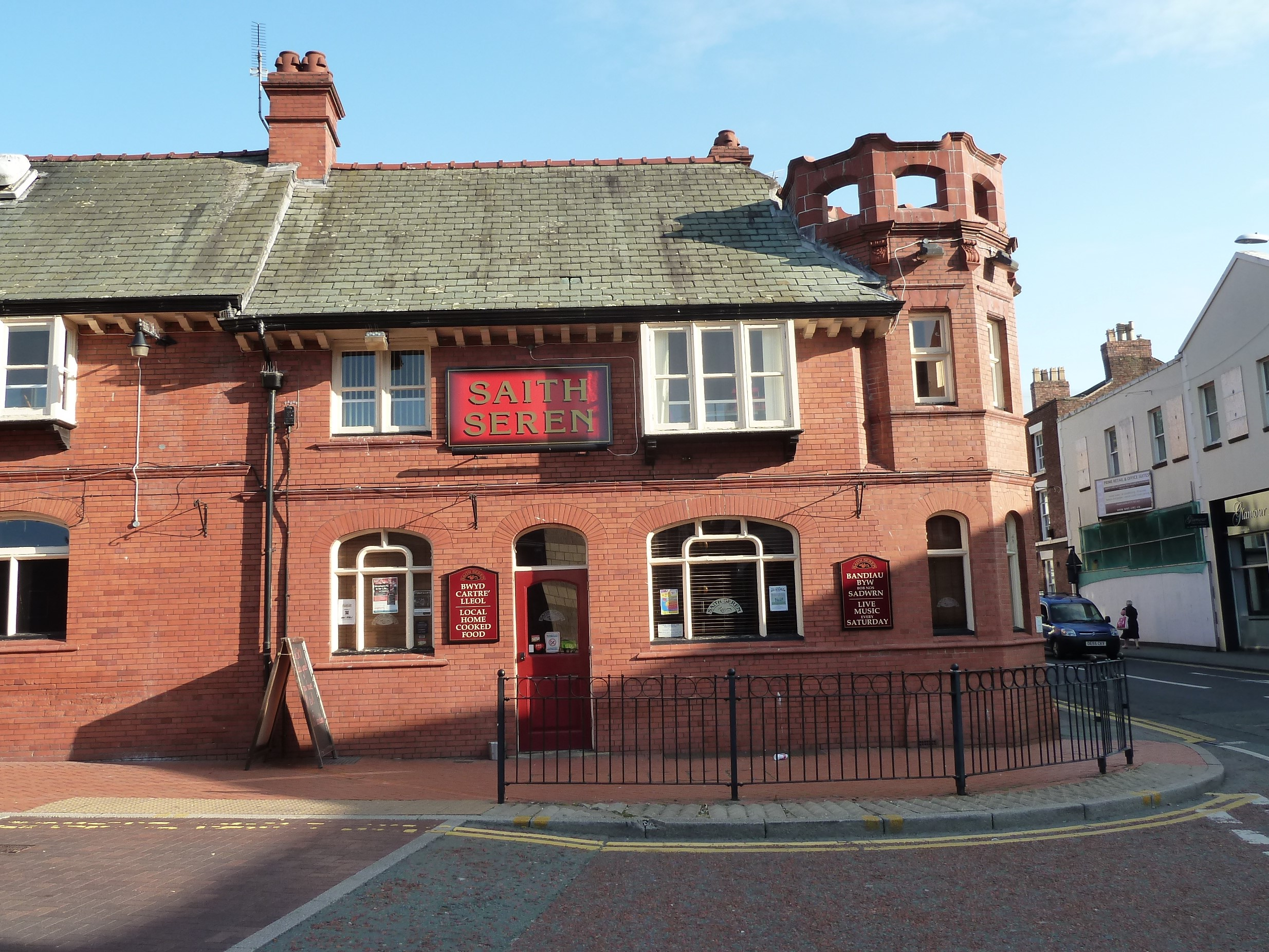
- Building from Lambpit Street, with Chester Street on the right
- Interactive map of the Y Saith Seren area
- Former names: Seven Stars Hotel; The Star

General information
- Type: Pub (1898–); Welsh-language community centre (2011–); Hotel (~20th century)
- Architectural style: “Commercial style” with Arts & Crafts
- Location: Chester Street, Wrexham, Wales
- Coordinates: 53.047°N 2.992°W
- Current tenants: Canolfan Gymraeg Wrecsam (2012–)
- Completed: 1898 (or by 1904)
- Owner: Canolfan Gymraeg Wrecsam (2023–); Clwyd Alyn Housing Association (2011–2023)

Technical details
- Floor count: 2

Design and construction
- Architect: Thomas Price

Website
- saithseren.org.uk

Listed Building – Grade II
- Official name: The Seven Stars Public House
- Designated: 31 January 1994
- Reference no.: 1849

Saith Seren (Welsh for 'Seven Stars'; its former name) is a Welsh-language community centre and pub in Wrexham, North Wales.

Located on the corner of Chester Street and Lambpit Street, the Grade II listed building dates to 1898, as a rebuilding of a previous pub located on the site. The rebuilt building was designed by Liverpool architect Thomas Price, who designed the building in a commercial style, incorporating elements of the Arts and Crafts style. The two-storey building is made of Ruabon red brick, and Price also designed the building adjacent, the former Empire Music Hall.

The building operated as the Seven Stars pub until 2011. A few months later, plans were announced to reopen the building as a community-run Welsh-language community centre and pub. The new centre opened as Saith Seren (Welsh for 'Seven Stars') in January 2012, under a lease from a new landlord. The landlord pressured the centre to close in 2015 over unmet finances, but community support raised enough funds to keep it open. The community co-operative running the centre, Canolfan Gymraeg Wrecsam, purchased the building in 2023.

== Description ==
The building, previously known as Seven Stars, of which the current name is a translation, is a Grade II listed building on the corner of Chester Street and Lambpit Street. It also was styled as the Seven Stars Hotel, or The Star.

The building dates to 1898. In 1898, the pub was rebuilt using Ruabon red brick in a commercial style, encompassing elements of Arts and Crafts, with Thomas Price of Liverpool as its architect, and Jack Scott as the builder until 1904.

The two-storey building is of brick, with a slate roof, and an asymmetrical plan, with its main entrance fronting Chester Street. The building extends along Lambpit Street, right of the central entrance, with a semi-octagonal tower on the angle between Chester Street and Lambpit Street. A former cinema, which opened as the Empire Music Hall, is adjacent to the building's Lambpit Street side and was added in 1902, also to the designs of Price. The cinema is claimed to have been the first purpose-built cinema in North Wales.

Upon its opening in 2012, it was operated by Canolfan Gymraeg Wrecsam, the Wrexham Welsh Centre. The centre serves as a centrepiece of the Welsh-speaking community in Wrexham city centre, as well as for Welsh-language learners. Clwb Clebran is held at the centre providing a space for Welsh-language learners. The centre also considered operating in the former cinema in 2013, and since forms part of the pub itself.

== History ==
=== Seven Stars ===
Records show the site first being licensed in the 1750s. The Stars inn is known to have existed on the site by 1769 and a public house has stood there for at least 200 years.

In 1880, the Seven Stars Inn was sold to its tenant, James Marshall, at auction for £2,500. The sale covered the inn, its large yard, as well as nine cottages along Chester Street and Lambpit Street.

In 1898, the pub was rebuilt using Ruabon red brick and to the designs of Thomas Price of Liverpool. During the rebuild, notable elements were added such as a turret on the building's corner and a colourful mural on the Chester Street gable. Price also designed the adjacent Empire Music Hall facing Lambpit Street, which now forms part of the pub itself. This rebuild replaced the previous inn and opened as the Seven Stars pub until its closure under that name in 2011.

=== Wrexham Welsh Centre (2011–) ===
==== Development plans ====
Plans were announced in September 2011, to make the building a Welsh-language cultural centre to become a location for Wrexham's Welsh-speaking population. Volunteers for the project stated they secured £19,000 from supporters to lease the venue. They hoped to open the venue by December 2011, and to raise £200,000 to buy or lease the building. The project was led by a Plaid Cymru councillor Marc Jones, who later became the centre's chair.

As part of the development, the building was bought by Clwyd Alyn Housing Association for £150,000 on the newly-formed co-operative's behalf which would run the centre. The co-operative later held rent negotiations with Clwyd Alyn, with the housing group also agreeing with the co-operative to conduct £1000s of repair work. The centre would open in phases, with the downstairs opening first, followed by the upstairs, which would be converted into offices and meeting rooms for general community meetings or Welsh-language classes. In September 2011, the project managers held £21,000 in funds for the centre's development but appealed for £60,000 needed to procure supplies and equipment for the kitchen and bar, as well as funds to make it through the Christmas period. The pub operates on an ownership model where 100 members could invest in the pub's development by contributing between £100 and £20,000, and would gain equal voting rights. The centre secured a 21-year lease of the building.

==== Opening and later developments ====
The building re-opened as a Welsh-language centre, under the name Saith Seren (Welsh for 'Seven Stars') in January 2012, and operated by the Canolfan Gymraeg Wrecsam (Welsh for 'Wrexham Welsh Language Centre') co-operative. The centre was developed following the 2011 Wrexham National Eisteddfod, in which the centre is attributed with the national eisteddfod's legacy. The centre's main aim is to focus on providing a Welsh-speaking environment for Welsh speakers, learners and supporters, as well as general Welsh culture. The pub would offer Welsh food, real ale, Welsh-language classes and be a general meeting place in dedicated rooms in the upstairs of the building. By the time of its conversion the pub had brewed its own beer and was looking for names from the public for one of their drinks.

In June 2012, the pub held a fundraiser for the Wrexham Supporters Trust which ran Wrexham A.F.C. at the time.

By 2013, the pub was the only community-owned pub in Wrexham, one of six in North Wales (which had the largest concentration of such in the UK). In the same year, the centre's management conducted a second share issue to raise £40,000 for the centre. The centre also claimed to have 100 members.

In May 2013, the pub looked into whether it could use the adjacent former Empire Cinema building which had been vacant for years.

In February 2015, the pub worked with the Rendezvous restaurant of Coleg Cambria, to launch a new menu.

==== Averted closure (2015) ====
In April 2015, it was announced that the centre would close by May 2015. The centre was ordered by the owner's of the building Pennaf Housing Group (which includes Clwyd Alyn) to vacate the building after being unable to pay their finances owed to the landlord, which stated was their "last resort". Welsh-language advocacy groups such as Dyfodol i'r Iaith, expressed their disappointment with the announced closure. While Cymdeithas yr Iaith Gymraeg, in support of the centre, wrote a letter to First Minister of Wales, Carwyn Jones calling for support to keep the centre open.

Following the closure announcement, the centre managed to raise £2,600 in monthly pledges to keep the centre, including donations from companies. Supporters of the centre eventually met their £3,000 a month target to keep the centre open. Following the near closure, the centre looked into how to improve the long-term future of the centre. Directors of the centre claimed that the venue's location, not enough customers and general difficulties in the pub industry as reasons why the pub struggled.

==== Recent history ====
In 2016, the pub applied for permission to fly four different Welsh flags from the building, but was deferred by the council to the Welsh Government for the decision because it was a listed building. Operators of the pub complained of the delay.

In January 2017, the pub announced it would host a monthly shop for Welsh goods, such as books, cards, crafts, CDs and others, from the centre. This follows the announced closure of a nearby Welsh goods shop Siop y Siswrn in the Wrexham People's Market. The monthly shop would work with Siop Cwlwm, which sells Welsh goods in Oswestry market.

In November 2020, Ryan Reynolds and Rob McElhenney (new owners of Wrexham A.F.C.) sent three cases of Aviation Gin (connected to Reynolds) to the pub.

In August 2023, the building was bought by the co-operative which had operated the bar and centre since 2011, taking over the previous long-term lease from Clwyd Alyn Housing Association.
