= Dyfodol i'r Iaith =

Organisation promoting Welsh Language

Dyfodol i'r Iaith (transl. 'A Future for the Language') is a non-party political organisation in Wales that works to ensure that the Welsh language occupies a central role in Welsh life and remains a priority on the political agenda. It is a lobbying pressure group which works exclusively through constitutional means, seeking to influence the Welsh Government, local government, political parties, the heads of public bodies and others to place the language at the heart of their policies and actions.

== History and background ==
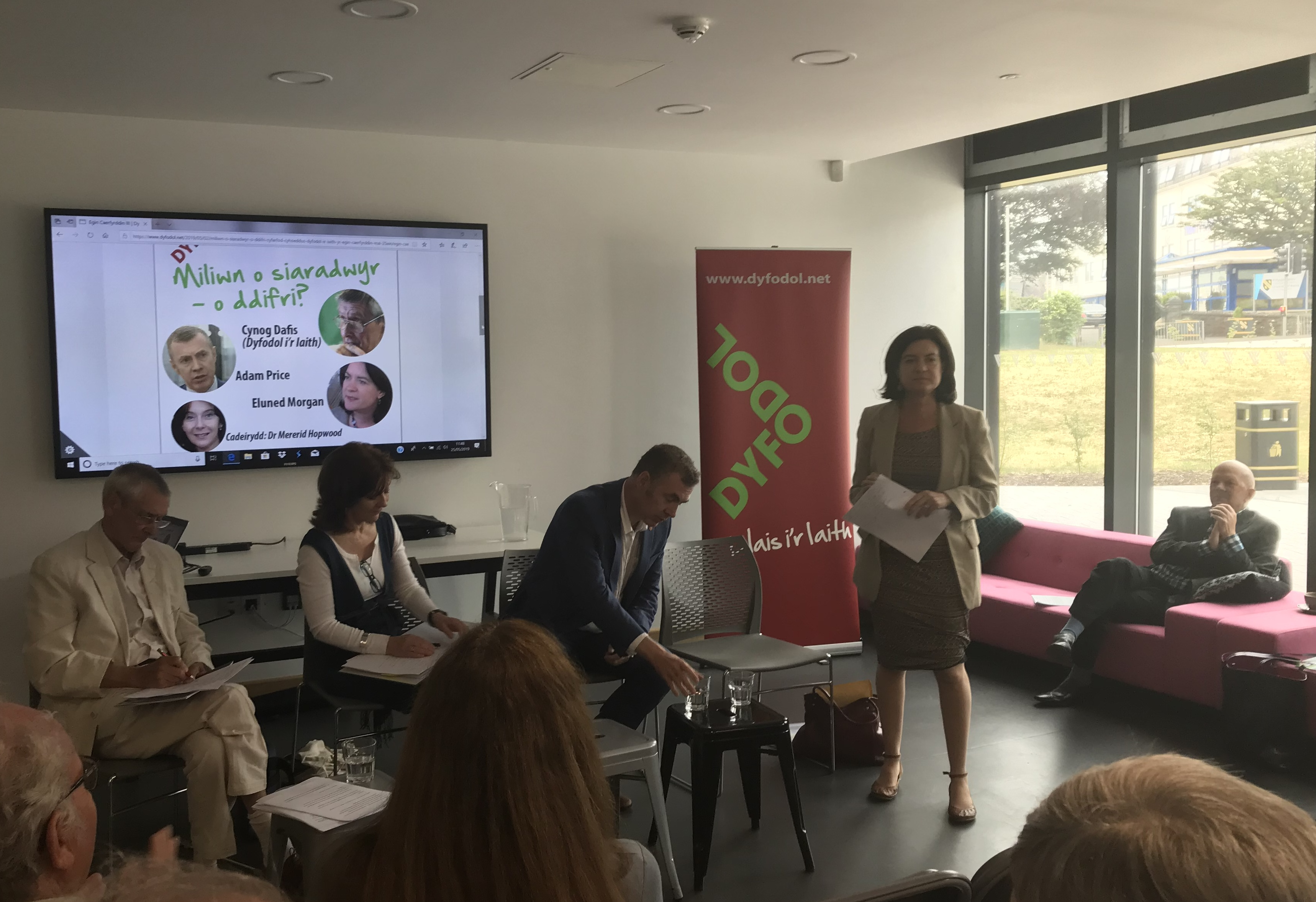
Eluned Morgan, the Welsh Government Minister for the Welsh Language, speaking at a Dyfodol i'r Iaith meeting in 2019

The organisation was set up at a meeting held in June 2012 at the Tŷ Tawe Welsh Language Centre in Swansea. The original board included Heini Gruffudd, Simon Brooks, Richard Wyn Jones, Robat Gruffudd, Emyr Lewis, Elin Wyn and Huw Ll. Edwards.

The first annual general meeting was held at the 2012 National Eisteddfod in the Vale of Glamorgan, with Beti George, Angharad Mair and Emyr Lewis addressing the meeting.

== Board and staff ==
The current chair is Heini Gruffudd. The chief executive, Ruth Richards, and development officer, Meinir James, are employed by the organisation. As of 2021, the board members are Eifion Lloyd Jones, Iwan Edgar, Wyn Thomas, Cynog Dafis, Robat Gruffudd, Catrin Alun, Elaine Edwards and Heini Gruffudd. Beti George, Angharad Mair, Elinor Jones, and Bethan Jones Parry have all, at various times, served as president.

== Funding ==
Dyfodol i'r Iaith is an independent and non–party-political organisation, whose only sources of income are membership subscriptions and donations from individuals and companies that share its vision.

== Campaigns ==
Since its formation, the organisation has campaigned for and influenced in favour of:

- Founding a dozen Welsh Language Centres
- Setting up a second popular Welsh-language radio channel: BBC Radio Cymru 2
- Ensuring consideration for the Welsh language as part of the planning process
- Founding the Canolfan Genedlaethol Cymraeg i Oedolion ('National Welsh-language Centre for Adults')
- Emphasis being given to the promotion of Welsh within the community and the education system
- Establishing the principle of holistic language planning in relation to the Welsh language

Dyfodol i'r Iaith is a member of the Dathlu'r Gymraeg umbrella group.

In 2019, the organisation published Planning the Regeneration of the Welsh Language, which highlights the language planning priorities. These priorities also informed the November 2020 publication, Aspiration and Achievement – Dyfodol i'r Iaith's proposals for Welsh-language Policy 2021-2026, which set out the organisation's vision for the 2021 Senedd election.

Dyfodol i'r Iaith wishes to see the Welsh Government establish an arm's-length language authority with sufficient resources to steer the Welsh language into the future.
