= Megan Angharad Hunter =

Welsh writer born c.1998

Megan Angharad Hunter (born c. 1998) is a Welsh writer who in 2021 won the Crown at the Urdd National Eisteddfod and the Welsh-language Wales Book of the Year Award.

== Early life ==
Hunter is from Penygroes, Gwynedd. Her father Jerry Hunter is an academic and author, who won the National Eisteddfod of Wales Prose Medal. Her mother is an actress. Hunter went on to study Welsh and Philosophy at Cardiff University.

== Writing ==
Hunter won the literary medal at the 2019 Anglesey Eisteddfod and came close to winning the Crown, the main prose prize, at the Urdd National Eisteddfod in the same year. She was awarded the Literature Wales New Author Scholarship in 2020.

In 2020 she submitted a piece of writing to the Crown competition at the Urdd National Eisteddfod, but the 2020 event was postponed due to the COVID-19 pandemic. She had to wait until October 2021 for the result when she was announced as the virtual "Eisteddfod T" 2020/21 winner, being presented with the prize at an online ceremony. Her work, a piece of prose of more than 4,000 words submitted under the pen name Lina, was on the theme of Mwgwd/Mygydau ('Mask/Masks') and written both in an academic style and partly in the language of a child.

Shortly before her Urdd win, in August 2021 Hunter won the Literature Wales 2021 Welsh-language Wales Book of the Year Award, for her debut novel tu ôl i’r awyr ('behind the sky'). Two days beforehand the novel had been announced as winner of the Welsh-language Fiction Award. The book offered a glimpse into the lives of two young adults, Anest and Deian. In 2025 Firefly Press acquired the rights to publish the book in English, under the name Behind the Sky.

She won the 2024 Tir na n-Og Award in the secondary school age category, for her Welsh-language children's book Astronot yn yr Atig ('Astronaut in the Attic'). The winners were announced at a special ceremony at the 2024 Urdd National Eisteddfod in Meifod.

== Personal life ==
Hunter has moderate hearing loss, but enjoys playing the flute and guitar.
