= Alwyn D. Rees =

Welsh geographer, social anthropologist and Welsh nationalist (1911–1974)

Alwyn David Rees (27 March 1911 – 6 December 1974) was a Welsh geographer, social anthropologist and Welsh nationalist, who wrote as Alwyn D. Rees. After studying geography and anthropology at the University College of Wales, Aberystwyth, he was a tutor in the College's External Department from 1936 to 1946. He was a lecturer in the Department of Geography and Anthropology until 1949, when he was appointed Director of the External Studies Department. Rees pioneered the rural sociology of Britain with Life in a Welsh countryside (1950), a community study of the Welsh village of Llanfihangel yng Ngwynfa. From 1966 until his death he edited the Welsh magazine Barn.

== Early life ==
Alwyn D. Rees was born in Llanarel, Coalbrook, Gorseinon on 27 March 1911. His father was a winder in the Mynydd (Mountain) colliery in Gorseinon. Alwyn was the oldest of four children, including Brinley Rees. After attending primary school in Penyrheol and Gowerton County School, he continued to the University College of Wales, Aberystwyth, gaining a first-class degree in geography and anthropology in 1933. In 1934 he gained a diploma in education and a teachers' certificate. Granted a Sir John Williams studentship to study Welsh literature, he gained an MA in 1937 with research on pagan survivals in early Celtic Christianity.

== Life in a Welsh Countryside and community studies ==
From 1936 to 1946 Rees worked for the College's extramural department as a tutor in Montgomeryshire. In 1938 the College's Principal, Ifor Evans, suggested to Rees that he carry out a study of a rural Welsh-speaking community. Others encouraging Rees in the project included Daryll Forde, Professor E. G. Bowen and Professor H. J. Fleure.

The motives are not entirely clear, but one suspects that an attempt was being made to record the dying Welsh culture before it succumbed to encroaching English influences. The original intention was to do a series of such studies of selected communities in various parts of Wales, but, as in Ireland, war intervened and the project was only continued some years later.

Rees conducted fieldwork in Llanfihangel yng Ngwynfa, a Welsh-speaking rural parish, in 1939 and 1940, and continued to visit the parish regularly throughout the Second World War. In 1946 Emrys Bowen appointed Rees to the department of geography and anthropology. Rees's own study of Llanfihangel yng Ngwynfa was published in 1950 as Life in a Welsh Countryside. One anthropological emphasis was on the joking relations between the young men's group and the rest of the community, which Rees argued served to reinforce community norms. Rees and Bowen encouraged a series of studies of Welsh rural communities at the university. From 1954 to 1960 they worked to co-edit Welsh Rural Communities, a published collection of community studies. Rees's student Bill Williams published The Sociology of an English Village: Gosforth in 1964.

== Later activities ==
From 1949 to 1958 Rees edited the journal of the Guild of Graduates of the University of Wales, Yr Einion/The Welsh Anvil.

Celtic Heritage (1961), written with his brother Brinley, tried to place Celtic heritage in a wider Indo-European framework, presenting parallels between Irish mythology and Indian literature.

Rees became a Welsh nationalist in the late 1950s. He defended the federal structure of the University of Wales in 1960, successfully resisting the break-up of the university. In February 1966 Rees became editor of the Welsh-language literary magazine Barn, using his editorship to articulate the Welsh nationalist cause. He was a keen supporter of the Welsh Language Association campaigns.

Rees continued to wield influence on University committees. From 1968 to 1971 he was Warden of the college's Guild of Graduates. In summer 1973, he warned the University Council that he intended to bring in a minority report against University expansionism.

Unwell since 1973, Rees died of a heart attack on 6 December 1974.

== Reputation ==
The National Library of Wales holds a collection of Rees's papers. In 2019 M Wynn Thomas delivered a lecture in memory of his Rees's efforts to save the University of Wales in the early 1960s, and his role in securing Pantycelyn Hall as a Welsh-speaking hall of residence.

== Works ==
- Affeilion. 1943.
- Life in a Welsh countryside, a social study of Llanfihangel yng Ngwynfa. Cardiff: University of Wales Press, 1950.
- (ed. with Elwyn Davies) Welsh rural communities. Cardiff: University of Wales Press, 1960.
- (with Brinley Rees) Celtic heritage: ancient tradition in Ireland and Wales. London: Thames & Hudson, 1961.
- The magistrate's dilemma vis-à-vis the Welsh language offender. Llandybie: C. Davies, 1968.
- Ym Marn Alwyn D. Rees [In the opinion of Alwyn D. Rees], ed. Bobi Jones. Abertawe: Christopher Davies, 1976.
