= Heno =

Welsh television magazine

- Programme logo
- Genre: News magazine
- Country of origin: United Kingdom (Wales)
- Original language: Welsh

Production
- News editor: Angharad Mair
- Production locations: Llanelli, Caernarfon
- Running time: 30 or 60 minutes (including advertisements)
- Production company: Tinopolis

Original release
- Network: S4C
- Release: 17 September 1990 – December 2002
- Release: 1 March 2012 – present

Related
- Wedi 7; Prynhawn Da

Heno (Welsh for 'Tonight') is a Welsh television magazine and chat show programme. Broadcast live on S4C weeknights at 7:00 pm, it features topical stories and studio guests. Various reporters also assist with subject-specific presenting, both in the studio and on location or through filmed segments. Its afternoon sister programme is called Prynhawn da (Welsh for 'Good Afternoon').

== Background ==
Heno was first broadcast on S4C on Monday 17 September 1990, made by production company Agenda (which became Tinopolis) in Swansea. It was replaced by a similar programme, Wedi 7 (Welsh for 'After 7'), in January 2002.

Heno returned on 1 March 2012, after Tinopolis won a £5.1 million contract. The show is broadcast from Tinopolis's Llanelli studio. In May 2012, they re-opened their studio in Caernarfon (which they had recently closed) following complaints that the programme was too Llanelli-based. The Caernarfon studio created content about North and Mid-Wales.

== Format ==
In its original run, Heno was broadcast at 6pm each weekday but since its return it is shown between 7pm and 7:30pm on Mondays to Fridays. Broadcasts are live, with a variety of guests chatting with the presenters in the Llanelli studio. Several reporters provide short items of interest from around Wales.

== Presenters ==
It was originally presented by Angharad Mair, Sian Thomas, Iestyn Garlick and Glynog Davies (now a producer of the programme). Mair and Thomas are still (2015) regular presenters.
