= Bilidowcar =

Welsh language children's television series

- Genre: Entertainment
- Country of origin: United Kingdom (Wales)
- Original language: Welsh

Original release
- Network: BBC Wales
- Release: 1975 – 1982
- Network: S4C
- Release: 1982 – 1988

Bilidowcar is a television magazine programme for children which was originally broadcast on BBC Wales. It was created in 1975 as BBC Wales' response to the children's programme Blue Peter. The programme transferred to S4C after the launch of the channel in 1982 and continued until 1988. The programme presented a number of varied topics, with items in the studio and on film. The presenters also travelled to a number of countries around the world to show stories from places such as America, Indonesia, Bangkok, among others.

It had number of presenters over the years. The first presenters were Hywel Gwynfryn and Marged Esli (cy) and a number of other presenters included Naomi Jones (cy) and Caryl Parry Jones who joined in 1979 after graduating.

After moving to S4C, new presenters included Emyr Davies (cy), Dewi Williams, Angharad Mair and Ynyr Williams (cy). After Mair left to become a newsreader, Liz Scourfield and other presenters joined.

Bilidowcar is the Welsh word for cormorant.
