= Wilma Rusman =

Dutch long-distance runner (born 1958)

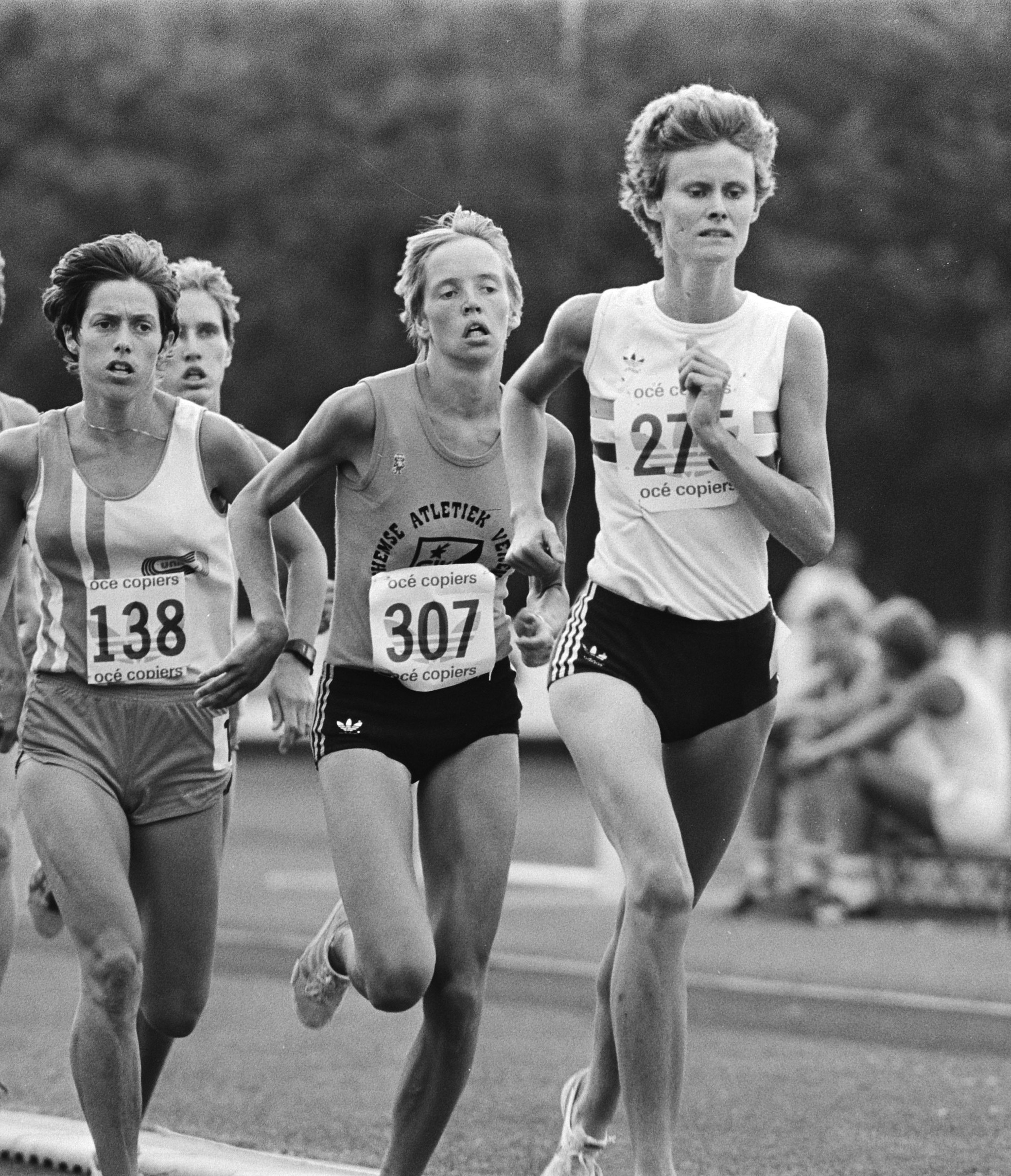
Wilma Rusman (left, No.138) with Saskia Brouwer (middle, No.307) and Elly van Hulst (right, No.275) during a Dutch national 1500 m in the Netherlands in 1983

Wilma Rusman née Zukrowski (born 14 May 1958 in Sittard) is a Dutch long-distance runner. She won the 1985 edition of the Rotterdam Marathon, clocking 2:35:32 on April 20, 1985.

== Achievements ==
Year	Competition	Venue	Position	Event	Notes
Representing the Netherlands
1983	New York City Marathon	New York City, United States	28th	Marathon	2:44:03
1985	Egmond Half Marathon	Egmond aan Zee, Netherlands	1st	Half Marathon	1:22:21
1985	Rotterdam Marathon	Rotterdam, Netherlands	1st	Marathon	2:35:32
1986	New York City Marathon	New York City, United States	17th	Marathon	2:40:42
1989	Reykjavik Marathon	Reykjavík, Iceland	1st	Marathon	2:47:25
