= Reykjavík Marathon =

Annual marathon in Reykjavik, Iceland

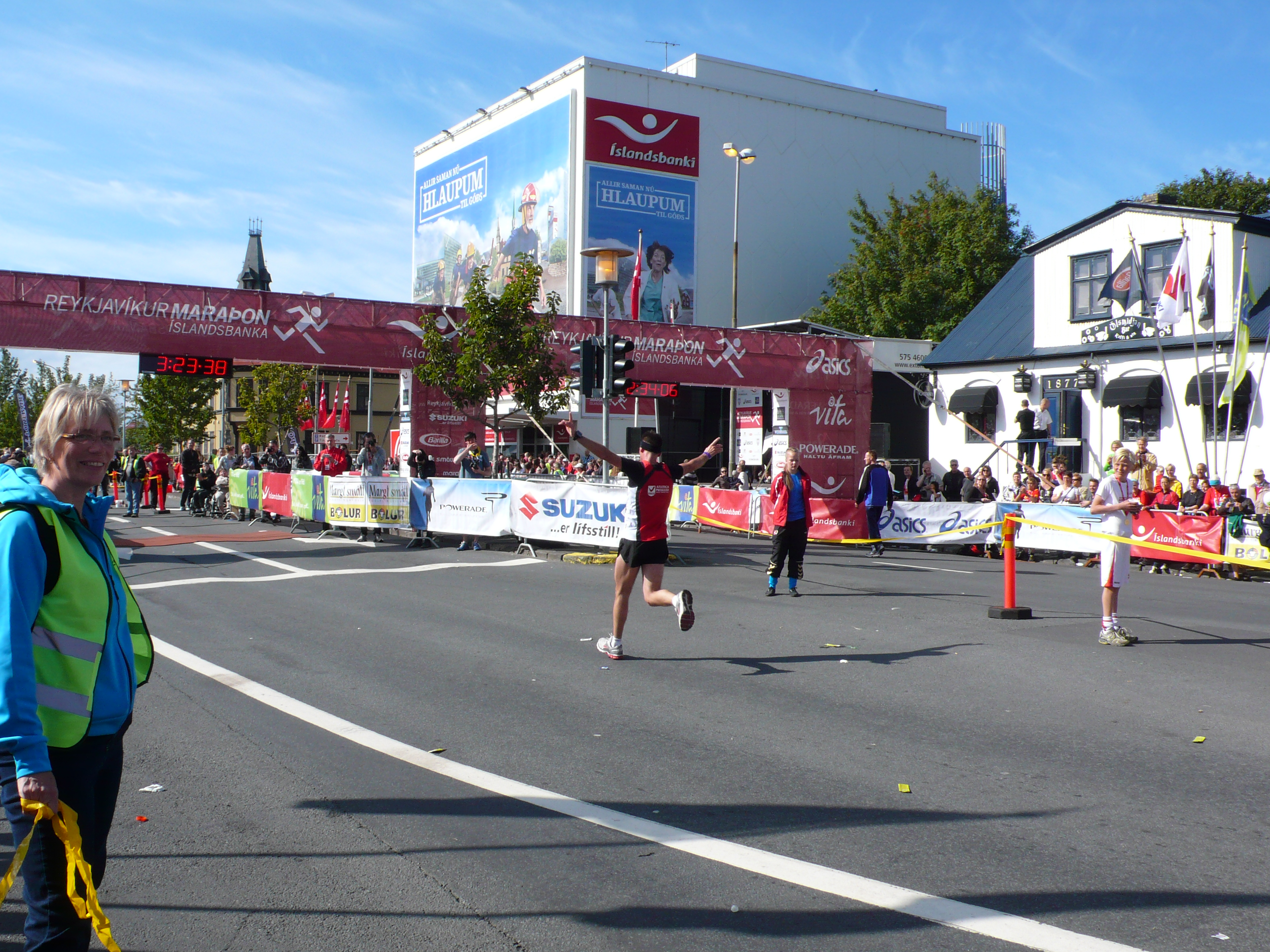
- Finish line of the 2011 Reykjavík Marathon
- Date: August
- Location: Reykjavík, Iceland
- Event type: Road
- Distance: Marathon, Half marathon, 10K run
- Primary sponsor: Íslandsbanki
- Established: 1984
- Course records: Men's: 2:17:06 (1993) (Lithuania) Ceslovas Kundrotas; Women's: 2:38:47 (1996) (United Kingdom) Angharad Mair
- Website: Official website
- Participants: 1,180 (2019)

The Reykjavík Marathon (Icelandic: Reykjavíkurmaraþon) is an annual marathon set in Reykjavík, Iceland, held to coincide with the city's Cultural Night Festival in mid-August. It has taken place every year since 1984, with the exception of 2020 and 2021. Along with the full marathon a half marathon and several races of shorter distances are arranged. In 2011 a total of 12,481 people competed in the various events that were held, 595 solely in the full marathon.

Since 2006 the marathon has been sponsored by the Icelandic bank Íslandsbanki, known as Glitnir between 2006 and 2009.

== Past winners (marathon) ==
Key: Course record

Year	Men's winner	Nationality	Time (h:m:s)
2024	José Sousa	Portugal	2:20:33
2023	Silviu Stoica	Romania	2:29:27
2019	Arnar Pétursson	Iceland	2:23:08
2018	Benjamin Zywicki	(United States) USA	2:23:43
2017	Arnar Pétursson	Iceland	2:28:17
2016	David Le Porho	Canada	2:29:45
2015	Bartosz Olszewski	Poland	2:29:30
2014	Matt Pelletier	(United States) USA	2:18:00
2013	James Buis	(United Kingdom) Great Britain	2:33:49
2012	Arnar Pétursson	Iceland	2:41:06
2011	Arnar Pétursson	Iceland	2:44:18
2010	Björn Margeirsson	Iceland	2:33:57
2009	David Kirkland	(United Kingdom) Great Britain	2:28:48
2008	David Kirkland	(United Kingdom) Great Britain	2:32:52
2007	Simon Tanui	Kenya	2:24:00
2006	Jiří Wallenfels	Czech Republic	2:33:27
2005	Mans Höiom	Sweden	2:29:10
2004	Mans Höiom	Sweden	2:26:34
2003	Peter Vail	Canada	2:41:07
2002	Piotr Uciechowski	Poland	2:45:25
2001	Bruce Kilulai	Kenya	2:28:14
2000	Charles Hubbard	(United States) USA	2:34:12
1999	Ryan Board	(United States) USA	2:48:12
1998	Daniel Rathbone	(United Kingdom) Great Britain	2:31:39
1997	Toby Tanser	Sweden	2:27:07
1996	Hugh Jones	(United Kingdom) Great Britain	2:24:16
1995	Hugh Jones	(United Kingdom) Great Britain	2:29:26
1994	Pavel Kryska	Czech Republic	2:22:41
1993	Česlovas Kundrotas	Lithuania	2:17:06
1992	Ieuan Ellis	(United Kingdom) Great Britain	2:19:01
1991	Kevin Brown	(United Kingdom) Great Britain	2:32:32
1990	Jeremy Hall	(United Kingdom) Great Britain	2:24:07
1989	Robin Nash	(United Kingdom) Great Britain	2:25:49
1988	Borut Podgornik	(Socialist Federal Republic of Yugoslavia) Yugoslavia	2:27:27
1987	James Doig	(United Kingdom) Great Britain	2:19:46
1986	Boudjenane Chaibi	France	2:20:30
1985	Josef Hermann	West Germany	2:30:04
1984	Sigurdur-Petur Sigmundsson	Iceland	2:28:57

Year	Women's winner	Nationality	Time (h:m:s)
2024	Anca Irina Faiciuc	Romania	3:06:20
2023	Andrea Kolbeinsdóttir	Iceland	2:42:15
2019	Barbora Nováková	Czech Republic	3:00:40
2018	Sara Lasker	(United States) USA	2:58:50
2017	Natasha Yaremczuk	Canada	2:53:25
2016	Betty Bohane	(United Kingdom) Great Britain	3:06:27
2015	Kaisa Kukk	Estonia	2:53:09
2014	Sarah Brown	(United Kingdom) Great Britain	3:01:47
2013	Melanie Staley	(United Kingdom) Great Britain	2:55:14
2012	Mary Brown	(United States) USA	3:04:03
2011	Veronika S. Bjarnardóttir	Iceland	3:02:42
2010	Rannveig Oddsdóttir	Iceland	2:57:33
2009	Veronika S. Bjarnadóttir	Iceland	3:08:18
2008	Rozalyn Alexander	(United Kingdom) Great Britain	3:01:01
2007	Sarah Kathryn Knudson	Canada	3:21:19
2006	Nathalie Freyling	France	3:34:31
2005	Bryndís Ernstsdóttir	Iceland	2:55:39
2004	Kate Davis	(United States) USA	2:59:51
2003	Sonya Anderson	(United States) USA	3:04:11
2002	Rannveig Oddsdóttir	Iceland	3:12:13
2001	Britta Homer	(United Kingdom) Great Britain	3:13:41
2000	Jackie Bale	(United Kingdom) Great Britain	3:20:37
1999	Ida Mitten	Canada	2:56:15
1998	Lorraine Masuoka	(United States) USA	2:45:45
1997	Ruth Kingsborough	(United Kingdom) Great Britain	2:51:35
1996	Angharad Mair	(United Kingdom) Great Britain	2:38:47
1995	Carolyn Hunter-Rowe	(United Kingdom) Great Britain	2:56:40
1994	Kim-Marie Goff	(United States) USA	2:47:27
1993	Elisabeth Singer	Austria	2:55:07
1992	Anna Jeeves	Iceland	3:21:28
1991	Sandra Bentley	(United Kingdom) Great Britain	2:48:38
1990	Susan Shield	(United Kingdom) Great Britain	2:59:58
1989	Wilma Rusman	Netherlands	2:47:25
1988	Connie Eriksen	Denmark	3:00:54
1987	Maeann Garty	(United States) USA	3:59:37
1986	Carol Macario	(United Kingdom) Great Britain	2:58:09
1985	Leslie Watson	(United Kingdom) Great Britain	2:52:44
1984	Leslie Watson	(United Kingdom) Great Britain	2:53:47

== Past winners (Half marathon) ==
Key: Course record

Year	Men's winner	Time (h:m:s)
2023	Willy Fink (USA)	1:04:48
2019	Hlynur Andrésson (ISL)	1:07:59
2018	Raymond McCormack (USA)	1:05:17
2017	Hlynur Andrésson (ISL)	1:09:08
2016	Hlynur Andrésson (ISL)	1:10:04
2015	Hlynur Andrésson (ISL)	1:09:35
2014	Will Christian (USA)	1:08:44
2013	Kári Steinn Karlsson (ISL)	1:07:40
2012	Þorbergur Ingi Jónsson (ISL)	1:09:23
2011	Kári Steinn Karlsson (ISL)	1:05:35
2010	Oliver Steininger (GER)	1:16:11
2009	Károly Varga (HUN)	1:13:30
2008	John Muriithi Mwaniki (KEN)	1:07:28
2007	Benjamin Serem (KEN)	1:04:09

Year	Women's winner	Time (h:m:s)
2023	Halldóra Huld Ingvarsdóttir (ISL)	1:20:07
2019	Alexandra Niels (USA)	1:18:40
2018	Jess Draskau-Petersson (DEN)	1:15:58
2017	Elín Edda Sigurðardóttir (ISL)	1:21:25
2016	Helen Ólafsdóttir (ISL)	1:24:32
2015	Kara Waters (USA)	1:22:39
2014	Helen Ólafsdóttir (ISL)	1:23:36
2013	Helen Ólafsdóttir (ISL)	1:22:57
2012	Martha Ernstsdóttir (ISL)	1:23:00
2011	Rannveig Oddsdóttir (ISL)	1:24:05
2010	Íris Anna Skúladóttir (ISL)	1:26:55
2009	Martha Ernstsdóttir (ISL)	1:23:09
2008	Martha Ernstsdóttir (ISL)	1:23:19
2007	Cathy Mutwa (KEN)	1:17:30

== Homepage ==
- Official Site
