= Judith Humphreys =

Welsh actress

- Occupations: film actress, charity worker
- Years active: 1988–present
- Spouse: Jerry Hunter (1998–present)
- Children: 2

Judith Humphreys is a Welsh actress who appeared in the films Hedd Wyn and The Storms of August. She has also worked with charities Christian Aid and Cofis Bach. In 2014 she founded Codi'r To, a Welsh organisation similar to that of El Sistema.
