= Barn (Welsh magazine) =

Welsh-language current affairs magazine

- September 2007 cover of Barn
- Type: Monthly current affairs magazine
- Format: Magazine
- Owner: Board of trustees
- Editor: Vaughan Hughes, Menna Baines
- Founded: 1962
- Political alignment: Welsh nationalist
- Headquarters: Swyddfa Barn, Y Llwyfan, Ffordd y Coleg, Caerfyrddin / Carmarthen, SA31 3EQ
- Website: barn.cymru

Barn (Welsh for "Opinion") is a monthly Welsh language current affairs magazine. It was established in 1962 and over 500 issues have been published. Its first editor was Emlyn Evans and it was published by Llyfrau'r Dryw, Llandybie (later Swansea). Its current editors are now Vaughan Hughes and Menna Baines, who took over from Dyfrig Jones in 2008, and the magazine is now published by Gwasg Dinefwr.

Barn includes articles relating to politics, language, culture, art and sport from Wales, the UK and abroad from a Welsh perspective. The magazine has a prominent place in the history of the Welsh language and the Welsh nationalist movement in the second half of the 20th century, particularly under the editorship of Alwyn D. Rees.

== Editors ==
- Emlyn Evans
- Aneirin Talfan Davies
- Alwyn D. Rees
- Gwyn Erfyl
- Robert Rhys
- Menna Baines
- Simon Brooks
- Dyfrig Jones
- Vaughan Hughes
- Menna Baines
