= Richard Brunstrom =

British police officer

Richard Brunstrom QPM (born September 1954, Nottingham) is a retired British senior police officer. He was nicknamed the "Mad Mullah of the Traffic Taliban" by motorists because of his strong views against speeding. He was the Chief Constable of North Wales Police from January 2001 to July 2009. As such he carried through vigorous changes of strategy, including a campaign to reduce road deaths which attracted high-profile attacks in national media. On his retirement the chair of the North Wales Police Authority said "Under his leadership north Wales has become one of the best performing forces in the UK."

== Early life ==
Brunstrom's father Geoff (1925–2016) was a geologist of Swedish descent. He grew up in Surrey. Brunstrom graduated in Zoology from Bangor University. He got two years into a Zoology PhD degree but then joined the police. His brother is the author Alan Brunstrom (born 1956).

== Career ==
He joined Sussex Police. After 11 years, in 1990 he moved to Greater Manchester Police as a Superintendent serving initially in Old Trafford, regularly commanded the policing of Manchester United and Manchester City home football games. He then became a Divisional Commander at Bury. Brunstrom was appointed Assistant Chief Constable in the Cleveland Police in September 1995, subsequently promoted to Deputy Chief Constable.

== North Wales Police ==
Brunstrom joined North Wales Police as Deputy Chief Constable in January 2000, and was appointed Chief Constable of the Force in January 2001. He has commented that he needed to stir up debate as politicians were too afraid of unpopularity to address pressing issues. He expressed his willingness to prosecute MPs about any illegal expenses.

Her Majesty's Inspectorate of Constabulary praised Brunstrom's successful implementation of the performance culture. They also praised the consistently high proportion of crimes detected by North Wales Police which led to an out-of-court disposal or a court conviction and sentence. Under his leadership, the detection culture was a key feature of policing and a priority within the police force. For a number of years, North Wales Police was one of the leading forces in terms of its detection rate.

=== Road safety ===
He was ACPO's head of road policing policy. In North Wales, Brunstrom's "Arrive Alive" campaign against speeding drivers captured record numbers of speeding drivers. He personally supervised the crushing of two cars as part of his force's campaign against 'boy racers'. He said that the campaign had been successful in saving lives. The BBC Two programme Top Gear attacked him in a way described as "puerile" by North Wales Police. More attacks appeared in The Sun and the Daily Express, among other media. The BNP described him as "the Mad Mullah of the speed Taliban".

In a private presentation to reporters in May 2007, Brunstrom launched a new approach to speeding, offering courses and training rather than points and fines. Brunstrom used a series of photographs of dead motorists to emphasize the seriousness of road safety. Mark Gibney was 40 years old, motorcycling at 95 mph, when he was decapitated in an accident in 2003. Brunstrom had photographs of Gibney's decapitated body inserted after an earlier draft of the presentation was not "gruesome" enough. He was investigated by the IPCC, which found that he had broken no rules. However, it gave him a warning "for failing to warn the family that the images would be used." and for expecting to be able to show the images to reporters without their being reported. Albert Owen, the Labour MP for Anglesey, said that the controversy surrounding him overshadowed the work of the police. However, public perception of the North Wales police did not worsen when Brunstrom was mentioned. Brunstrom apologised to Gibney's family and admitted making a mistake he regretted. He said that he would if given the choice use the photograph again, but would approach the family first.

=== Drug decriminalisation ===
Brunstrom has called for the decriminalisation of all drugs – including heroin and cocaine – and has urged the Government to declare an end to the "failed" war on illegal narcotics. He was police co-ordinator on drugs policy across Wales.

=== Welsh language ===
Brunstrom has been praised for his learning and promotion of the Welsh language, in which he holds an A level. This has led to his being created an honorary Druid by the Gorsedd of Bards list at the 2006 National Eisteddfod, and in April 2007 he made a speech to Welsh communities pressure group Cymuned in which he urged politicians to update the 1993 Welsh Language Act, saying he was doing his duty by raising it.

=== CCTV, antisocial behaviour ===
Brunstrom was very supportive of the use of CCTV in general as a tool in the fight against petty crime and environmental crime, such as dogs defecating in public places.

=== Trial of Taser ===
In September 2007, as a demonstration of support for Tasers being trialed in rural areas of North Wales, Brunstrom volunteered to be tasered by his fellow officers. Video footage of the event was posted on the force's website; Brunstrom was tasered for 1.5 seconds, and swore as he lost control of his body. Afterwards he described the event as "Not pleasant" and warned "I very strongly advise you, if faced by an officer and a Taser, that you follow the instructions of the nice police officer, because you will not enjoy the consequences of disobedience.".

=== Weekend working ===
Wanting to get in to North Wales Police headquarters to work at a weekend, and finding that his key fob did not work, Brunstrom broke in to his headquarters, scaling scaffolding attached to the building and climbing through a window. It was initially claimed that this was a stunt to expose lax security.

=== Wildlife crime ===
He was head of the UK's National Wildlife Crime Unit.

=== Honours and retirement ===

Ribbon	Description	Notes
	Queen's Police Medal (QPM)	2006
	Queen Elizabeth II Golden Jubilee Medal	
	Police Long Service and Good Conduct Medal	

Brunstrom was awarded the Queen's Police Medal (QPM) in the 2006 Birthday Honours. He retired in 2009.
