= Snowdonia Marathon =

Mountain marathon in North Wales

- Logo of the Snowdonia Marathon
- Date: October
- Location: Snowdonia National Park, Wales
- Event type: Mountain
- Distance: Marathon
- Established: 1982
- Website: snowdoniamarathon.co.uk

The Snowdonia Marathon, known as Marathon Eryri from 2023, is a marathon in Snowdonia (Eryri), North Wales. It was established in 1982 as an alternative to city and town races. The route makes a circumnavigation of the Snowdon massif, starting and finishing at Llanberis. It is held annually in October.

In a 2007 poll by Runner's World Magazine, the Snowdonia Marathon was voted the best marathon in the UK.

The marathon announced in June 2023 that it would be known as Marathon Eryri in future, citing the removal of the term Snowdonia by the national park authority a few months earlier.

The marathon starts and finishes near the village of Llanberis at the foot of Snowdon. It follows the road through Nant Peris (the former starting point) up towards Pen-y-Gwryd. From there it descends to the shore of Llyn Dinas and continues to the village of Beddgelert. It then loops back on the other side of Snowdon as far as the villages of Rhyd-ddu and Waunfawr before traversing the slopes of the mountain to finish back in Llanberis. Over 2,000 runners were registered for the 2010 race.

== Media coverage ==
A television highlights show is produced and aired by S4C. The BBC reports the news and winners on BBC Radio Wales and BBC Radio Cymru.

== Results ==
=== Men's race ===
Year	Winning time (h:m:s)	First place	Second place	Third place
2025	2:33:56	Michael Kallenberg (WAL)	Ifan Dafydd (WAL)	Nicholas Barry (WAL)
2024	2:28:41	Andrew Davies (WAL)	Michael Kallenberg (WAL)	Michael Young (ENG)
2023	2:31:19	Marshall Smith (ENG)	Daniel Connolly (ENG)	Thomas Charles (ENG)
2022	2:39:51	Daniel Kashi (WAL)	Rhodri Owen (WAL)	Michael Taylor (ENG)
2021	No race			
2020	No race			
2019	2:34:14	Callum Rowlinson (ENG)	Daniel Connolly (ENG)	Martin Green (WAL)
2018	2:38:21	Russell Bentley (ENG)	Martin Green (WAL)	Robert Weekes (WAL)
2017	2:36:54	Daniel Jones (ENG)	Matt Hobbs Otter (ENG)	Paul Jones (ENG)
2016	2:35:05	Russell Bentley (ENG)	Daniel Jones (ENG)	Rob Bridges (ENG)
2015	2:33:39	John Gilbert (ENG)	Michael Kallenburg (WAL)	Phillip Matthews (WAL)
2014	2:40:10	Alun Vaughan (WAL)	Steve Rees (WAL)	Harvey Wharton (WAL)
2013	2:43:50	Rob Samuel (WAL)	Robert Bridges (ENG)	Rob Atkin (WAL)
2012	2:35:42	Rob Samuel (WAL)	Matthew Roberts (WAL)	Justin Maxwell (IRE)
2011	2:36:45	Rob Samuel (WAL)	Murray Strain (SCO)	Richard Gardiner (WAL)
2010	2:36:24	Richard Gardiner (WAL)	Matt Janes (WAL)	Michael Aldridge (ENG)
2009	2:46:59	Julian Macdonald (ENG)	Gwyn Owen (WAL)	Paul Lewis (ENG)
2008	2:44:40	Martin Cox (ENG)	Rob Samuel (WAL)	Philip Hails (ENG)
2007	2:41:28	Shaun Milford (ENG)	John Allen (ENG)	Dennis Walmsley (ENG)
2006	2:39:55	Dennis Walmsley (ENG)	John Allen (ENG)	Philip Hails (ENG)
2005	2:46:50	Dennis Walmsley (ENG)	Richard Pattinson (ENG)	John Allen (ENG)
2004	2:41:54	Dennis Walmsley (ENG)	Simon Link (ENG)	James McQueen (WAL)
2003	2:38:44	Martin Cox (ENG)	Phil Nichol (ENG)	Dylan Jones (WAL)
2002	No race			
2001	2:37:14	Dennis Walmsley (ENG)		
2000	2:48:12	Philip Nichol (ENG)		
1999	2:40:09	Dennis Walmsley (ENG)		
1998	2:43:16	Mark Roberts (WAL)		
1997	2:41:31	John Allen (ENG)		
1996	2:40:53	Stuart Mills (ENG)		
1995	2:35:25	John Parker (ENG)		
1994	2:32:54	John Wieczorek (POL)		
1993	2:35:35	Shane Snow (WAL)		
1992	2:36:41	John Parker (ENG)		
1991	2:31:41	Emlyn Roberts (WAL)		
1990	2:37:30	Dewi Jones (WAL)		
1989	2:34:52	Kevin Gaskell (ENG)		
1988	2:33:57	Kevin Gaskell (ENG)		
1987	2:33:08	Jeffrey Norman (ENG)		
1986	2:33:31	Jeffrey Norman (ENG)		
1985	2:28:02	Jeffrey Norman (ENG)		
1984	2:29:08	Michael Neary (ENG)		
1983	2:29:38	Jeffrey Norman (ENG)		
1982	2:34:09	Jeffrey Norman (ENG)		

=== Women's race ===
Year	Winning time (h:m:s)	First place	Second place	Third place
2025	2:58:47	Ceri Merwood (ENG)	Emily Jones (WAL)	Tinka Vinks (NED)
2024	2:59:23	Louise Flynn (WAL)	Elinor Kirk (WAL)	Antoinette Rose (WAL)
2023	2:58:03	Alaw Evans (WAL)	Gillian Allen (ENG)	Caryl Edwards (WAL)
2022	3:13:43	Caroline Brock (ENG)	Clare Patterson (WAL)	Llinos Jones (WAL)
2021	No race			
2020	No race			
2019	3:09:18	Andrea Rowlands (WAL)	Anna Bracegirdle (WAL)	Danielle Higham
2018	3:05:33	Anna Bracegirdle (WAL)	Emma Wookey (WAL)	Andrea Rowlands (WAL)
2017	2:57:25	Hayley Munn (ENG)	Andrea Rowlands (WAL)	Sarah Cumber (ENG)
2016	3:03:59	Joanne Nelson (ENG)	Andrea Rowlands (WAL)	Tracy Mccartney (ENG)
2015	3:08:47	Tracy Mccartney (ENG)	Joanne Nelson (ENG)	Andrea Rowlands (WAL)
2014	3:08:53	Andrea Rowlands (WAL)	Lucy Walmsley (WAL)	Angharad Mair (WAL)
2013	3:12:07	Sarah Caskey (ENG)	Melanie Staley (WAL)	Andrea Rowlands (WAL)
2012	3:06:26	Emily Gelder (ENG)	Clare Phillips (WAL)	Sally Wilder (WAL)
2011	3:11:32	Kelly Morgan (WAL)	Olivia Walwyn (ENG)	Gina Paletta (WAL)
2010	3:05:15	Christine Howard (ENG)	Andrea Rowlands (WAL)	Shan Roberts (WAL)
2009	3:17:03	Shan Roberts (WAL)	Andrea Rowlands (WAL)	Robyn Oldham (ENG)
2008	3:14:55	Alison Sedman (ENG)	Ruth Johnstone (ENG)	Nicky Tyrrell (ENG)
2007	3:13:21	Debbie Walters (ENG)	Jenny Moore (ENG)	Alison Sedman (ENG)
2006	3:05:53	Adela Salt (ENG)	Zoe Procter	Louise Blizzard
2005	3:20:49	Liz Hawker (ENG)	Yvonne Wyke	Maggie Hughes
2004	3:11:59	Alison Sedman (ENG)	Adela Salt (ENG)	Amy Karen McKechnie
2003	3:11:02	Alison Sedman (ENG)	Kathryn Drake (ENG)	Liz Hawker (ENG)
2002	No race			
2001	3:12:13	Kathryn Drake (ENG)		
2000	3:06:52	Sally Newman (ENG)		
1999	3:07:39	Sally Newman (ENG)		
1998	3:07:26	Kathryn Drake (ENG)		
1997	3:11:19	Zoe Lowe (ENG)		
1996	2:59:42	Carolyn Hunter-Rowe (ENG)		
1995	3:06:52	Kathryn Drake (ENG)		
1994	3:12:55	Kathryn Drake (ENG)		
1993	2:57:59	Kathryn Drake (ENG)		
1992	3:01:32	Kathryn Drake (ENG)		
1991	3:02:30	Zoe Lowe (ENG)		
1990	3:04:56	Zoe Lowe (ENG)		
1989	3:01:21	Kathryn Drake (ENG)		
1988	2:56:43	June Cowper (ENG)		
1987	3:11:25	P Mee (ENG)		
1986	3:17:40	Rose Gillick (ENG)		
1985	3:21:11	Jean Robertson (WAL)		
1984	3:28:19	Bridget Hogge (WAL)		
1983	3:33:25	Jean Robertson (WAL)		
1982	3:42:04	Jean Robertson (WAL)		

== Half-marathon ==
Since 2012 there has also been an annual Snowdonia Half Marathon, held in April, and mostly run on roads between Llanrwst, Trefriw and Betws-y-coed.
