= Jerry Hunter =

American academic and novelist (born 1965)

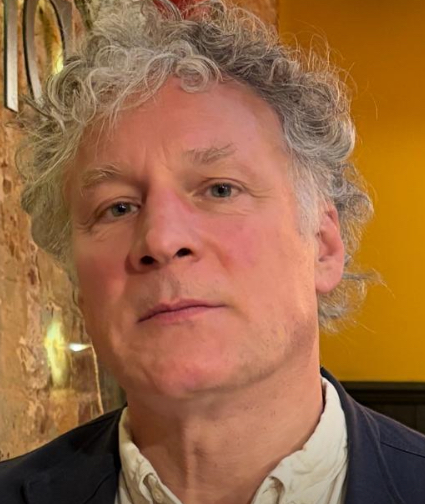
- Hunter in 2025
- Born: Thomas Gerald Hunter; Cincinnati, Ohio
- Occupations: Academic, novelist
- Years active: 2000-present
- Children: Megan Angharad Hunter

Thomas Gerald Hunter FLSW (born 1965), more commonly known as Jerry Hunter, is an American academic and novelist who has spent most of his professional life in Wales. His academic field is Welsh-language literature and he writes in the Welsh language as well as in English; as a fiction writer, he has been described as one of the major Welsh language novelists of the 21st century.

== Biography ==
Born in Cincinnati, Hunter is a graduate of the University of Cincinnati (BA). Developing an interest in Welsh literature during his undergraduate degree, Hunter first came to Wales as an MPhil student at Aberystwyth University and immediately began learning Welsh. He returned to the United States to obtain a PhD at Harvard University; but since the 1990s he has lived in Wales and held academic posts at Cardiff and, since 2003, at Bangor University, where he is currently (2026) a professor in the School of Welsh. He has also served as the University's Pro Vice Chancellor for Welsh Medium students and Civic Engagement. He is a former editor of the Academi's literary periodical Taliesin.

Since 2023, Hunter has been co-host of a Welsh-language podcast, Yr Heniaith ('The Old Language'). In each chapter, Hunter provides a layperson's summary of key text, figure or event in the history of Welsh-language literature to his co-host Richard Wyn Jones, a friend since they met in Aberystwyth in the 1990s and self-described as being largely ignorant about the subject. A video version of each Podcast is shared to YouTube and a written summary in English on Nation.Cymru; as of January 2026 seventy-nine episodes had been released and the chronological survey which began with the sixth-century Y Gododdin had reached the 18th century antiquarian Iolo Morganwg. Hunter's co-host Richard Wyn Jones regularly draws attention to the irony of an American teaching a man from Ynys Môn about the literary tradition of his own language; though Hunter has also described himself on the podcast as being as much Welsh as American.

=== Personal life ===
Hunter is married to the actress Judith Humphreys and they have two daughters, Luned and Megan Angharad, the latter of whom is also a novelist. He lives in Dyffryn Nantlle. He describes himself as a keen musician, and has previously been a member of various amateur rock bands.

Hunter is an outspoken critic of the presidency of Donald Trump and described being an American in Wales when Trump was elected in 2016 as the event in his life which brought him the greatest sense of shame. Hunter was a founding member of the pressure group Cymuned in 2001, which called for the protection of Welsh-speaking communities.

== Career ==
=== Academic Work ===
Hunter's academic interests and publications cover the whole history of Welsh-language literature from the middle ages to contemporary literautre. However, he is particularly known for his research exploring the writing of Welsh Americans and of the Welsh in America, in English but particularly in Welsh. His first monograph, Soffestri’r Saeson (University of Wales Press, 2000), a study of the use of prophecy as political propaganda in the Tudor age, was shortlisted for the Wales Book of the Year award in 2001. Llwch Cenhedloedd, ('The Dust of Generations', Gwasg Carreg Gwalch, 2003), a history of the American Civil War based on Welsh-language evidence (mainly letters and other material written and published in Welsh on both sides of the Atlantic), won the Wales Book of the Year award in 2004. His has also published a book on the prominent Welsh American anti-slavery campaigner, Robert Everett: I Ddeffro Ysbryd y Wlad ('To Awaken the Nation's Spirit', Gwasg Carreg Gwalch, 2007), again drawing on a wealth of Welsh-language evidence mainly unused by historians. His interest in the Welsh-language history of his native United States has also led to the publication of an English-language volume Welsh Writing from the American Civil War: Sons of Arthur, Children of Lincoln (University of Wales Press, 2007). 2012's Llwybrau Cenhedloedd ('Nations' Pahths') describes the work of Welsh missionaries amongst the Cherokee, whilst 2024's Dros Gyfiawnder a Rhyddid ('For Justice and Freedom') explores the written history of Welsh-speaking soldiers in the American Civil War, particularly the Welsh American Union regiment known as the Cambrian Guards, most of whom were Welsh-speaking.

In 2013, Hunter was elected a Fellow of the Learned Society of Wales. Hunter is a member of Gorsedd Cymru, with the bardic name 'Gerallt Glan Ohio'.

=== Fiction ===
As a novelist, Hunter is best known as a writer of historical fiction for adults, and many of his novels, like his academic work, explores the history of the Welsh in America, though he has also explored genres such as dystopian fiction, and with his very first fiction book, Ceffylau'r Cymylau (Gwasg Gomer, 2010) which was written for his daughters, fantasy and children's fiction.

His first novel for adults, Gwenddydd (Gwasg Gwynedd, 2010), is ostensibly a novel about a brother and sister during the Second World War, however it is in fact a retelling in modern clothes of the medieval legend of Myrddin (Merlin) and his sister Gwenddydd, as recounted in the thirteenth-century poem 'Cyfoesi Myrddin a Gwenddydd ei Chwaer'; the novel won for him the Prose Medal that year at the National Eisteddfod of Wales. The Prose Medal is one of the major literary awards at the Eisteddfod, and though it had previously been won by individuals who had learned Welsh as adults, Hunter was the first winner to be originally from outside the United Kingdom. Gwenddydd has been described as "an important contribution to War fiction in Wales."

Gwenddydd was followed by a second comparatively short historical novel, Gwreiddyn Chwerw ('Bitter Root', 2012), set this time in the nineteenth century. Hunter's third novel however, Ebargofiant ('Oblivion', 2014), was both an ambitious step forward and something of a stylistic departure, being a post-apocalyptic portrayal of a world ravaged by global environmental collapse. Written in an original, non-standard Welsh orthography, it has been compared to Finnegans Wake and Samuel Beckett and variously described as "original", "experimental" and "revolutionary". Ebargofiant is regularly featured on lists of the greatest Welsh language novels of the 2010s.

Hunter returned to historical fiction for his fourth novel, Y Fro Dywyll ('Dark Territory'), published in the same year as Ebargofiant and depicting a 16th century adventurer searching for a Welsh colony in North America. Its reviews variously described Hunter as a "boundary tester par excellence" and "a master at work", and it was placed on the Wales Book of the Year Shortlist for 2015. Y Fro Dywyll is, as of 2026, the only one of Hunter's novels to be translated into English, by Patrick Ford as Dark Territory. A Bulgarian translation also exists, by Daniel Aleksandrov Todorov.

With his next novel Hunter returned once again to the history of the Welsh in America. Ynys Fadog (2018) ('Madog's Island'), which follows a family of Welsh settlers to the United States over multiple generations, has been claimed to be the longest novel ever written in Welsh and been described as a "Welsh War and Peace". It netted Hunter another book of the year nomination, his fourth overall (as of 2025).

Hunter's first novel of the 2020s, 2021's Safana, was both a continuation and departure from his previous work. Once again returning to American history in the person of George Whitefield, the novel also incorporates elements of fantasy alternate history.

He is the author of a play, Ledi'r Wyrcws ('The Lady from the Workhouse'), which was premiered in 2026. Though a work of fiction, the play draws on the real-life experience of Amy Parry-Williams collecting Welsh folk songs in a workhouse.

The same year, 2026, saw the publication of his first novel in English, An Atheist Christian Gunslinger. A dystopian novel bearing some similarity with Ebargofiant, with both novels drawing inspiration from Russell Hoban's Riddley Walker, the book once again features a non-conventional orthography, in this case based on a combination of midwestern and southern American dialects; and has been described as representing the author's creative response to the rise of the MAGA movement in the United States.

== Bibliography ==
=== Academic/Historical Books ===
Note: This bibliography lists only full books of which Hunter is the sole or main author, not individual chapters, journal articles or other academic publications. More comprehensive lists of Hunter's academic publications are available elsewhere.

- Soffestri’r Saeson: Hanesyddiaeth a Hunaniaeth yng Nghyfnod y Tuduriaid (2000), University of Wales Press (in Welsh).
- "I ddeffro ysbryd y wlad": Robert Everett a'r Ymgyrch yn erbyn Caethwasiaeth Americanaidd. (2007), Gwasg Carreg Gwalch (in Welsh).
- Sons of Arthur, Children of Lincoln: Welsh Writing from the American Civil War (2007), University of Wales Press (in English).
- Llwybrau Cenhedloedd: Cyd-Destunoli'r Genhadaeth Gymreig i'r Tsalagi (2012), University of Wales Press (in Welsh).
- Dros Gyfiawnder a Rhyddid: Y Cambrian Guards, Caethwasiaeth a Rhyfel Cartref America (2024), Y Lolfa (in Welsh).

=== Novels ===
Where an English and Welsh title are given for a Welsh book, this indicates that a separate English translation has also been published; both publication dates are given.

==== In Welsh ====
- Ceffylau'r Cymylau (2010), Gomer / The Cloud Horses (2011), Gomer (for Children)
- Gwenddydd (2010), Gwasg Gwynedd
- Gwreiddyn Chwerw (2012), Gwasg Gwynedd
- Ebargofiant (2014), Y Lolfa
- Y Fro Dywyll (2014), Y Lolfa / Dark Territory, (2017), Y Lolfa (translation by Patrick Ford; a Bulgarian translation also exists)
- Ynys Fadog (2018), Y Lolfa
- Safana (2021), Y Lolfa
- Y Rhawnbais (2026), Melin Bapur

==== In English ====
- An Atheist Christian Gunslinger (2026), Melin Bapur
