= Angharad Mair =

Welsh television presenter and producer

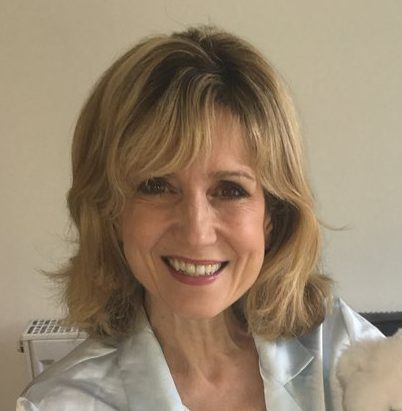
Angharad Mair (2017)

Angharad Mair (born March 1960) is a Welsh television presenter; she is the lead presenter on the nightly S4C Welsh language magazine programme, Heno and the BBC Wales news programme, Wales Today.

== Background ==
She was born in Carmarthen, South Wales, where she lived with her older sister and three younger brothers. Her first jobs were working in Tesco and the Ivy Bush Royal Hotel in Carmarthen.

== Media career ==
After training and working for BBC Wales, where she worked on the Welsh language children's programme Bilidowcar, Mair joined Llanelli-based independent television production company Tinopolis in 1991. When Tinopolis produced both programmes from Cardiff, for a time she presented both the English language BBC Wales news Wales Today from 18:30 to 19:00, as well as the Welsh S4C Wedi 7 from 19:00 to 19:30. In 2008 Mair still presented Wedi7, and was Executive Director for Tinopolis, where by 2006 she held 2.482% of the shares.

Mair wrote a column in the Wales on Sunday newspaper. In December 2006 her comment on the break-up of the relationship of her friend, ITV1 weather presenter Sian Lloyd, against Lloyd's former partner Lembit Öpik - including suggesting that Montgomeryshire needed a new MP - drew much public criticism.

== Running career ==
After a challenge from a colleague, Mair ran her first full marathon in the New York City Marathon in 1991, in a time of 3:29:00. This result for a beginner encouraged her to keep training and she won the Reykjavik Marathon in 1996. She entered the trials for the Great Britain athletics squad for the 1997 World Championships in Athens, Greece, where she came 23rd in the Women's Marathon in a time of 2:42:31.

Mair kept running and in 2014 finished 3rd in the Snowdonia Marathon.

In 2016 Mair set a new British record for the marathon, in the W55 Category, by completing the London Marathon in a time of 2.57.46.

== Personal life ==
Mair has two daughters with her second husband Jonathan Cray, a cameraman for Tinopolis. The family live in Peterston-super-Ely in the Vale of Glamorgan.

Mair has argued for Welsh independence.

== Competition Record ==
Year	Competition	Venue	Position	Event	Notes
Representing United Kingdom
1997	World Championships	Athens, Greece	23rd	Marathon	2:42:31
Other races
1991	New York Marathon	New York City		Marathon	3:29:23
1992	Berlin Marathon	Berlin	35th	Marathon	2:59:03
1995	Berlin Marathon	Berlin	19th	Marathon	2:46:00
1996	Reykjavik Marathon	Reykjavic	1st	Marathon	2:38:47 (PB)
2014	London Marathon	London	175	Marathon	3:10:46
2014	Snowdonia Marathon	Llanberis	3rd	Marathon	3:18:23
2015	London Marathon	London	68th	Marathon	2:58:57
2016	London Marathon	London	58th (1st F55)	Marathon	2:57:53
